= 2007 in England =

- Centuries: 19th; 20th; 21st
- Decades: 1980s; 1990s; 2000s; 2010s; 2020s
- See also: 2006–07 in English football 2007–08 in English football 2007 in the United Kingdom; Other events of 2007

Events from 2007 in England

== Incumbent ==
- Monarch - Elizabeth II
- Prime Minister - Tony Blair (until 27 June), Gordon Brown (from 27 June)

== Events ==
=== January ===
- 1 January – The second of two days of strike action hits Central Trains, affecting many parts of England, especially the East and West Midlands.
- 3 January – National Express coach accident: A National Express coach from Heathrow Airport to Aberdeen, Scotland crashes on a slip road between the M4 and the M25, killing two people and injuring thirty-six others.
- 4 January – In response to yesterday's crash, National Express withdraw all 12 of their Neoplan Skyliner double-decker coaches as a precaution.
- 5 January
  - The England cricket team loses the fifth Ashes test in Sydney, Australia by 10 wickets, resulting in a 5–0 series whitewash, the first time this has occurred since the 1920–1921 Ashes Tour.
  - Umran Javed, a British Muslim, is found guilty at the Old Bailey, London, of inciting racial hatred at a London rally in February 2006 protesting against the publication of a cartoon in a Danish newspaper depicting Muhammad (see Jyllands-Posten Muhammad cartoons controversy).
- 7 January – Bristol Airport closes its runway due to concerns by various airlines (including easyJet and BA Connect) over the safety of landing in wet weather. This follows two days of nine airlines refusing to use the runway.
- 10 January – Two military helicopters collide in mid-air near Market Drayton, Shropshire, killing one person and injuring three others.
- 10 January–28 January – John Reid faces mounting problems continuing from those of his predecessors including further prisoner escapes especially from open prisons and also absconding of those under Control Orders and missing sex offenders.
- 16 January – At the 64th Golden Globe Awards, Helen Mirren wins an award for her portrayal of Elizabeth II in The Queen and Sacha Baron Cohen for his role in Borat: Cultural Learnings of America for Make Benefit Glorious Nation of Kazakhstan. Other British winners were Hugh Laurie in House and Jeremy Irons in Elizabeth I.
- 20 January – The MSC Napoli is deliberately grounded to prevent it sinking, leading to concern about environmental damage to Branscombe beach in Devon.

=== February ===
- 3 February – The presence of the H5N1 virus in the avian flu outbreak at the Holton turkey plant in Suffolk is confirmed.
- 11 February – The England cricket team defeat Australia to win their first overseas One-Day International trophy since 1997.
- 23 February – Grayrigg rail crash: A Virgin Trains Pendolino train derails in Cumbria, killing one person and injuring dozens more.

=== March ===
- 2 March – The Attorney General for England and Wales, Lord Goldsmith, obtains an injunction from the High Court preventing the BBC from broadcasting an item about investigations into the alleged cash for honours political scandal.
- 3 March – Contaminated petrol that was causing cars to fail is traced to a fuel depot in Essex.
- 5 March
  - Al-Qaeda has threatened to kidnap or kill Prince Harry during his upcoming tour of duty in Iraq.
- 13 March – Medway Police Station opens in Gillingham, Kent, England, replacing older stations, such as Chatham Police Station.
- 15 March – Sally Clark, the woman who spent four years in prison before being released in 2003 when the High Court cleared her of killing her two baby sons (victims of cot death), dies at the age of 42.
- 16 March – Coroner Andrew Walker finds that the death of soldier Matty Hull in the 190th Fighter Squadron, Blues and Royals "friendly fire" incident was "unlawful and criminal". The U.S. Department of State rejects this ruling.
- 17 March – The rebuilt Wembley Stadium opens to the public for the first time, more than six years after its predecessor was closed.
- 30 March – Network Rail (the replacement for Railtrack) is fined £4 million for health and safety breaches leading to the Ladbroke Grove rail crash, in which 31 people died.

=== April ===
- 4 April – Violence erupts during a UEFA Champions League game between Manchester United and AS Roma.
- 19 April – Foster mother Eunice Spry from Tewkesbury jailed for 14 years, having been convicted of 26 charges of child abuse spanning 19 years.
- 24 April – Anti-terrorism police arrest five people in London and one in Luton for alleged breaches of the Terrorism Act.
- 28 April – An earthquake measuring 4.3 on the richter scale strikes in Kent, injuring one and causing damage to buildings.

=== May ===
- May – The all-new Ford Mondeo goes on sale in Britain with a range of saloons, hatchbacks and estates.
- 3 May
  - Parts of the country have elections for local councils.
  - Madeleine McCann, a three-year-old Leicestershire girl, is reported missing in Algarve, Portugal.
- 6 May – Manchester United win their ninth Premier League title.
- 18 May – Prince William officially opens the new Wembley Stadium.
- 19 May – Chelsea FC win the FA Cup with Didier Drogba's goal giving them a 1–0 win over Manchester United FC in the first club game to be played at the rebuilt Wembley Stadium.
- 21 May – A fire damages the Cutty Sark in Greenwich.
- 24 May – Jenny Bailey becomes the first transsexual mayor in the United Kingdom.
- 29 May – The Longbridge car factory in Birmingham re-opens, two years after the bankruptcy of MG Rover. The re-opened factory is a scaled down operation which will initially just produce the MG TF sports car, though there are plans by Chinese owners Nanjing Automobile to build other cars there in the future.
- 30 May – A fire at a Magnox nuclear power station in Oldbury, South Gloucestershire, forces its indefinite closure. British Nuclear Group announces that the fire has not damaged the reactor and was in a "non-nuclear" area.

=== June ===
- 13 June –
  - Rekha Kumari-Baker murders her two daughters in their sleep, stabbing them a total of 69 times. She is later sentenced to life imprisonment, with a minimum tariff of 33 years.
  - The Queen awards Sir Tim Berners-Lee the Order of Merit for his pioneering work on the World Wide Web. Salman Rushdie receives a knighthood, sparking protests in Iran and Pakistan.
- 20 June – Scarborough F.C., members of the Football League from 1987 to 1999, go out of business with debts of £2.5million.
- 25 June –
  - – Heavy flooding devastates the cities of Sheffield and Hull, causing at least three deaths.
    - – Scarborough Athletic F.C. is formed to replace the old Scarborough club.
- 29 June – Two car bombs are uncovered in central London but are defused before they can explode.

=== July ===
- 1 July
  - A smoking ban comes into effect in all enclosed public places in England.
  - Concert for Diana held in memory of Diana, Princess of Wales.
- 2 July
  - Michael Mullen, 21, of Leeds, is sentenced to life imprisonment for the rape and murder of his two-year-old niece Casey Leigh Mullen, who died at her home in the city on 11 February this year. The trial judge recommends that Mullen should serve a minimum of 35 years before being considered for parole.
  - Demolition work begins on the historic HP Sauce factory in Birmingham, which closed in May with the loss of 125 jobs and the end of more than 100 years of manufacturing when the production facility was transferred to the Netherlands.
- 6–8 July – The British Grand Prix is held at the Silverstone Circuit, won by Ferrari's Kimi Räikkönen with home hero Lewis Hamilton finishing third behind McLaren team-mate Fernando Alonso.
- 22 July – Floods cause chaos through wide areas of Britain, especially the counties of Gloucestershire, Warwickshire, Worcestershire and Oxfordshire, leaving hundreds homeless and thousands of vehicles stranded on major roads.

=== August ===
- 2 August – First reports of outbreak of foot-and-mouth.
- 12 August - Gary Newlove dies of his injuries after being attacked by a group of teenage boys in Warrington, Cheshire on 10 August.
- 18 August - Three people die in the Penhallow Hotel fire in Newquay, Cornwall.
- 22 August – 11-year-old Rhys Jones is shot dead in Croxteth, Liverpool. His death is believed to have been a random shooting carried out by a local gang.
- 24 August – Sophie Lancaster dies of her injuries after her and her boyfriend were attacked by a group of teenage boys in Bacup, Lancashire on 11 August.

=== September ===
- 1 September – Eurovision Dance Contest held in London.
- 6 September – Murder victim Rhys Jones is buried following a funeral service at Liverpool Anglican Cathedral.
- 10 September – Television entertainer Michael Barrymore is told that he will not face charges in connection with the death of Stuart Lubbock, the man who was found dead in a swimming pool at his house more than six years ago.

=== October ===
- 20 October – South Africa defeats England at the Rugby World Cup final in Stade de France, Saint-Denis.

=== November ===
- 1 November – London's Metropolitan Police Service is found guilty of endangering the public following the fatal shooting of Jean Charles de Menezes, an innocent Brazilian who officers mistook for a suicide bomber.
- 2 November – Four firefighters feared dead in the Atherstone fire disaster.
- 4 November – Nigel Hastilow, a Tory candidate due to stand in Halesowen and Rowley Regis at the next general election, resigns after coming under heavy criticism for comments in the Express and Star newspaper in which he claimed that Enoch Powell had been "right" about his fears over immigration.
- 7 November – An inquest in Essex hears that Sally Clark died of "acute alcohol intoxication".
- 8–9 November – North Sea flood.
- 14 November
  - High Speed 1 from London to the Channel Tunnel is opened to passengers.
  - Full rollout of UK digital terrestrial television switchover begins with complete turning off of the analogue signal to the Whitehaven area.
- 26 November – Donorgate: Labour Party official Peter Watt resigns over loans received by the party from David Abrahams.

== Births ==
- 2 January – Eric Pathansali, Malaysian footballer
- 15 October – Raja Daniel Petra, Malaysian footballer

== See also ==
- 2007 in Northern Ireland
- 2007 in Scotland
- 2007 in Wales
