= 2007 in Scotland =

- Centuries: 19th; 20th; 21st
- Decades: 1980s; 1990s; 2000s; 2010s; 2020s
- See also: List of years in Scotland; Timeline of Scottish history 2007 in: The UK • England • Wales • Elsewhere; Scottish football: 2006–07 • 2007–08; 2007 in Scottish television

Events from the year 2007 in Scotland.

== Incumbents ==
- First Minister and Keeper of the Great Seal – Jack McConnell until 16 May; Alex Salmond (from 17 May)
- Secretary of State for Scotland – Douglas Alexander until 28 June; Des Browne

=== Law officers ===
- Lord Advocate – Elish Angiolini
- Solicitor General for Scotland – John Beckett until 24 May; Frank Mulholland
- Advocate General for Scotland – Lord Davidson of Glen Clova

=== Judiciary ===
- Lord President of the Court of Session and Lord Justice General – Lord Hamilton
- Lord Justice Clerk – Lord Gill
- Chairman of the Scottish Land Court – Lord McGhie

== Events ==
- 17 January – Queen Margaret University College at Musselburgh is granted full University status as Queen Margaret University, becoming Edinburgh's fourth university.
- February – Scottish Voice (provisionally named Scottish Democrats) is launched as a centre-right political party by Archie Stirling.
- 23 February – Grayrigg derailment: a high speed Pendolino train on the West Coast Main Line from London to Glasgow derails on faulty pointwork in the Lake District of England, killing one person.
- 28 February – the Cathedral Church of Saint Margaret in Ayr replaces the Good Shepherd Cathedral as the Mother Church for the Roman Catholic Diocese of Galloway and seat of the Catholic Bishop of Galloway (formal dedication 14 September).
- 7–9 March – Network Rail signalworkers strike, causing rail services in Scotland to be severely curtailed.
- 3 May
  - Scottish Parliament election. The SNP win a plurality of seats and go on to form the Scottish Executive.
  - Scottish local council elections.
- 16 May – the UEFA Cup Final is held at Hampden Park, Glasgow. Sevilla FC defeat RCD Espanyol on penalty kicks.
  - Alex Salmond is elected First Minister of Scotland, becoming the first nationalist to hold the role.
- 17 May – Alex Salmond is officially sworn-in as First Minister of Scotland at the Court of Session, Edinburgh in front of 15 of Scotland's most senior judges.
- 27 June – Giffnock-born Gordon Brown succeeds Edinburgh-born Tony Blair as Prime Minister of the United Kingdom.
- 30 June – attempted terrorist attack on Glasgow Airport.
- 1 August – the University of Paisley and Bell College merge to create the University of the West of Scotland.
- 20 August – Loch Lomond Seaplanes begin a scheduled service from Glasgow Seaplane Terminal to Oban.
- 15 September – rally driver Colin McRae and three other people are killed when their helicopter crashes near Lanark.
- 1 October – sitcom Fags, Mags and Bags, written by and starring Sanjeev Kohli and Donald McLeary, is first broadcast on BBC Radio 4.
- 15 November – Scotland's First Minister Alex Salmond wins The Herald's Scottish Politician of the Year award and is also named Parliamentarian of the Year in The Spectator magazine awards.
- 30 November – St. Andrew's Day is for the first time a designated bank holiday in Scotland, under the St Andrew's Day Bank Holiday (Scotland) Act 2007 (Royal Assent: 15 January).
- 29 December – Phil O'Donnell, the 35-year-old Motherwell footballer, dies from a heart attack in a Scottish Premier League fixture. O'Donnell was capped for Scotland once in 1993, and had been part of the Celtic side that won the Scottish league title in 1997–98 season.
- Poet Alastair Reid reads his poem "Scotland" publicly for the last time at a literary festival in St Andrews, then burns the manuscript.
- Neil Forsyth introduces his fictional comic Broughty Ferry cheeseburger tycoon Bob Servant in his book Delete This At your Peril.
- BrewDog is founded as a brewery in Fraserburgh by James Watt and Martin Dickie.

== Deaths ==
- 7 January – Magnus Magnusson, television presenter and writer (born 1929 in Iceland)
- c. 10 January – Harry Horse, cartoonist and vocalist in Swamptrash (born 1960 in England)
- 9 February – Ian Richardson, actor (born 1934)
- 26 August – Hamish Barber, medical academic (born 1933)
- 11 September – Ian Porterfield, footballer (born 1946)
- 15 September – Colin McRae, rally driver (born 1968)
- 16 October – Deborah Kerr, actress (born 1921)
- 8 November – Duncan Williamson, storyteller and singer (born 1928)
- 29 December – Phil O'Donnell, footballer (born 1972)
- Steven Campbell, figurative painter (born 1953)

== See also ==
- 2007 in England
- 2007 in Northern Ireland
- 2007 in Wales
