= 2008 in Scotland =

- Centuries: 19th; 20th; 21st
- Decades: 1980s; 1990s; 2000s; 2010s; 2020s
- See also: List of years in Scotland; Timeline of Scottish history 2008 in: The UK • England • Wales • Elsewhere; Scottish football: 2007–08 • 2008–09; 2008 in Scottish television

Events from the year 2008 in Scotland.

== Incumbents ==
- First Minister and Keeper of the Great Seal – Alex Salmond
- Secretary of State for Scotland – Des Browne until 3 October; then Jim Murphy

=== Law officers ===
- Lord Advocate – Elish Angiolini
- Solicitor General for Scotland – Frank Mulholland
- Advocate General for Scotland – Lord Davidson of Glen Clova

=== Judiciary ===
- Lord President of the Court of Session and Lord Justice General – Lord Hamilton
- Lord Justice Clerk – Lord Gill
- Chairman of the Scottish Land Court – Lord McGhie

== Events ==
=== January ===
- January – first phase of Whitelee Wind Farm, which will be the largest wind farm in Europe, begins feeding electricity to the grid.

=== February ===
- 1 February – Eigg Electrical begins generation of the island's entire electricity supply from renewable energy sources.

=== April ===
- 6 April – the Corporate Manslaughter and Corporate Homicide Act 2007 comes into force.

=== May ===
- 19 May – First ScotRail reopens the railway line from Stirling to Alloa for passengers.

=== June ===
- 4 June – Gretna F.C., just relegated from the Scottish Premier League, go out of business with debts of £4,000,000.

=== July ===
- 7 July – The Antonine Wall, part of the ancient Roman limes, is designated as a World Heritage Site.
- 25 July – Old Monach lighthouse on Shillay, Monach Islands, re-lit.

=== November ===
- 6 November – Lindsay Roy retains the seat for the Labour Party at the Glenrothes by-election with a majority of 6,737 votes. The previous Labour MP John MacDougall died on 13 August 2008 from pleural mesothelioma.
- 14 November – Sixteen-year-old Nicolle Earley kills 63-year-old Ann Gray at her home in Crosshill, Fife.
- 19 November – Clackmannanshire Bridge over the Firth of Forth at Kincardine is opened to traffic.
- 20 November – Health Secretary Nicola Sturgeon is named Scottish Politician of the Year.

=== December ===
- 18 December – Woolworths announce their 807 UK stores will close by 5 January 2009.
- 27 December – first seventeen of Woolworths branches in Scotland close, with the rest to follow shortly.

== Deaths ==
- 27 July – Bob Crampsey, historian, author and broadcaster (born 1930)
- 8 October – John Bannerman, historian of Gaelic Scotland (born 1932)
- 5 November – Ian Anderson, footballer (born 1954)
- 18 December – Hannah Frank, visual artist (born 1908)

== The arts ==
- Alternative hip hop group Young Fathers forms in Edinburgh.
- Peter Maxwell Davies composes his String Trio.
- Supermarionation band is formed in Edinburgh.

== See also ==
- Timeline of Scottish history
- 2008 in England
- 2008 in Northern Ireland
- 2008 in the United Kingdom
- 2008 in Wales
