= 2008 in England =

- Centuries: 19th; 20th; 21st
- Decades: 1980s; 1990s; 2000s; 2010s; 2020s
- See also: 2007–08 in English football 2008–09 in English football 2008 in the United Kingdom; Other events of 2008

Events from 2008 in England

== Incumbent ==
- Monarch - Elizabeth II
- Prime Minister - Gordon Brown

== Events ==
=== January ===
- 7 January – Queen Elizabeth 2 and MS Queen Victoria leave Southampton for last and first world cruises respectively.
- 12 January – The city of Liverpool officially becomes European Capital of Culture for 2008, a title it will share with Stavanger, Norway.
- 18 January – Last working of Tower Colliery, the last deep mine in the South Wales Valleys (official closure: 25 January).[1]

=== February ===
- 6 February – The England National Football team defeat Switzerland 2–0 in Fabio Capello's first game as manager at Wembley Stadium in London.
- 19 February – Shannon Matthews, 9 years old, from Dewsbury, West Yorkshire, goes missing.
- 21 February – A jury at Ipswich Crown Court finds Steve Wright, 49, guilty of murdering five prostitutes in a spree during late 2006.
- 22 February
  - Steve Wright is sentenced to life imprisonment with a recommendation that he should never be released.
  - Mark Dixie, 37, is found guilty of the September 2005 murder of Surrey model Sally Anne Bowman (18). He is sentenced to life imprisonment at the Old Bailey, where the trial judge recommends that he serves at least 34 years before parole can be considered.
- 26 February – Levi Bellfield, 38, is found guilty of murdering two women in London in sexually motivated attacks; the first in 2001, the second in 2004. He receives a life sentence with a recommendation that he should never be released.
- 27 February – An earthquake with an epicentre in Lincolnshire is felt across most of Britain, with several buildings suffering substantial damage.

=== March ===
- 14 March – Michael Donovan, 39, from Bartley Carr, West Yorkshire, is arrested for the kidnap of the 9-year-old, Shannon Matthews.
- 28 March – Terminal 5 opens at Heathrow Airport for British Airways with many problems with the IT system, coupled with insufficient testing and staff training, which causes over 500 flights to be cancelled.
- 30 March – A plane crashes into a row of houses in Farnborough, London, killing two pilots and three passengers.

=== April ===
- 2 April – A cross human-cow embryo survives a third straight day after being fertilized at Newcastle University. A director for embryonic stem cell laboratories at the Australian Stem Cell Centre says that the "99 per cent human" embryo could improve research within the field of human diseases. The Catholic Church of England and Wales however said that the creation was "monstrous" and says that the later destruction of it is unethical.
- 8 April – Karen Matthews, the mother of the kidnapped 9-year-old girl, Shannon Matthews, is arrested for organizing her daughter's kidnap.

=== May ===
- 1 May
  - The London mayoral election is held. Conservative candidate Boris Johnson defeats the incumbent Labour candidate Ken Livingstone.
  - London Assembly election also takes place, with Brent and Harrow being the only constituency to change hands. Meanwhile, the British National Party gain a seat, their first outside of local councils.
  - Local elections are held in England and Wales. The night sees the governing Labour party fall to third place in the popular vote on 24%, behind the Conservatives on 44% and the Liberal Democrats on 25%.
- 11 May – Manchester United secure their tenth Premier League title in 16 years with a 2–0 win at Wigan Athletic on the final day of the league season. Ryan Giggs, who scores one of United's goals, becomes the first player to win 10 English league titles.
- 15 May – Halifax Town A.F.C., a former Football League side, are expelled from the Conference National with multimillion-pound debts.
- 17 May – The FA Cup Final takes place at Wembley Stadium between Portsmouth and Cardiff City with Portsmouth winning 1–0.
- 20 May – Joey Barton, a player for Newcastle United Football Club, is sentenced to six months in prison after being convicted of assault and affray.
- 21 May – The first all-English European Cup final sees Manchester United beat Chelsea on penalties after a 1–1 draw in Moscow's Luzhniki Stadium.
- 22 May – Construction work begins on the Olympic Stadium being built for the 2012 games.

=== July ===
- 22 July – The London Motor Show is held, a highlight being Vauxhall's launch of its new Insignia that replaces the Vectra and is due on sale later this year.

=== August ===
- 1 August – Barry George acquitted of the murder of Jill Dando.

=== September ===
- 6 September – Morpeth Flood.

=== October ===
- October
  - St Hilda's College, Oxford, ceases to be the last single-sex college of the University of Oxford by admitting male undergraduates.
  - Toyota launches yet another Avensis at the 2008 Paris Motor Show to be built at TMUK.
- 6 October – Footballer Luke McCormick, a former goalkeeper for Plymouth Argyle, is sentenced to seven years in prison for causing death by dangerous driving.
- 26 October – Death of Ian Morton

=== November ===
- 3 November – 575 Harlow–Romford bus route is introduced between Harlow and Romford.
- 5 November – Lewis Hamilton becomes the youngest ever Formula One World Champion.

=== December ===
- 4 December
  - Karen Matthews, 32, is convicted of the kidnapping her 9-year-old daughter, Shanon, who was kidnapped in Dewsbury, West Yorkshire, on 19 February 2008.
  - Lapland New Forest, a Christmas themed park in Dorset closes after scores of complaints about the poor quality of its attractions.
- 16 December – Sean Mercer, 18, is found guilty of murdering 11-year-old Rhys Jones who was shot dead in Croxteth, Liverpool, in August last year. Mercer is sentenced to life imprisonment at the trial judge recommends that he serves at least 22 years before parole can be considered. This is likely to keep Mercer in prison until at least 2030 and the age of 40.
- 18 December – Robert Napper pleads guilty to killing Rachel Nickell, who was stabbed to death on Wimbledon Common on 15 July 1992.

=== Undated ===
- 2008 National Year of Reading is a year-long celebration of reading, in all its forms.

== See also ==
- 2008 in Northern Ireland
- 2008 in Scotland
- 2008 in Wales
