= 2009 in Scotland =

- Centuries: 19th; 20th; 21st
- Decades: 1980s; 1990s; 2000s; 2010s; 2020s
- See also: List of years in Scotland; Timeline of Scottish history 2009 in: The UK • England • Wales • Elsewhere; Scottish football: 2008–09 • 2009–10; 2009 in Scottish television

Events from the year 2009 in Scotland

== Incumbents ==
- First Minister and Keeper of the Great Seal – Alex Salmond
- Secretary of State for Scotland – Jim Murphy

=== Law officers ===
- Lord Advocate – Elish Angiolini
- Solicitor General for Scotland – Frank Mulholland
- Advocate General for Scotland – Lord Davidson of Glen Clova

=== Judiciary ===
- Lord President of the Court of Session and Lord Justice General – Lord Hamilton
- Lord Justice Clerk – Lord Gill
- Chairman of the Scottish Land Court – Lord McGhie

== Events ==
- 25 January (Burns Night)–30 November (St Andrew's Day) – Homecoming Scotland.

=== January ===
- 13 January – minor earthquake in Shetland.
- 24 January – 2009 Buachaille Etive Mòr avalanche: three climbers are killed in an avalanche on Buachaille Etive Mòr in the Highlands. Five others walk away uninjured, whilst another suffers a shoulder injury.
- 28 January – the Scottish Parliament rejects the budget tabled by the Scottish National Party administration. The Presiding Officer casts the deciding vote after the result is originally tied at 64 in favour, 64 against. The Scottish Finance Secretary, John Swinney, says the budget will be put before parliament again as soon as is possible, whilst the First Minister, Alex Salmond, reportedly puts the SNP on an 'election footing' in case the budget were to be voted down once more.

=== February ===
- 4 February – the Scottish Parliament approves the minority SNP's administration's budget at the second time of asking. Both Labour and the Liberal Democrats vote for the budget after voting it down the previous time.

=== March ===
- 30 March – major power cut hits Glasgow and parts of the West of Scotland, causing traffic chaos in most areas.

=== April ===
- 1 April – Marine Scotland is established.
- 3 April – Glasgow school closures protest, 2009 begins.
- 5 April – Andy Murray wins the 2009 Sony Ericsson Open – Men's Singles in tennis.
- 8 April – Slovak Marek Harcar is jailed for at least 25 years after being found guilty of raping and murdering Moira Jones in a Glasgow park.
- 13 April – Scotland win the 2009 World Men's Curling Championship in Moncton, Canada.
- 30 April – Beltane.

=== May ===
- 4 May – John Higgins wins the 2009 World Snooker Championship.
- 14 May – Tradeston Bridge opens for pedestrians across the River Clyde in Glasgow.
- 22 May – Whitelee Wind Farm, the largest wind farm in Europe, officially opens.

=== June ===
- 4 June – the SNP tops the poll in the European Election in Scotland, winning two of Scotland's six MEPs. Labour also win two, with the Conservatives and Liberal Democrats winning one each.
- 14 June (20:30 BST) – the first human death from the 2009 swine flu pandemic in the United Kingdom is confirmed by the Scottish Government.
- 15 June – the Commission on Scottish Devolution, chaired by Kenneth Calman, issues its final report, recommending that the Scottish Parliament be given greater control over tax and legislation such as setting speed limits.
- 25–28 June – Royal Highland Show.

=== July ===
- 7 July – Royal Navy Queen Elizabeth-class aircraft carrier HMS Queen Elizabeth (R08) laid down at BAE Systems, Govan; she will be assembled at Rosyth Dockyard.
- 16–19 July – Open Championship, Turnberry (golf course), South Ayrshire.

=== August ===
- 2 August – Catriona Matthew wins the 2009 Women's British Open in golf.
- 11 August – archaeologists announce that they have discovered a royal tomb from the early Bronze Age, at Forteviot.
- 14 August – archaeologists announce that they have discovered a Neolithic temple in the Heart of Neolithic Orkney World Heritage Site.
- 20 August – the Scottish justice secretary Kenny MacAskill grants release to the convicted Lockerbie bomber Abdelbaset al-Megrahi on compassionate grounds, stating that Megrahi is in the final stages of terminal prostate cancer.

=== September ===
- 15 September – Geology of Scotland: Shetland awarded European Geopark status.

=== October ===
- 27 October – the West Highland Free Press becomes the UK's only employee-owned newspaper.

=== November ===
- 16 November – Galloway Forest Park is designated at a dark sky park by the International Dark-Sky Association.
- 20 November – John Swinney, Cabinet Secretary for Finance and Sustainable Growth, wins the Scottish Politician of the Year Award.
- 26 November – BrewDog launches a new beer called Tactical Nuclear Penguin, with 32% alcohol, which is claimed to be the strongest beer ever made.

=== December ===
- 1 December – the first reshuffle of the Scottish Cabinet since the Scottish National Party came to power in May 2007.
- 5–11 December – The 2009 European Curling Championships take place in Aberdeen.
- 16 December – Scotland's largest airline, Flyglobespan, goes into administration.
- 17 December – archaeologists announce that they have found man-made structures on the sea-bed off the island of Damsay, Orkney.
- 20 December – Richie Ramsay wins the South African Open (golf), Scotland's first win on the European Tour since Alastair Forsyth won the Madeira Island Open in March 2008.
- 21 December – Fraochy Bay Gaelic-language television cartoon series first airs.
- 30 December – three climbers are killed following three large avalanches in the Scottish mountains.

== Deaths ==
=== January ===
- 7 January – Alfie Conn Sr., footballer (born 1926)
- 29 January – John Martyn, singer-songwriter (born 1948)

=== February ===
- 6 February – Bashir Ahmad, Scottish National Party MSP for Glasgow (born 1940)
- 17 February – Victor Kiernan, Marxist historian (born 1913 in England)
- 19 February – Anna Watt, variety entertainer (born 1924)

=== April ===
- 30 April – Maurice Lindsay, broadcaster, writer and poet (died 1918)

=== June ===
- 7 June – Gordon Lennon, footballer (born 1983)

=== July ===
- 6 July – Jim Reid, folk musician (born 1934)
- 29 July – Paul McGrillen, footballer, by suicide (born 1971)

=== September ===
- 23 September – Bill Speirs, general secretary of the Scottish Trades Union Congress, and key figure on the left of the Scottish Labour Party, and in the campaign for Scottish devolution, instrumental in the creation of Scotland United, a member of the Scottish Constitutional Convention and a member of the group that drafted the key document Scotland's Parliament, Scotland's Right in 1995 (born 1952)
- 28 September – Reverend Maxwell Craig, the Extra Chaplain to the Queen

=== October ===
- 11 October – Abigail McLellan, painter (born 1969)

=== December ===
- 1 December – Cordelia Oliver, journalist, painter and art critic (born 1923)

== The Arts ==
- 17–28 June – Edinburgh International Film Festival.
- September – Emma's Imagination releases her debut single, "Stamp Your Feet", on Glasgow independent label Up Next Records.
- 23 November – Susan Boyle's first album, I Dreamed a Dream becomes Amazon's best-selling album in pre-sales.
- Peter Maxwell Davies composes his string sextet The Last Island.

== See also ==
- 2009 in England
- 2009 in Northern Ireland
- 2009 in Wales
