= 2008 in Scottish television =

This is a list of events in Scottish television from 2008.

== Events ==
=== February ===
- 27 February – In a speech to the Royal Television Society in Glasgow, Scotland's First Minister Alex Salmond criticises broadcasters such as BBC Scotland and STV for not providing live coverage of Scotland's international football matches.

=== May ===
- 22 May – After over 50 years on air STV's Scotsport airs for the last time.
- 24 June – SMG plc announces another name change – this time to STV Group plc.

=== September ===
- 8 September – A report by the Scottish Broadcasting Commission recommends that up to £75 million of public funds should be used to create a high quality Scottish television channel.
- 19 September – Launch of the Scottish Gaelic television channel BBC Alba.
- 22 September – The launch of BBC Alba sees the first edition of a new Scottish Gaelic news bulletin called An Là.

=== October ===
- 1 October – Scottish Media Group is rebranded STV Group plc. It does this because it wants to highlight its renewed focus on television.

=== November ===
- November – A History of Scotland presented by historian Neil Oliver debuts on BBC One in Scotland. It is shown national on BBC Two from January 2009.
- November – STV announces its intention to opt out of ITV1 programmes they claim are not performing well in their broadcast region. These include series such as Sharpe's Peril, Al Murray's Happy Hour, Moving Wallpaper, Benidorm and The Alan Titchmarsh Show. ITV's coverage of the FA Cup is also dropped.

== Debuts ==
=== BBC ===
- November – A History of Scotland on BBC One
- Unknown – Trusadh on BBC Alba (2008–present)

== Television series ==
- Reporting Scotland (1968–1983; 1984–present)
- Scotland Today (1972–2009)
- Sportscene (1975–present)
- The Beechgrove Garden (1978–present)
- North Tonight (1980–2009)
- Taggart (1983–2010)
- Only an Excuse? (1993–2020)
- River City (2002–2026)
- Politics Now (2004–2011)
- The Adventure Show (2005–present)
- GMTV Scotland (2007–present)

== Ending this year ==
- 22 February – That Was The Team That Was (2006–2008)
- April – VideoGaiden (2005–2008)
- 22 May – Scotsport (1957–2008)

== Deaths ==
- 13 June – John Malcolm, 72, actor
- 27 July – Bob Crampsey, 78, historian, author and broadcaster

== See also ==
- 2008 in Scotland
