= 2009 in Scottish television =

This is a list of events in Scottish television from 2009.

== Events ==
=== March ===
- 20 March – STV North's regional news programme North Tonight ends after 29 years on air.
- 22 March – STV Central's regional news programme Scotland Today ends after 37 years on air.
- 23 March – Launch of the new look news programme STV News at Six in STV's North and Central regions.

=== July ===
- July – The BBC Trust writes to the UK government asking for it to guarantee that future Scotland football internationals are broadcast on terrestrial television.
- July – Launch of STV Player allowing Internet users to view STV programmes online.
- July – STV announces that it is withdrawing some ITV1 networked programmes such as The Bill, Doc Martin, Midsomer Murders, Poirot and Lewis from its schedules, instead preferring to concentrate on programming made within Scotland.

=== August ===
- 28 August – At the Edinburgh International Television Festival News Corporation Chairman James Murdoch delivers the MacTaggart Memorial Lecture in which he launches an attack on the BBC and UK media regulator Ofcom.

=== September ===
- 22 September – ITV plc launches legal proceedings against STV for a quoted unpaid debt of £38 million from network programming contributions, following STV's practice of dropping a number of network programmes on the STV franchise. At the same time, STV claims it is also following procedures against ITV plc, for up to £40 million owed to STV under its advertising sales agreements.

=== October ===
- 26 October – The BBC Trust announces a review of the Gaelic language channel BBC Alba to assess its impact on viewers.

== Debuts ==
=== BBC ===
- 22 March – Sport Nation on BBC Two (2009–present)
- 21 October – Gary: Tank Commander (2009–2012)

=== ITV ===
- 17 January – wknd@stv (2009)
- 23 March – STV News at Six (2009–present)
- 26 May – The Hour (2009–2011)
- 6 September – STV Rugby (2009–2010; 2011–present)

== Television series ==
- Reporting Scotland (1968–1983; 1984–present)
- Sportscene (1975–present)
- The Beechgrove Garden (1978–present)
- Taggart (1983–2010)
- Only an Excuse? (1993–2020)
- River City (2002–2026)
- Politics Now (2004–2011)
- The Adventure Show (2005–present)
- GMTV Scotland (2007–present)
- Trusadh (2008–present)

== Ending this year ==
- 20 March – North Tonight (1980–2009)
- 22 March – Scotland Today (1972–2009)

== Deaths ==
- 30 April – Maurice Lindsay, 91, broadcaster
- 15 September – Troy Kennedy Martin, 77, screenwriter

== See also ==
- 2009 in Scotland
