= 2007 in Scottish television =

This is a list of events in Scottish television from 2007.

== Events ==
=== January ===
- 7 January – Death of television presenter Magnus Magnusson, long-time presenter of the BBC's Mastermind.
- 8 January – STV launches separate news services for the East and West of the STV Central region, initially as a five-minute opt out within the 6:00 pm edition of Scotland Today on weeknights. STV also launches two editions of North Tonight begin to receive two different programmes - those in the Dundee, Angus, Perthshire and north-east Fife area receive a dedicated bulletin within the main North Tonight programme.
- 10 January – Scottish Media Group and Belfast-based UTV agree the details of a merger, including a revised share split between the two. UTV will own 54% of the group, while SMG will take the remaining 46%. However, the deal is once again rejected at the end of February.

=== April ===
- 12 April – SMG Group plc announce plans to sell Virgin Radio, to enable the company to focus on its television station, STV.

=== May ===
- 3 May – Television coverage of the 2007 Scottish Parliament election.

=== June ===
- 7 June – The long-running Scottish Six debate over a separate BBC Six O'Clock News bulletin for Scotland is reignited after the Scottish National Party's Pete Wishart writes to the BBC Director General Mark Thompson calling for a Scottish news programme to be introduced.

=== July ===
- 18 July – It is announced that the Scottish Premier League has signed a deal with BBC Scotland for non-exclusive television coverage of the league.

=== August ===
- August – The Scottish Government establishes the Scottish Broadcasting Commission to oversee television production and broadcasting in Scotland.
- 31 August – STV celebrates fifty years on air.

=== September ===
- 20 September – British Prime Minister Gordon Brown opens the BBC Scotland's new Pacific Quay studio complex in Glasgow. At the opening ceremony BBC Director-General Mark Thompson outlines plans to increase BBC Scotland's content output.

=== October ===
- 26 October – Inaugural meeting of the Scottish Broadcasting Commission. Chaired by Blair Jenkins the Commission hopes to take television in Scotland "to a different level".

=== December ===
- 3 December – News opt-outs for Scotland during GMTV are taken over by MacMillan Media following a long-running dispute between GMTV and STV. Previously STV and Grampian had provided local news coverage during GMTV.

== Debuts ==
=== BBC ===
- 26 February – The Adventure Show on BBC Two (2007–present)

=== ITV ===
- 3 December – GMTV Scotland on STV (2007–2012)

== Television series ==
- Scotsport (1957–2008)
- Reporting Scotland (1968–1983; 1984–present)
- Scotland Today (1972–2009)
- Sportscene (1975–present)
- The Beechgrove Garden (1978–present)
- North Tonight (1980–2009)
- Taggart (1983–2010)
- Only an Excuse? (1993–2020)
- River City (2002–2026)
- Politics Now (2004–2011)
- VideoGaiden (2005–2008)
- The Adventure Show (2007–present)
- That Was The Team That Was (2006–2008)

== Ending this year ==
- 31 December – Still Game (2002–2007; 2016–2019)

== Deaths ==
- 7 January – Magnus Magnusson, 79, broadcaster and presenter
- 9 February – Ian Richardson, 72, actor

== See also ==
- 2007 in Scotland
