= Biggleton =

- Genre: Children
- Country of origin: United Kingdom
- Original language: English
- No. of series: 2

Production
- Running time: 10 minutes
- Production company: BBC Children's Productions

Original release
- Network: CBeebies
- Release: 27 November 2017 – 18 January 2019

Biggleton is a British children's television series, produced by and for the BBC channel CBeebies from 27 November 2017 to 18 January 2019, and narrated by Eamonn Holmes in series one, and John Gordon Sinclair in series two.
