= John Gordon Sinclair =

Scottish actor

- Born: Gordon John Sinclair; 4 February 1962 (age 64); Glasgow, Scotland
- Occupations: Actor, voice actor
- Years active: 1981–present

John Gordon Sinclair (born Gordon John Sinclair; 4 February 1962) is a Scottish actor. He is best known for playing Gregory in the film Gregory's Girl (1981). In 2019, Sinclair played Drew Cubbin in the BBC drama Traces.

== Life and career ==
Sinclair was born on 4 February 1962 in Glasgow and started work as an apprentice electrician. There was a Gordon Sinclair already registered with the Equity trade union, so he took John Gordon Sinclair as his professional name.

At 15, he joined Glasgow's Youth Theatre after he visited one night and met Robert Buchanan, a fellow fan of Canadian progressive rock group Rush. As a result, he starred in a number of films by director Bill Forsyth, perhaps the most notable of which is 1981's Gregory's Girl, shot when he was 19 years old. He reprised the role nearly two decades later in Gregory's Two Girls (1999), and also appeared in Forsyth's Local Hero (1983). His other film roles included appearances in Britannia Hospital (1982), The Girl in the Picture (1985), and Erik the Viking (1989).

He has continued to act on stage and screen. Other roles include parts in Goodbye Mr Steadman, Mad About Alice (2004), and Roman Road (2004). He was also in the first series of LWT's Hot Metal (1986) and both the radio and television sitcom An Actor's Life For Me (1989–1993). He played Dan Weir in Espedair Street (1998), the BBC Radio 4 adaptation of the Iain Banks novel, as well as playing the lead part of Dr. Finlay in the Radio 4 series entitled Adventures of a Black Bag (2001–02). He also made a brief appearance in one episode of Bergerac ("Ninety percent proof") in 1983.

He appeared in the 1982 Scottish squad's World Cup song "We Have a Dream", a number 5 hit in the UK, which was written and performed by B. A. Robertson, with Sinclair speaking his recollection of a dream about Scottish football success. He later revived this Scottish footballing connection by narrating the 2006–07 BBC Scotland documentary series That Was The Team That Was.

Sinclair played Frank McClusky, a leading character, in the 1990 John Byrne TV serial Your Cheatin' Heart. He played one of the main characters in the Tesco TV adverts in the late 1990s and early 2000s alongside Prunella Scales and Jane Horrocks. He most recently appeared in the London's West End in The Producers playing the part of Leo Bloom alongside Fred Applegate. In 1998, he performed as one of the Penguins in the TV adaptation of PB Bear and Friends. He voiced Tom Fetch in Fetch the Vet. He voiced all the male characters (except for Finbar) in HIT Entertainment's Rubbadubbers. He also played P. K. in the UK version of Fraggle Rock. He was awarded the Laurence Olivier Theatre Award in 1995 for Best Actor in a Musical for his 1994 performance in She Loves Me. Sinclair also performed the part of "Master of Ceremonies" in Mike Oldfield's premiere performance of Tubular Bells II at Edinburgh Castle in 1992.

In 2013, he appeared in World War Z. In 2018, he played Richard, attorney for the title character (Trine Dyrholm) in the film Nico, 1988. He narrates Biggleton (series 2) on CBeebies, replacing Eamonn Holmes. In 2019, he appeared as Drew Cubbin, Emma's father and ex-partner of Marie Monroe in the TV series Traces.

== Novelist ==
His novel Seventy Times Seven, a violent thriller set in 1992, was published in 2012.

This was followed by Blood Whispers in 2014 and Walk in Silence in 2017.

== Personal life ==
In 2004, he married Shauna McKeon. They have two daughters.
