= List of acts of the Scottish Parliament from 2006 =

This is a list of acts of the Scottish Parliament passed in 2006. Acts of the Scottish Parliament are enacted by the Scottish Parliament, which has legislative authority over devolved matters in relation to Scotland under the authority of the Scotland Act 1998. Acts are cited by calendar year, in the same fashion as acts of Parliament of the United Kingdom. Each act passed in a respective year is numbered consecutively with Arabic numerals, following the prefix "asp".

17 acts of the Scottish Parliament were passed in 2006.

indicates that an act has been transcribed on Wikisource, indicates that an act is available to view at legislation.gov.uk, and indicates the location of the original act in the Parliamentary Archives.

== Acts of the Scottish Parliament ==
Short title	Citation	Royal assent
Long title
Housing (Scotland) Act 2006	2006 asp 1	5 January 2006
An Act of the Scottish Parliament to make provision about housing standards; to confer a right to adapt rented houses to meet the needs of disabled occupants; to provide for the giving of assistance by local authorities in connection with work carried out in relation to houses; to require certain information to be made available on the sale of houses; to regulate the multiple occupation of houses and certain other types of living accommodation; to make provision about mobile homes; to make provision about matters to be considered by local authorities when assessing suitability of persons to act as a landlord; and for connected purposes.
Family Law (Scotland) Act 2006	2006 asp 2	20 January 2006
An Act of the Scottish Parliament to amend the law in relation to marriage, divorce and the jurisdiction of the courts in certain consistorial actions; to amend the Matrimonial Homes (Family Protection) (Scotland) Act 1981; (Note: Matrimonial Homes (Family Protection) (Scotland) Act 1981 (c. 59)) to amend the law relating to the domicile of persons who are under 16 years of age; to make further provision as respects responsibilities and rights in relation to children; to make provision conferring rights in relation to property, succession and claims in damages for persons living, or having lived, together as if husband and wife or civil partners; to amend Part 3 of the Civil Partnership Act 2004; (Note: Civil Partnership Act 2004 (c. 33)) to make further provision in relation to persons entitled to damages under the Damages (Scotland) Act 1976; (Note: Damages (Scotland) Act 1976 (c. 13)) to make provision in relation to certain rules of private international law relating to family law; to make incompetent actions for declarator of freedom and putting to silence; and for connected purposes.
Joint Inspection of Children's Services and Inspection of Social Work Services (Scotland) Act 2006	2006 asp 3	22 February 2006
An Act of the Scottish Parliament to make provision for the carrying out of joint inspections of the provision of services to children; and to make provision as to the appointment of persons to act as social work inspectors and their functions.
Human Tissue (Scotland) Act 2006	2006 asp 4	16 March 2006
An Act of the Scottish Parliament to make provision in relation to activities involving human tissue.
Budget (Scotland) Act 2006	2006 asp 5	21 March 2006
An Act of the Scottish Parliament to make provision, for financial year 2006/07, for the use of resources by the Scottish Administration and certain bodies whose expenditure is payable out of the Scottish Consolidated Fund, for authorising the payment of sums out of the Fund and for the maximum amounts of borrowing by certain statutory bodies; to make provision, for financial year 2007/08, for authorising the payment of sums out of the Fund on a temporary basis; and for connected purposes.
Edinburgh Tram (Line Two) Act 2006	2006 asp 6	27 April 2006
An Act of the Scottish Parliament to authorise the construction and operation of a tram line in Edinburgh following a western course from St Andrew Square, via Princes Street, Haymarket, Murrayfield and South Gyle to Edinburgh Airport and Newbridge; and for connected purposes.
Edinburgh Tram (Line One) Act 2006	2006 asp 7	8 May 2006
An Act of the Scottish Parliament to authorise the construction and operation of a tram line in Edinburgh forming a loop from St Andrew Square, along Leith Walk to Leith, west to Granton, south to Haymarket and back to St Andrew Square via Princes Street; and for connected purposes.
Scottish Schools (Parental Involvement) Act 2006	2006 asp 8	14 June 2006
An Act of the Scottish Parliament to make further provision for the involvement of parents in their children's education and in school education generally; to provide for the establishment of councils to represent the parents of pupils attending public schools; to abolish School Boards; to make further provision as regards the appointment of teachers; to make further provision as regards the content of the development plan for a school; and for connected purposes.
Senior Judiciary (Vacancies and Incapacity) (Scotland) Act 2006	2006 asp 9	27 June 2006
An Act of the Scottish Parliament to make provision for the exercise of functions during vacancies in the offices of Lord President of the Court of Session and Lord Justice Clerk and the incapacity of the holders of those offices.
Police, Public Order and Criminal Justice (Scotland) Act 2006	2006 asp 10	4 July 2006
An Act of the Scottish Parliament to make further provision about the police; to make further provision about public order and safety; to make further provision about criminal justice; and for connected purposes.
Animal Health and Welfare (Scotland) Act 2006	2006 asp 11	11 July 2006
An Act of the Scottish Parliament to amend the Animal Health Act 1981, (Note: Animal Health Act 1981 (c. 22)) including by making provision for preventing the spread of disease; to make provision for the welfare of animals, including for prevention of harm; and for connected purposes.
Interests of Members of the Scottish Parliament Act 2006	2006 asp 12	13 July 2006
An Act of the Scottish Parliament to make provision (including provision for the purposes of section 39 of the Scotland Act 1998) (Note: Scotland Act 1998 (c. 46)) about the registration and declaration of interests of members of the Scottish Parliament and the prohibition of advocacy by such members in return for payment or benefit in kind; and for connected purposes.
Waverley Railway (Scotland) Act 2006	2006 asp 13	24 July 2006
An Act of the Scottish Parliament to authorise the reconstruction of a railway from a point in Midlothian immediately south of Newcraighall in the City of Edinburgh to Tweedbank in Scottish Borders, including stations at Shawfair, Eskbank, Newtongrange, Gorebridge, Stow, Galashiels and Tweedbank; to make provision concerning planning agreements and developer contributions relating to the railway; and for connected purposes.
Local Electoral Administration and Registration Services (Scotland) Act 2006	2006 asp 14	1 August 2006
An Act of the Scottish Parliament to make provision in relation to the administration and conduct of local government elections; to reorganise local registration services; to amend the law in relation to the registration of births and deaths and the procedure in relation to marriages and civil partnerships; to provide for the recording of certain events occurring outwith Scotland in relation to persons who have a Scottish connection; to make available certain information and records held by the Registrar General; and for connected purposes.
Tourist Boards (Scotland) Act 2006	2006 asp 15	30 November 2006
An Act of the Scottish Parliament to rename the Scottish Tourist Board, to increase the maximum number of members of that body and to abolish area tourist boards.
Scottish Commission for Human Rights Act 2006	2006 asp 16	8 December 2006
An Act of the Scottish Parliament to provide for the establishment and functions of the Scottish Commission for Human Rights.
Planning etc. (Scotland) Act 2006	2006 asp 17	20 December 2006
An Act of the Scottish Parliament to make further provision relating to town and country planning; to make provision for business improvement districts; and for connected purposes.

== See also ==
- List of acts of the Scottish Parliament
