= 2026 National Year of Reading =

UK literacy promotion initiative

The 2026 National Year of Reading is an initiative started by the Labour Government in the United Kingdom. Launched with the Department for Education (DfE) and the National Literacy Trust.

The National Year of Reading was announced on 7th July 2025 and launched in January 2026 at the Emirates Stadium under the campaign identity “Go All In”.

== Events ==
Supporting the initiative, on the 2 February to the 8 February the National week of storytelling took place.

The goal was to encourage people to read because of the decline in reading levels following up to 2026. Shown from a study.

== Topics ==
To do this the initiative supported multiple topics:

Sport, Music, Horror, Comedy, TV/Film and Gaming.

== See also ==
- 2008 National Year of Reading
- 1998 National Year of Reading
