= 2008 National Year of Reading =

The 2008 National Year of Reading was a year-long celebration of reading, in all its forms. It aimed to help build a greater national passion for reading in England – for children, families and adult learners alike.

The Secretary of State for Children, Schools and Families, Ed Balls, joined the prime minister, Gordon Brown, children, writers, and reading champions at 10 Downing Street on 8 January 2008. He called for every employer, school, library, college and local authority to get involved.

== Purpose ==
The year aimed to encourage people to read in businesses, homes, and communities around the country, providing new opportunities to read and helping people to access help and support through schools and libraries.

== Partners ==
The National Year of Reading was led by the National Literacy Trust, The Reading Agency and a consortium which comprises:

- Arts Council England
- Museums, Libraries and Archives Council
- The National Youth Agency
- NIACE

== Monthly themes ==
Activities in the National Year of Reading included the following themes:

- April: Read all about it! Links to newspapers and magazines; library membership campaign.
- May: Mind and Body. Reading and learning at work. The knock-on benefits of reading.
- June: Reading escapes. Holiday and summer reads.
- July: Rhythm and Rhyme. Poems, poetry and lyrics.
- August: Read the Game. The influence of sport and how this can help promote reading.
- September: You are what you read. Cultural, personal and local identity.
- October: Word of Mouth. Storytelling, reading out loud, reading together, reading aloud, live literature.
- November: Screen reads. Exploring the diversity of reading and writing; scripts, TV and films.
- December: Write the future. Writing, texting, blogging etc.

== Values ==
Shared values underpinned the consortium and sat at the heart of the year. These were:

- Impact – both personal and social
- Celebration – positive, enjoyable experiences
- Diversity – of reading experiences and communities
- Participation – co-production of the year with communities and partners
- Creativity in development and delivery
- Legacy – to create a lasting change in lives and systems

== Legacy ==
The work of the 2008 National Year of Reading has been continued by the Reading for Life campaign, run by the National Literacy Trust. See the National Literacy Trust Wikipedia page for more information.

2026 has also been designated as a National Year of Reading see 2026 National Year of Reading.
