= Penhallow Hotel fire =

2007 fire in Cornwall, England

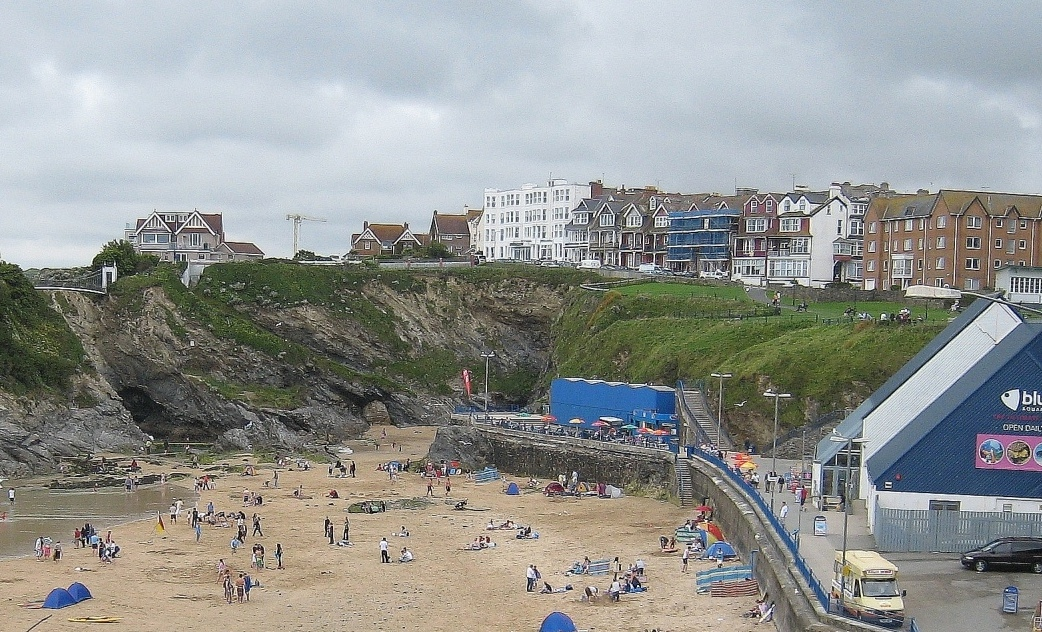
- Towan Beach in Newquay, 28 July 2007. The Penhallow Hotel, the large bright white building, can be seen near the centre of the image, on top of the cliffs. This photo was taken only 21 days before the fire.
- Date: 18 August 2007
- Venue: Penhallow Hotel
- Location: Newquay, Cornwall, United Kingdom; 50°24′54″N 5°04′52″W
- Type: Suspected arson
- Deaths: 3
- Injuries: 5
- Inquest: Open verdict

The Penhallow Hotel fire was a suspected arson attack that occurred in Newquay, Cornwall on 18 August 2007. Three people were killed and it was reported as the worst hotel fire in the United Kingdom in nearly 40 years. The hotel was a well-known hotel for holiday makers ranging from families to older residents. It had been built in Island Crescent between 1912 and 1917, and had been altered more than once. The building had a wooden fire escape at the rear, and a central light shaft running from the ground floor up to the roof in the centre of the hotel. Both of these aspects of the building played a dramatic role in the outcome of the fire. Many of those that escaped the fire were elderly holiday makers.

Police at the time concluded that the fire must have been started by an intentional act. However the inquest returned open verdicts as the coroner said there was insufficient evidence to rule the victims were unlawfully killed. A link has been suggested between the fire and Karen Pedley, a serial arsonist at large in Cornwall at the time.

The remainder of the building was demolished, and the land has since been redeveloped as modern apartments.

== Fire ==
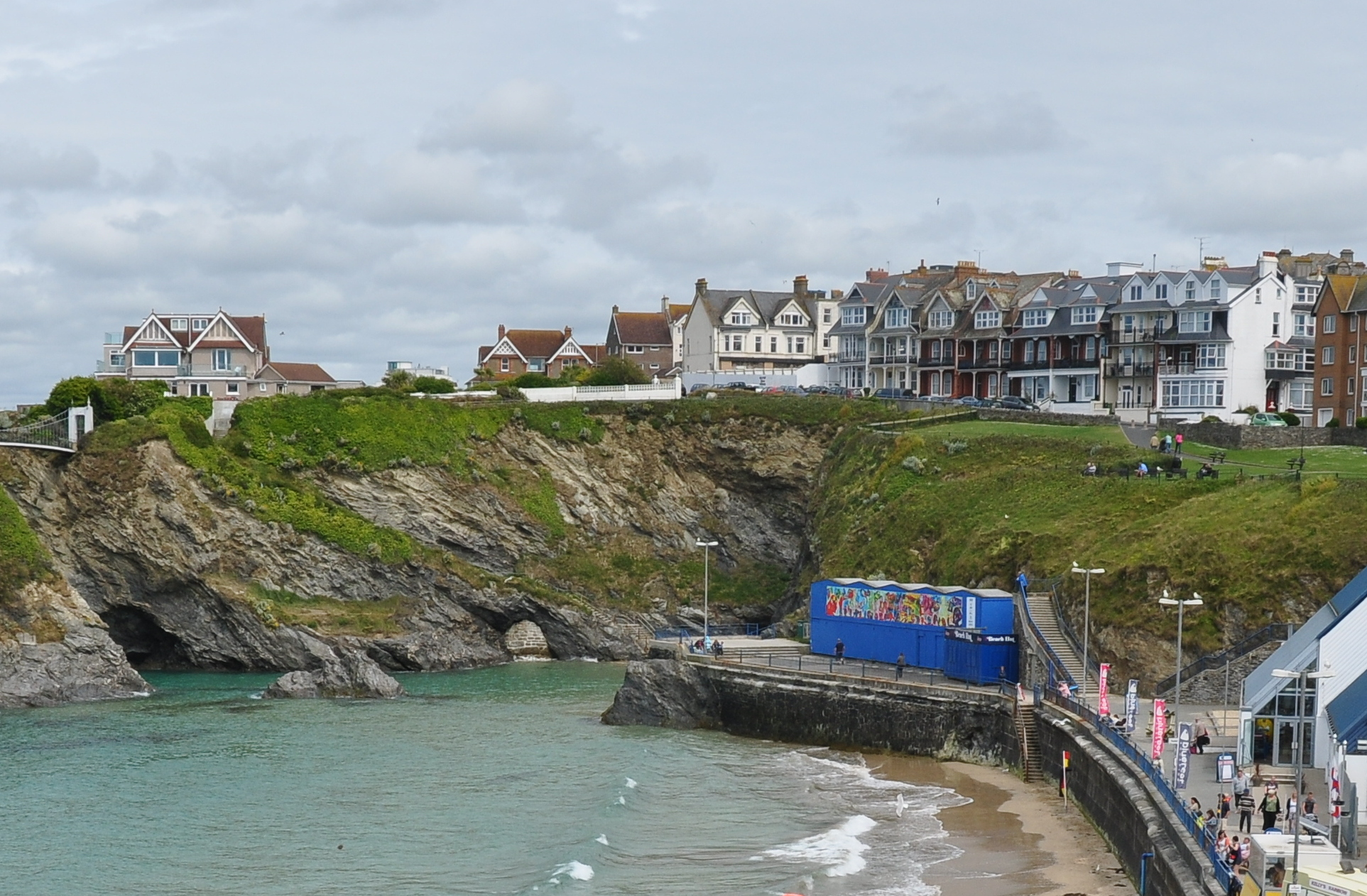
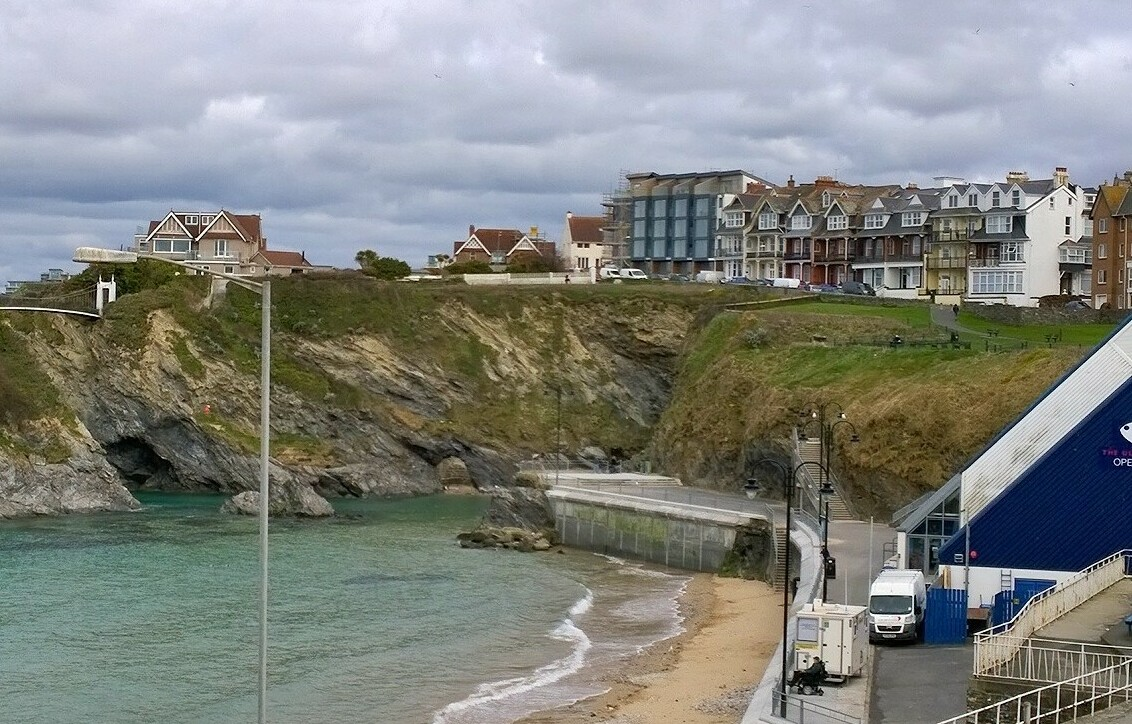
The cliffs above Towan Beach in 2011 following the fire, showing the Penhallow Hotel in the centre of the image having been destroyed, and the beach in 2016, showing the new apartments built on the site of the hotel

On the night of 18 August 2007, shortly after midnight a power cut was reported followed shortly by the fire alarm activating and soon smoke was seen in the building. It is believed that the fire started in the hotel's drink bar store and then spread throughout the building. A 999 call was made to Cornwall Fire Brigade's fire control at 00:17 and appliances from Newquay were mobilised. Around 4 minutes later, when the first crews arrived on scene, it was reported that the building was well alight and further crews were requested. At the peak of the blaze 100 firefighters were fighting flames that were 30 feet (9.1 m) high.

Some guests woke to the sound of the fire alarm sounding with no immediate signs of smoke or fire. Others reported that the fire alarm could not be heard on the third floor of the hotel, and being hampered in evacuation due to suitcases and obstacles being left in the hallways. Witnesses and guests also spoke of short comings by fire officials as the fire brigade arrived without a ladder long enough to reach the victims on the third floor. A guest spoke of how upon viewing the engine; "I could see no ladder on the fire engine. There was just an engine with a hose."

Over 90 guests and members of staff managed to escape, but three people were killed in the fire. Guest Peter Hughes (a science teacher aged 43 from Staffordshire) died as a result of falling from a second floor window. Hughes' mother Monica (aged 86) also died in the blaze, along with 80-year-old Joan Harper, who was also from Staffordshire.

== Investigation ==
Cornwall Fire and Rescue Service (CFRS) was criticised on how the incident was handled. It was reported that only one fire appliance could be mobilised from Newquay due to a shortage of crew, one appliance was sent and backup was drawn in from surrounding stations, however as previously stated the fire had taken hold by the time of arrival of the first crew. It was found that the shortcoming of appliances did not result in the three deaths. However CFRS upgraded Newquay fire station to 24-hour cover during the summer months when the population rises from an estimated 24,000 to at least 100,000.

At the inquest it was discovered that other factors were seen in the case against the owners of the hotel. Factors for the fire and the poor response were poor fire risk assessment, poor access, lack of water, lack of equipment (high rise ladder) and the FRS (Fire and Rescue Service) being sent to the wrong address.

== Suggested links to Karen Pedley ==
Penhallow Hotel fire (Cornwall)

In 2019, a former detective on the investigation into Karen Pedley, a serial arsonist who was active in Cornwall between 2002 and 2010, suggested a link between her and the Penhallow fire. Pedley, from Carharrack, had apparently become obsessed with fire as a child when she became famous locally for saving her family from a night-time house fire. In 2016 she was convicted of setting fires in a number of buildings across Cornwall between 2002 and 2010, one of which in 2008 had killed an elderly patient in her care (she was also convicted of murder). Pedley specifically targeted buildings that were known to house the elderly like the Penhallow Hotel, and her motive for her arson attacks was that she was affected by hero syndrome, whereby she started the fires in order to act as the hero by subsequently saving people from it. The lead detective speaking after the Penhallow Hotel fire said they believed that the person who had started the fire had "created a dramatic event to be the centre of attention" in order to try to be a hero.

== Legal ==
In 2007, Devon and Cornwall Police stated they would treat the fire as a "major crime" until they found evidence to the contrary. In January 2008, police announced that the fire was being treated as suspicious, and that the deaths were now therefore potential cases of murder.

At the inquest into the deaths in 2009, the coroner found there was insufficient evidence to determine that the victims were unlawfully killed, and recorded an open verdict. In 2010, Cornwall Council and Cornwall Fire Service brought a civil suit against the owners of Penhallow Hotel and individual staff members for health and safety violations. The owners, O&C Holdsworth, admitted to two of the charges and were fined £80,000 and ordered to pay £62,000 in costs.

== See also ==
- List of building or structure fires
