= Eunice Spry =

British criminal

- Born: 28 April 1944 (age 82)
- Status: Released June 2014 after serving 7 years and two months of her 14 year sentence
- Convictions: Assault, perverting the course of justice
- Criminal charges: Assault, perverting the course of justice
- Penalty: 14 years' imprisonment

Details
- Date: 1986 – 2005

Eunice Spry (born 28 April 1944) is a British woman from Tewkesbury, Gloucestershire, who was convicted of 26 charges of child abuse against children in her foster care in April 2007.

== Evidence and sentencing ==
Spry forced three children in her care (two foster, one adopted) to eat their own excrement and vomit, rammed sticks down the children's throats, rubbed their faces with sandpaper, and locked two of them naked in a room for a month. Spry also had two other children in her care at this time, one adopted daughter and one adopted son (Christopher's younger brother), but these children did not experience the same kind of abuse that the aforementioned three did.

She was sentenced to 14 years' imprisonment and ordered to pay £80,000 costs. In sentencing, the judge told Spry that it was the "worst case in his 40 years practising law". In September 2008, Spry's sentence was reduced by the High Court to 12 years. On 30 May 2014 the Gloucestershire Echo indicated she would be released in June 2014.

== Aftermath ==
Two of her foster children and her adopted daughter have published books about their childhoods: her oldest foster son, Christopher Spry, nicknamed 'Child C', published a book of the same name about his childhood living with Eunice Spry; her foster daughter, Alloma Gilbert, published Deliver Me from Evil; Victoria Spry published Tortured in April 2015.

In September 2020, Victoria Spry died by suicide. Her siblings allege that residual trauma from the abuse she suffered led to her death.
