= Hamish Barber =

Scottish physician (1933–2007)

- Born: James Hill Barber; 28 June 1933; Dunfermline, Scotland
- Died: 26 August 2007 (aged 74)
- Education: University of Edinburgh
- Years active: 1957–1993
- Known for: first professor of General Practice at the University of Glasgow
- Medical career
- Profession: doctor
- Field: General Practitioner

James Hill "Hamish" Barber FRCGP (28 May 1933 – 26 August 2007) was a doctor and medical academic. He was the first professor of general practice at the University of Glasgow and wrote the first comprehensive textbook in this field.

== Early life ==
Barber was born on 28 May 1933 in Dunfermline, Scotland.

== Medical career ==
Barber qualified from the University of Edinburgh in 1957. He gained a MD in 1966 with a thesis entitled A Study of Asymptomatic Bacteriuria in General Practice.

In 1972 he was appointed as senior lecturer in the organisation of medical care at the University of Glasgow. In 1974 he became the first professor of General Practice at the University. Computer-assisted learning was introduced during his tenure.

Together with Andrew Boddy, he wrote The Textbook of General Practice Medicine which was published in 1975. At just over 350 pages it was the first comprehensive textbook of this specialty.

He retired in 1993.

== Later life and death ==
He made model boats and wrote a book on the topic that was published in 2005: Scottish fishing vessels of the nineteenth century, a guide to building scale model boats.

After a long illness, he died on 26 August 2007.
