= Fraochy Bay =

- Created by: Neil Stewart
- Written by: Neil Stewart; David Maclennan; Philip Wright
- Country of origin: Scotland
- No. of series: 5
- No. of episodes: 60

Production
- Producer: Kenny Stewart
- Running time: 5 minutes
- Production company: Moja Tv

Original release
- Network: BBC Alba
- Release: 21 December 2009 – 1 March 2015

Fraochy Bay is a Scottish Gaelic-language animated television series created by Neillydubh Animation Limited and produced by Moja TV for BBC Alba and funded by MG Alba. The series is set in the fictional town of Fraochy Bay, notionally located somewhere off the west coast of Scotland, with no central theme other than an exploration of the slightly odd characters and surreal events that take place in and around the town.

The series debuted on BBC Alba in late 2009 with its first three episodes airing on 21, 22 and 23 December.

Series four's original run began in April 2013 with a fifth series following in October 2014 until 1 March 2015.

== Episodes ==
=== Season 1 (2009–2010) ===
#	Title	Summary	Original air date
1	Who Dares Winds	Top secret special force soldiers go on operations in the Fraochy Bay hills.	21 December 2009
2	A Car for All Seasons	Wilhelmina's car breaks down.	22 December 2009
3	I Wandered Lonely as a Clod	Poet-in-residence Torquil Farquhar de Smith tries to capture Fraochy Bay in verse.	23 December 2009
4	Is There a Doctor in the House?	If you're unwell in Fraochy Bay then the Cottage Hospital is the place to avoid.	24 December 2009
5	To Be or Not to Be, Those Are the Questions	Davey Jones takes Laura the librarian to his theatre rehearsal.	28 December 2009
6	Why DID the Chicken Cross the Road?	Feathers fly at the local art gallery as a thief makes an unwelcome appearance.	29 December 2009
7	I Can't Believe It's Not Butler	It's a tale of mystery and suspense at a Fraochy Bay stately home.	30 December 2009
8	A Builder's Life for Me	Local builders the James Brothers get their priorities mixed up.	20 February 2010
9	Hair Today, Gone Tomorrow	Hairdresser Kylie Wylie fits Police Constable Dunstable with a wig for the policeman's dinner.	27 February 2010
10	Opera, a Verdi Nice Thing	With nothing to watch on television, Ina and Jessie attend the opera.	6 March 2010
11	A Life on the Ocean Wave	Fishermen Dick Fish and Harry Crab are marooned on a deserted island after battling a large whale.	7 April 2010
12	A Policeman's Lot Is Not a Happy One	Officer Maclean helps Farmer Gillies to solve a crime.	14 April 2010
13	Jurassic Pork	A Fraochy Bay dinosaur develops toothache and heads into town to find a dentist.	20 April 2010
14	The Day of the Sheep	Sinister sheep descend from the hills at night to eat everything in Fraochy Bay.	28 April 2010
15	Play It Again Sham	Sheena Herzogg has a dire emergency down at the dance studio.	1 May 2010
16	One Small Stoop for Man	A Russian submarine surfaces near Fraochy Bay in the dead of night.	21 August 2010
17	A Total Eclipse of the Scone	Eldred Wolfsbane meets a band of mystical travelers searching for the meaning of life.	28 August 2010
18	Fraochy Buth	Calum French can't resist being influenced by the power of advertising.	4 September 2010
19	Radio Killed the Gramophone Star	TV star Mike 'Davey' Maclafferty visits some notable enterprises in Froachy Bay.	11 September 2010
20	The End Is Near	Fraochy Bay hosts a highland gathering complete with bagpipes, strongmen and space exploration.	18 September 2010

=== Season 2 (2010–2011) ===
#	Title	Summary	Original air date
21	The Oily Bird Catches the Worm	Fraochy Bay experiences an oil boom.	20 November 2010
22	Ice Station Hippo	An iceberg breaks loose and races towards town carrying a polar bear with it.	25 November 2010
23	Abandon Sheep	Farmer McClintock's sheep stage a rebellion on Sheep Island.	5 December 2010
24	Crumple of the Bailey	Fraochy Bay's Sheriff Court is now in session.	11 December 2010
25	We All Live in an Orange Submarine	Zac has never settled into a normal life and wants one last shot at pop stardom.	18 December 2010
26	Snowbells in the Sleigh	It's Christmas in Fraochy Bay.	24 December 2010
27	Happy New Year and a Bit	Fraochy Bay is getting ready for the New Year but the clock tower has no bells.	29 December 2010
28	Watershed Down	Walter McSwain finds himself an unwitting participant in a bizarre makeover show.	15 October 2011
29	Kung Phew	A wrestling troupe lays down the gauntlet in Fraochy Bay.	25 October 2011
30	Hammer House of Hammers	Ina and Jessie go on holiday to relax, but find some strange goings-on in the woods.	29 October 2011

=== Season 3 (2012) ===
#	Title	Summary	Original air date
31	Out with the Old and in with the Emergency Services	Ina and Jessie's plumber gets his head wedged down the toilet.	2 June 2012
32	Flume the Bell Tolls	The James brothers are commissioned to build new flumes at the swimming pool.	9 June 2012
33	As Fat as a Butcher's Dog	Ina and Jessie try to train their troublesome dog.	16 June 2012
34	All Creatures Grate and Smell	Fraochy Bay's vet, Dr Domhnall Little, ensures all the animals are healthy.	23 June 2012
35	The Bank That Likes to Say No	Bonkers banking in Fraochy Bay.	30 June 2012
36	Blob the Builder	A huge dough ball known as 'The Blob' escapes the local bakery.	7 July 2012
37	A Picture's Worth a Thousand Pence	Jessie looks in the attic for some old china and finds a lost masterpiece.	14 July 2012
38	The Bottle of Britain	The farmer finds a novel way to deliver pizzas.	21 July 2012
39	Will Ye No Go Back Again	Torquil has a surprise visit from a distant American relative.	28 July 2012
40	Space, the Vinyl Frontier	A comet heads towards Fraochy Bay.	7 August 2012

=== Season 4 (2013) ===
#	Title	Summary	Original air date
41	Where Eagles Daren't	Ina and Jessie take up extreme rock climbing.	23 April 2013
42	A Midge Too Far	Fraochy Bay holds a talent competition.	28 April 2013
43	The Madness of George King	George King sees Fraochy Bay as a potential location for a meditation centre aimed at stressed rich people.	5 May 2013
44	Grillers in the Midst	A chimpanzee escapes from Oban Zoo to wreak havoc on Fraochy Bay.	11 May 2013
45	The Origin of the Specious	A tourist and his wife delve into Froachy Bay's history at the local museum.	21 May 2013
46	Casino rile	The bank manager foolishly gambles away the town's money at the casino.	25 May 2013
47	The Day the Earth Sat Still	Farmer Lee fakes crop circles to earn extra money.	2 June 2013
48	Whatnot to wear	Calum French is carted away to a World War Two style weight loss camp.	8 June 2013
49	The Terminutter	Peter the inventor creates a robot to clean up the town.	15 June 2013
50	You've Goat to Be Kidding	Writer Stephen Smallberg's brand new script is stolen by a seagull.	22 June 2013

=== Season 5 (2014–2015) ===
#	Title	Summary	Original air date
51	Diary of a Mafia Lobster	Officer Maclean's attempt at treating himself to a lobster dinner goes wrong.	18 October 2014
52	Pie Hard	Pie factory owner Mr Featherby sets up a contest for one lucky person to choose a new flavour of pie.	23 October 2014
53	Warden Peace	The people of Fraochy Bay band together to deal with a troublesome traffic warden.	30 October 2014
54	A weighted question	American fitness fanatic Arnold Logan rocks up to sell his miracle muscle-gain products. But is the promise of 'instant results for non of the work' too good to be true?	2 November 2014
55	Pirate Wars	A ratings war is declared in Fraochy Bay as two pirate radio stations battle it out to win listeners.	9 November 2014
56	Wish You Weren't There	When vandals strike Fraochy Bay, the Provost determines to clean the town up.	16 November 2014
57	Love Letters	The delivery of a long forgotten love letter inadvertently triggers a war in Fraochy Bay.	23 November 2014
58	Time Travel	Peter the inventor travels through time and creates a variety of paradoxes as he goes.	29 November 2014
59	The Sugar Siege	Fraochy Bay's sweet-toothed residents are in for a shock when sugar is outlawed in the town.	6 December 2014
60	Survival Games	Television survival expert Badger Ovens sets about deliberately causing a volcanic eruption in town.	1 March 2015
