= National Literacy Trust =

Independent charity in London, England that promotes literacy

The National Literacy Trust is an independent charity (registered no. 1116260 in England and Wales and registered no. SCO42944 in Scotland) based in London, England, that promotes literacy.

It was founded by Sir Simon Hornby, former chairman of the major national retail chain, WHSmith PLC. Its current Chief Executive is Jonathan Douglas CBE.

The charity campaigns to make literacy a priority for politicians and parents, supports children and families to improve their literacy skills and conducts research on issues relating to literacy. It also works with teachers, literacy professionals and librarians, and establishes literacy projects in disadvantaged communities across the UK. Since 1993, the National Literacy Trust has raised more than £10million from the business sector to support its work, and has directly worked with 2 million children. The National Literacy Trust is based in Vauxhall in the London Borough of Lambeth.

== History of the National Literacy Trust ==
The idea for a charity specifically promoting literacy emerged after Sir Simon Hornby became aware, in his capacity as a trustee for the British Dyslexia Association, of the "highly fragmented approach to literacy in the UK, which had a direct impact on the effectiveness of programmes directed at people with dyslexia at all ages". With encouragement from his fellow trustees, Sir Simon commissioned research from the public relations department of WHSmith into the need for a national literacy agency. After a year of interviews with educational specialists, government officials, and the statutory and voluntary agencies whose work had a literacy component, the study's conclusion was unequivocal: "No agency existed whose specific remit was to promote the issue of literacy, in its many social, political and cultural dimensions, to stimulate new literacy initiatives, and to promote public awareness of the significance of the issue and of practical means to improve literacy standards in all age groups".

Along with Usha Prashar (now Baroness Prashar of Runnymede), Sir Simon worked to establish the core objectives of the new organisation and to secure the voluntary funding necessary for the first years of its operation. Following pledges of core funding from WHSmith PLC, from Pearson PLC and from Book Tokens PLC, Sir Simon pushed for the formal establishment of a new charitable organisation, the National Literacy Trust.

The National Literacy Trust was legally registered as a charity on 19 November 1992 by Sir Simon. Its strategic remit was to "advance public education in Reading, Writing and other literacy skills… and to cooperate and collaborate with voluntary bodies and statutory authorities operating in similar charitable fields and to exchange information and advice". Following an extensive selection process, Neil McClelland was appointed to the role of full-time Director in September 1993, in time for the press launch of the charity in October 1993.

At the end of 2006 Neil McClelland retired from his position as Director and was succeeded by Jonathan Douglas in January 2007. Douglas was previously Head of Policy Development at the Museums, Libraries and Archives Council, where he also worked as Head of Learning and Access. He had also worked as a librarian and in children's services for Westminster Libraries. Douglas is on the Advisory Committee of the Man Booker Prize and the Chair of Governors at his local primary school.

== Campaigning work ==
The National Literacy Trust campaigns to improve public understanding of the vital importance and impact of literacy. The charity is the secretariat of the All-Party Parliamentary Group on Literacy which launched in 2011. As the secretariat, the charity holds meetings and runs commissions that address major policy issues and profile literacy among key policymakers. The National Literacy Trust also convenes the National Literacy Forum, a group of voluntary and community sector organisations who meet twice a year to discuss key literacy policy themes and joint projects.

The National Literacy Trust also runs a number of targeted campaigns in specific local areas, known as National Literacy Trust Hubs. National Literacy Trust Hubs bring together local partners to tackle literacy issues in communities across the UK where low levels of literacy are seriously impacting on people's lives. The charity currently has six active National Literacy Trust Hubs: in Bradford, Peterborough, Middlesbrough, Nottingham, Swindon and Stoke-on-Trent.

They have also partnered with the Department of Education(DfE) and the Labour Government to launch a National Year of Reading.

== Research ==
The National Literacy Trust conducts its own research into literacy attitudes, habits and skills across the UK. The charity runs an annual literacy survey into the attitudes towards reading and writing of eight- to 18-year-olds across the UK, from which most of its research reports are created. In 2017, 47,786 schoolchildren across the UK took part in the survey.

Research produced from the annual literacy survey has examined issues including book ownership and reading outcomes, the link between literacy and life expectancy and reading enjoyment.

== Programme delivery ==
The National Literacy Trust runs a number of projects and networks and works with a range of professionals to deliver support for the development of literacy skills. Working with schools, nurseries, libraries and football clubs, it runs a number of initiatives to motivate and inspire more reluctant readers, as well as a book-gifting programme, the Young Readers Programme, which targets children, young people and their families in disadvantaged areas and has been running since 1997.

Working with the Premier League, the National Literacy Trust has run the Premier League Reading Stars programme since 2003, which gets reluctant readers interested in books and literacy using football as inspiration. Premier League players share their favourite books and deliver online literacy tasks for pupils to complete. The programme now forms part of the Premier League Primary Stars initiative, and the National Literacy Trust also runs a number of other sport-based programmes.
