= Senior Judiciary (Vacancies and Incapacity) (Scotland) Act 2006 =

Act of the Scottish Parliament

- Act of the Scottish Parliament
- Scottish Parliament
- Long title: An Act of the Scottish Parliament to make provision for the exercise of functions during vacancies in the offices of Lord President of the Court of Session and Lord Justice Clerk and the incapacity of the holders of those offices.
- Citation: 2006 asp 9
- Introduced by: Cathy Jamieson, Minister for Justice
- Territorial extent: Scotland

Dates
- Royal assent: 27 June 2006
- Commencement: 27 June 2006
- Repealed: 1 June 2009
Other legislation
Repealed by	Judiciary and Courts (Scotland) Act 2008

Status: Repealed

History of passage through the Parliament

Text of statute as originally enacted

The Senior Judiciary (Vacancies and Incapacity) (Scotland) Act 2006 (asp 9) was an act of the Scottish Parliament passed in response to the incapacity due to ill health of Lord Hamilton, the Lord President of the Court of Session. The bill was introduced on 13 June 2006 by Cathy Jamieson, then Minister for Justice, and received Royal Assent on 27 June 2006.

The act was superseded by the Judiciary and Courts (Scotland) Act 2008 before it could be invoked and it was repealed when the 2008 act came into force on 1 June 2009.

== Background ==
Lord Hamilton was admitted to hospital on 13 May 2006.

== Legislative passage ==
The act was passed as emergency legislation.

== Provision ==
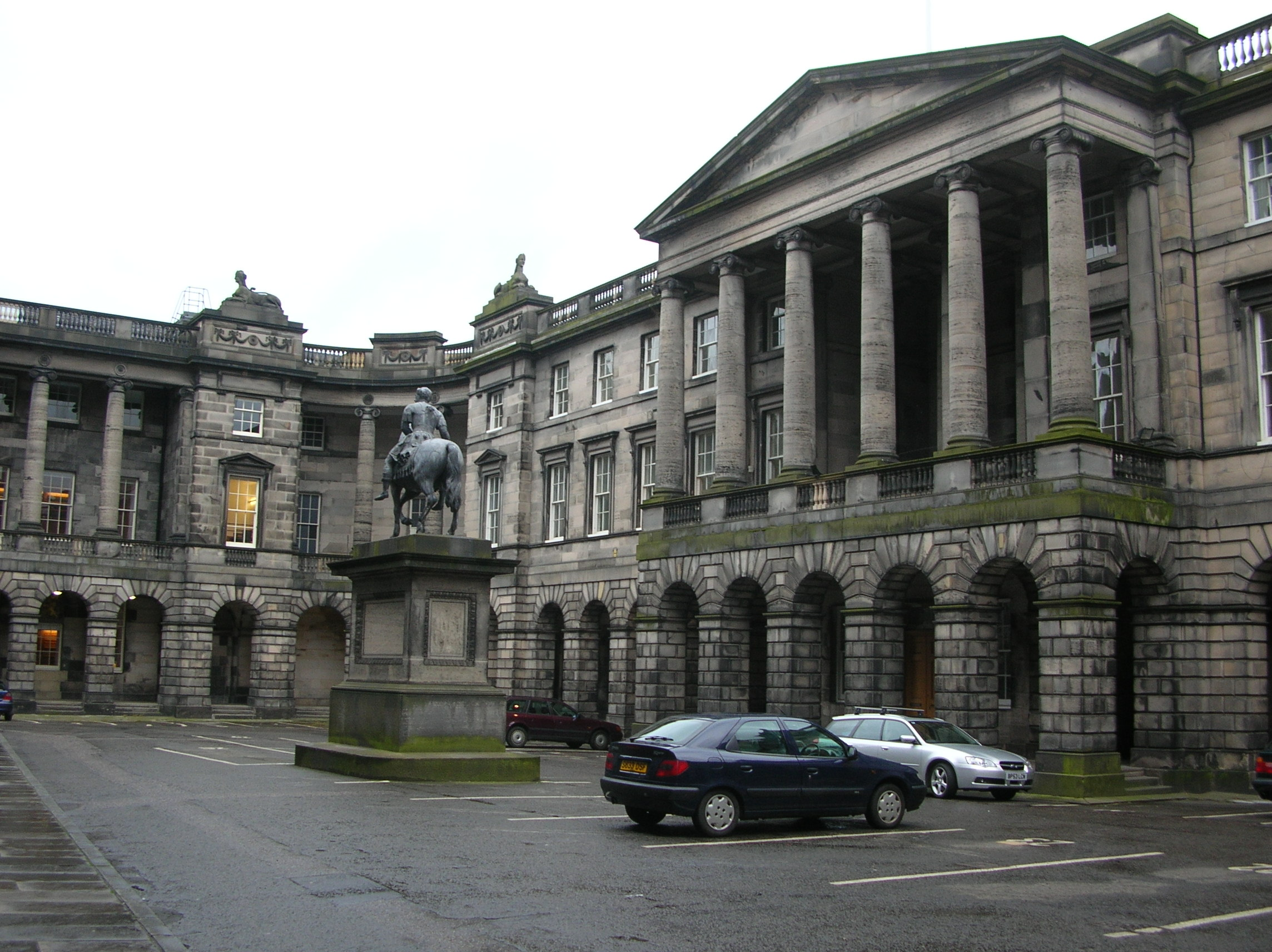
Parliament House, Edinburgh, home of the Court of Session

The act was intended to prevent the business of the Court of Session and High Court of Justiciary being disrupted by the absence of Scotland's two most senior judges (the Lord President and the Lord Justice Clerk). The act provided a system whereby the powers and functions of the Lord President could be passed to the Lord Justice Clerk, or those of the Lord Justice Clerk to the next most senior judge.

If five senior judges in the Inner House of the Court of Session, including the Lord Justice Clerk, certify through a written declaration to the First Minister that the Lord President is incapacitated, the Lord President's duties become exercisable by the Lord Justice Clerk. Similarly, if five judges of the Inner House, including the Lord President, certify in writing to the First Minister that the Lord Justice Clerk is incapacitated, his functions, including any which he has assumed due to the Lord President's incapacity, pass to the next most senior judge of the Inner House. Where both the Lord Justice Clerk and the Lord President are incapacitated, they are not required to certify each other's incapacity.

== Further developments ==
Lord Hamilton returned to work after 2 months of sick leave.

=== Repeal ===
The bill for the act was passed by the Scottish Parliament under emergency procedures, but the return to work of Lord Hamilton meant that it was never invoked. It was repealed by the Judiciary and Courts (Scotland) Act 2008, which was brought into force on 1 June 2009.
