= Death of Ian Morton =

Death of constable

- Died: 26 October 2008; Highcliffe, Dorset, England
- Police career
- Allegiance: United Kingdom
- Department: Dorset Police
- Branch: Criminal Investigations Department
- Service years: 2000–2008
- Rank: Police Constable

Ian James Morton (died 26 October 2008) was an English Detective Constable working for Dorset Police, who died when the Skoda Fabia he was driving crashed into a house in Highcliffe, Dorset on the corner of the A337 Lymington Road and Curzon Way.

During the investigation into his death, Sergeant Neil Salter discovered that Morton had been having an affair, unbeknownst to his wife. In an attempt to protect Morton's family from further distress, he requested a junior officer to destroy a mobile phone that had been located in Morton's vehicle. As a result, Salter faced a misconduct process, where he was ordered to resign. Regarding the decision, Salter's case went to the High Court and the Court of Appeal, with the Court of Appeal judgement being quoted in other misconduct hearings and at employment tribunals, notably in cases of where an officer raises personal mitigation in misconduct cases of operational dishonesty.

== Early life ==
Morton grew up on the Isle of Wight, Hampshire, in the Sandown and Shanklin area. As a teenager, he played football for Lake and Newchurch and was a member of the Sea Scouts.

Morton attended the La Sante Union College in Southampton, Hampshire, where he graduated in 1998 with an honours degree. Until 2008 he lived in New Milton.

== Policing career ==
Morton joined Dorset Police in 2000, realising 'a life-long ambition'. He started his career at Boscombe police station, before moving to Bournemouth police station in 2003. Morton passed his sergeant's exam in 2005, where he was an acting Sergeant at Boscombe police station, joining Bournemouth CID as a Detective Sergeant in January 2007.

== Death ==
=== Accident ===
On the night of Saturday 25 October 2008, Morton had been staying on the Isle of Wight, Hampshire with a Special Constable from another force. Morton was tired from having worked a 10-hour shift on the previous Wednesday, followed by a 15-hour shift on Thursday, before two eight-and-a-half hour shifts on Friday and Saturday.

On the morning of Sunday 26 October 2008, Morton caught the 04:40 GMT ferry from Yarmouth on the island, to Lymington, in order to travel to a 05:30 GMT police briefing at Bournemouth police station, in relation to an armed police operation.

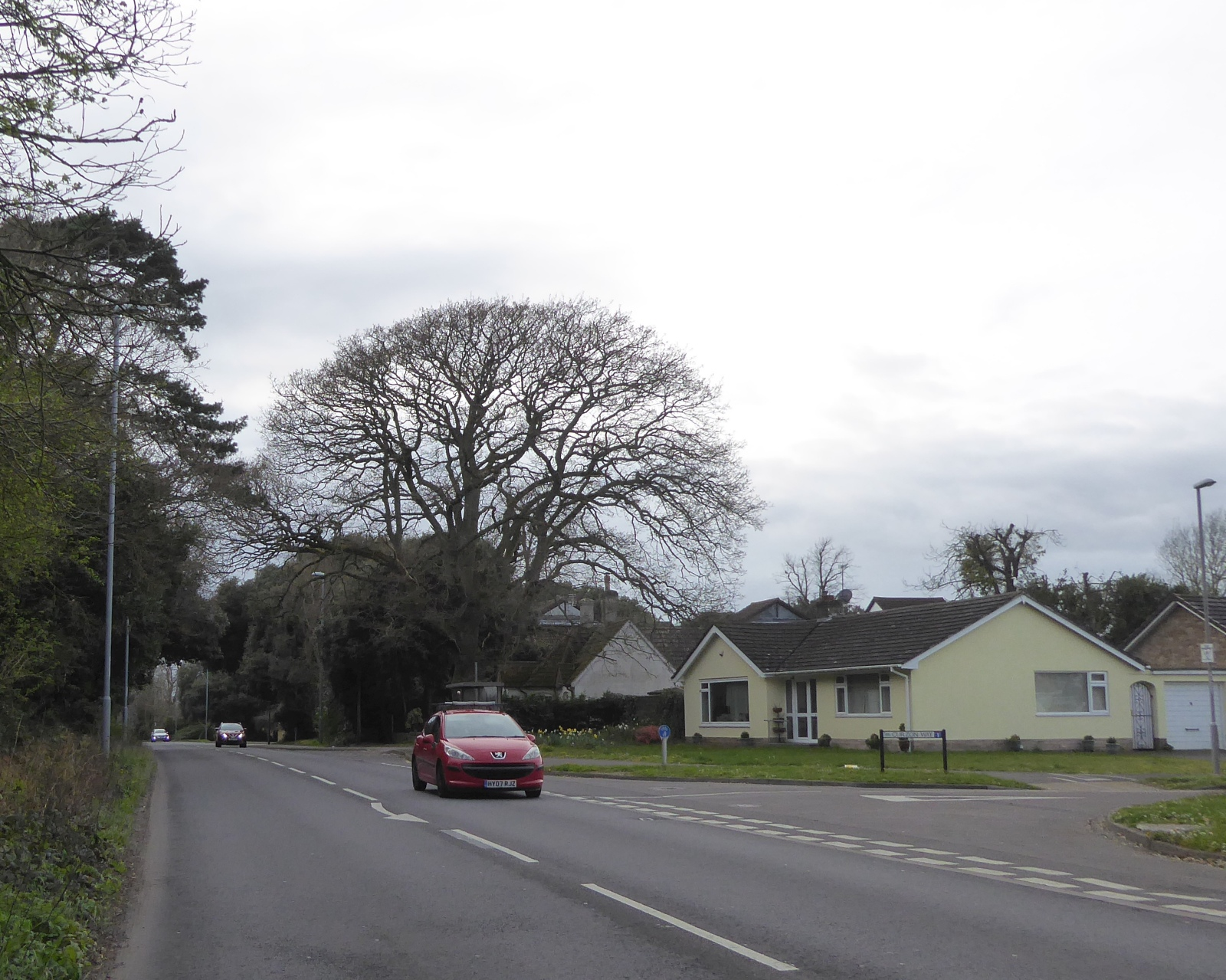
The location of the crash is the yellow bungalow on the right at the junction of Lymington Road and Curzon Way

It was heavily raining that morning and whilst on the A337 Lymington Road, Highcliffe, Morton made a phone call to his supervisor, Detective Sergeant Wayne Seymour, having realised he was running late. A man who was on the road at the time, Vincenzo Capezzuto, spotted Morton's Skoda Fabia speeding along the road and concerned at the speed he was travelling, he motioned for Morton to slow down.

Around a minute after the phone call was made, at approximately 05:40 GMT, Morton crashed into a bungalow belonging to an elderly couple located on the corner of Lymington Road and Curzon Way. Morton died at the scene from multiple injuries, including serious head and other injuries. The road had been reopened by 1pm.

The address that Morton crashed into was the bedroom of 80-year-old Peter Tanswell's, with the crash shifting his bed four feet across the room, causing a wardrobe door to fly over Tanswell. Tanswell was fast asleep when the accident happened, waking up to 'two prolonged bangs' and initially thinking a shelf had fallen down, but saw smoke and what appeared to be a car. In a state of shock, Tanswell called 999. Tanswell suffered minor scratches to his feet and was treated for shock at the scene. The house was caused structural damage, requiring Tanswell to temporarily move out of the address, where every room in the house had to be rebuilt.

=== Investigation ===
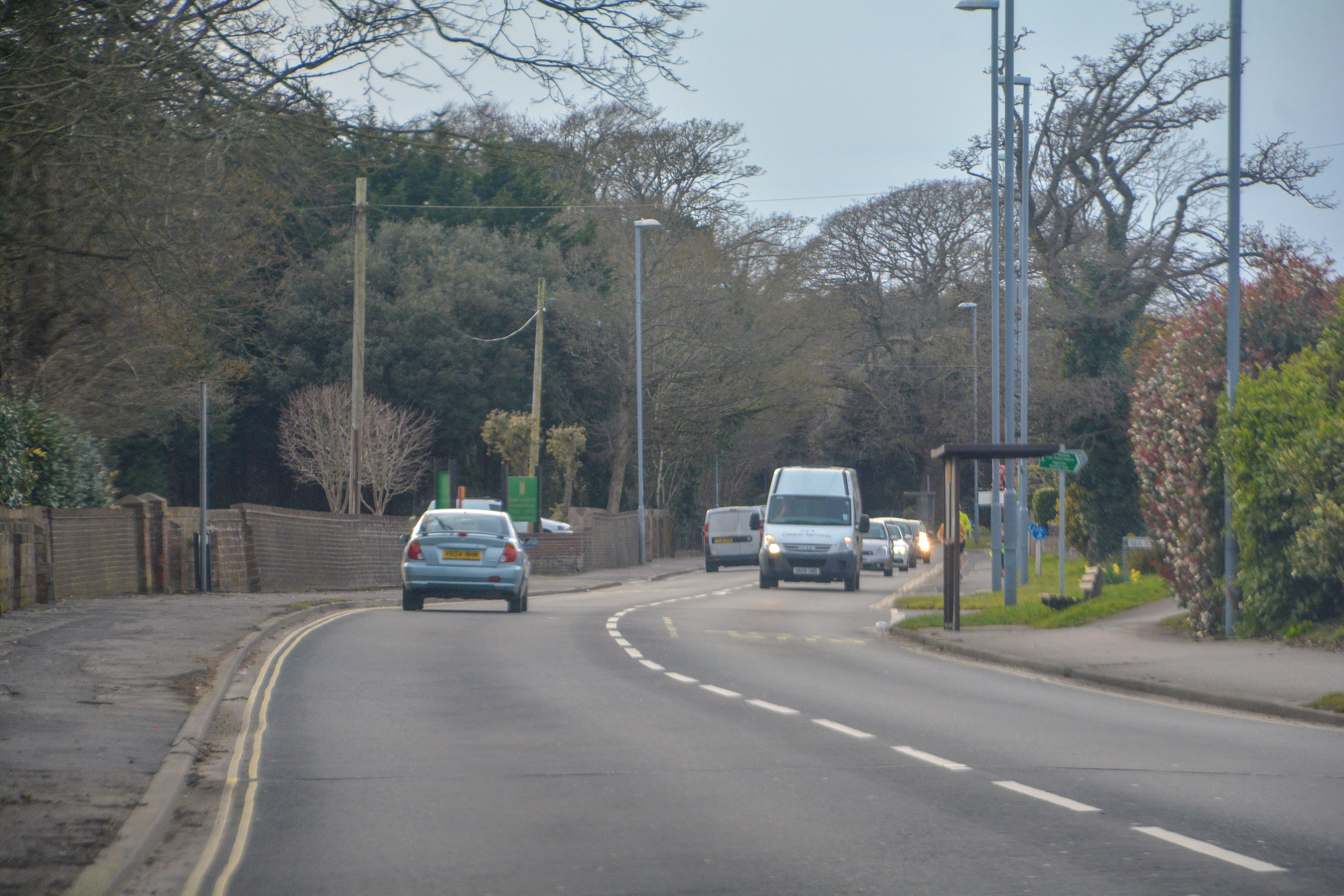
A337 Lymington Road, Highcliffe-on-Sea, near to where the accident happened

Sergeant Neil Salter was appointed as the Deputy Senior Investigating Officer into the accident, with PC Scott Mesher of Dorset Police's Roads Policing Unit being appointed as the Family Liaison Officer and PC Clifton Beard as the accident investigator.

Beard determined that Morton's vehicle had mounted the kerb after failing to negotiate two new traffic islands. From the witness account of Capezzuto, it was determined that Morton had been driving more than 70 mph (112kph), with the road having a 40 mph (64kph) limit.

Dorset Coroner Sherriff Payne concluded that Morton had died as result of the accident, stating: "There is a nagging feeling that he may have been using his phone near the time he lost control. He was the author of his own misfortune."

=== Affair discovered and Salter misconducts himself ===
Salter became aware that Morton, who was married, had been having an affair with a Special Constable in another police force that he had spent the evening before his death with her, whilst his wife was on a night shift in her job as a carer. Morton's wife was unaware that her husband was having an affair.

Within Morton's vehicle, police discovered two mobile phones. Salter discovered that one of the mobile phones had text messages that would uncover the affair. On 27 October, Salter met with Mesher and instructed him to attend the yard that Morton's vehicle had been recovered to, locate the mobile phone and destroy it.

Mesher instead decided to raise Salter's request for him to destroy evidence with senior colleagues, with the matter being reported to the Professional Standards Department. As a result, on 6 November, Salter was arrested and interviewed under caution, where he admitted having told Mesher to 'destroy the phone', however stated he was 'thinking out loud'. Salter stated that he was aware the Coroner would require all the evidence to be provided, but he wanted to protect Morton's family, who could have discovered about the affair. Salter had previously accepted responsibility on 27 October, admitting to colleagues that his decision the phone should be destroyed was his alone, that he knew it was wrong and a bad decision and that Mesher had been right to speak about it.

=== Misconduct process ===
==== Misconduct hearing ====
On 27 August 2009, faced a misconduct hearing, in front of an Assistant Chief Constable and two Superintendents from Dorset Police, where the allegation against him was:

"That your conduct on 27 October 2008 did not meet the appropriate standard as set out in Regulation 3(1), Schedule 1, Paragraph 1 of the Police (Conduct) Regulations 2004 in that as a Police Sergeant with Dorset Police you did not behave with honesty or integrity in relation to the investigation into the death of Detective Constable Ian Morton."

"On 27 October 2008, you were the Deputy Senior Investigating Officer, in relation to the death of Detective Constable Morton. You instructed the appointed Family Liaison Officer, Constable 1845 Scott Mesher to attend the Ibsley Recovery Centre and to locate and destroy the mobile telephone belonging to the deceased officer, even though you knew it would be required as evidence at the Inquest into the officer's death."

Salter admitted to a misconduct panel what he had done, stating he hadn't behaved with honesty or integrity.

Mesher provided a statement that he believed Salter's 'misguided loyalty towards the family of PC Morton' was the reason for why Salter had asked him to destroy the mobile phone and that it was made to 'protect them from further upset'.

Other officers confirmed that on 27 October, Salter had apologies for what he had done and said Mesher was correct to raise concerns to other officers.

Counsel representing Salter contested that rather than Salter being dismissed or required to resign, that the sanction of reduction in rank, from Sergeant to Police Constable, should be chose.

The panel considered their decision for 2½ hours before they concluded he should be required to resign from the force (it was reported that Salter had been 'allowed the dignity of resignation rather than being dismissed' due to an 'unblemished 22-year record of police service'). Their reasoning was that:

"In our judgment your actions amounted to a very serious breach of integrity. You are an officer with 22 years service with significant experience of road traffic collisions and their investigation. You are also an experienced Family Liaison Officer who is used to dealing with families involved in road traffic collisions. In your role as a sergeant you are expected to set high standards to those under your supervision, particularly with regard to honesty and integrity. The Panel accepts that on the balance of probability you made a decision to have the mobile phone belonging to Ian Morton removed and destroyed as you were concerned about the feelings of his family. However, the decision to remove the mobile phone had serious implications in relation to subsequent investigation of the road traffic collision. It is very clear that information that may have been held on the mobile phone could have provided important evidence in relation to the collision and therefore its removal and destruction would have had serious implications in relation to any subsequent judicial proceedings. The Panel also consider that your direction to PC Scott Mesher to remove and destroy the mobile phone is an aggravating factor and could have led to another officer compromising their integrity. PC Mesher took the courageous decision to consult another supervisor which prevented this situation from escalating any further. We acknowledge that when presented with the facts you took responsibility for your actions. We also acknowledge that the mitigation presented to the Panel highlights the fact that you have been a hardworking and competent police officer throughout your service. However, it is our judgment that your behaviour has seriously breached the values of the Force. The public expect the very highest standards of honesty and integrity from police officers. In this case your standard of behaviour has fallen well short and therefore I am requiring you to resign from the Force forthwith."

Salter applied for the decision to be reviewed by the Chief Constable, Martin Baker, with an oral hearing being held on 11 November. However, on 16 November, Baker outlined that agreed with the decision, expressing his conclusions:

29. Those holding the office of Constable, which carries with it not only significant responsibilities but also enormous powers, are expected to have the personal strength of character to make sound judgements under pressure and in the face of ethical dilemma. The behaviour of police officers when they are not under direct supervision or scrutiny is just as important as when they are. Given my own regular contact with the public and Independent Police Complaints Commission in relation to matters of police performance and conduct I cannot accept Mr Wilson's argument that were the public to know the details of this case they would take a view more lenient than that taken by the panel.

30. Mr Salter's application for this Review argued that the decision to require an officer to resign calls for a 'careful and proper analysis of the facts and mitigation in any particular case'. I judge that this is precisely what happened in this particular case.

31. During my Review I have identified no clear errors or inconsistencies in process or determination at the Misconduct Hearing. Neither was I able to conclude that the sanction imposed by the panel was so plainly excessive that it could be properly characterised as unfair. I conclude that the panel took very careful account of all the issues in this case before deciding that Mr Salter should be required to resign. In my view the fact that Mr Salter has been allowed the dignity of resignation rather than being dismissed from the service demonstrates how fully the mitigation, his previous good record and the character evidence has been taken into account. Conversely, any lesser sanction, such as reduction in rank or a financial penalty would, in my view, be wholly inadequate to mark the seriousness of Mr Salter's misconduct. The misconduct admitted is not an issue solely in relation to rank but also to Mr Salter's honesty and integrity as a police officer, which as a result of his own actions has been irreparably damaged.

32. Furthermore I do not believe that Mr Salter could ever again become a good and efficient police officer due to the entire question of an ongoing lack of trust. For example, the nature of Mr Salter's misconduct would mean that he would be able to undertake only a very limited range of police duties because he simply could not be put forward to the Crown Prosecution Service or the courts as a witness of truth.

33. I therefore conclude that the sanction imposed at the Misconduct Hearing on 27 August 2009 ie a requirement to resign from the police service was both justified and appropriate in the circumstances."

Although Baker noted the evidence he had didn't show an apology from Salter, it is accepted that preparation of a statement of an apology had been undertaken at the time when the Chief Constable had stated he'd not received an apology, with the apology not communicated by 'reason of oversight'.

==== Police Appeals Tribunal ====
The Police Appeals Tribunals Rules 1999 outline that an appeal tribunal can 'hear appeals against the findings of internal disciplinary proceedings brought against members of the police force.'

On 9 July 2010, the decision that Salter should have been dismissed was overruled and it was decided that instead, Salter should be reinstated to Dorset Police, albeit in the rank of Police Constable, noting that his actions were 'to avoid further grief to DC Morton's family'. The panel noted that his behaviour during the investigation was a 'one-off aberration':

'The Appellant acted out of concern for others. Laudable as that may seem, he crossed the line into unprofessional conduct which involved a junior officer who, commendably, had the good sense not to carry out the instructions...'

'This was a one-off aberration in an otherwise unblemished career. An officer who has striven for and achieved a measure of excellence should be entitled to feel that he can meaningfully call upon his record in times of trouble. This is the situation here.'

'We consider that the public might well think it somewhat harsh and lacking in compassion for an officer in the Appellant's position and situation to lose his job, with all that that entails, for what he did.'

'We are more than alive – as the Panel and Chief Constable will have been – that the fact that a sanction affects not only the officer concerned but the Dorset Police and the police service generally and the trust and confidence in which they expect to be held by the public. Dismissal is reserved for the most serious cases. A requirement to resign is appropriate for cases which are not the most serious but where the conduct of the officer has shown him or her to be unfit to remain a police officer. We are not persuaded that this is the case here. We are clear, however, that the Appellant should be forthwith relieved of his supervisory role, something he himself has contended for before the Panel, the Chief Constable and in his grounds of appeal before this Tribunal.'

'Accordingly we allow the appeal. We direct that the appellant be forthwith reduced in rank to Police Constable and reinstated in that rank to the Dorset Police.'

— The material parts under the heading of "Decision" of the Police Appeals Tribunal, in relation to Salter's case

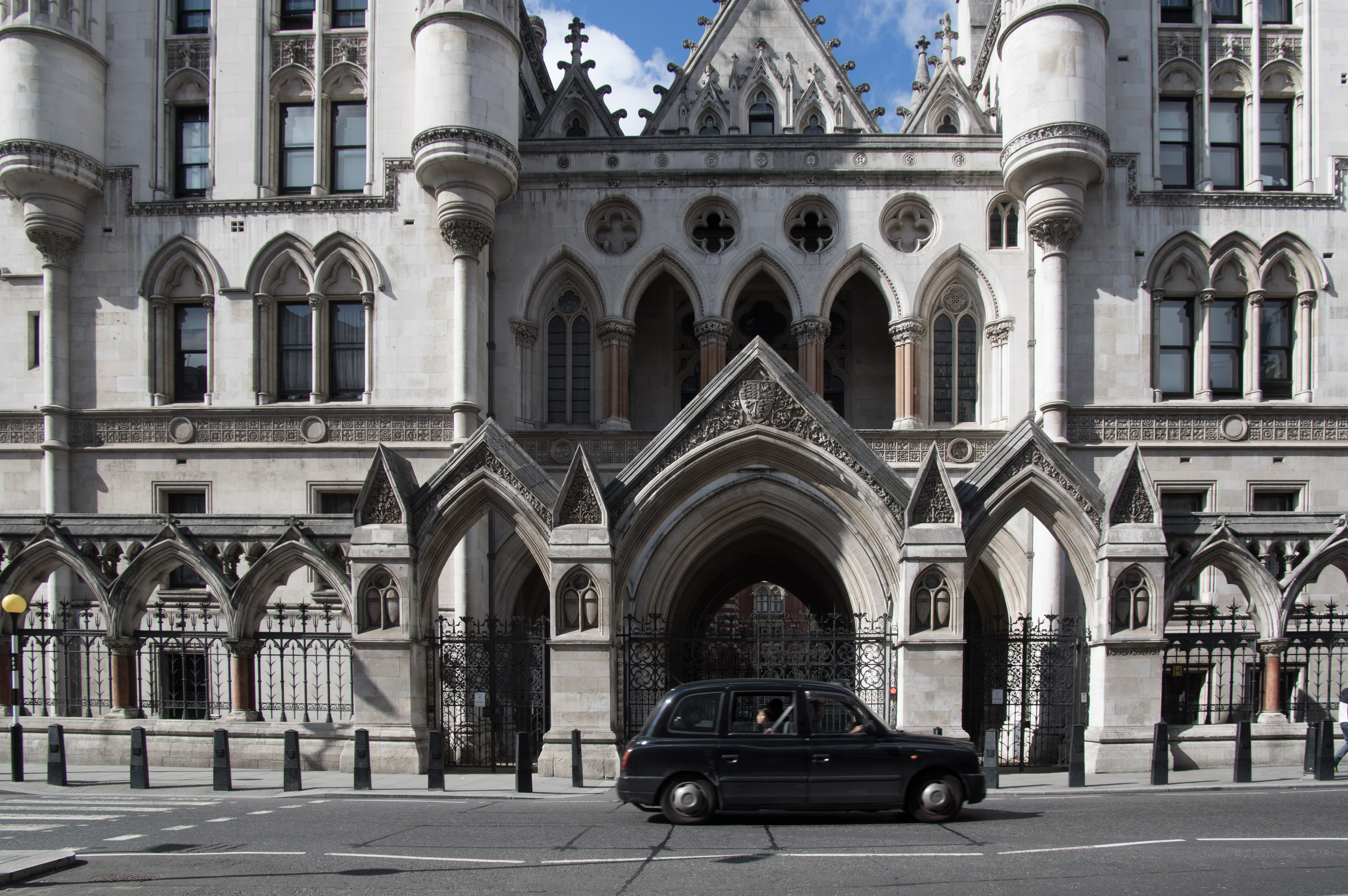
High Court of Justice, London

==== High Court judicial review - [2011] EWHC 3366 (Admin) ====
In 2011, Dorset Police attempted for the decision to be judicially reviewed at the High Court, reported as [2011] EWHC 3366 (Admin). John Beggs QC, who was acting for the Chief Constable, argued how Salter had attempted to 'suborn a junior officer' in what was a 'deliberate and premeditated attempt to destroy evidence' in what was a criminal investigation and how 'operational dishonesty, from a supervising officer of many years standing' couldn't be tolerated within policing, where the values of honesty and integrity have 'paramount importance'. Beggs stated that to allow Salter back to policing could damage the 'trust and confidence' the public had in the police.

On 14 December 2011, Mr. Justice Burnett ruled that the tribunal had 'applied the wrong legal test and given too much weight to Salter's unblemished career and exceptional character'. Mir Justice Burnett quashed the tribunal's decision, ordering that Salter should not have been reinstated, but allowed Salter leave to appeal the decision at the Court of Appeal.

Within his judgement, Mr. Justice Burnett applied the language of Sir Thomas Bingham MR who said in Bolton v Law Society [1994]:

“Any solicitor who is shown to have discharged his professional duties with anything less than complete integrity, probity and trustworthiness must expect severe sanctions to be imposed upon him by the Solicitors’ Disciplinary Tribunal… the most serious (type of case) involves proven dishonesty… in such cases the Tribunal has almost invariably, no matter how strong the mitigation advanced for the solicitor, ordered that he be struck off the Rolls of Solicitors.”

Burnett J found no reason why such principles should not apply with equal force to the police service. Thus he concluded that:

“The reasons which underpin the strict approach applied to solicitors and barristers apply with equal force to police officers. Honesty and integrity in the conduct of police officers in any investigation are fundamental to the proper workings of the criminal justice system. …the public should be able unquestionably to accept the honesty and integrity of a police officer. The damage done by a lack of integrity in connection with the investigation of an alleged offence may be enormous. The guilty may go free. The innocent may be convicted. Large sums of public money may be wasted. Public confidence in the integrity of the criminal justice system may be undermined. The conduct of a few may have a corrosive effect on the reputation of the police service in general.”

The reason for such high standards was “…to maintain public confidence in the police service and maintain its collective reputation”.

[2011] EWHC 3366 (Admin) is the first successful challenge to a Police Appeal Tribunal's decision.

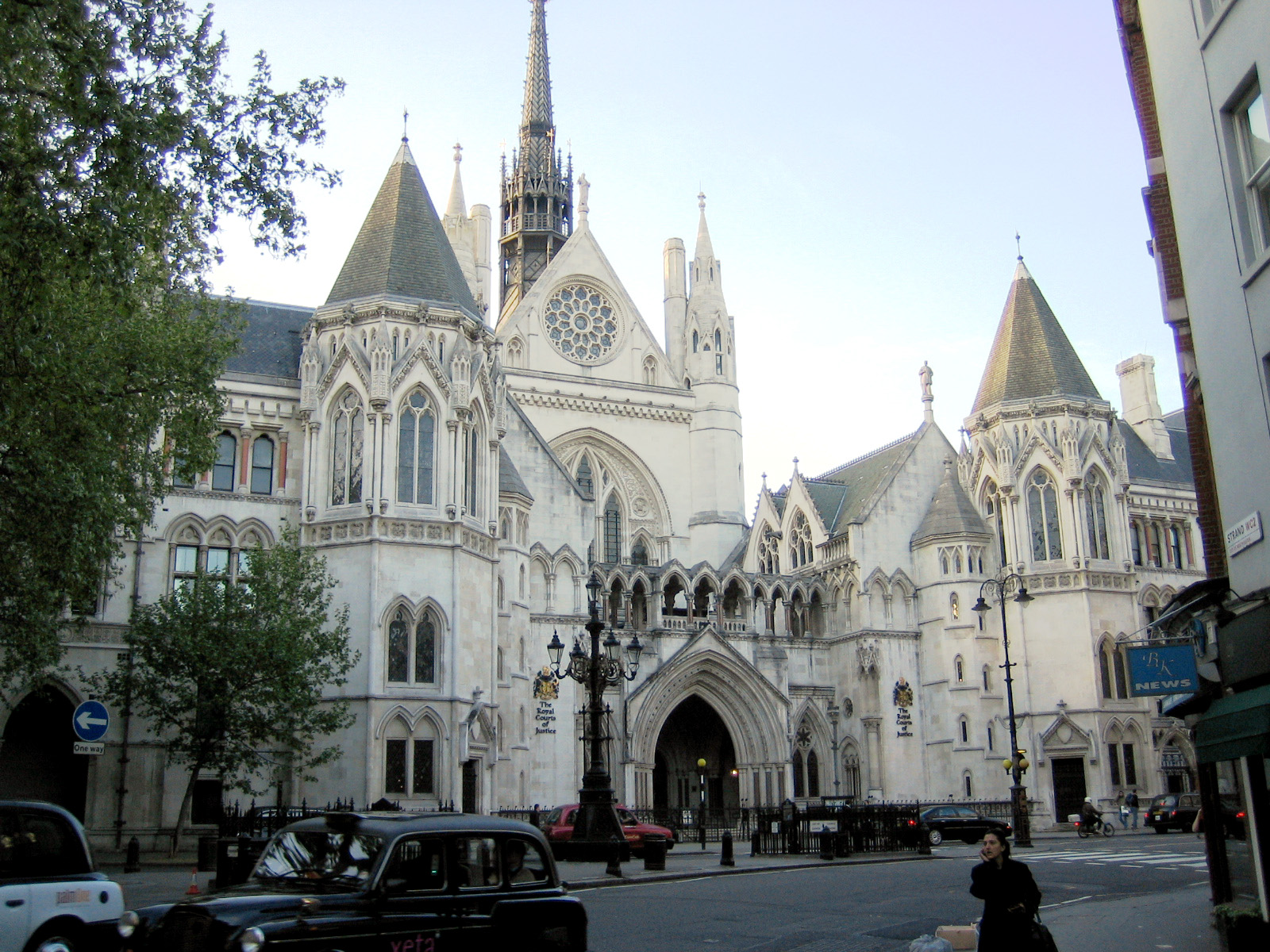
The Court of Appeal (England and Wales) is within the same building as the High Court

==== Court of Appeal review - Salter v Chief Constable of Dorset [2012] EWCA Civ 1047 ====
In 2012, at the Court of Appeal, Salter appealed to challenge the High Court's decision, on five grounds (later these grounds were assessed to have some overlap, and could be summarised with three grounds). These were that:

- What Justice Burnett described as "the correct approach for a decision-maker" in paragraph 30 of his judgment was too prescriptive;
- The judge was wrong to "read across" from the authorities on solicitors' disciplinary proceedings; and
- The decision of the PAT (Police Appeals Tribunal) was not "clearly inappropriate" or "irrational".

However, three senior Lord Justices, Lord Justice Kay, Burnton and Gross rejected his appeal.

On the first ground of appeal, the Court of Appeal found that the tribunal acted in a 'consistent manner and not arbitrarily'. On the second ground of appeal, they found that the judge had 'not been ignorant of the differences between the positions of police officers and solicitors', having 'simply drawn on the authorities in relation to solicitors by way of analogy', with the analogy being justified through 'the similarities between solicitors and police officers in relation to the need for public confidence'. On the final ground of appeal, the tribunal had 'exceeded the limits that were reasonably open to it' and 'notwithstanding the factors that mitigated the offence, including that it had not been planned' and that Salter's motives were 'unselfish and well-intentioned', that 'it still remained a very serious offence'. They noted 'limited' personal mitigation due to the 'importance of public confidence'

They noted as well how 'operational integrity of the police is of fundamental importance'.

== Effect of Salter v Chief Constable of Dorset [2012] EWCA Civ 1047 on future proceedings ==
Salter v Chief Constable of Dorset [2012] EWCA Civ 1047 built on previous cases and principles that involved misconduct and personal mitigation, especially when considering this alongside the misconduct of operational dishonesty.

This was outlined where the judgement stated:

'As to personal mitigation, just as an unexpectedly errant solicitor can usually refer to an unblemished past and the esteem of his colleagues, so will a police officer often be able so to do. However, because of the importance of public confidence, the potential of such mitigation is necessarily limited.'

The Court of Appeal case provided a 'powerful judgement', regarding police misconduct, with one report stating that the case could act as a reminder to police officers and staff how 'dishonesty or lack of integrity in the course of operational duties is professional suicide'.

=== How misconduct or tribunal proceedings should approach operational dishonesty ===
The decision provides guidance as to how tribunal's should determine the sanctions in cases of operational dishonesty, of that the usual outcome will be dismissal, apart from in exceptional cases.

The decision also provides that where a case of operational dishonesty is 'exceptional', where the sanction of dismissal could be avoided, the circumstances that support a lesser sanction should be recorded in full.

The decision provides how an officer's mitigation, namely personal mitigation, provides little relevance (however, mitigation of an issue that provides an explanation as to the circumstances of operational dishonesty may make a case 'exceptional').

=== Other misconduct cases ===
In 2023, the College of Policing released 'Guidance on outcomes in police misconduct proceedings', where Salter's case is outlined to assist those whoa are appointed to conduct misconduct proceedings.

Salter v Chief Constable of Dorset [2012] EWCA Civ 1047 is quoted in other police misconduct cases, including where a claimant has appealed a decision. As well as misconduct cases, the appeal judgement has also been used in employment tribunals involving police, including the mention of personal mitigation.

== See also ==
- Dorset Police
- Police misconduct
