= 2008 Morpeth flood =

Natural disaster in Morpeth, England

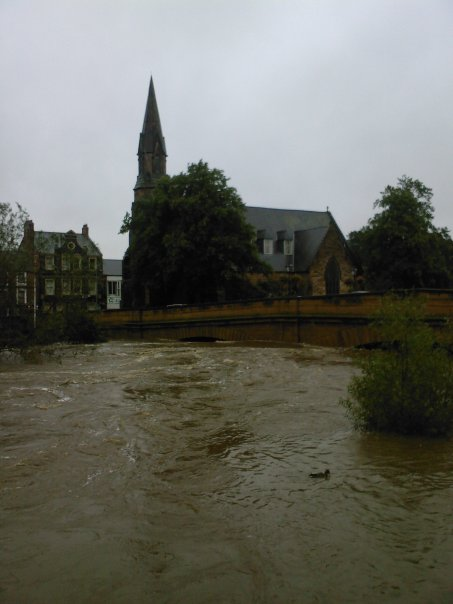
- St George's Church and Telford Bridge at 1332 BST on 6 September 2008.

Meteorological history
- Date: 6 September 2008

Overall effects
- Fatalities: none
- Damage: approx. £40 million
- Areas affected: Morpeth, Northumberland, England

The 2008 Morpeth flood occurred on Saturday 6 September 2008 in Morpeth, a town in Northumberland, northeastern England, when, following sustained heavy rainfall during the previous twenty-four hours, the River Wansbeck burst its banks and overwhelmed the town's flood defences. Nearly one thousand properties, mostly residential, were damaged.

== Background ==
Previous flooding events occurred in 1863, 1876, 1877, 1878, 1881, 1886, 1898, 1900, 1903, 1924, 1963 and 1968 (Cotting Burn).

In 1992, a record peak water level of 3.19 metres (10.5 ft) was recorded in the river channel. The 2008 flood level was 0.8 metres higher than this. However, there was not a flood event in 1992 as the defences successfully protected the town centre.

=== Meteorological history ===
The low pressure "Mattea" formed at the southern tip of Greenland on 3 September, deepening to approximately 980hpa as it passed to the south of Ireland on 5 September. The low then remained in place over the UK before dissipating on 9 September. An occluded front associated with this low moved slowly north across the UK producing flash flooding across the Midlands and the North. The Environment Agency recorded 150 millimetres (5.9 in) of precipitation falling in the Wansbeck catchment area between Friday 5 and Saturday 6 September. Figures suggest that in Morpeth alone there was 86 millimetres (3.4 in) of rain compared to an average of 74 millimetres (2.9 in) for a month.

The River Wansbeck reached a record level of 28.05 metres on the 6th of September 2008 (measured at Oldgate Bridge). The normal range for this site is 24.30-25.70 metres. Flooding in Morpeth is predicted at levels above 26.80 meters.

== Physical causes ==
The River Wansbeck Valley is narrow and steep and as a consequence has exaggerated amounts of surface runoff. Based on three storm events, a reliable flow gauge located upstream of Morpeth at the confluence of the Wansbeck and Font showed that 99.9% of rain fall is converted into surface runoff. Because the soil was already saturated as a result of the wet summer, the effect of surface runoff was greatly enhanced. Furthermore, increased urbanisation since the 1960s in Morpeth meant that most water falling on the town would have drained directly to the river channel. Other tests investigating the catchment lag time (time lapse between the midpoint of storm rainfall and peak river level) indicate that the Wansbeck has a lag time of only 8 hours. This means that any water falling in the catchment area would have been rapidly converted into channel flow by surface runoff and to a lesser extent by throughflow. This is due to the steepness of the valley and the soil composition.

== Effects and responses ==
=== Social ===
During 6 September 2008, more than 400 residents were evacuated. Shelter was provided in the Town Hall, King Edward VI High School and County Hall. An error made by the Environment Agency's warning system meant that 198 properties in the Middle Greens area of the town did not receive a flood warning. Fire fighters, ambulance crews, the RAF, the RNLI and the British Red Cross were among the emergency services involved in rescue and recovery operations over the weekend, as well as some local nurses, GPs, a pharmacist and school staff who volunteered once the news of the flood broke out. They worked through the night tending to those affected. Many residents were forced from their homes, and lived in caravans or with relatives as rebuilding took place.

=== Economic ===
Nearly one thousand properties in Morpeth's town centre were directly affected by the flood water. Among the businesses there, the ironmongers Smails and Sons, a cornerstone of the Morpeth community for over sixty years, was left completely out of stock. Early estimates suggested that damages could be over £40 million. The actual figure was much greater, with total losses estimated at £40 million. On Sunday 7 September, Morpeth Lions Club and the Red Cross launched the Morpeth Flood Disaster Fund, which, by Wednesday 10 September, had raised over £20,000.

=== Environmental ===
At the peak of the flood, Morpeth High Street (Bridge Street) was under 60 centimetres (2.0 ft) of water. Not since 1963 had the main street been flooded. The library suffered severe structural damage due to the heavy debris transported by the river. Such was the extent of the damage that structural engineers were required to test its safety.

== Aftermath ==
High Ford Weir destroyed by the flood (14 September 2008).

On Monday 8 September 2008, John Healey, the Floods Recovery Minister, visited Morpeth. Official government aid was pledged to the local authority to help with costs of the disaster through the Bellwin scheme. Mr Healey was also in talks with insurance industry chiefs, discussing their plans for dealing with a large number of claims in affected areas as quickly and effectively as possible.

Discussions with the Environment Agency to bring forward proposals for new flood defences took place. An Environment Agency report published in December 2007 had suggested that the town's flood walls needed improvement. Oldgate Bridge may need some structural changes made as it has a damming effect during flood events. An upstream reservoir to hold back flood water was also proposed. If successful, improvements could be made by 2011.

Morpeth Lions Club aimed to raise £100,000 for payment to those affected by the flooding without insurance.

The Prince of Wales (now Charles III) and the Duchess of Cornwall made an official visit on Friday 12 September, during which they inspected the damage and spoke with victims of the flood.
