= Supermarionation (band) =

Scottish musical group

- Origin: Edinburgh, Scotland
- Genres: Alternative rock, punk, powerpop
- Years active: 2008–present
- Label: Six Take No Records
- Members: David Curry; Sam Stevenson; Steven Tonge
- Website: www.supermarionation.co.uk

Supermarionation are a three-piece alternative rock band formed in Edinburgh, Scotland in January 2008 by David Curry, Samuel Stevenson and Steven Tonge. Following their live début in Edinburgh in July 2009, their first release, On the Fly, arrived in December 2010 on their own Six Take No Records imprint with a second EP, Amongst the Northern Lochs, following in October 2011.

== History ==
The band were formed when Steven and David, acquaintances from their university days, met up in January 2008 at a James Yorkston gig in Edinburgh with a mutual friend and, feeling they could do better than one of the support acts, decided to form a band with David on drums and Steven on guitar and vocals. Steven then recruited Samuel, with whom he'd studied for a PhD, as a bass player and rehearsals began in March 2008. Initially covering songs by artists such as Neil Young, Ben Kweller and Matthew Sweet, the band played their first gigs over the summer of 2009 and quickly realised they needed to develop some original material.

Song writing duties were taken up by Steven and new material started emerging over the winter of 2009–2010 to critical acclaim. The band then played further shows around Edinburgh and Glasgow through the spring and summer of 2010 including appearances during the Edinburgh Festival. Following this string of well received gigs, the band began working on their first release. The result, a 5-track EP entitled On the Fly, was recorded in Edinburgh at Windmill Sound Recording Studios. On the Fly was released on 6 December 2010 to a small but warm reception and over the succeeding months, it began to gain notice amongst the Scottish indie scene. Following the release, the band played further shows to promote On the Fly including an appearance at The Grassmarket Festival in April 2011. The group also began to broaden their sound by adapting some of their songs to stripped back acoustic arrangements, playing several acoustic gigs and sessions for Leith FM. The group's song Those Home Girls was featured as the lead track on Edinburgh student radio station Fresh Air's charity album The Inside Track, Vol. 2 for Waverley Care released on 2 July 2011. Tracks from the band's radio sessions were to be released as a live EP on Six Take No Records in October 2011 but fell foul of the conditions of Leith FM's radio license from Ofcom and so replacement tracks was rapidly recorded in the band's own studio to fill the already booked launch schedule and Amongst the Northern Lochs was released as a free download on 3 October 2011. Tracks from this EP, The Ballad of Little Beef Cramps and The Paris Express, were featured on Kowalskiy's Free Monthly 5-track Scottish EP No. 16 and the Scottish Fiction October EP respectively through October 2011.

== Critical response ==
Although the band have gained a largely positive response for On the Fly, some critics expressed reservations over both the band's sound and material.

== Discography ==
=== Extended plays ===
- On the Fly (CD and digital download, 6 December 2010, STNR001)
- Amongst the Northern Lochs (Free download, 3 October 2011, STND002)

=== Compilations ===
- The Inside Track, Vol. 2 (Digital download, 22 July 2011) Charity album for Waverley Care featuring Those Home Girls
- Kowalskiy's Free Monthly 5-track Scottish EP No. 16 (Digital download, 16 October 2011) Free EP of unsigned Scottish music featuring The Ballad of Little Beef Cramps
- Scottish Fiction October EP (Digital download, 31 October 2011) Free EP of Scottish music featuring The Paris Express
