= 2007 AS Roma–Manchester United F.C. conflict =

Football riot in Rome, Italy

Manchester United fan hurling a ripped up seat at riot police.

The 2007 AS Roma–Manchester United conflict occurred on 4 April 2007 at the Stadio Olimpico during the 2006–07 UEFA Champions League quarter-final match between Roma and Manchester United. In the conflict, missiles were thrown over a perspex barrier separating the two sets of supporters, which prompted the Italian riot police to enter and attempt to subdue the hostile crowd. The incident has been controversial, as the police and team supporters on both sides view the causes of and reactions to the melee differently.

== Incidents in Rome ==
Before the match began, riot police positioned themselves only on the Manchester United side of the perspex barrier between the fans. After Roma scored their first goal, their fans were allegedly throwing missiles over the barrier into the Manchester United fans. After this, reports claim that a section of Manchester United fans pushed around the Stadio Olimpico ground stewards; as a result of this the riot police moved in to gain control of the United crowd.

The following police action has resulted in Manchester United accusing the Italian police of "hand[ing] out indiscriminate beatings to United supporters" and encouraged witnesses to contact them. Many Manchester United supporters and the Independent Manchester United Supporters Association have also claimed the police response was disproportionate and indiscriminate, and that they had targeted the Manchester United supporters. Eleven Manchester United supporters and two Roma supporters were taken to hospital following the violence. UEFA have launched an investigation and Home Office Minister Vernon Coaker has said that answers were needed into whether or not Italian police had been brutal.

Amnesty International has also backed calls for an inquiry. Achille Serra, head of Rome Police, said the police action was a 'justified response', and said there would be no inquiry unless there were evidence of any alleged police brutality. Italian Football Federation President Giancarlo Abete has also defended the policemen on duty at the ground. Psychologist Clifford Stott attended the match and was critical of the Italian police, adding "One way of looking at it is that the Italian fans use violence against English fans to provoke the police to have a go at them."

Before the match, Manchester United issued warnings to its supporters that they could be attacked, highlighting areas that should be avoided in the city, where hardcore Roma fans, known as ultras, may congregate. This warning was viewed as derogative by some in Rome, including Rome's mayor, Walter Veltroni, who said it was "dangerous because it risks creating a negative climate".

Five people (three English and two Italians) were also injured as they made their way to the stadium.

The Italian Interior Minister Giuliano Amato said that the police inside the ground were excessive in their use of batons on some of the United fans, but has called for people not to judge the entire Italian police force by the actions of those involved in this incident.

The Independent Manchester United Supporters Association (IMUSA) has demanded an apology from the Italian police, has said those fans injured should be compensated, and that they were prepared to take legal action to obtain this. Action was initiated in the Italian courts but when this was timed out a civil case was opened. That action is still live and still awaiting a decision. The fans of both Manchester United and Milan were praised by the Manchester police following their Champions League semi-final match on 24 April 2007.

On 25 April 2007, UEFA released a statement regarding the sentence for both teams. Roma were fined CHF75,000 (€47,700/£31,100) while Manchester United were fined CHF35,500 (€21,300/£14,500). Both teams have three days from the date of receipt of the written grounds for the decision.

== Incidents in Manchester ==
In the return leg, which was played at Manchester United's Old Trafford; police beat Roma fans with batons and brought out police horses and dogs after Roma and United fans had thrown bottles at each other outside of the ground before the game. There were 14 English fans arrested along with seven Italians.

British Sports Minister Richard Caborn was quoted as saying "It's unfortunate that there have been some scuffles outside Old Trafford. This was always going to be a highly-charged game following the incident last week. Greater Manchester Police have used proportionate force in a potentially difficult situation and have handled it well." Reports from police spokespersons said that they were "required to deal with a number of small and isolated incidents" and that the trouble was "contained within five minutes".

== Post-conflict events ==
In the season following the conflicts, Roma were once again set to play Manchester United. Roma club captain Francesco Totti sought to defuse any potential tensions by making a personal video apology to a female United fan, Carly Lyes, who was caught up in the clash between police and United fans.

We would like to apologise for the treatment you received in Rome last season and we hope it has not damaged the opinion you and your fellow supporters have of our city. We would also like to invite you to the Olympic Stadium for the game later this year and treat you as our special guest.

— Francesco Totti, 2007

Totti's message was well received by Lyes, but the fan pointed out that it was the police, Roma officials, and UEFA who should be apologising for the events of that night, not the playing staff.

== Related incidents ==
In the previous round of the competition, Manchester United fans were involved in an incident at the Stade Félix-Bollaert in Lens in February, during a round of 16 match between Lille OSC and Manchester United. As the stadium began to fill, too many United fans were directed to the away stand which could not facilitate them, causing the spectators at the front of the stand to be pressed against the perimeter fencing. Amidst fears of a Hillsborough-like incident, fans attempted to climb over the metal fencing surrounding the away section. Riot police saw the attempts as a pitch invasion and fired tear gas into the crowd, which prompted criticism of their handling of the situation.

In 2006, three Middlesbrough fans were stabbed and 10 others injured during fights with Roma fans in a UEFA Cup quarter-final match.
