= Trusadh =

Scottish Gaelic television news magazine program

Trusadh is a Scottish Gaelic television news magazine programme that has been running since 2008 and that is shown on BBC Alba television. The contents of the programme range from sex reassignment surgery, to wolfdog ownership in the Highlands of Scotland.
