= That Was The Team That Was =

- Narrated by: John Gordon Sinclair
- Country of origin: Scotland

Production
- Producer: Brendan O' Hara
- Running time: 30 minutes

Original release
- Network: BBC One Scotland
- Release: 10 February 2006 – 22 February 2008

That Was The Team That Was is a Scottish television programme that documented successful time periods for Scottish football sides. The show was broadcast on BBC One Scotland every Friday night (when there was a series ongoing). Its title is derived from the 1960s BBC satire That Was the Week That Was. It was produced by Brendan O'Hara of BBC Scotland.

== Format ==
Filmed in a documentary style, the programme is narrated by John Gordon Sinclair and part-written by Chick Young. It involves highlights of matches played by the featured side interspersed with recollections from former players and managers. A scrapbook style format, showing newspaper clippings, is used to cover events for which there are no television highlights, a particular problem in 1985, when a dispute between television companies and the League led to a 6-month football broadcasting hiatus.

== 2006: The First Series ==
The first series, entailing 6 episodes, was broadcast in February and March 2006. The date provided is that on which the episode was first aired.

- 10 February – Scotland 1974: Scotland qualified for their first World Cup since 1958 but, despite remaining unbeaten, were knocked out in the first round on goal difference.
- 17 February – Heart of Midlothian 1985–86: After a 31-game unbeaten run, defeat in their last two fixtures saw Hearts miss out on a League and Scottish Cup double.
- 24 February – Celtic 1987–88: In their centenary year, Celtic gave their supporters fitting reason to celebrate by claiming a League and Cup double.
- 3 March – Rangers 1996–97: The Gers League title victory saw them equal Celtic's cherished long-standing record of 9-in-a-row, in a season in which they also won the League Cup.
- 10 March – Dundee United 1986–87: Competing on 4 fronts, Dundee United played 67 games in a season in which they reached both the UEFA Cup and Scottish Cup finals, only to lose to IFK Gothenburg and St Mirren respectively.
- 17 March – Aberdeen 1982–83: Aberdeen became the third Scottish side to win a European trophy when they defeated Real Madrid 2–1 after extra time in the Cup Winners' Cup final in Gothenburg.

== 2007: The Second Series ==
The second series, again featuring 6 episodes, was broadcast in January, February and March 2007. The date provided is that on which the episode was first aired.

- 27 January – Scotland 1996: Craig Brown's side was the second Scottish team to qualify for the European Championship finals, which were held in neighbouring England in 1996.
- 2 February – Hibernian 1991–92: Hibs were the subject of a hostile takeover bid by rivals Hearts' chairman Wallace Mercer in 1990. From the verge of extinction they recovered to win the League Cup against Dunfermline Athletic just over a year later.
- 9 February – Celtic 1997–98: Celtic won the League for the first time since 1988 under Dutch coach Wim Jansen, in the process stopping major rivals Rangers from setting a new record of 10 League titles in a row.
- 16 February – Raith Rovers 1994–95: Jimmy Nicholl's Kirkcaldy side won their first major honour by defeating Celtic in the League Cup final and also earned promotion to the Premier Division through their league form.
- 23 February – Leeds United 1973–74: Don Revie's league-winning Leeds team were the first English side featured; it contained numerous Scots, including Billy Bremner, Joe Jordan and Eddie Gray.
- 2 March – Rangers 1986–87: In 1986 Graeme Souness was appointed Rangers manager and, aided by transfer spending unprecedented in Scottish football, he led the side to their first League title in 10 years.
