= Brian Gill, Lord Gill =

Scottish judge and legal academic

The Right Honourable Lord Gill
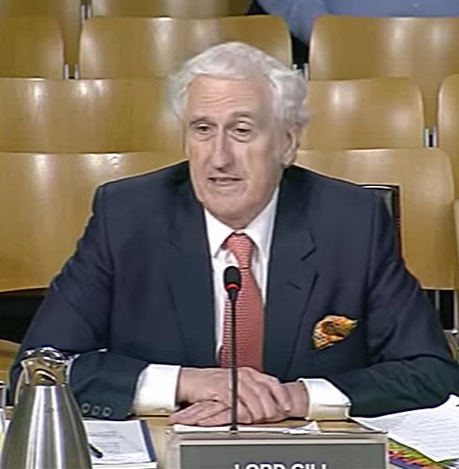
- Gill in 2015

Lord President of the Court of Session Lord Justice General
- In office 8 June 2012 – 31 May 2015
- Appointed by: Elizabeth II
- Deputy: Lord Carloway
- Preceded by: Lord Hamilton
- Succeeded by: Lord Carloway

Lord Justice Clerk
- In office November 2001 – 8 June 2012
- Appointed by: Elizabeth II
- Preceded by: Lord Cullen
- Succeeded by: Lord Carloway

Personal details
- Born: 25 February 1942 (age 84) Glasgow, Scotland
- Spouse: Catherine Fox
- Education: University of Glasgow (M.A. LL.B.); University of Edinburgh (PhD)
- Profession: Advocate

Brian Gill, Lord Gill, PC KSG FRSE FRSCM (born 25 February 1942) is a retired Scottish judge and legal academic. Lord Gill was Lord President and Lord Justice General and held that position for three years from 2012 until 2015. His 2007 to 2009 consultation and report into the failings of the Scottish legal system was followed by a major overhaul of the entire court system once he had been appointed Lord President.

As an advocate, he practised principally in property law, and in particular agricultural law. He was appointed a judge of the Court of Session in 1994 and was Chairman of the Scottish Law Commission from 1996 to 2001. He served as Lord Justice Clerk from 2001 to 2012 prior to his appointment as Lord President.

Between 2015 and 2017 Lord Gill sat on the panel of the Supreme Court of the United Kingdom. Between 2017 and 2020 he served three years as a Judicial Commissioner with the Investigatory Powers Commissioner's Office.

He is the author of several works including Agricultural Tenancies, and is general editor of The Scottish Planning Encyclopedia. He has received multiple honours in connection with the Roman Catholic sphere and music as well as the law.

== Education ==
Gill was born in Riddrie, in northeast Glasgow, and educated at St Aloysius' College, an independent Jesuit school in the city. He studied at the School of Law of the University of Glasgow (M.A., LL.B.), where he was a member of the Glasgow University Union and Dialectic Society, and at Edinburgh where he gained his PhD in 1975 and lectured in the Faculty of Law from 1964 until 1977.

== Career ==
=== As advocate ===
He was admitted to the Faculty of Advocates in 1967 and appointed Queen's Counsel in 1981. He was called to the English Bar (Lincoln's Inn) in 1991. Gill was an Advocate Depute from 1977 to 1979, and standing Junior Counsel to the Foreign and Commonwealth Office (1974–77), the Home Office (1979–81) and the Scottish Education Department (1979–81). He has been a member of the Scottish Legal Aid Board and the Scottish Valuation Advisory Council and Deputy Chairman of the Copyright Tribunal. From 1987 to 1994 he was Keeper of the Advocates' Library and a Trustee of the National Library of Scotland.

=== As Judge ===
==== First instance judge and Chairman of the Scottish Law Commission 1996 - 2001 ====
Gill was appointed a Senator of the College of Justice in 1994, and took the title Lord Gill. He was Chairman of the Scottish Law Commission from 1996 until 2001. In this capacity he was directly responsible for reorganising the production of wide-ranging legal studies and reports, legislative programmes and completion of projects outstanding from before his appointment. These are contained in the Fifth Programme of Law Reform of 25 February 1997 and the Sixth Programme of Law Reform of March 2000. The Fifth Programme declared itself to be "a new programme of law reform, which will consolidate and supersede all previous programmes." The new programme included the setting of anticipated realistic targets for project completion and the institution of a cycle of rolling programmes, reported on and revised at 3-5 year intervals. The Sixth Programme recorded that the aims and projects of the Fifth Programme had been substantially achieved, alongside completion of various non-programme projects intervening. New priorities were for the introduction of timetabling and management planning. Ministerial references were anticipated and were to be given in each case a specific completion date.

==== Lord Justice Clerk 2001 - 2012 ====
Lord Gill was appointed Lord Justice Clerk and President of the Second Division of the Inner House of the Court of Session in November 2001.

In 2005 he applied for the Lord President's position but, controversially, was not appointed. The appointments panel included Lord Hope of Craighead and Sir David Edward. Instead, the panel recommended another candidate, Lord Hamilton, who was duly appointed on 2 December 2005. Within a short time of the appointment, Lord Hamilton was admitted to the Priory Hospital in Glasgow. By 13 June 2006 the Senior Judiciary (Vacancies and Incapacity) (Scotland) Act 2006 was introduced in Bill form so as to enable the Lord President's functions to be passed to the Lord Justice Clerk so that business of the Lord President could be transacted in any further periods of absence. Lord Hamilton's return to work averted an activation of the statutory provisions.

On 11 May 2004 a disastrous explosion at the Stocklines plastics factory in Glasgow occurred. Lord Gill conducted a public inquiry into the accident. He was appointed on 21 January 2008 and reported in July 2009. He was tasked to ascertain the likely causes of the event and to make recommendations to avoid a recurrence elsewhere. He proposed a new safety regime for liquefied petroleum gas (LPG) installations. The Health and Safety Executive duly incorporated these recommendations and findings into the new safety regime consultations.

==== Lord President 2012 - 2015 ====
In June 2012 Lord Gill again applied for the position of Lord President, and was appointed. The nomination to the Queen was made by First Minister Alex Salmond who described him as "of great stature and integrity". He was the first Roman Catholic to be appointed to the position of Lord President. Lord Gill retired in May 2015.

==== The Supreme Court of the United Kingdom 2015 - 2017 ====
Since then he has sat on occasion as an acting judge of the United Kingdom Supreme Court. He retired from service on the UK Supreme Court shortly before his 75th birthday. In his farewell remarks, Lord Neuberger, the then President of the UK Supreme Court, praised Lord Gill's judgments as "models of authority, conciseness and lucidity" and recorded thanks for Lord Gill's "enormous and long-lasting contribution to the development of the law and the rule of law in Scotland and the UK generally."

=== After the Bench ===
Between September 2017 and September 2020 Lord Gill served as a Judicial Commissioner with the Investigatory Powers Commissioner's Office (IPCO) in the exercise of its functions under the Investigatory Powers Act 2016.

== Reforms to the Scottish Courts system ==
=== The Gill Report ===
In February 2007 Cathy Jamieson, Minister for Justice, requested Lord Gill to investigate and report in the widest terms on the provision of civil justice. Other members of the Project Board were Lord McEwan, Sheriff Principal James Taylor (of Glasgow and Strathkelvin) and Sheriff Mhairi Stephen (of Edinburgh). The Consultation document was produced in November 2007 and did not confine itself to civil justice but included observations on criminal justice as well. Between 2007 and 2009, Lord Gill undertook a far-reaching review of the civil courts system in Scotland. The final Report recommended a shift of much of the workload of the Court of Session to Scotland's local sheriff courts including by means of a financial limit of £150,000 before a case could be pursued in the higher courts (the Court of Session). In all 206 proposals were made following an extensive public consultation process. The Scottish Civil Courts Review proposals involved a major overhaul of the courts' administration to be overseen by a single Scottish Civil Justice Council.

The proposals were widely publicised, as was Lord Gill's view that the court system was failing society and could be described as "outdated, expensive, unpredictable and inefficient." The Faculty of Advocates during the consultation "strongly opposed" the suggested changes limiting access to the higher courts. Justice Secretary Kenny MacAskill supported the ensuing recommendations, but Lord President Hamilton was more cautious and emphasised that the judges did not in his view necessarily agree with everything in the report.

=== Reforms as Lord President ===
When in 2012 Lord Gill was appointed Lord President, he was the longest-serving judge in Scotland. First Minister Alex Salmond endorsed Lord Gill's "commitment to reform and modernisation." In 2013 the Scottish Civil Justice Council came into existence, tasked amongst other things with the creation of new court rules. The Courts Reform (Scotland) Act 2014 is the primary relevant legislation. It was passed unanimously by the Scottish Parliament, and was recognised as "an important milestone" to ensure the system was "fit for the 21st century" (Kenny MacAskill). The exclusive jurisdiction of the sheriff court was ultimately fixed at £100,000, and as of 2016 there came into being a single national Edinburgh-based personal injury Sheriff Court. The legislation contemplated appeals from a sheriff to a Sheriff Appeal Court. This latter was a new body created under the reforming legislation. In addition, specialisation was given a statutory basis so that family law, commercial and other specialisms could receive more expert judicial handling. Applications for judicial review (challenging administrative decisions) were to be subjected to a new 3 months time limit. The reforms created a joint administration for courts and tribunals, and reforms not needing legislative change were already underway following Lord Gill's appointment and before the legislation.

== Selected publications ==
Crime of fraud: a comparative study Brian Gill (1975)

The Laws of Scotland: Stair Memorial Encyclopaedia, title The Roman Catholic Church in Scotland Brian Gill, Raymond J Doherty (1991)

Agricultural Holdings Styles Lord Gill, Alasdair G. Fox (1997)

The Reform of Civil Justice Lord Gill (1997)

The Organs of St Columba’s Brian Gill (1998)

The relationship between the Scottish Law Commission and the Scottish Parliament The Hon Lord Gill (2000)

The Scottish Law Commission – its contribution since devolution The Hon Lord Gill (2001)

An Introduction to the Recording of Church Organs Brian Gill (2011)

The Scottish Planning Encyclopedia edited by The Hon Lord Gill, assisted by Malcolm Thomson, QC (5 volumes Looseleaf)

Two Questions in the Law of Leases Lord Gill at 255 – 278 in Essays in Conveyancing and Property Law in Honour of Professor Robert Rennie (editors Frankie McCarthy, James Chalmers, Stephen Bogle) (2015)

Agricultural Tenancies (4th edition) The Rt Hon. Lord Gill (2016) 2 volumes This book in 2017 won an award for excellence from the Comité Européen de Droit Rural/European Council for Rural Law (CEDR).

== Law Library donation ==
In July 2019 Lord Gill donated to the Scottish Land Court his extensive collection of agricultural texts and specialist law reports.

== Roman Catholic honours and service ==
Lord Gill is a Knight of the Pontifical Order of Saint Gregory the Great. The honour was awarded in 2011 by Pope Benedict XVI. He is a Patron and life member of the Latin Mass Society, Honorary President of Una Voce Scotland and a former Counsellor of the International Federation Una Voce.

== Music honours and service ==
Lord Gill was Chairman of the Royal School of Church Music Council 2010 - 2018 and became a Fellow in 2018. He was for thirty years Organist and Choirmaster of St Columba’s Roman Catholic Church. He was Governor and Chairman of the Royal Scottish Academy of Music and Drama of which he is a Fellow, and from which he received an Honorary Doctorate. He is a Fellow of the Guild of Church Musicians. Lord Gill also created several choral compositions specially for performances by the Faculty of Advocates Choir.

== Legal honours ==
Lord Gill was awarded Honorary Degrees by Glasgow University in 1998 (LL.D.), Edinburgh University in 2007, and the University of Abertay, Dundee, in 2008 (LL.D.). He has also been awarded honorary doctorates by the universities of Strathclyde and of St Andrews. His name is displayed in the Hall of the Royal Faculty of Procurators in Glasgow as being an Honorary Member of the Faculty. Lord Gill is a Fellow of the Royal Society of Edinburgh (2004). He is an Elected Life Member of the American Law Institute, and a Fellow of the Society of Writers to the Signet. He is an Honorary Bencher of Lincoln's Inn and of King's Inns, Dublin. The Faculty of Advocates in 2013 commissioned from Mark Roscoe a large oil painted portrait of a group of lawyers and judges presided over by Lord Gill. The portrait was unveiled by Lord Carloway in 2016.

== See also ==
- Courts of Scotland
- Judicial reform
- List of Senators of the College of Justice

Legal offices
Preceded by Lord Cullen	Lord Justice Clerk; 2011–2012	Succeeded by Lord Carloway
Preceded by Lord Cullen	Lord President of the Court of Session and Lord Justice General; 2012–2015	Succeeded by Lord Carloway
