= Arthur Hamilton, Lord Hamilton =

Scottish judge

The Right Honourable Lord Hamilton

Lord President of the Court of Session and Lord Justice General
- In office 2 December 2005 – 8 June 2012
- Nominated by: Jack McConnell; As First Minister
- Appointed by: Elizabeth II of the United Kingdom
- Preceded by: The Lord Cullen of Whitekirk
- Succeeded by: Lord Gill

Personal details
- Born: 10 June 1942 (age 84) Glasgow
- Spouse: Christine
- Education: University of Glasgow, University of Edinburgh

Arthur Campbell Hamilton, Lord Hamilton, PC (born Glasgow, 10 June 1942), is a Scottish judge and served as Lord Justice General and Lord President of the Court of Session from November 2005 until 8 June 2012, succeeding Lord Cullen.

== Early life ==
Arthur Campbell Hamilton was born in Glasgow and attended Glasgow High School, which was then a state grammar school. He studied at the University of Glasgow, Worcester College, Oxford and Edinburgh University, where he gained an LLB in 1967. In June 2003, he was elected an Honorary Fellow of Worcester College, Oxford.

Hamilton was admitted to the Faculty of Advocates in 1968 and appointed Queen's Counsel (QC) in 1982. He was an Advocate Depute, a Scottish prosecutor, from 1982 until 1985, Chairman of the Medical Appeals Tribunals from 1988 to 1992 and President of the Pensions Appeal Tribunal in Scotland from 1992 to 1995. Over several months in 1992 to 1993, he acted as a temporary Sheriff Principal in the sheriffdom of Tayside, Central and Fife, due to the indisposition of the incumbent Sheriff Principal. From 1988 to 1995, he was a Judge of the Courts of Appeal of Jersey and Guernsey; as these are part of the Channel Islands with small populations, it is common for English and Scottish judges to sit on the Bench here, as many notable judges have done.

== The Bench ==
In 1995, Hamilton was appointed a Senator of the College of Justice with the judicial title, Lord Hamilton. Although titled 'Lord', he is not a peer; akin to the honorific title bestowed on the younger sons of dukes and marquesses who are also not peers. Between 1997 and 2000, he was a full-time commercial judge dedicated to commercial business and responsible for oversight of that aspect of Court of Session business. In January 2002, he was appointed as a Judge of the Inner House of the Court of Session where he sat principally on appellate business.

On 24 November 2005, the Scottish Executive announced that he would succeed Lord Cullen as Lord Justice General and Lord President of the Court of Session, upon the latter's appointment to the Appellate Committee of the House of Lords. Lord Hamilton took office on 2 December. As Lord President and Lord Justice General, he was responsible for the supervision of these Courts and for the determination of policy and rules of court procedure. He also made appointments to some tribunals and made recommendations to The Queen for the appointment of Queen's Counsel.

He took full-time sick leave from April 2006, and was admitted to the Priory Hospital in Glasgow. This prompted emergency legislation (the Senior Judiciary (Vacancies and Incapacity) (Scotland) Act 2006) to be passed through the Scottish Parliament in June. He returned to work without the need for the legislation to be invoked.

In 2007, Lord Hamilton clashed publicly with the Lord Advocate, Elish Angiolini, over the collapse of the World's End murders trial. The trial judge, Lord Clarke, had ruled there was insufficient evidence for the jury to convict and threw the case out. The Lord Advocate, who is the senior Law Officer in Scotland, had made a statement to the Scottish Parliament, saying she was "disappointed" at this decision. However Lord Hamilton said her intervention had undermined the independence of the judiciary.

== Personal life ==
Lord Hamilton married Christine Anne Croll in 1970, with whom he has one daughter. His interests include hill walking, music and history.

Legal offices
Preceded by The Lord Cullen of Whitekirk	Lord Justice General and Lord President of the Court of Session; 2005–2012	Succeeded by Brian Gill, Lord Gill
