= 2002 in the United Kingdom =

Events from the year 2002 in the United Kingdom. This year was the Golden Jubilee of Queen Elizabeth II.

== Incumbents ==
- Monarch – Elizabeth II
- Prime Minister – Tony Blair (Labour)

== Events ==
=== January ===
- 1 January – Ford unveils their all-new Fiesta supermini which is due on sale in March, but the new model will not be produced in Dagenham, instead, it will be produced in Ford's other European plants in Germany and Spain.
- 7 January – It is announced that a record of 2,450,000 new cars were sold during 2001, breaking the previous record set in 1989. The Ford Focus was Britain's best-selling car for the third year in a row.
- 14 January – The foot and mouth crisis is declared over after eleven months.
- 25 January – Detectives investigating the murder of an unknown boy, called "Adam", whose torso was found in the Thames last year, announce that he may have been the victim of a so-called muti ritual killing.

=== February ===
- 8–24 February – Great Britain competes at the Winter Olympics in Salt Lake City, Utah, United States, and wins 1 gold and 1 bronze medal.
- 9 February – Princess Margaret, the Queen's younger sister, dies after suffering a stroke aged 71.
- 14 February – 2002 Ogmore by-election: The Labour Party candidate Huw Irranca-Davies holds the seat held by Sir Ray Powell until his death
- 15 February – The funeral of Princess Margaret takes place at St. George's Chapel, Windsor.
- 18 February – Constitutional law case of Thoburn v Sunderland City Council decided in the High Court, regarding the use of metric units in retail.
- 19 February – Ford ends 90 years of British car production with the loss of more than 2,000 jobs after the last Fiesta was made at their factory in Dagenham, ahead of the launch of a new generation model in the Spring. However, the plant will be retained for the production of engines and gearboxes and Ford will continue to make commercial vehicles at their plant in Southampton.
- 20 February – Andrew Aston, a 29-year-old Birmingham cocaine addict, is sentenced to 26 concurrent terms of Life imprisonment – officially the longest prison sentence imposed on any criminal in England and Wales – for murdering two elderly people in robberies and attacking 24 others.
- 21 February – The much-admired television actor John Thaw dies suddenly from cancer aged 60 at his home in Luckington, Wiltshire, less than two years after his final appearance as Inspector Morse.
- 27 February – Ryanair Flight 296 catches fire at London Stansted Airport.
- 28 February – Nocton rail crash. Van driver John Fletcher, 47, crashes his vehicle through a wall and ends up on the railway line at Nocton, Lincolnshire; he contacts the emergency services when a passenger train hits the wrecked van. Fletcher is killed and 14 people on the train are injured.

=== March ===
- March – Vauxhall unveils a new generation of its Vectra family car which is due on sale in the Summer.
- 1 March – Singer Doreen Waddell dies aged 36 after fleeing a supermarket in Shoreham-by-Sea before being struck down and killed by three vehicles.
- 2 March – The animated series of Mr. Bean premieres on ITV1. It is based on Rowan Atkinson's Mr. Bean.
- 11 March – BBC 6 Music, the first new BBC Radio station in decades, is launched.
- 21 March – 13-year-old Amanda "Milly" Dowler goes missing on her way home from school in Surrey. Soon afterwards, the News of the World hacks her phone.
- 22 March – A woman known as "Miss B", who was left quadriplegic last year as a result of a burst blood vessel in her neck, is granted the right to die by the High Court.
- 29 March – Coal mining in Scotland which has a history stretching back more than 800 years, comes to an end with the closure of Longannet coal mine in Fife after it floods and the owners go into liquidation, putting more than 500 people out of work.
- 30 March – Queen Elizabeth The Queen Mother dies aged 101 at Royal Lodge, Windsor.

=== April ===
- April – Nursing and Midwifery Council takes over the registration function for nurses.
- 4 April – Queen Elizabeth The Queen Mother's funeral procession in London from the Chapel Royal at St James's Palace to Westminster Hall to lie in state.
- 9 April – The funeral of Queen Elizabeth The Queen Mother takes place at Westminster Abbey, London. She is buried beside her husband and daughter at St George's Chapel, Windsor Castle.
- 23 April – A badly decomposed female body is found in the River Thames; it is feared to be that of Milly Dowler.
- 24 April – The body found in the River Thames is identified as that of 73-year-old Mrs. Maisie Thomas, who was last seen alive near her home in Shepperton just over a year ago and whose death is not believed to be suspicious.
- 25 April – Two 16-year-old twin brothers are cleared of murdering 10-year-old Damilola Taylor, who was stabbed to death in South London 17 months earlier.
- 29 April – As part of her Golden Jubilee celebrations, the Queen dines at 10 Downing Street with the five living former prime ministers who have served under her: Tony Blair, John Major, Margaret Thatcher, James Callaghan and Edward Heath. She is also joined by several relatives of deceased former Prime Ministers, including Clarissa Eden, widow of Prime Minister Anthony Eden.

=== May ===
- 1 May – Airdrieonians, of the Scottish Football League Division One, go into liquidation with debts of £3,000,000. They are the first Scottish senior side to go out of business for 35 years.
- 4 May – Arsenal win the FA Cup with a 2–0 win over London rivals Chelsea in the cup final.
- 8 May – Arsenal win their second double in five seasons (and the third in their history) after a 1–0 away win over defending champions Manchester United.
- 10 May
  - Potters Bar rail crash in Hertfordshire kills seven people.
  - £5million-rated striker Marlon King, of Gillingham F.C., is jailed for 18 months after being found guilty of handling a stolen car worth £32,000.
- 24 May – Falkirk Wheel boat lift opens in Scotland, also marking the reopening of the Union Canal for leisure traffic.
- 27 May – Former leader of the Liberal Democrats Paddy Ashdown appointed as the international community's High Representative for Bosnia and Herzegovina.
- 28 May – Stephen Byers resigns as Secretary of State for Transport.

=== June ===
- 2 June – The England national football team's World Cup campaign, hosted jointly by Japan and South Korea, begins with a 1–1 draw against Sweden.
- 3 June – The "Party in the Palace" takes place at Buckingham Palace, London for The Queen's Golden Jubilee celebrations.
- 4 June – The Queen and The Duke of Edinburgh ride in the gold state coach from Buckingham Palace to St Paul's Cathedral for a special service marking the Queen's 50 years on the throne. In New York City, the Empire State Building is lit purple in her honour.
- 7 June – England beat Argentina 1–0 in their second World Cup group game, with the only goal of the game being scored by captain David Beckham.
- 10 June – The first direct electronic communication experiment between the nervous systems of two humans is carried out by Kevin Warwick in the University of Reading.
- 12 June – England qualify for the knockout stages of the World Cup despite only managing a goalless draw against Nigeria.
- 15 June – England beat Denmark 3–0 in the World Cup second round and reach the quarter-finals for the first time since 1990. Ironically, the far-right British National Party had declared their support for all-white Denmark before the World Cup due to the England team featuring black players.
- 21 June – England's hopes of winning the World Cup are ended by a 2–1 defeat to Brazil in the quarter-finals.
- 25 June – Jason Gifford (27) is shot dead by armed police in Aylesbury after brandishing a shotgun and a machete in a residential street.
- 27 June – The Who's bass guitarist, John Entwistle, dies of a heart attack in Paradise, Nevada, aged 57.

=== July ===
- July – London City Hall is opened on the south bank of the River Thames, designed by Norman Foster.
- 1 July – Rochdale Canal, crossing the Pennines, reopened throughout for leisure traffic.
- 3 July – Decapitation of a statue of Margaret Thatcher: a man decapitates a statue of the former Prime Minister Margaret Thatcher on display at the Guildhall Art Gallery in London.
- 5 July – The Imperial War Museum North in Manchester, designed by Daniel Libeskind, opens.
- 8 July – John Taylor, a 46-year-old postman from Bramley in Leeds, is sentenced to life imprisonment for the murder of 16-year-old Leanne Tiernan. Leanne was last seen alive in Leeds City Centre on 26 November 2000 and her body was found in the Yorkshire countryside nine months later. Police believed that Taylor may have been responsible for other unsolved sex attacks and murders in the Yorkshire area, and the trial judge has warned Taylor to expect to spend the rest of his life in prison.
- 9 July – Clydebank F.C. of the Scottish Football League Second Division become defunct after a takeover by the owners of the new Airdrie United club, who take their place in the Scottish league and continue the tradition of senior football in the town of Airdrie following the recent demise of Airdrieonians, whose stadium they will play at.
- 10 July – The funeral of John Entwistle is held at St Edward's Church in Stow-on-the-Wold.
- 12 July – Ribble Link waterway opened for leisure traffic.
- 13 July – Baltic Centre for Contemporary Art opens in the converted Baltic Flour Mill at Gateshead.
- 22 July – Rio Ferdinand becomes the most expensive player in English football when he completes his £29,100,000 transfer from Leeds United to Manchester United.
- 23 July
  - Rowan Williams, Archbishop of Wales, is elected to be the successor of George Carey as Archbishop of Canterbury.
  - Leicester City F.C. move into their new 32,000-seat Walker's Stadium, named under a sponsorship deal with Walker's Crisps, after 111 years at Filbert Street. It is officially opened by former England striker Gary Lineker, who was born locally and started his playing career with the club.
- 25 July – The Commonwealth Games, hosted by Manchester, are opened by The Queen. The event also marks the opening of the City of Manchester Stadium, which will host the games. It will be partly remodelled after the games are over to become home of Manchester City F.C. from August 2003.
- 30 July – Heavy rain overnight results in floods in Glasgow.

=== August ===
- 2 August – 2002 Barrow-in-Furness legionellosis outbreak: First fatality in an outbreak of Legionnaires' disease in Barrow-in-Furness which results in seven deaths and 172 cases throughout the month, ranking it as the worst in the UK's history and fifth-worst worldwide.
- 4 August – 10-year-old girls Holly Wells and Jessica Chapman go missing in Soham, Cambridgeshire.
- 5 August – Police and volunteers in the Soham area begin the search for Holly Wells and Jessica Chapman.
- 7 August – Police investigating the case of the two missing Soham girls seize a white van in nearby Wentworth and admit they are now looking at the case as a possible abduction.
- 12 August – A possible sighting of Holly Wells and Jessica Chapman is reported by a local taxi driver who claims to have seen the driver of a green car struggling with two children and driving recklessly along the A142 into Newmarket on the evening the girls went missing.
- 13 August – Two mounds of disturbed earth are found at Warren Hill, near Newmarket, in the same area where screams were reported on the night that Holly Wells and Jessica Chapman went missing. It is initially feared that the mounds of earth were the graves of the two girls, but a police examination fails to uncover any link to the girls.
- 16 August – Ian Huntley, caretaker of Soham Village College, and his girlfriend, Maxine Carr, are questioned in connection with the disappearance of Holly Wells and Jessica Chapman, but are released after seven hours in custody.
- 17 August – Following the recovery of items of major interest to the police investigation, Ian Huntley and Maxine Carr are arrested again on suspicion of murder, as police admit for the first time that they fear the missing girls are now dead. Several hours later, two "severely decomposed and partially skeletonised" bodies are found in the Lakenheath area; they have not been identified but police say that they are likely to be those of the two missing girls.
- 21 August – Ian Huntley, detained under the Mental Health Act, is charged with the murders of Holly Wells and Jessica Chapman, whereas Maxine Carr is charged with perverting the course of justice. Both are remanded in custody. Meanwhile, police confirm that the two bodies found at Lakenheath are those of the two girls.

=== September ===
- 4 September – A memorial service is held for actor John Thaw at St Martin-in-the-Fields in London.
- 20 September – Police confirm that human remains found in woodland in north Hampshire are those of Milly Dowler, who went missing in Surrey six months ago. A murder investigation is launched. The perpetrator, who subsequently murders three young women, is convicted in 2011
- 22 September – An earthquake in Dudley is felt throughout England and Wales.

=== October ===
- 1 October – The main provisions of National Health Service Reform and Health Care Professions Act (of 25 June) come into force in England, including renaming and merger of existing NHS regional health authorities to form 28 new strategic health authorities, and introduction of primary care trusts to be responsible for the supervision of family health care functions.
- 9 October – A judge decides that Ian Huntley is fit to face prosecution for the Soham Murders.
- 14 October – The Northern Ireland Assembly is suspended following allegations of spying in "Stormontgate".
- 23 October – Estelle Morris resigns as Secretary of State for Education, explaining that she did not feel up to the job.
- 25 October – Memorial service held at St Paul's Cathedral for the victims of the Bali bombing, which killed 26 British nationals.

=== November ===
- 1 November – Diana, Princess of Wales' former butler, Paul Burrell, is cleared of stealing from the late princess' estate after it was revealed that he had told The Queen that he was keeping some of her possessions.
- 3 November – Singer-songwriter Lonnie Donegan, 71, known as the "King of Skiffle", dies of heart failure during a tour at Market Rasen, Lincolnshire.
- 13 November – 2002–2003 United Kingdom firefighter dispute begins.
- 15 November – Moors murderer Myra Hindley dies in West Suffolk Hospital at the age of 60 after being hospitalised with a heart attack. She was in the 37th year of her life sentence and had spent the last decade attempting to gain parole, having been told by no less than four Home Secretaries that she would have to spend the rest of her life in prison, having previously increased her minimum term from 25 to 30 years during the 1980s, and then to a whole life tariff in 1990. Media sources report that the Home Office will soon be stripped of its power to set minimum terms for life sentence prisoners, and Hindley had been widely expected to gain parole in the near future as a result.
- 20 November
  - German anatomist Gunther von Hagens conducts a public autopsy in a London theatre, the first in Britain in more than 170 years.
  - 40 years after the first James Bond film was made, the twentieth film is released in British cinemas as Pierce Brosnan bows out as Bond in Die Another Day after four films in seven years.
- 23 November – The Miss World beauty competition is held in London after rioting in the Nigerian capital Lagos prevented it from being hosted there.
- 24 November – Home Secretary David Blunkett rules that four convicted child murderers should spend at least 50 years in prison before being considered for parole. This ruling means that Roy Whiting, Howard Hughes, Timothy Morss and Brett Tyler are likely to remain behind bars until at least the ages of 92, 80, 79 and 81 respectively.
- 26 November – Politicians in England and Wales lose their power to set minimum terms on life sentence prisoners after the European Court of Human Rights and the High Court both rule in favour of a legal challenge by convicted double murderer Anthony Anderson. Anderson had been sentenced to life imprisonment in 1988 and the trial judge recommended that he should serve a minimum of 15 years before being considered for parole, but the Home Secretary later decided on a 20-year minimum term.
- 30 November – Girl band Girls Aloud are formed from the five female contestants who win the ITV talent show Popstars: The Rivals.

=== December ===
- 10 December
  - Sydney Brenner and John E. Sulston win the Nobel Prize in Physiology or Medicine jointly with H. Robert Horvitz "for their discoveries concerning 'genetic regulation of organ development and programmed cell death'".
  - Cherie Blair apologises for the embarrassment she caused in buying flats with the help of convicted fraudster Peter Foster.
- 12 December – The latest MORI poll puts Labour four points ahead of the Conservatives on 37%, while the Liberal Democrats are enjoying a new boost in popularity with a 24% approval rating.
- 15 December – On the Record, the BBC's flagship political programme, finishes after fourteen years on air.
- 19 December
  - Shaied Nazir, Ahmed Ali Awan and Sarfraz Ali all convicted of the racist murder of Ross Parker in Peterborough.
  - Stuart Campbell, a 44-year-old builder from Grays in Essex, is found guilty of murdering his 15-year-old niece Danielle Jones 18 months ago. Danielle's body has never been found. It is then revealed that Campbell, who is sentenced to life imprisonment, has a string of previous convictions including keeping an underage girl at his home without lawful authority in 1989.
- 22 December – Sound of the Underground, Girls Aloud's debut single, is the UK's Christmas number one.

=== Undated ===
- Appz Magazine is founded.
- BedZED (Beddington Zero Energy Development), the country's first large-scale zero energy housing development, of 99 homes in Beddington, London, designed by Bill Dunster, is completed.
- The mobile network BT Cellnet changes its name to O2.
- Over 50% of the UK population (well over 30,000,000 people) now have internet access.
- Car sales in Britain reach a record level for the second year running, now exceeding 2,500,000 for the first time ever. The Ford Focus is Britain's best-selling car for the fourth year in a row with more than 150,000 sold and Ford retains its lead of the manufacturers for British sales which it has held since 1975. They have a total of four model ranges among Britain's top 10 selling cars for the first time since 1989. Vauxhall, Peugeot, Renault and Volkswagen also enjoy strong sales.
- Moneyhelpline price comparison service company is founded in Kent.
- The red-billed chough breeds on the coast of Cornwall for the first time since 1947.
- Nip & Tuck, a DJ and producer collaboration, release their first dance production.
- Thornton's Bookshop closes, Oxford's oldest bookshop.

== Publications ==
- Iain Banks' novel Dead Air.
- Terry Pratchett's Discworld novels Night Watch which wins the Prometheus Award.
- Ben Schott's compendium Schott's Original Miscellany.

== Births ==
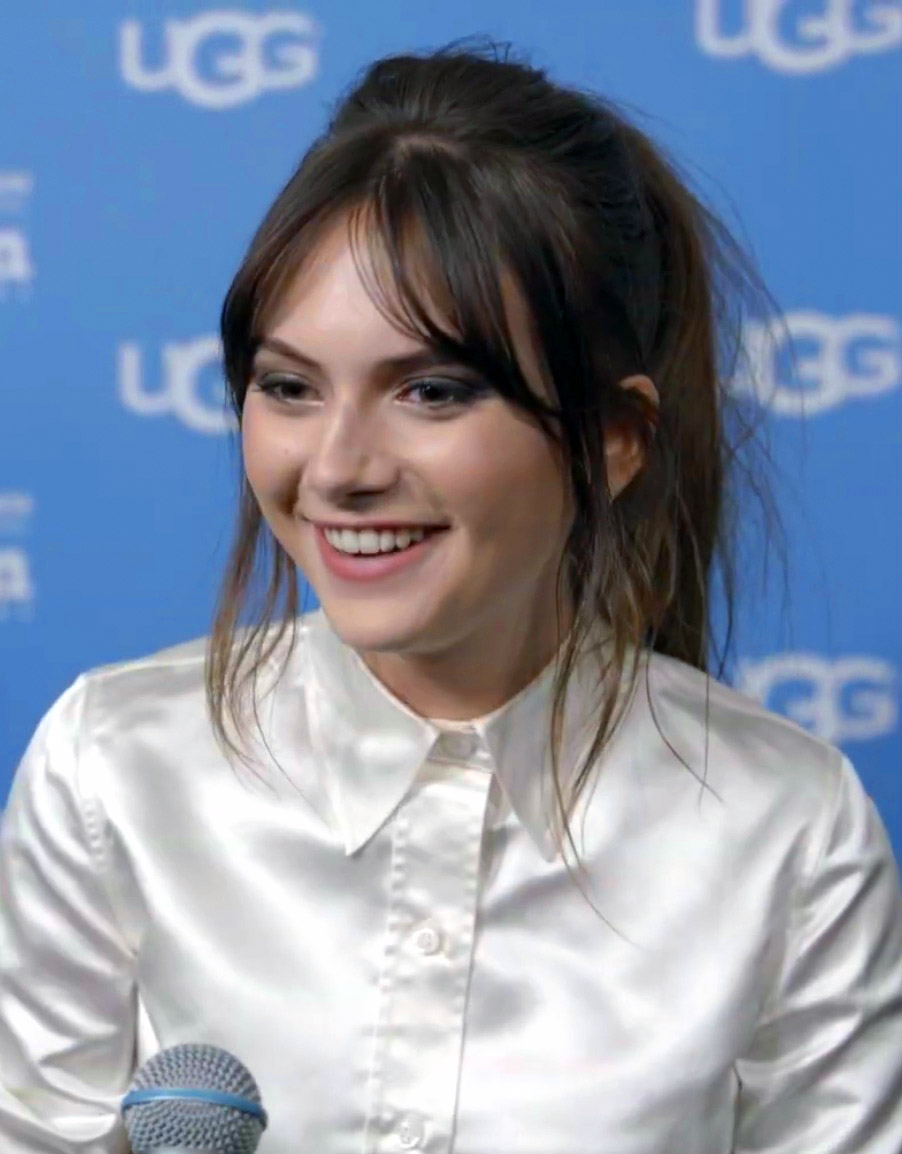
Emilia Jones

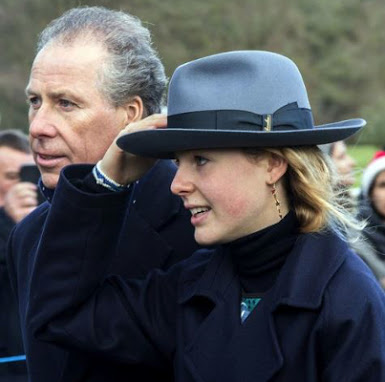
Margarita Armstrong-Jones

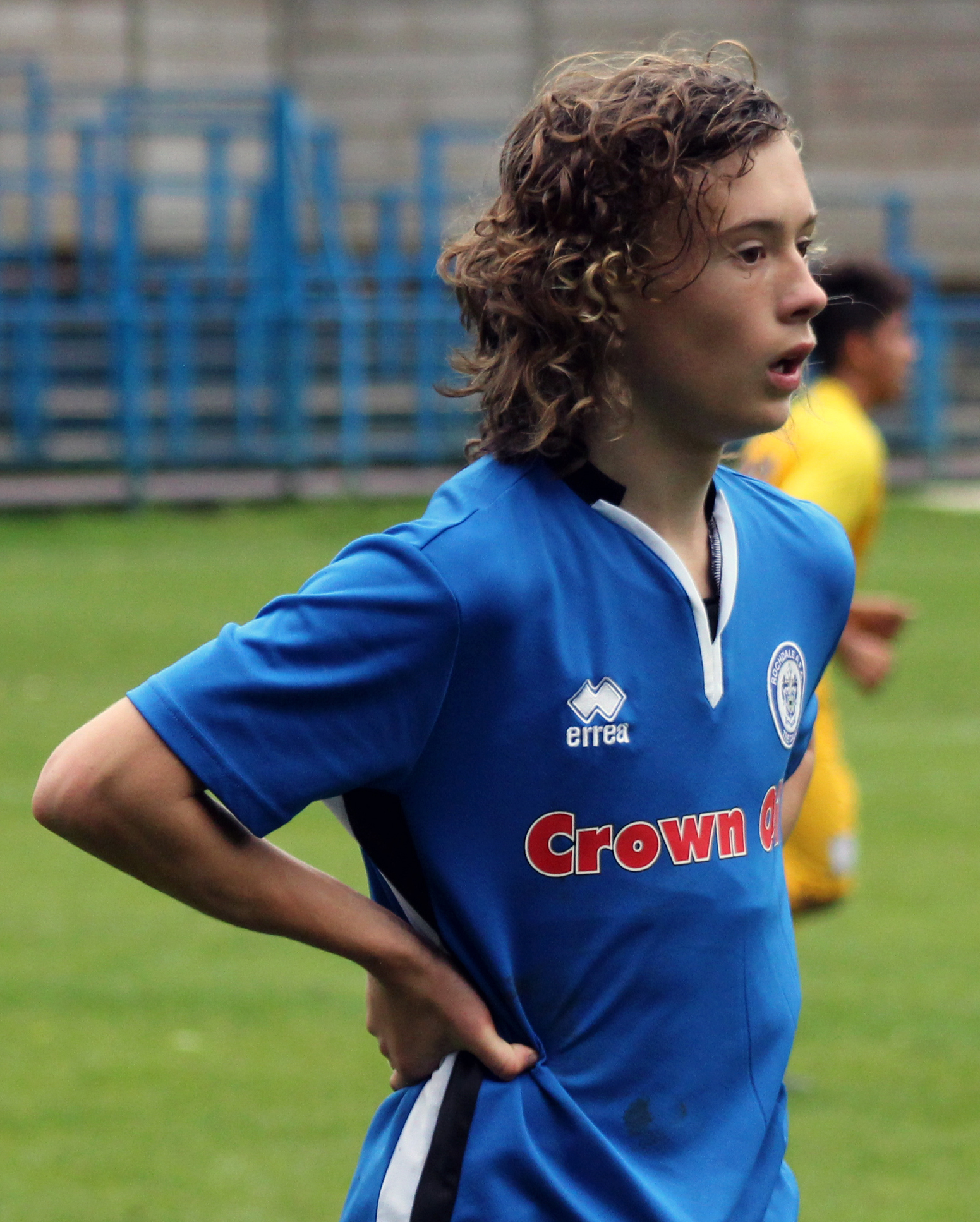
Luke Matheson

- 2 January – Jonjo Heuerman, charity fundraiser
- 18 January – Samuel Joslin, actor (The Impossible, Paddington)
- 31 January – Jensen Weir, English footballer
- 1 February – Connor Smith, Scottish footballer (Hearts)
- 11 February – Barry Baggley, Northern Irish footballer (Fleetwood Town)
- 23 February – Emilia Jones, English actress
- 10 March – Noni Madueke, English footballer
- 16 March – Isabelle Allen, English actress
- 27 March – Ty Tennant, English actor
- 4 April – Damian Hurley, actor and model
- 18 April – Maya Le Tissier, footballer (Brighton & Hove Albion)
- 4 May – Joe Gelhardt, footballer (Wigan Athletic)
- 6 May – Cole Palmer, footballer
- 10 May – Haydon Roberts, footballer (Brighton & Hove Albion)
- 14 May – Lady Margarita Armstrong-Jones, member of the British Royal Family, daughter of David Armstrong-Jones, 2nd Earl of Snowdon and Serena Armstrong-Jones, Countess of Snowdon.
- 15 May – Amy Hunt, sprinter
- 31 May – Nathan Wood, footballer (Middlesbrough)
- 26 June – Hayden Hackney, footballer
- 26 July – Morgan Rogers, footballer (West Bromwich Albion)
- 30 July – Finn Ecrepont, Scottish footballer (Ayr United)
- 4 August – Kieron Williamson, watercolourist
- 8 August – Katie Robinson, footballer (Bristol City)
- 9 August – Owen Beck, Welsh footballer
- 17 August – Chloe Hawthorn, actress
- 4 September – Alfie Chang, Malaysian footballer
- 21 September – Isabella Blake-Thomas, actor
- 1 October – Milo Parker, child actor (Mr. Holmes, The Durrells, Miss Peregrine's Home for Peculiar Children)
- 2 October – Luke Matheson, footballer (Rochdale)
- 10 October – James Trafford, footballer
- 6 November – Mya-Lecia Naylor, actress, model and singer (died 2019)
- 13 November – Emma Raducanu, Canadian-born tennis player
- 2 December – Eden Cheng, diver
- 22 December – Emma Finucane, Welsh track cyclist
- Approximate date – Jack Topping, chorister

== Deaths ==
=== January ===
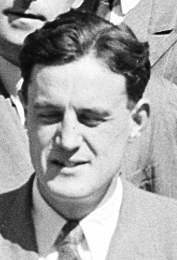
Robert Hanbury Brown

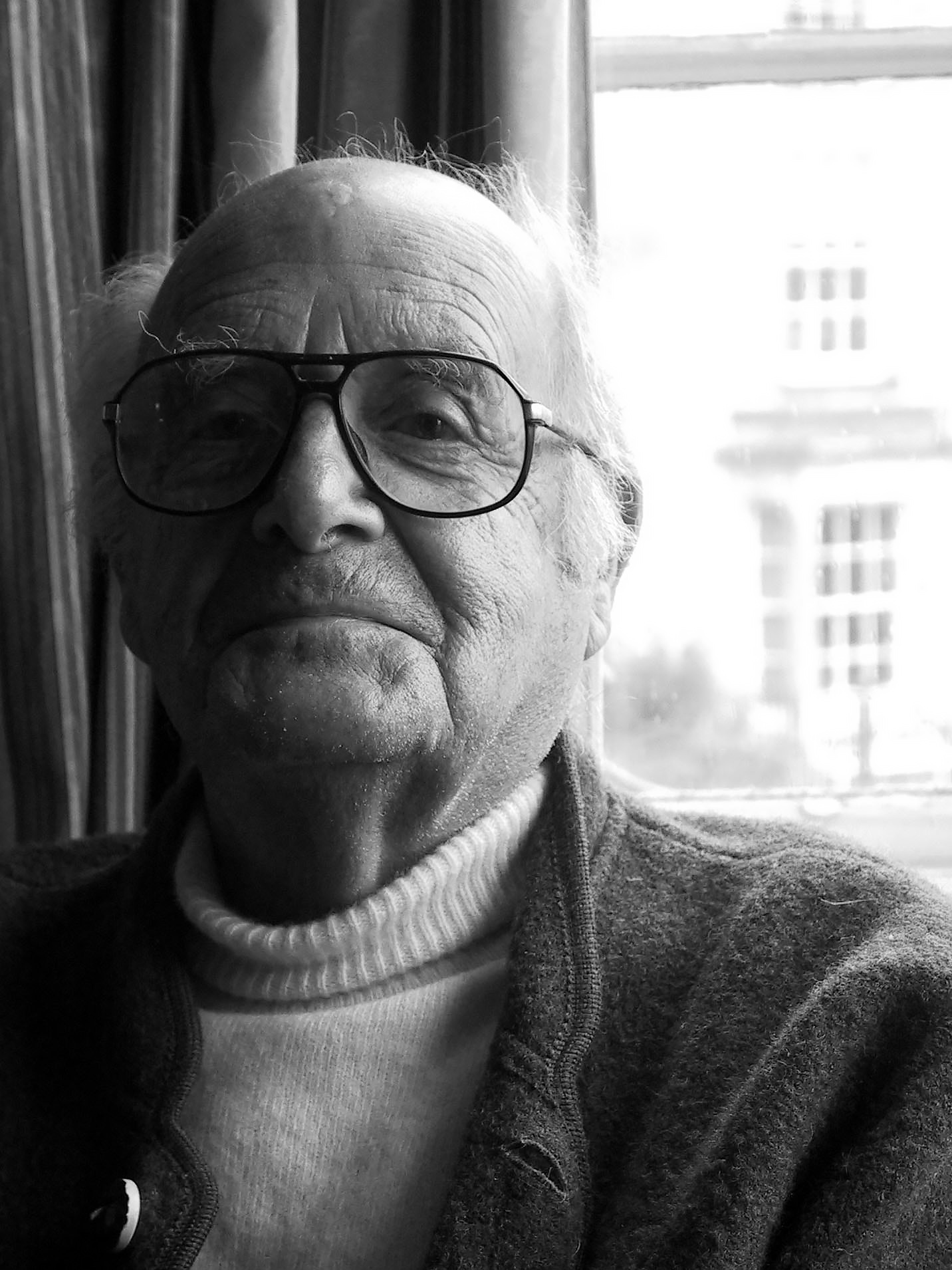
Eric de Maré

- 2 January – Ian Grist, Conservative politician (born 1938)
- 5 January – Graham Ryder, geologist (born 1949)
- 6 January – Marian Wenzel, art historian (born 1932)
- 7 January – Geoffrey Crossley, racing driver (born 1921)
- 8 January
  - M. S. Bartlett, statistician (born 1910)
  - Charles "Nish" Bruce, soldier and author (born 1956)
  - David McWilliams, Northern Irish singer-songwriter (born 1945)
- 10 January
  - Philip Drazin, mathematician (born 1934)
  - Cedric Smith, statistician (born 1917)
- 12 January
  - Bernard Bennett, snooker player (born 1931)
  - Stanley Unwin, actor and comedian (born 1911, South Africa)
- 14 January – Michael Young, Baron Young of Dartington, sociologist who coined the term "meritocracy" (born 1915)
- 15 January – Jeremy Hawk, actor (born 1918)
- 16 January
  - Robert Hanbury Brown, astronomer (born 1916, India)
  - Michael Walford, field hockey player (born 1915)
- 17 January
  - Peter Adamson, actor (born 1930)
  - Queenie Leonard, actress (born 1905)
- 19 January – Jeff Astle, footballer (born 1942)
- 20 January – Harold Kasket, actor (born 1926)
- 21 January – Marjorie Lewty, writer (born 1906)
- 22 January
  - Kenneth Armitage, sculptor (born 1916)
  - Peter Bardens, keyboardist (Camel) (born 1945)
  - Eric de Maré, architectural photographer (born 1910)
  - John McGrath, playwright (born 1935)
- 24 January – Stuart Burge, actor and producer (born 1918)
- 26 January – Dorothy Carrington, writer (born 1910)
- 27 January – John James, racing driver (born 1914)
- 29 January
  - R. M. Hare, moral philosopher (born 1919)
  - Stratford Johns, actor (born 1925, South Africa)
  - James Marjoribanks, diplomat (born 1911)

=== February ===
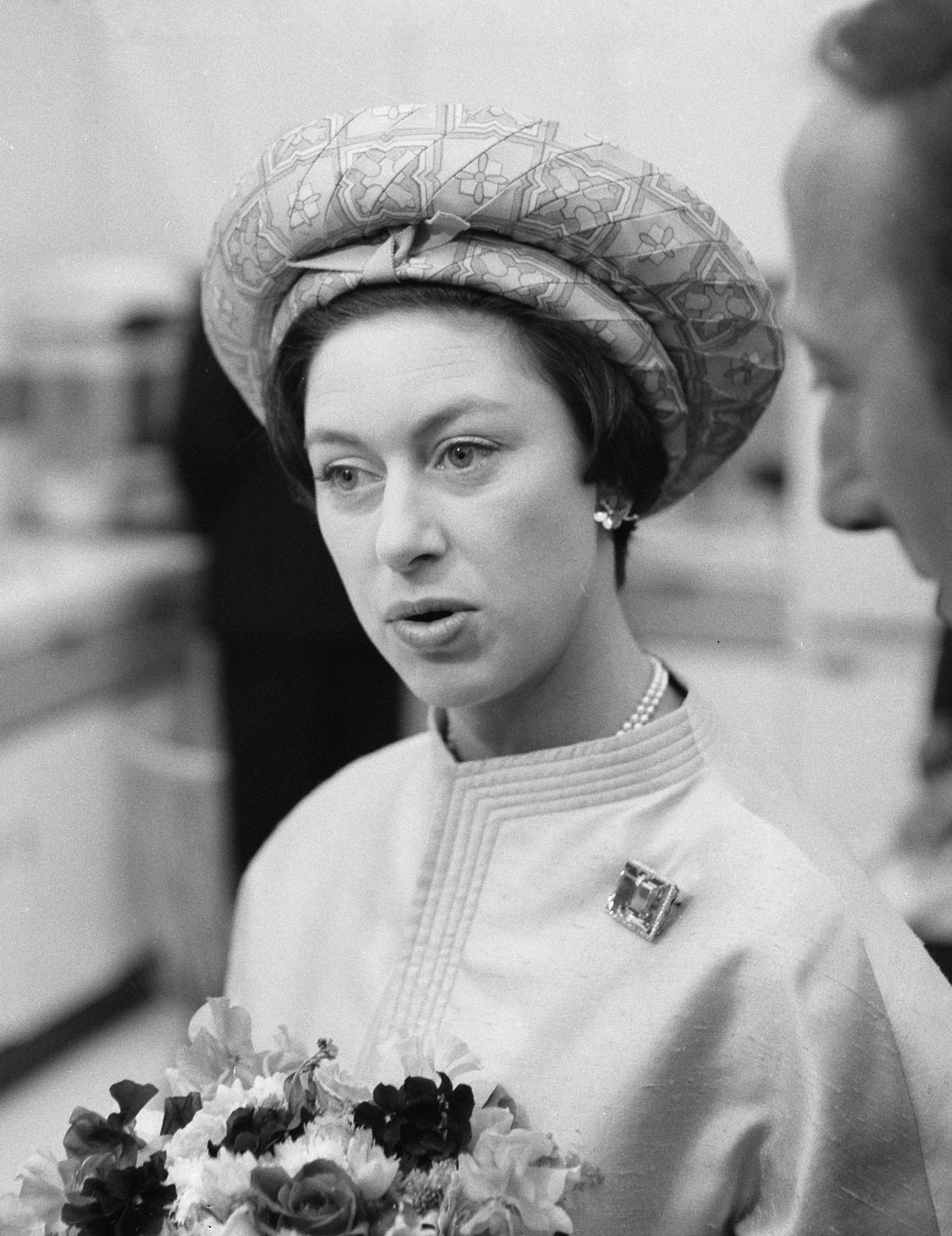
Princess Margaret, Countess of Snowdon

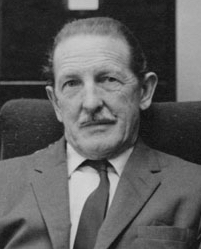
Raymond Firth

- 2 February – Robin Medforth-Mills, professor and former husband of Princess Elena of Romania (born 1942)
- 3 February – Charles Reep, football analyst (born 1904)
- 4 February – Bert Head, English footballer and football manager (born 1916)
- 5 February – Angela du Maurier, actress and novelist, sister of Daphne du Maurier (born 1904)
- 6 February – Max Perutz, molecular biologist (born 1914, Austria-Hungary)
- 7 February
  - Jack Fairman, racing driver (born 1913)
  - Tony Pond, rally driver (born 1945)
- 8 February – Bob Wooler, disc jockey (born 1926)
- 9 February
  - Birkin Haward, architect, author and artist (born 1912)
  - Princess Margaret, Countess of Snowdon, sister of the Queen (born 1930)
- 10 February
  - Leslie Barnett, microbiologist (born 1920)
  - John Erickson, historian (born 1929)
- 11 February – Barry Foster, actor (heart attack) (born 1931)
- 12 February – Erna Low, businesswoman (born 1909, Austria-Hungary)
- 13 February
  - George Bray, English footballer (born 1918)
  - Sidney Weighell, footballer and trade unionist (born 1922)
- 14 February – Mick Tucker, rock drummer (Sweet) (born 1947)
- 16 February
  - Sidney De Haan, businessman, founder of Saga (born 1919)
  - Sir Walter Winterbottom, footballer and football manager (born 1913)
- 17 February – Anthony Benjamin, painter, sculptor and printmaker (born 1931)
- 21 February
  - A. L. Barker, writer (born 1918)
  - Trevor Hampton, scuba diver (born 1912)
  - John Thaw, actor (born 1942)
- 22 February – Raymond Firth, anthropologist (born 1901, New Zealand)
- 24 February – Martin Esslin, producer, dramatist and journalist (born 1918, Austria-Hungary)
- 25 February – Claire Davenport, actress (born 1933)
- 27 February – Spike Milligan, comedian, writer and poet (born 1918, India)

=== March ===
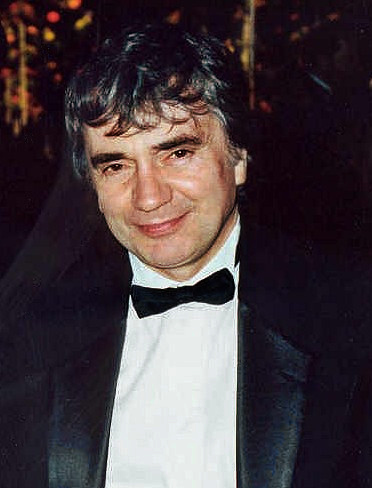
Dudley Moore

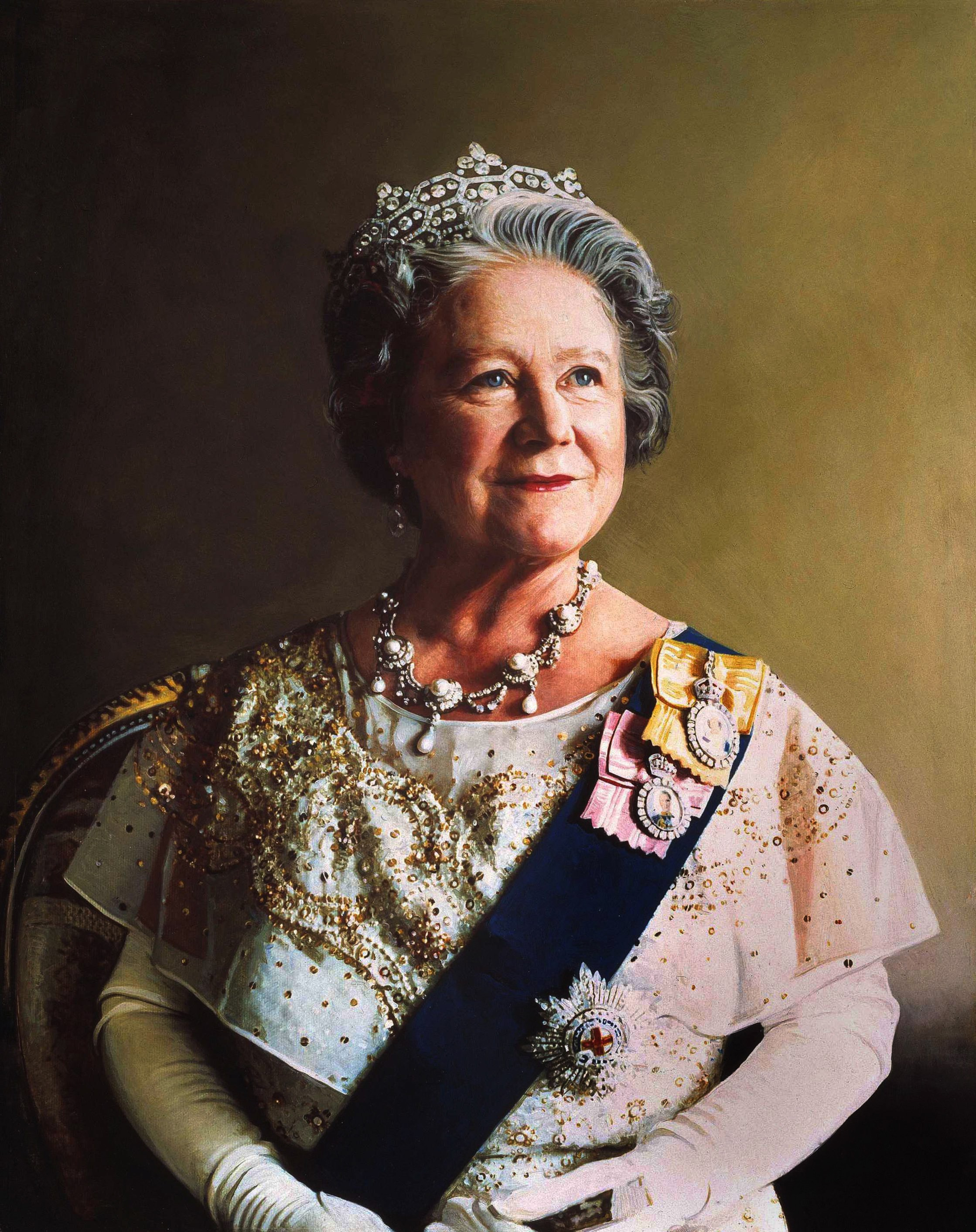
Queen Elizabeth The Queen Mother

- 1 March
  - John Challens, scientist and civil servant (born 1915)
  - Doreen Waddell, singer (Soul II Soul) (car accident) (born 1965)
- 3 March – Roy Porter, historian (born 1946)
- 4 March
  - Eric Flynn, actor and singer (born 1939)
  - Prunella Ransome, actress (born 1943)
  - Shirley Ann Russell, costume designer (born 1935)
- 5 March
  - Frances Macdonald, artist (born 1914)
  - Harry Wingfield, illustrator (Ladybird Books) (born 1910)
- 6 March – Donald Wilson, screenwriter and television producer (born 1910)
- 7 March – Geoff Charles, Welsh photojournalist (born 1909)
- 8 March – Peter Holmes, businessman (born 1932, Greece)
- 9 March – Hamish Henderson, Scottish poet (born 1919)
- 11 March – Herbert Spencer, graphic designer, writer and photographer (born 1924)
- 12 March – John "Speedy" Keen, singer-songwriter (born 1945)
- 16 March – Sir Marcus Fox, Conservative politician (born 1927)
- 23 March
  - James Culliford, actor (born 1927)
  - Ben Hollioake, English cricketer (car accident) (born 1977, Australia)
- 25 March – Kenneth Wolstenholme, sports commentator (born 1920)
- 27 March – Dudley Moore, comedian and actor (born 1935)
- 28 March – F. N. Souza, artist (born 1924, India)
- 30 March – Queen Elizabeth The Queen Mother, consort of George VI and mother of Elizabeth II (born 1900)
- 31 March
  - Lady Anne Brewis, botanist (born 1911)
  - Barry Took, comedian, writer and broadcast presenter (born 1928)

=== April ===
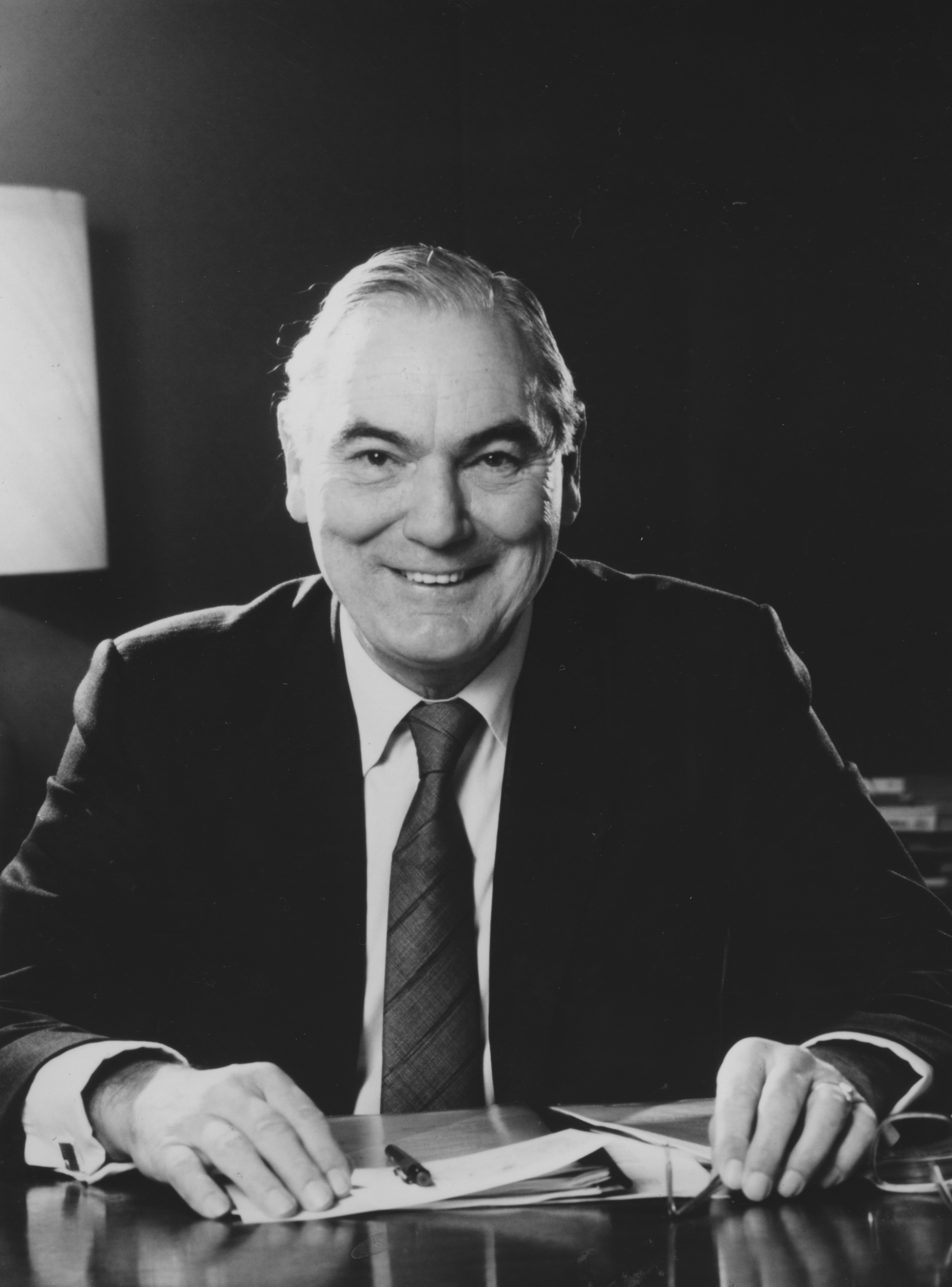
Sir Peter Parker

- 2 April – Ike Clarke, English footballer and football manager (born 1915)
- 3 April – Fad Gadget, singer-songwriter (born 1956)
- 6 April – Margaret Wingfield, Liberal politician (born 1912)
- 8 April – Sir Nigel Bagnall, field marshal and former Chief of the General Staff (born 1927)
- 11 April – Delphi Lawrence, actress (born 1932)
- 12 April – Henry van Straubenzee, Army lieutenant-colonel and cricketer (born 1914, South Africa)
- 13 April – Desmond Titterington, Northern Irish racing driver (born 1928)
- 14 April – Sir Michael Kerr, judge (born 1921, Germany)
- 15 April
  - Dave King, actor and comedian (born 1929)
  - Will Reed, composer (born 1910)
- 16 April – Billy Ayre, football coach, manager and former player (born 1952)
- 17 April – James Copeland, actor (born 1918)
- 18 April – Cy Laurie, musician (born 1926)
- 21 April
  - Christopher Price, journalist and broadcaster (born 1967)
  - Terry Walsh, actor and stuntman (born 1939)
- 25 April – Michael Bryant, actor (born 1928)
- 27 April – Arthur Owen, racing driver (born 1915)
- 28 April
  - Sir Peter Parker, businessman (British Railways Board) (born 1924)
  - Gerd Sommerhoff, neuroscientist (born 1915)
- 29 April
  - Michael Camille, art historian (born 1958)
  - Pete Jacobsen, jazz pianist (born 1950)

=== May ===
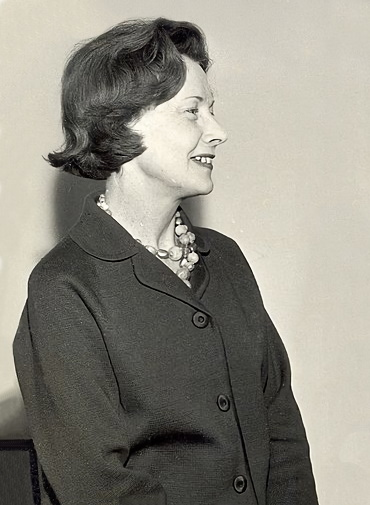
Barbara Castle

- 1 May – John Nathan-Turner, screenwriter and producer (born 1947)
- 2 May – Olive Cook, writer and artist (born 1912)
- 3 May – Barbara Castle, Baroness Castle of Blackburn, Labour politician (born 1910)
- 4 May – John Hasted, physicist and folk musician (born 1921)
- 7 May
  - Sir Bernard Burrows, diplomat (born 1910)
  - Sir Ewart Jones, chemist (born 1911)
- 8 May – Basil Chubb, political scientist, author and broadcaster (born 1921)
- 10 May – Austen Kark, television executive (killed in the Potters Bar rail crash) (born 1926)
- 11 May – Diane Pretty, right-to-die campaigner (born 1958)
- 12 May – Richard Chorley, geographer (born 1927)
- 14 May – Sir Laurence Sinclair, air marshal (born 1908)
- 15 May – Bryan Pringle, actor (born 1935)
- 17 May
  - James Chichester-Clark, Northern Irish politician (born 1923)
  - Norman Vaughan, comedian (born 1923)
- 18 May
  - Davey Boy Smith, professional wrestler (born 1962)
  - Gordon Wharmby, actor (born 1933)
- 19 May – Raymond Durgnat, film critic (born 1932)
- 21 May – Roy Paul, footballer (born 1920)
- 22 May
  - Dick Hern, racehorse trainer (born 1921)
  - Patrick Wolrige-Gordon, Conservative politician (born 1935)
- 25 May – Pat Coombs, actress (born 1926)
- 27 May
  - Marjorie Ogilvie Anderson, Scottish historian (born 1909)
  - Barbara Hamilton, 14th Baroness Dudley, British noblewoman (born 1907)
- 30 May
  - Kenny Craddock, musician, composer and producer (car accident) (born 1950)
  - Walter Laird, dancer (born 1920)
- 31 May – Jeremy Bray, Labour politician (born 1930, Hong Kong)

=== June ===
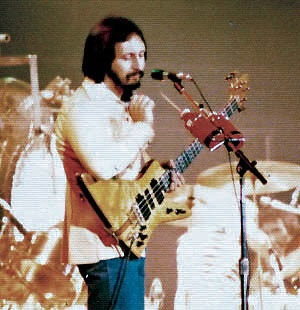
John Entwistle

- 3 June – Brian Woledge, scholar of medieval French literature (born 1904)
- 7 June – Rodney Hilton, historian (born 1916)
- 11 June – Peter John Stephens, children's author (born 1912)
- 14 June – George William Coventry, 11th Earl of Coventry, peer (born 1934)
- 16 June – Barbara Goalen, model (born 1921)
- 17 June – Louis George Alexander, teacher and author (born 1932)
- 18 June – Michael Coulson, lawyer and politician (born 1927)
- 19 June
  - Margaret Johnston, actress (born 1914, Australia)
  - William Summers, former Crown Jeweller (born 1930)
- 23 June – Alice Stewart, physician and epidemologist (born 1906)
- 24 June – Miles Fitzalan-Howard, 17th Duke of Norfolk, peer and Army general (born 1915)
- 25 June
  - Henry Thomas Davies, lifeboatman (born 1914)
  - Douglas Hugh Everett, chemist (born 1916)
- 26 June
  - Arnold Brown, General of the Salvation Army (1977–1981) (born 1913)
  - Donald A. Bullough, historian (born 1928)
- 27 June
  - Charles Frederick Carter, economist (born 1919)
  - John Entwistle, bassist (The Who) (born 1944)

=== July ===
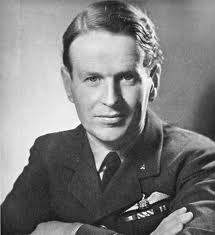
John Cunningham

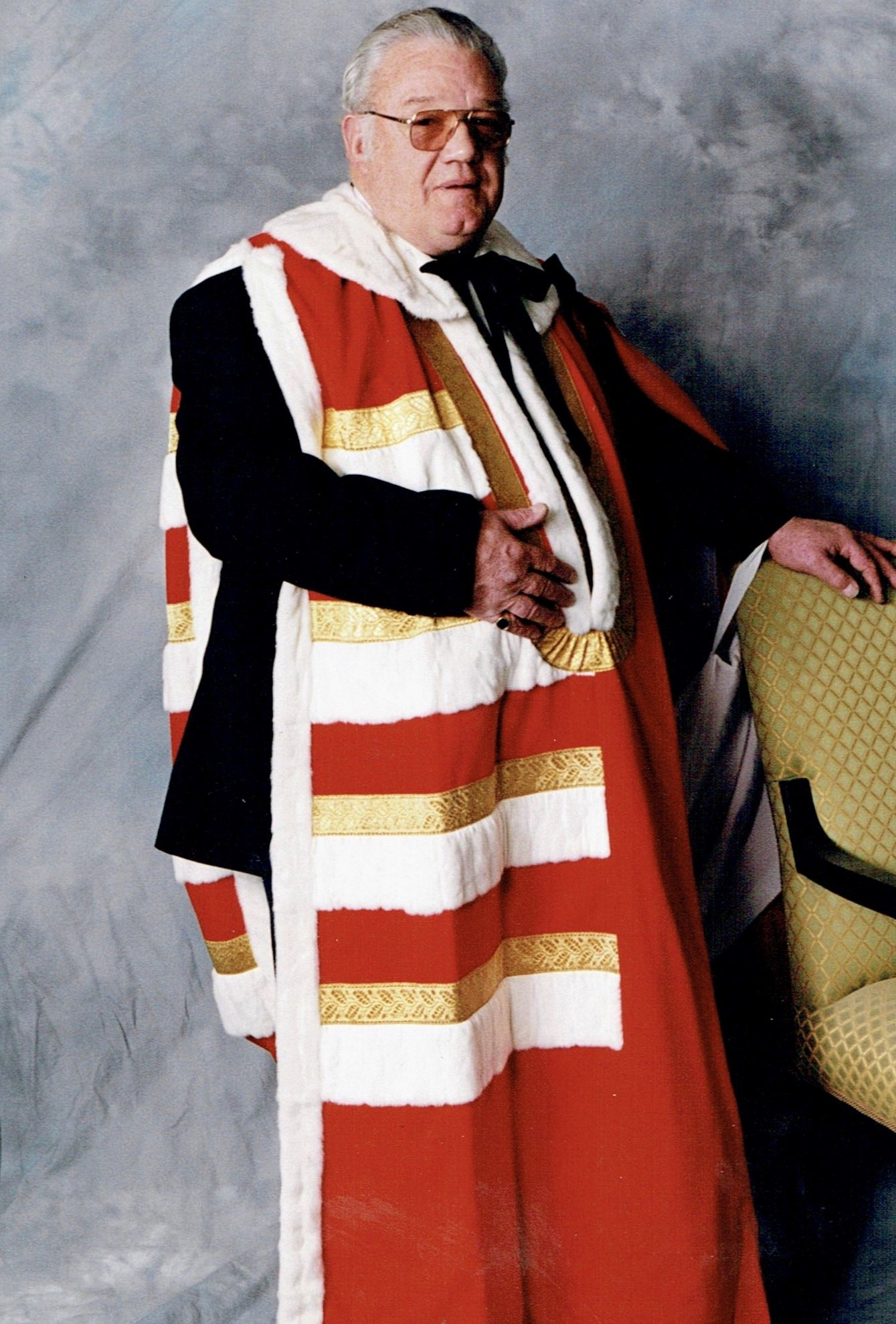
12th Duke of Manchester

- 4 July
  - Ivan Moffat, screenwriter, film producer and socialite (born 1918)
  - Winnifred Quick, English-American survivor of the sinking of the RMS Titanic (born 1904)
  - Jake Saunders, banker (born 1917)
- 7 July – Ray Wood, footballer (Manchester United) (born 1931)
- 9 July
  - Gerald Campion, actor (born 1921)
  - Madron Seligman, Conservative politician (born 1918)
  - Kenneth Snowman, jeweller (born 1919)
- 11 July – Helen Grindrod, judge (born 1936)
- 12 July – Tim Rathbone, Conservative politician (born 1933)
- 13 July – Carey Blyton, composer and writer (born 1932)
- 14 July – Michael Stern, educator (car accident) (born 1922)
- 15 July
  - Charles R. Burton, explorer (born 1942)
  - Gavin Muir, actor (born 1951)
- 17 July – Clare Fell, archaeologist (born 1912)
- 18 July – Victor Emery, physicist and academic (born 1933)
- 19 July – Frank Taylor, sports journalist (born 1920)
- 21 July
  - John Cunningham, Royal Air Force officer in World War II (born 1917)
  - Gus Dudgeon, record producer (car accident) (born 1942)
  - Peter Elstob, World War II soldier and military historian (born 1915)
  - Jeffrey Harborne, chemist (born 1928)
- 23 July – Arnold Weinstock, Baron Weinstock, businessman (born 1924)
- 24 July – Maurice Denham, actor (born 1909)
- 25 July – Angus Montagu, 12th Duke of Manchester, peer (born 1938)
- 26 July
  - Tony Anholt, actor (born 1941)
  - Pat Douthwaite, artist (born 1934)
- 28 July – Archer John Porter Martin, chemist, Nobel Prize laureate (born 1910)
- 29 July – Peter Bayliss, actor (born 1922)
- 30 July
  - George Alfred Barnard, statistician (born 1915)
  - A. E. Dyson, literary critic (born 1928)
- 31 July
  - Sir Peter Ashmore, Royal Navy vice-admiral and Master of the Household to the Sovereign (born 1921)
  - Francis Searle, film director and producer (born 1909)

=== August ===
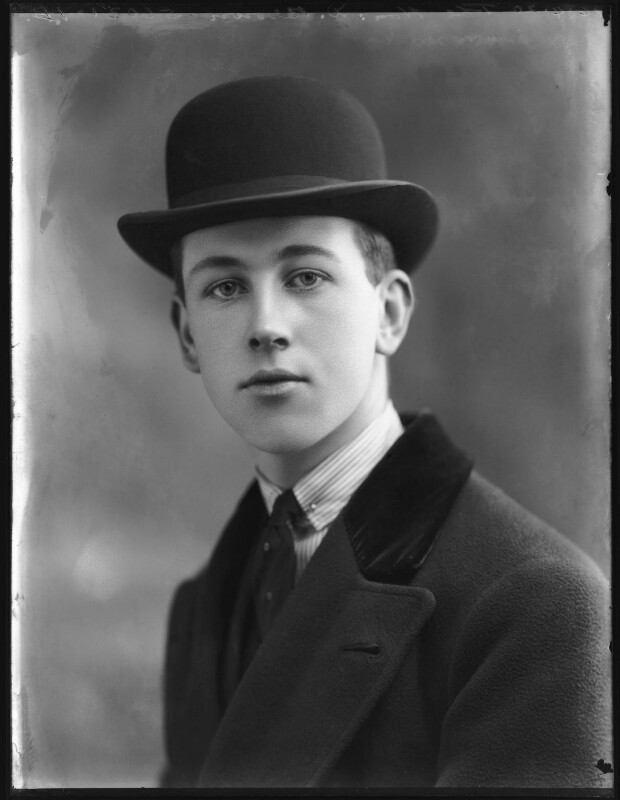
Dominick Browne, 4th Baron Oranmore and Browne

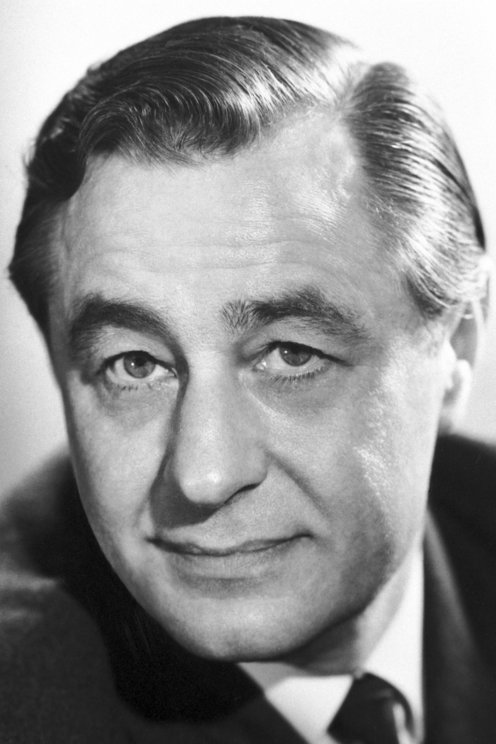
George Porter

- 1 August – Geoffrey Paulson Townsend, architect (born 1911)
- 4 August – Carmen Silvera, actress (born 1922)
- 5 August – Winifred Watson, writer (born 1906)
- 6 August
  - Jim Crawford, racing driver (born 1948)
  - John Fage, historian (born 1921)
- 7 August
  - Dominick Browne, 4th Baron Oranmore and Browne, peer (born 1901)
  - Molly Harrison, museum curator (born 1909)
- 8 August – Ronnie Stephenson, jazz drummer (born 1937)
- 9 August – Paul Samson, guitarist (born 1953)
- 11 August – Richard Wood, Baron Holderness, Conservative politician (born 1920)
- 12 August
  - Michael De-la-Noy, journalist and author (born 1932)
  - John Rennie, diplomat (born 1917)
  - Dame Marjorie Williamson, educator and university administrator (born 1913)
- 14 August – Peter R. Hunt, film editor (born 1925)
- 17 August – Tony Zemaitis, guitar maker (born 1935)
- 18 August – Edward Crew, Royal Air Force officer in World War II (born 1917)
- 19 August – Alastair Gordon, 6th Marquess of Aberdeen and Temair, peer and art critic (born 1920)
- 20 August – John Willett, translator (born 1917)
- 21 August – Jimmy Deane, revolutionary socialist (born 1921)
- 23 August – Stafford Beer, theorist and author (born 1926)
- 24 August – Hugh Cruttwell, drama teacher and consultant (born 1918, Singapore)
- 27 August
  - George Mitchell, musician (born 1917)
  - Crew Stoneley, Olympic athlete (born 1911)
- 29 August
  - Lance Macklin, racing driver (born 1919)
  - Alan MacNaughtan, actor (born 1920)
- 30 August – J. Lee Thompson, film director (born 1914)
- 31 August – George Porter, Baron Porter of Luddenham, chemist, Nobel Prize laureate (born 1920)

=== September ===
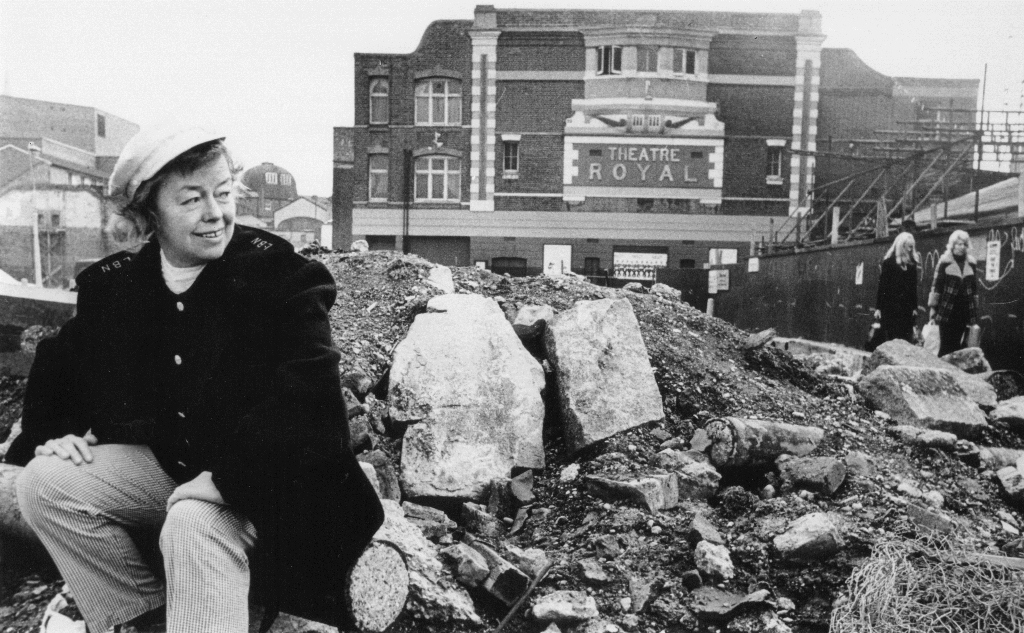
Joan Littlewood

- 1 September – Peter Ramsden, rugby league player (born 1934)
- 2 September – Robert Wilson, astrophysicist (born 1927)
- 3 September – Len Wilkinson, cricketer (Lancashire) (born 1916)
- 5 September – William Cooper, novelist (born 1910)
- 6 September
  - Michael Argyle, psychologist (born 1925)
  - Peter Donaldson, economist (born 1934)
  - Janet Young, Baroness Young, Conservative politician, first woman Leader of the House of Lords (born 1926)
- 7 September
  - Katrin Cartlidge, actress (born 1961)
  - Michael Elphick, actor (born 1946)
- 8 September – Ken Ashton, journalist and trade union leader (born 1925)
- 9 September – Geoffrey Dummer, electronics engineer (born 1909)
- 12 September – Neil Shields, politician and businessman (born 1919)
- 13 September
  - Sir Douglas Black, physician (born 1913)
  - George Hills, journalist (born 1918, Mexico)
  - Sir Brooks Richards, diplomat and SOE operator in World War II (born 1918)
- 14 September – Frederic Bennett, lawyer, journalist and politician (born 1918)
- 15 September – James Mitchell, crime writer (born 1926)
- 16 September – Archibald Hall, convicted serial killer (born 1924)
- 17 September – Eileen Colwell, author and librarian (born 1904)
- 19 September – Duncan Hallas, Communist politician (born 1925)
- 20 September – Joan Littlewood, theatre director (born 1914)
- 22 September – Anthony Milner, composer (born 1925)
- 23 September
  - Vernon Corea, broadcaster (born 1927)
  - James Scarlett, 8th Baron Abinger, peer (born 1914)
- 29 September – Bob Cobbing, poet (born 1920)
- 30 September – Ewart Oakeshott, illustrator (born 1916)

=== October ===
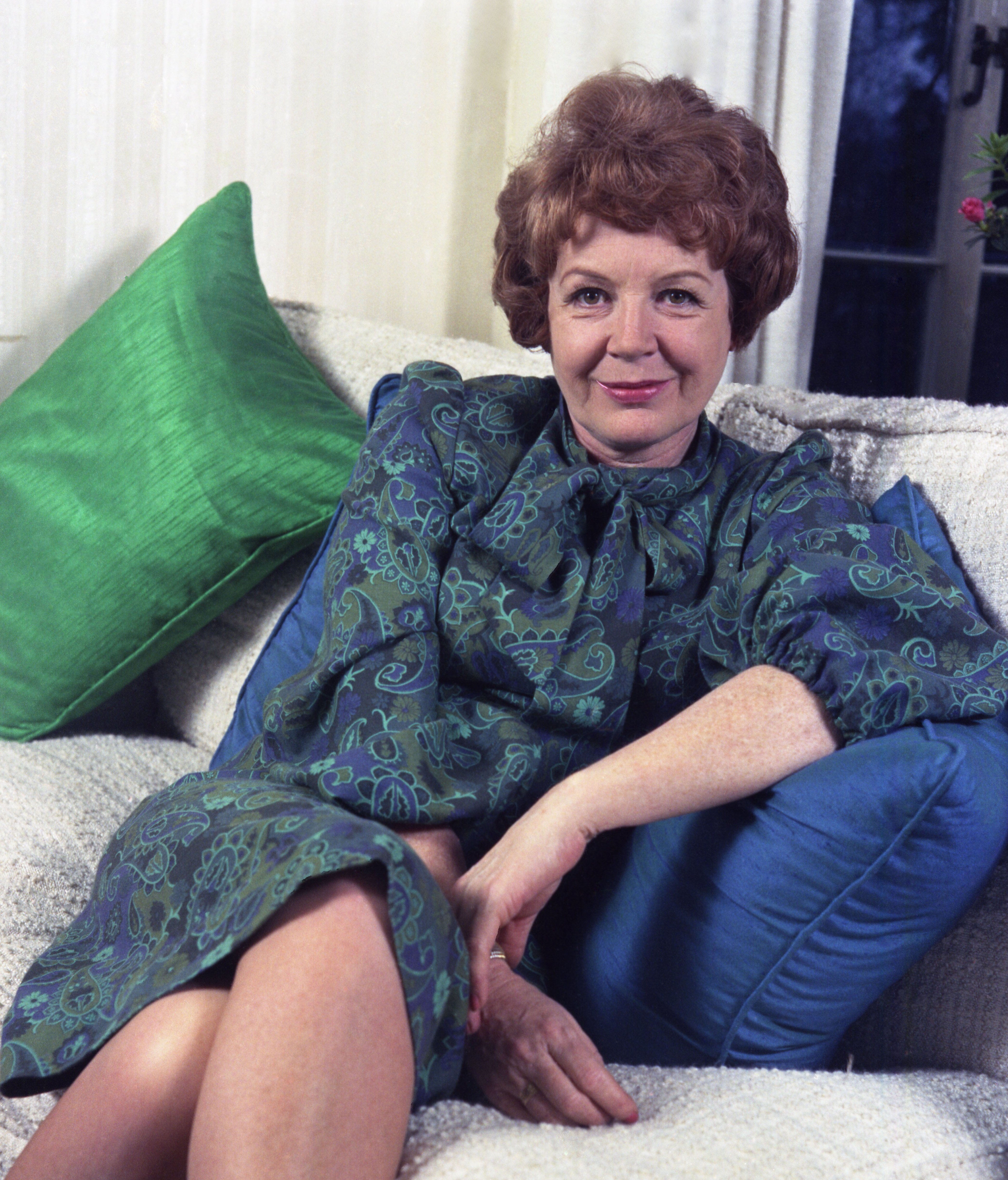
Phyllis Calvert

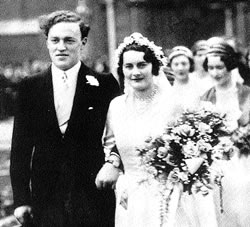
Elizabeth Pakenham, Countess of Longford with her husband on their wedding day

- 4 October
  - Fram Farrington, scientific officer (born 1908)
  - Barbara Fawkes, nurse (born 1914)
- 5 October
  - Sir Reginald Hibbert, diplomat (born 1922)
  - Morag Hood, actress (born 1942)
- 6 October – Nick Whitehead, Olympic sprinter (1960) (born 1933)
- 8 October – Phyllis Calvert, actress (born 1915)
- 10 October – Lady Marguerite Tangye, debutante and actress (born 1913)
- 12 October
  - Sir Desmond Fitzpatrick, Army general (born 1912)
  - Mick Shoebottom, rugby league player (born 1944)
- 14 October
  - Grace Hamblin, secretary to Sir Winston and Lady Clementine Churchill (born 1908)
  - Jack Lee, film director (born 1913)
- 17 October
  - Derek Bell, Northern Irish musician (The Chieftains) (born 1935)
  - Pattie Coldwell, television presenter (born 1952)
- 18 October – Sir Cecil Blacker, Army general (born 1916)
- 21 October – Beatrice Serota, Baroness Serota, politician and mother of Nicholas Serota (born 1919)
- 22 October – Robert Nixon, cartoonist (born 1939)
- 23 October – Elizabeth Pakenham, Countess of Longford, historian and wife of Frank Pakenham, 7th Earl of Longford (born 1906)
- 24 October – Charmian May, actress (born 1937)
- 25 October – Ian Russell, 13th Duke of Bedford, peer (born 1917)
- 28 October – Thomas Patrick Russell, judge (born 1926)
- 31 October
  - Sir Napier Crookenden, Army general (born 1915)
  - Audrey Hylton-Foster, Baroness Hylton-Foster, peer (born 1908)

=== November ===
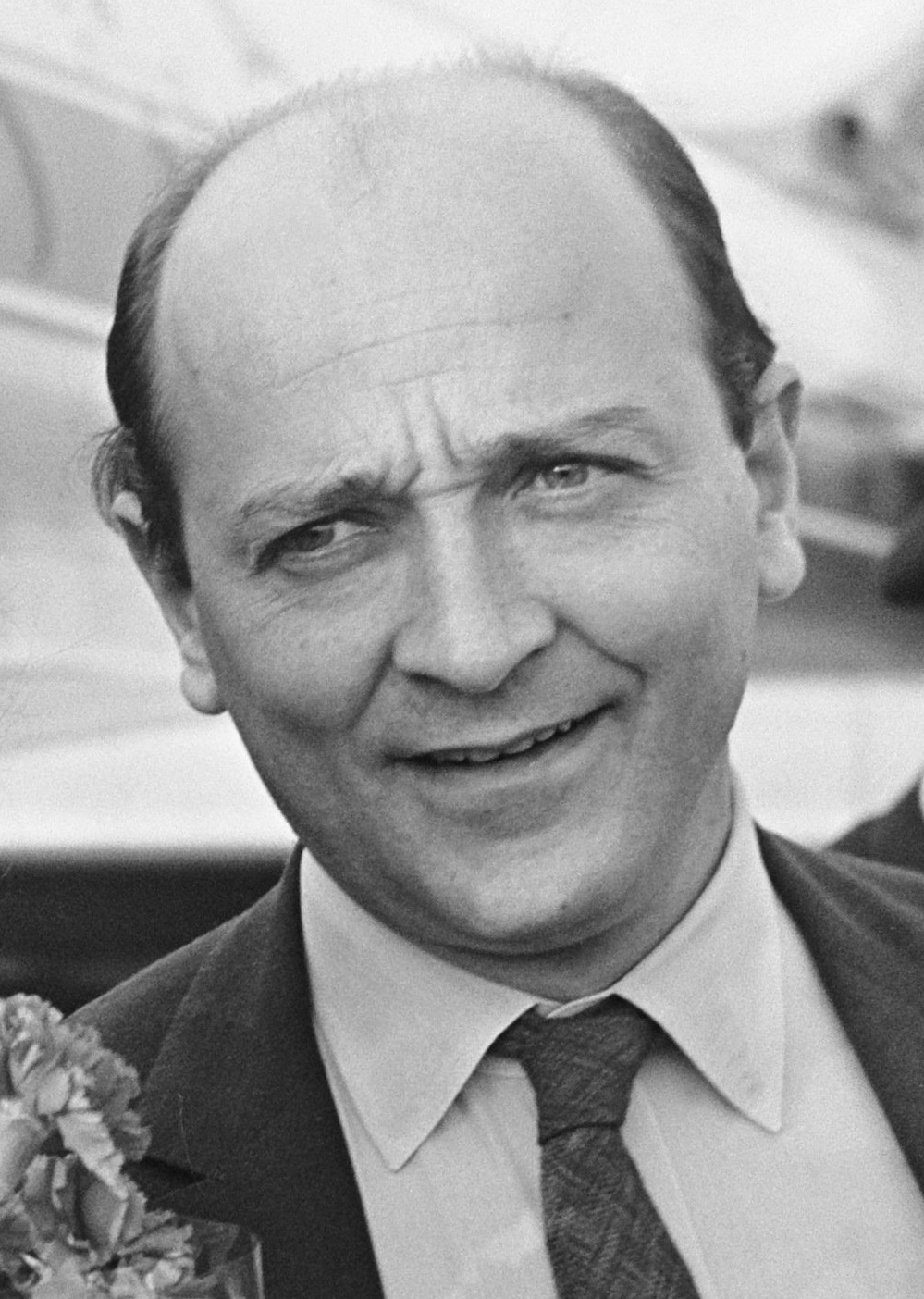
Karel Reisz

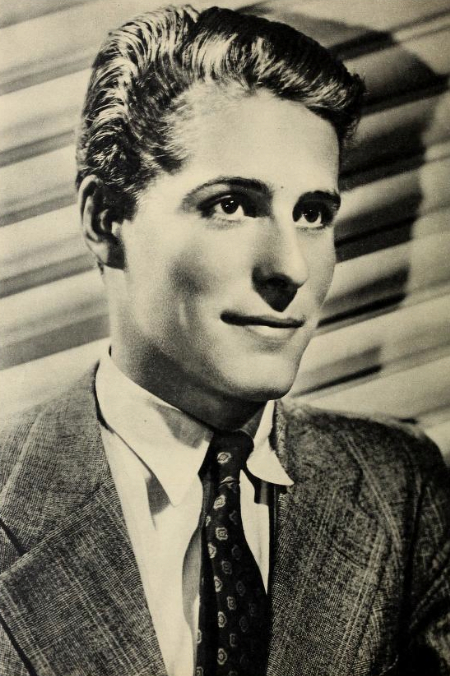
John Justin

- 1 November – Sir Charles Wilson, political scientist (born 1909)
- 2 November
  - Robert Haslam, industrialist (born 1923)
  - Annelisa Kilbourn, conservationist (plane crash) (born 1967)
  - Charles Sheffield, author and physicist (born 1935)
- 3 November
  - Lonnie Donegan, musician (King of Skiffle) (born 1931)
  - Sir John Habakkuk, economic historian (born 1915)
  - Sir Rex Roe, air marshal (born 1925)
- 7 November
  - Charles Hambro, Baron Hambro, banker and political fundraiser (born 1930)
  - Dilys Hamlett, actress (born 1928)
- 8 November
  - Dorothy Mackie Low, novelist (born 1916)
  - Christopher Parsons, film-maker (born 1932)
- 11 November – Sir Michael Clapham, industrialist (born 1912)
- 12 November – David Francis Clyde, physician (born 1925)
- 13 November – Frederick Valentine Atkinson, mathematician, discoverer of Atkinson's theorem (born 1916)
- 15 November
  - W. J. Burley, crime writer (born 1914)
  - Myra Hindley, convicted Moors murderer (born 1942)
- 16 November
  - Sir George Gardiner, Conservative politician (born 1935)
  - Frank Smithies, mathematician (born 1912)
- 19 November – Max Reinhardt, publisher (born 1915, Ottoman Empire)
- 20 November – George Guest, organist and choirmaster (born 1924)
- 21 November – George Emslie, Baron Emslie, Scottish judge (born 1919)
- 22 November – Iain Hook, aid worker (murdered in Palestine) (born 1948)
- 25 November
  - David Drummond, 8th Earl of Perth, peer (born 1907)
  - Karel Reisz, film-maker (born 1926, Czechoslovakia)
- 27 November – Stanley Black, composer and bandleader (born 1913)
- 29 November – John Justin, actor (born 1917)
- 30 November – Bill Sparks, Royal Marine Commando in World War II (born 1922)

=== December ===
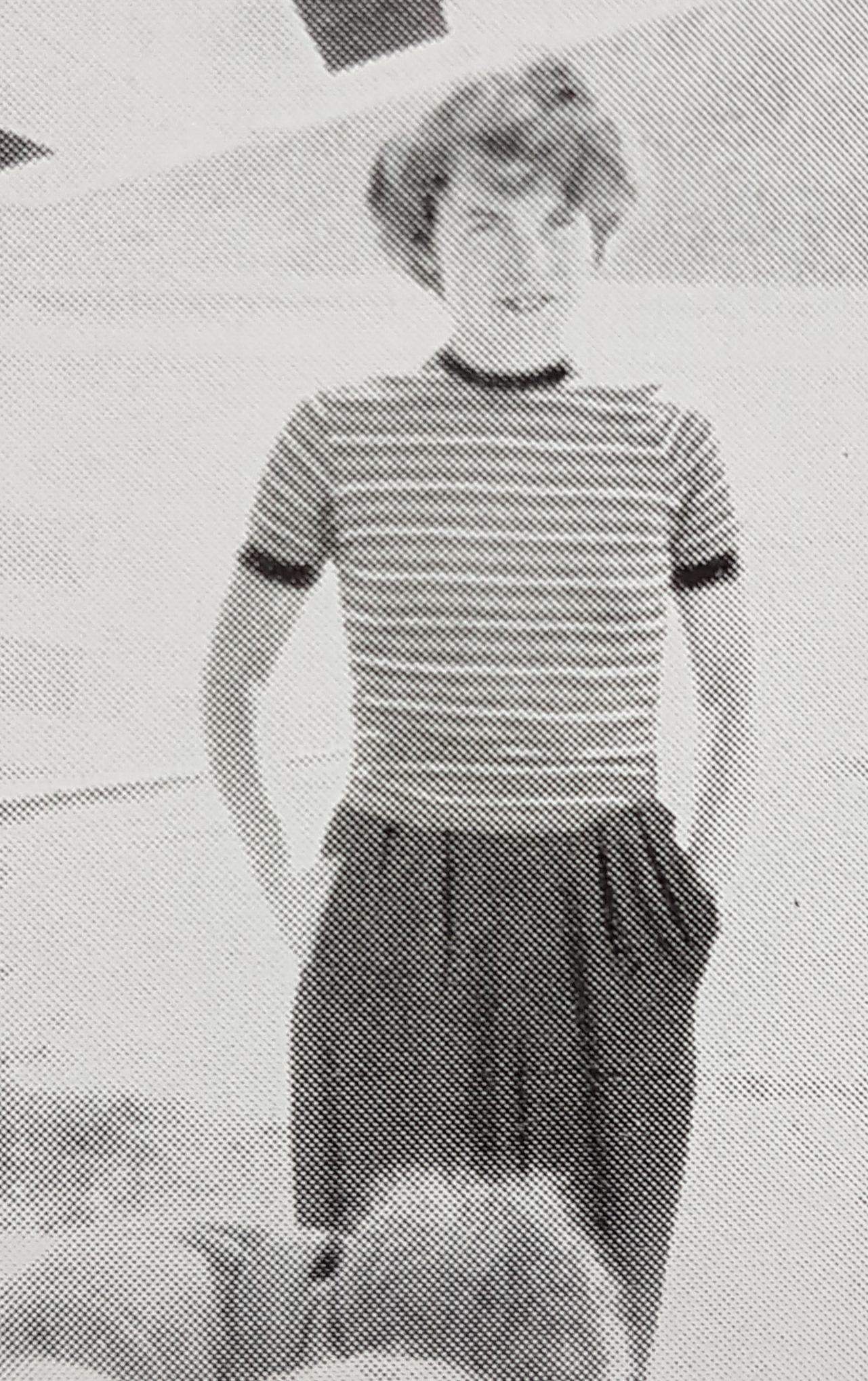
Ann Welch

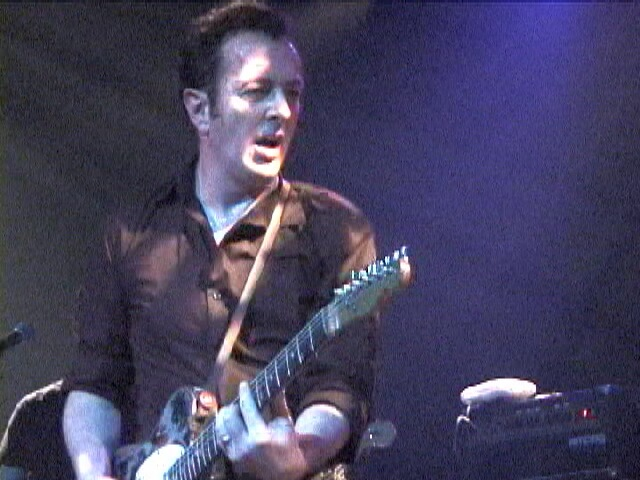
Joe Strummer

- 2 December
  - Derek Robinson, physicist (born 1941)
  - David Whiffen, physicist (born 1922)
- 5 December – Ann Welch, glider pilot (born 1917)
- 7 December – Clare Deniz, jazz pianist (born 1911)
- 10 December
  - Steve Llewellyn, rugby union player (born 1924)
  - Ian MacNaughton, television producer (Monty Python) (born 1925)
- 11 December – Arthur Metcalfe, racing cyclist (born 1938)
- 12 December – Edward Harrison, cricketer (born 1910)
- 13 December – Ronald Butt, journalist (born 1920)
- 17 December
  - Colin Clark, film-maker (born 1932)
  - James Hazeldine, actor and director (born 1947)
  - Frank Jordan, Chief Constable of Kent (born 1930)
  - Frederick Knott, playwright and screenwriter (born 1916)
- 18 December – Bert Millichip, chairman of The Football Association (born 1914)
- 19 December
  - Barbara Lott, actress (born 1920)
  - Arthur Rowley, footballer (Leicester City, Shrewsbury Town) (born 1926)
  - Roger Webb, musician and composer (born 1934)
- 20 December – Joanne Campbell, actress (born 1964)
- 21 December – Victor Watts, toponymist and medievalist (born 1938)
- 22 December – Joe Strummer, punk rock musician (The Clash) (born 1952)
- 23 December – Anthony Besch, opera and theatre director (born 1924)
- 24 December – Jake Thackray, singer-songwriter (born 1938)
- 29 December – Paul Hawkins, Conservative politician (born 1912)
- 30 December – Mary Wesley, novelist (born 1912)
- 31 December – Desmond Tester, actor and television presenter (born 1919)

== See also ==
- 2002 in British music
- 2002 in British television
- List of British films of 2002
