= Ludham =

Village in Norfolk, England

Coordinates: 52°42′37″N 1°32′08″E

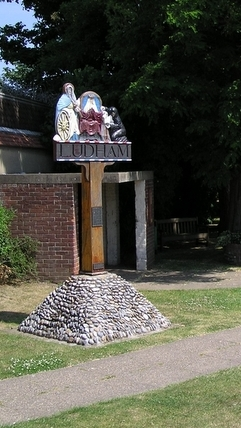
- Ludham village sign

- Location within Norfolk
- Area: 12.18 km^{2} (4.70 sq mi)
- Population: 1,278 (2011)
  - Density: 105/km^{2} (270/sq mi)
- OS grid reference: TG389183
- Civil parish: Ludham
- District: North Norfolk
- Shire county: Norfolk
- Region: East
- Country: England
- Sovereign state: United Kingdom
- Post town: GREAT YARMOUTH
- Postcode district: NR29
- Dialling code: 01692
- Police: Norfolk
- Fire: Norfolk
- Ambulance: East of England

Ludham is a village and civil parish in the English county of Norfolk, in the Norfolk Broads, at the end of a dyke leading to Womack Water and flowing into the River Thurne. It lies 1.5 miles (2.4 km) to the East of Ludham Bridge, which is on the River Ant, and approximately 15 miles (24 km) east-northeast of Norwich. It covers an area of 12.18 km^{2} (4.70 sq mi) and had a population of 1,301 in 582 households at the 2001 census, the population reducing to 1,278 at the 2011 census. For the purposes of local government, it falls within the district of North Norfolk.

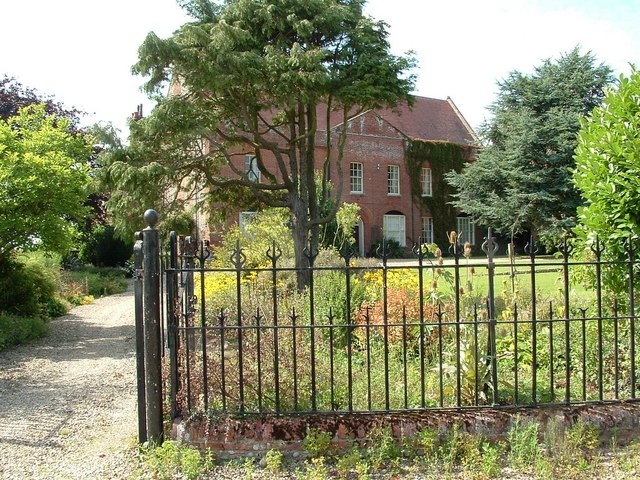
Ludham Hall on Johnson Street

The villages name origin is unsure. One possibility is 'Luda's homestead/village.' Another possibility is 'homestead/village on the Hlude (= noisy one)', an old name for Womack Water.

Ludham Hall was the former bishop's palace with a chapel now used as a barn. A palace of Bishops of Norwich it burnt down in 1611, and was rebuilt by Bishop Samuel Harsnett, with the chapel added 1627. The house of flint with ashlar quoins and some brick was refaced in the late 18th century in brick.

It is part of the Ludham - Potter Heigham NNR, a national nature reserve.

The village gave its name to a Ham-class minesweeper, HMS Ludham and also, in geology, to an age/stage (the Ludhamian) in the British regional subdivision of the Pleistocene Series/Epoch. It also effectively gives its name to the preceding age/underlying stage known as the Pre-Ludhamian.

== RAF Ludham ==
The airfield at Ludham was built by Richard Costain Ltd and became operational in November 1941 as a second satellite for the main fighter station at RAF Coltishall sited north of Norwich, three tarmac-covered concrete runways and ancillary buildings being built on the land which had belonged to Fritton Farm. A total of ten RAF fighter squadrons (eight flying various marks of Supermarine Spitfire and two flying the Hawker Typhoon 1b) were based here between December 1941 and July 1945.

== Film location ==
Ludham was one of the film locations for the 1954 movie Conflict of Wings starring John Gregson and Muriel Pavlow. Adapted from the novel by Don Sharp, the story takes place in a Norfolk country village where the locals decide to fight against a proposal to build an air-firing range on an island used as a bird sanctuary.

Filming took place in the village centre, and shows many buildings and features (including the Bakers Arms pub and the very narrow main road through the village) which no longer exist.

A photograph showing filming and more information about Ludham can be accessed at the Ludham Community Archive website.

== Windmills ==
Ludham has had several windmills. These were used for corn milling, oil milling and drainage.

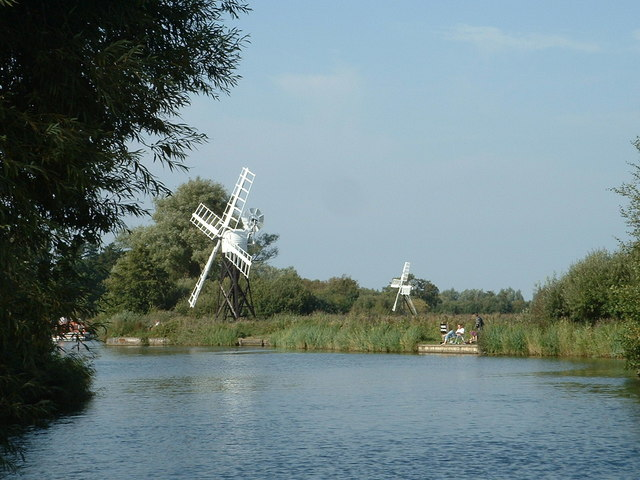
Boardman's and Clayrack

- Boardman's Windmill, an open framed smock mill for drainage. Built in the late 1800s and preserved by the Norfolk Windmills Trust.
- Beaumont's Mill, a tower mill for drainage. Built c.1802. Worked until at least 1937, demolished in the 1960s.
- Clayrack Drainage Mill, a hollow post mill moved from Ranworth in 1981. Preserved by the Norfolk Windmills Trust.
- High Mill, a tower mill for corn milling. Built in 1742 and worked until at least 1890. Reduced to a stump in 1975.
- Coldharbour Mill, a tower mill for drainage which had ceased working by 1935 and was subsequently demolished.
- Horsefen Mill, a tower mill for drainage. Built c.1800. Machinery dismantled in the 1950s or 1960s and subsequently demolished.

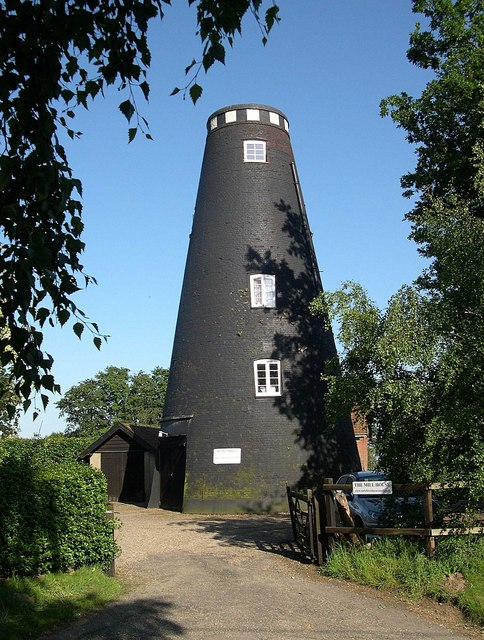
How Hill

- How Hill Mill, a tower mill for corn milling built in 1825 and worked until 1888. Now in residential use.
- Lovers Lane Mill (I), a post mill for corn milling. Standing in 1826 and blown down on 24 March 1895.
- Lovers Lane Mill (II), a post mill for corn milling. Built in 1895 and blown down on 24 March 1896.
- Lovers Lane Mill (III), a post mill for corn milling. Built in 1896 and blown down on 1 December 1897.
- Malthouse Lane Mill, a post mill for corn milling. Standing in 1800, demolished by 1821.

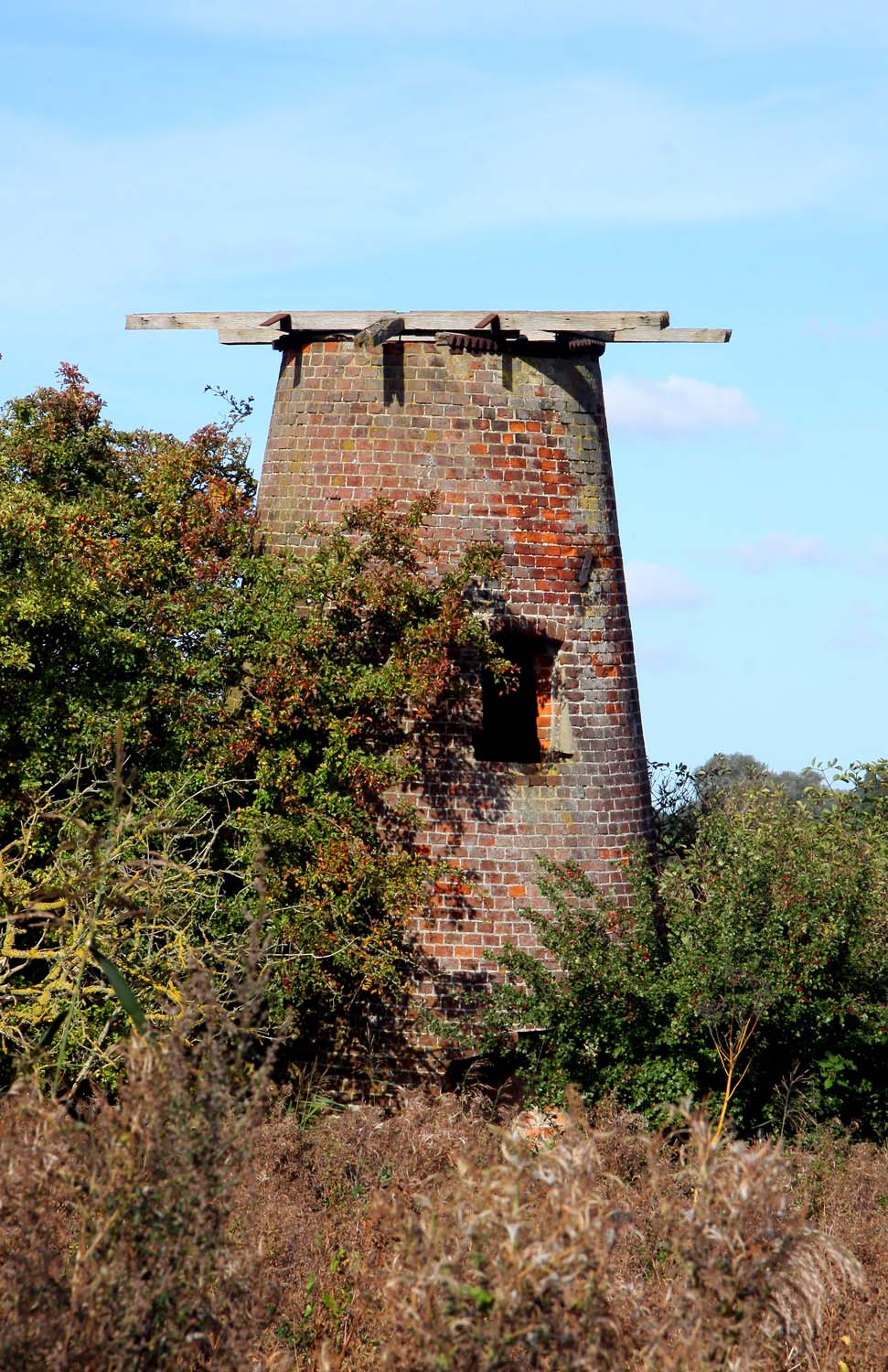
North Mill

- North Mill, a tower mill for drainage. Built by 1905 but had ceased working by 1934. The empty tower survives.
- South Mill, a trestle mill standing in the 1930s.

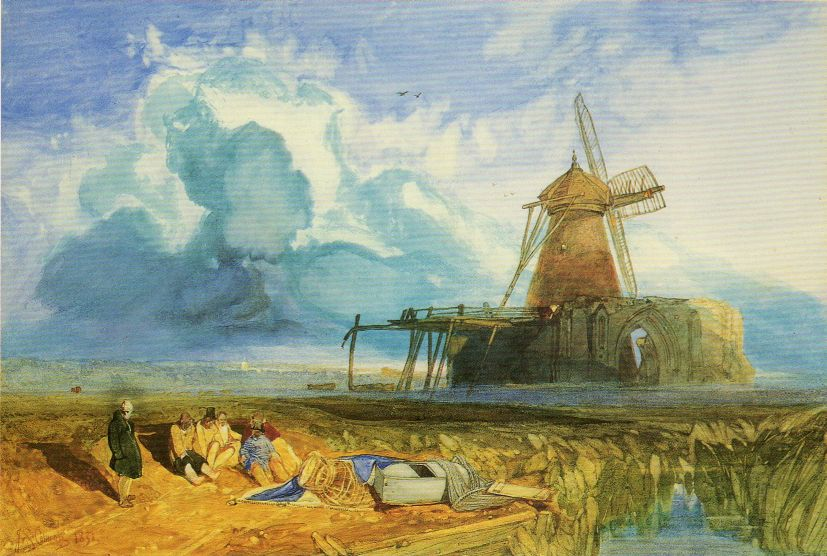
St Benets Abbey

- St Benet's Abbey Mill, a tower mill for crushing seeds for oil, later converted to a drainage mill. Built between 1728 and 1735. Cap and sails blown off in 1863, although the mill may have ceased working by then. The empty tower survives.

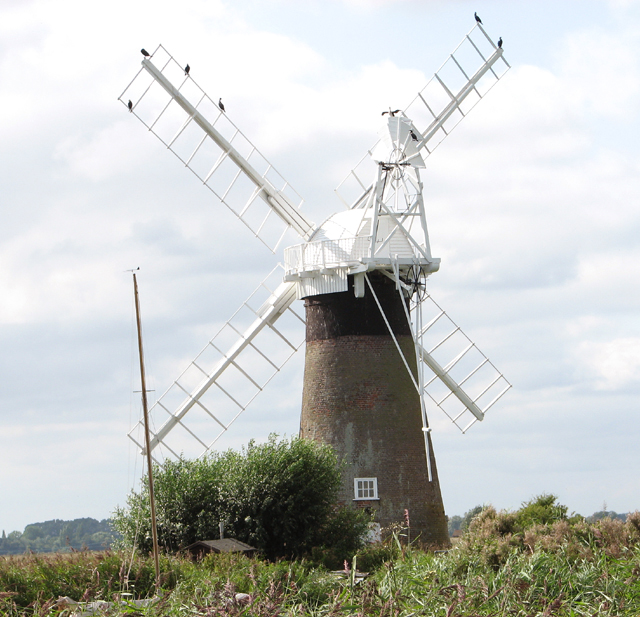
St Benets Level

- St Benet's Level Mill, a tower mill for drainage built c.1775. An American type iron windpump was erected on the tower in the second half of the Eighteenth century. This blew down in the 1890s and the mill was rebuilt as a conventional windmill. Preserved by the Crown Estates.
- Womack Water Mill, a tower mill for drainage which was derelict in 1950. The derelict mill stands today.
- Yarmouth Road Mill, a post mill for corn milling. Standing by 1620 and demolished in 1742.

== Notable residents ==
- John Johnson, clergyman and author, was born at Ludham.
- Edward Seago, the landscape artist, lived in the village at the Grade II listed Dutch House.
- Actors Athene Seyler and Nicholas "Beau" Hannen owned a country property in the village in the later years of their life.
- Kieron Williamson, the boy artist known as "mini Monet", lives locally with his family.

== Notes ==
- http://kepn.nottingham.ac.uk/map/place/Norfolk/Ludham
