= Stokesby Windmill =

Windmill in Stokesby, Norfolk, England

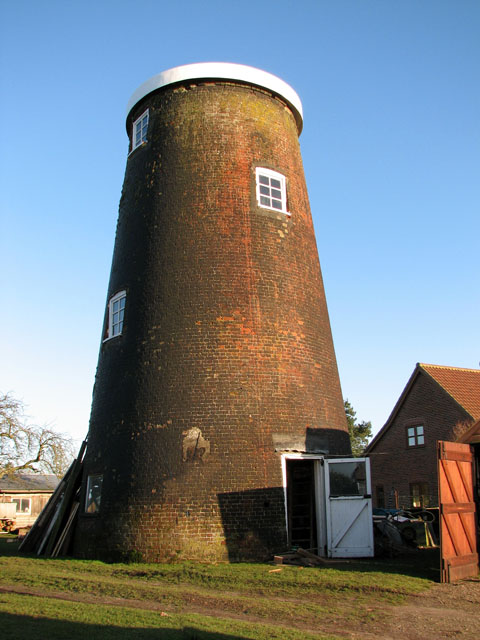
- Stokesby Windmill, January 2011
- Interactive map of Stokesby Windmill

Origin
- Mill name: Sokesby Windmill
- Mill location: Stokesby, Norfolk, United Kingdom
- Grid reference: TG 4295 1067
- Coordinates: 52°38′23″N 1°35′22″E
- Year built: 1826

Information
- Purpose: Corn mill
- Type: Tower mill
- Storeys: Four storeys
- No. of sails: Four
- Type of sails: Patent sails
- Windshaft: Cast iron
- Winding: Fantail
- Fantail blades: Eight
- Auxiliary power: Portable engine
- No. of pairs of millstones: Three pairs
- Size of millstones: 4 feet 0 inches (1.22 m) diameter

Stokesby Windmill, or Trett's Mill, is a Grade II listed tower mill in Stokesby, Norfolk, United Kingdom. It was built in the mid-1820s and worked until 1916. It later became derelict but has been conserved with most machinery remaining.

== History ==
Stokesby Windmill was built in 1826. The mill was offered for sale or to let in December 1829. It had two pairs of millstones. James Page was then the miller. Robert Ransome was the miller from 1836 to 1845. John Durrant was the miller in 1852, followed by George Durrant in 1853 and George Flowerdew from 1858 to 1860. A third pair of millstones had been installed by 1859. Thomas Capon was the miller from 1863 to 1872. He was declared bankrupt in May 1869, but obtained his discharge in July. Smithdales, the Norwich millwrights, fitted a new fantail to the mill in January 1873 at a cost of £14 15s 11d. Edward Mayhew was the miller from 1874 to 1878. He was at How Hill Mill, Ludham in 1879. The mill was sold by auction in October 1878 to James Fosdick. He had installed a steam engine as auxiliary power by 1888. The engine was a 7hp portable engine made by Holmes and Sons, the Norwich millwrights and ironfounders. Fosdick was in financial difficulties in 1889 and the mill was sold in March 1890 on the instruction of the mortgagees. The mill was sold to Elijah Trett, who installed his son Elijah Jr. as miller. Elijah Jr. was declared bankrupt in 1901, but continued to work the mill until 1916. Elijah Trett Sr. died in 1917 and the mill was offered for sale by auction, along with Halvergate Windmill, which he also owned.

The mill retained its cap in 1937, but it had been removed by July 1939. By January 1952, the tower had been roofed with a shedlike structure with a semi-circular roof. Arthur C. Smith surveyed the mill on 10 July 1973 and 25 May 1979. He describe the mill as a preserved tower with some machinery. The mill was listed Grade II on 4 December 1987. By 2025, the shedlike roof had been removed and the mill capped with a flat roof.

== Description ==
Stokesby Windmill is a four storey tower mill. The tower is about 38 feet (12 m) tall. It had a boat shape cap with a petticoat. Four double patent sails were carried on a cast iron windshaft. The sails had eight bays of three shutters. The mill was winded by an eight-bladed fantail. Three pairs of French Burr millstones were driven underdrift. The great spur wheel is wooden, as is the upright shaft. Two pairs of millstones survive.
