= Peafield Mill, New Lakenham =

Windmill in Norwich, Norfolk, England

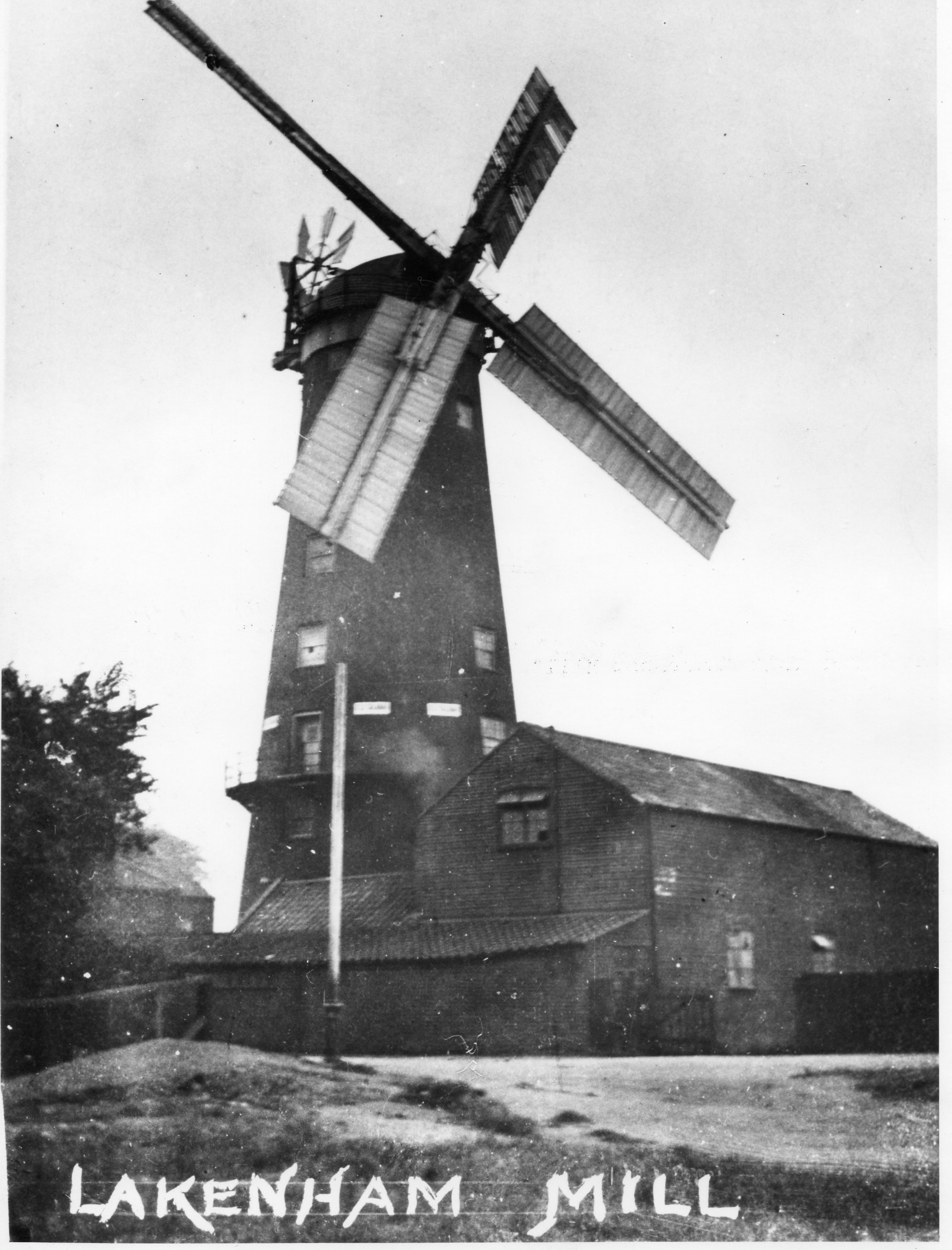
- Peafield Mill, 1896
- Interactive map of Peafield Mill, New Lakenham

Origin
- Mill name: Peafield Mill, Spratt's Mill
- Mill location: New Lakenham, Norwich, Norfolk, United Kingdom
- Grid reference: TG 2300 0735
- Coordinates: 52°37′04″N 1°17′35″E
- Year built: 1824

Information
- Purpose: Corn mill
- Type: Tower mill
- Storeys: Eight storeys
- No. of sails: Four
- Type of sails: Patent sails
- Windshaft: Cast iron
- Winding: Fantail
- Fantail blades: Six
- Auxiliary power: Steam engine, later electric motor
- No. of pairs of millstones: Three pairs
- Size of millstones: 4 feet 6 inches (1.37 m) diameter

Peafield Mill is a Grade II listed tower mill in New Lakenham, Norwich, Norfolk, United Kingdom. It was built in 1824 and worked by wind until 1914. The mill was worked by auxiliary power until 1965. It is one of the tallest windmills in the United Kingdom. The tower survives, converted to residential use.

== History ==
Peafield Mill was built in 1824 by Henry Lock, millwright of Bracondale, Norwich at a cost of £2,000. Thomas Spratt was the miller until 1833. He was followed by Charles Clare, who went to Bixley Windmill in 1838. James Faulke was the miller from 1839 to 1845. The mill was sold by auction in August 1845 to Barnabas Feltham. It was worked by his sons, Jonathan and Mark. Barnabas Feltham died in 1855 and the mill was offered for sale by auction that June.

It was not sold. The mill was again offered for sale in March 1856. Again, it did not sell. Barnabas Feltham Jr., who had been working Saxlingham Nethergate tower mill, took over. He worked the mill until his death in 1888. The mill lost its fantail in a gale on 27 January 1884. It landed in a house some 200 yards (180 m) away. Messrs. Fiddy & Smith were the next millers, with Robert Fiddy alone until 1905 when the mill was sold by auction. A steam engine had been installed as auxiliary power by then. Charles Edward Woodrow bought the mill, employing John Quantrill as miller. The mill worked by wind until 1914, when it was damaged by fire. The sails were removed in 1914 by Martin, millwright of Beccles, Suffolk. In 1920, an electrically powered roller mill was built alongside the mill. The mill retained its cap in 1932. The mill was worked until 1965, when C. E. Woodrow Ltd. was merged with R. J. Read Ltd. of the City Flour Mills, King Street, Norwich to form Read Woodrow Ltd. The mill was used as a store until 1970, when it was sold to Norwich Corporation and converted to residential use. It was listed Grade II on 5 June 1972.

== Description ==
Peafield Mill is an eight storey tower mill. The tower is 80 feet 0 inches (24.38 m) tall, beating Sutton Windmill which is only 67 feet 6 inches (20.57 m) tall and 79 feet 6 inches (24.23 m) to the top of the cap. It had a boat shaped cap with a petticoat and gallery. The cap was carried on a shot curb. Four double Patent sails were carried on a cast iron windshaft. One pair of sails had ten bays of three shutters, the other had eleven bays of three shutters. They had a span of 100 feet (30 m). The mill drove three pairs of 4 feet 6 inches (1.37 m) diameter French Burr millstones.
