= How Hill Mill, Ludham =

Mill building in Ludham, Norfolk, England

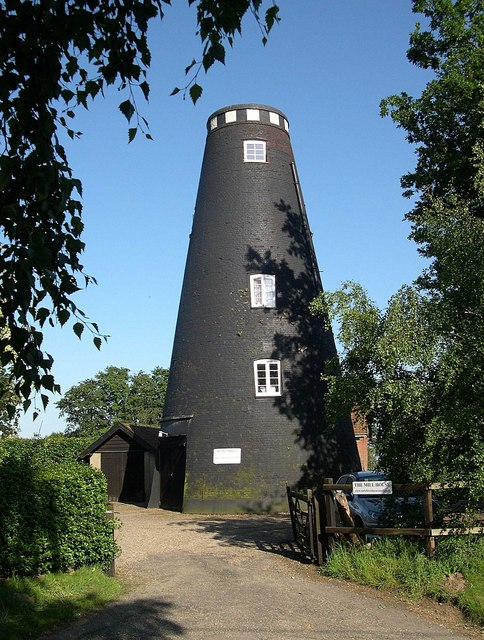
- How Hill Mill, May 2007
- Interactive map of How Hill Mill, Ludham

Origin
- Mill name: How Hill Mill
- Mill location: Ludham, Norfolk, United Kingdom
- Grid reference: TG 3734 1905
- Coordinates: 52°43′04″N 1°30′47″E
- Year built: 1825

Information
- Purpose: Corn mill
- Type: Tower mill
- Storeys: Five storeys
- No. of sails: Four
- Type of sails: Patent sails
- Windshaft: Cast iron
- Winding: Fantail
- Fantail blades: Six

How Hill Mill is a Grade II listed tower mill in Ludham, Norfolk, United Kingdom. It was built in 1825 and has been converted to residential use.

== History ==
How Hill Mill was built in 1825 by William Sherwood Page. John Page was the miller in 1835. James Pleasant was listed in the 1841 census as the miller. Also listed were George Cole, journeyman miller and Robert Gedge, Miller. James Page was the occupier in 1842 and miller in 1868. Edward Mayhew was the miller in 1879, having previously been at Stokesby Windmill. He was followed by W. A. Page, who died in 1888. The mill had apparently ceased work by 1900,, although Frederick Charles Chapman was listed as miller in the 1901 census. The mill was bought by Edward Boardman in 1902. He converted the mill to a water tower. Arthur C. Smith surveyed the mill on 15 and 29 May 1981. It had been converted for residential use by then. The mill was listed Grade II on 12 May 1987.

== Description ==
How Hill Mill is a five storey tower mill. The tower is 21 feet 6 inches (6.55 m) diameter at the base and 10 feet 0 inches (3.05 m) diameter at the curb. It had a boat shaped cap with a petticoat. A cast iron windshaft carried four double Patent sails, which had 7 bays. Six bays had three shutters and the innermost bay had four. The mill was winded by a six-blade fantail.
