= Halvergate Windmill =

Windmill in Halvergate, Norfolk, England

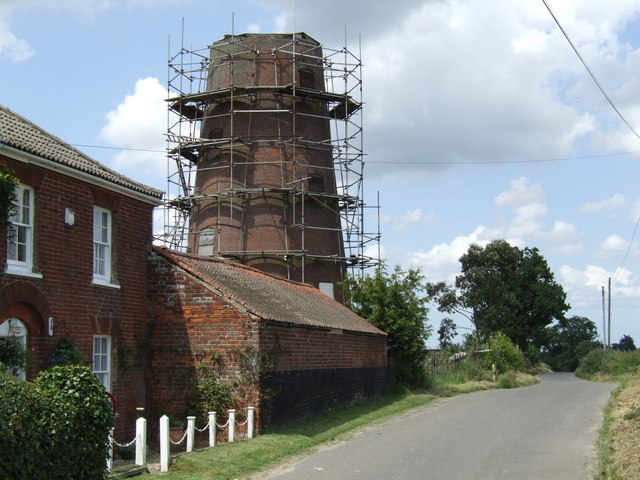
- Halvergate Windmill, June 2007
- Interactive map of Halvergate Windmill

Origin
- Mill name: Halvergate Windmill
- Mill location: Halvergate, Norfolk, United Kingdom
- Grid reference: TG 4160 0598
- Coordinates: 52.5978°N 1.5661°E
- Year built: 1866

Information
- Purpose: Corn mill
- Type: Tower mill
- Storeys: Six storey tower
- No. of sails: Four
- Type of sails: Patent sails
- Windshaft: Cast iron
- Winding: Fantail
- Fantail blades: Eight
- No. of pairs of millstones: Four pairs
- Size of millstones: 4 feet 10 inches (1.47 m) diameter

Halvergate Windmill is a tower mill in Halvergate, Norfolk, United Kingdom. It was built in 1866 and worked until 1935, when it was burnt out. The mill is subject to a protracted restoration effort. It is a Grade II listed building.

== History ==
The first windmill on the site was a post mill with a roundhouse, which was standing in 1734, when Ames Gresham was the miller. The mill was marked on Faden's 1797 map of Norfolk. Later millers were Benjamin King in 1802, Robert Bately in 1806, John Larter in 1817, James Rushmer Jr. (1819-36), Edward Rushmer (1845-46) and John Hewitt (1851-56). Jacob Crane bought the mill in 1858. He had the post mill replaced by a tower mill in 1866.

Crane was the miller until 1883, when he let the mill. Later millers were Elizabeth Martin in 1888, Jacob Thomas Crane (1890-92), Charles Jacob Mutten (1896-1900), John Woodcock in 1904, Benjamin Wright (1908-16) and Walter Benjamin Wright (1922-33). The mill was owned by Elijah Trett at his death 1917 and was put up for auction, along with Stokesby Windmill, which he also owned. The mill still had four sails in 1929, but was working on two in September 1934. The mill was tailwinded in the spring of 1935. The brake wheel caught fire, and the mill was burnt out. The tower had been given new windows and capped with a conical roof by October 1939. The ground floor of the mill was used as a store until 1976, when the roof blew off. Consideration was given in 1979 to recapping and restoring the mill, but this was decided to be too expensive a proposition. Scaffolding was erected around the mill c. 2003, as a restoration was intended, using machinery from South Ockendon Windmill, Essex, which had collaped in 1977. The mill was listed as Grade II on 28 February 1986. A new cap had been constructed by 2005. The mill was still surrounded by scaffolding in 2025; the cap had not then been placed on the mill.

== Description ==
Halvergate Windmill is a six storey tower mill, about 50 feet (15 m) tall. It had a boat shaped cap with a petticoat and a gallery. A cast iron windshaft carried four double patent sails. The outer pair of sails had ten bays of three shutters. The inner pair had nine bays; the outer eight bays had three shutters, the bay nearest the windshaft had four shutters on the leading edge and five on the trailing edge. The mill was winded by an eight-blade fantail. The mill drove four pairs of 4 feet 10 inches (1.47 m) diameter millstones and two flour dressers. The millstones came from Bixley Windmill when that mill was dismantled in 1865.
