= South Ockendon Windmill =

Windmill in South Ockendon, Essex, England

South Ockendon Mill
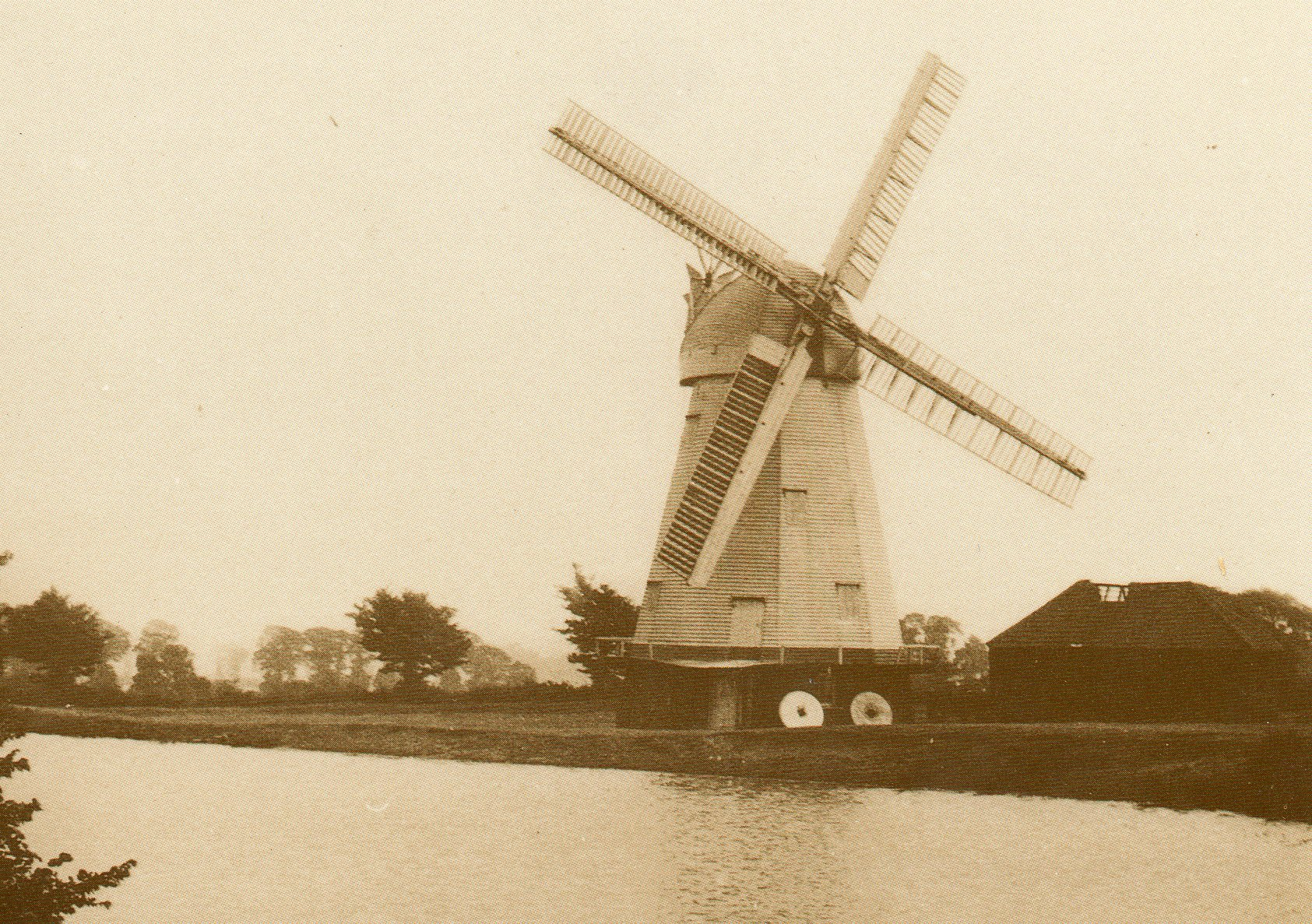
- The mill in working order c1900
- Interactive map of South Ockendon Mill

Origin
- Mill name: South Ockendon Mill
- Mill location: TQ 604,831
- Coordinates: 51°31′26″N 0°18′40″E
- Operator: Private
- Year built: 1820s

Information
- Purpose: Corn mill
- Type: Smock mill
- Storeys: Three-storey smock
- Base storeys: Two-storey base
- Smock sides: Eight-sided smock
- No. of sails: Four sails
- Type of sails: Patent sails
- Windshaft: Cast iron
- Winding: Fantail
- Fantail blades: Eight blades
- Auxiliary power: Steam Engine
- No. of pairs of millstones: Three pairs,
- Year lost: 1977
- Other information: A waterwheel drove one pair of millstones independent of the windmill

South Ockendon Windmill was a Smock mill at South Ockendon, Essex, England which collapsed on 2 November 1977.

== History ==
South Ockendon Windmill was built in the 1820s. A date of 1829 is often quoted but the mill was marked on the Greenwoods' map of 1825. The mill was a combined mill, with a waterwheel driving a pair of millstones in the base in addition to those driven by wind. The mill may have been built with the waterwheel from new. The first reference to the waterwheel was in 1845. In June 1853 the mill was struck by lightning. A steam engine had been installed by 1912 and the mill ceased working in 1923. The mill collapsed on 2 November 1977. The wreckage was taken into store at South Woodham Ferrers by Vincent Pargeter, millwright to Essex County Council. A plan to restore and exhibit some of the remains in South Ockendon was shelved in 1994. The remains are still in store, available to be used if a replica of the mill is ever built, either on its original site or elsewhere. In 2005, it was announced that some of the machinery was to be used in the restoration of Halvergate Windmill, Norfolk.

== Description ==
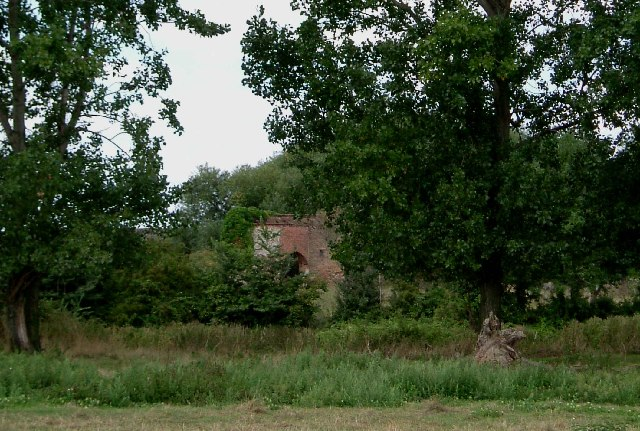
The remains of the mill base, August 2005

South Ockendon Windmill was a three-storey smock mill on a two-storey brick base, with a stage at first-floor level. The mill had two double Patent sails and two single Patent sails. The boat-shaped cap was winded by a fantail.

=== Mill ===
South Ockendon Windmill had an octagonal two-storey brick base, which consisted the ground floor of the mill and a cellar. It was 26 feet 4 inches (8.03 m) across the flats and 8 feet 4 inches (2.54 m) high. The cellar was just under 8 feet (2,438 mm) high. The mill was 58 feet (17.68 m) high overall, and 50 feet (15.24 m) from ground level to the top of the cap.

The smock was 30 feet 6 inches (9.30 m) from sill to curb. The mill was 16 feet 2 inches (4.93 m) diameter at the curb externally, the cant posts being about 11 inches (279 mm) by 11 1/2 inches (290 mm). The stage was at first-floor level, 8 feet 4 inches (2.54 m) above the ground.

The cap was boat-shaped, similar to those found on Norfolk windmills. Winding was by an eight-bladed fantail.

=== Sails and windshaft ===
South Ockendon Windmill had a cast-iron windshaft carrying two double Patent sails and two single Patent sails with a span of 64 feet (19.51 m). The double-shuttered sails had eleven bays of three shutters, and the single-shuttered sails had nine bays of three shutters.

=== Machinery ===
The wooden brake wheel was of composite construction, 9 feet 2 inches (2.79 m) diameter. It had a wooden rim and a cast-iron centre with six arms. It had been converted from clasp arm construction. The Wallower was wooden, as was the Upright Shaft. The Upright Shaft was made up of four pieces of timber. The clasp arm Great Spur Wheel was of wood. It drove three pairs of underdrift millstones, with a fourth pair being driven by the waterwheel. The wind-driven millstones were all French Burr stones, two pairs being 4 feet (1.22 m) diameter and the third pair being 4 feet 10 inches (1.47 m) diameter. Little is known about the waterwheel except that it was undershot and drove a single pair of millstones on the first floor of the mill, which was the same floor as the wind powered millstones.

=== Fantail ===
South Ockendon Windmill was winded by an eight-bladed fantail Final drive was a wooden worm gear driving onto cogs of 9 inches (229 mm) pitch at the top of the smock.

== Millers ==
- William Eve 1820 – 1829
- Thomas Banks 1845
- Thomas Bennett Sturgeon 1848
- Stephen Challis 1877
- Smith c1877 – 1919
- C and William Sturgeon 1912 – 1914
