= Stokesby with Herringby =

Civil parish in Norfolk, England

Coordinates: 52.63864°N 1.59155°E

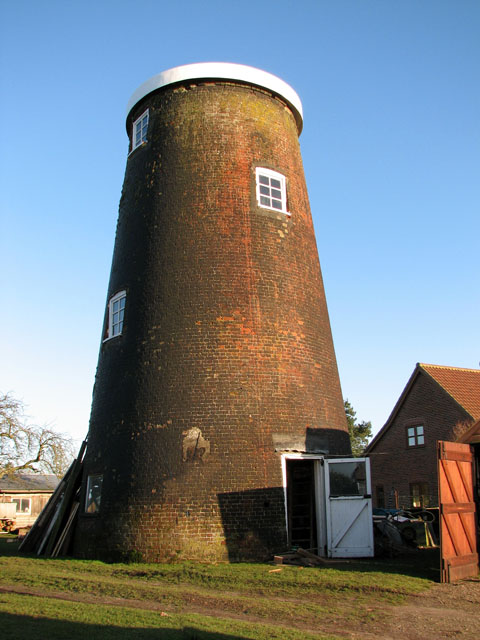
- Stokesby Windmill

- Location within Norfolk
- Area: 8.61 km^{2} (3.32 sq mi)
- Population: 330 (2011)
  - Density: 38/km^{2} (98/sq mi)
- OS grid reference: TG 431 106
- Civil parish: Stokesby with Herringby
- District: Great Yarmouth
- Shire county: Norfolk
- Region: East
- Country: England
- Sovereign state: United Kingdom
- Post town: GREAT YARMOUTH
- Postcode district: NR29
- Police: Norfolk
- Fire: Norfolk
- Ambulance: East of England

Stokesby with Herringby is a civil parish in the English county of Norfolk. It comprises the village of Stokesby and the surrounding rural area. It is situated on the banks of the River Bure, some 10 km west of the town of Great Yarmouth and 25 km east of the city of Norwich.

The civil parish has an area of 8.61 km² and in the 2001 census had a population of 293 in 116 households, the population increasing to 330 at the 2011 census. For the purposes of local government, the parish falls within the district of Great Yarmouth.

== Windmills ==
There are three windmills in Stokesby, a corn mill and two drainage mills. All three are tower mills.

- Trett's Mill is a corn mill built in 1826. It worked until 1917. The mill has been preserved, retaining some of its machinery.
- Commission Mill is a drainage mill built in the 1800s. It was working c.1929. The empty tower survives, converted to residential accommodation.
- Old Hall Mill is a drainage mill built in the 19th century. It was working in 1930. A derelict empty tower survives.
