= Bixley Windmill =

Windmill in Bixley, Norfolk, England

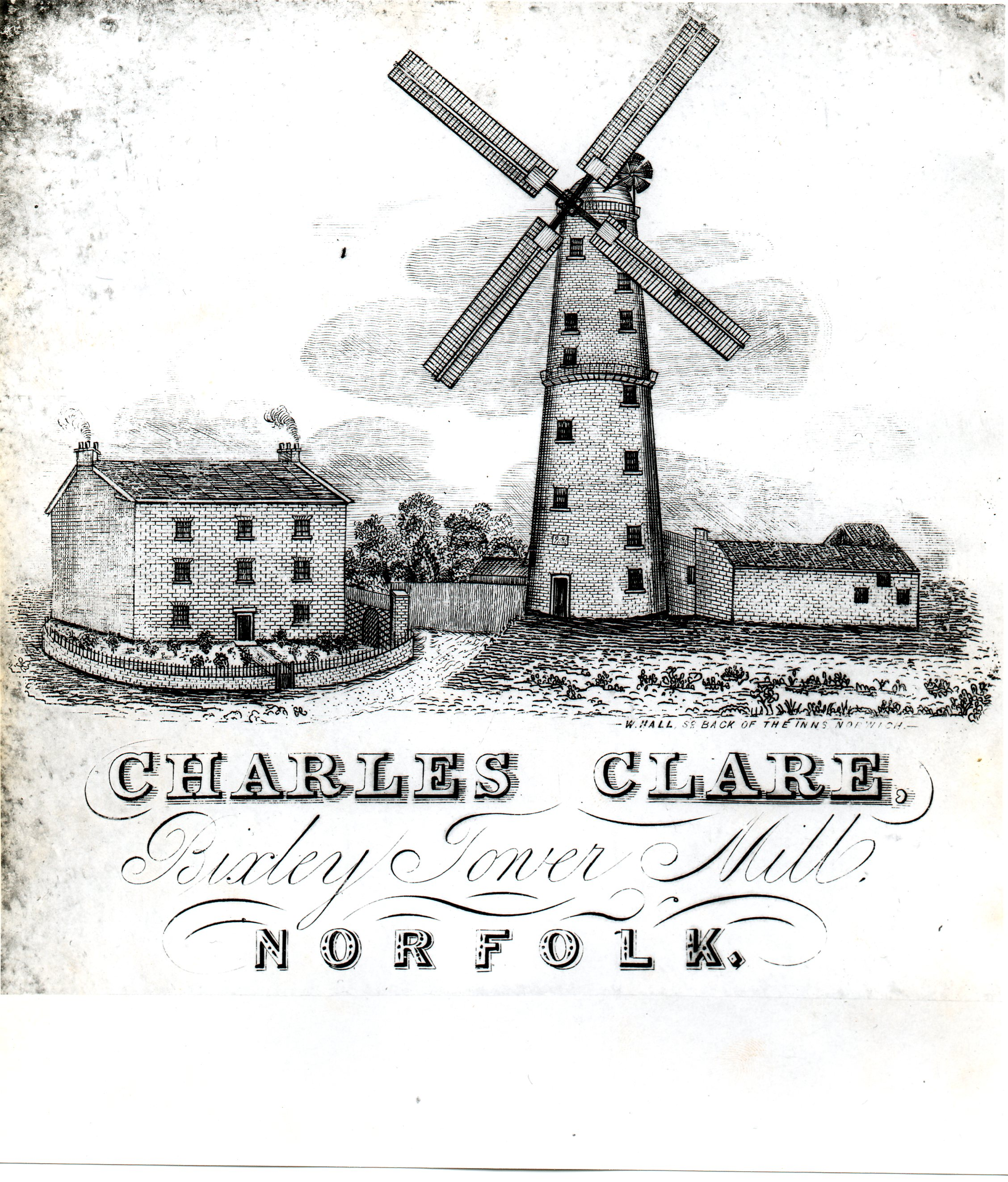
- Bixley Windmill
- Interactive map of Bixley Windmill

Origin
- Mill name: Bixley Windmill
- Mill location: Bixley, Norfolk, United Kingdom
- Grid reference: TG 2560 0617
- Coordinates: 52°36′22″N 1°19′48″E
- Year built: 1838

Information
- Purpose: Corn mill
- Type: Tower mill
- Storeys: Eleven storeys
- No. of sails: Four
- Type of sails: Patent sails
- Windshaft: Cast iron
- Winding: Fantail
- Auxiliary power: Steam engine
- No. of pairs of millstones: Five pairs, plus four pair driven by steam
- Size of millstones: Four pairs were 4 feet 10 inches (1.47 m) diameter.
- Year lost: 1865
- Other information: Windshaft had a cross, not a poll end, similar to those found in Lincolnshire, Yorkshire and other northern counties.

Bixley Windmill is a Grade II listed tower mill in Bixley, Norfolk, England, which may have been the tallest windmill built in the United Kingdom. It was built in 1838 and dismantled in 1865. A seven storey stump of the eleven storey tower survives, latterly used as a water tower.

== History ==
Bixley Windmill was marked on Faden's 1797 map of Norfolk. It was a smock mill. Thomas Foulger was the owner in 1799. The mill was for sale in 1805, when William Foulger was the miller. Foulger was still the miller in 1806 when the mill was again offered for sale. Robert Crane bought the mill, working it until his death in 1835. At that time, Charles Clare was the miller. Clare bought the mill. He also ran Peafield Mill, New Lakenham. John Clare took over as miller.

The smock mill was demolished and replaced by an eleven storey tower mill in spring 1838. At about 137 feet (42 m) to the top of the cap, the mill may have been the tallest in the United Kingdom, although a thirteen storey windmill with five sails was advertised for sale at Pickering, Yorkshire in 1841. The tallest known windmill was the High Mill, Southtown, Great Yarmouth, Norfolk, which was 122 feet (37 m) to the top of the cap. Charles Clare worked Bixley Windmill for its entire existence as a windmill, latterly with the assistance of his son, Charles. In 1851, John Gregory Buttifant, the Norwich millwright quoted to supply a new flour machine for £55 11/-. The mill was struck by lightning on 23 May 1854. A new sail was required. Thomas Smithdale, who had taken over from John Gregory Buttifant, made a new sail and fitted it for £62. The windmill drove five pairs of millstones. A steam mill was built onto the tower in 1857. Smithdale supplied the steam engine. It was a 8hp horizontal engine with a cylinder of 9 inches (23 cm) bore and 20 inches (51 cm) stroke. The engine had an 8 feet (2 m) diameter flywheel. Steam was supplied by a Cornish boiler 4 feet 0 inches (122 cm) diameter and 12 feet 0 inches (366 cm) long. Smithdale supplied a cistern to the mill in December 1860 for £12 10/-. It drove four pairs of millstones. The lease expired in 1865 and the mill was offered for sale several times.

In August 1865, the machinery of the mill was offered for sale by auction. Four pairs of millstones were bought by Jacob Crane and subsequently installed in Halvergate Windmill. The steam engine then offered for sale was rated at 10hp. The tower was reduced by four storeys. The materials removed were offered for sale by auction in October 1865. The mill formed part of the Crown Point Estate. In 1870, its owner, Sir Robert John Harvey Harvey, partner in Harveys & Hudson Bank, which had failed, shot and killed himself. The Crown Point Estate was offered for sale by auction in July 1872. The estate was sold to Jeremiah James Colman. The mill and mill house were sold to George Lovick Colman for £840. Colman sold the mill to Samuel Base in 1873. He sold the mill later that year to Jeremiah James Colman. The tower had been converted for use as a water tower by 1926. The mill was listed Grade II on 8 July 1980.

== Description ==
Bixley Windmill was an eleven storey tower mill. The tower is 43 feet 0 inches (13.11 m) diameter at the base with walls 3 feet 6 inches (1.07 m) thick. It was about 112 feet (34 m) tall. It had a boat shaped cap with a gallery. Four double Patent sails were carried on a cast iron windshaft, which had a cross to mount the sails, which were carried on half stocks 40 feet 0 inches (12.19 m) long. The sails were 39 feet 0 inches (11.89 m) long and 8 feet 0 inches (2.44 m) wide. They had a span of about 112 feet (34 m). The upright shaft was 14 inches (360 mm) square or diameter. The mill was winded by a six-blade fantail. Five pairs of French Burr millstones were driven. The mill was about 122 feet (37 m) tall to the top of the cap.
