= Nip & Tuck =

Nip & Tuck were a DJ and producer collaboration between two brothers Neill and Ian Watson (aka Angmo and Gwilo). The duo first DJed together at Ministry of Sound in 2001. Their first dance production Now I Found You was released on vinyl 12" in 2002 The duo are most well known for their remix of Dawnay U Touch Me (Nip & Tuck's Funky Facelift)(WEA/ Eternal/Warner Music UK) Dawnay U Touch Me was a no. 1 single in South Africa for 22 weeks in 2001.

== Discography ==
=== 12" UK ETERNAL SAM00675 (2002) ===
- U Touch Me (Live Mix) 4.34
- U Touch Me (Almighty Mix) 7.53
- U Touch Me (Xenomania Club Mix) 6.27
- U Touch Me (Nip & Tucks Funky Facelift) 6.09

=== UK CD SAM00675 (2002) ===
- U Touch Me (Live Mix) 4.34
- U Touch Me (Almighty Mix) 7.53
- U Touch Me (Xenomania Club Mix) 6.27
- U Touch Me (Supafly Dub) 6.46
- U Touch Me (Nip & Tucks Funky Facelift) 6.09

=== UK 12" Promo ===
A: Nip & Tuck - Now I Found You B: Now I Found You (Tribal Remix)
