= Moneyhelpline =

Price comparison service

Fundraising Innovations Ltd TA moneyhelpline.com
- Company type: Limited company
- Industry: Price comparison service
- Founded: 2002
- Headquarters: Kent, United Kingdom
- Area served: United Kingdom
- Key people: Paul Green (CEO); Jay Manek (CCO); Mark Todd (CMO)
- Website: Moneyhelpline.com

Moneyhelpline.com was an independent price comparison service which provided consumers with free, impartial advice on a variety of financial products including credit cards, mortgages, loans and a range of insurance types.

It stopped trading in 2018 after its parent company Fundraising Innovations was taken over by private equity company, Inflexion Capital Partners LLB.

== Business model ==
moneyhelpline's comparison services were powered by Beatthatquote at first and then later by Lovemoney.com, Seopa and The Broker Team, other comparison providers. moneyhelpline made money by earning commission from each customer who took out a financial product through them, making the service free to the consumer.

== Company history ==
The company was founded in 2002 as Fundraising Innovations Ltd trading as switchandgive.com and stopped providing services in 2018.

moneyhelpline was one of a group of web properties owned by Fundraising Innovations Ltd, which also includes energyhelpline – comparing gas and electricity tariffs and heating insurance, greenhelpline – comparing green energy solutions, and firsthelpline – comparing broadband and home phone services.

Of these, as of 2022, only energyhelpline continues to trade.

Over £100,000 has been donated to charities through switchandgive.com.
