= Appz Magazine =

Appz magazine
- Logo of the magazine
- Editor: Jack Himeys
- Categories: Technology magazine
- Frequency: Bi-monthly
- Founded: 2002
- Company: LFD Communications
- Country: United Kingdom
- Based in: London
- Language: English
- Website: www.appzmag.com

Appz Magazine identifies emerging technologies and analyzes their impact for technology and business leaders—the senior executives, entrepreneurs, venture capitalists, engineers, developers, and researchers who create and fund the innovations that drive the global economy. Appz Magazine is an independent media company that is owned by LFD Communications and published in the United Kingdom. The magazine was established in 2002 and is mainly a print magazine with a minimal online presence. LFD Communications owns several independent media companies across the world.

== Publication ==
Appz Magazine was founded as a supplement to LFD Communications other publications in 2002 by Jack Himeys and provided a bi-monthly alternative to The London Gazette. Appz Magazine's publishing office is located in London, United Kingdom with a U.S. satellite office in New York, NY. LFD communications is run by over 50 staff members.

== Circulation ==
The magazine in its peak in early 2003 reached over 2 million subscribers. As more and more magazines decide to use the Internet to convey news, then this has lowered the circulation of Appz Magazine's print editions.
