= Kieron Williamson =

English artist (born 2002)

- Born: 4 August 2002 (age 23); Essex, England
- Known for: Watercolourist

Kieron Williamson (born 4 August 2002) is a watercolour, oil and pastel artist from Holt, Norfolk in England. His paintings and ability by the age of six have caused considerable interest in the UK media and are notable for his advanced use of perspective and shading.

== Biography ==
He has been described as a prodigy, and at his second exhibition in 2009, his paintings sold out in 14 minutes, raising a total of £18,200 for 16 paintings. A subsequent exhibition in Holt in July 2010 saw his paintings all sold within 30 minutes, at a total value of £150,000.

The following week, on Friday, 6 August 2010, Williamson revealed on the BBC Norfolk website some of his latest paintings that would be exhibited in 2011.

At the beginning of November 2010, the family revealed to the Eastern Daily Press that they might re-locate to Cornwall to further Kieron's painting, but in the event the family bought a new home at Ludham, east of Norwich, in Kieron's name, with the proceeds of his art sales. In November 2011, a further 33 paintings were sold in 10 minutes for £100,000, including an impression of Istanbul's Süleymaniye Mosque for £15,595. In July 2013, earnings from sales amounted to almost £2 million, when sales in successive weeks raised £242,000 for 23 paintings, and £210,000 for 12 paintings.

In 2013, as Kieron Williamson, aged 10, had made an estimated £1,500,000 from his paintings, the BBC featured a story called "Art prodigy poses 'ethical nightmare' for parents".

As of 2025, Williamson still paints and plans to have an exhibition of his paintings in Summer 2025. In addition to landscape painting, Williamson also paints equestrianism and still lifes, citing Edward Seago and Alfred Munnings as strong influences in his work.
