= Jack Topping =

English chorister (born 2002)

- Born: 2002 (age 23–24); Wigan, England
- Genres: Classical music
- Occupation: Singer
- Years active: 2013—present
- Label: Unknown

Jack Topping (born c. 2002) is an English chorister who came to public attention during 2013 for his solo vocal performances. Topping comes from Liverpool and is a member of the choir of Liverpool Metropolitan Cathedral. He released his debut studio album Wonderful World in November 2013.

== Music career ==
=== 2013: Wonderful World ===
In September 2013 he became the youngest person to be signed up by Decca Records, beating the record previously held by 12-year-old Isobel Suckling. Decca's president Dickon Stainer described Topping as "the Gareth Bale of choristers". Topping's first EP Introducing Jack: The Classical EP was released on 18 October 2013 by Decca Records. On 29 November 2013 he released his first studio album Wonderful World, the album peaked at number 73 on the UK Albums Chart. On 13 December 2013, he released his first single, a cover version of the song "Tomorrow" from the musical Annie, the official campaign song for the charity Save the Children, for which Topping was appointed an ambassador.

The Paris Boys Choir, also known in France as Les Petits Chanteurs de Sainte-Croix de Neuilly, sang with Topping on this recording of a French song, "Caresse sur l'Océan".

== Discography ==
=== Extended plays ===
Title	EP details
Introducing Jack: The Classical EP	Released: 18 October 2013; Label: Decca Records; Format: Digital download, CD

=== Albums ===
Title	Album details	Peak chart positions
Title	Album details	UK
Wonderful World	Released: 29 November 2013; Label: Decca Records; Format: Digital download, CD	73

=== Singles ===
Year	Title	Album
2013	"Tomorrow"	Wonderful World
