= Michael Camille =

Professor of Medieval history and art (1958–2002)

- Born: Michael William Camille; 6 March 1958; Keighley, Yorkshire, England
- Died: 29 April 2002 (aged 44)
- Occupations: Art historian; academic

Academic background
- Education: Peterhouse, Cambridge (MA, PhD)

Michael William Camille (6 March 1958 – 29 April 2002) was a British art historian and academic, who was an influential, provocative scholar and historian of medieval art and specialist of the European Middle Ages. He was Mary L. Block Professor at the University of Chicago.

== Life ==
Michael Camille was born in Keighley, Yorkshire, on 6 March 1958. He attended Oakbank Grammar School, Keighley, and studied English and Art History at Peterhouse, Cambridge, graduating with a first class honours degree in 1980 and with a Doctor of Philosophy (PhD) degree in 1985. His doctoral thesis was titled "The illustrated manuscripts of Guillaume de Deguileville's 'Pelerinages', 1330-1426".

Immediately after obtaining his doctorate he began work at the University of Chicago, where he remained for the rest of his short career. He was best known for applying post-structuralist ideas to questions of medieval art history. In 1996 he visited Medieval Times with Ira Glass for a segment of This American Life. In 2001 he was awarded a Guggenheim Fellowship.

He died of a brain tumor on 29 April 2002. The Michael Camille Essay Prize was established in his honour, for his brilliance in art history.

== Legacy ==
The New York Times obituary of Michael Camille stated that "Mr. Camille was noted for bringing contemporary critical theory and social perspectives to the study of medieval art. Using anthropological, psychoanalytic, semiotic and other approaches, as well as traditional art historical methods, he described the Middle Ages as a time of complex social and political ferment with similarities to modern experience." Camille's new approach marked "a departure from the more popular conception of the period as a remote and static 'age of faith.'''

The journal Gesta noted that "Camille's first article in the English journal Art History (1985) brought him immediate attention." Camille applied himself to "the traditional field of medieval manuscript illumination," but with new perspectives.

The University of Chicago Library, Hanna Holburn Gray Special Collections Research Center, presented an exhibit based on Michael Camille's book titled Image on the Edge: The Margins of Medieval Art. The exhibit is titled On the Edge: Medieval Margins and the Margins of Academic Life. The exhibit coincided with the publication of Camille's book, twenty years after its publication, which was first published in London.

His work, observed The Guardian newspaper in London, has been translated into "Spanish, French, Japanese, and Korean," and his book Image on the Edge "was reviewed by publications ranging from the Burlington Magazine to the Wall Street Journal."

== Works ==
- The Gothic Idol: Ideology and Image-Making in Medieval Art (New York: Cambridge University Press, 1989). ISBN 978-0521424301
- Image on the Edge (Cambridge, Mass.: Harvard University Press, 1992). ISBN 978-1789140064
- Master of Death: The Lifeless Art of Pierre Remiet, Illuminator (New Haven: Yale University Press, 1996). ISBN 978-0300064575
- Gothic Art: Glorious Visions (New York: Abrams, 1996). ISBN 978-0135701775
- Mirror in Parchment: The Luttrell Psalter and the Making of Medieval England (Chicago: University of Chicago Press, 1998). ISBN 978-0226092409
- The Medieval Art of Love: Objects and Subjects of Desire (New York: Abrams, 1998). ISBN 978-0810915442
- "Before the Gaze: The Internal Senses and Late Medieval Practices of Seeing." In Visuality Before and Beyond the Renaissance: Seeing as Others Saw (Cambridge and New York: Cambridge University Press, 2000): 197–223. ISBN 978-0521652223
- The Gargoyles of Notre-Dame: Medievalism and the Monsters of Modernity (Chicago: University of Chicago Press, 2009). ISBN 978-0226092454
