= 2002 in England =

- Centuries: 19th; 20th; 21st
- Decades: 1980s; 1990s; 2000s; 2010s; 2020s
- See also: 2001–02 in English football 2002–03 in English football 2002 in the United Kingdom; Other events of 2002

Events from 2002 in England

== Incumbent ==
- Monarch - Elizabeth II
- Prime Minister - Tony Blair

== Events ==
- 15 February – Funeral of Princess Margaret, Countess of Snowdon takes place at St. George's Chapel, Windsor.
- 19 February – Ford ends 90 years of British car production with the loss of more than 2,000 jobs after the last Fiesta was made at its factory in Dagenham. However, the plant will be retained for the production of engines and gearboxes, and Ford will continue to make commercial vehicles at its plant in Southampton.
- 20 February – Andrew Aston, a 29-year-old Birmingham cocaine addict, is sentenced to 26 concurrent terms of Life imprisonment – officially the longest prison sentence imposed on any criminal in England and Wales – for murdering two elderly people in robberies and attacking 24 others.
- 27 February – Ryanair Flight 296 catches fire at London Stansted Airport.
- 21 March – Amanda Dowler, 13, goes missing on her way home from school in Surrey.
- 22 March – A woman known as "Miss B", who was left quadriplegic last year as a result of a burst blood vessel in her neck, is granted the right to die by the High Court.
- 9 April – Funeral of Queen Elizabeth The Queen Mother takes place at Westminster Abbey, London. The burial takes place at St. George's Chapel, Windsor.
- 23 April – A badly decomposed female body is found in the River Thames; it is feared to be that of Amanda Dowler.
- 24 April – The body found in the River Thames is identified as that of 73-year-old Mrs Maisie Thomas, who was last seen alive near her home in Shepperton just over a year ago and whose death is not believed to be suspicious.
- 25 April – Two 16-year-old twin brothers are cleared of murdering 10-year-old Damilola Taylor, who was stabbed to death in South London 17 months ago.
- 29 April – As part of her Golden Jubilee celebrations, the Queen dines at 10 Downing Street with the five living prime ministers who have served under her; Tony Blair, John Major, Margaret Thatcher, James Callaghan and Edward Heath. She is also joined by several relatives of deceased former prime ministers, including Clarissa Eden, Countess of Avon, widow of prime minister Anthony Eden.
- 4 May – Arsenal win the FA Cup with a 2–0 win over London rivals Chelsea in the final.
- 8 May – Arsenal win their second double in five seasons (and the third in their history) after a 1–0 away win over defending champions Manchester United.
- 10 May
  - Potters Bar rail crash in Hertfordshire kills 7 people.
  - £5 million-rated striker Marlon King, of Gillingham F.C., is jailed for 18 months after being found guilty of handling a stolen £32,000 car.
- 27 May – Former leader of the Liberal Democrats Paddy Ashdown appointed as the international community's High Representative for Bosnia and Herzegovina.
- 28 May – Stephen Byers resigns as Secretary of State for Transport.
- 2 June – The England national football team's World Cup campaign, hosted jointly by Japan and South Korea, begins with a 1–1 draw against Sweden.
- 3 June – The "Party in the Palace" takes place at Buckingham Palace, London for The Queen's Golden Jubilee celebrations.
- 4 June – The Queen and The Duke of Edinburgh ride in the gold state coach from Buckingham Palace to St Paul's Cathedral for a special service marking the Queen's 50 years on the throne. In New York City, the Empire State Building is lit in purple for her honour.
- 7 June – England beat Argentina 1-0 in their second World Cup group game, with the only goal of the game being scored by captain David Beckham.
- 10 June – First direct electronic communication experiment between the nervous systems of two humans carried out by Kevin Warwick in the University of Reading.
- 12 June – England qualify for the knockout stages of the World Cup despite only managing a goalless draw against Nigeria.
- 15 June – England beat Denmark 3-0 in the World Cup second round and reach the quarter-finals for the first time since 1990. Ironically, the far-right British National Party had declared its support for all-white Denmark before the World Cup due to the England team featuring black players.
- 21 June – England's hopes of winning the World Cup are ended by a 2–1 defeat to Brazil in the quarter-finals.
- 25 June – Jason Gifford (27) is shot dead by armed police in Aylesbury after brandishing a shotgun and a machete in a residential street.
- July – London City Hall is opened on the south bank of the River Thames, designed by Norman Foster.
- 1 July – Rochdale Canal, crossing the Pennines, reopened throughout for leisure traffic.
- 5 July – The Imperial War Museum North in Manchester, designed by Daniel Libeskind, opens.
- 8 July – John Taylor, a 46-year-old parcel delivery worker from Bramley in Leeds, is sentenced to life imprisonment for the murder of 16-year-old Leanne Tiernan. Leanne was last seen alive in the city centre on 26 November 2000 and her body was found in the Yorkshire countryside nine months later. Police believed that Taylor may have been responsible for other unsolved sex attacks and murders in the Yorkshire area, and the trial judge has warned Taylor to expect to spend the rest of his life in prison.
- 12 July – Ribble Link waterway opened for leisure traffic.
- 13 July – Baltic Centre for Contemporary Art opens in the converted Baltic Flour Mill at Gateshead.
- 22 July – Rio Ferdinand becomes the most expensive player in English football when he completes his £29.1million move from Leeds United to Manchester United.
- 23 July – Rowan Williams, Archbishop of Wales, elected to be the successor of George Carey as Archbishop of Canterbury.
- 25 July – The Commonwealth Games, hosted by Manchester are opened by the Queen. The event also marks the opening of the City of Manchester Stadium, which will host the games. It will be partly remodelled after the games are over in order to become home of Manchester City F.C. from August 2003.
- August – An outbreak of Legionnaires' disease in Barrow-in-Furness results in seven deaths and 172 cases throughout the month, ranking it as the worst in the UK's history and 5th worst worldwide.
- 4 August – 10-year-old girls Holly Wells and Jessica Chapman go missing in Soham, Cambridgeshire.
- 5 August – Police and volunteers in the Soham area begin the search for Holly Wells and Jessica Chapman.
- 7 August – Police investigating the case of the two missing Soham girls seize a white van in nearby Wentworth and admit they are now looking at the case as a possible abduction.
- 12 August – A possible sighting of Holly Wells and Jessica Chapman is reported by a local taxi driver who claims to have seen the driver of a green car struggling with two children and driving recklessly along the A142 into Newmarket on the evening the girls went missing.
- 13 August – Two mounds of disturbed earth are found at Warren Hill, near Newmarket, in the same area where screams were reported on the night that Holly Wells and Jessica Chapman went missing. It is initially feared that the mounds of earth were the graves of the two girls, but a police examination fails to uncover any link to the girls.
- 16 August – Ian Huntley, caretaker of Soham Village College, and his girlfriend Maxine Carr, are questioned in connection with the disappearance of Holly Wells and Jessica Chapman, but are released after seven hours in custody.
- 17 August – Following the recovery of items of major interest to the police investigation, Ian Huntley and Maxine Carr are re-arrested on suspicion of murder as police admit for the first time that they fear the missing girls are now dead. Several hours later, two "severely decomposed and partially skeletonised" bodies are found in the Lakenheath area; they have not been identified but police say that they are likely to be those of the two missing girls.
- 21 August – Ian Huntley, detained under the Mental Health Act, is charged with the murders of Holly Wells and Jessica Chapman. His girlfriend Maxine Carr is charged with perverting the course of justice. Both are remanded in custody. Meanwhile, police confirm that the two bodies found at Lakenheath are those of the two girls.
- 20 September – Police confirm that human remains found in woodland in north Hampshire are those of Amanda Dowler, who went missing in Surrey six months ago. A murder investigation is launched.
- 22 September – An earthquake in Dudley is felt throughout England and Wales.
- 1 October – Main provisions of National Health Service Reform and Health Care Professions Act (of 25 June) come into force in England, including renaming and merger of existing regional health authorities, to form 28 new strategic health authorities, and introduction of primary care trusts to be responsible for the supervision of family health care functions.
- 9 October – A judge decides that Ian Huntley is fit to face prosecution for the Soham Murders.
- 23 October – Estelle Morris resigns as Secretary of State for Education, explaining that she did not feel up to the job.
- 25 October – Memorial service held at St Paul's Cathedral for the victims of the Bali bombing, which killed 26 UK citizens.
- 1 November – Diana, Princess of Wales' former butler, Paul Burrell, is cleared of stealing from the princess's estate after it was revealed that he had told The Queen that he was keeping some of her possessions.
- 15 November – Moors Murderer Myra Hindley dies in West Suffolk Hospital at the age of 60 after being hospitalised with a heart attack. She was in the 37th year of her life sentence and had spent the last decade attempting to gain parole despite being told by no less than four Home Secretaries that she would have to spend the rest of her life in prison. Her death comes at a time when the politicians who gradually increased Hindley's tariff from 25 years to 30 years and then to "whole life" are expected to be stripped of their power to set minimum terms for life sentence prisoners.
- 20 November
  - German anatomist Gunther von Hagens conducts a public autopsy in a London theatre; the first in Britain in more than 170 years.
  - 40 years after the first James Bond film was made, the 20th film is released in British cinemas as Pierce Brosnan bows out as Bond in Die Another Day after four films in seven years.
- 23 November – The Miss World beauty competition is held in London after rioting in the Nigerian capital Lagos prevent it being hosted there.
- 24 November – Home Secretary David Blunkett rules that four convicted child murderers should spend at least 50 years in prison before being considered for parole. This ruling means that Roy Whiting, Howard Hughes, Timothy Morss and Brett Tyler are likely to remain behind bars until at least the ages of 92, 80, 79 and 81 respectively.
- 26 November – Politicians in England and Wales lose their power to set minimum terms on life sentence prisoners after the European Court of Human Rights and the High Court both ruled in favour of a legal challenge by convicted double murderer Anthony Anderson. Anderson had been sentenced to life imprisonment in 1988 and the trial judge recommended that he should serve a minimum of 15 years before being considered for parole, but the Home Secretary later decided on a 20-year minimum term.
- 10 December
  - Sydney Brenner and John E. Sulston win the Nobel Prize in Physiology or Medicine jointly with H. Robert Horvitz "for their discoveries concerning 'genetic regulation of organ development and programmed cell death'".
  - Cherie Blair apologises for the embarrassment she caused in buying flats with the help of convicted fraudster Peter Foster.
- 19 December
  - Shaied Nazir, Ahmed Ali Awan and Sarfraz Ali are all convicted of the racist murder of Ross Parker in Peterborough.
  - Stuart Campbell, a 44-year-old builder from Grays in Essex, is found guilty of murdering his 15-year-old niece Danielle Jones 18 months ago. Danielle's body has never been found. It is then revealed that Campbell, who is sentenced to life imprisonment, has a string of previous convictions including keeping an underage girl at his home without lawful authority in 1989.

== See also ==
- 2002 in Northern Ireland
- 2002 in Scotland
- 2002 in Wales
