= 2005 in England =

- Centuries: 19th; 20th; 21st
- Decades: 1980s; 1990s; 2000s; 2010s; 2020s
- See also: 2004–05 in English football 2005–06 in English football 2005 in the United Kingdom; Other events of 2005

Events from 2005 in England

== Incumbent ==
- Monarch - Elizabeth II
- Prime Minister - Tony Blair

== Events ==
=== January ===
- 5 January – Funeral of Angus Ogilvy, husband of Princess Alexandra, takes place at St. George's Chapel, Windsor Castle.
- 8 January
  - After a night of stormy weather, extensive flooding has occurred in Carlisle as well as other locations and many homes are without power.
- 12 January – Britain's tallest self-supporting sculpture, the "B of the Bang", is unveiled in Manchester by Linford Christie.
- 15 January – Conservative Member of Parliament Robert Jackson, MP for Wantage, Oxfordshire, defects to the Labour Party.
- 26 January
  - Closure of Ellington Colliery at Ellington, Northumberland, the last remaining operational deep coal mine in North East England, and the last in the UK to extract coal from under the sea.
  - Rodney Marsh, the former England national football star, is dismissed from his position as a pundit on Sky Sports because of a joke he made live on air concerning the Asian tsunami.
- 29 January – Chris Smith, the former British Culture Secretary, reveals that he has been HIV positive for 17 years.

=== February ===
- 2 February
  - Two firefighters and a member of the public die in a fire on the 14th and 15th floors of a 17-storey tower block in Stevenage, Hertfordshire. Seven other people are hospitalised, one in serious condition, and 70 people are evacuated from the block.
- 7 February – Englishwoman Ellen MacArthur sets a record for the quickest round-the-world solo sail. She completed the 27,354-mile (44,022 km) journey in 71 days, 14 hours, 18 minutes and 33 seconds, breaking the old record of 72 days, 22 hours, 54 minutes and 22 seconds, set by Francis Joyon in 2004, which itself took 20 days off the previous record.
- 10 February – Clarence House announces that the Prince of Wales (now Charles III) is to marry Camilla Parker Bowles on Friday 8 April in a civil ceremony at Windsor Castle. She was styled HRH The Duchess of Cornwall from then until his accession in 2022, and it was announced that, when Charles would become king, she would become HRH The Princess Consort — in the event, she actually became Her Majesty The Queen.
- 14 February
  - Hare coursing: As the final Waterloo Cup event in England starts in Altcar, four anti-coursing protesters are arrested. The event is expected to attract up to 10,000 spectators over its 3 days.
  - London's mayor Ken Livingstone is censured by the London Assembly for comparing a Jewish journalist for the Evening Standard to a concentration camp guard. Livingstone refuses to withdraw his comments.
- 17 February – The BNFL nuclear plant at Sellafield, in the United Kingdom, reports that 30 kg (66 lb) of plutonium is "unaccounted for". This amount of missing plutonium would be sufficient to make seven atomic bombs. The UK Atomic Energy Authority states that the discrepancy in the record keeping is merely an auditing issue, and that there was no "real loss" of plutonium.
- 18 February – The Hunting Act, the ban on hunting with dogs in England and Wales, comes into force. Its opponents intend to challenge the law and hunt.

=== March ===
- 1 March – The New Forest in Hampshire becomes England's twelfth national park.

=== April ===
- 9 April – The wedding of Prince Charles and Camilla Parker Bowles in a 20-minute ceremony at Windsor Guildhall, which is followed by a blessing at St George's Chapel, Windsor Castle.

=== May ===
- 9 May – The Sellafield nuclear plant's Thorp reprocessing facility in Cumbria, is closed down due to the confirmation of a 20 tonne leak of highly radioactive uranium and plutonium fuel through a fractured pipe.
- 12 May – Malcolm Glazer gains control of Manchester United after securing a 70% share, ending more than 30 years of ownership by the Edwards family.
- 21 May – Arsenal become the first team to win the FA Cup on penalties after they defeat Manchester United in a shoot-out that follows a goalless draw.
- 27 May – Mark Hobson is sentenced to life imprisonment at Leeds Crown Court after admitting four charges of murder. On a killing spree in July last year, 35-year-old Hobson killed his girlfriend Claire Sanderson, Claire's sister Diane Sanderson, as well as pensioners James and Joan Britton. The trial judge recommends that Hobson is never released from prison.

=== June ===
- 17 June – The Ugandan-born bishop of Birmingham, John Sentamu is named the new Archbishop of York. He is the first ever black person to be appointed an Archbishop of the Church of England.

=== July ===
- 6 July – London is chosen as the host city for the 2012 Olympic Games, beating Paris in the final round of votes 54 to 50.
- 7 July – A series of co-ordinated terrorist bombings strike London's public transport system during the morning rush hour. Three bombs exploded within 50 seconds of each other on three London Underground trains. A fourth bomb exploded on a bus at an hour later in Tavistock Square. More than 50 people are killed and hundreds more are injured.
- 14 July – A two-minute silence is held across Europe at 12:00 BST to remember the victims of the London bombings.
- 21 July – Four attempted bomb attacks in London disrupt part of the capital's public transport. Small explosions occur around midday at Shepherd's Bush, Warren Street and Oval stations on London Underground, and on a bus in Bethnal Green. However, there are no injuries.
- 22 July
  - The Metropolitan Police shoot Jean Charles de Menezes dead, believed by them (mistakenly) to be one of the previous day's would-be suicide bombers.
  - Tower of St Edmundsbury Cathedral at Bury St Edmunds completed.
- 28 July – Birmingham tornado
- 29 July
  - Two of the suspects of the July 21 attempted bombings in London are arrested in North Kensington, the fourth is arrested in Rome.
  - Killing of Richard Whelan
- 30 July – Murder of Anthony Walker

=== August ===
- 3 August – Merseyside Police launch a murder investigation after three men break into the home of 22-year-old Lucy Hargreaves and shoot her, before setting the property on fire. The crime remains unsolved as of 2025.
- 11 August – British Airways grounds all flights as baggage handlers, loaders and bus drivers strike in support of 800 workers sacked by flight catering company Gategourmet. The strike is also affecting other airlines, causing chaos at Heathrow Airport
- 21 August – Victory over Japan Day: A service is held at London's Cenotaph to mark the sixtieth anniversary of the end of World War II. The Prince of Wales is in attendance, as are survivors of the Far East campaign.

=== September ===
- 12 September – England cricket team wins The Ashes.
- 29 September – The High Court decides that Ian Huntley, serving life imprisonment for the double child murders at Soham three years ago, should serve at least 40 years in prison before being considered for parole. This ruling is set to keep Huntley behind bars until at least 2042 and the age of 68.

=== October ===
- 18 October – The landmark Spinnaker Tower in Portsmouth opens. At 170 metres (560 ft) it is the tallest accessible structure in the UK outside London.
- 22–23 October – Birmingham race riots.

=== November ===
- 24 November – Pubs in England and Wales permitted to open for 24 hours for the first time.
- 30 November – Quadruple killer Mark Hobson loses a High Court appeal against his trial judge's recommendation that he should never be released from prison.

=== December ===
- 6 December – David Cameron, 39-year-old MP for Witney in Oxfordshire, is elected Leader of the Conservative Party, defeating David Davis.
- 10 December – Harold Pinter wins the Nobel Prize in Literature "who in his plays uncovers the precipice under everyday prattle and forces entry into oppression's closed rooms".
- 11 December – Hertfordshire Oil Storage Terminal fire: explosions tear through Buncefield oil storage facility located near Hemel Hempstead in Hertfordshire.

== Births ==
- 7 March – Penny Healey, archer
- 23 October – Euan McCabe, diver
- 11 April – Jack Hinshelwood, footballer

== See also ==
- 2005 in Northern Ireland
- 2005 in Scotland
- 2005 in Wales
