= 2003 in England =

- Centuries: 19th; 20th; 21st
- Decades: 1980s; 1990s; 2000s; 2010s; 2020s
- See also: 2002–03 in English football 2003–04 in English football 2003 in the United Kingdom; Other events of 2003

Events from 2003 in England

== Incumbent ==
- Monarch - Elizabeth II
- Prime Minister - Tony Blair

== Events ==
- 10 January – Ian Carr, a 27-year-old banned driver with a total of 89 previous convictions (including causing death by dangerous driving), admits causing the death by dangerous driving of a six-year-old girl in Ashington, Northumberland – a crime which sparks widespread public and media outrage across Britain.
- 14 January – Anti-terrorism detective Stephen Oake is murdered in Crumpsall, Manchester by Islamic terrorist Kamel Bourgass after being stabbed eight times while attempting his arrest.
- 25 January – Central line underground train crashes into the tunnel wall at Chancery Lane tube station in London, injuring 34 people.
- 29 January – Sally Clark, a 38-year-old former solicitor from Cheshire, is released from prison after the Court of Appeal clears her of murdering her two sons, who are believed to have died of Cot Death.
- 31 January – One of the longest prison sentences ever issued in a British court for a motoring offence is handed down on killer driver Ian Carr, who received a 9 1/2-year sentence for causing death by dangerous driving – his second conviction for the crime in 12 years.
- 15 February –
  - In London, more than 2 million people demonstrate against the Iraq War, the largest demonstration in British history.
  - The Chohan family disappear from their home in London.
- 17 February - The London congestion charge, a fee levied on motorists travelling within designated parts of central London, comes into operation.
- 27 February - Rowan Williams enthroned as Archbishop of Canterbury.
- 28 May – The UEFA Champions League Final at Old Trafford (home to Manchester United) with Juventus beating AC Milan in a penalty shootout following a goalless draw.
- 10 June – Soham Murders suspect Ian Huntley returns to Woodhill Prison after being treated for the effects of an overdose yesterday.
- 13 June – First Minister for Children appointed, Margaret Hodge.
- 15 June – The News of the World publishes an article in which Ian Huntley is photographed in his cell at Woodhill Prison. An undercover reporter had got a job in the prison and was being employed as Huntley's guard.
- 2 July – Chelsea F.C. are bought by Russian billionaire Roman Abramovich for £150million from current chairman Ken Bates, 21 years after he bought the club for £1.
- 10 August – Brogdale enters the UK Weather Records for the highest ever recorded temperature of 38.5 °C. The 2003 European heat wave makes this Britain's hottest summer for 13 years.
- 4 September – The Bullring Shopping Centre in Birmingham is officially opened by Sir Albert Bore.
- 18 September – Brent East by-election: Sarah Teather of the Liberal Democrats becomes MP for Brent East after 29 years of Labour control.
- 29 October – Iain Duncan Smith resigns after just over two years as leader of the Conservative Party.
- 5 November – The Perch Garage murders in Cornwall.
- 8 November – Sophie, Countess of Wessex gives birth to her and Prince Edward's first child, a baby girl.
- 16 November – David Davis, the new Shadow Home Secretary, calls for a return of the death penalty for murderers found guilty of the most horrific murders; citing Moors Murderer Ian Brady and Yorkshire Ripper Peter Sutcliffe as criminals whose crimes would meet the criteria.
- 18 November – Passage of the Local Government Act 2003 including the repeal in England, Northern Ireland and Wales of controversial Section 28 of the Local Government Act 1988 which prevented local authorities from "promoting homosexuality". Section 28 had already been repealed in Scotland in 2000.
- 22 November – England are rugby world champions after defeating Australia 20-17 after extra time.
- 26 November – The final Concorde to fly touches down for the last time in Filton, Bristol where it was welcomed by the Duke of York
- 9 December – The M6 Toll motorway opens, giving the United Kingdom its first toll motorway and providing a northern by-pass for the congested section of the M6 motorway through the West Midlands conurbation.
- 10 December
  - Anthony J. Leggett wins the Nobel Prize in Physics jointly with Alexei Alexeyevich Abrikosov and Vitaly Ginzburg "for pioneering contributions to the theory of superconductors and superfluids".
  - Peter Mansfield wins the Nobel Prize in Physiology or Medicine jointly with Paul Lauterbur "for their discoveries concerning magnetic resonance imaging".
  - The Court of Appeal overturns two murder convictions against 40-year-old Wiltshire woman Angela Cannings, who was wrongly convicted of murdering her two baby sons in April last year. Mrs Cannings, who has a surviving daughter, always maintained that her sons were both Cot Death victims.
- 12 December – Mick Jagger of The Rolling Stones receives a knighthood from the Prince of Wales (now Charles III).
- 16 December – The Government announces plans to build a new runway at Stansted Airport in Essex and a short-haul runway at Heathrow Airport sparking anger from environmental groups.
- 17 December
  - Ian Huntley is found guilty of the Soham Murders and sentenced to life imprisonment at the Old Bailey. A High Court judge will later decide on the minimum number of the years that he will have to serve before being considered for parole. His ex-girlfriend Maxine Carr is found guilty of perverting the course of justice and receives a jail term of three-and-a-half years, but she will be freed on licence (under a new identity to protect her from reprisal attacks) in May 2004 as she has already served 16 months on remand.
  - Home Secretary David Blunkett orders an inquiry into how the police vetting system failed to prevent Ian Huntley from getting a job in a school, after it was revealed at the end of his murder trial that he had been suspected in the past of crimes including underage sex, rape, indecent assault and burglary.
- 26 December – A policeman dies and two others are injured after being shot by a man they were questioning about a suspicious BMW car in Leeds, West Yorkshire.
- 31 December – David Bieber, a 37-year-old former American marine, is arrested on suspicion of the Boxing Day police shootings in Leeds.

== Births ==
- 29 January – Jarell Quansah, English footballer
- 3 September – Harvey Davies, English footballer
- 9 December – Chris Sze, Malaysian footballer

== See also ==
- 2003 in Northern Ireland
- 2003 in Scotland
- 2003 in Wales
