= Mark Hobson =

Mark Hobson may refer to:

- Mark Hobson (boxer) (born 1976), British former professional boxer
- Mark Hobson (spree killer) (born 1969), British spree killer
