= 2004 in England =

- Centuries: 19th; 20th; 21st
- Decades: 1980s; 1990s; 2000s; 2010s; 2020s
- See also: 2003–04 in English football 2004–05 in English football 2004 in the United Kingdom; Other events of 2004

Events from 2004 in England

== Incumbent ==
- Monarch - Elizabeth II
- Prime Minister - Tony Blair

== Events ==
=== January ===
- 13 January
  - Serial killer Dr. Harold Shipman is found dead in his cell; suicide is suspected.
  - The Bichard Inquiry into events preceding the Soham murders formally opens.
- 14 January – A 45-year-old Sudanese man travelling from Washington Dulles International Airport to Dubai is arrested en route at London's Heathrow Airport on suspicion of carrying five bullets in his coat pocket.
- 19 January – The English Court of Appeal calls for an end to the prosecution of parents whose babies may have died of Sudden Infant Death Syndrome (cot death) in cases where the only evidence is contended expert testimony.
- 27 January – Prime Minister Tony Blair narrowly defeats an internal Labour Party rebellion over the Higher Education Bill – a highly controversial bill to reform higher education funding, including the introduction of increased and variable tuition fees – in the House of Commons by 316 votes to 311.
- 28 January – The Hutton Inquiry into the circumstances of the death of Dr. David Kelly is published. This is taken by most of the press to strongly condemn the BBC's handling of the David Kelly affair and to exonerate the Government; the BBC's Director-General, Greg Dyke, chairman of the Board of Governors, Gavyn Davies, and the journalist at the centre of the controversy, Andrew Gilligan, resign. The UK media in general condemns the report as a whitewash.

=== February ===
- 1 February - Media sources and victim support groups across Britain condemn the £11,000 payouts to the families of the two girls who were murdered at Soham in August 2002 as a "pittance". The compensation was paid out by the Criminal Injuries Compensation Authority.
- 5 February/6 February – A party of Chinese cockle pickers is caught by the tides at night in Morecambe Bay, Lancashire, drowning 23 people. 21 bodies are recovered.
- 6 February – The Home Office confirms that Maxine Carr, convicted with Ian Huntley concerning the Soham murders of 2001, could be released from prison in the next few days.
- 25 February – Katharine Gun, formerly an employee of British spy agency GCHQ, has a charge of breaching the Official Secrets Act dropped after prosecutors offered no evidence, apparently on the advice of the Attorney General for England and Wales. Gun had admitted leaking American plans to bug UN delegates to a newspaper.
- 29 February – Middlesbrough F.C. win their first trophy in their 128-year history by defeating Bolton Wanderers F.C. in the Football League Cup Final.
- February – Andrew Malkinson is wrongfully convicted of rape; the conviction would be overturned in 2023 due to exculpatory evidence after 17 years in prison, ten of which were due to maintaining his innocence.

=== April ===
- 28 April – Landmark office building 30 St Mary Axe ("The Gherkin") in the City of London, designed by Norman Foster, opens.

=== May ===
- 10 May – Maxine Carr is released from prison with a new identity after serving half of her sentence for perverting the course of justice.
- 11 May – Stockline Plastics factory explosion: four people die in an explosion at a factory in Glasgow.
- 22 May – Manchester United beat Millwall 3–0 in the FA Cup final.
- 27 May – The Member of Parliament for Leicester South, Jim Marshall dies, triggering a by-election.

=== June ===
- 2 June – José Mourinho, the Portuguese football coach who led Porto to UEFA Champions League glory on 26 May, is named as the new manager of Chelsea F.C on a three-year contract.
- 10 June – A rebranding of the Football League sees Division One become the Football League Championship, Division Two become League One and Division Three become League Two.
- 11 June – The sitting mayor Ken Livingstone is announced as the winner of the election for Mayor of London.
- 14 June – Results of the European elections are announced. The United Kingdom Independence Party is the main gainer, increasing from 3 to 12 MEPs, all in England.
- 16 June – Liverpool F.C. appoint the Spaniard Rafael Benítez as their new manager.
- 21 June – The Football League club Wimbledon F.C, who relocated to Milton Keynes from South London last autumn, are renamed Milton Keynes Dons to reflect their new location.
- 24 June – England are knocked out of Euro 2004 by Portugal, on penalties.
- 29 June – Islamic terrorist Kamel Bourgass, an illegal immigrant from Algeria, is convicted of the 2003 murder of police officer Stephen Oake and the attempted murder of two other officers. The crimes occurred in Manchester, with Oake stabbed eight times.

=== July ===
- 2 July
  - An openly gay cleric, Jeffrey John is installed as the Dean of St Albans.
  - A court rules that Humberside Police Authority must suspend the Chief Constable, David Westwood, in accordance with the Home Secretary (David Blunkett)'s demands.
- 13 July – The Countryside Agency publicises a new Countryside Code in advance of the 'Right to Roam' coming into effect across in England in September.
- 15 July – The Leicester South and Birmingham Hodge Hill by-elections are held. Hodge Hill is retained by Labour, but the party loses Leicester South to 37-year-old Liberal Democrat Parmjit Singh Gill; an Indian Sikh who is the first ethnic minority Lib Dem MP.
- 18 July – North Yorkshire police launch a murder hunt after 27-year-old twin sisters Claire and Diane Sanderson are found dead in a flat in Camblesforth, near Selby.
- 19 July – The Government announces backing for the Crossrail project.
- 20 July – The Government to publish results of a review into the Council Tax.

=== August ===
- 9 August – West Brom terminate the contract of striker Lee Hughes as he is sentenced to six years in prison after being found guilty causing death by dangerous driving, having killed a 56-year-old man in a collision near Coventry on 22 November 2003.
- 16 August – Boscastle flood of 2004: flash floods destroy buildings and wash cars out to sea in Cornwall.
- 28 August – Kelly Holmes wins her second gold medal at the 2004 Summer Olympics.

=== September ===
- 13 September – A Fathers 4 Justice campaigner dressed as Batman breaches security at Buckingham Palace.
- 15 September – Parliament is suspended after pro-hunt campaigners break into the House of Commons.

=== October ===
- 7 October – British hostage Ken Bigley, of Liverpool, is beheaded by militants in Iraq.

=== November ===
- 4 November – A referendum is held in North East England on the establishment of elected regional assemblies. The majority of the electorate voted "No" to the proposals.
- 6 November – Ufton Nervet rail crash: Seven people are killed when a train is derailed by a car deliberately left parked on a level crossing in Berkshire.
- 15 November – Children Act clarifies most official responsibilities for children in England and Wales, notably bringing all local government functions for children's welfare and education under the authority of local Directors of Children's Services.
- 16 November – The Government announces plans to ban smoking in most enclosed public places (including workplaces) in England and Wales within the next three years.
- 18 November – Parliament passes the Hunting Act 2004 banning fox hunting in England and Wales. Fox hunting had already been outlawed in Scotland two years earlier, in 2002.

=== December ===
- 2 December – David Bieber, a 38-year-old former United States marine, is found guilty of murdering PC Ian Broadhurst in Leeds on Boxing Day last year. He is sentenced to life imprisonment and the trial judge recommends that he should never be released from prison. After his conviction, it is revealed that Bieber was wanted in connection with a 1995 murder in Florida. It is also revealed that he had entered the UK by using the name Nathan Wayne Coleman — who turned out to be a child who had died in infancy in 1968.
- 14 December – Millau Viaduct in France, designed by English architect Norman Foster, is opened.
- 17 December – The Sage Gateshead, a concert hall designed by Foster and Partners, opens.
- 26 December – A significant number of English people on holiday are among the thousands of people killed by a tsunami in the Indian Ocean. The victims are died in several countries including Indonesia and Thailand.

== Births ==
- 2 March – Freya Colbert, Swimmer
- 27 June – Khiara Keating, footballer

== See also ==
- 2004 in Northern Ireland
- 2004 in Scotland
- 2004 in Wales
