= 2005 in Scotland =

- Centuries: 19th; 20th; 21st
- Decades: 1980s; 1990s; 2000s; 2010s; 2020s
- See also: List of years in Scotland; Timeline of Scottish history 2005 in: The UK • England • Wales • Elsewhere; Scottish football: 2004–05 • 2005–06; 2005 in Scottish television

Events from the year 2005 in Scotland.

== Incumbents ==
- First Minister and Keeper of the Great Seal – Jack McConnell
- Secretary of State for Scotland – Alistair Darling

=== Law officers ===
- Lord Advocate – Lord Boyd of Duncansby
- Solicitor General for Scotland – Elish Angiolini
- Advocate General for Scotland – Lynda Clark

=== Judiciary ===
- Lord President of the Court of Session and Lord Justice General – Lord Cullen of Whitekirk until 2 December; then Lord Hamilton
- Lord Justice Clerk – Lord Gill
- Chairman of the Scottish Land Court – Lord McGhie

== Events ==
=== January ===
- January – Violence Reduction Unit formed by Strathclyde Police to target all forms of violent behaviour.
- 8 January – after a night of stormy weather the Irish Sea ferry European Highlander has run aground on the south-west coast, with passengers remaining on board rather than evacuating under the prevailing conditions.
- 11 January – 5 people are killed on Uist when their cars are washed from the coast road in a storm.
- 20 January – Carolyn Leckie, a Member of the Scottish Parliament, is jailed for seven days for non-payment of a fine arising from a protest at Faslane nuclear base.

=== March ===
- 21 March – agreement announced for sale of Jenners department store of Edinburgh to the House of Fraser.

=== April ===
- 21 April – Gaelic Language (Scotland) Act passed by the Scottish Parliament, the first piece of legislation in the UK to give formal recognition to the Scottish Gaelic language. It aims to secure Gaelic as an official language of Scotland, commanding "equal respect" with English, by establishing Bòrd na Gàidhlig within the framework of the government of Scotland (Royal Assent: 1 June).

=== May ===
- 5 May – UK general election results in Labour winning 41 of Scotland's 59 seats, with the Liberal Democrats winning eleven, the SNP winning six and the Conservatives winning one.

=== June ===
- 1 June – Gaelic Language (Scotland) Act of the Scottish Parliament establishes Bòrd na Gàidhlig to secure the status of Scottish Gaelic as an official language of Scotland.
- 23 June – Prince William of Wales graduates from the University of St Andrews.

=== July ===
- 1 July – New Royal Bank of Scotland headquarters opened at Gogarburn on the outskirts of Edinburgh.
- 5 July – Riots in Edinburgh by anti-capitalist and anti-G8 protesters.
- 6 July
  - 31st G8 summit, hosted by the UK, begins at the Gleneagles Hotel in Perthshire.
  - Edinburgh 50,000 - The Final Push concert held in Edinburgh.
- 8 July – Scottish Jacobite Party formed, favouring an independent Scottish republic.

=== August ===
- 5 August – The Smoking, Health and Social Care (Scotland) Act 2005, banning smoking in enclosed public spaces, gets Royal assent.

=== September ===
- 29 September;
  - Livingston by-election results in Jim Devine retaining the seat for Labour; though with a reduced majority in the face of a swing of 10.2% to the Scottish National Party.
  - Glasgow Cathcart by-election results in Charlie Gordon retaining the seat for Labour in the face of a 3.7% swing towards the SNP.

=== October ===
- 4 October – The Northern Lighthouse Board decommissions its last Scottish lighthouse foghorn, at Skerryvore.
- 5 October – Three perpetrators of the racially motivated murder of fifteen-year-old Kriss Donald arrive in Scotland to face trial in a one-off extradition agreement negotiated with Pakistan.

=== November ===
- November – Loch Ewe Distillery established.
- 13 November – Andrew Stimpson, a 25-year-old man from Scotland, is reported as the first person proven to have been 'cured' of HIV.
- 21 November – Alfred Anderson, one of the last surviving First World War veterans and the oldest man in Scotland, dies aged 109. He is also the last known survivor of the 1914 Christmas truce. There are now only approximately twenty surviving British veterans of the conflict, all aged over 100 years.

== Deaths ==
- 30 January – Martyn Bennett, Celtic fusion musician (born 1971 in Canada)
- 24 February – Robin Jenkins, novelist (born 1912)
- 26 April – Gordon Campbell, Baron Campbell of Croy, Conservative politician, Secretary of State for Scotland (born 1921)
- 29 June – John Burgess, bagpiper (born 1934)
- 15 July – David Daiches, literary scholar (born 1912 in England)
- 6 August – Robin Cook, Labour MP, former Foreign Secretary (born 1946)
- 22 October – Muriel Gibson, Scottish nationalist activist and military officer (born 1912)
- 7 December – Lucy d'Abreu, supercentenarian, oldest person in U.K. at date of death (born 1892 in the British Raj)

== The arts ==
- 5 May – Theresa Breslin's young adult novel Divided City is published.
- Kevin MacNeil's first novel The Stornoway Way is published.
- Indie pop band Reverieme forms in Airdrie.
- Scottish hip hop duo Silibil N' Brains forms.

== See also ==
- 2004 in England
- 2004 in Northern Ireland
- 2004 in Wales
