= Maxine Carr =

Maxine Carr may refer to:

- Maxine Waters (née Carr; born 1938), American politician
- Maxine Carr (born 1977), convicted of perverting the course of justice in relation to the Soham murders
