= Michael Bichard, Baron Bichard =

British civil servant (born 1947)

The Right Honourable The Lord Bichard KCB

Member of the House of Lords
- Lord Temporal
- Life peerage 24 March 2010

Personal details
- Born: Michael George Bichard; 31 January 1947 (age 79) Southampton, Hampshire, England
- Spouses: Sian Selves (m. 1969, divorced) Christine Wray (m. 1987, divorced): Gillian Guy
- Children: 3
- Education: University of Birmingham; University of Manchester
- Occupation: Civil servant

Michael George Bichard, Baron Bichard, KCB (born 31 January 1947) is a former public servant in the United Kingdom, first in local and then as a civil servant in central government. He was director of the Institute for Government, currently serves as one of its first fellows, and was chair of the Design Council. He was a created a crossbench life peer on 24 March 2010. He is an advisor to The Key Support Services Limited, which provide leadership and management support to school leaders and governors. He became chair of the Social Care Institute for Excellence (SCIE) in 2013.

== Career ==
Bichard served as the chief executive of Brent Council between 1980 and 1986, and then of Gloucestershire County Council between 1986 and 1990, when he was appointed chief executive of the Benefits Agency.

In 1995, Bichard was made Permanent Secretary of the Department for Employment. When it merged with the Department for Education (DfE) to form the Department for Education and Employment (DfEE), he became Permanent Secretary of the combined department, under Gillian Shephard, and then, post-1997, David Blunkett. He became extremely close to Blunkett, even at one point intervening personally – according to the National press – to ensure that details of an affair that Blunkett was conducting with his Private Secretary should not become public.

During his time as Permanent Secretary, he introduced several modernising reforms to the department, notably in bringing its use of information technology and new media up to date. He oversaw some significant changes to the education policy landscape, such as the introduction of the Learning and Skills Council to fund further education and apprenticeships.

In May 2001, he retired from the Civil Service, when DfEE and the Department for Social Security were split into the Department for Education and Skills and Department for Work and Pensions.

== After retirement ==
In September 2001, Bichard was appointed Rector of The University of the Arts London and also served as chairman of the Design Council. In 2004, the Home Secretary David Blunkett (previously Bichard's minister as Secretary of State for Education and Employment) appointed Bichard to chair an inquiry into the "Soham murders" of two 10-year-old girls; the inquiry has since been known as the "Bichard Inquiry".

Bichard was non-executive chairman of RSe Consulting from 2003 to 2008. RSe Consulting provided strategic and management consulting services to local government and became part of Tribal Group Plc in 2008. He was appointed chairman of the Legal Services Commission in April 2005. There he introduced a range of reforming measures aimed at modernising the legal aid system. He was also chairman of the educational charity Rathbone. Bichard left these two roles in September 2008 when he became the Director of the Institute for Government. He became chairman of the board of FILMCLUB, a nationwide after-school film club scheme which is free to state primary and secondary schools.

He has been an advisor to Ten Group, the lifestyle concierge and professional support services company, since 2010, supporting the development of its school leader and school governor support services – The Key and Ten Governor Support. Bichard came in for criticism in October 2012 when he suggested that retired people should contribute to society by doing community work in order to help the state or lose their pension. Robert Oxley of the Tax Payers Alliance said "it's a bit rich from a civil servant who was able to retire early to lecture us on working during retirement".

He became chair of the Social Care Institute for Excellence (SCIE) in 2013. He is chair of the international editorial board of Public Money & Management and chairs the journal's annual PMM Live! event.

Following a governance scandal at the Royal Institution of Chartered Surveyors, in December 2021, the RICS announced Bichard would lead a six-month review into its governance and future purpose. The 68-page Bichard review, recommending sweeping reforms, was published on 21 June 2022.

Bichard said: "My aim has been to help create a new sense of purpose and direction so that RICS can once more stand tall as an exemplar professional institution." In August 2022, Bichard was appointed as interim senior independent governor through to 31 December 2023, responsible for scrutinising the actions of the RICS' governing council and committees.

In April 2022, he was announced as the new Chancellor of the University of Gloucestershire, succeeding Baroness Rennie Fritchie.

== Honours and peerage ==
Bichard was appointed Knight Commander of the Order of the Bath (KCB) in the 1999 Birthday Honours. On the recommendation of the House of Lords Appointments Commission, he was created a life peer on 24 March 2010, as Baron Bichard, of Nailsworth in the County of Gloucestershire. He was introduced in the House of Lords on 29 March, where he sits on the crossbenches.

== Offices held ==
Government offices
| Preceded by Vincent Scroggins | Chief Executive of the Benefits Agency, Department for Employment; 1990–1995 | Succeeded by Peter Mathison |
| Preceded by Sir Nicholas Monck | Permanent Secretary of the Department for Employment; 1995 | Succeeded by Himself as Permanent Secretary of the Department for Education and Employment |
| Preceded by Himself as Permanent Secretary of the Department for Employment | Permanent Secretary of the Department for Education and Employment; 1995–2001 | Succeeded by Sir David Normington as Permanent Secretary of the Department for Education and Skills |
| Preceded by Sir Timothy Lankester as Permanent Secretary of the Department for Education | Permanent Secretary of the Department for Education and Employment; 1995–2001 | Succeeded by Rachel Lomax as Permanent Secretary of the Department for Work and Pensions |

Orders of precedence in the United Kingdom
| Preceded by The Lord Kakkar | Gentlemen; Baron Bichard | Followed by The Lord Hill of Oareford |
