= Anthony Russell (murderer) =

British murderer (born 1982)

- Born: 16 April 1982 (age 44); Coventry, West Midlands, England
- Known for: Murders of David Williams, Julie Williams, Nicole McGregor and Ian Huntley
- Status: Imprisoned
- Criminal charges: Murder, rape
- Penalty: Life imprisonment (whole life order)

Details
- Victims: 3
- Span of crimes: 21 – 26 October 2020
- Date apprehended: 30 October 2020
- Imprisoned at: HM Prison Frankland

Anthony Russell (born 16 April 1982) is a British murderer, spree killer, and convicted rapist. In October 2020, he murdered Julie Williams, her son David Williams, and Nicole McGregor, whom he raped before killing and leaving in woodland near Leamington Spa. He received a whole life order for the three murders.

In March 2026, Russell was charged with the murder of Ian Huntley following an alleged assault at HMP Frankland.

== 2020 murder spree ==
In October 2020, Russell killed three people in Coventry and Leamington Spa. On 23 October, 58-year-old Julie Williams contacted West Midlands Police to report that her son, 31-year-old David Williams, was missing. Two days later, Julie's sister reported that Julie was also missing. Police officers entered Julie's home in Coventry and found her dead on the floor of her living room. She had sustained 113 separate injuries and suffered trauma to the head and neck.

The following day, after receiving a tip‑off, police raided the home of 38‑year‑old Anthony Russell, who had allegedly confessed to killing both Julie and David. Upon entering the property, officers found David’s body hidden under a bed; Russell had strangled him with a lanyard on 21 October. By this point, Russell had already fled Coventry after stealing money and a mobile phone from a 78‑year‑old man he had robbed the previous day.

A major manhunt was launched. Russell used public transport to travel to Kenilworth, where he robbed a 71‑year‑old woman of £200, dragging her along the ground during the attack. He then travelled to Leamington Spa, also by public transport. There, he lured 31‑year‑old Nicole McGregor, who was eighteen weeks pregnant, to Newbold Comyn on the promise of supplying her with drugs. On 26 October, Russell raped and murdered McGregor and left her body in dense undergrowth near the River Leam. Her body was found on 29 October, covered in scratches and bruises that indicated she had been dragged through woodland. Russell then fled Leamington Spa on foot and attacked a 75‑year‑old man in his home before stealing his car.

== Capture ==
On 30 October, Russell was captured in Staffordshire in the early hours. He was found sleeping in the back seat of the car he had stolen on a road near Burton upon Trent. When first questioned in custody, he remained silent and kept a blanket over his head. He later admitted to all three murders, as well as the robberies and the wounding of the carjacking victim.

West Midlands Police established that Russell had first killed David Williams because he mistakenly believed that Williams was in a relationship with his girlfriend at the time. He then killed Julie Williams, believing that she knew too much and wishing to prevent her from speaking to the police. Despite admitting to all three murders, Russell denied raping McGregor.

== Trials ==
In February 2022, Russell was tried at Warwick Crown Court for the aggravated rape of McGregor. He chose not to give evidence. After more than six hours of deliberation, the jury told the court that they would be unable to reach a verdict, even if given additional time, and were discharged.

In March 2022, Russell was retried at Warwick Crown Court. The hearing included three days of evidence from multiple witnesses, including McGregor's boyfriend at the time of her murder, Christopher White. Prosecutors argued that Russell's motive for killing McGregor had been to prevent her from reporting the rape. On 10 March, the jury returned a unanimous guilty verdict in just over an hour.

On 11 March, Russell was sentenced for the rape, as well as for the murder, assault, and robbery charges to which he had previously pleaded guilty. He received "lengthy" prison sentences for each offence; for each murder he was given a whole-life prison term, meaning he will never be eligible for parole. The sentencing judge described him as "exceptionally dangerous and manipulative". Russell refused to attend the hearing, and the court was told that attempts by staff to place him in a prison van had put them in "situations of danger".

== Fatal attack on Ian Huntley ==
On 26 February 2026, Ian Huntley, a child murderer convicted of the 2002 Soham murders, suffered severe brain trauma in an attack in a workshop at HM Prison Frankland, County Durham. According to reports, he had been struck with a spiked metal pole by another inmate. Huntley died in hospital on 7 March.

Russell was named as the prisoner accused of carrying out the attack before Huntley’s death. A prison source claimed that Russell had struck Huntley repeatedly upon the head with the pole, "with such force that part of the bar was lodged inside of him", after a fight broke out between the two men during a work assignment. Huntley was reported to have been "bullying" Russell. After the assault, Russell reportedly shouted, "I have done it. I have killed him." Other inmates were said to have cheered after the attack was carried out.

On 10 March, Russell was charged with the murder of Huntley.

== Media ==
Russell was profiled on the British crime television programme Britain's Most Evil Killers.

== See also ==
- List of prisoners with whole life orders
