= David Westwood =

British police officer

David Westwood, QPM, is a British former police officer. He was Chief Constable of Humberside Police from March 1999 until March 2005. In 2004, he was suspended from July until September as a result of the Bichard report into the Soham murders.

Westwood joined Sussex Police as a constable in 1967, and became a Sergeant in Avon and Somerset Constabulary in 1975. He was promoted to Inspector in 1980. He moved to Humberside Police in 1992, becoming Chief Superintendent, then became Assistant Chief Constable of Merseyside in 1995. Westwood became Deputy Chief Constable of Humberside in 1997, becoming Chief Constable in 1999.

He was chairman of the Association of Chief Police Officers Race and Community Relations Committee from 2000 until 2003, overseeing the introduction of new procedures for the Police Service on race issues following the publication of Sir William Macpherson's Inquiry into the murder of Stephen Lawrence. In 2001, Westwood was awarded the Queen's Police Medal for services to policing.

As a result of failings by Humberside Police highlighted by the report into the Soham murders, the Home Secretary, David Blunkett, called for Westwood's suspension, but the Humberside police authority chairman Colin Inglis initially refused. In July 2004, he was suspended after the High Court ruled that the police authority acted "in default of its statutory duty" by that refusal. Westwood was reinstated in September 2004, on condition he took early retirement in March 2005.

Police appointments
Preceded by D Anthony Leonard	Chief Constable of Humberside Police; 1999–2005	Succeeded by Tim Hollis
