= Patricia Wiltshire =

Forensic ecologist, botanist and palynologist

Patricia Wiltshire (born 16 February 1942) is a British forensic ecologist, botanist and palynologist. She has been consulted by police forces and industry in almost 300 investigations in several countries and has been instrumental in solving several high-profile crimes, including the killings of Sarah Payne and Milly Dowler, the cold case of Christopher Laverack, the Soham murders, and the Ipswich serial murders.

== Early life and education ==
Wiltshire was born in 1942 in the coal-mining valleys of Monmouthshire, South Wales. When she suffered severe burns in a home accident at the age of seven, followed by repeated chest infections that permanently damaged her lungs, her education was put on hold. She spent her convalescence reading encyclopaedias. After working as a medical laboratory technician (1960–1964), she moved on to a career in the business world and then studied botany at King's College London (1970–1973). She lectured there for several years in microbial and general ecology before taking up a post at the Institute of Archaeology at University College London. She was later responsible for setting up a Masters' course in forensic archaeological science which ran successfully and continued after she left UCL.

== High-profile cases ==
As a forensic scientist in the Soham murder inquiry, Wiltshire's analysis of soil and plant evidence from clothing, footwear, and a vehicle, yielded trace evidence that linked Ian Huntley to the place where the victims (Jessica Chapman and Holly Wells) were found. Observation and experimentation of plant growth at the deposition site enabled her to estimate the time that the girls had been placed in the ditch very accurately. Her evidence was important in the conviction of Ian Huntley.

In the 2007 Christopher Laverack murder case, three decades after the nine-year-old's murder, Wiltshire linked the unusual pollen and other plant matter on the victim's clothing, along with the ornamental brick used to keep him submerged after death, with that found on the property of his uncle, Melvyn Read, thus providing substantial evidence to implicate Read. The investigation, spanning three decades, was Humberside Police's longest-running unsolved murder case, and was solved in 2012.

== Other activities ==
Wiltshire is an Independent councillor on Mole Valley District Council, as is her husband, David Hawksworth.

== Bibliography ==
- Traces: The memoir of a forensic scientist and criminal investigator, Blink Publishing, 2019.
- The Nature of Life and Death - Every Body leaves a Trace - Tales of a Forensic Ecologist, Putnam publishers, 2019.
- The Natural History of Crime: Case Studies in Death and the Clues Nature Leaves Behind, Blink Publishing, 2024.
