= Bichard report =

English public inquiry into child protection

The Bichard report or Bichard inquiry is a public inquiry into child protection, which was produced after the subsequent media attention around the Soham murders, where two young girls were murdered in Cambridgeshire by the local college caretaker Ian Huntley.

The inquiry was launched on 18 December 2003, the day after an Old Bailey jury found Huntley guilty of murdering the two girls. After the verdict was delivered, it was revealed that Huntley had been investigated by police for crimes including burglary, indecent assault and rape during the 1990s, but had still been able to get a job as a school caretaker when he was appointed to Soham Village College in November 2001. The burglary charge had been ordered to lie on file, but police vetting procedures had failed to reveal this.

Michael Bichard was selected to chair the inquiry.

He said there should be a system where anyone working with children should be vetted before working with them. This report was published in 2004. This report was in connection to how someone like Ian Huntley, who was convicted of the Soham murders in 2003, was able to work in a school, and how this could be avoided in the future.

The key reconsiderations were:

- A registration scheme for all wishing to work with children or vulnerable people
- An introduction of a national police intelligence system for England and Wales
- A clear code of practice for all police forces for record keeping and sharing data
- Training for head teachers and governors on how to interview, ensuring that people are employed according to safeguarding rules
- A guidance for Social Services on when they should refer cases involving under-age sex to the police.

The main thing that has come from the Bichard report is CRB checks, making it possible to check each person for any previous crimes.
