= Teaching assistant (United Kingdom) =

School support staff role assisting teachers in the United Kingdom

A teaching assistant, educational assistant or learning support assistant (often abbreviated to TA, EA or LSA; sometimes classroom assistant) in schools in England and Wales is a person who supports pupils in the classroom. Duties can differ dramatically from school to school, though the underlying tasks often remain the same.

== Role ==
Teaching assistants are often used to take small groups of children out of a class that need extra support in an area, such as literacy or numeracy. This can also include work with children with special educational needs (SEN), either on a 1:1 basis or in an alternative provision to promote inclusion.

They are also mostly responsible for supporting children in their academic study and reporting back to the teacher if any issues arise. Helping teachers prepare for lessons by photocopying resources, or putting out equipment at the start of a lesson is another role of the teaching assistant, and one which is becoming increasingly common, due to the National Workforce Agreement (see below).

Teaching assistants are not qualified teachers, and as such, are led and guided by staff with qualified teacher status. The DfES (Department for Education and Skills) stated in the Consultation of 2002 that:

Most teaching requires the expertise and skills of a qualified teacher; but some teaching activity can be undertaken by suitably trained staff without QTS [qualified teacher status], provided they are working within a clear system of leadership and supervision provided by a qualified teacher. Qualified teachers must have overall responsibility for effective teaching and learning.

The occupation is constantly changing and evolving with the rest of the education workforce in the country. Teaching assistants are increasingly being given more and more responsibility within schools, and it remains to be seen how this "remodelling of the workforce" will alter the occupation. Some additional responsibilities may include supporting with behaviour intervention, running extracurricular activities, lunchtime supervision, and covering teaching staff in their absence. In the Early Years Foundation Stage (EYFS), TA's are sometimes included in adult to child ratios as per government guidelines. In some schools (particularly in SEN schools), where school policy permits, teaching assistants are seen to give personal care to children as required.

== HLTAs and the National Workforce Agreement ==
On 15 January 2003, unions and the DfES signed the National Workforce Agreement, which began a reform of raising school standards and tackling workloads.

This agreement created a "new breed" of teaching assistants: HLTAs (or Higher Level Teaching Assistants, sometimes referred to as Senior Learning Support Assistants). Their role is superior to teaching assistants and is to support the teacher further by covering lessons, and being more closely involved in children's learning. Becoming an HLTA requires a preparation course, in-school assessment, and a £450.00 fee. HLTA's in some schools may also take line management responsibility for teaching assistants in their areas, or take a particular school wide responsibility (for example, a subject area like EAL).

Giving teachers time for planning, preparation and assessment (PPA) was also raised in this agreement. By September 2005, all teachers must be given 10% teaching time away from the classroom to plan, prepare and assess. This requirement is easily accommodated for in most secondary schools, but where there is only one class teacher per class the PPA time is covered by normal teaching assistants, not just HLTAs, as originally planned. This has led to some concerns being raised.

== Professional development ==
There are nationally recognised qualifications for teaching assistants.

- NCFE Initial Training for Classroom Assistants, Stages 1 and 2
- City and Guilds award for Teaching Assistants (7327) (also Certificate and Advanced Certificate in Learning Support (7321))
- NVQ Teaching Assistants Level 2 and 3
- CACHE Level 2 and 3 Certificates in Supporting Teaching and Learning in Schools
- BTEC Level 2 and 3 Certificates for Teaching Assistants
- Open University Specialist Teacher Assistant Certificate
- CACHE Specialist Teacher Assistant (STA) Award
- Foundation Degree (usually in Education Studies, but shaped to meet the needs of the teaching assistant)
- HLTA (Higher Level Teaching Assistant) status

=== Scotland ===
In Scotland the term 'teaching assistant' is not formally used. Staff who work alongside teachers to support the learning of children are referred to as classroom assistants or pupil support workers. In addition to the above list of qualifications classroom assistants in Scotland may also earn:

- City and Guilds award for Classroom Assistants in Scotland (7328)
- Professional Development Award in Early Years Care and Education, for classroom assistants in Scotland

In addition there is no HLTA status in Scotland and Classroom Assistants do not cover classes.

=== Common progression routes ===
Despite the many qualifications available for teaching assistants, many do not have any formal training, and instead build up experience over many years. Those that do study often choose the NVQ Level 2 and/or 3 qualification, as it is the most widely studied in the profession.

Those that want to become a teaching assistant often come from nursery backgrounds or have qualifications in childcare.

=== Professional publications ===
Learning Support, a professional magazine for primary school teaching assistants, is published six times a year.

== Statistics ==
=== University of Plymouth and the DfES, 2002 ===
A survey carried out by the University of Plymouth and DfES gives an outline of who usually takes the role of the teaching assistant.

==== Gender ====
97% are female, 3% are male. A Local Government Management Board (LGMB) survey found that, as of 1996, 99% of teaching assistants were female.

==== Age ====
59.8% in primary schools are aged 35 to 48. 50.4% in secondary schools are aged 35 to 48.

==== Qualifications ====
39.4% in primary schools have no qualifications. 34.2% in secondary schools have no qualifications.

=== DfES, 2002 ===
In a separate survey, the DfES found that in January 2002, there were 216,000 full-time equivalent support staff in schools. This is an increase of over 50% since 1997.

Whereas the number of teachers only went up by around 10,000 over a period of five years (1998 to 2002), the number of teaching assistants went up by around 60,000.

- You will not be allowed in a school until you have been DBS (formerly CRB) checked.

== See also ==
- Personal assistant
