= Mark Hobson (spree killer) =

British spree killer (born 1969)

- Born: 2 September 1969 (age 57); Wakefield, West Riding of Yorkshire, England, UK
- Status: Imprisoned
- Convictions: Wounding with intent to cause grievous bodily harm and Failing to comply with bail conditions (June 2003); Breach of the peace (July 2003); Theft and Deception (February 2004); Murder - four counts (May 2005)
- Penalty: 100 hours Community Service and 2 years Probation; Fined £50; 50 hours Community Service; Life imprisonment (4 terms) with a whole life tariff

Details
- Date apprehended: 25 July 2004

Mark Richard Hobson (born 2 September 1969) is a British spree killer who killed four people in North Yorkshire, England, in July 2004. He was arrested after an eight-day nationwide manhunt involving more than 500 police officers and twelve police services, during which time he was Britain's "most wanted man".

Police discovered notes written by Hobson that showed the murders were premeditated and well-planned, including a "to-do" note detailing how he planned to lure his girlfriend's twin sister to his flat and a shopping list for "big bin liners", tape, tie-wraps, fly spray and air freshener. Against his girlfriend's sister's name he had written "use and abuse at will." The list of planned victims also included his girlfriend's parents and the parents of his ex-wife.

Hobson was tried for the murders in April 2005. Pleading guilty, he was sentenced to four terms of life imprisonment with a recommendation that he should never be released. This was one of the first times that such a recommendation had been made for someone who had admitted their crime at the first opportunity.

== Early life ==
Mark Hobson was born at Manygates Maternity Hospital in Wakefield, West Riding of Yorkshire, on 2 September 1969. The first family home was in Norton Street, Wakefield, where Hobson grew up with his parents Peter and Sandra and his two sisters, Melanie and Leslie. They then moved to Woodhouse Road, Eastmoor. Hobson's father was a coal miner who had started his career at Walton colliery in 1958, and later become deputy and over-manager at the city's Park Hill colliery until its closure in 1982. The family then moved to the Selby area where Hobson's father took work at a local coalfield. Hobson's mother worked as a machinist.

Hobson's childhood was described by his contemporaries as "happy and stable." He attended Heath View Primary School in Eastmoor, Wakefield, and Staynor High School and Brayton High School, Selby. One of his teachers recalled him as "very well behaved... so average and ordinary that he was almost anonymous."

== Later life ==
In 1991, Hobson moved in with his childhood sweetheart and her two children from another relationship. They married in 1993, after the birth of their daughter. Hobson worked at Rigid Paper in Selby and Drax power station and was also a landscape gardener. His wife described him as the "perfect husband". In 1998, Hobson registered as a nightclub doorman and began working at "Kans" nightclub in Market Place, Selby. On New Year's Day 1999, he walked out on his family without giving a reason and began using cannabis. His wife said: "There was no one else involved, he just didn't want married life any more. It was bizarre. I couldn't believe it. He turned to pot and drinking heavily. He never drank when we were married but now he got out of his face. He became like a zombie... His life just went completely off the rails."

== Murders ==
=== Claire Sanderson ===
During the evening of 11 July 2004, he killed his girlfriend Claire Sanderson, 27, in the flat they shared on Millfield Drive, Camblesforth. She was struck on the head seventeen times with a hammer and strangled, after which Hobson wrapped her body in binbags. A plastic bag had also been placed over her head. Subsequent forensic analysis determined that an area of the flat had been cleaned with bleach but Claire had been first attacked in the living room and then taken into the bathroom. There was no evidence of recent sexual activity.

=== Diane Sanderson ===
On 17 July, he telephoned Sanderson's twin sister Diane and told her Claire was ill with glandular fever and wanted her to visit. When Diane arrived at the flat that evening she too was beaten with a hammer after being tortured with a disposable razor and scissors. She had been "hogtied" and her left nipple was completely bitten off. Police believe Hobson may have eaten it. The cause of her death was determined to be strangulation. Her head was also covered with a plastic bag and ligatures were found on her wrists, ankles and neck. Her pubic hair had been shaved and she had been sexually assaulted.

=== James and Joan Britton ===
The next day, he murdered an elderly couple, James and Joan Britton, at their home in Strensall, York.

== Arrest and trial ==
Hobson was arrested at a petrol station on 25 July 2004, in the village of Shipton-by-Beningbrough, near York, following a nationwide manhunt after the attendant recognised him. He was found burrowed between a thornbush and a septic tank behind an upholstery shop. Upon being arrested, Hobson said to the arresting officers "I'm a fucking killer, aren't I?"

Mark Hobson's trial began on 18 April 2005 at Leeds Crown Court for four counts of murder with Paul Worsley as prosecutor. Hobson admitted to all four murders and pleaded guilty. Due to the grisly murders, he was ordered to undergo psychiatric evaluation but was found to be sane and fully culpable for his actions.

During sentencing, Mr. Justice Gregson told Hobson "the enormity of what you've done is beyond words. The damage you've done is incalculable. You not only destroyed the lives of your victims but you devastated the lives of those who loved them." He was sentenced to life imprisonment on 27 May 2005 with a recommendation that he should never be released.

The court was also told that Hobson had stabbed a love rival five times in the chest in a daylight attack in front of shoppers in Selby in 2002, leaving the victim with a punctured lung. Hobson had admitted grievous bodily harm and avoided a prison sentence, instead receiving a community punishment order. This lenient sentence came under much criticism in the light of Hobson's later offending.

== Appeal ==
Hobson lodged an appeal to have a lower minimum sentence set, claiming that he should have been given a more lenient sentence because he had admitted all four murders at the earliest opportunity. He also claimed that no other murderer who admitted their crimes at the first opportunity had ever been recommended for lifelong imprisonment. This was not true, as a similar recommendation had been imposed on child killers Timothy Morss and Brett Tyler in 1996 even though they had admitted their crimes at the earliest opportunity.

The appeal was turned down by the Court of Appeal when Lord Phillips agreed with the trial judge's recommendation, saying that in his opinion, Hobson should never be released, regardless of a guilty plea, since the murders had been so horrific.

== Imprisonment ==
Shortly before this court case, Hobson was placed into solitary confinement for three months after attacking Ian Huntley (a former school caretaker convicted of murdering two girls in Cambridgeshire), and scalding him with a bucket of boiling water. A prison service spokesman said that, due to the nature of high-security prisoners, "it's impossible to prevent incidents of this nature occasionally happening."

In January 2006, letters were released from Wakefield Prison where Hobson blamed alcohol for his killing spree. It had been revealed at Hobson's trial that he was an alcoholic who regularly drank as many as 20 pints a day, and also used other drugs regularly.
