= Andrew Aston =

British murderer (born 1972)

Andrew Simon Aston (born 22 November 1972 in Birmingham, Warwickshire, England) is a convicted British murderer who has the distinction of having received the longest prison sentence ever handed down in England and Wales – 26 concurrent terms of life imprisonment.

Over a period of three months in early 2001, Aston, a cocaine addict, attacked 26 elderly and disabled people in robberies at their homes in Birmingham and parts of neighbouring Sandwell. Two of the victims died as a result of their injuries; 87-year-old George Dale, who died in hospital two weeks after being attacked at his Ladywood home on 16 March, and 80-year-old Frank Hobley, who was also attacked in March 2001 at his home in Stechford and died three months later as a result of his injuries.

His spree began in Smethwick on 12 January 2001, when he robbed a 71-year-old man of £100. By the end of that month, he had robbed a further eight elderly people at different addresses in the town, the oldest being an 85-year-old woman. He committed two further robberies in Smethwick on 9 February 2001. The next day, he robbed a 63-year-old woman in Ladywood before returning to Smethwick and committing two further robberies – both from the homes of elderly people. On 19 February, he robbed a 74-year-old Ladywood woman, three days before he robbed a 90-year-old Smethwick woman in her home. On 25 February, he robbed a 60-year-old Smethwick man of £80 before heading to Tipton and robbing an 86-year-old man of £200. He continued his spree up to the end of March 2001, committing a further nine attacks and robberies against elderly people, before he was finally arrested on 31 March while assaulting and attempting to rob a 92-year-old Sheldon man.

Aston was first questioned about the attack on George Dale three days after it happened. Mrs Dale's wife Betty, 86 at the time, was also injured in the attack but survived.

Aston was charged with multiple thefts and assaults after his initial arrest. He was charged with the murder of George Dale on 5 April 2001, and later with that of Frank Hobley following his death in hospital in June 2001. He was subsequently charged with a total of two murders and 24 lesser offences against his victims who had survived his attacks.

By the time he went on trial in January 2002, six people who had survived his attacks had died, while another six were too frail to give evidence against him in court.

He was found guilty of two murders and a further 24 charges of assault and robbery at Birmingham Crown Court on 20 February 2002, for which he received 26 life sentences. No recommended minimum term was reported at the time, and whether a fixed minimum term has been set by the Home Office or High Court since has not been reported, although media sources at the time suggested that Aston was unlikely to be released for a very long time, if ever.
