= Ten Lifestyle Group =

Travel and holiday companies of the United Kingdom

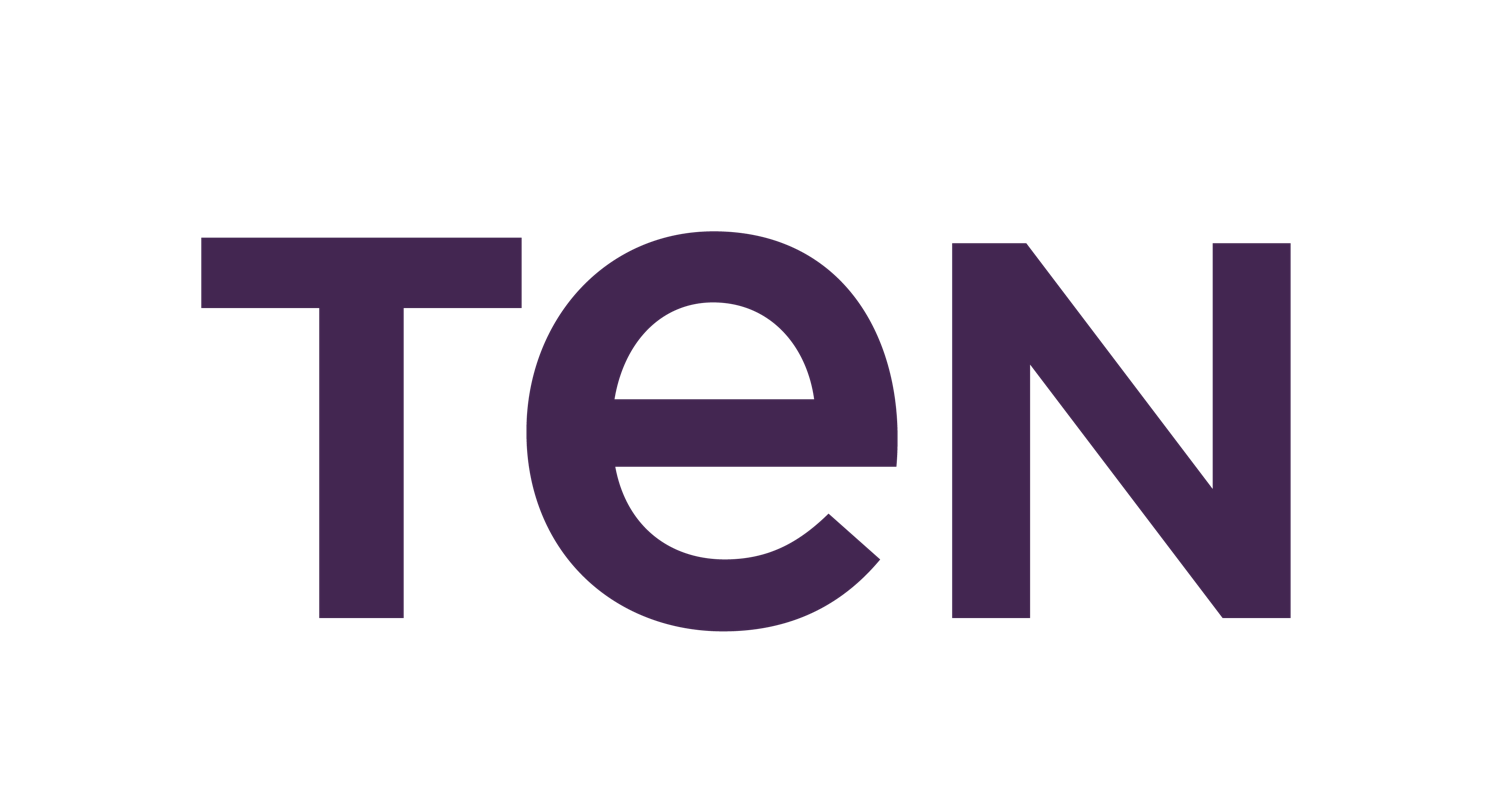
- Type: Public
- Industry: Concierge
- Founded: 1998; 28 years ago in London
- Founder: Alex Cheatle, Andrew Long
- Headquarters: London, United Kingdom
- Area served: Global
- Key people: Alex Cheatle, CEO
- Services: Concierge and Lifestyle Management services
- Members: 2 million+ (registered)
- Number of employees: 1000+
- Website: www.tenlifestylesgroup.com

Ten Lifestyle Group (also known as Ten Group or Ten Concierge) is a global travel and lifestyle concierge (also known as lifestyle management) company founded in 1998 by Alex Cheatle and Andrew Long. The company's headquarters is based in London with 22 global offices in major cities including New York, Dubai, Hong Kong, Singapore and Tokyo. Alex Cheatle is the company's Chief Executive Officer (CEO).

== History ==
Ten was founded in London in 1998. The business began as a company providing lifestyle concierge services to 20 members in London, growing as the number of requests increased.

In 2001, Ten won its first corporate contract to provide concierge services on behalf of a major UK banking group including Coutts.

In 2017, Ten was admitted to the London Stock Exchange's secondary market (AIM: TENG) at a value of 134.0 pence per share. During the roadshows, Ten raised £18 million valuing the company at £104.8 million. Institutional investors currently include Lombard Odier, Canaccord Genuity Wealth Management, Gresham House Asset Management as well as other blue chip institutions.

Ten currently has more than 2 million registered private and corporate individuals around the world, who are serviced by a workforce of over 1,000 in all key jurisdictions, 24/7, 365 days a year.

Operations

Ten Lifestyle Group provides 24/7 concierge services to its private and corporate members. Clients are able to book travel tickets, secure reservations at restaurants, access specialist event planning and personal shopping, and book various entertainment including music, theatre and sporting events worldwide.

Digital Platform

In 2014, Ten developed its digital platform. Members are able to search for and book tables, sports, theatre and music tickets, and plan holidays through the platform.

B-Corp Certification

In April 2023, Ten successfully secured B Corp certification and the first on the AIM of the London Stock Market.
