= Killing of Richard Whelan =

2005 stabbing on a London bus

On 29 July 2005, Richard Whelan was stabbed to death in Islington, London, United Kingdom, by a man who had been mistakenly released from custody that day.

== Background ==
On 18 May 2005, Anthony Joseph was arrested by Merseyside Police in North West England for burglary. He was charged and bailed by Liverpool magistrates to live at his Islington, North London address. On 10 June, he was arrested by Surrey Police for abduction and unlawful sex with a 15-year-old girl. He was charged and remanded to Forest Bank Young Offender Institution in Pendlebury, Greater Manchester. He should have been at a hearing in Liverpool in relation to the burglary, but arrangement had not been made for him to attend. The court issues a warrant for his arrest and the hearing was rearranged for 3 August. The abduction and unlawful sex charges are dropped, and he was mistakenly released at 1:45pm on 29 July by Forest Bank staff who were unaware of the burglary case.

== Stabbing ==
At 9:45pm on 29 July 2005, 28-year-old Richard Whelan and his long-term girlfriend boarded a N43 bus on Holloway Road, Islington. They and 20-year-old Joseph, who was under the influence of crack cocaine, had boarded the bus at the same stop, were on the top deck when, very soon after, Joseph threw chips at another female passenger, then at Whelan's girlfriend. After Whelan told Joseph to stop doing that, Joseph stabbed him seven times. Joseph walked off along Holloway Road. Whelan died of his injuries in Whittington Hospital in Archway.

== Trials ==
Joseph was tried at the Old Bailey in Central London for Whelan's murder twice in 2007. The jury at both trials failed to reach a verdict, so prosecutors accepted his plea of guilty to manslaughter on the grounds of diminished responsibility. He has paranoid schizophrenia and was sentenced to an indefinite term at a mental health unit. In 2008, the Home Office carried out an inquiry into why Forest Bank released Joseph when there was a warrant for his arrest.

== See also ==
- Murder of Anthony Walker, also in England, on the same evening
