= Murder of Daniel Handley =

1994 British murder in England

Daniel Handley
- Born: Daniel Charles Handley; 27 April 1985
- Died: c. 2 October 1994 (aged 9); Hungerford, Berkshire, England
- Cause of death: Strangulation
- Body discovered: Bradley Stoke, South Gloucestershire, March 1995

On 2 October 1994, nine-year-old Daniel Charles Handley was abducted from a street near his home in East London. He was sexually assaulted before being strangled near Hungerford in Berkshire, after which his body was dumped in Bradley Stoke near Bristol.

In 1996, Timothy Morss and Brett Tyler were later sentenced to life imprisonment for abducting, sexually assaulting, and murdering Handley. The couple, along with two others, received fifty-year tariffs imposed by Home Secretary David Blunkett in 2002.

== The crime ==
Daniel Charles Handley (27 April 1985 – 2 October 1994) was fixing a chain on his bicycle in Beckton, East London, on 2 October 1994, when he was approached by two men in a Peugeot 405. The men – boyfriends Timothy John Morss and Brett Tyler (born 21 June 1965) – had been cruising the area looking for a young, pre-teen, fair-haired boy to make real their fantasy of abducting such a boy, sexually abusing him and then murdering him. The driver of the car claimed to be lost, and asked Handley to show him directions on a map. The map was placed across the back seat of the car and, when Daniel leaned inside to look at it, one of the men pushed him into the car and the other drove them off. They drove Handley to a flat, where each man sexually abused him in turn while the other taped the activity with a camcorder. Afterwards, they took Handley to a layby near Hungerford in Berkshire, where he was again sexually abused before being strangled to death with a car tow rope.

Handley's killers dumped his body in a shallow grave near a golf course close to Morss's home in Bradley Stoke, near Bristol, before returning later to bury it deeper. His skull was found in March 1995, after it had been disturbed by foxes.

== Trial ==
The pair were found guilty of Handley's murder at the Old Bailey on 17 May 1996. They were sentenced to life imprisonment by the trial judge, who condemned them as "vultures" and recommended they receive whole life tariffs. After their trial, it was revealed that the pair were serial child sex offenders who had also abused children in the Philippines.

The pair had met while incarcerated at Wormwood Scrubs Prison during the early 1990s for child sex offences. Morss was convicted of raping two young boys in 1986, and had his seven-year sentence cut to five on 2 November 1986. Tyler had been arrested for indecency with young boys and sentenced to four years in prison.

Morss lived in Bradley Stoke on the outskirts of Bristol where he co-owned and ran a minicab firm. Morss and Tyler fled to the Philippines after Handley's death, but when Morss returned to England, Handley's body had been found and he was quickly arrested on suspicion of murder. Tyler had to be extradited back to England to stand trial. One of the killers later recalled "the feeling of sexual excitement when I grabbed his body and pushed him into the car, the fear of being caught and the excitement that we might get away with it. It was like a fantasy."

== Sentencing changes ==
On 24 November 2002, the pair were two of four child murderers (the others being Howard Hughes and Roy Whiting) who received 50-year tariffs imposed by Home Secretary David Blunkett, effectively meaning that they will remain in prison until at least 2045 and the ages of 82 and 80 respectively. However, this system was declared illegal within 24 hours by the European Court of Human Rights as well as the High Court for England and Wales, following a legal challenge by convicted double murderer Anthony Anderson. The final decision on a life sentence prisoner's minimum term now rests with the High Court following a recommendation by the trial judge.

== See also ==
- List of kidnappings
- List of solved missing person cases
