= Soham murders =

2002 double murder in Cambridgeshire, England

Jessica Chapman Holly Wells
- Jessica Chapman (left) and Holly Wells (right), mid-2002
- Born: Jessica Amiee Chapman; Holly Marie Wells; Chapman: 1 September 1991; Wells: 4 October 1991; Both: Soham, Cambridgeshire, England
- Died: Both: c. 4 August 2002 (aged 10); Soham, Cambridgeshire, England
- Body discovered: 17 August 2002; Lakenheath, Suffolk, England
- Resting place: Soham Cemetery, Cambridgeshire, England
- Known for: Victims of child murder

On 4 August 2002, two 10-year-old girls, Holly Marie Wells and Jessica Amiee Chapman, were lured into the home of a local resident and school caretaker, Ian Huntley, in Soham, Cambridgeshire, England. Both children were murdered – most likely by asphyxiation – and their bodies disposed of in an irrigation ditch close to RAF Lakenheath in Suffolk. The bodies were discovered on 17 August 2002.

Huntley was convicted of the murder of both girls on 17 December 2003 and sentenced to two terms of life imprisonment, with the High Court later imposing a minimum term of 40 years. His girlfriend, Maxine Ann Carr – the girls' teaching assistant – had knowingly provided Huntley with a false alibi. She received a three-and-a-half-year prison sentence for conspiring with Huntley to pervert the course of justice. Huntley died in March 2026, after sustaining serious head injuries inflicted in an attack alleged to have been carried out by another inmate at HMP Frankland.

The search for Wells and Chapman in the thirteen days following their disappearance has been described as one of the most intense and extensive in British criminal history.

== Disappearance ==
At 11:45 am on Sunday, 4 August 2002, Jessica Chapman left her home on Brook Street, Soham, for a barbecue at the home of her best friend, Holly Wells, in nearby Redhouse Gardens. Prior to leaving her home, Chapman told her parents she was going to give her friend a necklace engraved with the letter "H" that she had purchased for her on a recent family holiday to Menorca.

The two girls, together with their friend Natalie Parr, spent about half an hour playing computer games and listening to music before Parr returned home. By 3:15 pm, both had changed into distinctive replica Manchester United football shirts: one belonging to Wells, and the other to her older brother, Oliver. At 5:04 pm, Wells's mother photographed the pair before they ate dinner with the other guests. They then returned upstairs, where they browsed the Internet and sent several emails between 5:11 pm and 5:32 pm.

At approximately 6:05 p.m., the girls left the Wells residence without informing anyone, intending to buy sweets from a vending machine at the Ross Peers Sports Centre. While walking back to 4 Redhouse Gardens, they passed the College Close home of Ian Huntley, the senior caretaker at the local secondary school. Huntley lured them inside by claiming that his girlfriend Maxine Carr – their teaching assistant at St Andrew's Primary School – was in the house, although she was in fact visiting her mother in Grimsby, Lincolnshire.

The precise sequence of events after the girls entered 5 College Close remains unknown. Investigators believe that certain elements of Huntley's subsequent public statements to the media, and later claims made during his trial testimony – including assertions that he had been washing his dog when the girls passed at around 6:30 pm, and that one had suffered a mild nosebleed – may contain fragments of truth. The cause of death for both girls was later determined to be asphyxiation. Chapman's Nokia 6110 mobile phone was switched off at 6:46 pm.

At 8 pm, Nicola Wells went to her daughter's bedroom to invite the girls to say goodbye to her guests, only to discover that both were missing. She and her husband, Kevin, searched the house and surrounding streets. Minutes after their daughter's 8:30 pm curfew had passed, Nicola Wells telephoned the Chapman household, learning that Leslie and Sharon Chapman were themselves concerned that their youngest daughter had not returned home. Following frantic efforts by both families to locate the girls, Wells and Chapman were reported missing by their parents at 9:55 pm.

== Search and discovery ==
Police immediately launched an intensive search for the missing children. More than 400 officers were assigned full-time to search for the girls. These officers conducted extensive house-to-house enquiries across Soham; their efforts to search local terrain were supported by hundreds of local volunteers and, later, by United States Air Force personnel stationed at nearby airbases. (Note: The total population of Soham in 2002 was 8,700.)

To support their public appeals for information, Cambridgeshire Police released the photograph Nicola Wells had taken of the children less than two hours before their disappearance, depicting both girls wearing their Manchester United replica football shirts. A physical description of each girl was also released to the media, stating that both were white, about 4 ft 6 in (137 cm) tall, and slim. Chapman was described as tanned, with shoulder-length brown hair; Wells was described as fair, with blonde hair.

The parents of both girls said their daughters had been wary of talking to strangers, having been warned from early childhood not to trust people they did not know. This was supported by the headteacher of St Andrew's Primary School, who told reporters: "The possible danger from strangers is something we have impressed upon [the children] from an early age."

Investigators stated on 7 August they strongly believed the children had been abducted, and questioned every registered sex offender in Cambridgeshire and neighbouring Lincolnshire. More than 260 registered sex offenders across the UK – including 15 high-risk paedophiles – were also questioned; all were eliminated from the investigation. Police also examined the possibility that the girls had arranged to meet someone they had contacted via an Internet chat room, but this was soon ruled out.

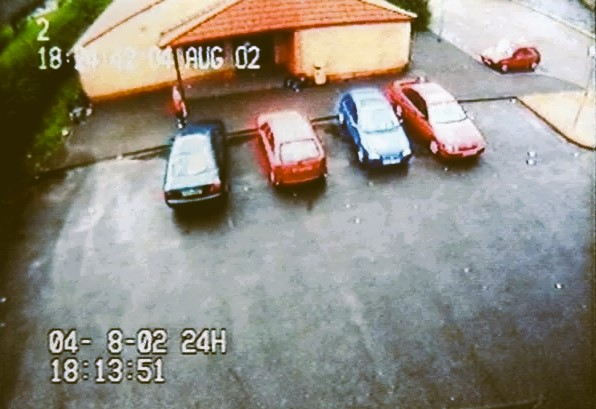
CCTV footage of Wells and Chapman (upper left), released to the media on 8 August

The community held a candlelight vigil on 7 August. The following day, CCTV footage of the girls, recorded minutes before their disappearance, was released to the public. This footage depicted them arriving at the local sports centre at 6:28 pm (Note: Investigators were able to obtain extensive footage of the children's movements following their departure from the Wells household. The last piece of footage of Wells and Chapman depicts the children walking onto a car park on the grounds of Soham Village College.) A televised reconstruction of the children's last known movements was broadcast nationally on 10 August, and both sets of parents granted an interview with presenter Colin Baker on ITV's current affairs programme Tonight, which was broadcast on 12 August. Other family members and friends of both girls also appealed via the media for the safe return of the children. These appeals for information on the whereabouts of Wells and Chapman produced more than 2,000 phone calls and tips from the public, with all information obtained entered into the investigation's HOLMES 2 database. (Note: Huntley was present at one of the press conferences in which the parents of Wells and Chapman pleaded for the safe return of their daughters. On this occasion, he offered his condolences to the father of Wells, stating: "Kevin, I'm so sorry. I didn't realise it was your daughter".)

Shortly after the children's disappearance, Staffordshire Police contacted the investigating officers to report their suspicions the girls could have been abducted by the same man responsible for an abduction in their jurisdiction the previous year, in which a six-year-old girl had survived an indecent assault by an abductor who was still at large. This offender drove a green Ford Mondeo with number plates which had earlier been stolen in Peterborough. The person responsible for this abduction and assault was also believed to have followed a 12-year-old girl in the same area, although, in this instance, his car had been fitted with number plates which had been stolen in Nottinghamshire. The same vehicle had recently been sighted in Glatton, Cambridgeshire. This information was later included in a televised appeal about the children's disappearance on the BBC's Crimewatch, but the lead did not result in any significant developments.

=== Sightings ===
Several members of the public reported having seen the children in the early days of the investigation. Mark Tuck informed investigators that, as he had driven past the girls on Sand Street in Soham town centre at approximately 6:30 pm on 4 August, his attention had been drawn to their Manchester United replica shirts, prompting him to remark to his wife, Lucy: "Look! There's two little Beckhams over there." A young woman named Karen Greenwood reported seeing the girls walking "arm in arm" along College Road approximately two minutes later. Another woman living in nearby Little Thetford claimed to have seen two girls whose appearance and clothing matched those of Wells and Chapman walking past her home the following morning. Police also received statements regarding a suspicious white van seen in Soham on the evening of the children's disappearance. Investigators located and seized this vehicle from a caravan park in Wentworth on 7 August, but the lead proved fruitless.

On 12 August, police launched an appeal to trace the driver of a four-door, dark green saloon car, possibly a Peugeot 405 or Vauxhall Vectra. A taxi driver stated he had seen the driver "thrashing his arms" as he struggled with two young girls inside the vehicle while travelling on the A142 south of Soham towards Newmarket around the time the girls were last seen. The vehicle was last observed turning into the Studlands Park housing estate.

The following evening, a jogger alerted police to two mounds of recently disturbed earth he had seen at Warren Hill, just outside Newmarket, which he speculated might have been the burial sites of the two girls. An overnight examination revealed them to be badger setts.

One person who claimed to have spoken with the girls immediately before their disappearance was 28-year-old Huntley, who informed investigators on 5 August he had had a brief conversation with both girls on his doorstep the previous afternoon. (Note: Huntley's precise motivation for voluntarily informing police of his encountering the children outside his home is unknown; it is speculated he chose to do so out of concerns eyewitnesses may have seen him engaging in conversation with the girls outside his home.) According to Huntley, Wells and Chapman – both "happy as Larry" – had briefly enquired as to whether his partner, Carr, had been successful in a recent application for a full-time teaching assistant position at their school. When he had replied Carr had not obtained the role, one of the girls had said, "Tell her we're sorry" before they both walked along College Street towards a bridge leading to Clay Street.

Police were suspicious of Huntley's account. A single police officer searched his house on 5 August. No incriminating evidence was found, but the officer noticed items of clothing on the washing line despite the fact it had been raining. In reference to the evident extensive cleaning of the house's interior, Huntley said: "Excuse the dining room. We had a flood." (Note: Investigators would later determine Wells and Chapman had most likely been attacked — and possibly murdered — in the dining room of College Close.) The officer was unconvinced by Huntley's explanation and suspicious of his agitated demeanour. Huntley remained a strong suspect.

On 6 August, Huntley drove from Soham to Grimsby to pick up Carr. Shortly before the two returned to College Close, a neighbour of Carr's mother, Marion Clift, saw the couple standing at the rear of their vehicle with the boot open. According to Clift, a "pale, shaking" Huntley stared into the boot for several moments, while Carr stood beside him, her head bowed, weeping. When Huntley became aware of Clift's presence, he abruptly closed the boot.

I don't know the girls. I was stood on the front doorstep grooming my dog down. She'd run away and come back a bit of a mess ... they just came across and asked how [Maxine] was ... I just said she weren't very good as she hadn't got the job and they just says please tell her that we're very sorry and off they walked, in the direction of the library over there.

— Ian Huntley, interviewed by Sky News correspondent Jeremy Thompson. 15 August 2002

=== Discoveries ===
At about 12:30 pm on 17 August, a 48-year-old gamekeeper, Keith Pryer, discovered the bodies of both girls lying side by side in a 5-foot (1.5 m) deep irrigation ditch close to a pheasant pen near the perimeter fence of RAF Lakenheath in Suffolk, more than 10 miles (16 km) east of Soham. Pryer had noticed what he later described as an "unusual and unpleasant smell" in the area several days earlier; when returning with two friends on 17 August, he decided to investigate its cause. Walking through an overgrown verge about 600 yards (550 m) from a partially tarmacked road, Pryer and one of his companions, Adrian Lawrence, discovered the children's bodies. Lawrence turned to his girlfriend, Helen Sawyer, and shouted: "Don't come any closer, Helen! Get back in the van!" He immediately reported the discoveries to police.

The girls had been missing for thirteen days when their bodies were found, and their charred remains were in an advanced state of decomposition. (Note: Ian Huntley would admit at his trial he had set fire to both bodies using petrol, presumably in an attempt to destroy forensic evidence.) No clear footprints were discovered at the crime scene. (Note: Huntley later told investigators he had taped bin liners around his feet before carrying the children's bodies from his vehicle to the irrigation ditch.)

Investigators quickly concluded who the two victims were likely to be, and that they had not died at the location where their bodies were discovered. Numerous hairs later determined to belong to Chapman were discovered on a tree branch close to the location of the bodies.

The following day, Cambridgeshire Deputy Chief Constable Keith Hodder issued a press statement confirming the discovery of the children's bodies. He added that both families had been informed and that, although positive formal identification would take several days, investigators were as "certain as [they] possibly could be" the bodies were those of Wells and Chapman.

=== Identification ===
On 21 August, both bodies were identified via DNA testing. Nine days later, a public memorial service was held at Ely Cathedral for the girls. About 2,000 people attended, including the girls' classmates, teachers, and the six family liaison officers who had provided 24-hour support for both families. The Reverend Tim Alban Jones officiated at this service, saying: "Would not the best and most lasting memorial to these two lovely young girls be a change for the better in how we behave towards each other? Today's service is a small milestone in our shared journey of grief and sorrow ... it is our hope that we may perhaps draw a line under one phase of our grieving and begin to look forward."

An online book of condolence attracted more than 31,000 messages of grief and sympathy, and on 24 August, football clubs across Britain held a minute's silence before games.

=== Inquest ===
The inquest into the children's deaths was held at Shire Hall, Cambridge, on 23 August 2002. Coroner David Morris stated that the bodies of both girls were partially skeletonised and that no precise cause of death could be determined for either of them. He concluded that the most likely cause of death for both girls had been asphyxiation. Morris added that the girls had almost certainly not died at the location where their bodies had been found, and that both bodies had been placed there within 24 hours of their deaths. (Note: Huntley would later inform investigators that he had waited for nightfall before opting to drive to RAF Lakenheath to dispose of the girls' bodies. He further elaborated that a deciding factor to dispose of the bodies in this particular location had been that RAF Lakenheath was just two miles from the home of his disabled grandmother, and that if eyewitnesses spotted his vehicle, he could falsely claim his purpose for being in this vicinity had been his decision to visit his grandmother.) These conclusions were supported by an analysis of the nettle shoots at the scene, which enabled forensic ecologist and palynologist Patricia Wiltshire to estimate that the bodies had been deposited at this location almost two weeks earlier.

=== Funerals ===
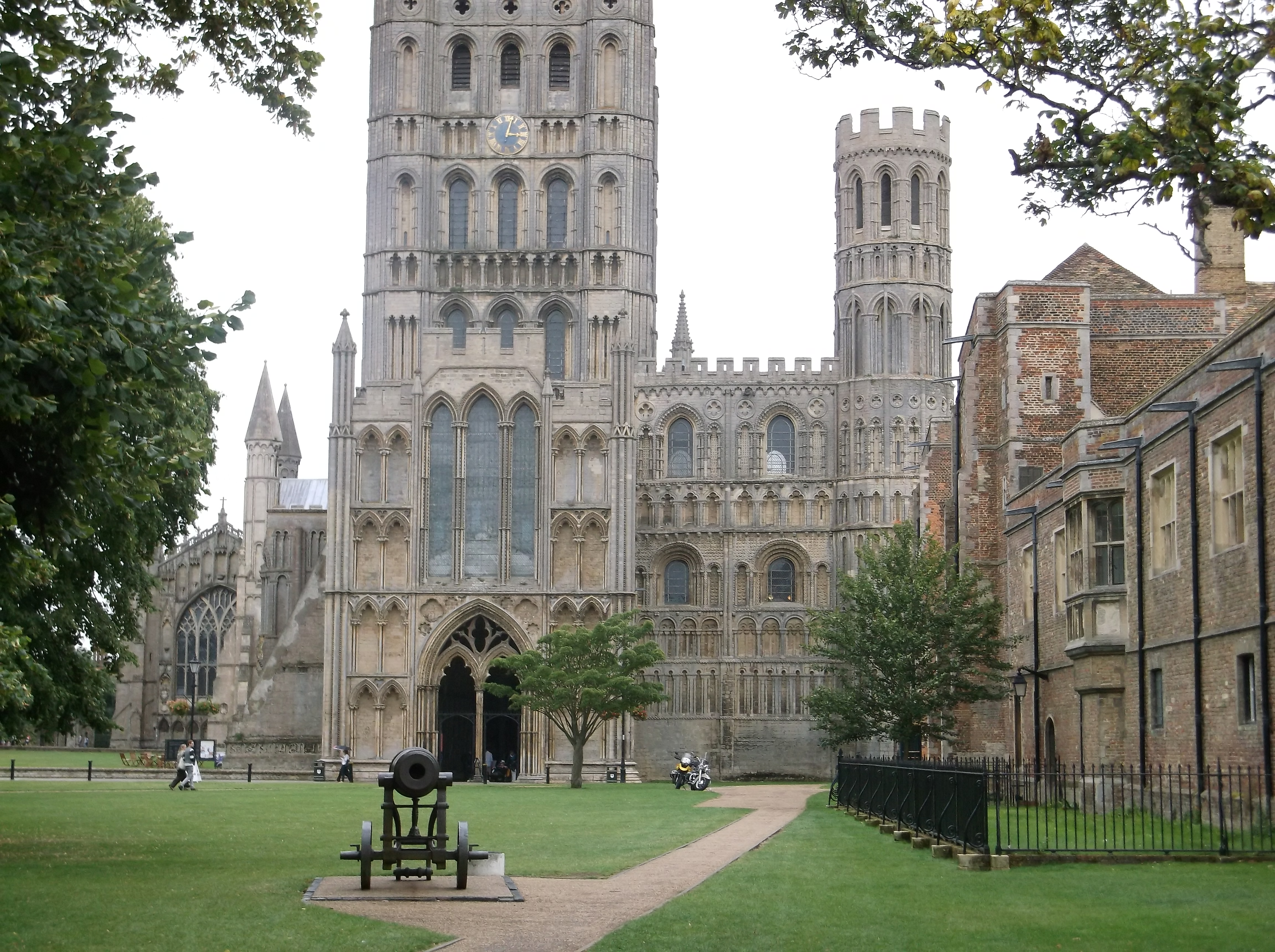
A service for the children was held at Ely Cathedral on 30 August 2002.

The funeral services for Wells and Chapman were held on consecutive days in September 2002. Both services took place at St Andrew's parish church and were officiated by Tim Alban Jones. The girls were buried in adjacent graves in Soham's Fordham Road Cemetery, following ceremonies attended only by family members and close friends. At the request of both families, the media refrained from reporting on either service.

== Police investigation ==
In the weeks following the disappearances, Huntley reluctantly granted several television interviews to media outlets such as Sky News and the regional BBC News programme, BBC Look East, speaking of the general shock in the local community and his dismay at being the last person to see the children alive.

By the second week of the children's disappearance, Huntley had become an unofficial spokesman for the community of Soham. His explanation for this was that he wanted to convey to the media the frustration and despair the community was feeling. In one interview with Sky News correspondent Jeremy Thompson during the second week of the search, he claimed to be holding on to a "glimmer of hope" the children would be found safe and well, and that he had last seen the girls walking in the direction of a local library.

Carr was also interviewed by the press during the second week of the search for the children. In this live interview, Carr corroborated Huntley's claims to have conversed with the children on their doorstep as she had been bathing before both girls had walked away from their doorstep, adding: "I only wish we had asked them where they were going ... if only we knew then what we know now. Then we could have stopped them, or done something about it."

Discussing the personalities of the girls, Carr described Wells as being the "more feminine" of the two, adding that Chapman was "more of a tomboy" and that on one occasion, she had jokingly remarked to Chapman how, unlike many of her friends, she seldom wore a skirt. To this question, Carr stated that the child had expressed her desire to be a bridesmaid at her own future wedding, adding Chapman had said she would willingly wear a dress for such an occasion. Carr also displayed a thank-you card to this reporter which had recently been given to her by Wells on the last day of the school year. Referring to Wells in the past tense, Carr stated, "She was just lovely, really lovely", before making a direct appeal to the children: "Just get on the phone and just come home. Or if somebody's got them, just let them go." (Note: Carr's decision to corroborate Huntley's lies to investigators and media in the early stages of the police investigation briefly resulted in police discounting Huntley as a suspect before eyewitness accounts of Carr's whereabouts on 4 August and a search of mobile phone and telephone records proved the falsity of her claims.)

By the second week of the children's disappearance, Huntley had begun to lose weight and was displaying visible symptoms of insomnia. To one officer, he said: "You think I've done it? I was the last person to see them!" before beginning to weep. His erratic behaviour and apparent distress led to him being prescribed anti-depressants on 13 August.

=== Suspicions ===
Having participated in the search for the children, Huntley regularly asked police officers questions such as how their investigation was progressing and how long DNA evidence could survive before deteriorating. One of these officers observed three vertical scratches on Huntley's left jaw, each measuring approximately three centimetres (1.2 in), which he claimed had been recently inflicted by his dog.

On 16 August, twelve days after the children's disappearance, Huntley and Carr were first questioned by police. Both were questioned for approximately seven hours. Each gave witness statements before being placed in a safe house in the village of Histon. By this date, police had received information from several Grimsby residents who had recognised Huntley in the television interviews he had given, and recalled that he had been accused of rape several years earlier. Others said that, contrary to her televised claims, Carr had been socialising in Grimsby town centre on the night of the girls' disappearance, and was not at home in Soham as she had claimed to the media.

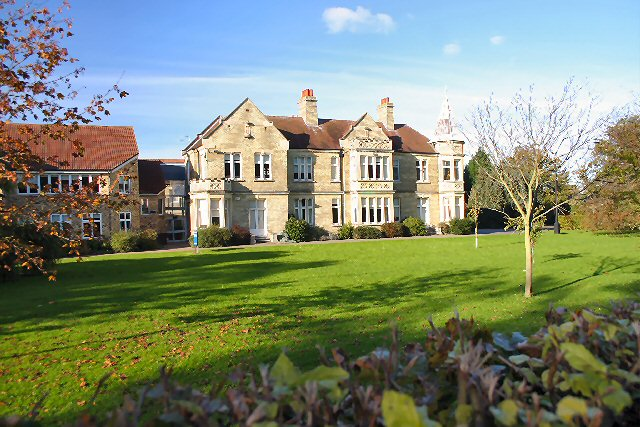
Police discovered charred remnants of the children's clothes at Soham Village College on 16 August.

The same evening, police conducted a thorough search of both 5 College Close and the grounds of Soham Village College where Huntley worked as a senior caretaker as the couple remained under police watch at separate locations outside Soham. Each room of Huntley's home had evidently been recently and meticulously cleaned with what was later described as being a "lemony" cleaning fluid, but the search of the home revealed many items of "major importance" to the investigation. The evidence and artefacts were not made public at the time, but the items recovered from the school grounds included items of clothing the girls had been wearing when last seen; their charred and cut Manchester United shirts were recovered from a bin in a hangar at Huntley's place of work. (Note: Huntley had attempted to burn these clothes in the late evening of 4 August; the accelerant he used had caused a blaze which he believed might attract attention, causing him to quickly extinguish the fire.) Fibres recovered from these garments were a precise match to samples retrieved from Huntley's body and clothing, as well as from 5 College Close. His fingerprints were recovered from the bin.

Huntley's Ford Fiesta was also forensically examined on 16 August. This revealed that the car had also been recently, extensively cleaned, but traces of a mixture of brick dust, chalk and concrete of the same type used to pave the road leading to where the girls' bodies were discovered were found around the wheel arches and on and around the pedals. A cover from the rear seat was missing, and the lining of the boot had been recently removed and replaced with an ill-fitting section of household carpet. (Note: Investigators later discovered that a week before his arrest, Huntley had taken his car to an Ely garage to have the vehicle's tyres changed. Using a false identity, he had paid a mechanic £10 to place a false registration number on the receipt for this purchase.)

=== Arrest ===
Having discovered the children's clothes at Soham Village College, police arrested Huntley and Carr on suspicion of abduction and murder at 4:30 am on 17 August, eight hours before the discovery of the girls' bodies.

During initial questioning, Huntley refused to answer questions and appeared evasive, confused, and emotionally detached, occasionally drooling during police attempts to question him in an effort to feign mental illness. This left police with no option but to refer Huntley to a mental hospital to undergo an extensive psychological evaluation.

Carr quickly confessed to detectives she had lied about her whereabouts and her partner's actions on 4 August, explaining that shortly before she had returned to Soham from Grimsby on 6 August, Huntley claimed to her in a phone call to have seen the two girls shortly before their disappearance, admitting: "The thing is, Maxine, they came in our house!" According to Carr, Huntley informed her that the children had entered their home so that Wells could staunch her nosebleed. He then claimed to her that Chapman had sat on their bed as he helped Wells control the bleeding from her nose before both girls left their home.

Referencing one of the 1998 rapes he had committed, but had earlier claimed to her to have been falsely accused of in this phone call, Huntley then began voicing concerns as to again being falsely accused of involvement on this occasion, claiming that his previous arrest had caused him to suffer a nervous breakdown. Carr therefore later agreed to concoct a false story with her partner to support his version of events.

After being informed of the discovery of the children's bodies and the evidence of Huntley's guilt, including his fingerprints being recovered from the bin in which the children's clothes had been found, Carr burst into tears, shouting: "No! He can't have been! It can't have been! He hasn't done it!" Despite these revelations, Carr initially remained emotionally attached to Huntley and professed her belief in his innocence to both the police and her family.

== Formal charges ==
By 20 August, investigators had established sufficient physical evidence from Huntley's home, vehicle and Soham Village College to charge him with two counts of murder. He was charged with these offences while detained for observation at Rampton Secure Hospital in Nottinghamshire, and all preliminary hearings against him were postponed until the conclusion of his mental health assessment. Carr was also charged with attempting to pervert the course of justice on this date, but not with murder as police and prosecutors had discounted the possibility she had been directly involved in the actual murders. (Note: At this hearing, Carr was informed by Principal Crown Prosecutor Marion Bastin this charge carried a maximum sentence of life imprisonment. On hearing this, Carr slumped forward.) She was further charged with two counts of assisting an offender on 16 January 2003.

While held on remand at Holloway Prison, Carr regularly enquired as to Huntley's welfare, and wrote several letters in which she professed her continued love for him. Carr severed contact with Huntley in December 2002.

=== Pre-trial assessments ===
To determine Huntley's state of mental health, he was detained under Section 48 of the Mental Health Act for almost two months at Rampton Secure Hospital. His mental state was assessed by Christopher Clark, a consultant forensic psychiatrist, to determine whether he suffered from any form of mental illness and whether he was mentally competent to stand trial. Clark concluded in October that, although psychopathic, Huntley did not suffer from any major mental or psychotic illness. On 8 October, Huntley was deemed mentally competent to stand trial.

Although Mr Huntley made clear attempts to appear insane, I have no doubt that the man currently, and at the time of the murders, was both physically and mentally sound and therefore, if he is found guilty, carried out the murders totally aware of his actions.

— Christopher Clark, consultant forensic psychiatrist, reciting the conclusions of his assessment of Ian Huntley's mental state (2002)

Having been declared mentally fit to stand trial, Huntley was faced with a sentence of life imprisonment if a jury could be convinced of his guilt. He was transferred to a segregation unit at Woodhill prison in Milton Keynes, Buckinghamshire. On 9 June 2003, he attempted suicide by taking 29 antidepressants which he had accumulated in his cell. Staff initially feared Huntley might die as a result of this overdose, but he was returned to his prison cell within 48 hours. Huntley was later transferred to London's Belmarsh prison.

At a preliminary hearing at the Old Bailey on 16 April 2003, Huntley pleaded not guilty to the charges of murdering Wells and Chapman, and guilty to the charge both stood accused of: conspiracy to pervert the course of justice. Carr pleaded not guilty to the charges of attempting to pervert the course of justice, of assisting an offender, and conspiring to pervert the course of justice.

== Trial ==
The trial of Huntley for the murders of Wells and Chapman opened at the Old Bailey on 5 November 2003 before Mr Justice Alan Moses; Huntley was charged with two counts of murder, to which he entered a plea of not guilty. Carr was charged with two counts of assisting an offender and one count of perverting the course of justice.

In his opening statement on behalf of the Crown, prosecutor Richard Latham QC described the last day of the girls' lives and how, by "pure chance", they had happened to pass by Huntley's home at a time when Carr was not present. Latham contended Huntley had deliberately lured them into his home at approximately 6:37 pm, and that both had been murdered shortly thereafter, with cell site analysis showing Huntley had switched off Chapman's mobile phone either outside his home or within the grounds of Soham Village College after both girls had been murdered. Latham described how mobile phone records and eyewitness accounts placed Carr in Grimsby on the evening in question, showing the statements she had given to police and press had been false. He then outlined the details of how Keith Pryer and his two friends had discovered the bodies on 17 August at a location Huntley had known from his plane-spotting hobby and where they were unlikely to be discovered.

Referencing the likely motive for the girls' murder and the cause of death of each victim, Latham stated that, owing to the extensive state of decomposition of the bodies, the coroner had been unable to determine the precise cause of death of either child, or whether they had been sexually assaulted before or after death. Latham stated neither body showed signs of compressive neck injuries, knife wounds, drugging or poisoning, and that both girls had most likely died of asphyxiation.

In reference to Huntley's claims that both girls' deaths had been accidental, Latham stated that "only one person knows what happened" after they entered his home. He stressed that the cause of death was murder, adding: "Ten-year-old girls don't just drop dead." In reference to Carr's attempts to pervert the course of justice, Latham stated that "as surely as night follows day" the two had conspired to concoct a false alibi to divert suspicion from Huntley, but emphasised to the jury that Carr could be convicted of assisting an offender only if they believed she had known Huntley had murdered the girls, adding that her motive for telling lies to police with reference to the charge of perverting the course of justice was irrelevant.

Over the course of three days, Latham outlined the efforts of both defendants to divert suspicion away from Huntley, and Huntley's own efforts to destroy all physical and circumstantial evidence linking him to the crime, but despite these efforts, investigators had retrieved enough evidence to show the girls had been murdered within his home and – within approximately twelve hours of their deaths – transported in his vehicle to the location where their bodies were discovered on 17 August. This had included fibre evidence retrieved from Huntley's vehicle, clothes and carpets which had been a "precise match" to the Manchester United shirts the girls had been wearing at the time of their disappearance. Latham then closed his statement by again bringing the jury's attention to Huntley's claim that both deaths had been accidental, remarking, "We pose this question: two of them?" He then speculated Huntley's defence counsel may try to argue that he had been confused, commenting: "In that case, they would have to consider [Huntley's] behaviour over the fortnight between the girls' disappearance and their bodies being found."

Testimony relating to the forensic evidence linking Huntley was heard on 24 November. On this date, a forensic scientist, Helen Davey, testified about the biological evidence recovered from the girls' clothing, footwear and a dishcloth discovered in the hangar at Soham Village College on 16 August. Davey testified she had found minute traces of blood and saliva on these objects, but no positive traces of semen. She explained the reason for the lack of any traces of semen being discovered could have been a result of the charred and melted condition of the articles she had inspected. A scenes of crime officer also testified that, despite Huntley's exhaustive efforts to remove physical evidence of his crime from his home, a forensic examination had revealed several traces of blood spattering about the hallway and main entrance to the master bedroom.

On 1 December, Huntley testified before the court in his defence. Responding to questioning by his defence counsel, Stephen Coward QC, Huntley admitted both girls had died in his house but denied that either death had been intentional. According to Huntley, he, Wells and Chapman had entered his bathroom to stem a mild nosebleed Wells had been suffering when the girls had walked by his home. The bath was already filled with water as he had been cleaning his dog that afternoon.

In the bathroom, he had slipped and accidentally knocked Wells into his bath while helping her staunch her nosebleed, and this unintentional act had caused her to drown as he "panicked and froze". He further claimed Chapman had witnessed this accident and began repeatedly screaming, "You pushed her!" and that he had then accidentally suffocated her while attempting to stifle her screaming, which had preoccupied his attention as opposed to ensuring Wells did not drown. By the time his state of panic had waned, it had been too late to save the lives of either of the children and that his first coherent memory had been of sitting on his vomit-stained landing close to Chapman's body.

When questioned about his failure to call emergency services and subsequent, extensive efforts to destroy evidence and divert suspicion from himself, Huntley insisted he had first become preoccupied with whether the police and public would believe the girls' deaths had been accidental, and he had decided to conceal all evidence of the deaths as opposed to either notifying police or paramedics. Weeping, Huntley admitted responsibility for both deaths, but repeated his insistence that both deaths had been accidental. He tearfully claimed he had not attempted to feign insanity upon his arrest, insisting the trauma of the children's deaths had temporarily erased his memory and being in the presence of police had caused his mind to temporarily seize.

On 3 December, Carr went into the witness box to testify in her own defence. Responding to questioning from her defence counsel, Michael Hubbard QC, Carr briefly discussed her initial acquaintance with Huntley, their subsequent relationship and plans to start a family once they both obtained financial stability before Hubbard directed his questioning toward her return to Soham on 6 August and her discovering Huntley had recently washed their bedding and had evidently cleaned sections of the house. To these questions, Carr explained that her first impression had been that Huntley had "had a woman in the house", adding their bedding had been washed shortly before 4 August. Carr further testified to having noted a crack in the enamel of the bathtub which had not been there when she had travelled to Grimsby four days previously. When questioned about why she had then helped Huntley in extensively cleaning their home in the days after the children's murder, Carr claimed she had done so as she had always been "obsessive about tidiness."

Questioned about the efforts she had made to mislead both police and the media to divert suspicion from her partner, Carr emphasised she had lied to police, the media and "anyone who asks" only to protect Huntley, who had repeatedly assured her of his innocence of any wrongdoing and his fear of being "fitted up" by police for the girls' disappearance should they discover the 1998 rape allegation made against him. She further claimed to have referred to Wells and Chapman using the past tense merely because she had worked with the children in the past.

Carr said she had tried to persuade Huntley to contact police and "be open" about his claims to have invited the children into his home for Wells to staunch her nosebleed, but that he had refused to do so, as inviting children into their home had been a violation of the rules imposed by St Andrew's Primary School. She further explained her focus had therefore been to protect Huntley's job and reputation, adding that had she known of Huntley's guilt, she would never have attempted to provide him with a false alibi, stating to her counsel: "If, for a minute, I [had known] or believed he'd murdered either of those girls I would have been horrified."

Concluding his questioning, Hubbard cautioned the jury not to succumb to the temptation of judging Carr's morality, but to consider her state of mind prior to her arrest when considering whether the lies she had told warranted any criminal liability, stating she had "done no wrong" on the date of the children's murder, and had not returned to Soham until 6 August.

On 10 December, counsel for both prosecution and defence delivered their closing arguments to the jury. Latham delivered his closing argument on behalf of the prosecution by describing Huntley and Carr as "accomplished liars" before outlining the prosecution's case that both children had to die to satisfy Huntley's "selfish self-interest" before Huntley – with Carr's support – had embarked on twelve days of "cynical deception", with Carr revealing the truth to police only after being informed of the discovery of the children's bodies.

Referencing Huntley's likely motive for the murders and his claims at trial that both deaths had been accidental, Latham stated: "We invite you to reject the accounts of both deaths [being accidental] as desperate lies; the only way out for him. We suggest the whole business in the house was motivated by something sexual, but that whatever he initiated with one or the other or both girls plainly went wrong. Thereafter in this ruthless man's mind, both girls simply had to die. They had to die in his own selfish self-interest. Each was a witness, a potential complaint. And he was quite merciless."

In reference to Carr's conscious efforts to deceive the police and media alike, Latham stated: "She had the prospect of marriage, a baby, a nice home and a new start. She preferred to do what she could to make the best of the position she was in. That involved at all costs protecting Ian Huntley."

Following the conclusion of the prosecution's closing argument, Coward delivered his argument on behalf of the defence. He conceded his client was guilty of physical responsibility for the girls' deaths – as Huntley had admitted – and therefore deserved punishment, but argued that the prosecution had failed to provide definitive proof that Huntley had intended to murder the children or cause them bodily harm. Coward also contended the prosecution had failed to provide conclusive evidence to support their claim that Huntley's actual motive for the murders had been sexual. Coward concluded his closing argument by requesting the jury deliver a verdict of manslaughter in relation to both deaths.

Upon conclusion of both counsels' closing arguments, Mr Justice Moses announced the jury would begin their deliberations on 12 December.

=== Convictions ===
The jury deliberated for four days before reaching their verdicts against both defendants. On 17 December 2003, they returned a majority verdict of guilty on two counts of murder against Huntley. He was sentenced to life imprisonment, with a minimum term of imprisonment to be imposed by the Lord Chief Justice at a later date. Huntley's face showed no emotion as the verdict was announced; the mothers of both Wells and Chapman burst into tears.

Carr pleaded guilty to the charge of perverting the course of justice, and not guilty to the charge of assisting an offender. The jury accepted her insistence that she had lied to the police and media only in order to protect Huntley because, prior to their arrest, she had believed his claims of innocence. As such, she was found not guilty of assisting an offender. Carr was sentenced to serve three-and-a-half years in prison for perverting the course of justice.

Your tears have never been for them; only for yourself. In your attempts to escape responsibility, in your lies and manipulation ... you have increased the suffering of two families. There is no greater task for the criminal justice system than to protect the vulnerable. There are few worse crimes than your murder of these two young girls.

— Section of Mr Justice Alan Moses's sentencing of Ian Huntley. 17 December 2003

Minutes after the convictions, the parents of both girls granted an interview to the media. Discussing Huntley's mindset, Leslie Chapman opined: "I think he was a time bomb waiting to go off and both our girls were in the wrong place at the wrong time. I hope the next time I see him, it will be like we saw our daughters – and it will be in a coffin."

=== Sentencing ===
On 29 September 2005, High Court judge Mr Justice Moses announced Huntley must remain in prison until he had served a minimum of 40 years' imprisonment, a term which would not allow parole eligibility until 2042, by which time he would be 68 years old. In setting this minimum term of imprisonment, Mr Justice Moses stated: "The order I make offers little or no hope of the defendant's eventual release."

Huntley avoided eligibility for a whole life tariff as the passing of the Criminal Justice Act 2003 had been one day after his conviction, thus taking effect on 18 December 2003 and applying solely to murders committed on or after this date.

== Criminal profiles ==
=== Ian Huntley ===
Ian Huntley
- Born: Ian Kevin Huntley; 31 January 1974; Grimsby, Lincolnshire, England
- Died: 7 March 2026 (aged 52); Newcastle upon Tyne, England
- Cause of death: Bludgeoning (suspected murder)
- Other name: Ian Nixon
- Occupation: School caretaker
- Spouse: Claire Evans (m. 1995; ann. 1995)
- Status: Deceased
- Conviction: Murder (×2)
- Penalty: Life imprisonment (40-year minimum term)

Ian Kevin Huntley (31 January 1974 – 7 March 2026) was born in Grimsby, Lincolnshire, England; the first of two sons born to Kevin Huntley and his wife, Lynda (née Nixon). The Huntley family were working class and at the time of the birth of their first child, lodged with Lynda's parents in Grimsby. Following the birth of their second child, Wayne, in August 1975, the family moved into a rented property in Immingham, where Huntley attended school.

Huntley was a timid child, and something of a mother's boy. In his early years, he frequently threw tantrums in order to get his mother's attention; childhood friends later remarked how afraid he was of his stern father.

At both primary and secondary school, Huntley was an average pupil. He was regarded as a loner, an oddball and an attention seeker by his peers, and became a target for bullies. The bullying Huntley endured escalated when he entered Healing Comprehensive School aged 11, resulting in his academic performance waning. Huntley's parents enrolled their son in Immingham Comprehensive at age 13. He was again the target of physical and verbal bullying at this school, but did form a few friendships via a shared interest in video games. Huntley also enjoyed football, and was an avid supporter of Manchester United.

At the urging of his father, Huntley joined the Air Training Corps at age 13. His activities with this youth organisation fuelled an interest in aeroplanes he had held since childhood and he seriously considered a future career with the Royal Air Force. Huntley also developed a hobby of plane spotting. Via this hobby, he became familiar with the environs of RAF Lakenheath.

Despite having few friends, Huntley formed several relationships with girls while attending Immingham Comprehensive. Each of these girls was at least one year younger than himself; none of these relationships lasted longer than a few weeks.

In 1990, Huntley finished his schooling, obtaining five GCSE passes. He chose not to enrol in a college or sixth form, and instead committed himself to finding employment. Between 1990 and 1996, Huntley worked in a succession of menial jobs. These employment roles seldom lasted for a significant length of time, and he was frequently unemployed. He also viewed himself as something of a ladies' man, and was scrupulous about his personal appearance and personal hygiene.

==== Marriage ====
In June 1994, Huntley began dating 18-year-old Claire Evans, whom he met through his employment at a local Heinz factory. After two months of courtship, Huntley proposed to Evans. The couple married at Grimsby Register Office on 28 January 1995. The marriage was short-lived owing to Huntley's volatile temper, which surfaced within days of their marriage. Within a month, Huntley had begun to regularly sexually assault his wife, also subjecting her to indignities such as locking her in their house and cutting off her hair. On one occasion, he beat his wife so badly she suffered a miscarriage.

Following several weeks of mistreatment, Huntley's wife announced her intention to leave him. In an attempt to emotionally blackmail his wife into remaining with him, Huntley alternately feigned an illness and, later, began drooling before faking an epileptic seizure; neither ploy succeeded. Shortly after their separation, Huntley's wife formed a relationship with and later married Huntley's younger brother, Wayne.

==== Previous offences ====
In March 1996, Huntley was charged with burglary. In this offence, he and an accomplice allegedly broke into the house of a neighbour in Grimsby and stole electrical goods, jewellery and cash. The case reached court, but the prosecution offered no evidence, resulting in a judge ordering the offence to lie on file.

Between August 1995 and May 1996, Huntley established numerous sexual relationships with teenage girls, all of whom were under the legal age of consent. Three of them were aged 15, and one 13. (Note: Police concluded that about sixty underage girls had been abused by Huntley, twenty-eight of whom were interviewed in the investigation into the Soham murders.) One of these girls became pregnant at 15, and gave birth to a baby girl in 1998. (Note: Huntley refused to meet his daughter, who only learned of her parentage at age 14 after seeing a pixilated photograph of herself and her mother in connection with Huntley during a school crime project.) Although reported to police on three occasions, Huntley was not charged for any of these offences as each of the girls denied having engaged in sex with Huntley. Each refused to file criminal complaints or accept help from social services.

Rumours of Huntley's sexual interest in underage girls soon became community gossip, and he was regularly insulted by neighbours and colleagues. As a result, he began rebuffing any offers to socialise with colleagues for fear of being attacked while alone in their company.

In April 1998, Huntley was arrested on suspicion of raping an 18-year-old woman. He admitted engaging in sex with the claimant, but claimed the act had been consensual. He was not charged. A month later, Huntley was charged and remanded in custody at HM Prison Wolds for one week after another 18-year-old Grimsby woman claimed Huntley beat and raped her while she was walking home from a local nightclub. This complainant stated Huntley had threatened to kill her before assaulting her. Huntley admitted having sex with this woman, but insisted the act had been consensual. The criminal charge was dropped a week later after the Crown Prosecution Service, having examined CCTV footage from the nightclub and environs and finding evidence of the two socialising within the nightclub, determined insufficient evidence existed to secure a conviction for this offence. As a result of this complaint, further rumours regarding Huntley's sexual violence also became community gossip, resulting in Huntley being fired from his job and forcing him to move into his mother's home. He was also forbidden from initiating contact with his baby daughter or her mother.

In July 1998, police were notified that Huntley had sexually assaulted an 11-year-old girl in the town of Cleethorpes in September 1997, having threatened to kill the child if she informed her mother. He was never charged with this offence, but confessed to this attack in April 2007.

The final criminal allegation against Huntley prior to the Soham murders dates from July 1999. In this instance, a woman was raped, and Huntley – by this stage suspected by police of being a serial sex offender – was interviewed. Huntley supplied a DNA sample to assist in their enquiries, with Carr providing an alibi to support his claims of innocence. The victim of this assault later said Huntley had not been the perpetrator of her assault. This case differs from the others as the victim had not identified or named Huntley as being her assailant. (Note: Huntley had never been convicted of any of these criminal allegations; his burglary charge had remained on file. Howard Gilbert, the then headteacher of Soham Village College—having admitted the college's failure to check Huntley's references prior to offering him employment—later said that he would not have employed Huntley if he had been aware of the burglary charge, as one of Huntley's key responsibilities was to ensure security in the school grounds.)

By 2001, Huntley's proven and alleged criminal activities had been reported to Humberside Police on ten occasions and to the social services on five occasions.

==== Motive ====
Huntley's motive for killing the children is unknown; minutes prior to encountering Wells and Chapman, he is known to have had an argument with Carr, ending in his slamming the phone down. Huntley had allegedly suspected Carr of conducting affairs throughout their relationship, leading his mother and some police officers to suspect that he had killed the two girls in a fit of jealous rage. However, prior to his trial, a criminal profile had resulted in him being described by an eminent criminal psychologist as a "latent, predatory paedophile" who had lured Wells and Chapman into his home in a moment of opportunism.

The prosecution contended at Huntley's trial that a likely sexual motive existed for the murders. Testimony from Carr had indicated her suspicions that sexual activity had occurred in their home in her absence as, although Huntley had insisted throughout their relationship that Carr perform all domestic chores, she noticed that he had washed the quilts, pillow cases and sheets of their bed in her absence. Pathological evidence retrieved from the bodies suggested that at least one of the girls had been subjected to a sexual assault either before or after her murder. However, this was not disclosed to the jury at Huntley's trial, where Nathaniel Cary, a Home Office pathologist, explained the bodies were too decomposed and fire-damaged to determine an exact cause of death or whether either girl had been subjected to a sexual assault.

Prosecutors at Huntley's trial contended he had lured the children into his house with a likely sexual motivation, but investigators found no evidence of premeditation in relation to the murders. At the September 2005 hearing in which the minimum term Huntley should serve before any parole eligibility was decided, Mr Justice Moses stated: "There is a likelihood of [a] sexual motivation, but there was no evidence of sexual activity, and it remains no more than a likelihood."

Prior to murdering Wells and Chapman, Huntley had established an extensive record of consensual and non-consensual sexual activity with females – many of whom had been under the age of consent. He would typically use guile or force to achieve his desires. Between 1992 and 2002, he had committed many acts of physical and sexual violence against women and children for which he had been unpunished. The youngest girl Huntley is known to have raped was 12 years old, with another girl he had attempted to rape being 11.

Following his arrest, several former girlfriends and sexual partners stated that Huntley presented himself as a charming and considerate man in the early stages of a relationship, but would become domineering and violent upon having established control. Huntley severely restricted and supervised any contact his partner held with her family or social acquaintances. He would emotionally blackmail his partner if he detected any signs of her developing resistance to his control or indicating a desire to leave him.

According to one columnist, the fact that Huntley had remained unpunished for these often blatant and continuous acts had increased his confidence and reinforced his domineering, misogynistic mindset and fuelled his recidivism. Psychologists determined Huntley had mentally blocked any attempts to accept the reality or enormity of his actions pertaining to his repeated violence against females in order that he might cope with the consequences of his actions.

=== Maxine Carr ===
Maxine Carr
- 20 August 2002 custody photograph of Carr
- Born: Maxine Ann Capp; 16 February 1977 (age 49); Grimsby, Lincolnshire, England
- Occupation: Teaching assistant
- Status: Released
- Conviction: Perverting the course of justice
- Penalty: 42 months' imprisonment

Maxine Carr was born Maxine Ann Capp in Grimsby, Lincolnshire, on 16 February 1977. She is the second of two daughters born to Alfred Capp and his wife, Shirley, née Suddaby.

The marriage between Capp's parents was marred by frequent arguments. Following a heated argument in mid-1979, Shirley ordered her husband to leave the household. Shortly thereafter, she and her daughters moved to the village of Keelby. Alfred seldom maintained contact with his wife and children, and refused to provide any financial support for his daughters. Capp and her older sister were largely raised by their mother and grandparents. The family regularly experienced financial difficulties, but Shirley would later state she "spoiled" her daughters to the best of her financial ability.

As a child and adolescent, Capp was viewed by her peers as a timid outcast, with few friends. She performed poorly academically, but always aspired to become a teacher.

By the time Capp entered adolescence, she was slightly overweight, leading her to become insecure about her appearance. She had shunned the company of boys as a child, but as a teenager craved – but seldom received – the attention of boys her age, occasionally leading to bouts of binge eating in addition to her developing the habit of self-harming.

By the age of 15, Capp weighed more than 10 stone (64 kg; 140 lb), resulting in her being bullied by her classmates. In an effort to lose weight, she developed a habit of forcing herself to vomit after eating. This led to her developing anorexia at 16, with her weight at one stage dropping to 6 stone (38 kg; 84 lb), and her mother forcing her to eat in order for her to regain weight.

In 1993, Capp finished her schooling, having obtained no qualifications. She briefly worked alongside her mother in a fish processing plant as she considered which career path she should choose before enrolling at the Grimsby Institute of Further & Higher Education, having chosen to study general care. Capp obtained her diploma in 1996. The same year, she and her mother moved from Keelby back to Grimsby. Shortly thereafter, she briefly worked as a junior care assistant at a care home for the elderly in Grimsby, then returned to work alongside her mother as a labourer at Bluecrest fish processing plant.

Several of Capp's colleagues later remarked how they found her to be a distant and immature figure with few friends or hobbies. To one colleague, Capp would talk incessantly about her dreams of leaving this employment and embarking on a teaching career.

By the time Capp had obtained employment at Bluecrest, she had garnered sufficient courage to begin dating men, but none of these relationships lasted more than a few months. Shy and reserved and prone to wear clothing which concealed her figure when sober, Capp became markedly flirtatious when having consumed alcohol, and is known to have occasionally engaged in exhibitionism in addition to frequently engaging in one-night stands with people she encountered in pubs and clubs. (Note: Several of Carr's former partners would later inform reporters they found her to be emotionally detached, sexually promiscuous and also jealous by nature. Several of her early relationships had ended for these reasons.)

While Capp resided with her mother in Grimsby, she unofficially adopted the surname Benson. She later legally changed her surname to Carr in an apparent effort to distance herself from her father.

==== Relationship ====
In February 1999, Huntley met 22-year-old Maxine Carr in a Grimsby nightclub. On this occasion, Carr had been drinking with a former boyfriend named Paul Selby when Huntley – a casual acquaintance of Selby – approached the two and initiated a conversation. According to Carr, she was "instantly attracted" to Huntley's self-confident and pleasant persona, and agreed to begin dating him that same evening. Within four weeks of their acquaintance, she had moved into Huntley's Barton-upon-Humber flat, and the couple informed relatives of their eagerness to start a family. Shortly thereafter, the couple moved to a ground-floor flat in Scunthorpe, where Huntley formally proposed to Carr in June 1999.

Although they were a besotted couple in public, Huntley was very possessive of Carr, and is known to have emotionally abused and physically assaulted her frequently, often culminating in Carr returning to live with her mother before Huntley persuaded her to return to live with him. Both Huntley and Carr are known to have conducted affairs throughout their relationship. Noting how Carr often became flirtatious when she consumed alcohol, Huntley sought to minimise any opportunity for her to drink or otherwise socialise outside his presence for fear of her cheating on him with other males.

When they met, Huntley temporarily worked for an insurance company in Market Rasen. He soon found new employment at a finance company in Binbrook while Carr maintained her employment packing fish at a local fish processing factory. The couple relocated to East Anglia in early 2001. Shortly thereafter, Huntley obtained employment as a barman in a local pub.

By 2001, Huntley had re-established contact with his father, (Note: Huntley's parents had separated in 1993. Following their separation, Huntley had distanced himself from his father for several years.) who worked as a school caretaker in Littleport, near Ely. He regularly travelled to the East Cambridgeshire district of East Anglia on his days off to help his father, and soon developed aspirations to become a school caretaker himself. Via his father, Huntley learned of a school caretaker vacancy in nearby Soham Village College in mid-2001. He applied for this position using the alias Ian Nixon and secured employment as a senior caretaker in September 2001, supervising the work of four other employees. (Note: Huntley's mother's maiden name had been Nixon. Following the separation of his parents in 1993, Huntley chose to use his mother's surname. He would resume using his father's surname only following the 2002 reconciliation of his parents.)

No background check was conducted before or after this job interview, and although Huntley lacked extensive experience in this form of employment, his application for this position was successful. His employers helped him to get the tenancy of 5 College Close, and he and Carr moved to Soham in late September. Huntley began work at Soham Village College on 26 November. He worked as a senior caretaker there until his arrest.

In February 2002, Huntley found Carr a part-time job at St Andrew's Primary School, although she lied about her academic qualifications when applying for this position. This employment was initially voluntary work, but Carr later became a teaching assistant in the school's Year 5 class. Wells and Chapman became two of the pupils she taught, and both girls were fond of her.

In July 2002, Carr applied for a vacant full-time teaching assistant position at St Andrew's Primary School. She found out on 23 July that her application had been unsuccessful. One of the children to express dismay at this decision was Wells, who having broken down in tears upon learning Carr's application for the teaching position had been unsuccessful, presented her with a hand-drawn card, depicting a smiling face, in which she stated: "I'll miss you a lot. Thank you! C ya around school! Miss ya! Luv Holly."

By mid-2002, the physical relationship between Huntley and Carr had begun to deteriorate. By Huntley's own later admission, he had become sexually frustrated, and had unsuccessfully attempted to persuade a married colleague to date him on the weekend Carr visited her mother in Grimsby.

At 9:53 am on 4 August, Huntley attempted to phone Carr, but she did not answer her mobile phone. Carr replied to his missed call at 6:23 pm. This four-minute phone call escalated into a heated argument, culminating in Huntley angrily terminating the phone call after she informed him of her intentions to socialise in Grimsby that evening. Four minutes later, Carr sent Huntley a text message which read: "Don't make me feel bad because I'm with my family." Huntley did not reply to this message.

== Aftermath ==
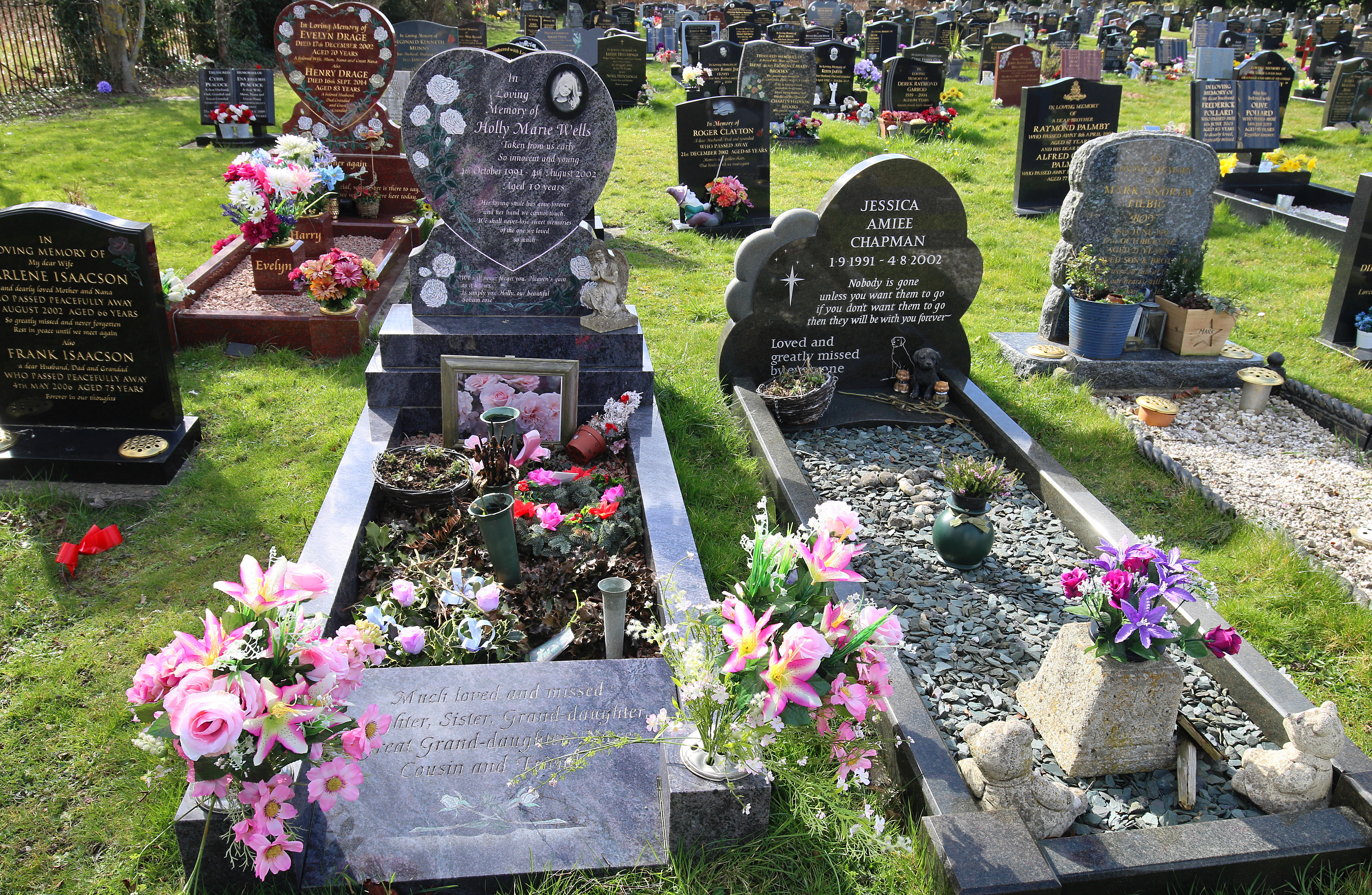
The adjacent graves of Holly Wells and Jessica Chapman

An orange-petalled rose, dedicated to the memory of Wells and Chapman, was unveiled by representatives of Soham Town Council at the 2003 Chelsea Flower Show. The inspiration for dedicating a flower to the children's memory came from a poem read aloud at the memorial service at Ely Cathedral on 30 August 2002 by the father of Wells, titled Soham's Rose.

On 3 April 2004, the three-bedroom house in College Close in which the murders occurred was demolished and the site levelled, with all rubble from the property being discarded at various undisclosed locations. The site where 5 College Close once stood is now a vacant patch of grass.

=== Huntley ===
Within days of Huntley's sentencing, he reflected to the media on the prospect of spending the remainder of his life behind bars and of his fears for his security, exclaiming: "I'm going to rot inside this place. I'll rot in here, I know it. I'll spend the rest of my life in here [...] I'm going to be inside forever, and it'll be torture."

In 2004, Huntley's parents revealed that he had confessed to murdering Jessica Chapman during a prison visit, but refused to divulge any information pertaining to Wells's death.

On 5 September 2006, Huntley attempted to kill himself by taking an overdose of antidepressants he had accumulated in his prison cell. This resulted in his hospitalisation and a thorough search of his cell, in which a cassette tape was recovered. This cassette tape contains a markedly different account of the murders of Wells and Chapman than that to which Huntley had testified at his trial.

In what Huntley had believed would be his posthumous confession, he claimed to have confessed to having murdered both girls to Carr prior to their arrest and his plans to confess to authorities, to which, Huntley alleged, Carr had slapped his face and informed him to "pull [himself] together" as she did not wish to lose the teaching position she had yearned for all her life. Huntley further alleged Carr had encouraged him to burn both bodies in an attempt to destroy all forensic evidence linking him to the crime. It is believed Huntley had agreed to make this recording for a fellow prisoner, who had hoped to later sell the confession to the media after his release, in return for being given the antidepressants he had used to attempt suicide.

In April 2007, Huntley confessed to having sexually assaulted an 11-year-old girl he had dragged into an orchard in 1997. This admission – in which Huntley also confessed to having a sexual interest in children while insisting the murders of Wells and Chapman had not been sexually motivated – was welcomed by the victim of this sexual assault. Following Huntley's admission of guilt, this victim issued a press statement in which she confessed to feeling "a massive sense of relief", but concluded this statement with the sentence: "Yet, I still feel upset that Huntley was left at large, resulting in the deaths of two innocent children."

In the years following his conviction and incarceration, Huntley was repeatedly attacked by other inmates. On 14 September 2005, while an inmate at HM Prison Wakefield, he was scalded with boiling water by convicted spree killer Mark Hobson. The injuries Huntley received in this attack resulted in him being unable to attend the hearing at which his minimum term of imprisonment was decided. Following this attack, Huntley alleged that prison authorities had failed in their duty of care towards him, and launched a claim for £15,000 in compensation. He was reportedly awarded £2,500 in legal aid to pursue this claim.

Huntley was transferred from Wakefield prison to HMP Frankland on 23 January 2008. Two years later, on 21 March 2010, he received non life-threatening injuries to his neck after his throat was slashed by convicted armed robber Damien Fowkes. The injuries Huntley received in this attack required hospital treatment. Huntley again applied for compensation for the injuries he received in this attack, seeking £20,000 in damages.

==== Death ====
On 26 February 2026, Huntley received serious head and facial injuries in an assault with an improvised weapon at the hands of another inmate in HMP Frankland's prison workshop. Tensions had risen against Huntley due to his habit of wearing a Manchester United shirt resembling those worn by Chapman and Wells at the time of their murder, which reportedly caused friction between Huntley and other inmates. Huntley was removed from life support on 6 March and died the following morning at the age of 52. The sole individual to visit Huntley in hospital prior to his death was his mother.

Convicted murderer and rapist Anthony Russell was charged with Huntley's murder on 10 March. The Prisons and Probation Ombudsman has since announced a formal investigation into Huntley's death. The inquest into his death opened on 14 April and heard that Huntley had been "struck over the head multiple times by another prisoner with an object described as a metal bar", with the forensic pathologist who conducted Huntley's post-mortem concluding his death was the result of a "blunt head injury". The inquest was suspended pending the ongoing criminal proceedings; Russell was formally charged with Huntley's murder on 26 April.

=== Carr ===
Carr was released on probation from HM Prison Foston Hall on 14 May 2004 after serving a total of 21 months' imprisonment (including the 16 months she had been detained while on remand). She was given a secret identity to protect her from threats of attack from vengeful members of the public, and a new home in an undisclosed location. At the time, Carr was one of four former prisoners in the UK to be given a new identity upon release. Carr won an injunction on 24 February 2005, granting her lifelong anonymity on the grounds that her life would otherwise be in danger. The costs of imposing this order have been reported by differing tabloid newspapers as being between £1 million and £50 million.

At least a dozen women have been falsely identified as being Carr and either persecuted or physically attacked owing to false stories speculating as to her whereabouts and new identity which have been printed in tabloid publications.

Shortly after her release from prison, Carr and her family contacted a Tyneside-based publishing company with a view toward publishing her autobiography. Mirage Publishing initially agreed to publish Carr's autobiography, but withdrew their offer after a feature on BBC Radio Newcastle prompted scores of complaints from the public.

== Inquiry ==
Immediately after Huntley's conviction, previous criminal allegations against him were made public. These disclosures revealed that not only had police failed to pursue numerous previous criminal complaints of sexual offences against underage girls and young women by Huntley, but also he had then secured a job in Soham allowing him access to children.

Upon learning of these public disclosures, Home Secretary David Blunkett announced a public inquiry into the intelligence-based record keeping and vetting system which had allowed Huntley to obtain employment as a school caretaker despite these previous criminal complaints, which had been reported to police and social services. Chaired by Sir Michael Bichard, the Bichard inquiry opened on 13 January 2004. The results of this inquiry were published that June.

The report's introduction says:

This Inquiry was set up by the Home Secretary to

Urgently enquire into child protection procedures in Humberside Police and Cambridgeshire Constabulary in the light of the recent trial and conviction of Ian Huntley for the murder of Jessica Chapman and Holly Wells.

In particular to assess the effectiveness of the relevant intelligence-based record keeping, the vetting practices in those forces since 1995 and information sharing with other agencies, and to report to the Home Secretary on matters of local and national relevance and make recommendations as appropriate.

One of the issues scrutinised by the Bichard report surfaced almost immediately when Humberside Police stated their belief that it was unlawful under the Data Protection Act to hold data regarding criminal allegations which had not led to a conviction; this claim was criticised by other police forces who thought this too strict an interpretation of the Act. The inquiry scrutinised the investigation by Cambridgeshire Police into the children's disappearance and murder, as almost two weeks had elapsed following the disappearance of Wells and Chapman before Cambridgeshire Police became aware of Huntley's previous criminal background, despite his claims of being the last person to see the children alive. Further criticism was directed at the force for their initial failure to scrutinise Carr's claims to have been in Soham on the date of the children's disappearance.

The inquiry also severely criticised Humberside Police for deleting information relating to the previous criminal allegations against Huntley, and also criticised Cambridgeshire Police for not following standard vetting guidelines. Both the Humberside and Cambridgeshire Police were heavily criticised for their failings in maintaining criminal intelligence records on Huntley.

Bichard later ordered the suspension of the Chief of Humberside Police, David Westwood, for ordering the destruction of records pertaining to alleged child molesters which had not resulted in a conviction. This suspension was later overturned. Westwood retired in March 2005. The Chief Constable of Cambridgeshire Constabulary, Tom Lloyd, was also subjected to severe criticism as his force had failed to contact Humberside Police during the investigation into Huntley's criminal background prior to his securing employment at Soham Village College.

An added complication in these criminal vetting procedures was the fact that Huntley had applied for the caretaker's job under the name of Ian Nixon, although he divulged on the application form for this position that he was previously known as Ian Huntley. It is believed that Cambridgeshire Police failed to perform a background check under the name Huntley. Had they done so, they would have discovered an outstanding burglary charge on file relating to his November 1995 arrest for this crime.

=== Recommendations ===
The Bichard inquiry recommended a mandatory registration scheme for people working with children and vulnerable adults such as the elderly and mentally handicapped. This recommendation later led to the foundation of the Independent Safeguarding Authority. The findings also suggested a national system should be implemented for police forces to share intelligence information, and that all police forces should follow a clear code of practice on record-keeping. These findings ultimately led to the tightening of various procedures within the Criminal Records Bureau system, including compulsory checks into potential criminal backgrounds of people who apply to work with children.

== Media ==
=== Literature ===
- Gerrard, Nicci (2004). Soham: A Story of Our Times. Short Books. ISBN 978-1-904-09592-7.
- Yates, Nathan (2005). Beyond Evil: Inside the Twisted Mind of Ian Huntley. John Blake Publishing. ISBN 1844541428.

=== Television ===
- The Channel 4 documentary Being Maxine Carr focuses on the lasting public outrage at Carr's efforts to pervert the course of justice following the Soham murders, and how numerous women across the UK have been falsely accused of being Carr. This documentary was first broadcast on 14 December 2007.
- Soham: 10 Years On. Produced and directed by Emma McKinney, this 60-minute documentary was first broadcast on 30 July 2012.
- The 90-minute documentary Soham Revisited: 15 Years On was first broadcast on 25 April 2017. Narrated by Alison Steadman, this documentary features interviews with previous lovers of Huntley.
- The Investigation Discovery channel broadcast a 60-minute documentary focusing on the Soham murders as part of their Faking It: Tears of a Crime true crime documentary series. This documentary primarily focuses on the efforts made by Huntley and Carr to deceive police and public alike, and was first broadcast on 18 August 2017.
- Channel 5 also commissioned a documentary focusing on the Soham murders. This documentary, titled 5 Mistakes That Caught a Killer, was first broadcast on 23 May 2019.
- A further two part, 60-minute documentary, commissioned by Channel 5, Soham: The Murder of Holly & Jessica, was first broadcast on 9 & 10 March 2022.
- Channel 5 first broadcast the three-episode drama Maxine on 10 October 2022. The series primarily focuses on Carr's role in providing a false alibi for Huntley.

=== Podcast ===
- "Holly Wells & Jessica Chapman" (2016). Case 08 of Casefile True Crime Podcast series.
- "Holly and Jessica: The Soham Murders" (2020). Bonus Episode of RedHanded true crime podcast series.

== See also ==
- Child abduction
- Child sexual abuse
- List of kidnappings
- List of solved missing person cases (post-2000)

== Cited works and further reading ==
- Bruce, Alison (2012). Cambridgeshire Murders. History Press. ISBN 978-0-752-48413-6.
- Collins, Danny (2010). Crimes That Shocked The World. John Blake Publishing Ltd. ISBN 978-1-844-54974-0.
- Duffy, Wendy (2003). Children and Bereavement. Church House Publishing. ISBN 0-715-14998-9.
- Foster, Steven (2009). Human Rights and Civil Liberties. Longman Publishing. ISBN 978-1-408-25931-3.
- Gerrard, Nicci (2004). Soham: A Story of Our Times. Short Books. ISBN 978-1-904-09592-7.
- Grant, Thomas (2019). Court Number One: The Old Bailey Trials that Defined Modern Britain. John Murray Publishing. ISBN 978-1-473-65161-6.
- McKenzie, Dennis (2009). Being the Soham Psychic. Headline Publishing Group. ISBN 978-0-755-31982-4.
- Wells, Kevin (2005). Goodbye, Dearest Holly. Psychology News Press Ltd. ISBN 978-0-907633-02-0.
- Yates, Nathan (2005). Beyond Evil: Inside the Twisted Mind of Ian Huntley. John Blake Publishing. ISBN 978-1844-54142-3.
