= 2013 in British television =

This is a list of events that took place in 2013 related to British television.

== Events ==
=== January ===
| Date | Event |
|---|---|
| 2 | ITV signs a twelve-month product placement deal with DFS that will see the furniture retailer's sofas used as part of the set for This Morning. |
| 4 | The CBeebies and CBBC blocks on BBC Two air for the last time. The children's programming would in the future air exclusively on their dedicated channels. |
| 4 | The Dumping Ground makes its debut on CBBC for the first time. |
| 5–6 | CITV celebrates its 30th anniversary with an "Old Skool" marathon of archive programming on the weekend. |
| 5 | In a poll conducted for the film channel Sky Movies 007 HD, a scene from Goldfinger in which James Bond is strapped to a table while a laser beam begins to cut it in half is voted as the best Bond movie moment. |
| 5 | Launch of ITV's celebrity diving contest, Splash!, in which Olympic bronze medalist Tom Daley teaches contestants to dive. The first episode is seen by 5.6 million viewers, but receives a mixed reception from critics. |
| 6 | BBC One airs the last programme in its astronomy series The Sky at Night to be presented by Sir Patrick Moore, recorded shortly before his death on 9 December 2012. He launched the series in 1957. |
| 6 | ITV period drama Mr Selfridge, set in a department store which covers the historical events of the 20th century from 1908 to 1929 featuring the retail magnate Harry Gordon Selfridge portrayed by Jeremy Piven, makes its debut. |
| 7 | BBC sports presenter Gabby Logan is appointed Chancellor of Leeds Trinity University. |
| 7 | Anne Wood, creator of Teletubbies and Brum, criticises the BBC's decision to remove children's programming from its mainstream channels, accusing them of "ghettoising" children's television. |
| 9 | BBC Four confirms that its reruns of Top of the Pops will continue with episodes from 1978, but that editions featuring Jimmy Savile will not be aired. |
| 13 | Ahead of the rebranding, ITV News aired its final news bulletin using the black and yellow set which was broadcast at 10pm. |
| 14 | ITV1 rebrands back to its original name, ITV, after 12 years, along with the introduction of a new logo on ITV plc-owned channels and online services. Also on the same day, ITV News revealed its new-look newsroom studio featuring the blue and teal green set replacing the black and yellow version. |
| 18 | After nearly four years, Countdown is filmed at the Granada Studios in Manchester for the last time. Subsequent series are now filmed at dock10, MediaCityUK in Salford thus marking the second time that the show has relocated in its 30-year history. |
| 20 | The BBC issues an immediate apology after its digital channel CBeebies airs an episode of Tweenies from 2001 in which one of the main characters named Max dresses as Jimmy Savile to present a chart show. |
| 22 | Broadcaster Stuart Hall is charged with one count of rape and 14 of indecent assault following a police investigation into historic allegations. |
| 23 | Coronation Street, Downton Abbey, This Morning, Strictly Come Dancing and Miranda Hart are among the big winners at the 18th National Television Awards. Joanna Lumley takes home a lifetime achievement accolade. |
| 25 | Singer Rylan Clark wins the eleventh series of Celebrity Big Brother. |
| 30 | Former Channel 5 Director of Programmes Jeff Ford has been hired by Irish commercial broadcaster TV3 to become their new Director of Content, a position he will take up in February. |

=== February ===
| Date | Event |
|---|---|
| 2 | Former Olympic Skier Eddie "The Eagle" Edwards wins the first series of Splash!. |
| 4 | More4 launches in high-definition for the first time. |
| 5 | Cable television provider Virgin Media announced it is to be acquired by Liberty Global for US$23.3 billion (£15 billion). |
| 8 | The BBC Trust approves a twelve-month trial to make some BBC TV content available online through BBC iPlayer ahead of its scheduled television debut. |
| 9 | BBC Three celebrates its 10th anniversary. |
| 13 | ITV's This Morning apologises after "accidentally" showing a photograph of Catherine Middleton in a bikini. The image was used while discussing a recent controversy involving pictures of the Duchess, but should have been blurred out. |
| 14 | Former head of BBC News Helen Boaden is appointed Director of BBC Radio by incoming BBC Director-General Tony Hall. She will take up the position from April. |
| 15 | ITV drops the actor Michael Le Vell from Coronation Street pending the outcome of legal proceedings after police charge him with 19 child sex offences allegedly committed between 2001 and 2010. |
| 16 | Sir Jonathan Ive, Senior Vice-president of Industrial Design for Apple Inc., is presented with Blue Peter's highest accolade, a gold Blue Peter badge in a special edition of the show about gadgets. |
| 18 | BBC journalists stage a one-day strike over compulsory redundancies. |
| 23 | Ant & Dec's Saturday Night Takeaway returns to ITV after a four-year hiatus. |
| 25 | Telecommunications giant BT, which bought the rights to some Premier League matches in 2012, expands its investment in sports broadcasting with the purchase of ESPN's channels in Britain and Ireland. |

=== March ===
| Date | Event |
|---|---|
| 4 | BBC One airs the 1000th edition of A Question of Sport. |
| 10 | Prince Charles guest edits an edition of Countryfile to celebrate the programme's 25th anniversary. |
| 10 | Olympic gymnast Beth Tweddle and dance partner Daniel Whiston win the eighth series of Dancing on Ice. |
| 14 | A full-size replica of the House of Commons, used in place of the real chamber in several films and television series, is among film sets for sale on the internet auction site eBay. It is sold for £123,000, but auctioned again at an auction house in June after the buyer failed to complete the purchase. |
| 16 | The 2013 Comic Relief telethon raises a record £75 million for charity. |
| 17 | The final BBC News bulletins are aired from BBC Television Centre before news operations switch to the Broadcasting House in Central London, effective from 18 March. |
| 19 | Coronation Street actor William Roache apologises after appearing to suggest victims of paedophiles were being punished for past sins in an interview for New Zealand's One News. |
| 19 | It is reported that Channel 4 will screen a documentary The Murder Trial showing footage of the trial of Nat Fraser, who in 2012 was convicted of the murder of his estranged wife, Arlene. |
| 23 | Granada Reports is broadcast from the Granada Studios at Quay Street for the last time. |
| 24 | ITV Granada broadcasts from the dock10 studios for the first time. |
| 26 | BBC Two launches in high definition for the first time, two and a half years after BBC One did. |
| 26 | Research published by the Archives of Disease in Childhood suggests that five-year-olds who watch more than three hours of television a day are more likely to develop antisocial behaviour than those who do not. |
| 29 | BBC journalists stage a twelve-hour strike, disrupting television and radio news programmes. |
| 30 | The BBC confirms that David Tennant and Billie Piper will appear in the Doctor Who 50th anniversary special. |
| 30 | Sir Tony Robinson's new Channel 4 history series Walking Through History started. |
| 31 | The BBC Television Centre is closed and all BBC services move to the Broadcasting House. |

=== April ===
| Date | Event |
|---|---|
| 1 | Responsibility for the funding of S4C begins to transfer to the BBC. |
| 1 | The cox of the University of Oxford rowing team apologises for repeated use of the F-word during the previous day's University Boat Race which aired live on television. |
| 4 | Countdown co-presenter Rachel Riley will join the presenting team of Channel 5's The Gadget Show when the series returns in the summer, it is announced. |
| 7 | Catchphrase returns to ITV after an 11-year hiatus. Stephen Mulhern is chosen as the new host which follows the footsteps of previous hosts ranging from Roy Walker, Nick Weir and Mark Curry since its debut in 1986. |
| 9 | The US TV miniseries The Bible, a ten-part dramatisation of some of the Bible's most famous stories, will be aired by Channel 5 later in the year, it is announced. |
| 14 | Endeavour becomes a full series after a successful pilot run last year. |
| 15 | The BBC says that an edition of Panorama filmed secretly on a university study trip to North Korea will be broadcast, despite claims by the London School of Economics that students may have been put in danger. |
| 16 | James Harding, former editor of The Times, is named as the new BBC Director of News. He replaces Helen Boaden, who was moved from the job to become Director of Radio. |
| 17 | BBC One airs the funeral of former Prime Minister Margaret Thatcher, who died on 8 April. The three-hour special is watched by an average 3.2 million viewers, peaking at 4.4 million. |
| 17 | A planned showing of the film Four Lions is cancelled by Film4 in the wake of the Boston Marathon bombing in which three people died. |
| 19 | Channel 5 pulls two programmes narrated by Rolf Harris from its schedule after reports the presenter was interviewed by police over allegations of sexual offences. |
| 23 | Current Director of BBC One, Danny Cohen is appointed Director of BBC Television, taking up the position from 7 May. |
| 25 | The BBC is to limit the redundancy packages for its managers to £150,000 following criticism about the amount of severance paid to its executives. |
| 26 | Ray Winstone guest hosts Have I Got News for You, the edition prompting over 100 complaints to the BBC and Ofcom in the following days because of the programme's perceived anti-Scottish stance during a section discussing Scottish independence. |
| 29 | The University of Manchester wins the 2012–13 series of University Challenge, beating University College London 190–140. |

=== May ===
| Date | Event |
|---|---|
| 1 | Forthcoming scenes from Coronation Street featuring William Roache will be dropped after he is arrested over historic allegations of rape. ITV says he will not appear again in the soap while investigations are ongoing. |
| 2 | Broadcaster Stuart Hall pleads guilty to 14 charges of sexual assault. |
| 2 | Natalie Coleman wins the 2013 series of MasterChef. |
| 6 | A man who died along with his daughter in a speedboat crash off the north Cornish coast on 5 May is named as senior BSkyB executive Nick Milligan. |
| 8 | BBC Two Controller Janice Hadlow takes temporary control of BBC Four following the departure of Richard Klein to become head of ITV factual programming. |
| 9 | BT announces it will offer their BT Sport channels to its broadband customers for free in a bid to challenge Sky's dominance of the pay-per-view market. |
| 16 | The BBC apologises for a Newsnight report about Help for Heroes that falsely suggested the charity was responsible for shortcomings in the care of wounded soldiers. |
| 17 | Ian Allen, the creator of children's television series Button Moon wins a claim for damages against a businessman he says copied his designs for tee shirts and mugs. |
| 18 | Denmark's Emmelie de Forest wins the 2013 Eurovision Song Contest with "Only Teardrops". |
| 20 | The BBC documentary series Panorama airs unseen footage from the 1989 Hillsborough disaster that casts doubt on medical evidence given at the inquest. |
| 21 | ITV celebrity ice skating competition Dancing on Ice will end in 2014 after 1 further "all-stars" series, after Torvill & Christopher Dean would retire after 30 years of their Bolero performance at the 1984 Winter Olympics. |
| 23 | BBC political editor Nick Robinson apologises after he quoted a source describing the perpetrators of the previous day's Woolwich attack as "of Muslim appearance". The BBC received 43 complaints after Robinson used the term during the BBC News at Six. |
| 24 | The BBC scraps its £98m Digital Media Initiative – a project launched in 2008 to change the way the corporation's staff utilised video and audio material. Director-General Tony Hall says the scheme has "wasted a huge amount of licence fee payers' money", and that an investigation will be held to determine what lessons can be learned from the venture. |
| 24 | The BBC apologises after a floor plan for the 23 May edition of Question Time from Belfast described the Northern Ireland Education Minister John O'Dowd as being from Sinn Féin/IRA. The phrase is a pejorative term used by members of the unionist community, but Sinn Féin maintains it and the IRA are separate organisations. |
| 27 | Former Crimewatch presenter Nick Ross issues a statement in defence of criticism he received for comments he makes about rape in his forthcoming book, Crime. |
| 30 | ITV announce that Beverley Callard is to reprise her role as Coronation Street's Liz McDonald, and will be seen on screen again from October. |

=== June ===
| Date | Event |
|---|---|
| 1 | The BBC announces that Doctor Who actor Matt Smith will quit as the Eleventh Doctor at the end of 2013. |
| 1 | BBC One airs highlights of The Sound of Change Live, a benefit concert held in aid of fashion brand Gucci's Chime for Change campaign at Twickenham Stadium in London. |
| 6 | In an interview for Richard Herring's Leicester Square Theatre podcast, actor and comedian Stephen Fry, who has bipolar disorder speaks candidly about an attempted suicide bid while he was filming abroad in 2012. |
| 6 | Coronation Street actor Bill Roache is charged with five historical accounts of indecent assault against four girls during the 1960s. |
| 7 | Queen Elizabeth II opens the BBC's rebuilt Broadcasting House, creating a memorable television moment when she appears behind the BBC News channel's on air newsreaders. |
| 8 | The series seven finale of Britain's Got Talent is disrupted when a woman runs on stage and throws eggs at the judges. She is later revealed to be a member of one of the performing act's backing group. The series is won by shadow dancing group Attraction. |
| 9 | Channel 4 airs an entire commercial break in French to celebrate the launch of its French zombie drama The Returned. |
| 13 | Comedian Rory Bremner presents Rory Goes to Holyrood, a one-off comedy programme for BBC Scotland that takes a satirical look at Scottish politics and the independence debate. The show was conceived as a way of injecting some comedy into a subject that has suffered from an absence of humour. |
| 14 | The Broadcasters' Audience Research Board announces that catch-up programmes viewed online or through smart devices will be included in official viewing figures for the first time from Autumn 2013. |
| 17 | BBC broadcaster Stuart Hall is sentenced to 15 months in jail for sexually abusing under age girls, as the BBC issues an "unreserved apology" to his victims. |
| 17 | Ofcom launches an investigation into the broadcasting of footage from the Woolwich attack after receiving about 700 complaints. |
| 17 | Broadcaster Jo Whiley criticises reality shows such as The Voice and Britain's Got Talent, saying the contestants who appear on them are unaware of what they are letting themselves in for. |
| 18 | ITV announces that Birds of a Feather will return to British television in January 2014 following a fifteen-year break after the broadcaster signed up the original BBC cast. |
| 19 | Ofcom is to launch an investigation into BSkyB over the supply of its sports channels to rival broadcasters. |
| 22 | Andrea Begley wins the second series of The Voice. |
| 25 | It is reported that ITV are considering cancelling Prize Island, a game show filmed in Mozambique in October 2012 before it has even aired. ITV sources have claimed it was supposed to be shown in the spring to compete with BBC One's The Voice, but was considered not to be very good. Prize Island eventually begins airing in October, going out in a Sunday afternoon slot. |
| 26 | Charlotte Moore is appointed as Controller of BBC One, replacing Danny Cohen, who was given the role of Director of Television in April. |

=== July ===
| Date | Event |
|---|---|
| 5 | The BBC announces it is suspending production of 3D programming indefinitely, due to a "lack of public appetite" for the technology. |
| 8 | Audience figures show Andy Murray's victory in the previous day's Wimbledon Men's Singles final was watched by 17.3 million viewers, making it the most watched programme of the year so far. |
| 8 | Drama is launched by UKTV, replacing Blighty. The channel also launches on free-to-air platform Freeview. However it does not launch on Virgin Media until August. |
| 9 | A special last-minute scene is filmed for inclusion in the day's episode of EastEnders reflecting Andy Murray's Wimbledon victory. |
| 9 | The BBC confirms that Barbara Windsor will return to EastEnders as Peggy Mitchell for a one-off appearance. |
| 16 | After 5 series and 4 years, the final episode of the 2009 series of Horrible Histories is broadcast on CBBC. |
| 17 | Police confirm that a body found at Seaford, East Sussex on 12 July is that of Paul Bhattacharjee, an actor who disappeared on 10 July. Bhattacharjee had appeared in the 2006 James Bond film Casino Royale, and EastEnders. |
| 17 | Leah Totton, a medical doctor from Derry, Northern Ireland wins the ninth series of The Apprentice, and a £250,000 investment from Lord Sugar in her planned cosmetic procedures business. |
| 19 | An update of Freeview's software leaves owners of Sony DVD recorders unable to access or record Freeview channels through the devices. |
| 21 | For the past three consecutive weeks in July 2013, Channel 5 has beaten Channel 4 in terms of daily average share for the week, excluding +1. However, this time since its launch in 1997, Channel 5 (on a 5% share) beat Channel 4 (on a 4.94% share) in terms of daily average share for the week including +1. |
| 26 | Former BBC broadcaster Stuart Hall has his fifteen-month sentence for a series of indecent assaults doubled to 30 months by the Court of Appeal after the Attorney General launched an appeal against the leniency of the original sentence. |

=== August ===
| Date | Event |
|---|---|
| 2 | The Fox Broadcasting Company announce plans to remake ITV's popular crime drama, Broadchurch for a US market. |
| 4 | Scottish actor Peter Capaldi is unveiled as the Twelfth Doctor in a BBC One special, Doctor Who Live: The Next Doctor. |
| 7 | An advert featuring a team "rescuing" neglected jars of Marmite has received 278 complaints from viewers since it was first shown two days earlier. |
| 12 | Paddy Roberts becomes the first male £250,000 winner on Deal or No Deal. |
| 14 | Sky News cameraman Mick Deane is shot dead while covering protests following July's coup d'état in Egypt. |
| 19 | Sam Evans wins Big Brother 14. |
| 20 | Top Boy returns to Channel 4 for a second four-part series. |
| 28 | UK television debut of the Australian prison drama Wentworth on Channel 5. The opening episode of the Prisoner Cell Block H reboot attracts an audience of 2.4 million. |
| 29 | Thirty years of Blockbusters. |
| 31 | Sharon Osbourne returns to The X Factor after six years. |

=== September ===
| Date | Event |
|---|---|
| 5 | It is reported that Coronation Street will explore the issue of the right to die when the character Hayley Cropper decides she wants to take her own life after being diagnosed with terminal pancreatic cancer. |
| 5 | Lauren Lambert wins Cycle 9 of Britain & Ireland's Next Top Model. |
| 6 | Ade Edmondson wins the 2013 series of Celebrity MasterChef. |
| 10 | Michael Le Vell is cleared of child sex allegations following a trial at Manchester Crown Court. |
| 11 | Singer Kylie Minogue will join The Voice UK as a coach when the series returns in 2014. |
| 12 | Debut of the period crime drama Peaky Blinders on BBC Two. |
| 13 | Reality television star Charlotte Crosby wins the twelfth series of Celebrity Big Brother. |
| 14 | Holly Willoughby and Reggie Yates announce their exit from The Voice UK, with new presenter Emma Willis confirmed to co-host the 2014 series. |
| 16 | ITV re-introduces sub-regional news coverage across England. The weekday daytime, late evening and weekend bulletins as well as 20 minutes of the 6pm programme are once again more localised. |
| 17 | Marvin Humes announced as Reggie Yates replacement on The Voice UK. He will co-host the third series alongside Emma Willis. |
| 18 | Sue Barker announces she is stepping down as host of BBC Sports Personality of the Year after 19 years. |
| 20 | The day's episode of EastEnders sees a one-off appearance of Barbara Windsor as Peggy Mitchell. |
| 26 | BBC economics editor Stephanie Flanders will leave the BBC to take up a position at JP Morgan Asset Management. |
| 27 | Prime Minister David Cameron confirms he will not have a television debate with Scottish First Minister Alex Salmond ahead of next year's referendum on Scottish independence. |
| 27 | A Radio Times article reports that a leaked internal BBC document casts doubt on the existence of TV detector vans after it makes no mention of them in a detailed discussion of the TV licence fee. The BBC subsequently responds by saying the vans do exist, but will not provide further details about how many are in operation. |

=== October ===
| Date | Event |
|---|---|
| 1 | After series one of Wentworth continues to prove popular with viewers, Channel 5 announces it has acquired the UK broadcasting rights for series two. The series will air in 2014. |
| 3 | ITV celebrates twenty-five years of This Morning, with its original hosts Richard Madeley and Judy Finnigan returning to join Phillip Schofield, Holly Willoughby, Eamonn Holmes and Ruth Langsford to present a special live edition from the show's original home at Royal Albert Dock, Liverpool. |
| 6 | Speaking at the Cheltenham Literary Festival to promote his book, Great Britain's Great War, Newsnight presenter Jeremy Paxman criticises schools for using episodes of Blackadder Goes Forth to teach students about World War I, saying the practice is "astonishing". |
| 7 | It is reported that the comedy Open All Hours will return for a one-off special over Christmas. The episode, titled Still Open All Hours will see David Jason reprise his role as Granville. |
| 8 | BBC Director-General Tony Hall announces plans to launch a BBC One +1 channel, and offer a 30-day catch-up service on the iPlayer. |
| 8 | Downton Abbey creator Julian Fellowes defends a controversial rape storyline in the latest episode of the ITV series following a number of complaints. |
| 11 | Nine missing episodes from the 1968 Doctor Who series The Web of Fear and The Enemy of the World are made available for download from the BBC website after they were found at a television station in Nigeria. |
| 12 | The BBC says it "completely rejects" allegations by Daily Mail editor Paul Dacre that coverage of an article the paper published about Labour leader Ed Miliband's father was "one-sided". |
| 16 | BBC Director-General Tony Hall unveils the corporation's four-year plan for World War I centenary programming and coverage. This will include an online resource allowing access to records kept by the Imperial War Museum, and a documentary about Keith Murdoch (the father of Rupert Murdoch) who, as a young war correspondent, revealed the disastrous nature of the Gallipoli Campaign in 1916, changing the direction of the war. |
| 17 | Robert Peston is appointed as BBC Economics Editor, replacing Stephanie Flanders. |
| 22 | Stuart Hall is stripped of his OBE following his conviction for sexual offences against young girls. |
| 22 | Frances Quinn wins the fourth series of The Great British Bake Off. |
| 22 | ITV confirms that Who Wants to Be a Millionaire? will end after fifteen years on air as presenter Chris Tarrant steps down from the role. |
| 23 | Comedian Russell Brand appears as a guest on Newsnight to mark his one-off stint as guest editor of the New Statesman, and tells presenter Jeremy Paxman he has never voted because of an "absolute indifference and weariness and exhaustion from the lies, treachery and deceit of the political class". Paxman criticises Brand's stance on the programme, but later tells the Radio Times that he himself did not vote at a recent election, that there is something "irresistible" about the comedian, and that "part of [his] diagnosis is right. There is a huge sense of disillusion out there." |
| 25 | The BBC hosts 100 Women, a day of debate and discussion across radio, television and online featuring a hundred women from around the world. |
| 28 | Lord Sugar confirms that the tenth series of The Apprentice has been pushed back to Autumn 2014 to avoid clashing with the 2014 World Cup. Young Apprentice has also been axed. |
| 29 | The BBC announce that The Sky at Night will be shown exclusively on BBC Four from 2014, ending a 54-year run on the corporation's flagship channel. |
| 31 | TV cameras are allowed into the Court of Appeal for the first time, after a change in the law allowing proceedings to be recorded. |
| 31 | Journalist and presenter Paris Lees becomes the first openly transgender panellist to appear on the BBC's Question Time. |

=== November ===
| Date | Event |
|---|---|
| 9 | BT announces a £897 million deal with UEFA to broadcast the Champions League exclusively on BT Sport from the 2015–16 season for three years, ending two decades of the competition being broadcast free-to-air on ITV. |
| 11 | Panorama becomes the first ongoing British TV programme to reach and celebrate its 60th anniversary. |
| 12 | Alan Titchmarsh steps down as presenter of the BBC's coverage of the Chelsea Flower Show after 30 years in the role and following the BBC's decision to revamp its coverage of the event. |
| 12 | Actor Sir Tony Robinson says that Prince William has agreed to make a cameo appearance in Blackadder if another series is recorded. |
| 12 | Laura Kuenssberg will leave ITV to return to the BBC as chief correspondent and a presenter of Newsnight from February 2014, it is announced. She will replace Gavin Esler in the latter role. |
| 13 | After 24 years and 70 episodes, Agatha Christie's Poirot airs its final episode, Curtain: Poirot's Last Case which sees main character Hercule Poirot killed off. As a result, David Suchet who portrayed Poirot (and is considered the most faithful to the books) has portrayed the character in every major adaptation of the stories that the character appears in. |
| 18 | James Bond will return to terrestrial television after ITV signs a deal with MGM Worldwide Television to air the films, which were snapped up by BSkyB in an agreement with the distributors in 2012. The new deal enables ITV to air the television premiere of Skyfall in 2014. |
| 20 | At the Salford Media Festival in Manchester, Scottish Culture Secretary Fiona Hyslop says that an independent Scotland would have a new licence fee funded broadcaster based on the assets and staff of BBC Scotland. |
| 23 | Doctor Who celebrates its 50th anniversary by airing a special episode, "The Day of the Doctor". Overnight viewing figures suggest it was watched by 10.2 million viewers. |
| 26 | The Scottish Government publishes Scotland's Future, its white paper laying out the case for an independent Scotland, and the means through which this would be achieved. Among the proposals are plans to replace BBC Scotland with a Scottish Broadcasting Service, although the body would continue to have close ties with the BBC, including airing content such as Doctor Who and EastEnders. |
| 27 | Addressing The Voice of the Listener and Viewer conference, BBC Director-General Tony Hall says the BBC should be "more aggressive" and "less British" in its defence of the television licence. |
| 28 | Virgin Media switches off its analogue TV service in Milton Keynes. This had been the last analogue television service which had still been in operation in the UK and brings to an end all forms of analogue television in the United Kingdom. |
| 29 | The new Coronation Street set at dock10, MediaCityUK in Salford is officially unveiled. |
| 30 | The Bible makes its British television debut on Channel 5. |

=== December ===
| Date | Event |
|---|---|
| 2 | More than 44,000 people have signed a Change.org petition calling for reality television star Katie Hopkins to be banned from television after a Twitter posting in which she made a joke about Scottish life expectancy in the wake of the Glasgow helicopter crash that resulted in several fatalities. Hopkins responds that she was referring to a recent NHS report discussing the country's average life expectancy and apologises for any offence caused. |
| 5–6 | The death of former South African President Nelson Mandela leads to several schedule changes, including extended news coverage and special documentaries paying tribute to him. |
| 6 | Figures published by Broadcast magazine indicate that in 2013, ITV achieved its first increase in audience share since 1990, rising from 15.7% in 2012 to 16.5% this year. ITV is also the only one of the five main terrestrial channels to increase its viewership over the past year, while Channel 4 saw a drop from 6.5% to 5.8%. The decrease is attributed to the 2012 boost Channel 4 had in its viewers because of its coverage of that year's Summer Paralympics. |
| 8 | Westlife singer Kian Egan wins the thirteenth series of I'm a Celebrity...Get Me Out of Here!. |
| 9 | EastEnders marks the death of Nelson Mandela with a specially recorded scene in which Carol Jackson (Lindsay Coulson) and Denise Fox (Diane Parish) recall Mandela's release from prison in 1990. |
| 10 | The BBC launches five new high-definition simulcasts of BBC News, BBC Three, BBC Four, CBBC and CBeebies. |
| 10 | The Channel 4 daytime quiz Fifteen to One, which recently featured as a one-off special as part of an 80s Nostalgia evening, is to return for a full series in Spring 2014 with Sandi Toksvig as host. A celebrity version will be presented by Adam Hills. |
| 12 | BBC One's Question Time is broadcast from South Africa to discuss the legacy of Nelson Mandela following his recent death. |
| 12 | Steven Edwards wins the sixth series of MasterChef: The Professionals. |
| 13 | The media regulator Ofcom says that complaints about BT TV have more than doubled since the launch of BT Sport in August. |
| 15 | 2013 Wimbledon men's singles winner Andy Murray is named this year's BBC Sports Personality of the Year. |
| 15 | Sam Bailey wins the tenth series of The X Factor. |
| 17 | Ofcom reports that a Comic Relief sketch featuring Rowan Atkinson as a fictional Archbishop of Canterbury was the most complained about television broadcast of the year, although Ofcom ruled in July that it did not breach the regulations. |
| 17 | Channel 4 has commissioned three pilot comedy shows for the New Year. Flack will star Sheridan Smith as a PR woman struggling to keep her life on track. Catastrophe will see Sharon Horgan and Rob Delaney respectively star as an Irish woman and American man who struggle to fall in love against the backdrop of contemporary London. Sit.Com, written by and starring David Baddiel, is a family sitcom highlighting the distractions of modern technology. |
| 21 | It is reported that former Channel 5 chief executive David Elstein will call for the abolition of the licence fee and suggest the BBC introduce a subscription model when the Culture, Media and Sport Committee convenes to discuss the future of the Corporation in January 2014. |
| 21 | Model Abbey Clancy and dancing partner Aljaž Skorjanec win the eleventh series of Strictly Come Dancing. |
| 22 | Defence Minister Anna Soubry apologises after comments made on an edition of The Andrew Marr Show in which she described UKIP leader Nigel Farage as looking "like somebody has put their finger up his bottom and he really rather likes it". |
| 24 | British television premiere of Walt Disney's 1940 animated classic Fantasia is aired on BBC Two for the first time. |
| 24 | Ben & Holly's Little Kingdom airs its final episode. |
| 25 | Matt Smith makes his final full appearance as the Eleventh Doctor in the Doctor Who episode "The Time of the Doctor"; his successor, Peter Capaldi, makes a minor appearance as the Twelfth Doctor at the episode's conclusion. |
| 26 | Overnight viewing figures indicate that Mrs. Brown's Boys was the most watched show on Christmas Day, with an audience of 9.4 million. The BBC claimed four of the five most watched programmes on Christmas Day. |
| 27 | Still Open All Hours was the most watched programme on Boxing Day, attracting an audience of 10 million. On ITV, the terrestrial television premiere of Harry Potter and the Deathly Hallows – Part 1 was watched by an average audience of 4.3 million. |

== Debuts ==
=== BBC ===
| Date | Debut | Channel |
|---|---|---|
| 2 January | Africa | BBC One |
| 4 January | The Dumping Ground | CBBC |
| 5 January | Britain's Brightest | BBC One |
| 5 January | Richard Hammond's Secret Service | BBC One |
| 5 January | Animal Antics | BBC One |
| 6 January | An Drochaid/The Bridge Rising | BBC Alba |
| 6 January | The A to Z of TV Gardening | BBC Two |
| 7 January | The Polar Bear Family & Me | BBC Two |
| 7 January | The Battle for Malta | BBC Two |
| 7 January | Fit | CBBC |
| 7 January | Baby Makers: The Fertility Clinic | BBC Four |
| 10 January | Carved with Love: The Genius of British Woodwork | BBC Four |
| 11 January | Alba | BBC Alba |
| 13 January | Blandings | BBC One |
| 14 January | Father Brown | BBC One |
| 14 January | Why the Industrial Revolution Happened Here | BBC Two |
| 15 January | Locomotion: Dan Snow's History of Railways | BBC Two |
| 16 January | Funny Business | BBC Two |
| 17 January | Winterwatch Unsprung | BBC Two |
| 17 January | Dani's Castle | CBBC |
| 17 January | Fierce Earth | CBBC |
| 18 January | An Evening with Glen Campbell | BBC Four |
| 19 January | Who Let the Dogs Out and About? | CBBC |
| 22 January | Allotment Wars | BBC One |
| 23 January | Absolute Genius with Dick and Dom | CBBC |
| 23 January | David Attenborough – The Early Years | BBC Red Button |
| 23 January | Bob Servant Independent | BBC Four |
| 24 January | The Genius of Invention | BBC Two |
| 25 January | An Ode to Burns and Ulster | BBC Two |
| 27 January | Wonders of Life | BBC Two |
| 29 January | The Mary Berry Story | BBC Two |
| 31 January | The Planners | BBC Two |
| 1 February | Monty Don's French Gardens | BBC Two |
| 1 February | A Concert for Bangladesh Revisited | BBC Four |
| 4 February | Am Prionnsa Beag/The Little Prince | BBC Alba |
| 4 February | Dancing on the Edge | BBC Two |
| 6 February | Brain Doctora | BBC Two |
| 12 February | The Railway: Keeping Britain On Track | BBC Two |
| 15 February | The Beatles' Please Please Me: Remaking a Classic | BBC Four |
| 16 February | How To Be Epic @ Everything | CBBC |
| 18 February | Britain's Empty Homes Revisited | BBC One |
| 18 February | City of Culture Film | BBC Two Northern Ireland |
| 21 February | Beneath the Lab Coat | BBC Two |
| 22 February | Wild Arabia | BBC Two |
| 24 February | Dan Cruickshank's Written in Stone | BBC One Northern Ireland |
| 3 March | Boxing at the Movies: Kings of the Ring | BBC Four |
| 4 March | Beat the Pack | BBC One |
| 4 March | The Great British Winter | BBC Two |
| 5 March | Bluestone 42 | BBC Three |
| 11 March | Caught Red Handed | BBC One |
| 11 March | Country Show Cook Off | BBC Two |
| 12 March | Beyond Time: William Turnbull | BBC Four |
| 14 March | Lee Nelson's Well Funny People | BBC Three |
| 17 March | In the Flesh | BBC Three |
| 18 March | The Challenger Disaster | BBC Two |
| 18 March | Can Eating Insects Save the World | BBC Four |
| 23 March | Britain's Natural World | BBC Four |
| 24 March | Driven: The Fastest Woman in the World | BBC Two |
| 31 March | The Village | BBC One |
| 2 April | The Great British Sewing Bee | BBC Two |
| 2 April | Crossing England in a Punt: River of Dreams | BBC Four |
| 8 April | Chefs: Put Your Menu Where You Mouth Is | BBC One |
| 25 April | The Politician's Husband | BBC Two |
| 29 April | Dave Allen: God's Own Comedian | BBC Two |
| 30 April | Sweat the Small Stuff | BBC Three |
| 9 May | Dance with the Elements | BBC Two |
| 12 May | Emeli Sande Live in London | BBC Three |
| 13 May | The Fall | BBC Two |
| 13 May | The Chef's Protege | BBC Two |
| 13 May | Cusile | BBC Two |
| 14 May | Frankie | BBC One |
| 16 May | The Dambusters: 70 Years On | BBC Two |
| 18 May | Ceolraidh | BBC Alba |
| 19 May | Ice Age Giants | BBC Two |
| 20 May | Don't Get Done in the Sun | BBC One |
| 21 May | The Cleveland Captives: What Really Happened? | BBC Three |
| 22 May | Enlighten Up! | BBC Two |
| 25 May | David Bowie – Five Years | BBC Two |
| 25 May | Cannes 2013 | BBC News Channel |
| 27 May | Dive WWII: Our Secret History | BBC One Northern Ireland |
| 30 May | DNN | CBBC |
| 1 June | Curtain Call | BBC Two |
| 4 June | The Call Centre | BBC Three |
| 13 June | Rory Goes to Holyrood | BBC Two Scotland |
| 16 June | The White Queen | BBC One |
| 18 June | The Route Masters: Running London's Roads | BBC Two |
| 4 July | Supermarket Secrets | BBC One |
| 8 July | Count Arthur Strong | BBC Two |
| 13 July | Top of the Lake | BBC Two |
| 16 July | Family Tree | BBC Two |
| 23 July | Badults | BBC Three |
| 27 July | Break the Safe | BBC One |
| 3 August | I Love My Country | BBC One |
| 10 August | That Puppet Game Show | BBC One |
| 16 August | Big School | BBC One |
| 25 August | What Remains | BBC One |
| 13 September | The House that £100k Built | BBC Two |
| 18 September | Father Figure | BBC One |
| 20 September | David Attenborough's Rise of Animals: Triumph of the Vertebrates | BBC Two |
| 22 September | By Any Means | BBC One |
| 22 September | The Crane Gang | BBC Two |
| 24 September | The Wrong Mans | BBC Two |
| 2 October | The Great British Year | BBC Four |
| 3 October | Hotel of Mum and Dad | BBC Three |
| 10 October | Truckers | BBC One |
| 21 October | Iceland Foods: Life in The Freezer Cabinet | BBC Two |
| 22 October | Fox Wars | BBC One |
| 23 October | Ambassadors | BBC Two |
| 29 October | The Escape Artist | BBC One |
| 4 November | Pressure Pad | BBC One |
| 13 November | Tudor Monastery Farm | BBC Two |
| 17 November | Britain and the Sea | BBC One |
| 20 November | Backchat | BBC Three |
| 21 November | An Adventure in Space and Time | BBC Two |
| 25 November | Referendum Documentaries | BBC Two Scotland & BBC Parliament |
| 29 November | Wild Burma: Nature's Lost Kingdom | BBC Two |
| 9 December | Great British Garden Revival | BBC Two |
| 18 December | The Great Train Robbery | BBC One |
| 26 December | Gangsta Granny | BBC One |
| 26 December | Death Comes to Pemberley | BBC One |
| 30 December | The Thirteenth Tale | BBC Two |
| 30 December | Sacred Wonders of Britain | BBC Two |
| 31 December | Two Doors Down | BBC One Scotland |

=== ITV ===
| Date | Debut | Channel |
|---|---|---|
| 3 January | Fake Reaction | ITV2 |
| 5 January | Splash! | ITV |
| 6 January | Mr Selfridge | ITV |
| 6 January | The Magaluf Weekender | ITV2 |
| 11 January | Great Night Out | ITV |
| 31 January | The Big Reunion | ITV2 |
| 13 February | From the Heart | ITV |
| 27 February | Food Glorious Food | ITV |
| 27 February | Lightfields | ITV |
| 4 March | Broadchurch | ITV |
| 18 March | James Nesbitt's Ireland | ITV |
| 25 March | Plebs | ITV2 |
| 1 April | Cook Me the Money | ITV |
| 7 April | Off Their Rockers | ITV |
| 13 April | The Security Men | ITV |
| 18 April | The British Animal Honours | ITV |
| 19 April | The Ice Cream Girls | ITV |
| 20 April | Saturday Farm | ITV |
| 21 April | Country House Sunday | ITV |
| 29 April | Vicious | ITV |
| 29 April | The Job Lot | ITV |
| 5 June | Love and Marriage | ITV |
| 9 June | Tipping Point: Lucky Stars | ITV |
| 29 June | Your Face Sounds Familiar | ITV |
| 22 July | Take on the Twisters | ITV |
| 31 July | You Saw Them Here First | ITV |
| 19 August | Star Treatment | ITV |
| 22 August | Poaching Wars with Tom Hardy | ITV |
| 31 August | Stepping Out | ITV |
| 3 September | Aussie Animal Island | ITV |
| 3 September | Ade in Adland | ITV |
| 4 September | Big Star's Little Star | ITV |
| 5 September | Pat & Cabbage | ITV |
| 5 September | The Guilty | ITV |
| 5 September | The Big Reunion: On Tour | ITV |
| 13 September | Gino's Italian Escape | ITV |
| 17 September | Crazy Beaches | ITV2 |
| 2 October | I Want That Car | ITV4 |
| 5 October | The Munch Box | ITV & CITV |
| 6 October | Inside the National Trust | ITV4 |
| 8 October | Duck Dynasty | ITV4 |
| 10 October | Tricked | ITV2 |
| 10 October | Breathless | ITV |
| 27 October | Sunday Side Up | ITV |
| 27 October | Sunday Scoop | ITV |
| 27 October | Prize Island | ITV |
| 28 October | Tales from Northumberland with Robson Green | ITV |
| 1 November | Off the Beaten Track | ITV |
| 25 November | Show Me the Telly | ITV |
| 11 December | Lucan | ITV |
| 21 December | The Illusionists | ITV |
| 25 December | River Deep Mountain High: James Nesbitt in New Zealand | ITV |

=== Channel 4 ===
| Date | Debut | Channel |
|---|---|---|
| 2 January | Gok's Style Secrets | Channel 4 |
| 7 January | Face the Clock | Channel 4 |
| 11 January | First Time Farmers | Channel 4 |
| 15 January | Utopia | Channel 4 |
| 18 February | The Common Denominator | Channel 4 |
| 7 March | Gogglebox | Channel 4 |
| 4 April | The Intern | Channel 4 |
| 6 April | Five Minutes to a Fortune | Channel 4 |
| 10 June | Dates | Channel 4 |
| 24 June | Brendan's Magical Mystery Tour | Channel 4 |
| 28 July | The Mill | Channel 4 |
| 1 August | How to Get a Council House | Channel 4 |
| 18 September | The Three Day Nanny | Channel 4 |
| 6 October | Was It Something I Said? | Channel 4 |
| 29 December | Speed with Guy Martin | Channel 4 |
| Unknown | Labyrinth | Channel 4 |

=== Channel 5 ===
| Date | Debut | Channel |
|---|---|---|
| 11 June | Gibraltar: Britain in the Sun | Channel 5 |
| 8 July | News Talk Live | Channel 5 |
| 28 August | Wentworth | Channel 5 |
| 8 October | The Dog Rescuers | Channel 5 |
| 30 November | The Bible | Channel 5 |

=== Other channels ===
| Date | Debut | Channel |
|---|---|---|
| 8 February | Henry Hugglemonster | Disney Junior |
| 10 March | Ed Stafford: Naked and Marooned | Discovery Channel |
| 10 June | Ape Man | National Geographic Channel |
| 16 June | Jo Brand's Great Wall of Comedy | Gold |
| 17 September | Dave Gorman: Modern Life is Goodish | Dave |
| 10 November | Yonderland | Sky 1 |

== Channels ==
=== New channels ===
| Date | Channel |
|---|---|
| 4 February | More4 HD |
| 26 March | BBC Two HD |
| 28 March | Sky Movies Disney |
| 28 March | Sky Movies Disney HD |
| 30 April | Investigation Discovery +1 |
| 30 April | TLC |
| 30 April | TLC +1 |
| 30 April | TLC HD |
| 03 May | Geo Tez |
| 4 June | True Drama |
| 8 July | Drama |
| 22 July | Kix Power |
| 1 August | BT Sport 1 |
| 1 August | BT Sport 1 HD |
| 1 August | BT Sport 2 |
| 1 August | BT Sport 2 HD |
| 13 August | TCM +1 |
| 1 October | Kix +1 |
| 4 November | Lifetime |
| 4 November | Lifetime +1 |
| 10 December | BBC Three HD |
| 10 December | BBC Four HD |
| 10 December | BBC News HD |
| 10 December | CBBC HD |
| 10 December | CBeebies HD |

=== Defunct channels ===
| Date | Channel |
|---|---|
| 26 March | BBC HD |
| 28 March | Disney Cinemagic |
| 28 March | Disney Cinemagic +1 |
| 28 March | Disney Cinemagic HD |
| 30 April | Discovery Real Time |
| 30 April | Discovery Real Time +1 |
| 30 April | Discovery Travel & Living |
| 30 April | DMAX +2 |
| 5 July | Blighty |
| 31 July | ESPN America |
| 31 July | ESPN America HD |
| 31 July | ESPN Classic |
| 12 August | TCM 2 |
| 17 August | Sky Movies 007 HD |
| 1 October | Kix Power |
| 4 November | Bio. |

=== Rebranding channels ===
| Date | Old Name | New Name |
|---|---|---|
| 11 January | FX | Fox |
| 11 January | FX + | Fox + |
| 11 January | FX HD | Fox HD |
| 14 January | ITV1 | ITV |
| 14 January | ITV1 +1 | ITV +1 |
| 14 January | ITV1 HD | ITV HD |
| 7 October | Pick TV | Pick |
| 7 October | Pick TV +1 | Pick +1 |

== Television shows ==
=== Changes of network affiliation ===
| Show | Moved from | Moved to |
|---|---|---|
| The Grand National | BBC One & BBC Two | Channel 4 |
| American Idol | ITV2 | 5* |
| The Paul O'Grady Show | Channel 4 | ITV |
| M*A*S*H | Comedy Central Extra | True Entertainment |
| Charlie Brooker's ...wipe | BBC Four | BBC Two |

=== Returning this year after a break of one year or longer ===
| Programme | Date(s) of original removal | Original channel(s) | Date of return | New channel(s) |
|---|---|---|---|---|
| Yes, Prime Minister | 28 January 1988 | BBC Two | 15 January 2013 | Gold |
| Ant & Dec's Saturday Night Takeaway | 21 March 2009 | ITV | 23 February 2013 | N/A (Same channel as original) |
| Catchphrase | 19 December 2002 | ITV | 7 April 2013 | N/A (Same channel as original) |
| Through the Keyhole | 4 June 2008 | ITV, BBC One & BBC Two | 31 August 2013 | ITV |
| Eliot Kid | 27 June 2012 | CBBC | 2 September 2013 | POP |
| Fifteen to One | 19 December 2003 | Channel 4 | 20 September 2013 | N/A (Same channel as original) |
| The Paul O'Grady Show | 23 December 2005; 18 December 2009 | ITV; Channel 4 | 11 November 2013 | ITV |
| Open All Hours as Still Open All Hours | 26 March 1976; 25 April 1982; 6 October 1985 | BBC Two; BBC One | 26 December 2013 | BBC One |

== Continuing television shows ==
=== 1920s ===
| Programme | Date |
|---|---|
| BBC Wimbledon | 1927–1939, 1946–2019, 2021–present |

=== 1930s ===
| Programme | Date |
|---|---|
| Trooping the Colour | 1937–1939, 1946–2019, 2023–present |
| The Boat Race | 1938–1939, 1946–2019, 2021–present |

=== 1950s ===
| Programme | Date |
|---|---|
| Panorama | 1953–present |
| The Sky at Night | 1957–present |
| Final Score | 1958–present |
| Blue Peter | 1958–present |

=== 1960s ===
| Programme | Date |
|---|---|
| Coronation Street | 1960–present |
| Points of View | 1961–present |
| Songs of Praise | 1961–present |
| University Challenge | 1962–1987, 1994–present |
| Doctor Who | 1963–1989, 1996, 2005–present |
| Match of the Day | 1964–present |
| Top of the Pops | 1964–present |
| Gardeners' World | 1968–present |

=== 1970s ===
| Programme | Date |
|---|---|
| Question of Sport | 1970–present |
| Emmerdale | 1972–present |
| Mastermind | 1972–present |
| Newsround | 1972–present |
| Arena | 1975–present |
| One Man and His Dog | 1976–present |
| Top Gear | 1977–present |
| Ski Sunday | 1978–present |
| Antiques Roadshow | 1979–present |
| Question Time | 1979–present |

=== 1980s ===
| Programme | Date |
|---|---|
| Family Fortunes | 1980–1985, 1987–2002, 2006–present |
| Children in Need | 1980–present |
| Countdown | 1982–present |
| Channel 4 Racing | 1984–2016 |
| Thomas & Friends | 1984–present |
| EastEnders | 1985–present |
| Comic Relief | 1985–present |
| Catchphrase | 1986–2002, 2013–present |
| Casualty | 1986–present |
| This Morning | 1988–present |
| Countryfile | 1988–present |
| Red Dwarf | 1988–1999, 2009–present |
| Agatha Christie's Poirot | 1989–2013 |

=== 1990s ===
| Programme | Date |
|---|---|
| Have I Got News for You | 1990–present |
| MasterChef | 1990–2001, 2005–present |
| Junior MasterChef | 1994, 2010–2014 |
| Room 101 | 1994–2007, 2012–2018 |
| The National Lottery Draws | 1994–2017 |
| Top of the Pops 2 | 1994–2017 |
| Hollyoaks | 1995–present |
| Soccer AM | 1995–present |
| Never Mind the Buzzcocks | 1996–2015 |
| Silent Witness | 1996–present |
| Midsomer Murders | 1997–present |
| Y Clwb Rygbi, Wales | 1997–present |
| Who Wants to Be a Millionaire? | 1998–2014 |
| British Soap Awards | 1999–2019, 2022–present |
| Holby City | 1999–2022 |

=== 2000s ===
| Programme | Date |
2000
| Big Brother | 2000–present |
| Bargain Hunt | 2000–present |
| BBC Breakfast | 2000–present |
| Click | 2000–present |
| Doctors | 2000–present |
| A Place in the Sun | 2000–present |
| The Unforgettable | 2000–present |
| Unreported World | 2000–present |
2001
| Celebrity Big Brother | 2001–present |
| BBC South East Today | 2001–present |
| Football Focus | 2001–present |
| Rogue Traders | 2001–present |
2002
| Escape to the Country | 2002–present |
| Fifth Gear | 2002–2016 |
| Flog It! | 2002–present |
| Foyle's War | 2002–2015 |
| I'm a Celebrity...Get Me Out of Here! | 2002–present |
| In It to Win It | 2002–2016 |
| Inside Out | 2002–present |
| River City | 2002–2026 |
| Saturday Kitchen | 2002–present |
2003
| Daily Politics | 2003–present |
| QI | 2003–present |
| Peep Show | 2003–2015 |
| This Week | 2003–present |
| Celebrity Mastermind | 2003–present |
| New Tricks | 2003–2015 |
| Eggheads | 2003–present |
| Extraordinary People | 2003–present |
| Grumpy Old Men | 2003–present |
| Homes Under the Hammer | 2003–present |
| Traffic Cops | 2003–present |
2004
| Doc Martin | 2004–2019 |
| Match of the Day 2 | 2004–present |
| Shameless | 2004–2013 |
| Strictly Come Dancing | 2004–present |
| The X Factor | 2004–2018 |
| 60 Minute Makeover | 2004–2014 |
| Agatha Christie's Marple | 2004–2013 |
| The Big Fat Quiz of the Year | 2004–present |
| The Culture Show | 2004–present |
| Football First | 2004–present |
| The Gadget Show | 2004–present |
| Live at the Apollo | 2004–present |
| NewsWatch | 2004–present |
| SadlerVision | 2004–present |
| Strictly Come Dancing: It Takes Two | 2004–present |
| Who Do You Think You Are? | 2004–present |
2005
| 8 Out of 10 Cats | 2005–present |
| Deal or No Deal | 2005–2016 |
| The Andrew Marr Show | 2005–present |
| The Adventure Show | 2005–present |
| The Apprentice | 2005–present |
| Britain & Ireland's Next Top Model | 2005–2013 |
| Dragons' Den | 2005–present |
| The F Word | 2005–present |
| The Hotel Inspector | 2005–present |
| The Jeremy Kyle Show | 2005–present |
| Mock the Week | 2005–present |
| Springwatch | 2005–present |
| Ukwia | 2005–present |
2006
| Dancing on Ice | 2006–2014 |
| Waterloo Road | 2006–present |
| The Album Chart Show | 2006–present |
| Animal Spies! | 2006–present |
| The Apprentice: You're Fired! | 2006–present |
| Banged Up Abroad | 2006–present |
| Charlie Brooker's Screenwipe | 2006–present |
| Cricket AM | 2006–present |
| Dickinson's Real Deal | 2006–present |
| Don't Get Done, Get Dom | 2006–present |
| Lewis | 2006–2015 |
| Monkey Life | 2006–present |
| Not Going Out | 2006–present |
| The One Show | 2006–present |
| People & Power | 2006–present |
| Peschardt's People | 2006–present |
| Secret Millionaire | 2006–present |
| The Slammer | 2006–2015 |
2007
| Britain's Got Talent | 2007–present |
| Outnumbered | 2007–2014 |
| Skins | 2007–2013 |
| Would I Lie to You? | 2007–present |
| The Alan Titchmarsh Show | 2007–2014 |
| Benidorm | 2007–present |
| The Big Questions | 2007–present |
| Don't Tell the Bride | 2007–present |
| Embarrassing Bodies | 2007–present |
| Escape from Scorpion Island | 2007–present |
| The Graham Norton Show | 2007–present |
| Harry & Paul | 2007–present |
| Heir Hunters | 2007–present |
| Helicopter Heroes | 2007–present |
| Inspector George Gently | 2007–present |
| An Island Parish | 2007–present |
| Jeff Randall Live | 2007–present |
| London Ink | 2007–present |
| Mary Queen of Shops | 2007–present |
| Primeval | 2007–present |
| Rapal | 2007–present |
| The Real MacKay | 2007–present |
| Real Rescues | 2007–present |
2008
| An Là | 2008–present |
| Argumental | 2008–present |
| Being Human | 2008–2013 |
| Big & Small | 2008–present |
| Bizarre ER | 2008–present |
| CCTV Cities | 2008–present |
| Celebrity Juice | 2008–present |
| Chuggington | 2008–present |
| Country House Rescue | 2008–present |
| The Hot Desk | 2008–present |
| House Guest | 2008–present |
| It Pays to Watch! | 2008–present |
| Only Connect | 2008–present |
| Police Interceptors | 2008–present |
| Rubbernecker | 2008–present |
| Rude Tube | 2008–present |
| Seachd Là | 2008–present |
| Snog Marry Avoid? | 2008–2013 |
| Supersize vs Superskinny | 2008–2014 |
| Wallander | 2008–2016 |
2009
| Miranda | 2009–2015 |
| PhoneShop | 2009–2013 |
| Pointless | 2009–present |
| Rip Off Britain | 2009–present |
| Russell Howard's Good News | 2009–2015 |
| Sesame Tree | 2009–2013 |
| The Chase | 2009–present |
| The Cube | 2009–2015 |
| Alan Carr: Chatty Man | 2009–2016 |
| Bang Goes the Theory | 2009–2014 |
| Cast Offs | 2009–present |
| Copycats | 2009–present |
| Countrywise | 2009–present |
| Cowboy Trap | 2009–present |
| Fern Britton Meets... | 2009–present |
| The Football League Show | 2009–2015 |
| Four Weddings | 2009–present |
| Grow Your Own Drugs | 2009–present |
| Horrible Histories | 2009–2013 |
| Inside Nature's Giants | 2009–present |
| Katie | 2009–present |
| Piers Morgan's Life Stories | 2009–present |
| Peter Andre: My Life | 2009–2013 |

=== 2010s ===
| Programme | Date |
2010
| Daybreak | 2010–2014 |
| DCI Banks | 2010–2016 |
| Downton Abbey | 2010–2015 |
| Eddie Stobart: Trucks & Trailers | 2010–2014 |
| The Great British Bake Off | 2010–present |
| Great British Railway Journeys | 2010–present |
| Him & Her | 2010–2013 |
| James May's Man Lab | 2010–2013 |
| Late Kick Off | 2010–present |
| A League of Their Own | 2010–present |
| Little Crackers | 2010–present |
| Lorraine | 2010–present |
| Luther | 2010–present |
| The Million Pound Drop | 2010–2015 |
| The Nightshift | 2010–2015 |
| The Only Way Is Essex | 2010–2015 |
| Pocket tv | 2010–2015 |
| Scream! If You Know the Answer | 2010–2015 |
| Sherlock | 2010–2015 |
| Stand Up for the Week | 2010–2013 |
| Strike-back | 2010–present |
| Sunday Morning Live | 2010–present |
| Take Me Out | 2010–2020 |
| The Trip | 2010–present |
| Turn Back Time – The High Street/ Turn Back Time – The Family | 2010–present |
2011
| All Over the Place | 2011–present |
| Black Mirror | 2011–present |
| Episodes | 2011–2017 |
| Four Rooms | 2011–present |
| The Field of Blood | 2011–2013 |
| Fresh Meat | 2011–2016 |
| Friday Download | 2011–present |
| Hacker Time | 2011–2016 |
| Horrible Histories: Gory Games | 2011–2018 |
| Junior Bake Off | 2011–present |
| Junior Doctors: Your Life in Their Hands | 2011–2013 |
| Made in Chelsea | 2011–present |
| Match of the Day Kickabout | 2011–present |
| Mad Dogs | 2011–2013 |
| Perfection | 2011–2015 |
| Ross Kemp: Extreme World | 2011–2017 |
| Sadie J | 2011–2013 |
| The Sparticle Mystery | 2011–2015 |
| Scott & Bailey | 2011–2016 |
| Sun, Sex and Suspicious Parents | 2011–present |
| Text Santa | 2011–2015 |
| The Jonathan Ross Show | 2011–present |
| Top Boy | 2011–2013, 2019–present |
| Trollied | 2011–present |
| Vera | 2011–2025 |
2012
| Endeavour | 2012–present |
| Call the Midwife | 2012–present |
| The Hoarder Next Door | 2012–2014 |
| The Midnight Beast | 2012–2014 |
| Prisoners' Wives | 2012–2013 |
| Pramface | 2012–2014 |
| The Sarah Millican Television Programme | 2012–2013 |
| The Syndicate | 2012–present |
| Stella | 2012–present |
| The Voice UK | 2012–present |
| Watson & Oliver | 2012–2013 |
| Line of Duty | 2012–present |
| Tipping Point | 2012–present |
| Lemon La Vida Loca | 2012–2013 |
| Hebburn | 2012–2013 |
| Ripper Street | 2012–2016 |
| Paul O'Grady: For the Love of Dogs | 2012–2023 |
| Bad Education | 2012–2014 |
| Last Tango in Halifax | 2012–present |
| Claimed and Shamed | 2012–present |
2013
| The Dumping Ground | 2013–present |
| The Dog Rescuers | 2013–present |
| Splash! | 2013–2014 |
| Big Star's Little Star | 2013–present |
| Two Doors Down | 2013, 2016–present |

== Ending this year ==
| Date(s) | Programme | Channel(s) | Debut(s) |
|---|---|---|---|
| 10 January | The Polar Bear Family & Me | BBC Two | 1985 |
| 6 February | Africa | BBC One | |
| 9 February | Britain's Brightest | BBC One | |
| 15 February | Great Night Out | ITV | |
| 21 February | Way To Go | BBC Three | |
| 22 February | Face the Clock | Channel 4 | |
| 28 February | 64 Zoo Lane | CBeebies | 1999 |
| 28 February | Junior Doctors: Your Life in Their Hands | BBC Three | 2011 |
| 8 March | Wild Arabia | BBC Two | 2013 |
| 10 March | Being Human | BBC Three | 2008 |
| 27 March | Lightfields | ITV | 2013 |
| 30 March | Life's Too Short | BBC Two | 2011 |
| 2 April | Heading Out | BBC Two | 2013 |
| 9 April | Alexander Armstrong's Big Ask | Dave | 2011 |
| 10 April | Anna & Katy | Channel 4 | 2011 |
| 19 April | The Common Denominator | Channel 4 | 2013 |
| 25 April | James May's Man Lab | BBC Two | 2010 |
| 6 May | James Nesbitt's Ireland | ITV | 2013 |
| 9 May | The Politician's Husband | BBC Two | 2013 |
| 28 May | The Wright Way | BBC One | 2013 |
| 28 May | Shameless | Channel 4 | 2004 |
| 30 May | Watson & Oliver | BBC Two | 2012 |
| 31 May | 1001 Things You Should Know | Channel 4 | 2012 |
| 1 June | An Audience with... | ITV & Channel 4 | 1980 |
| 2 June | Ice Age Giants | BBC Two | 2013 |
| 12 June | 10 O'Clock Live | Channel 4 | 2011 |
| 18 June | Frankie | BBC One | 2013 |
| 24 June | May the Best House Win | ITV | 2010 |
| 30 June | Rise of the Continents | BBC Two | 2013 |
| 10 July | Love and Marriage | ITV | 2013 |
| 11 July | Lemon La Vida Loca | ITV2 | 2012 |
| 19 July | Brendan's Magical Mystery Tour | Channel 4 | 2013 |
| 26 July | Horrible Histories | CBBC | 2009 |
| 3 August | Your Face Sounds Familiar | ITV | 2013 |
| 5 August | The Dales | ITV | 2011 |
| 5 August | Skins | E4 | 2007 |
| 9 August | The Field of Blood | BBC One | 2011 |
| 18 August | The White Queen | BBC One | 2013 |
| 28 August | Restoration Home | BBC Two | 2011 |
| 29 August | PhoneShop | Channel 4 | 2009 |
| 30 August | Take On the Twisters | ITV | 2013 |
| 4 September | The Cafe | Sky 1 | 2011 |
| 5 September | Britain and Ireland's Next Top Model | Sky Living | 2005 |
| 6 September | Star Treatment | ITV | 2013 |
| 15 September | What Remains | BBC One | 2013 |
| 19 September | The Guilty | ITV | 2013 |
| 26 September | Chickens | Sky 1 | 2013 |
| 27 September | The IT Crowd | Channel 4 | 2006 |
| 27 September | David Attenborough's Rise of Animals: Triumph of the Vertebrates | BBC Two | 2013 |
| 28 September | I Love My Country | BBC One | 2013 |
| 28 September | Stepping Out | ITV | 2013 |
| 9 October | Whitechapel | ITV | 2009 |
| 10 October | Pat & Cabbage | ITV | 2013 |
| 27 October | By Any Means | BBC One | 2013 |
| 29 October | London Irish | Channel 4 | 2013 |
| 7 November | Truckers | BBC One | 2013 |
| 10 November | Ambassadors | BBC One | 2013 |
| 12 November | The Escape Artist | BBC One | 2013 |
| 13 November | Agatha Christie's Poirot | ITV | 1989 |
| 14 November | Breathless | ITV | 2013 |
| 24 November | Was It Something I Said? | Channel 4 | 2013 |
| 1 December | Prize Island | ITV | 2013 |
| 8 December | Britain and the Sea | BBC One | 2013 |
| 9 December | Snog, Marry, Avoid? | BBC Three | 2008 |
| 11 December | Misfits | E4 | 2009 |
| 13 December | Off the Beaten Track | ITV | 2013 |
| 13 December | Wild Burma: Nature's Lost Kingdom | BBC Two | 2013 |
| 16 December | Ripper Street | BBC One | 2012 |
| 18 December | Lucan | ITV | 2013 |
| 19 December | The Great Train Robbery | BBC One | 2013 |
| 19 December | Him & Her | BBC Three | 2010 |
| 20 December | Stand Up for the Week | Channel 4 | 2010 |
| 20 December | Show Me the Telly | ITV | 2013 |
| 22 December | Hebburn | BBC Two | 2012 |
| 22 December | The Sarah Millican Television Programme | BBC Two | 2012 |
| 23 December | Peter Andre: My Life | ITV2 | 2009 |
| 24 December | Ben & Holly's Little Kingdom | Channel 5 | 2008 or 2009 |
| 28 December | Death Comes to Pemberley | BBC One | 2013 |
| 29 December | Sunday Scoop | ITV | 2013 |
| 29 December | Sunday Side Up | ITV | 2013 |
| 29 December | Agatha Christie's Marple | ITV | 2004 |
| 29 December | Mad Dogs | Sky 1 | 2011 |
| 29 December | Cash in the Attic | BBC Two | 2002 |
| 31 December | Tudor Monastery Farm | BBC Two | 2013 |

== Deaths ==
| Date | Name | Age | Broadcast credibility |
|---|---|---|---|
| 1 January | Christopher Martin-Jenkins | 67 | Test Match Special commentator |
| 11 January | Robert Kee | 93 | Writer and broadcaster |
| 28 January | Bernard Horsfall | 82 | English-Scottish actor |
| 29 January | David Taylor | 78 | Veterinarian and television host |
| 15 February | Pat Derby | 70 | British-born American animal trainer for numerous television shows in the United States and animal rights activist |
| 17 February | Richard Briers | 79 | Narrator, actor, Voice actor (Marriage Lines, Roobarb, Noddy, The Good Life, Noah and Nelly in... SkylArk, Watership Down, Ever Decreasing Circles, Bob The Builder, Monarch of the Glen) |
| 17 February | Derek Batey | 84 | Television presenter and executive (Mr. and Mrs.) |
| 21 February | Raymond Cusick | 84 | BBC designer (designed the Daleks on Doctor Who) |
| 22 February | Bob Godfrey | 91 | Animator, director, narrator, Voice actor (Roobarb, Noah and Nelly in... SkylArk, Henry's Cat, Bunyip) |
| 11 March | Tony Gubba | 69 | Sports commentator (also known for his role as voiceover on Dancing on Ice) |
| 14 March | Norman Collier | 87 | Comedian |
| 16 March | Frank Thornton | 92 | Actor (Last of the Summer Wine, Are You Being Served?) |
| 20 March | Jack Stokes | 92 | Animator and director (The Beatles: Yellow Submarine, Roobarb) |
| 28 March | Richard Griffiths | 65 | Actor (Pie in the Sky, Harry Potter films) |
| 5 May | Nick Milligan | 51 | BSkyB executive |
| 16 May | Paul Shane | 72 | Actor (Hi-de-Hi!, You Rang, M'Lord?, Oh, Doctor Beeching) |
| 18 May | Arthur Malet | 85 | Actor (Mary Poppins, In the Heat of the Night, The Black Cauldron, Anastasia) |
| 21 May | Eddie Braben | 82 | Comedy scriptwriter (Morecambe and Wise) |
| 22 May | Richard Thorp | 81 | Actor (Emmerdale) aka Alan Turner |
| 27 May | Bill Pertwee | 86 | Actor (Dad's Army), author |
| 7 June | David Lyon | 72 | Actor (House of Cards) |
| 24 June | Mick Aston | 66 | Media personality and archaeologist (Time Team) |
| 4 July | Bernie Nolan | 52 | Singer and actress (Brookside, The Bill) aka Sheelagh Murphy |
| 7 July | Anna Wing | 98 | Actress (EastEnders) |
| 12 July | Alan Whicker | 87 | Journalist and broadcaster (Whicker's World) |
| 12 July | Paul Bhattacharjee | 53 | Actor (EastEnders) |
| 12 July | Ray Butt | 78 | Television producer and director (Only Fools and Horses) |
| 17 July | Briony McRoberts | 56 | Actress (Take the High Road) |
| 19 July | Mel Smith | 60 | Comedian (Alas Smith and Jones, Not the Nine O'Clock News) |
| 27 July | Jon Leyne | 55 | Reporter of BBC News, BBC News, BBC World News, Reporters |
| 14 August | Mick Deane | 61 | Sky News cameraman |
| 31 August | David Frost | 74 | Television presenter, journalist, comedian and writer (host of Breakfast with Frost, Through the Keyhole, That Was the Week That Was and The Frost Report) |
| 2 September | David Jacobs | 87 | Actor and broadcaster (Top of the Pops, Juke Box Jury, A Song for Europe, Come Dancing) |
| 18 October | Felix Dexter | 52 | Actor, writer and comedian |
| 25 October | Nigel Davenport | 85 | Stage, television and film actor (Chariots of Fire, The Treasure Seekers, A Man for All Seasons, Much Ado About Nothing, Howards' Way, Without a Clue) |
| 7 November | John Cole | 85 | Journalist and broadcaster, former BBC Political Editor |
| 18 November | Peter Cartwright | 78 | Actor (Emmerdale) aka George Postlethwaite |
| 19 November | Ray Gosling | 74 | Journalist and broadcaster |
| 27 November | Lewis Collins | 67 | Actor (The Professionals) |
| 2 December | Mary Riggans | 78 | Actress (Take the High Road, Balamory) aka Suzie Sweet |
| 21 December | David Coleman | 87 | BBC Sports commentator |
| 30 December | Geoffrey Wheeler | 83 | Broadcaster (Top of the Form, Songs of Praise) |
| 31 December | John Fortune | 74 | Comedian and satirist (Bremner, Bird and Fortune) |

== See also ==
- 2013 in British music
- 2013 in British radio
- 2013 in the United Kingdom
- List of British films of 2013
