= List of people from Winchester =

This article is a list of people from Winchester, a city in Hampshire, England.

== List ==
- James Adams, (1980-), Hampshire cricketer.
- William Adelin, (1103-1120), only legitimate son and heir of Henry I.
- Saint Æthelwold, (909-984), Bishop of Winchester.
- Bob Anderson (darts player), (1942-), former BDO World darts champion
- Arthur, Prince of Wales, (1486-1502), elder son of Henry VII who pre-deceased his father and therefore never reigned.
- Kevin Ashman, (1959-), World Quiz Champion and Egghead.
- Jon Boden, (1977-), folk musician, brought up in Winchester.
- Wayne Bridge (1980-), International and National footballer, brought up and went to school (Kings School).
- Andy Burrows, (1979-), Razorlight drummer.
- Jon Burton, (1969-), founder of Traveller's Tales
- Olli Caldwell, (2002-), racing driver.
- Alexa Chung, (1983-), model.
- Clive Clark, golfer
- Jamie Cumming, (1999-), goalkeeper for Chelsea.
- Julia Darling, (1956-2005), poet.
- Jack Dee, (1961-), comedian, lived in Winchester from an early age.
- Freeman Dyson, (1923-2020), physicist.
- Louisa Dundas, (1806–1895), writer
- George Ferguson, (1947-), architect.
- Colin Firth, (1960-), Academy Award winning actor.
- Philippa Forrester, (1968-), TV and radio presenter.
- Frederick "Dickie" Frost (1866-1939), early racing cyclist.
- Brian Froud, (1947-), fantasy artist.
- Chris Green, (1943-), railway manager who created Network SouthEast.
- James Heatly, Commonwealth and European Diver, was born in Winchester.
- Henry III, (1207-1272), King of England.
- Danny Ings, (1992-), Footballer for West Ham United and England
- Charles Jenkinson, 1st Earl of Liverpool, (1729-1809), statesman.
- Tommy Jessop, (1985-), actor.
- Will Jessop, writer and director.
- George Langdon (1818-1894), cricketer.
- John Latham FRS (1740–1837), medical doctor, naturalist and author
- Jon Leyne, (1958-), BBC foreign correspondent, only foreign journalist in Iran during the Green Revolution in 2009
- Licoricia of Winchester (d. 1277), Jewish businesswoman.
- John Lingard (1771-1851), Roman Catholic priest and historian.
- Gregory Macalister Mathews (1876–1949), ornithologist
- Tony Middleton, (1964-), cricketer.
- Terry Paine, (1939-), footballer.
- K.E. (Ken) Palmer, (1937-2024), cricketer and umpire, Somerset all-rounder who played one Test for England.
- Mark Perego, Wales international rugby union player
- Lucy Pinder, (1983-), model.
- Richard, Earl of Cornwall (1209-1272), younger brother of King Henry III., was Count of Poitou (from 1225 to 1243), Earl of Cornwall (from 1227) and German King (formally "King of the Romans", from 1257).
- Saskia Servini (2001-), trampoline gymnast
- Kathy Smallwood-Cook, (1960-), athlete and Olympic medallist.
- Saint Swithun, (c. 800-862), Bishop of Winchester.
- Chris T-T, (1974-), singer-songwriter.
- James Tomlinson, (1982-), Hampshire cricketer.
- Frank Turner, (1981-), singer-songwriter.
- Jake Wallis Simons, (1978-), journalist and novelist.
- Mary Warnock, Baroness Warnock, (1924-2019), philosopher and writer on existentialism.
- Peter White, (1947-), blind broadcaster and radio journalist.
- Edward Young, (1683-1765), poet.
