= 2013 in Scottish television =

This is a list of events in Scottish television from 2013.

== Events ==
=== January ===
- 11 January – STV is awarded local TV licences to provide evening broadcasts for Edinburgh and Glasgow.
- 14 January – BBC One Scotland begins broadcasting in high-definition.
- 30 January – South of Scotland MSP Joan McAlpine leads a debate in the Scottish Parliament highlighting concerns over local news coverage in the Borders region. The debate follows concerns expressed by Ofcom over the quality of Scottish news coverage offered by ITV Border, which merged with ITV Tyne Tees in 2009 and moved its news operations to Gateshead.

=== February ===
- 3 February – Deputy First Minister Nicola Sturgeon interviews Sidse Babett Knudsen, the star of Danish political television drama Borgen for Scotland Tonight ahead of a screening of the second series finale at the Edinburgh Filmhouse. The interview is broadcast by STV the following evening.
- 5 February – A conference in southern Scotland is announced for the summer to discuss news coverage of the region by ITV Border which was considered unsatisfactory. The event aims at involving broadcasters and politicians and to be hosted by Scottish Borders Chamber of Commerce.

=== March ===
- 19 March – It is reported that Channel 4 will screen a documentary The Murder Trial showing footage of the trial of Nat Fraser, who in 2012 was convicted of the murder of his estranged wife, Arlene.
- 26 March – The Gaelic language channel BBC Alba is given a more prominent position on Sky's electronic programming guide.

=== May ===
- 21 May – The BBC announces £5m worth of investment in new programming ahead of the 2014 independence referendum.

=== June ===
- 13 June – Comedian Rory Bremner presents Rory Goes to Holyrood, a one-off comedy programme for BBC Scotland that takes a satirical look at Scottish politics and the independence debate. The show was conceived as a way of injecting some comedy into a subject that has suffered from an absence of humour.
- 17 June – A report in The Scotsman claims that Scotland lost out on the chance to play host to the fantasy television series Game of Thrones because of a lack of studio facilities. The series was instead produced in Northern Ireland.

=== September ===
- 27 September – Prime Minister David Cameron confirms he will not have a television debate with Scottish First Minister Alex Salmond ahead of next year's referendum on Scottish independence.

=== November ===
- 20 November – At the Salford Media Festival in Manchester, Culture Secretary Fiona Hyslop says that an independent Scotland would have a new licence fee funded broadcaster based on the assets and staff of BBC Scotland.
- 13 November – announcement of transmission changes that were being carried out on Freeview to support separate broadcasts to the sub-region of ITV Border Scotland. The technical change allows new services to begin broadcasting in January 2014.
- 26 November – The Scottish Government publishes Scotland's Future, its white paper laying out the case for an independent Scotland, and the means through which this would be achieved. Among the proposals are plans to replace BBC Scotland with a Scottish Broadcasting Service, although the body would continue to have close ties with the BBC, including airing content such as Doctor Who and EastEnders.

=== December ===
- 18 December – Radio Today reports that five of the ten radio stations taken off air on Freeview during the evenings to make way for BBC Alba will return full-time to the platform thanks to an improvement in efficiency. Those restored are BBC Radio Scotland, BBC Radio 4, BBC Radio 4 Extra, BBC Radio 5 Live Sports Extra and BBC Asian Network, while BBC Radio 1, BBC Radio 2, BBC Radio 3, BBC Radio nan Gàidheal and BBC World Service remain unavailable while BBC Alba is broadcasting.
- 31 December – New impressions on this year's edition of Only an Excuse? include singer Susan Boyle, and a sketch in which Labour leader Johann Lamont debates Scottish independence with Alex Salmond.

== Debuts ==
=== BBC ===
- 10 March – Shetland on BBC One
- 13 June – Rory Goes to Holyrood on BBC Two
- 31 December – Two Doors Down on BBC One

== Television series ==
- Reporting Scotland (1968–1983; 1984–present)
- Sportscene (1975–present)
- Public Account (1976–present)
- The Beechgrove Garden (1978–present)
- Only an Excuse? (1993–2020)
- River City (2002–2026)
- The Adventure Show (2005–present)
- Trusadh (2008–present)
- STV Rugby (2009–2010; 2011–present)
- Gary: Tank Commander (2009–present)
- Sport Nation (2009–present)
- STV News at Six (2009–present)
- The Nightshift (2010–present)
- Scotland Tonight (2011–present)

== Ending this year ==
- Limmy's Show (2010–2013)

== Deaths ==
- 26 January – Lesley Fitz-Simons, 51, actress
- 12 August – Robert Trotter, 83, actor
- 2 December – Mary Riggans, 78, actress

== See also ==
- 2013 in Scotland
