= 2013 in Scotland =

- Centuries: 19th; 20th; 21st
- Decades: 1990s; 2000s; 2010s; 2020s
- See also: List of years in Scotland; Timeline of Scottish history 2013 in: The UK • England • Wales • Elsewhere; Scottish football: 2012–13 • 2013–14; 2013 in Scottish television

Events from the year 2013 in Scotland.

== Incumbents ==
- First Minister and Keeper of the Great Seal – Alex Salmond
- Secretary of State for Scotland – Michael Moore until 7 October; then Alistair Carmichael

=== Law officers ===
- Lord Advocate – Frank Mulholland
- Solicitor General for Scotland – Lesley Thomson
- Advocate General for Scotland – Lord Wallace of Tankerness

=== Judiciary ===
- Lord President of the Court of Session and Lord Justice General – Lord Gill
- Lord Justice Clerk – Lord Carloway
- Chairman of the Scottish Land Court – Lord McGhie

== Events ==
=== January ===
- 15 January – Former Celtic FC manager Gordon Strachan is confirmed as the new manager of the Scotland national football team.
- 19 January – Four people die in an avalanche at Glencoe.

=== February ===
- 7 February – Plans announced for a second Gaelic school in Glasgow to meet growing demand.
- 22 February – Cardinal Keith O'Brien, leader of the Catholic Church in Scotland, says he believes priests should be able to marry if they wish to do so.
- 25 February – Cardinal Keith O'Brien steps down as leader of the Catholic Church in Scotland, after being accused of inappropriate sexual behaviour towards priests dating back to the 1980s.
- 27 February
  - Archbishop of Glasgow Philip Tartaglia is appointed apostolic administrator of the Roman Catholic Archdiocese of St Andrews and Edinburgh following the resignation of Cardinal Keith O'Brien.
  - Dumfries and Galloway councillors approve plans for the Star of Caledonia public artwork intended to mark the Scotland-England border at Gretna.

=== March ===
- 15 March
  - McCluskey Report recommends legal press regulation in Scotland.
  - Cockenzie coal-fired power plant closes.
- 20 March – Peterhead is one of two preferred bidders in a £1,000,000,000 competition to encourage the development of carbon capture and storage technology.
- 21 March – The date of the Scottish independence referendum is officially announced as Thursday, 18 September 2014.
- 22 March – Snow and gales blast the West coast of Scotland, plunging about 20,000 homes into darkness.

=== April ===
- 1 April – Police Scotland, a single national police force created by the amalgamation of Scotland's eight police forces into one division, comes into effect. Likewise united are the eight Fire & Rescue services into the new Scottish Fire and Rescue Service.
- 8 April:
  - Around 300 people gather for an impromptu street party in Glasgow upon hearing the news of the death of former Conservative Prime Minister, Margaret Thatcher.
  - Bill Walker MSP expelled from SNP for allegedly not declaring allegations cited in his uncontested divorce proceedings during the MSP vetting process. Later in the year, he is convicted of multiple charges of domestic violence.
- 15 April – The Scottish Premier League fails to achieve the 11–1 majority required to agree a new 12-12-18 model for Scottish football after Ross County and St Mirren FC vote against the proposal.
- 29 April – The tobacco display ban in large shops comes into force.

=== May ===
- 14 May – Launch of Business for Scotland, a pro-independence network of business people campaigning for a "Yes" vote in the 2014 independence referendum.
- 16 May – UKIP leader Nigel Farage is heckled by angry protesters during a campaign visit to Edinburgh.
- 20 May – The Church of Scotland's ruling General Assembly votes to allow actively gay men and women to become ministers.
- 24 May – Yes Scotland announces that a total of 372,103 people have signed the Yes Declaration with sixteen months to go until the referendum on Scottish independence.

=== June ===
- 19 June – Hearts FC placed into administration and will start next season in the top flight with a 15-point deduction.
- 20 June – Aberdeen Donside by-election, held to elect a successor for Brian Adam, who died in April, is won by Mark McDonald of the Scottish National Party.
- 26 June – The new road bridge across the Firth of Forth is officially named the Queensferry Crossing.
- 27 June – The bill to give sixteen and seventeen-year-olds the right to vote in the Scottish independence referendum is passed by MSPs.
- 28 June – The Scottish Premier League and the Scottish Football League agree to merge to form the Scottish Professional Football League.

=== July ===
- 7 July – Andy Murray wins the Men's Singles in tennis at Wimbledon 2013 defeating Novak Djokovic of Serbia in straight sets. Murray is the first British man to win the title since Fred Perry in 1936, and the first Scotsman to win since Harold Mahony in 1896.

=== August ===
- 22 August – Yes Scotland is forced to close their computer systems after being hacked by "forces unknown". Police Scotland’s Digital Forensic Unit is investigating.
- 23 August – A Super Puma L2 helicopter crashes near Sumburgh Airport in the Shetland Islands, resulting in four fatalities. Operation of the helicopter model is globally suspended.

=== September ===
- 20 September – Former Member of the Scottish Parliament (MSP) Bill Walker sentenced to 12 months in prison for domestic violence.
- 27 September – UK Prime Minister David Cameron rejects an invitation for a head-to-head televised debate on Scottish independence with Scottish First Minister, Alex Salmond.

=== October ===
- 8 October – The Scottish Government announces that the loss-making Prestwick Airport in Glasgow is to be taken into public ownership.
- 23 October – Ineos announces that the petrochemical plant at Grangemouth is to close with the loss of about 800 jobs.

=== November ===
- 26 November – First Minister Alex Salmond launches the Scottish Government's White Paper setting out its vision for an independent Scotland.
- 29 November – A Glasgow police helicopter crashes into The Clutha Vaults pub, causing eight confirmed deaths and thirty-two injuries.

=== December ===
- 15 December – Andy Murray wins BBC Sports Personality of the Year 2013.

== Deaths ==
- 3 January – Jimmy Halliday, 85, leader of the Scottish National Party from 1956 to 1960, (born 1927)
- 26 January – Lesley Fitz-Simons, actress (born 1961)
- 8 February – Ian Lister, footballer (born 1948)
- 18 February – Elspet Gray, Scottish actress (born 1929)
- 23 February – Bruce Millan, 85, former Scottish Secretary and European Commissioner (born 1927)
- 31 March – Helena Carroll, Scottish-American actress (born 1928)
- 25 March – Brian Adam, politician and biochemist (born 1948)
- 15 May – Billy Raymond, Scottish-Australian television host (born 1938)
- 31 May – Frederic Lindsay, writer of crime fiction (born 1933)
- 9 June – Iain Banks, author (born 1954)
- 22 June – Peter Fraser, Baron Fraser of Carmyllie, Conservative MP (1979–87) for Angus (South then East) and advocate (born 1945)
- 12 August – David McLetchie Leader of Scottish Conservatives 1998–2005 and MSP 1999–2012 (born 1952)
- 16 August – John Ryden, footballer (born 1931)
- 2 November – Jack Alexander of The Alexander Brothers, folk singer (born 1935)
- 9 November – Helen Eadie, politician (born 1947)

== See also ==
- 2013 in England
- 2013 in Northern Ireland
- 2013 in Wales
