= 1927 in Scotland =

- Centuries: 18th; 19th; 20th; 21st
- Decades: 1900s; 1910s; 1920s; 1930s; 1940s
- See also: List of years in Scotland; Timeline of Scottish history 1927 in: The UK • Wales • Elsewhere; Scottish football: 1926–27 • 1927–28

Events from the year 1927 in Scotland.

== Incumbents ==
- Secretary of State for Scotland and Keeper of the Great Seal – Sir John Gilmour, Bt

=== Law officers ===
- Lord Advocate – William Watson
- Solicitor General for Scotland – Alexander Munro MacRobert

=== Judiciary ===
- Lord President of the Court of Session and Lord Justice General – Lord Clyde
- Lord Justice Clerk – Lord Alness
- Chairman of the Scottish Land Court – Lord St Vigeans

== Events ==
- 28–30 January – gale-force winds batter the British Isles, with a gust of 90 kn (100 mph; 170 km/h) recorded in Paisley and 23 killed.
- 23 March – Leith by-election: Liberals hold seat.
- 16 April – the Scottish Cup Final is broadcast live on radio for the first time. Celtic F.C. beat East Fife 3–1.
- 12 July – official opening in Glasgow of the new Kelvin Hall exhibition venue and George V Bridge.
- 14 July – the Scottish National War Memorial is opened at Edinburgh Castle (architect: Robert Lorimer).
- 26 September – David MacBrayne's paddle steamer Grenadier (1885) catches fire and sinks at her overnight mooring in Oban with the loss of three crew.
- October – a school of pilot whales runs aground in the bay between Bonar Bridge and Ardgay.
- Undated
  - The Gillespie, Kidd & Coia architectural practice in Glasgow assumes this name.
  - Glasgow University Scottish Nationalist Association formed.
  - The Church of Scotland introduces the Church Hymnary, revised edition.

== Births ==
- 24 January – Sir Patrick Macnaghten, 11th Baronet, clan chief (died 2007)
- 16 February – Pearse Hutchinson, poet, broadcaster and translator (died 2012 in Ireland)
- 23 February – Willie Ormond, international footballer and manager (died 1984)
- 27 February – Jimmy Halliday, Scottish National Party leader (died 2013)
- 5 March – Robert Lindsay, 29th Earl of Crawford, politician (died 2023)
- 5 April – Colin Young, film educator (died 2021)
- 6 April – Nancy Riach, swimmer (died at 1947 European Aquatics Championships in Monte Carlo)
- 12 April – Patrick Meehan, criminal, victim of a miscarriage of justice (died 1994 in Swansea)
- 23 June – Kenneth McKellar, tenor (died 2010)
- 29 June – Tom Fleming, actor, director, poet and broadcast commentator (died 2010)
- 2 July – James Mackay, Baron Mackay of Clashfern, Lord Chancellor of Great Britain
- 1 October – Sandy Gall, television journalist (born in Penang) (died 2025)
- 5 October – Bruce Millan, Labour Secretary of State for Scotland (died 2013)
- 7 October – R. D. Laing, psychiatrist (died 1989 in Saint-Tropez)
- 10 October – Thomas Wilson, composer (died 2001)
- 31 October – Charles Cameron, bizarre magician (died 2001)
- 7 November – Melissa Stribling, film and television actress (died 1992 in Watford)
- 27 November – Arnold Clark, businessman (died 2017)
- 24 December – John Glashan, born McGlashan, cartoonist (died 1999)
- Sir James Dunbar-Nasmith, conservation architect (died 2023)

== Deaths ==
- 16 January – Haldane Burgess historian, poet, novelist, violinist, linguist and socialist, a noted figure in Shetland's cultural history (born 1862)
- 16 March – Sir Henry Craik, 1st Baronet, civil servant, writer and Unionist politician (born 1846; died in London)
- 17 March – James Scott Skinner, dancing master, fiddler and composer (born 1843)
- 26 June – Thomas P. Marwick, architect (born 1854)
- 8 July – Charles Hay, 20th Earl of Erroll, soldier and Conservative politician (born 1852)
- 21 July – William Campbell, Lord Skerrington, judge (born 1855)
- September – John George Govan businessman and evangelist, founder of The Faith Mission in 1886 (born 1861)
- 10 November – James Thomson, City Engineer, City Architect and Housing Director of Dundee (born 1852)

== The arts ==
- 15 September – Green's Playhouse opens in Glasgow, the largest cinema in Europe at this date.
- Joe Corrie's play In Time o' Strife, showing the effect of the General Strike on the Fife coal mining community, is first performed; and his The Image o' God and Other Poems is published.
- Royal Fine Art Commission for Scotland formed.

== See also ==
- Timeline of Scottish history
- 1927 in Northern Ireland
