= 2013 in England =

- Centuries: 19th; 20th; 21st
- Decades: 1990s; 2000s; 2010s; 2020s
- See also: 2012–13 in English football 2013–14 in English football 2013 in the United Kingdom; Other events of 2013

Events from 2013 in England

== Incumbent ==
- Monarch - Elizabeth II
- Prime Minister - David Cameron

== Events ==
=== January ===
- 3 January – The Met Office reports that 2012 was the wettest year on record for England.
- 4 January – Mark Cahill, a 51-year-old former pub landlord from West Yorkshire becomes the first person in the UK to receive a hand transplant.
- 10 January – April Casburn, a senior detective with the Metropolitan Police is found guilty of trying to sell information on the investigation into phone hacking to the News of the World, the newspaper at the centre of the scandal.
- 16 January – A helicopter crash in central London kills two people and injures 13 others.
- 22 January – A death sentence handed to British citizen Lindsay Sandiford by an Indonesian court for drug smuggling is condemned by the UK government.
- 30 January – Tony McCluskie is found guilty of the March 2012 murder of his sister, the actress Gemma McCluskie and jailed for life with a recommendation he serve a minimum term of 20 years.

=== February ===
- 1 February – Metropolitan Police detective April Casburn is jailed for fifteen months.
- 4 February – Former government Minister Chris Huhne pleads guilty to perverting the course of justice over claims he caused his ex-wife to accept speeding points he had incurred. He also announces his intention to resign his House of Commons seat.
- 5 February – The House of Commons votes 400 to 175 in favour of a vote on the bill to legalise gay marriage in England and Wales.
- 7 February – Secretary of State for Education Michael Gove confirms that plans to replace the General Certificate of Secondary Education with a new English Baccalaureate qualification have been abandoned.
- 28 February – The Eastleigh by-election, which was triggered by the resignation of Chris Huhne, sees the Liberal Democrats hold the seat despite a UKIP surge that pushes the Conservatives into third place.

=== March ===
- 14 March – Labour Party peer Lord Ahmed is suspended from the party after claiming a conspiracy by Jewish-owned media organisations was responsible for his imprisonment for dangerous driving.
- 26 March – A 14-year-old girl is found dead by police at a house in the Atherton area of Greater Manchester, where four "out of control" dogs are subsequently put down. Police have not confirmed the cause of death, but say her injuries are consistent with those of a dog attack.

=== April ===
- 1 April – Government reforms of the NHS in England have come into force with GP-led groups taking control of local budgets and a new board, NHS England, now overseeing the day-to-day running of services.

=== May ===
- 22 May – Off duty British soldier Lee Rigby murdered by two Muslim converts in a terror attack in Woolwich, London.

=== July ===
- 12 July – The funeral of murdered fusilier Lee Rigby take place in Bury, attendees include Prime Minister David Cameron.

=== November ===
- 21 November – Former non-executive chairman of the Co-operative Bank Paul Flowers is arrested by police in with a drugs supply investigation, having been exposed agreeing to buy cocaine and methamphetamine by the Mail on Sunday newspaper. Flowers is also suspended from the Labour Party and Methodist Church as a result of the allegations.

== Deaths ==
- 1 January – Christopher Martin-Jenkins, Cricket journalist (Test Match Special) (born 1945)
- 12 February – Keith Clayton, geographer and environmental scientist (born 1928)
- 8 April – Margaret Thatcher, prime minister of the United Kingdom (1979–1990) (born 1925)
- 29 June – Jean Kent, actress (born 1921)

== See also ==
- 2013 in Northern Ireland
- 2013 in Scotland
- 2013 in Wales
