= The Call Centre =

British television documentary

- Genre: Documentary
- No. of series: 2
- No. of specials: 1

Original release
- Network: BBC Three
- Release: 2013 – 2014

The Call Centre is a BBC fly-on-the-wall documentary following staff at the call centre of a Welsh company called Save Britain Money. Although now in administration, at the time of filming the call centre was described as Swansea's third-largest. Two series and a Christmas special aired on BBC Three, totalling 12 episodes, beginning in 2013 and concluding in 2014.

The call centre was officially named Save Britain Money and it was based in Swansea's Enterprise Zone. It employed approximately 600 staff was owned by Bhupinder Sidhu and was run by Neville (Nev) Wilshire. Wilshire famously opened the working day with a mass sing-along, and claimed he'd previously sacked two people for not participating. In 2013, it received a considerable fine of £225,000 for breaching regulations on cold calling by failing to run their database past the Telephone Preference Service (TPS), an opt-in service that supposedly stops marketing calls. In order to bypass these regulations on marketing calls, Wilshire set up an Indian call centre, which is outside the scope of British regulators. This was documented in a 2016 spin-off show for Watch called Nev's Indian Call Centre and saw staff from The Call Centre rejoin the cast.

A break-out star amongst the staff was tea-lady Hayley Pearce. Pearce went on to pose for Zoo magazine and had a breast augmentation. She later opened a cafe (which she shut within a year), moved to and worked in India for Nev's Indian Call Centre and then returned to the UK and began presenting a number of shows for BBC. In 2016, she presented a show on 'tanorexia' – an over-reliance on fake tan. In late 2016, a three part show called Hayley was released online on BBC Three, before airing on BBC One in January 2017. The show looked at issues facing young people, including cosmetic surgery, boozy holidays and dating apps. A second series aired in early 2018 and examined tattoo culture, body-shaming and the slimming industry. Pearce presented the six-part BBC show Hayley Goes in mid-2019. A six-episode second series aired in mid-2020.

Nev died in December 2021.
