= Face the Clock =

- Genre: Game show
- Created by: Paul Gilheany
- Directed by: Jeanette Goulbourn
- Presented by: Rory Bremner
- Theme music composer: Marc Sylvan
- Country of origin: United Kingdom
- Original language: English
- No. of series: 1
- No. of episodes: 35

Production
- Executive producer: Paul Murray
- Producer: Debi Roach
- Editor: Paul Griffiths Davies
- Camera setup: Multiple-camera setup
- Running time: 30mins (inc. adverts)
- Production company: Objective Scotland

Original release
- Network: Channel 4
- Release: 7 January – 22 February 2013

Face the Clock is a game show that was broadcast on Channel 4 from 7 January to 22 February 2013, and was hosted by Rory Bremner. On each episode, six contestants compete to build up a cash prize and eliminate one another in a series of timed rounds until one is left to play for the money. Contestants are not aware of how long each round will last.

== Gameplay ==
The podiums for Bremner and the six contestants are arranged in a circle similar to a clock, with Bremner facing the group across the centre.

=== Rounds 1 to 4 ===
Seven lights begin to flash on the front of the host's podium, one at a time in random order. One contestant, chosen by drawing lots before the show, presses the buzzer on their podium to stop the light at the beginning of Round 1. Each of the lights is secretly assigned to a different length of time ranging from 30 seconds to two minutes and 30 seconds, but no one in the studio is told what time has been selected. It is shown on-screen for the home viewer's benefit, however.

The host begins to ask questions, starting with the player who won the draw, as the clock begins to run. The first correct answer given on a turn is worth £50 to that player; the value increases by this amount for each of the next three consecutive correct answers, then rises to £300 for the fifth and beyond. A correct answer allows the contestant in control to either take another question or pass to the opponent of their choice, but a miss requires them to answer another question. An incorrect answer or pass resets the question value to £50. A sound effect is played after every 30 seconds.

When time runs out, the studio lights flash and the host announces the time for that round, which is then removed from play. The contestant in control at this point is eliminated from the game with no winnings. The opponent who passed to this contestant, if any, receives all of their accumulated money. If the eliminated contestant had kept control for the entire round, their money is forfeited.

Rounds 2 through 4 are played in the same manner, with the lowest scorer from the previous round setting the time for the next one and having initial control. In case of a tie for low score, the contestant closer to the host's left has priority.

=== Round 5: Face-Off ===
The two remaining contestants are given separate clocks, each set to 60 seconds. Only one clock runs at a time, starting with the low scorer, as the host begins to ask questions with no monetary value. The contestant in control must answer a question correctly in order to stop their clock and turn control over to the opponent. When one contestant's clock runs out, they are eliminated and their money is transferred to the opponent.

=== Final ===
The last contestant must answer five questions correctly within 60 seconds in order to win any money, and may pass or miss as often as needed. Doing so within 30 seconds awards the full jackpot, but each additional 10 seconds or portion thereof cuts it in half, with the value rounded up to the next highest multiple of £5 if necessary. If the contestant fails to give five correct answers before time runs out, they leave with nothing.

== International versions ==
Country	Title	Broadcaster(s)	Presenter(s)	Premiere	Finale
Vietnam	Đối mặt thời gian	HTV7	Đại Nghĩa	19 March 2010	26 February 2021

The Vietnamese version of the show is called Đối mặt thời gian (Facing Time) and is hosted by Đại Nghĩa, aired on HTV7 for two seasons from 19 March 2019 to 26 February 2021.

Each episode runs 60 minutes, with slightly different rules. Ten contestants compete, divided into two groups of five each. Within each group, the five contestants compete in four timed rounds until only one is left. The winners of the two halves compete in the Face-Off round, with the victor playing the final for the total money accumulated by both. A consolation cash prize of ₫5,000,000 is received if time runs out in the final round with at least three right answers, or if the victor wins the round with less than ₫5,000,000 at stake. All ten contestants receive a smartphone as a gift regardless of winning the game or not.
