= Enlighten Up! =

- Nick Rosen stars in the documentary.
- Directed by: Kate Churchill
- Written by: Kate Churchill, Jonathan Hexner
- Produced by: Kate Churchill
- Production company: Balcony Releasing
- Release date: 2009
- Running time: 82 minutes
- Language: English

Enlighten Up! is a 2009 documentary film by Kate Churchill on yoga as exercise. It follows an unemployed journalist for six months as, on the filmmaker's invitation, he travels from the US to India to practise under yoga masters including Pattabhi Jois, his first American pupil Norman Allen, and B. K. S. Iyengar.

== Film ==
=== Synopsis ===
Enlighten Up! follows a 29-year-old unemployed journalist, Nick Rosen, for six months as, on Kate Churchill's invitation, he travels the globe – New York, Boulder, California, Hawaii, India – to practise under yoga masters including Pattabhi Jois, his first American pupil Norman Allen, and B. K. S. Iyengar to see if he will be converted. However, he remains pragmatic and skeptical throughout his varied experiences.

=== Cast ===
Starring Nick Rosen, with appearances by yoga gurus and teachers, as themselves:

- B. K. S. Iyengar
- Pattabhi Jois
- Norman Allen
- Sharon Gannon
- David Life
- Gurmukh Kaur Khalsa
- Dharma Mittra
- Cyndi Lee
- Alan Finger
- Rodney Yee
- Beryl Bender Birch

== Reception ==
The film critic Roger Ebert found Enlighten Up! interesting and peaceful, if "not terribly eventful, but I suppose we wouldn't want a yoga thriller". He commented: "I'm glad I saw it. I enjoyed all the people I met during Nick's six-month quest. Most seemed cheerful and outgoing, and exuded good health. They smiled a lot. They weren't creepy true believers obsessed with converting everyone."

Nathan Lee, writing in The New York Times, calls Churchill's approach a "shrewd idea", choosing a yoga novice rather than her own experience as the film's focus. In Lee's view, Rosen, "a physically fit, intellectually skeptical journalist from New York", both enables the viewer "to explore yoga through a surrogate, and it marginalizes Ms. Churchill's blatant agenda and rather grating personality." Rosen finds yoga a good workout but retains "an open mind and a dubious eye for [yoga's] more metaphysical trappings." Lee writes that the film lives up to the promise of its title, providing "a light touch and welcome sense of humor." He concludes that the "lack of resolution about yoga’s ultimate goal suggests that Mr. Rosen wasn’t the only one to gain some self-knowledge along the way."

Joseph Jon Lanthier, writing for Slant magazine, states that he presumes the film's audience is skeptics of yoga and of "guruism in general". He notes that the director, Churchill, appears throughout the film, "hardly shy about her own reservations with yoga" despite years of practice, while Rosen's pragmatic worldview "springs from friction between his practical, legal counselor father and his spacey, New Age mother". Lanthier notes that Allen and Iyengar do not try to argue with agnosticism: they propose only that yoga is one of many paths to self-fulfillment, which in Lanthier's view undermines the film's premise. All the same, he finds that the film "examines the astounding diversity and confused historical background of its subject quite well."

Walter Addiego, writing on SFGate, calls the film "engaging" with its "breezy title". Describing Churchill as "a longtime yoga buff", he states that she chose Rosen, "a mellow type with a skeptical worldview and a resistance to spiritual oratory" "to test her beliefs". Rosen is however unwilling or unable to yield to any form of yoga, Addiego writes, but even though Rosen asserted that the filmed experiment failed, "his life changed in major ways after the pilgrimage."

Ronnie Scheib, writing on Variety, calls the film a "well-crafted pic[ture]" and a "simultaneously tongue-in-cheek and reverential docu[mentary that] will entertain the unenlightened without alienating the faithful." Scheib notes that as Rosen fails to respond to the yoga taught by any of the range of "benevolent sages to burning-eyed ascetics", Churchill "allows her angry disappointment to become a dramatic factor, her whispered asides attempting to steer Rosen's pragmatic queries down more metaphysical paths."
