= Louisa Dundas =

British novelist

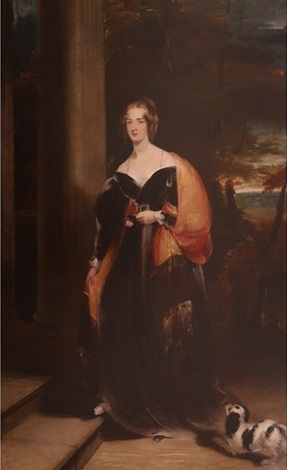
- portrait by Sir Francis Grant
- Born: 19 January 1806; Winchester
- Died: 6 September 1895 (aged 89); Stamford
- Occupation: Novelist
- Spouse(s): Charles Dundas

Louisa Maria Boothby Dundas (née Boothby, 19 January 1806 – 6 September 1895) was a British author who published under the name the Hon. Mrs. Dundas.

== Life ==
Louisa Boothby was born on 19 January 1806 in Winchester, the daughter of Sir William Boothby, 8th Baronet and Fanny Jenkinson.

In 1833, she married the Rev. Charles Dundas, son of Robert Dundas, 2nd Viscount Melville and Anne Dundas, Viscountess Melville.

Louisa Dundas published two books for children: The little cap : Or, The lost heir of Sternfelden (1871) and Wrecked, Not Lost: or, The Pilot and his Companions (1872).

Dundas died on 6 September 1895 in Stamford, Lincolnshire.

== Children ==
- Fanny Emma Dundas Reeve (d. 8 July 1892)
- Edith Anne Dundas Reeve (c. 1835–12 August 1902)
- Henry Dundas, 5th Viscount Melville (8 March 1835–3 November 1904)
- Gertrude Susan Dundas (b. c. 1838)
- Charles Saunders Melville Dundas, 6th Viscount Melville (27 June 1843–21 Sep 1926), diplomat
- Alice Caroline Dundas Jebb (20 May 1847–9 April 1924)
- William Walter Dundas (20 May 1847–3 February 1910), Lieutenant 5th Dragoon Guards
