= Frederick Frost (cyclist) =

British cyclist (1866–1939)

Personal information
- Nickname: Dickie
- Born: Frederick David Frost; January 1866 Winchester, England
- Died: October 1939 (aged 73) Winchester

Cycling career
- Sport: Cycling

Amateur team
- 1894-: Bath Road Club, Hayes

Major wins
- Cawardine Challenge Cup; Bath Road 100

Frederick "Dickie" Frost (1866–1939) was an English champion cyclist, who in 1898 won the three leading cycle races in the United Kingdom.

== Early life ==
Frederick David Frost was born in Winchester, England in January 1866. He was the only son of David Frost, who was a watchmaker and silversmith, and ran his own jewellery business in the centre of Winchester. Frost studied crafts and drafting at the Winchester School of Art, now part of the University of Southampton.

== Cycling career ==
Frost became interested in sport at a young age and was an all-round athlete. He won medals for running and swimming and was a prominent member of the Winchester Harriers sports club. He particularly excelled as a cyclist, entering competitive events at an early age and holding several amateur cycling records. In 1898, Frost won, within the space of a fortnight, Britain's two leading cycle racing trophies, the Bath Road 100 and the Cawardine Challenge Cup, as well as the national championship. By the time he retired he had won every important amateur cycling trophy in the nation.

He is particularly remembered for winning the Carwardine Challenge Cup, a 100-mile race held annually at the Herne Hill race track. This huge cup was donated by the vice-president of the Anerley Bicycle Club in 1895 and was made from 650 ounces of silver, with ornamentation of solid gold. The tradition at the time was that if someone won a trophy three times they could keep it. Frost, riding for the Bath Road club in Hayes, first won it in 1896, repeated the victory in 1898 and was victorious for the third time in 1900. The cup is occasionally exhibited in Winchester.

== Later life ==
After the death of his father, Frost took over the running of the family jewellery business. In his spare time, he devoted himself to encouraging sport in Winchester and the county of Hampshire, particularly amongst young people. He died in October 1939.
