= Britain and the Sea =

- Genre: Factual
- Written by: David Dimbleby
- Directed by: John Hodgson; Rosie Schellenberg; Graham Cooper
- Presented by: David Dimbleby
- Composers: Chris Nicolaides; Michael Doherty; Jon Chilton
- Country of origin: United Kingdom
- Original language: English
- No. of series: 1
- No. of episodes: 4 (list of episodes)

Production
- Executive producer: Basil Comely
- Producer: Alexander Leith
- Editor: Andrea Carnevali
- Camera setup: Mike Garner
- Running time: 60 minutes

Original release
- Network: BBC One; BBC One HD
- Release: 17 November – 8 December 2013

Britain and the Sea is a British documentary television series presented and written by David Dimbleby that was first broadcast on BBC One on 17 November 2013. The series was made in partnership with National Maritime Museum and explores Britain's maritime heritage.

== Production ==
Mark Bell, a BBC commissioning editor, announced the television series on 14 June 2012. One of the locations used for filming was the Falmouth Aquarium in Falmouth.

During the filming of the first episode, David Dimbleby got his first tattoo when looking into how the UK was introduced to body art. He got the tattoo when he was aged 75 and the scorpion tattoo is located on his shoulder. Toby Young of The Daily Telegraph called it a publicity stunt and The Guardian's Jonathan Freedland called the tattoo "a sign of things to come".

== Episode list ==
No.	Title	Directed by	Original release date	UK viewers (millions)
1	"Adventure and Exploration"	John Hodgson	17 November 2013	2.71 (overnight)
Route: Helford – Dartmouth Points of interest: Falmouth, Newton Ferrers church and Buckland Abbey
2	"Invasion and Defence"	Rosie Schellenberg	24 November 2013	N/A
Route: Lymington – Dover Points of interest: HMNB Portsmouth and Southsea Castle
3	"Trade and Romance"	Graham Cooper	1 December 2013	N/A
Route: Craobh Haven – Glasgow Points of interest: Crinan Canal, Scottish Highlands, Tarbert and Mount Stuart House
4	"Pleasure and Escape"	Alexander Leith	8 December 2013	N/A
Route: Gorleston – London Points of interest: Lowestoft, Aldeburgh, Frinton-on-Sea and Greenwich

== Reception ==
=== Ratings ===
Overnight figures showed that the first episode was watched by 10.1% of the viewing audience for that time, with 2.71 million watching it.

=== Critical reception ===
Neil Midgley of The Daily Telegraph gave the first episode two stars out of five and said:

Dimbleby couldn't save a first episode that had no clear idea of what it wanted to achieve – and several very bad ideas about how to achieve it. As Dimbleby sailed from port to port, he sprinkled in a few little educational films, which were presumably supposed to be the meat of the programme. But their remit was so diffuse – history, art, culture, whatever, oh yes, the sea, don’t forget the sea – that this was where the programme really lost its grip.

The Guardian's Sam Wollaston said it was Five Go Down to the Sea, "with a bit of history, culture, art (JM Turner, D Dimbleby etc, plus body art of course) thrown in. Rather nice." Matthew Baylis of the Daily Express commented on the large publicity regarding Dimbleby's tattoo, saying:

I fear that the first episode of Britain and the Sea was drowned out by news that its presenter had had a scorpion tattooed on his shoulder during its filming. There were more interesting things to see as the headmasterly Dimbleby circumnavigated our isles in his lovingly tended 28ft sailing boat Rocket.

Andrew Billen, a journalist writing for The Times said: "The contrast between the grizzled sea dog and his fresh-faced shipmates deepened the Enid Blytonish tone of their sail around Cornwall and Devon with shades of Captain Birdseye... It was an inclusive and multidisciplinary tour, deft enough to make Coast look ponderous." Time Out gave the first two episodes two out of five stars and said the second episode lacked the number of surprises the first episode had.
