= Bremner, Bird and Fortune =

- Bremner, Bird & Fortune title card
- Created by: Rory Bremner; John Bird; John Fortune
- Starring: Rory Bremner; John Bird; John Fortune; Pauline McLynn; Frances Barber
- Country of origin: United Kingdom
- Original language: English
- No. of series: 19 (7 as Rory Bremner...Who Else?, 12 as Bremner, Bird and Fortune)
- No. of episodes: 158 (62 as Rory Bremner...Who Else?, 96 as Bremner, Bird and Fortune)

Production
- Running time: 60 minutes (including Television advertisements)
- Production company: Vera Productions

Original release
- Network: Channel 4
- Release: 9 October 1993 – 4 May 2010

Bremner, Bird and Fortune, originally titled Rory Bremner...Who Else?, is a satirical British television programme produced by Vera Productions for Channel 4, uniting comedy impressionist Rory Bremner with the veteran satirical comedy duo John Bird and John Fortune (known as "The Two Johns"). From 1993 to 2008 the show ran for 19 series, followed by several one-off episodes until 2010.

== History ==
=== 1986–1992: Now Something Else / The Rory Bremner Show ===
Rory Bremner's first television series, Now Something Else, started in 1986 on BBC2 and ran for seven series, with the title changed to The Rory Bremner Show from the fourth series onwards. The BBC gave him his own television series after successful shows at the Edinburgh festival. The series also had input from Jeremy Hardy, Steve Nallon, Steve Brown, Enn Reitel, Jim Sweeney and Steve Steen. In 1989 John Bird started to contribute to the show, as did John Fortune starting in 1991.

=== 1993–1998: Rory Bremner...Who Else? ===
In 1993 Bremner moved to Channel 4. His new show, Rory Bremner...Who Else?, featured Bird and Fortune prominently, and over the seven series the show developed into a more hard-edged, satirical and political show, with sketches satirising subjects such as The Jerry Springer Show, Ainsley Harriott and sporting personalities being reduced.

=== 1999–2010: Bremner, Bird and Fortune ===
By 1999 all non-political sketches were dropped and the show was refocused purely on political satire, with a name change.

In 2002 three members of the show's production team, Geoff Atkinson, Steve Connelly and Tristam Shapeero, were nominated for a BAFTA for Best Comedy Programme or Series. Bird and Fortune were nominated for a BAFTA for Best Entertainment Performance in 2001 and Best Comedy Performance in 2002. They did not win, however.

In 2003, the 2002 one-off special At Her Majesty's Pleasure won a Broadcasting Press Guild Award for Best Entertainment.

In October 2004, Bremner, Bird and Fortune published a book based on the show, called You Are Here: A Dossier (Weidenfeld & Nicolson, 288 pages, ISBN 0-297-84778-3, also available as a paperback from Orion mass market paperback, ISBN 0-7528-6493-9). In 2004 Rory Bremner was nominated for a BAFTA for Best Comedy Performance.

In November 2008 a four-part miniseries was produced called Silly Money. The trio looked at the economic downturn, with fewer of the usual sketches and co-stars. The episodes contained many more George Parr sketches than usual (the standard being one per episode). They also included a number of archive clips to further illustrate points and create satire from them based on hindsight.

The last full series was broadcast in late 2008. Two further miniseries, both having three episodes, focussed more on specific issues. The Last Show Before The Recovery started on 7 June 2009 and looked at the banking crisis, while The Daily Wind-Up, aired from 2–4 May 2010, focused on the 2010 United Kingdom general election. The Daily-Wind Up were the last three episodes of Bremner, Bird and Fortune.

== Regular features ==
For most of its run, the show was almost entirely political, but in the later series different genres of sketches were introduced. The programme featured regular stand-up impressionism sections by Bremner. Another feature was interviews between Bird and Fortune, alternating each episode between interviewer and interviewee, with the interviewee usually being a man in a government position or a businessman, almost always named George Parr, who ended up exposing the idiocies of his area of expertise. There were also heavily researched, bitingly satirical three-handed historical narratives; the dinner party sketches, featuring Bird, Fortune, Pauline McLynn and Frances Barber; and other small sketches. Each episode ended with a (usually political) musical number.

== Episodes ==
=== Now Something Else / The Rory Bremner Show ===
- Series 1 (Now Something Else): 5 Episodes (3 March - 7 April 1986)
- Series 2 (Now Something Else): 5 Episodes (3 April - 8 May 1987)
- Series 3 (Now Something Else): 6 Episodes (5 May - 2 June 1988)
- Series 4 (The Rory Bremner Show): 6 Episodes (31 March - 5 May 1989)
- Series 5 (The Rory Bremner Show): 6 Episodes (20 May - 25 June 1990)
- Series 6 (The Rory Bremner Show): 6 Episodes (15 March - 19 April 1991)
- Series 7 (The Rory Bremner Show): 6 Episodes (8 May - 12 June 1992)

40 episodes in total

=== Rory Bremner...Who Else? ===
- Series 1: 9 Episodes (9 October - 4 December 1993)
- Series 2: 10 Episodes (8 October - 10 December 1994)
- Series 3: 8 Episodes (7 October - 25 November 1995)
- Series 4: 8 Episodes (5 April - 24 May 1996)
- Series 5: 10 Episodes (27 September - 29 November 1996)
- Bremner, Bird and Fortune: Three Men and a Vote two-part special (26 April and 3 May 1997)
- Series 6: 7 Episodes (24 October - 12 December 1997)
- Series 7: 8 Episodes (11 October - 6 December 1998)

62 episodes in total

=== Bremner, Bird and Fortune ===
- Series 1: 8 Episodes (17 October - 5 December 1999)
- Bremner, Bird, Fortune, Delia, Des...There one-off special (3 January 2000)
- Series 2: 6 Episodes (4 March - 8 April 2001)
- Bremner, Bird and Fortune's Exit Pole one-off special (10 June 2001)
- Geoffrey Mallet: A Hero of Our Times one-off special (31 December 2001)
- Series 3: 7 Episodes (27 January - 10 March 2002)
- At Her Majesty's Pleasure one-off special (2 June 2002)
- Between Iraq and a Hard Place one-off special (5 January 2003)
- Series 4: 7 Episodes (19 January - 2 March 2003)
- Beyond Iraq and a Hard Place one-off special (11 May 2003)
- Trust Me, I'm a Prime Minister one-off special (20 November 2003)
- Series 5: 7 Episodes (1 February - 7 March 2004)
- Series 6: 5 Episodes (26 September - 31 October 2004)
- Series 7: 6 Episodes (6 March - 10 April 2005)
- A Bunch of Counts one-off special (5 May 2005)
- Series 8: 5 Episodes (11 September - 16 October 2005)
- Series 9: 6 Episodes (4 March - 8 April 2006)
- One-off special (23 September 2006)
- Series 10: 6 Episodes (3 March - 7 April 2007)
- Tony Blair: My Part in His Downfall documentary (25 June 2007)
- Series 11: 6 Episodes (30 September - 4 November 2007)
- Series 12: 7 Episodes (13 April - 25 May 2008)
- Silly Money four-part special (2 - 18 November 2008)
- The Last Show Before the Recovery one-off special (7 June 2009)
- Who Broke Britain? one-off special (14 June 2009)
- Happy Days Are Here Again one-off special (21 June 2009)
- The Daily Wind-Up three-part special (2 - 4 May 2010)

96 episodes in total

== Books ==
- The Long Johns by John Bird and John Fortune (published 3 October 1996 by Hutchinson/Channel 4)
- You Are Here: A Dossier by Rory Bremner, John Bird and John Fortune (published 28 October 2004 by Weidenfeld & Nicolson)
