= Supermarket Secrets =

British television series

- Genre: Factual
- Developed by: Ros Homan
- Directed by: Tom Watt-Smith; Matthew Ainsworth
- Presented by: Gregg Wallace; Nikki Fox
- Country of origin: United Kingdom
- Original language: English
- No. of series: 3
- No. of episodes: 10 (list of episodes)

Production
- Executive producer: Marcus Herbert
- Producers: Paul Overton; Matthew Ainsworth
- Running time: 60 minutes

Original release
- Network: BBC One; BBC One HD
- Release: 4 July 2013 – 24 April 2019

Supermarket Secrets is a British documentary television series, presented by Gregg Wallace, that first broadcast on BBC One on 4 July 2013. The series shows how British supermarkets make and move the food they sell. A new series started in 2019

== Series overview ==
Series	Episodes	Originally released	
Series	Episodes	First released	Last released
1	4	4 July 2013	3 April 2014
2	3	19 June 2017	10 July 2017
3	3	10 April 2019	24 April 2019

== Episode list ==
=== Series 1 ===
No. overall	No. in series	Title	Directed by	Original release date	UK viewers (millions)
1	1	"Summer's Supermarket Secrets"	Tom Watt-Smith	4 July 2013	3.91
2	2	"Autumn's Supermarket Secrets"	Matt Ainsworth	30 October 2013	3.94
3	3	"Christmas Supermarket Secrets"	Tom Watt-Smith	12 December 2013	4.28
4	4	"Spring's Supermarket Secrets"	Matt Ainsworth	3 April 2014	TBA

=== Series 2 ===
No. overall	No. in series	Title	Directed by	Original release date	UK viewers (millions)
5	1	"War"	Laura Blount	19 June 2017	TBA
6	2	"Health"	Unknown	26 June 2017	TBA
7	3	"Convenience"	Unknown	10 July 2017	TBA

=== Series 3 ===
No. overall	No. in series	Title	Directed by	Original release date	UK viewers (millions)
8	1	"Staying on Trend"	Unknown	10 April 2019	TBA
9	2	"On Demand"	Unknown	17 April 2019	TBA
10	3	"Loyalty"	Unknown	24 April 2019	TBA

== Reception ==
=== Ratings ===
Overnight figures showed that the first episode on 4 July 2013 was watched by 18.7% of the viewing audience for that time, with 3.75 million watching it. Official ratings raised that figure to 3.91 million. The episode was below the BBC's slot average of 3.93 million people. There was an increase in audience from its first five minutes to last five minutes. The first five minutes had 2.86 million viewers (14.52% audience share) and its last five minutes had 4.46 million viewers (22.53% audience share). The second episode on 30 October 2013 was watched by 17.0% of the viewing audience, with 3.76 million viewers according to overnight figures. The penultimate episode had an 18.5% audience share, with overnight figures estimating the viewing figure to be 4.01 million.

=== Critical reception ===
==== Summer's Supermarket Secrets ====
Rachel Ward of The Daily Telegraph gave the episode three out of five stars and said "the programme delivered little in the way of shocking, revealing or dirty secrets". The Guardian's Lucy Mangan said: "Summer's Supermarket Secrets was essentially one of those filmed-in-a-factory Sesame Street segments extended and presented by Animal." The Daily Express listed it as one of their picks of the day. Tom Sutcliffe, writing for The Independent, said: "It was an infuriatingly interesting programme this. Infuriating because you might have hoped for a slightly more questioning attitude to such powerful operators in our daily lives." Express & Star journalist Robert Taylor said:

And really, we shouldn't be surprised that this show managed to sputter into life given the recent trend of PR schemes masquerading as television programmes. It's just that in many ways Supermarket Secrets is even more egregious than Sky 1's Greggs: More Than Meats the Pie. At least that show doesn't gussy itself up like a consumer advice documentary. In fact, much of the show felt directly lifted from a corporate pamphlet.

==== Autumn's Supermarket Secrets ====
The Guardian's John Crace said Gregg Wallace

failed to ask supermarkets tricky questions about profits, packaging, ethics, food miles, waste, battery chickens. ... Far from revealing any secrets, the story in which Wallace seemed most interested was just what an amazing job the supermarkets were doing to bring us all the different foods and household products we wanted. Over on the commercial channels, supermarkets have to pay for adverts like this. The closest to criticism that Wallace got was to make a few lame jokes. ... There are any number of secrets that a half-awake presenter might have wanted to prise out of the supermarkets.

Claire Winter of Time Out gave the episode three out of five stars and said: "Supermarket Secrets is packed with good-to-know information, but can’t quite overcome a base blandness that lacks the kick to make it more than just good for our health." The Times also gave the episode three out of five stars. The Independent nominated the episode as one of their television choices of the day.
