= The Common Denominator =

2013 British game show

- Genre: Game show
- Presented by: Phil Spencer
- Theme music composer: Marc Sylvan
- Country of origin: United Kingdom
- Original language: English
- No. of series: 1
- No. of episodes: 40

Production
- Running time: 30 minutes (inc. adverts)
- Production company: Remarkable Television

Original release
- Network: Channel 4
- Release: 18 February – 19 April 2013

The Common Denominator is a quiz show that aired on Channel 4 from 18 February 2013 to 19 April 2013. The programme was hosted by Phil Spencer.

== Format ==
Contestants were given two phrases, and must state the single word that links the phrases together. For example, the two phrases could be "Wikipedia" and "The United Kingdom", with the link in this case being "Wales"; Jimbo Wales founded Wikipedia, and Wales is a country in the United Kingdom.

== Rules ==
Each episode featured three players, one of which would be eliminated after each round. In each question, the clock would start to count down right when the two elements appeared and players may give as many answers as they could within the time limit until a correct one was given or time expired.

=== Round 1 ===
Each player was given four pairs of two words each. They would have 10 seconds to find the link between each pair to score a point. The two highest scorers at the end of the round would move on to the next round.

=== Round 2 ===
The two remaining players would compete in four pairs of two pictures each. The higher scorer at the end of Round 1 would take the first turn in the first link, and players would switch precedence every new question.

On each pair, the contestant in control would have 10 seconds to guess the link, after which control would switch to their opponent if needed, who would also be given 10 seconds. Whoever gave the correct response first would score a point. The player with more points at the end would advance to the Final.

=== Final ===
The champion was given 45 seconds to solve six pairs of a picture and a word each. Giving the correct link would earn them the amount behind it. Values would increase throughout pairs and were not cumulative.

Pair	Prize
6	£10,000
5	£2,500
4	£1,000
3	£500
2	£250
1	£100

The clock would pause after each right answer, at which the player was given the choice to either stop the game and take the prize money, or risk it on the next pair. Running out of time on any pair would cost them their entire winnings.
