= Sky Movies 007 HD =

UK subscription television movie channel

- Country: United Kingdom, Ireland

Programming
- Picture format: (HDTV)

Ownership
- Owner: BSkyB

History
- Launched: 5 October 2012
- Closed: 17 August 2013

Sky Movies 007 HD was a premium subscription television movie channel in the United Kingdom and Ireland operated by BSkyB. The channel was dedicated to the James Bond films and first went on-air on 5 October 2012 after Sky secured the broadcasting rights to the back catalogue of Bond films, and to coincide with the 50th anniversary of the release of the first Bond film, Dr. No in 1962. After initially airing for a month to celebrate the anniversary the channel returned from 1 January 2013 to 21 January 2013, then again in February. Its last airdate was 17 August 2013. In November 2013, ITV re-acquired the franchise after signing a deal with the distributor, and the films returned to terrestrial television. On 8 July 2016 Sky Movies was rebranded as Sky Cinema. As part of the rebrand, Sky acquired the rights to show the latest James Bond film (Spectre).

== Background ==
On 12 April 2012 it was reported that BSkyB had signed a deal with MGM for exclusive rights to air the James Bond films in the United Kingdom, beginning from October to coincide with the 50th anniversary of the film franchise. The agreement meant the end of ITV's unbroken run as holder of the screen rights which began in 1975. Sky originally planned to air the films on Sky Movies Showcase, but in August 2012 announced it would create a specific channel dedicated to the Bond series. An advertisement for the channel together with a logo based on the James Bond logo was unveiled in September. The launch date of the channel, 5 October, was also confirmed.

Sky's deal with MGM expired in late 2013. ITV signed a deal with the distributor in November 2013 for the broadcasting rights to the films, which would enable it to air Skyfall in 2014. In December, Ireland's state broadcaster, RTÉ, signed a multi-million Euro deal to air the films on its network beginning from Christmas.

== Launch ==
To celebrate the launch of the channel, journalists from the entertainment website Digital Spy were invited to take part in a Bond movie marathon at London's Corinthia Hotel, where they would watch the twenty-two Bond films then on release back to back. The marathon began on Friday 28 September and ended on Sunday 30 September. Sky Movies 007 HD launched on Friday 5 October to coincide with the 50th anniversary of the release of Dr. No, the first film in the series. The channel was available on-air and on demand through Sky Digital, and was broadcast until Sunday 4 November. After that date the films continued to be available via the on-demand service Sky Anytime+, and aired on various Sky Movies channels. As well as the films the channel also aired Bond-related documentaries, such as behind-the-scenes footage and interviews with cast and crew members.

Speaking on 3 October 2012 ahead of the channel's launch, Ian Lewis, Director of Sky Movies said, "The Bond movies are a very special franchise and we want to ensure that our customers will be able to experience it in a way they’ve never been able to before, and so we’re going to create a dedicated channel SKY MOVIES 007 HD devoted entirely to James Bond showing the entire catalogue of films and loads of extra material." As part of a promotion for the channel, on 5 October 2012 the digital radio station Absolute Radio 00s changed its name to Absolute Radio 007 for the day.

Initially the channel was on air for a month, and closed on 5 November to make way for Sky Movies Christmas. When that channel closed, Sky Movies 007 HD was relaunched on 1 January 2013. To coincide with the channel's return Sky Movies commissioned a survey to find viewers' favourite scene from the Bond films, which were then shown in a special programme, Bond's Greatest Moments. A scene from Goldfinger in which Bond is strapped to a table as a laser beam begins to cut it in half was voted as the top moment by 10.3 percent of the 2,500 people polled. The channel closed for a second time on 21 January, but returned due to popular demand on 11 February when Sky Movies Showcase was rebranded as Sky Movies Oscars. Because of this, it moved to channel 310. It returned in the summer of 2013 and was available up until 17 August, when it was replaced with Sky Movies Superhero.

== Similar promotions ==
A similar promotion in October 2015 saw Sky Movies Greats temporarily renamed Sky Movies Harry Potter as Sky launched an early celebration of the fifteenth anniversary of the release of the film version of Harry Potter and the Philosopher's Stone. From 24 October the channel began a nine-day run of the Harry Potter film series, after which the films would also be available through Sky's on demand service for the next twelve months.
