= Jon Leyne =

BBC journalist (1958–2013)

Jon Leyne (28 February 1958 – 27 July 2013) was the Cairo correspondent for BBC News and its 24-hour television news channels BBC World News and BBC News, as well as the BBC's domestic television and radio channels and the BBC World Service. He worked for the BBC for nearly 30 years, and was its correspondent in New York and Washington, followed by Amman in Jordan and Tehran in Iran. He became the BBC's Cairo correspondent in June 2010.

== Education ==
Leyne was educated at Winchester College, followed by the University of Exeter and St Antony's College, Oxford, where he studied an MPhil in the international response to terrorism.

== Life and career ==
Leyne joined the BBC in 1985, and provided commentary on the British rowing success at the 1992 Barcelona Olympics and the Oxford and Cambridge Boat Race. From 1992 to 1994, he was the BBC's United Nations Correspondent in New York. From 1994 to 2001, he worked around Europe and the Middle East, including Belfast, Kosovo, Baghdad and Basra.

In June 2001, Leyne became the BBC's State Department correspondent, based in Washington, D.C. and was less than a mile from the Pentagon when it was hit on 11 September. Whilst at the State Department, he travelled throughout the world, including trips with Colin Powell, the-then US Secretary of State, to Afghanistan, India, Pakistan, Nepal and Israel. In July 2004, he was appointed the BBC's Amman correspondent, during which time he reported from Lebanon and Syria during the 2006 conflict between Israel and Lebanese militant group, Hezbollah. He later became Tehran correspondent, in which he was reportedly expelled, and the BBC's Persian television service was disrupted by "deliberate interference" from inside Iran in the days following the 12 June election.

He reported on the intifada in the Palestinian Territories, from Tunisia on the uprisings and personally witnessed a Palestinian militant attack on two Israeli soldiers in Ramallah which stalled the peace process and was in Libya to report on the 2011 civil war and the fall of Muammar Gaddafi, and on the later resignation of President Hosni Mubarak in Egypt.

In 2013, he left his Cairo posting because of severe headaches and returned to Britain where he was diagnosed with an incurable brain tumour; he died in late July.
