= Rory Bremner =

Scottish comedian

Rory Bremner FKC
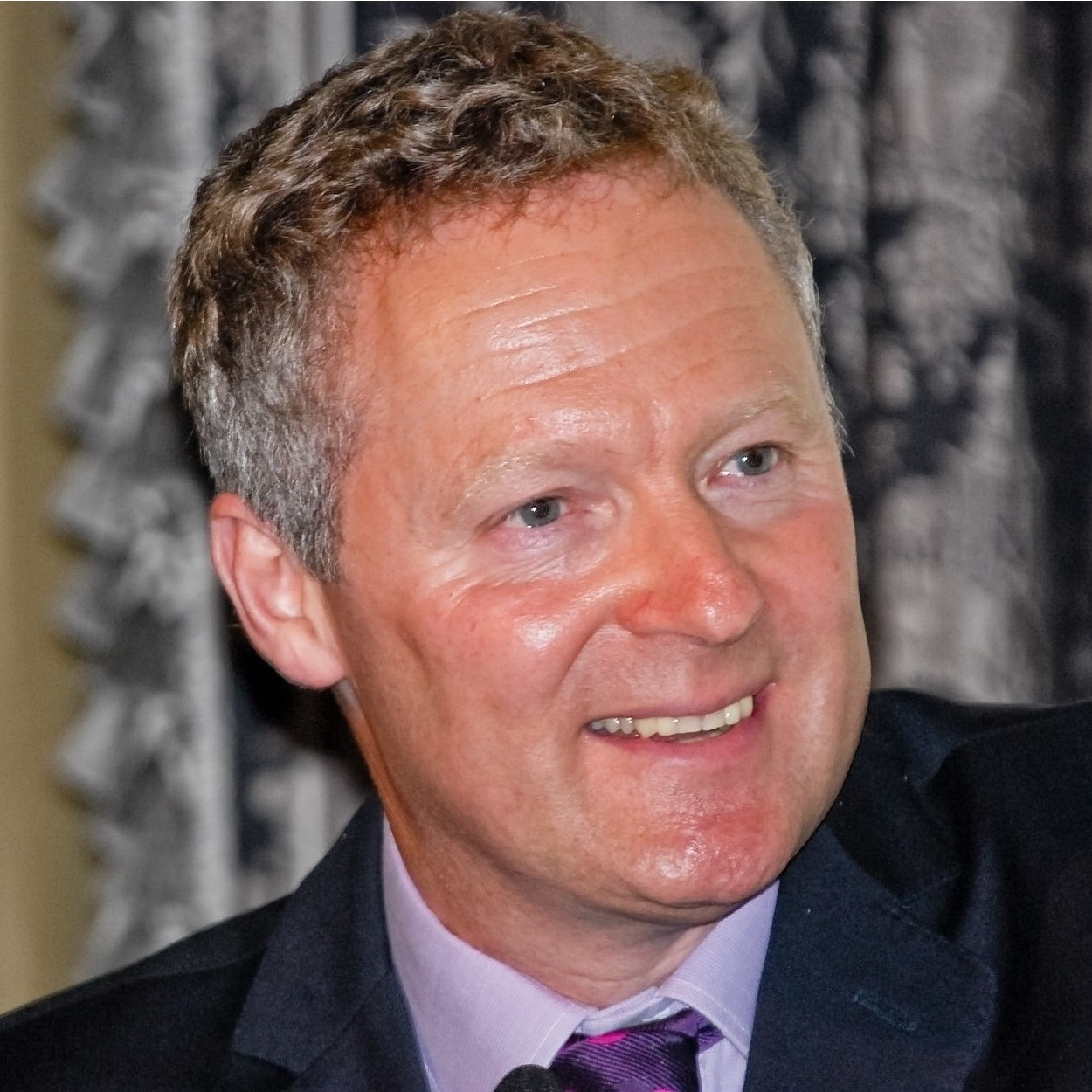
- Bremner in 2007
- Born: Roderick Keith Ogilvy Bremner; 6 April 1961 (age 65); Edinburgh, Scotland
- Education: King's College London (BA)
- Occupations: Comedian, impressionist, playwright
- Years active: 1985–present
- Spouses: Susan Shackelton (m. 1987; div. 1995) Tessa Campbell Fraser (m. 1999)
- Children: 2

Roderick Keith Ogilvy "Rory" Bremner, (born 6 April 1961) is a Scottish impressionist and comedian, noted for his work in political satire and impressions of British public figures. He is best known for co-starring with John Bird and John Fortune in the comedy sketch shows Rory Bremner...Who Else? and Bremner, Bird and Fortune, as well as being a team captain on the first two series of comedy panel show Mock the Week.

== Early life ==
Bremner was born in Edinburgh, the son of Major Donald Stuart Ogilvy Bremner (1907–1979) and his second wife Ann Simpson (1922–2001). He has an older brother and an older half-sister (from his father's first marriage). Bremner was educated at Clifton Hall School and Wellington College, and then studied Modern Languages at King's College London, graduating with a degree in French and German in 1984.

In 2009, Bremner was the subject of the series Who Do You Think You Are? in a quest to research about his father, whom he barely knew. His father had served in the 1st Battalion, East Lancashire Regiment during the Second World War and was often away from home. Bremner travelled to 's-Hertogenbosch, the Dutch city liberated by the East Lancs, amongst other places to retrace his father's footsteps. Together with his brother, they traced their father's ancestry and discovered that their great-grandfather John Ogilvy had served as a "surgeon general" (equivalent of the present-day senior Royal Army Medical Corps medical officer) during the Crimean War and was later posted to British colonies.

== Career ==
While studying at King's College London, he worked on the cabaret circuit in the evenings and was also active in a student drama club. He first came into the limelight in 1985, when his single, "N-N-Nineteen Not Out" (released under the name of the Commentators) became a hit in the British charts. It was a parody of Paul Hardcastle's number one hit, "19", with Bremner impersonating cricket commentators, including Richie Benaud, John Arlott, and Brian Johnston, and replacing references to the Vietnam War with references to the England cricket team's disastrous 1984 home series against the West Indies, in which the England captain David Gower had averaged 19. An uncredited Hardcastle himself played all the instruments.

Bremner contributed to And There's More, Spitting Image, and Week Ending, and by 1987 he had his own BBC 2 sketch show, Now – Something Else. In 1993 he moved to Channel 4, teaming up with comedy veterans John Bird and John Fortune for Rory Bremner...Who Else? where his output became more satirical and the sporting commentators gradually came to represent a smaller proportion of his repertoire. In 1999 the show changed its name to Bremner, Bird and Fortune. Over the years the show won numerous awards. Bremner became well known for his impersonations of Tony Blair, Gordon Brown and various other government figures. Bremner, Bird and Fortune ended in 2010.

During the 1990s Bremner was also a semi-regular performer on the Channel 4 improvisational comedy show Whose Line Is It Anyway?. In 2005 and 2006 he was a team captain for the first two series of the BBC Two satirical comedy panel show Mock the Week.

Bremner has performed on Sunday AM, impersonating politicians, with a review of recent political events. He has also presented a BBC Radio 4 series, Rory Bremner's International Satirists, in which he talks to comedians and impressionists from other European countries. In September 2009, he presented a BBC Four documentary, Rory Bremner and the Fighting Scots, about the history of Scots serving in the British Army. In the run-up to the 2010 UK General Election, he performed a 20-date Election Battlebus Tour, his first stand-up comedy tour in five years.

Bremner has translated three operas into English: Der Silbersee by Kurt Weill, Carmen by Georges Bizet, and Orpheus in the Underworld by Jacques Offenbach. In April 2007, he took part in The Big Brecht Fest at the Young Vic Theatre in London celebrating the work of German dramatist Bertolt Brecht, where a series of newly translated versions of some of Brecht's short plays were performed. One of the plays—the short comedy of manners A Respectable Wedding—was newly translated by Bremner, who also penned the title to the series.

Bremner took part in the 2011 series of Strictly Come Dancing. His dance partner in the series was Erin Boag and on 23 October 2011, he was the 3rd celebrity to be eliminated.

In 2012, Bremner appeared on the BBC Four programme, The Story of Light Entertainment, in an episode about impressionists.

In January 2013, he began hosting a new Channel 4 quiz show, Face the Clock.

In 2013, Bremner presented Rory Goes to Holyrood, a one-off show for BBC Scotland that takes a satirical look at Scottish politics and the independence referendum. The programme was announced in March 2013, with plans for it to be aired later in the year. In a BBC press release for the show, Bremner spoke of his reasons for recording the programme. "Coming back to Scotland in the run-up to the Referendum, I realised I knew almost nothing about Scottish Politics. Time I did. And why is there so little political comedy in Scotland outside the Parliament? Time to make sense (and nonsense) of it all." The programme featured Bremner presenting a one-off stand-up routine at Edinburgh's Assembly Hall, airing on 13 June 2013. Bremner subsequently called for there to be more satire in the referendum debate: "There's great humour to be had. There's a lot of big, different characters involved and good arguments, and there are plenty of good Scottish comedians who can have plenty of fun with it. It's far too dangerous to leave it only to the politically minded."

In 2015, he returned to TV comedy with two political satire programmes on BBC Two: "Rory Bremner's Coalition Report", a satirical summary of the previous five years in British Politics, and the "Election Report", a satire of the 2015 General Election.

Bremner is patron of the London-based drama school Associated Studios.

From 2016, Bremner has been a team captain on the ITV comedy game show The Imitation Game, a panel show hosted by Alexander Armstrong based around impressions.

In late 2016, he featured in the BBC Radio 4 miniseries Desolation Jests alongside David Jason, Jan Ravens and John Bird. The four-part show was written by David Renwick.

In September 2024, Bremner appeared live on an ABP Townhall with Captain Simon Bird.

== Recognition ==
Bremner was awarded honorary life membership of the King's College London Students' Union in the early 2000s. In 2005 he was made a fellow of his alma mater, King's College London. Additionally, he was awarded an honorary fellowship by Queen Mary, University of London, in 2008.

Bremner also received an honorary doctorate from Heriot-Watt University in 2011.

He was placed at 49 on ITV's list of TV's 50 Greatest Stars, and in 2008 received the James Joyce Award of the Literary and Historical Society.

== Political views ==
In a 2001 interview, Bremner expressed his disillusionment with the premiership of Tony Blair, despite being initially optimistic about him. He said: "When I first met Tony Blair in 1996, he was open and idealistic, keen to bring a breath of fresh air to government. But something happened – was it just the arrogance of power? – that narrowed Labour's vision from purposeful reform and investment, to peevish and petulant pragmatism." However, he remained an outspoken critic of the Conservative Party, saying: "How dare they look at the railways, the schools, the hospitals, and say the priority is tax cuts?" Bremner supported Reg Keys in the 2005 general election when he stood against Tony Blair as an anti-war candidate.

Bremner opposed Scottish independence in the 2014 referendum, arguing that "social justice, a fairer society and the NHS don’t stop at the border" and that people should "fight for those things within the Union". He was also one of several celebrities who endorsed the parliamentary candidacy of the Green Party's Caroline Lucas at the 2015 general election.

In August 2018, Bremner spoke at a People's Vote rally in Edinburgh; People's Vote was a campaign group calling for a public vote on the final Brexit deal between the UK and the European Union.

== Personal life ==
Bremner's first marriage was to Susan Shackleton, a teacher, in 1987; the couple divorced in 1995. On 11 September 1999, Bremner married Tessa Campbell Fraser; they have two daughters.

Bremner speaks French and German and studied Russian at O-level.

Bremner has been diagnosed with ADHD.
