= Rory Goes to Holyrood =

Television film

Rory Goes to Holyrood is a 2013 satirical documentary presented by Scottish impressionist and comedian Rory Bremner. Aired by BBC Two Scotland on 13 June 2013, the hour-long programme takes a satirical look at Scottish politics and the independence debate, two subjects that had largely seen an absence of humour up to that point. The film sees Bremner visit the Scottish Parliament and interview politicians and other senior public figures as he gets to grips with the issues of the Scottish political scene. Bremner recorded the programme after moving back to live in Scotland and realising he knew very little about the politics of that country.

== Background ==
Details of the programme were announced by the BBC Media Centre in March 2013, with plans for it to be aired later in the year. Bremner had recently returned to live in Scotland after spending much of his life in England, and as part of the press release for the show, he gave some insight into his reasons for recording it. "Coming back to Scotland in the run-up to the Referendum, I realised I knew almost nothing about Scottish Politics. Time I did. And why is there so little political comedy in Scotland outside the Parliament? Time to make sense (and nonsense) of it all."

2013 also saw Bremner defend fellow comedian Susan Calman, whose attempt to satirise the referendum debate on BBC Radio 4's The News Quiz led to her receiving death threats on social media from users who had been offended by her comments. Bremner himself spoke of a strong reaction to the announcement of his show, telling The Scotsman in June 2013 "I didn't get it to the extent that Susan Calman did, but the strength of feeling surprised me." He also noted that from a comedy perspective, there are people who "think [First Minister] Alex Salmond should be off limits, even though Alex Salmond himself has a very good sense of humour and understands that political comedians are part of a healthy democracy." The Scotsman later noted that "many observers have complained of a lack of satire in the mainstream media and lamented the fact even light-hearted attempts to lampoon the Scottish political scene have triggered an explosion of online bile."

The programme aired on BBC Two Scotland on 13 June 2013. Shortly before it was broadcast, Bremner said that recording it had left him undecided on the question of Scottish independence. "On the debate itself, I started the programme with an open mind and, funnily enough, ended it with a perhaps more open mind." He subsequently called for there to be more satire in the referendum debate. "There’s great humour to be had. There’s a lot of big, different characters involved and good arguments, and there are plenty of good Scottish comedians who can have plenty of fun with it. It’s far too dangerous to leave it only to the politically minded."

== Synopsis ==
The programme follows Bremner—known for his impressions of UK politicians—as he searches for material to put together a show focusing on Scottish politics for the Edinburgh Fringe Festival, the first time he has tackled the subject. Speaking to politicians, journalists and other public figures, he seeks to get to grips with Scotland's political scene, as well as the issues surrounding the independence debate, also assembling a team of his fellow comedians to help. The group, including Andy Zaltzman, Julia Sutherland and Paul Sneddon, discusses potential material with Bremner, and identifies characteristics and topics that could be used in a stand-up routine. Sheldon says that one of the problems with putting together such a show is that many people cannot identify the key figures at Holyrood, something highlighted by Bremner himself during a street survey in which he asks members of the public to name Scotland's politicians.

Undaunted by the lack of public recognition of those he intends to lampoon, Bremner works on his material, listening to recordings of First Minister Alex Salmond and other politicians as he drives between appointments. He is given a tour of the Scottish Parliament Building by MSP Joan McAlpine and watches a session of the Scottish Parliament. He also travels to Westminster to interview Ian Davidson, chair of the Scottish Affairs Select Committee. The documentary ends with Brember presenting a one-off stand-up routine at Edinburgh's Assembly Hall.
