= University Hospital Southampton NHS Foundation Trust =

NHS foundation trust in Southampton

- Type: NHS foundation trust
- Headquarters: Southampton, Hampshire, England
- Hospitals: Princess Anne Hospital; Southampton General Hospital
- Staff: 11,200 (2020/21)
- Website: www.uhs.nhs.uk

University Hospital Southampton NHS Foundation Trust is an NHS foundation trust which operates the Southampton General Hospital, the Princess Anne Hospital, Southampton Children’s Hospital, and the New Forest Birth Centre at Ashurst, Hampshire. It also provides a few services at the Royal South Hants Hospital and previously operated Countess Mountbatten House, a palliative care service at Moorgreen Hospital, which has since been renamed Mountbatten Hampshire.

== Hospitals ==
All hospitals operated by the trust ultimately come under the University Hospital Southampton name. All hospitals below are therefore teaching hospitals. Holistically, the trust provides both local hospital services, as well as specialist services, which few hospitals in the UK can provide.

=== The Southampton General Hospital ===
The hospital was founded in 1900 as the Southampton Union Infirmary in Shirley Warren, Southampton, to replace hospital beds previously provided at the workhouse infirmary in St Mary's, Southampton. The original building, housing 289 beds, cost £64,800 to construct; it has since been demolished. This hospital forms the backbone of UHS, with it operating all services, other than paediatric and maternity care. It also operates the only Accident and Emergency in Southampton. Within the hospital, there is also an eye hospital.

=== The Southampton Children's Hospital ===
The hospital is located fully within the General Hospital. It is one of the top three paediatric centres in the UK, with it covering 'almost every specialism'. This hospital looks after all patients the trust looks after, that are under the age of 18.

=== The Princess Anne Hospital ===
The hospital was opened by Princess Anne on 28 March 1981. The hospital only provides maternity care, with it seeing roughly 6000 patients a year. The hospital is located next to the General Hospital, with Coxford Road dividing the sites. The hospital is renowned for its achievements with premature births.

=== Other locations ===
==== The New Forest Birth Centre ====
This is the trusts' smallest location, being located in Ashurst, Hampshire. It provides maternity support as well as antenatal care.

==== The Royal South Hants Hospital ====
This site is managed by NHS Properties, with the UHS providing a few services here.

==== Lymington New Forest Hospital ====
This hospital is run by Southern Health NHS Foundation Trust. UHS provides surgical services at this hospital.

== Developments ==
The trust has one of the 11 Genomics Medicines Centres associated with Genomics England which opened across England in February 2014. All the data produced in the 100,000 Genomes project will be made available to drugs companies and researchers to help them create precision drugs for future generations.

Demand for medical imaging has been increasing by between 10% and 15% a year cumulatively since 2005. They now have 3 Siemens MRI scanners.

It is one of the biggest provider of specialised services in England, which generated an income of £262.2 million in 2014/5.

In 2016 the trust established a subsidiary company, UHS Estates Limited. The intention was to achieve VAT benefits, as well as pay bill savings, by recruiting new staff on less expensive non-NHS contracts. VAT benefits arise because NHS trusts can only claim VAT back on a small subset of goods and services they buy. The Value Added Tax Act 1994 provides a mechanism through which NHS trusts can qualify for refunds on contracted out services.

In September, the trust was selected by NHS England as one of twelve Global Digital Exemplars.

Previously operated Countess Mountbatten House, a palliative care service at Moorgreen Hospital, which has since been renamed Mountbatten Hampshire.

== Performance ==
It was named by the Health Service Journal as one of the top hundred NHS trusts to work for in 2015. At that time it had 8280 full-time equivalent staff and a sickness absence rate of 3.45%. 77% of staff recommend it as a place for treatment and 68% recommended it as a place to work.

In October 2018 it was reported that more than 7,000 ophthalmology patients had not been given appropriate follow up appointments. The trust said there had been a 5% rise in patients every year and demand had outstripped capacity in most NHS trusts.

In December 2022, the hospital declared a critical incident due to extreme pressure on its service.

== Controversies ==
=== Ashya King ===
In August 2014, Brett and Naghemeh King took their 5-year-old son Ashya from the hospital, where he was being treated for medulloblastoma, without doctor's knowledge. Brett King claimed this was in order to avoid the proposed treatment of chemotherapy and photon beam radiation therapy which he feared would result in brain damage to Ashya. The family's preferred treatment was proton beam therapy which was at the time unavailable in the United Kingdom except through an NHS overseas referral programme to fund treatment in America or Europe for specific indications. Although clinicians at Southampton felt proton beam therapy would not be beneficial in this case, it was discussed with the Kings and referred to the Proton Clinical Reference Panel although medulloblastoma is not an approved diagnosis to qualify for the overseas programme.

The Kings were keen to arrange proton beam therapy at a hospital in Prague. When the parents asked what would happen if they refused any kind of treatment, they were told the hospital could seek an emergency protection order. When the child subsequently went missing the hospital informed the police and the CPS issued a warrant for the arrest of the parents. Once it was revealed that the child had left the country, extradition back to the UK was also sought. The family were eventually located in Spain, where the parents were arrested and child put in a high dependency ward in a hospital in Málaga. David Cameron, the prime minister, called for "an urgent outbreak of common sense".

Ashya began proton beam therapy at the Proton Therapy Centre in Prague on 15 September. In late September NHS England agreed to fund the cost of the proton therapy treatment. NHS England had been told by the European Court of Justice to fund treatment abroad in previous cases. In March 2015 the King family announced that the treatment appeared to have been successful and Ashya's most recent scan showed no sign of the tumour.

=== Burger King ===
There had been a Burger King outlet in the foyer of the hospital since 1997. In November 2014 the Trust announced that they would not be renewing its lease due to expire in 2016 - because it no longer fits with the "healthcare environment" it is trying to create in its main reception area. Hampshire GP Dr Hilary Jones approved and said that in the grip of an obesity problem in the UK, hospitals should be setting a good example to patients. However some patients started a petition against this decision on the basis that hospital food was "of a poor standard. Burger King seems to have a much higher quality of food that's cooked fresh and to order."

A hospital spokesman responded: "The trust, as with all NHS hospitals, is regularly assessed by a variety of independent bodies on all aspects of care, including the quality of patient food. In the most recent of these inspections, the trust scored highly on food quality (92%) according to panel members from the national patient-led assessment team and fully compliant with all of the Care Quality Commission's essential standards, which incorporate quality of food and drink." The fast food outlet was replaced by a Marks & Spencer shop and cafe and a Subway franchise as part of a £2.5m redevelopment which began in mid-2015.

== Media coverage ==
The General Hospital was the location for the daytime TV fly-on-the-wall documentary series, The General and the ITV documentary series Trauma: Level One. The Princess Anne was the setting of the first two series of Channel 4's One Born Every Minute.
