= Sport Relief's Top Dog =

- Also known as: Top Dog
- Genre: Entertainment
- Presented by: Gaby Roslin
- Country of origin: United Kingdom
- Original language: English
- No. of series: 1
- No. of episodes: 15 (list of episodes)

Production
- Production locations: The Maidstone Studios, Kent
- Running time: 30 minutes

Original release
- Network: BBC Two
- Release: 3 March – 21 March 2014

Sport Relief's Top Dog is a British BBC Two game show hosted by Gaby Roslin. The first series began airing on 3 March 2014 and ended on 21 March 2014.

The series consisted of 15 episodes aired over three consecutive weeks in the run up to Sport Relief 2014. The show saw celebrities and their dogs lead a team consisting of two other dogs and their owners battle it out in a series of challenges to claim the title of 'Top Dog 2014'. The winners of the first series were Gail Emms with her Westie Raffa and their team.

== Production ==
The series was recorded at The Maidstone Studios in Kent from 26 January to 1 February 2014.

== Episode guide ==
#	Air Date	Blue Team	Red Team
1	3 March 2014	**Jules Hudson and Iolo**; Karen and Jazzy; Jim and Rhea	**Ainsley Harriott and Bobby**; Joe and Taylor; Fiona and Frazzle
2	4 March 2014	**Chris Hollins and Winnie**; Danny and Bailey; Lorna and Yoshi	**Deena Payne and Mickie Pink**; Claire and Magic; Elaine and Millie
3	5 March 2014	**Diarmuid Gavin and Roxie**; Vicki and Niko; Lorraine and Toffee	**Jasmine Harman and Shadow**; Gail and Teazle; Ann and Digger
4	6 March 2014	**Gail Emms and Raffa**; Ian and Maysie; Jeff and Buzz	**Debra Stephenson and Biscuit**; Brendan and Arnold; Tracy and Echo
5	7 March 2014	**Gemma Merna and Paige**; Richard and Hugo; Karena and Magic	**Jodie Prenger and Hogan**; Ray and Bailey; Nicole and Maggie
6	10 March 2014	**Caprice and Roly**; Neil and Monty; Charlotte and Coral	**Sharron Davies and Pig**; Dawn and Tilly; Gareth and Emmie
7	11 March 2014	**O.J. Borg and Lebowski**; Sue and Pippin; Claire and Indy	**Jenni Falconer and Alfie**; Jay and Cedar; Andrew and Tag
8	12 March 2014	**Charley Boorman and Ziggy**; Jenni and Lillie; Adam and Hugo	**Matthew Wright and Wiggie**; Tanya and Max; Marie and Blaze
9	13 March 2014	**Willie Thorne and Alfie**; John and Jimmy; Hayley and Daisy	**Matt Allwright and Ozzie Ozbone**; Eryl and Barney; Lesley and Whizz
10	14 March 2014	**Sally Gunnell and Diggy**; Tom and Tara; Nicci and Leo	**Peaches Geldof and Parper**; Tracey and Woody; Fay and Ernie
11	17 March 2014	**Louise Minchin and Holly**; Matt and Peppa; Christina and Flyte	**Martin Roberts and Mylo**; Sally and Poppy; Sam and Kai
12	18 March 2014	**Danny Baker and Bingo**; Amy and Usha; Chas and Jazz	**Mark Durden-Smith and Flossy**; Claire and Doyle; Debbie and Willy
13	19 March 2014 (Semi-final 1)	**Louise Minchin and Holly**; Matt and Peppa; Christina and Flyte	**Sally Gunnell and Diggy**; Tom and Tara; Nicci and Leo
14	20 March 2014 (Semi-final 2)	**Gail Emms and Raffa**; Ian and Maysie; Jeff and Buzz	**Jenni Falconer and Alfie**; Jay and Cedar; Andrew and Tag
15	21 March 2014 (The final)	**Gail Emms and Raffa**; Ian and Maysie; Jeff and Buzz	**Sally Gunnell and Diggy**; Tom and Tara; Nicci and Leo

- The winning team is indicated in the Gold box
- The celebrity team captain is indicated in **Bold**

== Games ==
Game	1	2	3	4	5	6	7	8	9	10	11	12	13	14	15
"The Bark Off"															
"New Balls Please"															
"Canine Coconuts"															
"Hot Spot Hound"															
"Slam Dunk Splash"															
"Newshound"															
"Desert Island Sit"															
"Reservoir Dogs"															
"Bowl'Em Over"															
"The Great Slipper Snatch"															
"Catch of the Day"															
"The Pup Quiz"															
"The Drop Zone"															
"Hoopla Splash"															
"Mutt Mayhem"															
"Duck Pond Derby"															
"Top Gun Dog"															
"Hurdling Hounds"															
"Swing Low Sweet Chewy Sausage"															
"Pawprint Sprint"															
"Dog Tired"															
"Leaf it Out"															
"Duck Down"															
"Dog's Dinner"															
"Pooch Petrol"															
"Buoy Zone"															
"Pawmula 1"															
"The Hound of Music"															
"Pooch Puns"															
"Spot On"															
"The Dog's Bowl"															
"Take It Or Leave It"															
"Sherlock Bones"															
"Message in a Bottle"															
"Call of Nature"															
"Dogsbodies"															
"Shop 'til You Drop"															

== Qualifying for the semi-finals ==
The fastest four teams from "The Bark Off" were invited back for the semi-final rounds of the show which were aired on 19–20 March 2014.

Show	Team	Time	Overall result
1	Jules Hudson	4:10	7th place
2	Chris Hollins	4:04	5th place
3	Diarmuid Gavin	4:06	6th place
4	Gail Emms	3:33/3:01/3:17	Winners
5	Gemma Merna	4:20	8th place
6	Caprice	4:35	9th place
7	Jenni Falconer	3:41/3:23	3rd place
8	Matthew Wright	4:53	11th place
9	Willie Thorne	4:52	10th place
10	Sally Gunnell	3:19/2:55/3:24	Runners-Up
11	Louise Minchin	3:37/3:01	4th place
12	Danny Baker	5:22	12th place
