= The Saturday Show (2015 TV series) =

- Genre: Magazine and chat
- Presented by: Gaby Roslin; Matt Allwright (2016); Matt Barbet (2015–16)
- Country of origin: United Kingdom
- No. of series: 2
- No. of episodes: 49

Production
- Running time: 120 minutes (inc. adverts)
- Production company: Princess Productions

Original release
- Network: Channel 5
- Release: 31 October 2015 – 1 October 2016

Related
- Weekend; Sunday Brunch; Saturday Kitchen

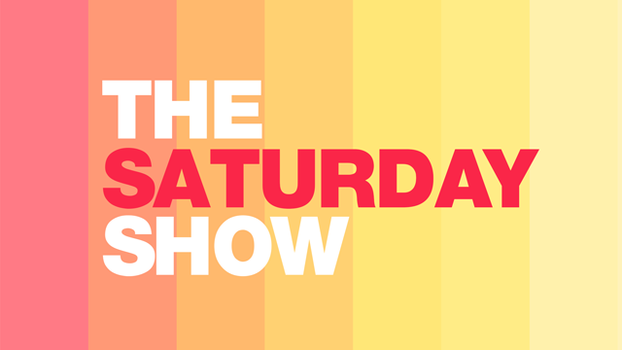
The Saturday Show title card

The Saturday Show Live is a British television programme presented by Gaby Roslin and Matt Allwright which was broadcast live on Channel 5 on Saturday mornings between 2015 and 2016.

== Presenters ==
Presenters
| Presenter | Appearances | Notes |
|---|---|---|
| Gaby Roslin | 46 | |
| Matt Barbet | 34 | |
| Matt Allwright | 12 | Originally Guest Presenter |
| Amanda Lamb | 3 | Occasional Stand-in for Roslin |
| Iain Lee | 1 | |
| Mark Dolan | 1 | |
| John Thomson | 1 | |

=== Guest presenters ===
Guest Presenters
| Date | Presenter | Notes |
|---|---|---|
| 5 March 2016 | John Thomson | Stand-in for Matt Barbet |
| 2 April 2016 | Amanda Lamb | Stand-in for Gaby Roslin |
| 4 June 2016 | Matt Allwright | Stand-in for Matt Barbet |
| 30 July 2016 | Amanda Lamb | Stand-in for Gaby Roslin |
| 6 August 2016 | Amanda Lamb | Stand-in for Gaby Roslin |
| 14 August 2016 | Mark Dolan | Stand-in for Matt Allwright |
| 20 August 2016 | Iain Lee | Stand-in for Matt Allwright |

=== Reporters ===
- Craig Stevens (Showbiz news)
- Stacey Solomon (Correspondent)
- David Domoney (Gardening)
- Joe Inglis (Pets)
- Pollyanna Woodward (Gadgets)

== Episode guide ==
| Series | Episodes | Originally aired | |
| Series | Episodes | First aired | Last aired |
|---|---|---|---|
| 1 | 30 | 31 October 2015 | 21 May 2016 |
| 2 | 19 | 28 May 2016 | 1 October 2016 |

=== Series 1 (2015–2016) ===
| # | Date | Hosts | | Guests |
|---|---|---|---|---|
| 1 | 31 October 2015 | Matt Barbet | Gaby Roslin | Ashley Walters, Nina Wadia and Mark Dolan |
| 2 | 7 November 2015 | Matt Barbet | Gaby Roslin | Rebecca Adlington, Russell Kane and Adam Garcia |
| 3 | 14 November 2015 | Matt Barbet | Gaby Roslin | Kimberly Wyatt, Christian Jessen and Melvin Odoom |
| 4 | 21 November 2015 | Matt Barbet | Gaby Roslin | Claire Goose, Hal Cruttenden and Rav Wilding |
| 5 | 28 November 2015 | Matt Barbet | Gaby Roslin | Tamzin Outhwaite, Nish Kumar and Martin Hughes-Games |
| 6 | 5 December 2015 | Matt Barbet | Gaby Roslin | Jane McDonald, Mark Watson and Michael Underwood |
| 7 | 12 December 2015 | Matt Barbet | Gaby Roslin | Sheree Murphy, Paul Chowdhry and Joe McGann |
| 8 | 19 December 2015 | Matt Barbet | Gaby Roslin | Jade Ewen, Brian Friedman, John Thomson, Sian Welby and G4 |
| 9 | 26 December 2015 | Matt Barbet | Gaby Roslin | Sian Williams, Mark Dolan and Debra Stephenson |
| 10 | 2 January 2016 | Matt Barbet | Gaby Roslin | Kimberly Wyatt, Iain Lee, Louise Hazel and The Body Coach |
| 11 | 9 January 2016 | Matt Barbet | Gaby Roslin | Vicky Pattison, Richard Herring, Nina Wadia and Winston McKenzie |
| 12 | 16 January 2016 | Matt Barbet | Gaby Roslin | Sarah Beeny, Louis Smith, Stefan Gates and Josie Gibson |
| 13 | 23 January 2016 | Matt Barbet | Gaby Roslin | Pixie McKenna, Scott Mills, Jenny Eclair and Megan McKenna |
| 14 | 30 January 2016 | Matt Barbet | Gaby Roslin | Paul Sinha, Hayley Tamaddon, Wayne Sleep, Laura Hamilton, Michael Mosley, Christopher Maloney and Jeremy McConnell |
| 15 | 6 February 2016 | Matt Barbet | Gaby Roslin | Tyger Drew-Honey, Susie Amy, John Partridge, Tiffany Pollard, Scott Timlin and Gurinder Chadha |
| 16 | 13 February 2016 | Matt Barbet | Gaby Roslin | Linda Robson, Stacey Solomon, Anthea Turner, Russell Grant, Lemar and William Hanson |
| 17 | 20 February 2016 | Matt Barbet | Gaby Roslin | Jason Donovan, Denise Welch, Grace Dent, Louise Hazel, Levi Roots and Dave Spikey |
| 18 | 27 February 2016 | Matt Barbet | Gaby Roslin | Carol Vorderman, Jason Bradbury, Ruby Wax, Rebecca Adlington and Bobby Norris |
| 19 | 5 March 2016 | John Thomson | Gaby Roslin | Lee Mead, Rav Wilding, Zoe Lucker, Tameka Empson, Ashleigh and Pudsey and Bobby George |
| 20 | 12 March 2016 | Matt Barbet | Gaby Roslin | Julia Bradbury, Anton du Beke, Amy Childs and Lisa Maxwell |
| 21 | 19 March 2016 | Matt Barbet | Gaby Roslin | Dawn Harper, Shaun Williamson, Heidi Range, Chloe Madeley and David Domoney |
| 22 | 26 March 2016 | Matt Barbet | Gaby Roslin | Kimberly Wyatt, Tony Hadley and Sarah Parish |
| 23 | 2 April 2016 | Matt Barbet | Amanda Lamb | Jane McDonald, Wayne Hemingway and Ashley Banjo |
| 24 | 9 April 2016 | Matt Barbet | Gaby Roslin | Hannah Spearritt, Iwan Thomas, Arabella Weir, Jake Quickenden and Carl Fogarty |
| 25 | 16 April 2016 | Matt Barbet | Gaby Roslin | Chris Hollins, Gemma Oaten, Jamie Laing and Ally Fowler |
| 26 | 23 April 2016 | Matt Barbet | Gaby Roslin | Matt Allwright, Jo Joyner and Shayne Ward |
| 27 | 30 April 2016 | Matt Barbet | Gaby Roslin | Ronan Keating, Melvin Odoom, Sally Lindsay, Craig Parkinson, Daniel Mays and Nick Knowles |
| 28 | 7 May 2016 | Matt Barbet | Gaby Roslin | Sunetra Sarker, Christian Jessen, Stacey Solomon, Ian Waite and Natalie Lowe |
| 29 | 14 May 2016 | Matt Barbet | Gaby Roslin | Nathan Sykes, Jodie Prenger, Katie Piper and Midge Ure |
| 30 | 21 May 2016 | Matt Barbet | Gaby Roslin | Jon Culshaw, Sarah Willingham, Kerry Howard and Josie Gibson |

=== Series 2 (2016) ===
| # | Date | Hosts | | Guests |
|---|---|---|---|---|
| 1 | 28 May 2016 | Matt Barbet | Gaby Roslin | Tamzin Outhwaite, John Partridge, Kieron Richardson, Food Busker, Caspar Lee and Antony Costa |
| 2 | 4 June 2016 | Matt Allwright | Gaby Roslin | Bonnie Langford, Richard Herring, Ferne McCann, Paul Brown and Reggie 'n' Bollie |
| 3 | 11 June 2016 | Matt Barbet | Gaby Roslin | Jerry Springer, Lisa Faulkner, Beverley Knight, Nina Conti, Grant Harold and Stacey Solomon |
| 4 | 18 June 2016 | Matt Barbet | Gaby Roslin | Louie Spence, Rick Edwards, Nicola Stephenson, The Neales and Laura Hamilton |
| 5 | 25 June 2016 | Matt Barbet | Gaby Roslin | Mark Dolan, Linda Robson, Lydia Bright, Kate Quilton, Nile Rodgers and John Whaite |
| 6 | 2 July 2016 | Matt Barbet | Gaby Roslin | Angela Griffin, Bruno Langley, Jason Byrne, Richard Jones and NHS Choir |
| 7 | 9 July 2016 | Matt Allwright | Gaby Roslin | Audley Harrison, Suzanne Shaw, Richard Madeley and Lawson |
| 8 | 16 July 2016 | Matt Allwright | Gaby Roslin | JB Gill, Tanya Franks and Andy Parsons |
| 9 | 23 July 2016 | Matt Allwright | Gaby Roslin | Rick Astley, Natalie Anderson, Jeremy Vine, Jonny Labey, Mike Dilger and Angela Scanlon |
| 10 | 30 July 2016 | Matt Allwright | Amanda Lamb | Joe Pasquale, Anita Dobson, Isy Suttie, James Murray, Dale Pinnock, Fiona Wilson and Dr Scott Millar |
| 11 | 6 August 2016 | Matt Allwright | Amanda Lamb | Iwan Thomas, Sam Bailey, Amelia Lily, Nikki Sanderson and Grant Bovey |
| 12 | 13 August 2016 | Mark Dolan | Gaby Roslin | Melanie Sykes, Louise Hazel, Jake Quickenden and Saira Khan |
| 13 | 20 August 2016 | Iain Lee | Gaby Roslin | Jay McGuiness, Jane McDonald, David Emanuel, James Whale, Lewis Bloor, Joe Michalczuk, Tom Gidman and Edd Kimber |
| 14 | 27 August 2016 | Matt Allwright | Gaby Roslin | Matthew Kelly, Cerys Matthews, Jamie Laing, Ricky Norwood, Marnie Simpson, Stephen Bear, Frankie Grande, Renee Graziano and John Quilter |
| 15 | 3 September 2016 | Matt Allwright | Gaby Roslin | Brian McFadden, Larry Lamb, Jenni Falconer, John Thomson, Sally Lindsay, Sean Conway and Theo Randall |
| 16 | 10 September 2016 | Matt Allwright | Gaby Roslin | Stacey Solomon, Paul Young, Sheree Murphy, Ben Richards, Beverley Knight, Michaela Chiappa and Max Murdoch |
| 17 | 17 September 2016 | Matt Allwright | Gaby Roslin | Ruth Langsford, Eamonn Holmes, Ferne McCann, Charlie Condou, Cher Lloyd, Marcus Bean, Karen David, Edd Kimber and John Rensford |
| 18 | 24 September 2016 | Matt Allwright | Gaby Roslin | Sophie Ellis Bextor, Stephen Tompkinson, Patrick Robinson, Vincent Simone, Flavia Cacace, Rich Harris and Joe Michalczuk |
| 19 | 1 October 2016 | Matt Allwright | Gaby Roslin | Tony Hadley, Aston Merrygold, Edith Bowman, Joe Herd, Cel Spellman and Joe Michalczuk |
