= Stephen O'Reilly (actor) =

Musician

- Born: Boston, Massachusetts, United States
- Occupations: Singer/Songwriter,Actor, musician

Stephen O'Reilly (Irish: Stiofán Ó Raghallaigh) -- aka Steve O'reilly-- is an American singer songwriter. His debut album "Sky Boxer" was released at the end of 2022 and has received rave reviews. Steve has also composed music for television including music for NBC's Olympic Games, ESPN, Good Morning America, Discovery's Cash Cab and First 48. He was the lead vocalist and primary songwriter for the band Tammany Hall NYC.

He has appeared as an actor in the films My Little Eye (2002), and The Prince and Me (2004).

His music has appeared in the films Eat This New York (2003), Into the Fire (2005), and the television series Sex and the City, Scrubs, It Takes a Thief, and Into Character, as well as various HBO advertisements.
