= William Chapman Hewitson =

British naturalist (1806–1878)

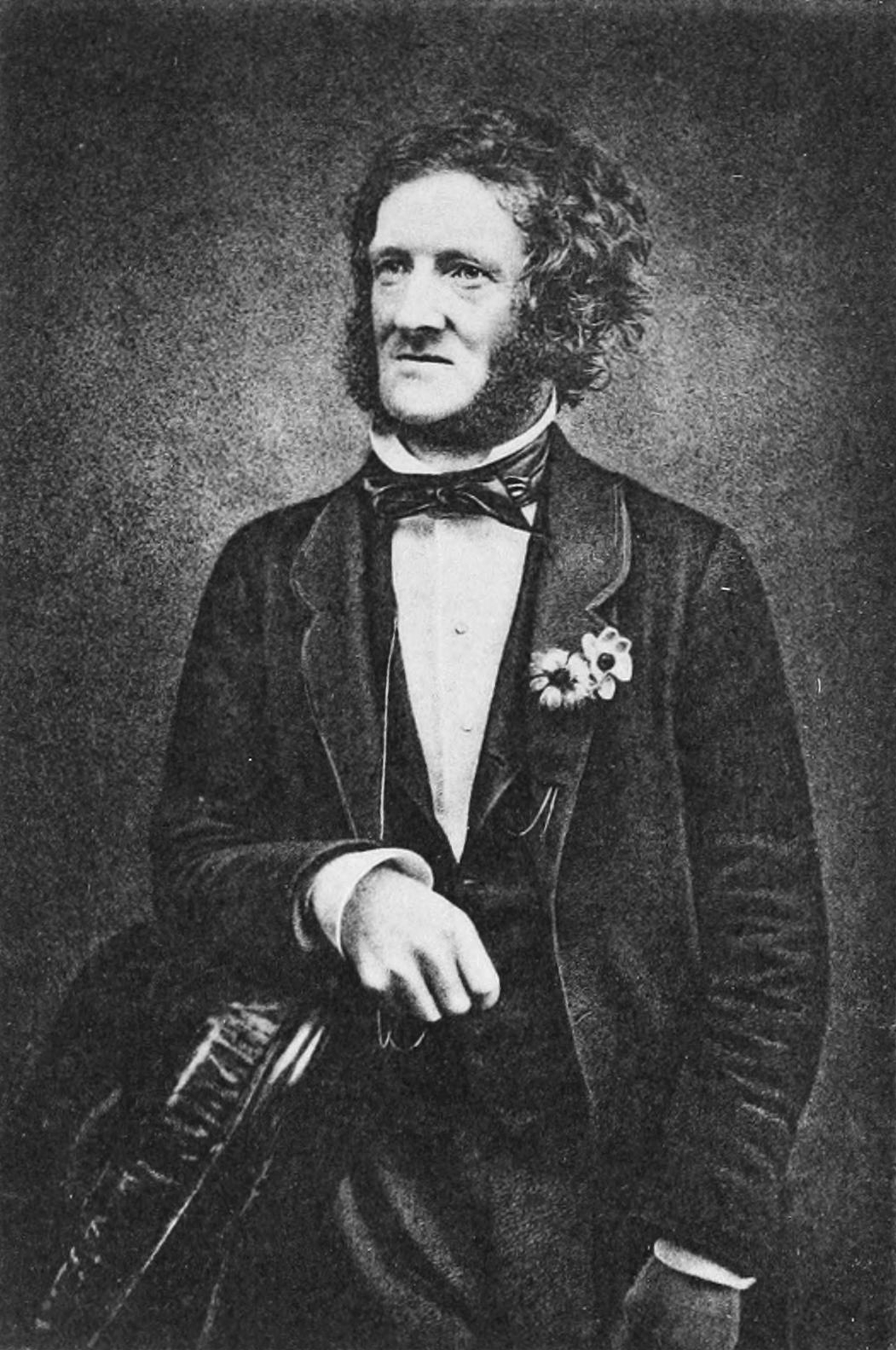
- Born: 9 January 1806; Newcastle-upon-Tyne, England
- Died: 28 May 1878 (aged 72); Oatlands Park, Surrey, England

William Chapman Hewitson (9 January 1806, in Newcastle upon Tyne – 28 May 1878, in Oatlands Park, Surrey) was a British naturalist. A wealthy collector, Hewitson was particularly devoted to Coleoptera (beetles) and Lepidoptera (butterflies and moths) and, also, to birds' nests and eggs. His collection of butterflies, collected by him as well as purchased from travellers throughout the world, was one of the largest and most important of his time. He contributed to and published many works on entomology and ornithology and was an accomplished scientific illustrator.

== Life ==
William Hewitson was educated in York. He became a land-surveyor and was for some time employed under George Stephenson on the London and Birmingham Railway. Delicate health and the accession to an ample fortune through the death of a relative led him to give up his profession and he afterwards devoted himself to scientific studies. He lived for a time at Bristol and Hampstead. In 1848 he purchased ten or twelve acres of Oatlands Park, Surrey, and built a house there. He remained at Oatlands for the rest of his life.

== Learned societies ==
Hewitson was a founding member of the Natural History Society of Northumberland, Durham and Newcastle upon Tyne in 1829, a member of the Entomological Society of London in 1846, the Zoological Society in 1859, and the Linnean Society in 1862.

== People associated with Hewitson ==
- Jean Baptiste Boisduval
- Baron Cajetan von Felder
- John Edward Gray
- William Wilson Saunders
- Alfred Russel Wallace

== Works ==
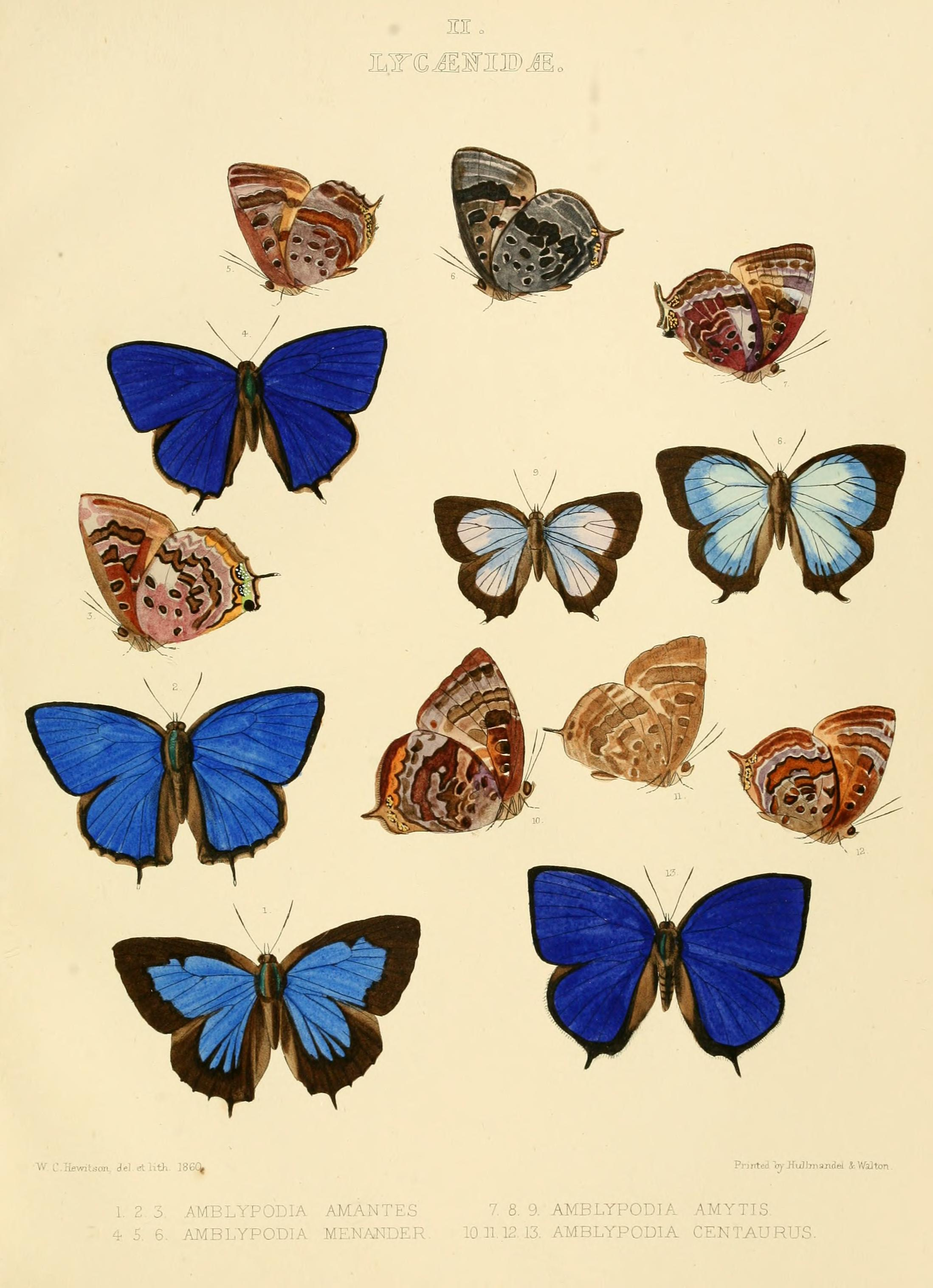
Plate II of Illustrations of Diurnal Lepidoptera, Lycaenidae

- (1831). British Oology: Being Illustrations of the Eggs of British Birds, With Figures of Each Species, As Far As Practicable, Drawn and Coloured from Nature: Accompanied by Descriptions of the Materials and Situation of Their Nests, Number of Eggs, &c. Published for the author, by Charles Empson, Newcastle upon Tyne.
- (1851, 1862–1871, 1878). Illustrations of New Species of Exotic Butterflies, Selected Chiefly from the Collections of W. Wilson Saunders and William C. Hewitson. Five volumes. London: John Van Voorst. Hewitson paid for the last volume when the trustees of the British Museum refused.
- (1862–1878). Illustrations of Diurnal Lepidoptera, Lycaenidae. London: John Van Voorst. Volume 1 Text Volume 2 plates.
- (1862). Specimen of a Catalogue of Lycaenidae in the British Museum by W.C. Hewitson. London: Printed by order of the Trustees
- (1867–1868). Descriptions of One Hundred New Species of Hesperidae. London: John Van Voorst
- with Frederic Moore (1879–1888). Descriptions of New Indian Lepidopterous Insects: From the Collection of the Late Mr. W.S. Atkinson, M.A., F.L.S., &c. Calcutta: The Asiatic Society of Bengal. OCLC 9625544
