= Saints and Scroungers =

British television series

- Genre: Consumer rights
- Presented by: Dominic Littlewood; Matt Allwright; Matt Bazeley
- Country of origin: United Kingdom
- Original language: English
- No. of series: 8
- No. of episodes: 155 (list of episodes)

Production
- Running time: 45 minutes

Original release
- Network: BBC One
- Release: 17 August 2009 – 2 October 2015

Related
- Watchdog; Fake Britain

Saints and Scroungers is a British television programme about welfare benefits, broadcast on BBC One and presented by Matt Allwright since 2013. It was presented by Dominic Littlewood from 2009 until 2012. But now more recently for the new series started on 7 September 2015, there is no physical presenter input but just an audio voice over from Mark Bazeley. It focuses on two groups of people: the vulnerable who need help and those who help them 'saints' and fraudulent claimants 'scroungers'. The series is repeated in the UK on Crime & Investigation Network.

== Transmissions ==
Series	Start date	End date	Episodes
1	17 August 2009	4 September 2009	15
2	3 January 2011	28 January 2011	20
3	2 January 2012	27 January 2012	20
4	11 February 2013	8 March 2013	20
5	28 October 2013	22 November 2013	20
6	22 September 2014	17 October 2014	20
7	19 January 2015	13 February 2015	20
8	7 September 2015	2 October 2015	20
