= Stephen O'Reilly =

Stephen O'Reilly may refer to:

- Stephen O'Reilly (actor) (born 1973), American actor and musician
- Stephen O'Reilly (footballer) (born 1972), Australian rules footballer
