= Don't Get Done, Get Dom =

- Genre: Consumer rights Investigative journalism
- Developed by: Flame Television
- Directed by: Bill Bailey; Christina Nutter; Carrie Preston; Claire Richmond
- Presented by: Dominic Littlewood
- Theme music composer: Barrie Bignold
- Country of origin: United Kingdom
- Original language: English
- No. of series: 9
- No. of episodes: 144

Production
- Executive producers: Matthew Gordon; Jacqueline Hewer
- Producers: Lydia Arding; Claire Featherstone
- Running time: 45 minutes

Original release
- Network: BBC One
- Release: 12 June 2006 – 29 May 2015

Don't Get Done, Get Dom is a British consumer rights television series. The show is named for its presenter Dominic Littlewood. Each series is transmitted, usually daily during daytime, on BBC One and repeated on BBC Two in the UK. During Series 7 it is co-presented by Rani Price.

Series nine premiered on 4 May 2015 and ended on 29 May 2015, lasting a total of 4 weeks and 20 episodes.

In September 2015, it was announced series nine would be the last.

== Format ==
The show also helps people who have been treated unfairly to get deals or refunds on products or services. Examples from the series are people who have had their wedding holiday spoilt by the company they booked with, and someone being overcharged by their mobile phone provider. Littlewood explores the gaps in regulation that allowed this injustice to happen.

Littlewood also deals with complaints to companies for matters such as excessive utility bills. In many cases customers receive a refund or prices are reduced to correct values.

There is a segment on the show dealing with what people know about their consumer rights and giving out tips on how to get best value for money.

During previous versions of the show, a member of the public was"tutored" into getting a better deal on a product which they are attempting to buy; typically giving them more confidence in talking to and making deals with the store assistants and managers. Examples from the series are people purchasing video cameras and sports gear.

This is achieved by Littlewood seeing camera footage of a first attempt, and giving them pointers. After this they try another shop but this time Littlewood can communicate to the member of the public by means of a hidden earpiece.

There was also previously a section where Littlewood attempts to save a shopper he meets in the street money by haggling the deal himself.

== Transmissions ==
=== Original Series ===
Series	Start date	End date	Episodes
1	12 June 2006	23 June 2006	10
2	19 March 2007	13 July 2007	20
3	2 June 2008	27 June 2008	20
4	24 May 2010	4 June 2010	10
5	25 April 2011	16 May 2011	15
6	9 April 2012	27 April 2012	15
7	15 April 2013	4 September 2013	20
8	31 March 2014	18 April 2014	20
9	4 May 2015	29 May 2015	20

== See also ==
- Fake Britain
- Rip Off Britain
- Watchdog
