= Tammany Hall NYC =

American band

- Origin: New York City, New York, United States
- Genres: Alternative rock Folk rock Power pop
- Years active: 1997–present
- Label: Glass Records
- Members: Steve O'Reilly; Matt Anthony; Dave Femia

Tammany Hall NYC, also abbreviated THNYC, is an independent rock band based in New York City. Their music has been used in various television shows such as The Sopranos, Into Character, Scrubs, It Takes a Thief and Sex and the City. Their music has also been used in the soundtracks for Into the Fire, an independent film by Michael Phelan, and the New York restaurant documentary Eat This New York.

== History ==
Their name is derived from the historic New York political organization Tammany Hall. Tammany Hall NYC formed in 1997, and soon began playing in local New York clubs. The group gained a strong local following, releasing their first album, Getawayland in 1999 under the independent label Glass Records. The following year they released Back In The Bottle, an acoustic album that had more of a folk music influence than its predecessor. The use of the song "Always on Sunday" in an HBO advertisement and "Wait for You" (a remix of "Wait for Jane") during the 2002 season of Sex and the City are largely responsible for the album's success. Also, the songs "Cindy", "To the Woman", "Goodnight Song", and "Someone" have been used on the NBC show Scrubs.

Buddy, their third album, was released in February 2003, and saw them returning to the louder mix of punk and alternative rock that had characterized their debut. The song "To the Woman," from this album, was featured on Scrubs on January 17, 2006. "Cindy," a re-recorded version of the song originally from Back In The Bottle, was also played on Scrubs in October 2003. Later in 2003, the soundtrack to Eat This New York was released, which showed a wide range of Latin and jazz influences on the band's part.

In December 2003 Tammany Hall NYC performed live for the Howard Dean fundraiser at the Roseland Ballroom in New York, where Dean greeted them personally.

In July 2005, the band released Marathon, which was their last studio album. On May 16, 2006, they also released the soundtrack of Into The Fire.

On May 24, 2006, the 2003-recorded version of "Cindy" reached number 99 on the top 100 singles on iTunes, from the newly released soundtrack to Scrubs (volume 2).

In addition to his work with Tammany Hall NYC, Stephen O'Reilly has been involved in solo projects and has acted in several films.

As of 2017, Stephen and Matt continue to work together writing and performing, principally for commercial clients through their integrated composition and production studio Engine Sound.

== Style ==
The band itself describes its style as "The Who without the deafness. Matchbox Twenty without the cross over-cheddar. Counting Crows without the Bar band factor. Wilco with hope. Radiohead without the computerized sorrow and bleeps and bloops. The Police without the 80s. Maroon 5 without Stevie Wonder."

== Members ==
Their current lineup consists of:

- Stephen O'Reilly - Vocals, guitar, principal songwriter.
- Matt Anthony - Lead guitar.
- David Femia - Drums.

== Other Members ==
- Bassist Rod Quevedo, has worked on-and-off with the group.
- Aron Katz was the bassist for the group c. 1998–2000.
- Joe Chapman was the drummer for the group c. 1998–2000.

== Discography ==
- Getawayland (November 1, 1999)
- Back in the Bottle (June 1, 2000)
- Buddy (February 4, 2003)
- Shiner
- Marathon (July 6, 2005)
