= Kait Borsay =

British actress

Kait Borsay (born 31 July 1978) is a British voice over artist, television presenter and freelance news reporter known for a variety of programmes, including the phone-in quiz on morning television: Quiz Call from 2005 to 2007. She presents on Football365. She was a voice of The Memory Maze on David Grifhorst's The Exit List.

She presents an evening slot on the digital station Times Radio from Monday to Thursday.

Borsay has worked for Sky News, Channel 4 and The Daily Telegraph. She is also the co-founder of the podcast The Offside Rule.
