= Southampton General Hospital =

Teaching hospital in Southampton, Hampshire, England

- University Hospital Southampton NHS Foundation Trust
- The front of Southampton General Hospital, showing from left to right the North Wing, Centre Block, and West Wing

- Shown in Hampshire

Geography
- Location: Southampton, Hampshire, England
- Coordinates: 50.933°N 1.434°W

Organisation
- Care system: National Health Service
- Type: Teaching
- Affiliated university: University of Southampton School of Medicine

Services
- Emergency department: Major Trauma Centre – (Adult and Children)
- Beds: 1,362

History
- Founded: 1900

Links
- Website: www.uhs.nhs.uk/for-visitors/southampton-general-hospital

Southampton General Hospital (informally known as the General Hospital or The General) is a major tertiary teaching hospital in Southampton, Hampshire, England run by University Hospital Southampton NHS Foundation Trust. Founded in 1900, it is one of the UK's largest teaching hospitals and is the principal teaching hospital for the University of Southampton School of Medicine. The hospital is one of the few major trauma centres in the UK providing care for both adult and paediatric patients.

== History ==
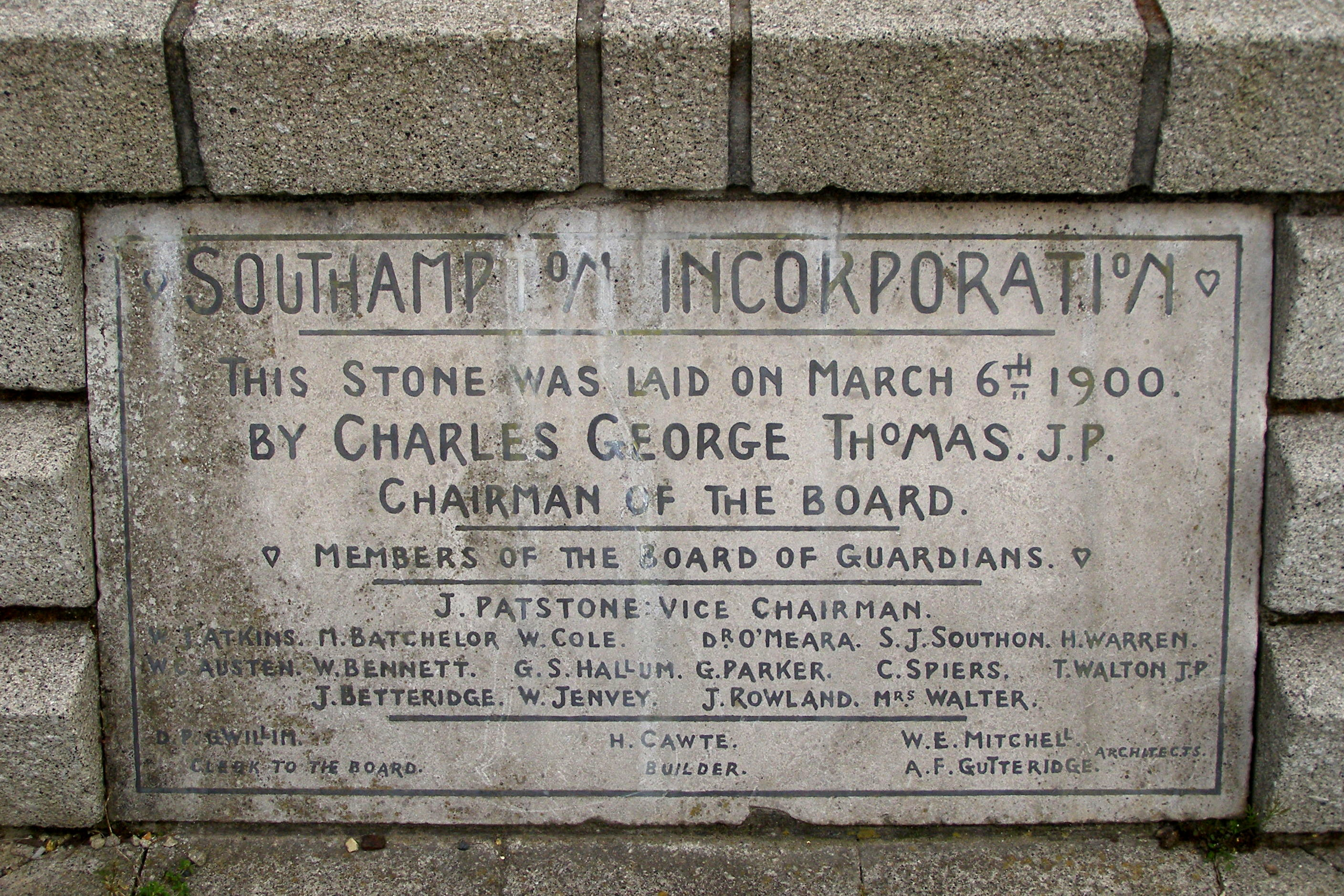
Removed from the original building during demolition work in 1985, the foundation stone can now be seen outside the main entrance

The hospital was founded in 1900 as the Southampton Union Infirmary in Shirley Warren, Southampton, to replace hospital beds previously provided at the workhouse infirmary in St Mary's, Southampton. The Royal South Hampshire Hospital was the voluntary hospital, founded in 1835 in the city. The initial 35-acre (14 ha) site cost the Poor Law Guardians £8,200, and the foundation stone was laid on 31 March 1900. The original building, housing 289 beds, cost £64,800 to construct; it has since been demolished.

Southampton Borough Council took responsibility for the hospital in 1929, expanding the number of beds to 431. At this stage, the hospital became known as the Borough Hospital. When the National Health Service came into being in 1948, the hospital took its present name.

The Wessex Neurological Unit opened on the site in 1965, and the East Wing was constructed in 1974, providing 450 additional beds, a new Accident and Emergency Department, and a children's unit. Three years later, the Centre Block was built, which still provides the main entrance to the hospital. The 7-level Centre Block cost over £9 million to construct.

Former Prime Minister, Rishi Sunak, was born in the hospital on 12 May 1980.

In 1983, the £10 million West Wing was constructed, adding 472 beds to the hospital; this was followed a year later by installation of the Wessex Body Scanner at a cost of £1.5 million.

In July 2006, a new cardiac centre was opened, together with accommodation for relatives of cardiac patients. In September 2006 the Steve Mills Stem Cell Laboratory, which had been established by a charity created by Southampton F.C. footballer Steve Mills, moved from the Royal South Hants Hospital to a new location at Southampton General Hospital, and was officially opened on 27 September 2006 by Steve's widow Jo and former Southampton footballer and manager, Alan Ball.

In autumn 2016 the hospital was upgraded to become an adult and paediatric Major Trauma Centre (MTC) under the NHS plans for Regional Trauma Networks. It was one of a small number of accident and emergency departments to benefit from Pearson Lloyd's redesign – 'A Better A&E' – which reduced aggression against hospital staff by 50 per cent. A system of environmental signage was introduced providing location-specific information for patients. Screens were installed providing live information about how many cases were being handled and the current status of the accident and emergency department.

== Controversy ==
=== Ashya King ===
In August 2014, Brett and Naghemeh King took their 5-year-old son Ashya from the hospital, where he was being treated for medulloblastoma, without doctor's knowledge. Brett King claimed this was in order to avoid the proposed treatment of chemotherapy and photon beam radiation therapy which he feared would result in brain damage to Ashya. The family's preferred treatment was proton beam therapy which was at the time unavailable in the United Kingdom except through an NHS overseas referral programme to fund treatment in America or Europe for specific indications. Although clinicians at Southampton felt proton beam therapy would not be beneficial in this case, it was discussed with the Kings and referred to the Proton Clinical Reference Panel although medulloblastoma is not an approved diagnosis to qualify for the overseas programme.

The Kings were keen to arrange proton beam therapy at a hospital in Prague. When the parents asked what would happen if they refused any kind of treatment, they were told the hospital could seek an emergency protection order. When the child subsequently went missing the hospital informed the police and the CPS issued a warrant for the arrest of the parents. Once it was revealed that the child had left the country, extradition back to the UK was also sought. The family were eventually located in Spain, where the parents were arrested and child put in a high dependency ward in a hospital in Málaga. David Cameron, the prime minister, called for "an urgent outbreak of common sense".

Ashya began proton beam therapy at the Proton Therapy Centre in Prague on 15 September. In late September NHS England agreed to fund the cost of the proton therapy treatment. NHS England had been told by the European Court of Justice to fund treatment abroad in previous cases. In March 2015 the King family announced that the treatment appeared to have been successful and Ashya's most recent scan showed no sign of the tumour.

=== Burger King ===
There had been a Burger King outlet in the foyer of the hospital since 1997. In November 2014 the Trust announced that they would not be renewing its lease due to expire in 2016 – because it no longer fits with the "healthcare environment" it is trying to create in its main reception area. Hampshire GP Dr Hilary Jones approved and said that in the grip of an obesity problem in the UK, hospitals should be setting a good example to patients. However some patients started a petition against this decision on the basis that hospital food was "of a poor standard. Burger King seems to have a much higher quality of food that's cooked fresh and to order."

A hospital spokesman responded: "The trust, as with all NHS hospitals, is regularly assessed by a variety of independent bodies on all aspects of care, including the quality of patient food. In the most recent of these inspections, the trust scored highly on food quality (92%) according to panel members from the national patient-led assessment team and fully compliant with all of the Care Quality Commission's essential standards, which incorporate quality of food and drink." The fast food outlet was replaced by a Marks & Spencer shop and cafe and a Subway franchise as part of a £2.5m redevelopment which began in mid-2015.

== Media coverage ==
The hospital was the location for the daytime TV fly-on-the-wall documentary series, The General, and its successor, City Hospital, as well as the ITV documentary series Trauma: Level One. The neighbouring Princess Anne Hospital was the setting of the first two series of Channel 4's One Born Every Minute. Broadcast in 2024, the sixth series of BBC Two's Surgeons: At the Edge of Life was filmed at the hospital, highlighting some of the diverse range of surgeries that take place there.

== Notable alumni ==
- Edith Maud Lyle (1879–1965), ARRC, RRC. Lyle trained at Shirley Warren Infirmary, Southampton from 1905 to 1908, and then went into military nursing, working for Queen Alexandra's Military Families Service. She rose to the rank of acting matron in the Territorial Force Nursing Service, from 1915-1917, and was promoted substantively in 1933 in the Queen Alexandra's Imperial Military Nursing Service. Lyle served in France during the First World War, and was matron in charge of a hospital ship St David, and was mentioned in despatches. Between the wars she served in Egypt, and with the army of occupation in the Rhine, Germany. Lyle retired in 1934/6, but volunteered to serve again in 1939 and ran a welfare centre in Bordon, Hampshire. She was a founding member of the College of Nursing (later Royal College of Nursing), a registered Midwife, and midwifery teacher for the Central Midwives Board.

== See also ==
- List of NHS trusts
