= Royal South Hants Hospital =

- NHS Property Services
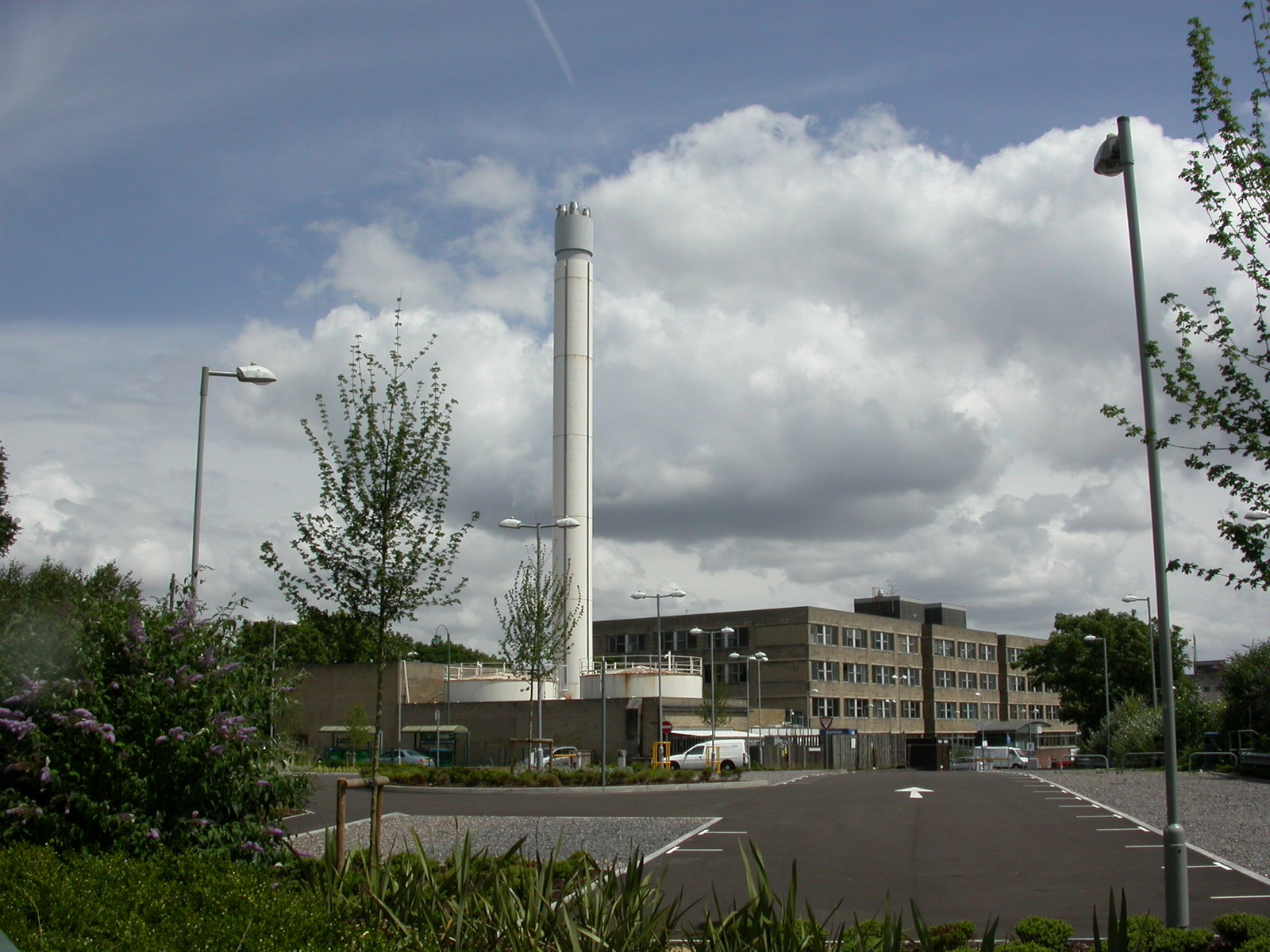
- Royal South Hants Hospital

- Shown in Southampton

Geography
- Location: Bevois Valley, Southampton, England, United Kingdom
- Coordinates: 50°54′45″N 1°23′48″W

Organisation
- Care system: Public NHS
- Type: Community hospital
- Affiliated university: University of Southampton

Services
- Emergency department: No Accident & Emergency
- Beds: 332 (originally)

History
- Founded: 1835

Links
- Website: www.royalsouthhantshospital.nhs.uk
- Lists: Hospitals in England

The Royal South Hants Hospital, known locally as "The RSH", is a community hospital in Southampton. It is managed by NHS Property Services.

== History ==
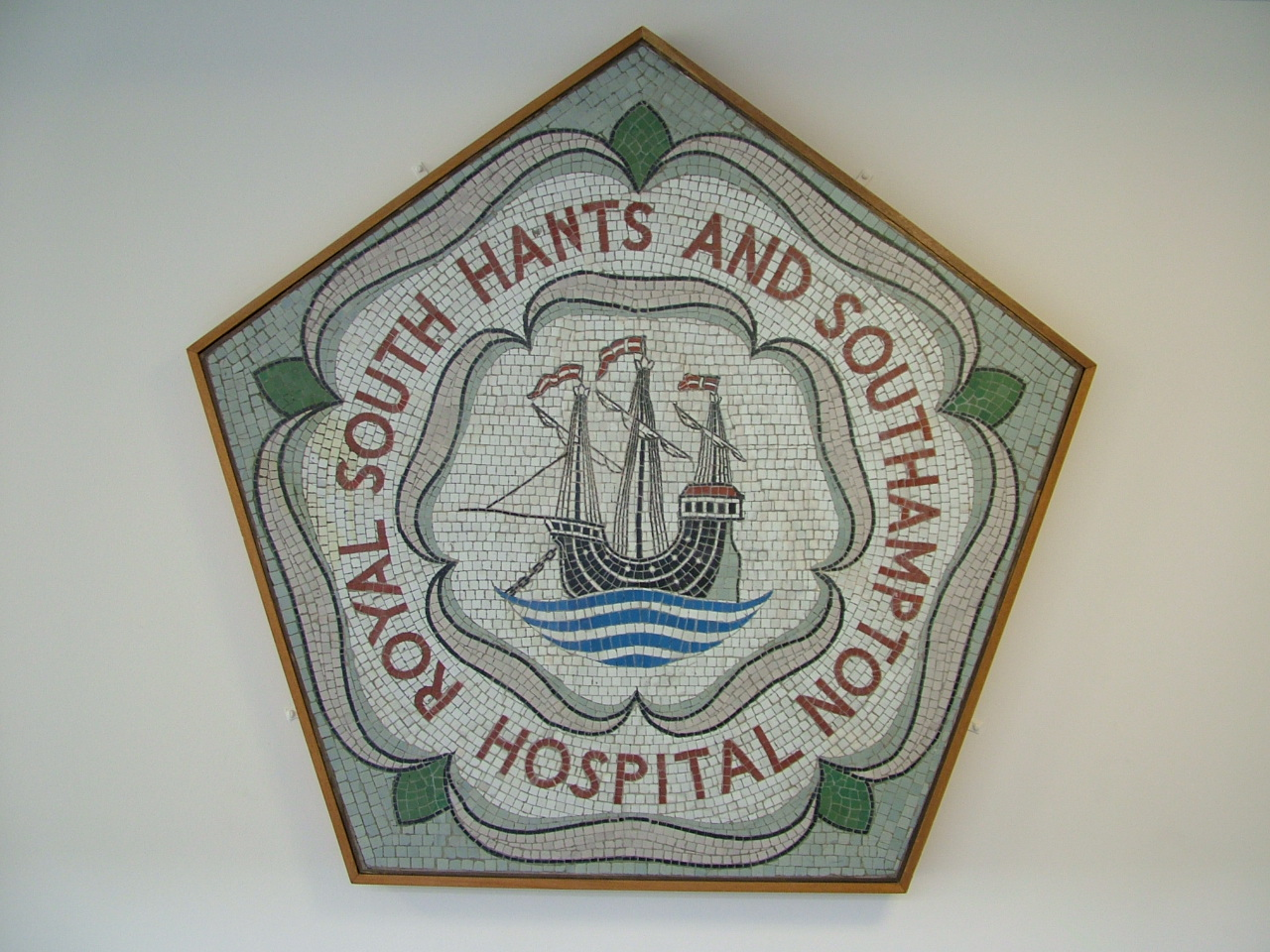
Mosaic at the hospital

The hospital was founded as the Royal South Hampshire Infirmary in 1835 and moved into its first premises in St Mary Street in 1838. It was initially a Voluntary hospital.

The foundation stone for new premises in Fanshawe Street was laid on 10 July 1843. The hospital opened there in 1844. Joseph and William Bullar, doctors and brothers of children’s author Anne Bullar, funded additional wards for the hospital. These wards, named the Bullar Wards, were completed in 1851. The Eyre Crabbe Wing, located on the east side of the site, was completed in 1868.

In 1896, another new wing, containing a further two wards and some operating theatres, was started, as well as some cottages to house patients with infectious diseases and a mortuary. This new wing was officially opened by Princess Henry of Battenberg on 7 February 1900 and named the Victoria Jubilee Wing.

During World War II, Broadlands, the country home of Lord Mountbatten, was used as an annexe for the hospital.

The hospital joined the National Health Service in 1948. As part of a transfer of mental health services from Knowle Hospital, a psychiatry block was completed in 1979. The block closed in 2009.

On 31 March 2007 management of the hospital was passed to Southampton City Primary Care Trust with several services transferring to Southampton General Hospital and the Princess Anne Hospital. In 2010 a new adult mental health unit called Antelope House was opened on the former Antelope Ground, housing 50 acute beds and 12 psychiatric intensive care beds.

The hospital is heated as part of the Southampton District Energy Scheme network.

== Chapel ==
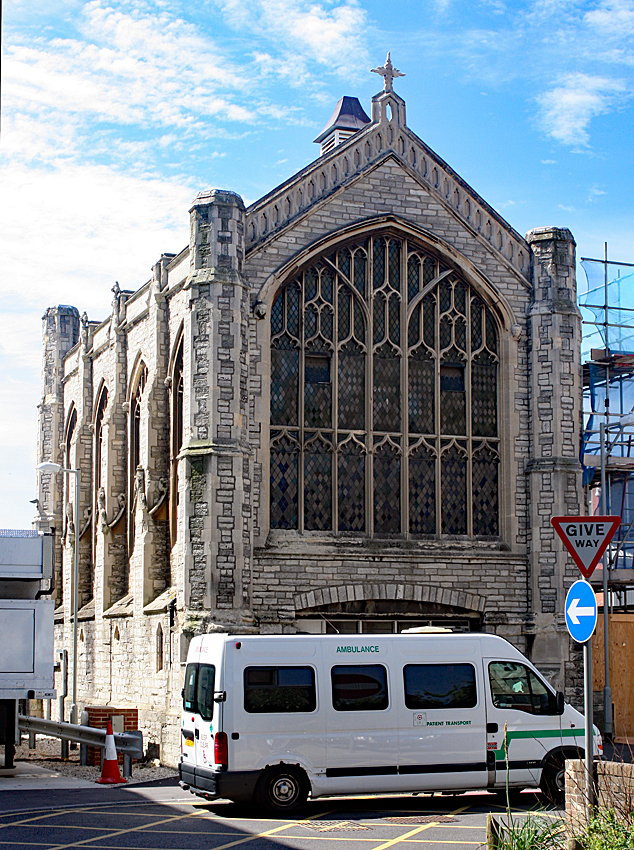
Royal South Hants Hospital chapel

St Paul's Chapel was completed in 1857. The chapel fell out of use in 1992. The Chapel is a Grade II listed building, as of 1981.

== See also ==
- List of hospitals in England
