= Dom on the Spot =

- Genre: Factual
- Presented by: Dominic Littlewood
- Country of origin: United Kingdom
- Original language: English
- No. of seasons: 3
- No. of episodes: 34

Production
- Executive producers: Rachel Innes-Lumsden; Becky Clarke
- Producers: Mona Hamed; Steven Grogan
- Running time: 45 minutes
- Production company: Twofour

Original release
- Network: BBC One
- Release: 5 September 2016 – 14 September 2018

Dom on the Spot was a British factual documentary series hosted by Dom Littlewood produced by Twofour for BBC One about fixed penalty notices, also known as on the spot fines. The series began on 5 September 2016, and a second series aired in 2017.

== Episodes ==
Series	Episodes	Originally released	
Series	Episodes	First released	Last released
1	15	5 September 2016	23 September 2016
2	15	4 September 2017	22 September 2017
3	10	3 September 2018	14 September 2018
