= Anne Bullar =

English writer (b. 1812, d. 1856)

- Born: 30 December 1812; Southampton, England
- Died: 29 June 1856 (aged 43); Alton, England
- Occupation: Writer
- Years active: 1837–1856

Anne Bullar (30 December 1812 – 29 June 1856) was an English author of educational texts for children. Her books were highly regarded and in great demand at schools in her time.

== Early life ==
Anne Bullar was born in Southampton, Hampshire on 30 December 1812, as the fifth of the six surviving children of John Bullar, a schoolmaster and deacon in the Congregationalist church, and his wife Susannah, née Whatman. Little is known of her life or education, although the family was well-educated. Her brothers became solicitors and doctors.

== Career ==
Anne Bullar wrote at least six books, the first of which, Elements of Practical Knowledge or The Young Inquirer Answered, appeared by 1837, before she had turned 25. They were published anonymously in her lifetime, but appeared in her publisher John Van Voorst's catalogues under her name after her death. They were reviewed in journals intended for readers in Britain's empire and armed services. Several were reprinted many times.

The preface to Elements of Practical Knowledge describes the compiler as "the father (and instructor) of a family". It is not known whether Miss Bullar had compiled her father's questions and answers or taken on a male persona for publicity reasons. The author's set out to provide intelligible and correct information and assist those who had difficulty in answering children's questions. A second edition was published to meet demand, although one educator of the time disputed whether the knowledge was in fact "practical" in any way.

Domestic Scenes in Greenland and Iceland, her second book, appeared in 1844. It was judged by one reviewer to be "written in a very attractive style, and well calculated to excite a desire for further information." Another thought there was "nothing so well calculated to give children a correct notice of the countries". A recent, 2002 history of the Victorians' fascination with the Vikings takes a more critical view, summing it up as "a stodgy digest", "a pot-pourri of information", with "stern, no nonsense judgements: [such as]... 'wicked' ... 'cruel' ... 'silly falsehoods'". However, although Miss Bullar decried Greenlander traditions as "foolish", she continued, "perhaps if [Greenlanders] were to come to England, they might think some of our customs as silly, and as unbecoming as we think this of theirs." In a time where foreign cultures were often characterized as "savage" or "unenlightened", Miss Bullar was more hesitant to judge the customs of other cultures, and seems to have been an early proponent of what has come to be called cultural relativism.

Like her brother John Jr, Miss Bullar was also a sanitary reformer. Her third book, Every-day wonders; or, facts in physiology which all should know, stressed the importance of clean air, healthy food, posture, exercise, bathing, and dental care. It also stated that disabilities such as blindness and deafness did not detract inherently from someone's intelligence, giving Laura Bridgman as an example, and promoted adaptive accommodations such as sign language and the manual alphabet.

Her fourth book, a history of England before the Norman Conquest, also received favourable reviews. One thought it "comprehensive and well-compiled", so that through "the excellence of the descriptions... this important history may thus be acquired with greater ease and advantage." Another recommended it as "compendious... written in a plain and popular style, and well adapted for the instruction of the young". It was not universally acclaimed, however, with one reviewer finding it "too detached and disconnected" for its intended young readers.

A Sunday book for the young; or, habits of patriarchal times in the East was the only book of hers with a religious theme. Intended to "explain... manners and customs... which sorely puzzle juvenile readers of the scriptures," it was judged "a very pretty little book", "extremely good... [and] will be a favourite with children."

Her second book on the subject of physiology was published posthumously by a different publisher, Jarrold & Sons, for the Ladies’ Sanitary Association. It appears to be a revision of Every-day wonders; or, facts in physiology which all should know, published twelve years earlier. While explaining the facts of physiology in language which the young would easily understand, she attributes these "Every-day wonders" to God, for example: "In this way God has so wonderfully contrived that the good and the bad blood should not be mixed." This aspect received approbation at the time from those who thought "more means should be afforded for giving the children easy lessons in natural theology, showing them the evidences of the skill, power, and above all of the benevolence of the Deity, which were to be seen in the creation and government of the world."

Her books are early examples of writing specifically for the young and exhibit an understanding of developmental psychology. In them Bullar often takes care to choose analogies that a young person will understand and use language appropriate for them. Her comparison of the body's nervous system and the electric telegraph was approved in A study of the history of modern insomnia (2014), as "allowing anatomical fundamentals to be conveyed even in a children's book".

== Personal life ==
During the 1840s, Bullar worked to raise money for the new Royal South Hants Infirmary. She died on 29 June 1856, aged 43, and was buried at St Nicolas's Anglican Church, North Stoneham.

== Selected works ==
Six books are attributed to Bullar. Only one appeared under her own name during her life. After her death, they appeared under her name in her publisher's catalogues. It is unknown whether the illustrations were hers or by an illustrator.

- 1837: Elements of Practical Knowledge or The Young Inquirer Answered. London, John van Voorst. Published anonymously during her life; 2nd edition published under her name.
- 1844: Domestic Scenes in Greenland and Iceland. London, John van Voorst. Published anonymously during her life; 2nd edition published under her name.
- 1850: Every-day wonders; or, facts in physiology which all should know. London, John van Voorst. Published anonymously.
- 1851: England before the Norman Conquest. London, John van Voorst. Published anonymously during her life.
- 1855: A Sunday book for the young; or, habits of patriarchal times in the East. London, John van Voorst. Published anonymously during her life.
- 1862: Every-day wonders of bodily life, essential to be known for health and comfort. London, Jarrold and Sons. Published posthumously under her own name.
