= Food Inspectors =

- Genre: Investigative Journalism; Food
- Presented by: Chris Hollins; Matt Allwright; Gaby Roslin (2014)
- Country of origin: United Kingdom
- Original language: English
- No. of series: 3
- No. of episodes: 12

Production
- Running time: 60 minutes

Original release
- Network: BBC One
- Release: 29 February 2012 – 5 June 2014

Food Inspectors is a BBC television series that investigates the health and hygiene surrounding 'food'. The show, which is a spin-off from Watchdog began airing in February 2012, is presented by Chris Hollins and Matt Allwright of Watchdog and in 2014, Gaby Roslin joined the presenting team.

== Series overview ==
| Series | Episodes | Originally aired | |
| Series | Episodes | Series premiere | Series finale |
|---|---|---|---|
| 1 | 4 | 29 February 2012 | 28 March 2012 |
| 2 | 4 | 9 January 2013 | 30 January 2013 |
| 3 | 4 | 15 May 2014 | 5 June 2014 |

=== Episodes ===
==== Series 1 ====
The first series consisted of four episodes, beginning on 29 February and ending on 28 March 2012 on BBC One.

| No. in series | Episode title | Original air date | Viewers (millions) |
|---|---|---|---|
| 1 | Bootleg Booze | 29 February 2012 | —N/a |
| 2 | Food Fraud | 7 March 2012 | —N/a |
| 3 | Takeaway Terrors | 14 March 2012 | —N/a |
| 4 | Infestation | 28 March 2012 | —N/a |

==== Series 2 ====
The second series ran from 9–30 January 2013 and lasted for four episodes on BBC One.

| No. in series | Original air date | Viewers (millions) |
|---|---|---|
| 1 | 9 January 2013 | 4.05 |
| 2 | 16 January 2013 | 3.93 |
| 3 | 23 January 2013 | 3.5 |
| 4 | 30 January 2013 | 3.52 |

==== Series 3 ====
The third series began airing on 15 May 2014 on BBC One. Once again the series consists of four episodes each of an hour in length.

| No. in series | Original air date | Viewers (millions) |
|---|---|---|
| 1 | 15 May 2014 | 2.9 |
| 2 | 23 May 2014 | 2.63 |
| 3 | 29 May 2014 | 2.3 |
| 4 | 5 June 2014 | 2.29 |
