= Food Poker =

- Presented by: Matt Allwright
- Narrated by: Jeni Barnett
- Country of origin: United Kingdom
- Original language: English
- No. of series: 1
- No. of episodes: 30

Production
- Running time: 45 minutes
- Production company: Optomen

Original release
- Network: BBC Two
- Release: 29 October – 7 December 2007

Food Poker is a BBC tea-time television programme which fuses traditional culinary skills with poker. It is presented by Matt Allwright and voiced over by Jeni Barnett, each episode features four chefs. It was first broadcast on BBC Two between 29 October and 7 December 2007.

== Format ==
The show involves chefs being dealt two food cards and can use up to three ingredients from five more 'shared ingredient' cards. The chefs then decide in secret what dish they will prepare and then choose either to 'pitch' their idea or 'fold', if they don't believe they can cook anything with the available ingredients. Those who pitch their ideas must do so to the Food Poker Panel, which consists of seven food experts. The panel then vote, using poker chips, for the two dishes they wish to see prepared. There are three rounds, the savoury cook-off, the sweet cook-off and the final showcase cook-off.

Once two chefs have been selected by the panel they have 20 minutes to cook their dishes, however they only have 15 minutes during the Sweet Cook-off. This time is very intense and competitive banter between chefs is commonplace. Once the chefs have cooked their dishes they are presented to the seven gourmets who then vote again for their preferred dish (no poker chips are used for this vote). Only the savoury and sweet cook-offs use this format. The showcase cook-off, which automatically features the two winners from the previous two cook-offs, has a different format.

== The Showcase Cook-off ==
In this round the finalists are presented with a single card, which all can see: this ingredient must be the central feature of their dishes. They then have a choice from an array of other ingredient cards from a large selection; once a card has been selected it is not available to the other chef. Therefore, chefs can both take the ingredients they need and/or steal ingredients which they think will be most valuable to their opponents. They then have 20 minutes to prepare their dishes. The two cooked dishes are then presented to the two losing chefs who then vote for their favourite and ultimately the winner, in the event of a tie the winner is decided by presenter, Matt Allwright.

== Regular contributing chefs ==
- Martin Blunos
- Gennaro Contaldo
- Peter Gordon
- Maria Elia
- Clauda McKenna
- Lawrence Keogh
- Allegra McEvedy
- Jun Tanaka
- Atul Kochhar
- Stuart Gillies
- Paul Rankin
- Theo Randall

== Reception ==
In a negative review, Veronica Lee of The Observer wrote, "In this new show, which looks like an undercooked version of Ready, Steady, Cook but without the wit, four chefs are dealt cards with foods and spices on them and they then 'compete' to come up with the best dish with these random ingredients. Sounds idiotic and is utterly pointless: Lord Reith must be spinning in his grave. Matt Allwright presents and at least has the good grace to look embarrassed."

The Guardian's John Robinson called the show, "Essentially Ready Steady Cook, but with a slightly bizarre light entertainment twist, this challenges not quite celebrity chefs to raise their media profiles while host Matt Allwright looks on ironically." Patricia Wynn Davies of The Daily Telegraph lauded the show, writing, "Take Britain's latest craze and weave it in with TV's love affair with food programmes and you get something that’s actually quite good fun."
