= Matt Allwright =

English television presenter and journalist

- Born: Matthew Allwright; 14 April 1970 (age 56); Wokingham, Berkshire, England
- Occupations: Television presenter, journalist
- Years active: 1996–present
- Employer(s): BBC, Channel 5
- Television: Presenting: Rogue Traders (2001—2009); Food Poker (2007); Watchdog (2009—2019); The One Show (2010—); You've Been Scammed (2011—2013); Food Inspectors (2012–2014); Fake Britain (2013—2016); Saints and Scroungers (2013—2015); Keeping Britain Safe: 24/7 (2013–2014); The Housing Enforcers (2014—2017); The Code (2016—2017); The Saturday Show (2016)
- Website: mattallwright.com

Matthew Allwright (born 14 April 1970) is an English television presenter, journalist, and musician. He has presented shows such as Watchdog, Rogue Traders, Food Inspectors, The Code, Fake Britain and The One Show for BBC One.

== Early life ==
Allwright was educated at two independent schools in Berkshire: Dolphin School in Hurst (near Reading), and Reading Blue Coat School in Sonning; followed by the University of Manchester, where he gained a degree in English.

== Career ==
In 1997, while working as a producer on BBC Radio Solent, Allwright was commissioned to report on his mother’s issue with Bounce tumble dryer sheets. He negotiated with Watchdog, and fronted the piece himself after contacting the programme. The BBC saw potential and requested Allwright present the report himself. This led to a regular reporting slot on the show. Many of his early Watchdog stints also guest-starred his mother, as a consumer commentator.

In 2001, Allwright also began presenting another programme, Rogue Traders with Dan Penteado. The show was a 30-minute undercover consumer programme in which Allwright and Penteado investigated and confronted rogue tradesmen. In 2004, Allwright hosted Brassed Off Britain, Scambusters and Fat Nation for the BBC. In 2007, he also presented Food Poker for BBC Two. In 2008, Allwright and former Watchdog presenter Anita Rani hosted a short-lived spin-off from Rogue Traders, called Rogue Restaurants. In 2009, Rogue Traders was merged with Watchdog, with Rogue Traders split into feature segments and shown throughout. Allwright also became co-host on Watchdog.

Since 2010, Allwright has guest hosted BBC One's The One Show, where he filled in for Matt Baker on numerous occasions, as well as being a regular feature reporter. Since 2011, Allwright has also hosted the BBC show You've Been Scammed. In 2012, Allwright presented ITV's primetime game show The Exit List for one series. Allwright also co-hosted the BBC One programme Food Inspectors with Chris Hollins. In 2012, Rogue Traders co-presenter Dan Penteado was dropped by the BBC following his arrest for fraud. Allwright continued to present the show, in a solo capacity.

From 2013, Allwright replaced Dominic Littlewood in presenting BBC consumer rights programmes Fake Britain and Saints and Scroungers, in 2017 Dominic Littlewood returned to presenting duties on Fake Britain and Allwright left the series. In December 2013, Allwright began co-presenting the BBC One programme Keeping Britain Safe 24/7 with Julia Bradbury.

From 1 September 2014, Allwright presented The Housing Enforcers, a daytime programme for BBC One. There were ten 45-minute episodes showing each week day for a run of two weeks. A second series was shown on the BBC in 2015 of which there were twenty 45-minute episodes. In April 2016, Allwright began presenting the BBC One daytime game show The Code which returned for a second series in March 2017.

On 4 June 2016, Allwright guest presented an episode of The Saturday Show on Channel 5 alongside Gaby Roslin. The following month he became a permanent co-presenter after Matt Barbet left the show, but the series was cancelled in October 2016.

Since 2024, Allwright has been a relief presenter on Jeremy Vine and Storm Huntley on 5. After ITN extended their deal with the broadcaster, Allwright will have his own programme in the slot beginning in January 2026.

== Personal life ==
Allwright is a patron of the Stillbirth and Neonatal Death Society (SANDS). He is also a patron of Launchpad Reading, a local charity working to prevent homelessness in Reading, and the Dorset-based Grace Secondary School Appeal. In December 2023, Allwright won £75,000 for Launchpad on the ITV show Beat The Chasers. Allwright is a follower of cricket and a supporter of Bracknell Bees ice hockey club and Liverpool Football Club.

Allwright is an aficionado of country music and plays guitar, lap and pedal steel guitars, keyboards, and sings. He writes a regular blog about his experiences learning to play the pedal steel guitar.

Allwright is married, has two children and has a miniature schnauzer called Enzo.

== Filmography ==
Television

Year	Title	Channel	Role	Notes
1997–2001	Weekend Watchdog	BBC One	Presenter	
2001–2009	Rogue Traders	BBC One	Presenter	Continued as a segment on Watchdog until 2019.
2004	Brassed Off Britain	BBC One	Presenter	
2004	Scambusters	BBC One	Presenter	
2004	Fat Nation	BBC One	Presenter	
2005	Children in Need	BBC One	Outside Presenter	
2006	Just the Two of Us	BBC One	Participant	
2007	Food Poker	BBC Two	Presenter	
2008	Rogue Restaurants	BBC One	Presenter	
2009—2019	Watchdog	BBC One	Co-presenter	
2010	The Secret Tourist	BBC One	Presenter	
2010—	The One Show	BBC One	Stand-in presenter / Watchdog presenter (since 2020)	
2011—2013	You've Been Scammed	BBC One	Presenter	
2012	The Exit List	ITV	Presenter	
2012–2014	Food Inspectors	BBC One	Co-presenter	
2013–2014	Keeping Britain Safe 24/7	BBC One	Co-presenter	
2013–2015	Saints and Scroungers	BBC One	Presenter	
2013—2016	Fake Britain	BBC One	Presenter	
2014—2017	The Housing Enforcers	BBC One	Presenter	
2016	The Saturday Show	Channel 5	Co-presenter	
2016—2017	The Code	BBC One	Presenter	
2019—2020	Britain's Housing Scandal	BBC One	Presenter	
2020	Your Money and Your Life	BBC One	Co-presenter	
2025 —	Doorbell Detectives	BBC One	Presenter	

Guest appearances

- The Wright Stuff (2006)
- Pointless Celebrities (26 May 2012, 28 May 2016)
- Hacker Time (30 July 2013)
- Holiday of My Lifetime (3 November 2014)
- The Saturday Show (23 April 2016)
- The Chase: Celebrity Special (30 October 2016)
- Debatable (4 & 5 May 2017)
- Richard Osman's House of Games (3-8 December 2018)
