= The Housing Enforcers =

- Presented by: Matt Allwright
- No. of series: 3
- No. of episodes: 95

Production
- Production company: Twofour

Original release
- Network: BBC One
- Release: 1 September 2014

The Housing Enforcers is a BBC One day-time television series that first aired on 1 September 2014. The series is hosted by presenter Matt Allwright and looks at the work of Local Authority Housing Officers who deal with disrepair and other Environmental Health related matters in the private rented housing sector in the UK. The series was commissioned by BBC Daytime Controller, Damian Kavanagh and Commissioning Editor, Lindsay Bradbury. The series was produced for the BBC by TwoFour. The executive producers for Twofour were Rachel Innes-Lumsden and Melanie Leach.

Series 1 ran for ten forty-five-minute episodes each week day for two weeks from 1 September 2014 until 12 September 2014. The series was repeated on BBC Two each week day from 29 September 2014 with a superimposed signer.

The series covered many local authorities work, including the Housing Quality Team at Sandwell Metropolitan Borough Council. Officers featured in the first series were Richard Hawkins, Royston Nicholls, Laura Mahiques and Richard Hampton.

A second series began broadcasting on 4 May 2015. It features a further twenty forty-five minute episodes. From 20 July 2015, three one-hour compilation episodes were broadcast weekly. A third series began broadcasting on 8 August 2016. It features twenty episodes, each lasting thirty minutes.
