= City Hospital (British TV series) =

British television documentary series (1998–2007)

- Genre: Medical documentary
- Presented by: See below
- Theme music composer: Bruce Hornsby
- Opening theme: "The Way It Is"
- Country of origin: United Kingdom
- Original language: English
- No. of series: 16 + 1 special
- No. of episodes: 655

Production
- Production locations: Southampton General Hospital (1998–2001); Guy's Hospital and St Thomas' Hospital (2002–2007)
- Running time: 50 minutes
- Production company: Topical Television

Original release
- Network: BBC One
- Release: 12 October 1998 – 5 January 2007

Related
- The General

City Hospital is a medical documentary television series that aired on BBC One from 12 October 1998 until 5 January 2007. It ran over sixteen series with over 360 hours of film broadcast every weekday from 10 am. It was the successor to The General and initially kept the same location and format, adding Gaby Roslin, Nick Knowles and Edwina Silver to the presenting line up.

== Format ==
City Hospital was first broadcast live from Southampton University Trust's teaching hospital, Southampton General Hospital but also featured Princess Anne Maternity Hospital. It then moved to London's flagship NHS Health Trust - Guy's Hospital and St Thomas' Hospital in 2002. The show followed real patients and staff and featured daily live-to-air footage of actual surgical operations, as they were being performed. The show's theme tune was an instrumental version of Bruce Hornsby's "The Way It Is". Both The General and City Hospital were produced by Topical Television.

== Ratings ==
A ratings success, the final series commanded a quarter of all the UK television audience at 10am every weekday - over a million viewers daily.

The programme had unprecedented BBC Audience Appreciation (AI) figures for a daytime broadcast. When viewers were asked which programme they would put at the top of all the BBC programmes they had watched that week, City Hospital consistently scored highly. During the last week of programmes, the AI figure was an almost unheard of 88%. The BBC reported: "Alongside the usual big hitters, the dramas and US imports, the daytime programme City Hospital always wins through with high AIs."

== Yvette Fielding's live proposal ==
In 1999 Yvette Fielding's boyfriend Karl Beattie, a cameraman on the show, proposed to her live on air. She accepted and the two later married.

== Presenters ==
Presenters included:

- Gaby Roslin
- Matt Baker
- Roger Black
- Yvette Fielding
- Ainsley Harriott
- Matthew Kelly
- Nick Knowles
- Andi Peters
- Nadia Sawalha
- Sian Williams

Numerous guest presenters, including celebrities, actors and musicians, made cameo appearances.

== Transmission guide ==
Filmed at Southampton General Hospital:

Series	Start date	End date	Episodes
1	12 October 1998	18 December 1998	50
2	12 April 1999	21 May 1999	28
3	6 September 1999	17 December 1999	64
4	27 March 2000	26 May 2000	42
5	4 September 2000	19 December 2000	51
6	30 April 2001	6 July 2001	46

Filmed at Guy's Hospital and St Thomas' Hospital:

Series	Start date	End date	Episodes
7	18 February 2002	28 March 2002	29
8	2 September 2002	25 October 2002	40
9	6 May 2003	4 July 2003	39
10	1 September 2003	10 October 2003	30
11	5 April 2004	28 May 2004	37
12	6 September 2004	5 November 2004	40
13	4 April 2005	27 May 2005	37
14	5 September 2005	4 November 2005	40
15	3 April 2006	26 May 2006	37
16	11 September 2006	10 November 2006	40
Winter Health Special	1 January 2007	5 January 2007	5
