= Gaby Roslin =

English television and radio presenter

- Roslin in 2024
- Born: 12 July 1964 (age 62); London, England
- Education: Guildford School of Acting
- Occupations: Broadcaster, presenter
- Years active: 1989–present
- Television: The Big Breakfast; Children in Need; Food Inspectors; Lorraine; Motormouth; The National Lottery Draws; The Saturday Show; Shop Smart: Save Money; Sport Relief's Top Dog
- Spouses: Colin Peel (m. 1995; div. 2004) David Osmon (m. 2013)
- Children: 2
- Parent: Clive Roslin

Gaby Roslin (born 12 July 1964) is an English television and radio presenter who rose to fame co-presenting Motormouth on ITV between 1989 and 1992, and The Big Breakfast on Channel 4 between 1992 and 1996. Roslin also presented the Children in Need charity telethons on the BBC between 1995 and 2004.

She presented the weekly the National Lottery Draws on Saturday evenings and co-presented the Channel 5 daytime programme The Saturday Show alongside Matt Allwright. In 2023 she became one of the regular presenters on the BBC One programme Morning Live.

== Early life ==
Roslin was born and raised in London. She is the daughter of former BBC radio announcer Clive Roslin. Her grandmother was Muriel Rosin, one of the first Jewish MPs to be elected to the Parliament of Southern Rhodesia in 1953, and the only female MP in the Federal Parliament of Rhodesia and Nyasaland. Her family is Jewish. She attended the Guildford School of Acting.

== Career ==
=== Television ===
Roslin began as a children's television presenter. She first presented Hippo on the Superchannel and then Motormouth on ITV from 1989 until 1992. At the end of that show, she was approached by Planet 24 to present their new early-morning programme The Big Breakfast alongside Chris Evans on Channel 4. Evans left the show in 1994 and Roslin continued with his replacement, Mark Little, until 1996. Following her departure, she hosted The Gaby Roslin Show for Channel 4.

Roslin presented Children in Need from 1995 until 2004. Other BBC presenting roles included The Real Holiday Show, City Hospital, Watchdog Healthcheck, Whatever You Want and A Question of TV. She was one of several presenters for the BBC's 2000 Today, a 28-hour-long programme to see in the year 2000. She was the only presenter to stay on air for the duration.

In 2003, Roslin switched networks to Five (now Channel 5) where she co-hosted The Terry and Gaby Show with Terry Wogan. The show ended after 200 episodes on 26 March 2004.

In 2004, Roslin teamed up with Terry Wogan to co-host the first edition of Eurovision – Making Your Mind Up, the revamped successor to A Song for Europe, the UK's long-running pre-selection show for the Eurovision Song Contest. In 2005, she was replaced by Natasha Kaplinsky.

She co-presented the daytime programme Solution Street with Ben Shephard. In February 2006, she took part in the BBC celebrity duet show Just the Two of Us, where she partnered ABC frontman Martin Fry.

Roslin frequently appeared on the ITV lifestyle programme This Morning as a newspaper reviewer, often starring with her former radio co-host Paul Ross.

From 2014 until 2016, she presented The National Lottery Draws live on BBC One. For three weeks in March 2014, Roslin presented a daily programme entitled Sport Relief's Top Dog on BBC Two.

In 2014, Roslin co-presented the third series of BBC One's Food Inspectors programme with Matt Allwright and Chris Hollins.

On 25 January 2015, Roslin took part in celebrity talent show Get Your Act Together. She has also been a guest presenter on the ITV Breakfast show Lorraine.

In October 2015, it was announced that Roslin would co-present Channel 5's daytime programme The Saturday Show, alongside Matt Barbet. Barbet was replaced by Matt Allwright in July 2016. In 2018, she co-presented Shop Smart: Save Money with Fiona Phillips, a series for Channel 5.

=== Stage ===
In 2004, Roslin appeared in a national tour of the Moira Buffini play Dinner. The following year she toured in a stage version of When Harry Met Sally..., and later in the year she sang and danced in the London stage production of Chicago.

=== Radio ===
Roslin sat in for Alan Carr on BBC Radio 2 on 15 and 22 August 2009 with Patrick Kielty and joined Carr to present a Christmas edition of his show on 24 December 2009. She was also a regular stand-in on BBC Radio London, covering on occasions for Vanessa Feltz and JoAnne Good. On 11 January 2010, Roslin permanently replaced Good as co-host (with Paul Ross) of the BBC London 94.9 breakfast show and remained until January 2013. She was given her own weekly Saturday show, live from noon until 2:00 pm, in January 2013. A year later, she was moved to an extended Sunday afternoon show. In September 2025, she became the host of the national BBC Local Radio Make a Difference show on Sunday afternoons. In October 2021 Roslin sat in for Chris Evans on the 'Chris Evans Breakfast Show' on Virgin Radio UK, alongside Ricky Wilson (of the Kaiser Chiefs).

In 2018 Roslin presented Gaby's Talking Pictures, a panel show for BBC Radio 4, also featuring team captains Ellie Taylor and John Thomson.

Since 2023, Roslin has been a frequent cover presenter for various shows on BBC Radio 2, including covering for Zoe Ball on The Radio 2 Breakfast Show.

In January 2025, Roslin joined Magic Radio to host a Saturday morning programme from 10am to 1pm.

== Personal life ==
Roslin married musician Colin Peel in 1995; they divorced in 2004. They have a daughter. In December 2006, Roslin had another daughter, with David Osmon. The couple became engaged in March 2012 and married in a Jewish ceremony on 22 June 2013.

== Filmography ==
Television

Year	Title	Role	Notes
	Hippo	Presenter	
1989–1992	Motormouth	Presenter	
1992–96	The Big Breakfast	Presenter	
1996	The Gaby Roslin Show	Presenter	10 episodes
1995–2004	Children in Need	Co-presenter	with Sir Terry Wogan
1997–2000	Whatever You Want	Presenter	
1998–99	City Hospital	Presenter	
2000	2000 Today	Co-presenter	UK only
2000–02	Watchdog Healthcheck	Presenter	
2002	Breakfast	Reporter	
2003–04	The Terry and Gaby Show	Co-presenter	
2004	Eurovision: Making Your Mind Up	Presenter	
2005	Solution Street	Co-presenter	
2006	Just the Two of Us	Contestant	
2010	Missing (2009 TV series)	Actress	
2014–16	The National Lottery Draws	Presenter	
2014	Sport Relief's Top Dog	Presenter	1 series
2014	Food Inspectors	Presenter	Series 3 only
2014	The BBC Children in Need Sewing Bee	Contestant	
2015	Get Your Act Together	Contestant	
2015–16	Lorraine	Deputy presenter	80 episodes
2015–16	The Saturday Show	Co-presenter	46 episodes
2018—	Shop Smart: Save Money	Co-presenter	1 series
2022	The Great Christmas Bake Off!	Contestant	1 episode
2023–present	Morning Live	Stand-in presenter	
2024–	Shop Smart, Save Money	Co-presenter	Replaced Angellica Bell
2026	The Joys of Pets	Presenter	Also features vet Dr Bolu Eso
