= My Little Eye =

- UK release poster
- Directed by: Marc Evans
- Written by: David Hilton; James Watkins
- Produced by: Alan Greenspan; Jane Villiers; David Hilton; Jon Finn
- Starring: Sean Cw Johnson; Kris Lemche; Stephen O'Reilly; Laura Regan; Jennifer Sky; Bradley Cooper
- Cinematography: Hubert Taczanowski
- Edited by: Marguerite Arnold
- Music by: Bias
- Production companies: Universal Pictures; Studio Canal; Working Title Films; WT^{2} Productions
- Distributed by: Momentum Pictures (United Kingdom); Focus Features (United States); Mars Distribution (France); Alliance Atlantis (Canada); United International Pictures (international)
- Release dates: 10 September 2002 (TIFF); 4 October 2002 (United Kingdom); 27 April 2004 (United States)
- Running time: 95 minutes
- Countries: United Kingdom; United States; France; Canada
- Language: English
- Budget: $3 million
- Box office: $6,753,562

My Little Eye is a 2002 horror film directed by Marc Evans about five adults who agree to spend six months together in an isolated mansion while being filmed at all times. The idea for the film came from reality television shows such as Big Brother. The title refers to the guessing game I spy.

== Plot ==
Five contestants, Matt, Emma, Charlie, Danny and Rex, agree to take part in a reality webcast, where they must spend six months in a house to win $1 million. If anyone leaves, then no one wins the money. Nearing the end of the six months, tension between the contestants rises after Emma finds strange messages she believes are from a man from her past and the food packages arrive containing a letter that claims Danny's grandfather has died, and a gun with five bullets.

One night, a man named Travis Patterson arrives, claiming he is lost in the woods and that his GPS has died. Despite claiming to be an internet programmer, he claims to not recognize any of the contestants or ever having heard of the show. Later that night, Travis has sex with Charlie, and then secretly talks directly into a camera, to communicate with whoever is watching them. The next morning, Travis leaves and Danny discovers his backpack outside covered in blood and shredded to pieces. The contestants assume he was attacked by an animal but Rex believes Travis works for the people running their show and that it is all a trick to make them leave the house and forfeit the prize money.

Emma discovers her underwear among Danny's belongings and confronts him, unaware that Travis planted them there the previous night. Danny denies stealing them. He attempts to make peace by giving her a crudely carved wooden cat, which Emma and Charlie ridicule, while Danny overhears.

The next morning, the group finds Danny has committed suicide by hanging himself from the staircase balcony with a rope. The guests finally decide to leave, but after being unable to contact anyone via radio, decide to wait until the next morning. Rex uses the GPS unit from Travis' bag and his laptop to gain access to the internet to find out more about the show but is unable to find any evidence of their show online.

Rex is only able to find a heavily encrypted beta site, that requires a $50,000 fee to access, and displays a web page with their pictures and betting odds. The group decides they will leave the next morning, though Rex and Emma go up to the roof to set off a flare. While Charlie and Matt remain in the house, Matt asks a camera if he should kill her, before suffocating her with a plastic bag.

Later, while Emma is sleeping, Rex comes downstairs and is decapitated with an axe by Matt. Matt awakens Emma and brings her up to the attic, telling her he is being chased and the others are dead. He then makes advances on Emma, who refuses, and attempts to rape her. She stabs him in the back and runs off.

Emma runs outside and finds a police officer, who handcuffs her inside the car and enters the house. An injured Matt then crawls out, begging the cop to let him kill Emma, since he spent six months in the house with her. Realizing they are working together, Emma escapes the car and tries to run but is shot in the back with a rifle by the cop.

Matt and the cop sit in the kitchen, discussing the setup they created with Travis for their high paying clients who want to witness the murders. When the cop says there are always "five suckers" to play the game with, Matt corrects him to four, and is then shot in the head. The cop then leaves, talking to Travis over the radio, while Emma is locked in a small room, unable to escape. As she collapses screaming, the cameras filming all shut off, one by one.

== Cast ==
- Sean Cw Johnson as Matt
- Kris Lemche as Rex
- Stephen O'Reilly as Danny
- Laura Regan as Emma
- Jennifer Sky as Charlie
- Nick Mennell as The Cop/Pete
- Bradley Cooper as Travis Patterson

== Home media ==
My Little Eye was released on DVD from Universal Pictures with most of the special features available on the Region 2 Special Edition, including a filmmakers' commentary and deleted scenes. There is an audio mode "Conversations of the Company (Eavesdropping Audio Track)" which allows the viewer to listen to the radio conversations between the members of the company: Travis and "the cop". However, during this mode, the viewer cannot hear all of the dialogue of the cast in the scene. A UK release contains a 'Special Mode' where viewers see the film from the perspective of an internet subscriber, and more extra features become unlocked as the film goes on. The viewer can watch other things going on in 'the house' in real time to the film's events.

== Reception ==
The film received generally positive reviews and holds 68% on Rotten Tomatoes based on 22 reviews.

== See also ==
- List of films featuring surveillance
