= Rogue Traders (TV programme) =

British television programme (2001–2009)

- Presenters Matt Allwright and Dan Penteado
- Genre: Consumer
- Presented by: Matt Allwright; Dan Penteado (2001–2012)
- Narrated by: Matt Allwright
- Country of origin: United Kingdom
- Original language: English

Production
- Running time: 30–60 minutes (Original format); 15-20 minutes (segment format within Watchdog)

Original release
- Network: BBC One
- Release: 3 May 2001 – 26 March 2009

Related
- Watchdog (1980–2019); Rogue Restaurants (2008)

Rogue Traders is a BBC One investigative/undercover consumer affairs television programme starring Matt Allwright, an investigative journalist, and Dan Penteado, a private investigator and Allwright's co-host. The show focuses on investigating and exposing the dubious work practices of tradespeople and businesses who have received complaints against them from their customers, often through the use of hidden cameras and rigged situations, sometimes sending members of the show's research team undercover to secretly record any training methods taught to a business' employees that is suspicious or unethical.

The programme ran for nine series between 2001 and 2009, before it was decided to incorporate Rogue Traders' format as a multi-part segment for the long-running consumer series Watchdog; the segment retained the show's name after its merger in 2009. In 2012, Penteado was removed from the show, after he was jailed for benefit fraud.

== Format ==
For each episode of Rogue Traders, Allwright seeks to expose individuals who have come to the attention of the research team, usually for one or several reasons, including being unethical with sales, aggressively pursuing a customer for money, creating unnecessary work, selling something that is not wanted, or committing a criminal offence/breaking the law during a job. Such individuals are usually found through customers writing to the programme outside of filming/broadcast, who were unsatisfied by the individual's work, behaviour or sales techniques, made complaints against them that they refused to deal with, or felt cheated by the amount they paid out, whereupon the programme's researchers will investigate the trader further. While the show usually has an improvised and humorous feel to each episode, per the script created by Allwright, the consumer investigative nature of the programme ensures that each trader's dubious nature is looked into seriously. In addition, the show often pursues a trader to acquire evidence that supports the complaints their customers make, to which the show uses an occasional catchphrase – "We never give up."

The general format of each episode is that Allwright will usually introduce viewers to the rogue trader(s) they are seeking to expose, revealing brief details about the issues they have caused, and highlighting the business that they run; for the latter, the show has generated a catchphrase, in which the host occasionally advises viewers that the business is "not to be confused with any other companies of the same name" or any other variation of it. He will then meet with the trader's customers who complained about them and wrote to the programme's research team with their experiences, through which Allwright will usually ask them what the trader was like, what they did, and how the customer felt about the whole experience. In some cases, the programme is sometimes contacted by a former associate of a business the programme is investigating, who can provide an inside look at how they perform and the associate's thoughts on such behaviour.

After hearing enough about the trader, the next step focuses on filming the rogue trader in the act. How this is done varies, depending on the work that the rogue trader is involved in, but in all cases, hidden cameras are used to record everything, while either a trade or legal expert is brought in to view the recorded footage and provide their opinions, thoughts and criticism over what they see being done, including if they suspect a trader is lying to a customer about something that is untrue, questioning what a trader is doing on a job, revealing what something should really cost that a trader is overpricing, and if a trader is doing something illegal that they shouldn't be doing. The following lists how certain types of traders are filmed secretly to provide evidence of dubious work practices:

- DIY Tradespeople – For traders who are involved in DIY work, such as gas fitters and roofers, a house is arranged by the production team, rigged with hidden cameras and occupied by a "customer", who is in reality an actor, that the trader will visit. In most cases of this format, before the trader is called over to the house, a DIY expert recruited to comment about the trader's work practices, will set up a simple, basic fault that can occur, which the customer will point out and request to have fixed. After the trader has completed the job and left, regardless of the length of time that is taken and whether they did it alone or with others that they employ, both the expert and Allwright will then inspect the trader's work to determine its quality and value for money, along with what work shouldn't have been done, and the expert's general opinion on the trader's performance. This format is sometimes repeated a second time, to determine how they perform when faced with a similar issue or a different fault.
- Salespeople – For traders who operate a business that sends out salespeople, the production team use two arrangements of filming. The first operates on a similar principle as above, in which a house is rigged with hidden cameras and occupied by an elderly customer, portrayed by an actor. The customer will then call over a salesperson from the business to talk about a product, with the cameras recording what the salesperson does. A legal/commercial expert will usually comment on the techniques used by the salesperson, including "hard-selling", the price strategy used with the customer, and other behaviours that they should be adhering to or shouldn't be using. The second involves a member or members of the research team going undercover at the business being investigated on the pretense of seeking to work with them. These members are rigged with a hidden camera in their clothing to record the training they receive, and question the people working in the company on how they sell a product to customers.
- Services and Goods – These situations can vary, depending on what the trader is involved in, though the production team will usually send out researchers and actors to pose as customers, and will usually procure a trader's services/goods multiple times:
  - If the trader is a mechanic or runs a garage, the mechanical expert recruited by the production team will usually set up a fault on a car, arranged for the researchers, that the trader or their garage must fix. After the car has been serviced, the expert examines it, to determine the quality of the work performed, how safe the car is, and whether it was value for money.
  - If the trader sells goods, these will be bought and then examined by an expert to determine their quality and true value. For example, if the trader is a second-hand car dealer, the vehicle is purchased and then checked to see if it is roadworthy, has valid documentation, and is safe for the driver and passengers.
  - If the trader is involved in rubbish collection, the production team rig the location of the job with an actor portraying the customer and a set of hidden cameras, while marking the rubbish to be collected with an identifiable substance and concealing a tracker amongst it. Once the rubbish is collected, the team follow the tracker from a discrete distance, until it stops moving for a reasonable period of time, and then inspect the site that the rubbish has been dumped at, identifying it as their rubbish by the substance they marked it with.

In all cases, once enough evidence of a trader's practices, ethics, and other misdemeanors are acquired via hidden cameras, Allwright will make arrangements to interview the trader and question them on what they do, and why they behave in a way that can leave customers cheated, unhappy, and shocked. In some cases, if the trader had appeared in an earlier episode for similar behaviour, the host will also question them on why they are still trading in the same manner as before. How the host arranges the interview, is done in one of two ways – for DIY traders, Allwright will usually set up a sting, in which the trader is called out to deal with a job, only to be ambushed by the host, who during the fourth and fifth series, wore a disguise and did not break character until after a suitable amount of time passed. For most others, Allwright will usually visit the place they work from and attempt to interview them there. In most cases, the trader(s) will avoid answering questions, sometimes swearing, locking themselves away in a place they cannot be reached by the host, or trying to give vague, unrelated answers while walking/driving away. In some cases, Allwright manages to interview them before they leave or he and his camera crew are asked to leave. In rare cases, traders may aggressively force the host and his camera team to leave, even intimidating them with the support of close friends.

An episode then ends with Allwright warning customers about trading with the rogue trader, whereupon he narrates a response to viewers, made by the trader in relation to the show's investigations and the allegations of their practices, actions and attitude to customers.

For some episodes, usually the last in the series, the show looks back at some of the traders they featured and reveals what happened to them after the episode they featured in had ended. In these episodes, footage from a trader's episode is used to remind viewers of how they performed and the opinions of their customers who complained about them and the experts who observed their work practices. New footage is then shown of what occurred afterwards with the trader, which include interviews with customers who had dealings with the trader and who decided to come forth on to the programme about their experience, and with investigators (mainly from Trading Standards) who investigated the trader, and found enough evidence to prosecute them for unethical, aggressive and illegal business conduct. For the latter, where the trader's trial took place, is mentioned by the host, who also states the sentence the trader received.

== Rogue Restaurants ==
On 2 August 2008, a six-part spin-off show was launched called Rogue Restaurants, where Matt Allwright and Anita Rani investigate and secretly film restaurants across the UK in order to expose illegal and dangerous practices by restaurant managers and staff. They were accompanied by Dr Lisa Ackerley, a Food Safety Expert who was able to give an expert opinion to Matt and Anita.

== Merger with Watchdog ==
On 10 May 2009, a plan was announced by the BBC to relaunch Watchdog; as part of the plans for the relaunch, it was decided that to extend the length of each episode to one hour, the format of Rogue Traders would be merged into the consumer programme, with both Allwright and Penteado retained to present it under the same name, with the former given the bonus of being a host alongside Anne Robinson and Anita Rani. As part of the arrangement, the segment was split into three parts with Allwright introducing each part from a section of Watchdog's new studio, and now featured a "rogues" gallery, to which he would put up pictures of the rogue traders he featured on the programme.

== Arrest of Dan Penteado ==
On 13 June 2012, Dan Penteado was due in court to face charges of illegally claiming housing and council tax benefit after a council benefit officer had recognised Penteado on television and matched his name to their records. He failed to appear in court, and a warrant for his arrest was issued. He later appeared in Bournemouth Magistrates' Court on 25 June, where his solicitor, Terrence Scanlan argued the fraud took place between 2008 and 2012 when he was working part-time for the BBC and had made the "very poor judgement not to interrupt the flow of housing benefit". He admitted eight offences of dishonestly or knowingly claiming housing and council tax benefits totalling more than £24,000, while he had been paid more than £56,000 for his work on Rogue Traders from 2008 to 2011 and was sentenced to 12 weeks in prison on 17 July 2012. The council bringing the case to court sought to recover the overpayments and was successful, with Penteado having subsequently repaid £210 of this by July.
