= Beat the Burglar =

British television series

Beat the Burglar is a BBC television programme presented by Dominic Littlewood, that used ex-professional burglar Mike Fraser to break into people's homes with their permission to show how vulnerable they can be. Forensic teams then harvested the evidence for analysis by experts before giving the homeowners a home security makeover.

Firstly, Mike showed the subjects of each episode how easy it was to enter their homes, then he would take their prized possessions. Later, he returned the items and told the subjects how they could improve security in their homes. At the end of the show their home's security was improved and the ex-burglar returned to see whether they had "beaten the burglar".

Series 1 which consists of 15 episodes, was first broadcast on BBC One on 8 November 2004, and ended on 28 January 2005.

Series 2 which consists of 10 episodes, was first broadcast on BBC One on 19 September 2005, and ended on 30 September 2005.

== See also ==
- It Takes a Thief (2005 TV series) – A similar US TV series.
