= Dominic Littlewood =

English TV presenter

- Born: 29 March 1965 (age 61); Southend-on-Sea, Essex, England
- Occupations: Journalist, television presenter
- Television: Presenting: Don't Get Done, Get Dom (2006—2015); Saints and Scroungers (2009—2012); Fake Britain (2010—2012, 2017–2019); Cowboy Builders (2010—2014); Dom on the Spot (2016–2018)

Dominic Littlewood (born 29 March 1965), is a British television journalist and television presenter who specialises in consumer protection. He has appeared on the BBC and Channel 5, presenting programmes such as Fake Britain, Cowboy Builders, Saints and Scroungers and Don't Get Done, Get Dom.

== Early life and work ==
Littlewood was born on 29 March 1965 in Southend-on-Sea, Essex. He is one of four children of an air traffic controller father and teacher mother; despite his parents' second jobs, the family were not wealthy, but with his parents' encouragement Littlewood's early entrepreneurial endeavours were successful, buying his first flat in Westcliff-on-Sea, Essex aged 20. His first job was as part of an on-board team repairing Thames sailing barges; when the company relocated from Maldon, Essex to France, he started a City and Guilds apprenticeship in motor engineering.

Dom is diabetic, having been diagnosed with Type 1 diabetes as a child.

== Television career ==
Littlewood was first seen on TV as a contestant on the BBC game show The Other Half.

In 2001, Littlewood, at the time in charge of Network Cars in Leigh-on-Sea, appeared on Faking It, helping Somerset vicar Nigel Done succeed as a car salesman. In 2002, Littlewood appeared alongside Jason Barlow as the resident car expert on BBC Two's Wrong Car, Right Car.

In 2005, Littlewood presented Beat the Burglar on BBC One. This saw convicted burglar Michael Fraser breaking into homes, watched by Littlewood and the homeowners, to highlight the importance of home security.

In 2007, Littlewood took part in the fifth series of BBC One's Strictly Come Dancing, paired with professional dancer Lilia Kopylova. The couple were voted out in week five.

Since 2010, he has co-presented Cowboy Builders on Channel 5.

From 2010 to 2012, he presented Fake Britain on the BBC, but was replaced by Matt Allwright: he returned to the show in 2017. In 2012, Littlewood presented the Postcode Lottery draws on Channel 5. Beginning on 27 January 2015, Littlewood hosted a three-part series on ITV called Bad Builders: Bang to Rights. Since 2016 he has presented Dom on the Spot on BBC One. Littlewood has appeared in other television shows including To Buy or Not to Buy, Holiday and The One Show.

In 2019, Littlewood presented the BBC travel documentary Dom Does America, which saw him investigating the most dangerous jobs in the United States, including being shot with a TASER by police in Texas.

In 2020, Littlewood appeared as a contestant on Celebrity Masterchef.

== Filmography ==
Television

Year	Title	Role
2001	Faking It	Presenter
2002	Wrong Car, Right Car	Presenter
2003–2005	To Buy or Not to Buy	Presenter
2004	How I Made My Property Fortune	Presenter
2005	Beat the Burglar	Presenter
2006—2015	Don't Get Done, Get Dom	Presenter
2007	Strictly Come Dancing	Contestant
2008–2009	Dom's on the Case	Presenter
2009–2012	Saints and Scroungers	Presenter
2010	Total Wipeout: Celebrity Special	Contestant
2010–2012, 2017–2019	Fake Britain	Presenter
2009–2015	Cowboy Builders	Co-presenter
2012–2013	Cowboy Traders	Co-presenter
2012	Postcode Lottery	Presenter
2013—	Caught Red Handed	Presenter
2013	Street Patrol UK	Presenter
2014	Beware! Cowboy Builders Abroad	Presenter
2015	Bad Builders: Bang to Rights	Presenter
2015—2018	Right on the Money	Co-presenter
2016–2018	Dom on the Spot	Presenter
2017	Let's Sing and Dance for Comic Relief	Himself
2017	The Full Monty	Himself
2019	Dom Does America	Himself
2020	Celebrity Masterchef	Contestant
2021	Dom Digs In	Presenter
2021	Deliveries Unwrapped with Dom Littlewood	Presenter
2021	Dom Delivers	Presenter
2022	Maximum Security	Presenter
2022	Celebrity Antiques Road Trip	Contestant
