= The Code (game show) =

- Genre: Game show
- Presented by: Matt Allwright
- Starring: Lesley-Anne Brewis
- Theme music composer: Nick Foster
- Country of origin: United Kingdom
- No. of series: 2
- No. of episodes: 50

Production
- Production location: Dock10
- Running time: 45 minutes
- Production companies: Gogglebox Entertainment (2016); Primal Media (2017)

Original release
- Network: BBC One
- Release: 18 April 2016 – 21 April 2017

The Code is a British television game show that aired on BBC One from 18 April 2016 to 21 April 2017. It is hosted by Matt Allwright and Lesley-Anne Brewis. An individual contestant, or a team of two or three people, attempts to unlock a safe containing a cash prize by answering a series of questions that steadily increase in difficulty. Brewis provides commentary on the correct answers to all questions throughout the game.

== Gameplay ==
The cash prize begins at £3,000 after it is won and increases by £500 per game in which it goes unclaimed. The prize is locked in the safe and secured with a random combination code of three unique digits. The game proceeds through three stages of increasingly difficult general knowledge questions, requiring the team to select one correct answer from a set of three. An incorrect response at any time ends the game and sends the team home empty-handed, while a correct response allows them to select one digit and find out whether it belongs in the code, and if so, where.

- Stage 1: The team is shown three question/answer pairs and must choose the correct one. This stage ends when one digit has been revealed in the code.
- Stage 2: Given the three answers, the team may see the questions associated with any two of them. In series 1, the team had to reject an answer they believed was incorrect at this point; if they were right, they were allowed to see the third question and then try to choose the correct answer. From series 2 on, the team must choose the correct answer after seeing two questions, without knowing anything about the third. This stage ends when a second digit has been revealed.
- Stage 3: Given the three answers, the team may see the question for one of them, then decide if it is correct or not. If they accurately reject it as incorrect, they may see the question for a second answer and then make the same choice. Choosing the correct answer, or rejecting both incorrect ones, allows the team to select a digit. If the team reveals the last remaining digit, the safe opens and they win the prize.

=== Lesley points ===
As of series 2, Brewis offers "Lesley points" to Allwright or the team for supplying additional facts or trivia about the questions in play. These points are used as an informal competition and have no bearing on the overall game.

== Transmissions ==
Series	Start date	End date	Episodes
1	18 April 2016	20 May 2016	25
2	20 March 2017	21 April 2017	25
