= The General (TV series) =

- Genre: Reality television
- Directed by: Dave Heather
- Presented by: Yvette Fielding; Chris Serle; Heather Mills
- Country of origin: United Kingdom
- Original language: English
- No. of series: 1
- No. of episodes: 58

Production
- Production location: Southampton General Hospital
- Running time: 30 minutes

Original release
- Network: BBC One
- Release: 6 April – 26 June 1998

Related
- City Hospital

The General was a BBC fly-on-the-wall television series hosted by Yvette Fielding, Chris Serle and Heather Mills. Based at Southampton General Hospital, the programme tracked the progress of selected patients, including outpatients, at the hospital. The series was broadcast live every weekday on BBC One, in a daytime slot. 58 episodes of the programme aired in total. The original director of the series was Dave Heather.

As well as the presenting team tracking patients and staff in the hospital, the programme also featured Heather Mills abseiling down the side of the hospital and demonstrating various uses for her prosthesis.

The show also featured occasional celebrity guest appearances, including a visit from endurance expert Mike Stroud.

The programme was subsequently renamed City Hospital, continuing with exactly the same format, initially with the same presenters but subsequently presented by Nick Knowles and Gaby Roslin. City Hospital later moved from Southampton General Hospital to Guy's and St Thomas' hospitals in London, with the presentation team changing; subsequent presenters included Jeremy Milnes and Nadia Sawalha.

Both The General and City Hospital were produced by Topical Television.
