= It Takes a Thief (2005 TV series) =

US television program

- Genre: Reality; Crime; Mystery
- Written by: Matt Johnston
- Presented by: Matt Johnston; Jon Douglas Rainey
- Starring: Matt Johnston; Jon Douglas Rainey
- Narrated by: Matt Johnston
- Theme music composer: Tammany Hall NYC
- Country of origin: United States
- Original language: English
- No. of seasons: 2
- No. of episodes: 80

Production
- Executive producers: Allison Corn; Nick Catliff
- Production locations: Connecticut; New Jersey; New York
- Camera setup: Multiple
- Running time: 46 minutes
- Production company: Lion Television

Original release
- Network: Discovery Channel
- Release: February 2, 2005 – April 13, 2007

It Takes a Thief is an American reality television series that originally aired on the Discovery Channel from February 2, 2005, to April 13, 2007. The program stars and is hosted by Matt Johnston and Jon Douglas Rainey, two former thieves who use their unique expertise to teach people in an unusual way to protect their properties.

With the owners' permission, the hosts stage a full-fledged burglary as their victims watch on closed-circuit television (CCTV), either live during the break-in (for season 1) or in real time with pre-recorded video playback (for season 2). Rainey assumes the burglar role and plans and executes the break-ins while Johnston acts as mentor to the security-challenged owners. Immediately following the burglary, Johnston and Rainey meet with the residents to return their stolen goods and explain to them what they have been doing wrong. The majority of break-ins are from weak vulnerabilities like open garage doors, unlocked windows, locks installed incorrectly, using the homeowners ladder left outside or fence to jump to the second floor, etc; they rarely ever had to break a window or kick a door in. Johnston then organizes a complete security makeover and provides additional safety tips. Weeks later, Johnston and Rainey return and attempt another break-in to test whether the homeowners are using their new security system properly. Although most thefts on the show occur in suburban homes, some places such as businesses, college houses, and even a police station have also been burglarized.

== Status ==
The last episode of It Takes a Thief premiered on April 13, 2007. The Discovery Channel has not produced a third season.

On the Discovery Channel, reruns began to air on Tuesday, September 29, 2009, after the last rerun aired the year before (in September 2008). The show is currently available on the streaming service Discovery+.

== Format ==
Shown in the beginning of the program, the disclaimer states:

This program is for entertainment purposes only. Please consult with a home security expert before taking any action to protect your home.

In the introduction, the title sequence states:

Jon Douglas Rainey: burglar, thief...Matt Johnston: thief, intruder...They were a couple of housebreakers...but they turned their lives around....Private eye...Schoolteacher...Now they're back...for one last job...because to catch a thief...It Takes a Thief.

After the title sequence in the introduction of the Season-1 episodes, host and narrator Matt Johnston explains:

I'm Matt Johnston, and this is my partner Jon Douglas Rainey. We used to be burglars, and over the next hour, we're going to use our experience to test the security of one of these properties. You'll watch as Jon breaks into someone's place and steals thousands of dollars' worth of goods, while I sit with the owners and watch on closed-circuit TV....After the break in, I'll use my knowledge to set them straight with a top-to-bottom security makeover. Weeks later, we'll put their new security to the test when we come back unannounced and try to break in, all over again.

Before the title sequence in the introduction of the Season-2 episodes, host and narrator Matt Johnston explains:

I'm Matt Johnston, and this is my partner Jon Douglas Rainey. It's been a while, but once upon a time, we were burglars. Now, we're here to help law-abiding citizens avoid this....First, we find a property that's just begging to get hit....Our producers tell the owners we could strike at any time, day or night. They'll have no idea when it'll go down, just like the real thing. Then, we rig the place with cameras that track Jon's every move, stealing thousands of dollars' worth of goods...or getting caught red-handed. After the break in, a top-to-bottom security makeover....

The format of each episode of the series consists of several parts, stages, or phases. The first and second seasons differ from each other in format.

Season 1 (2005)

- Casing the Hood
- Meeting the Mark
- Casing the Joint
- The Lockdown
- The Break In
- Scene of the Crime
- The Confrontation
- The Loot
- The Fix
- The Final Test

Season 2 (2006–2007)

- Casing the Hood
- Meeting the Mark
- The Break In
- Scene of the Crime
- The Playback
- The Confrontation
- The Loot
- The Fix
- The Final Test

== Season synopsis ==
=== Season 1 (2005) ===
The first season of It Takes a Thief consisted of 40 episodes and originally aired from February 2, 2005, to December 5, 2005.

Matt Johnston and Jon Douglas Rainey survey a neighborhood for a suitable house to burglarize. Homes that appear to have security weaknesses or security-lax owners are targeted. Rainey, who does the actual break-ins, looks for unlocked doors and windows, (the lack of) alarm systems, and any available tools or ladders that can be used to gain entry). He also determines how visible the house is from the street or to the neighbors.

After selecting a house, Rainey leaves to plan the burglary while Johnston meets with the owners to obtain their permission, offering a free security renovation following the break-in. Johnston tours the home to identify unsecured entry points, inventory valuables, and determine what (if any) security measures the homeowners use. None of this information is relayed to Rainey, and Johnston is unaware just how the actual break-in will be executed.

Cameras are installed throughout the house, and the family then locks up as normal when leaving. They then join Johnston in a nearby van to watch the live break-in on TV monitors. Johnston also provides commentary as the burglary is happening.

Rainey treats each break-in as a real heist, ransacking rooms while identifying the most valuable items as quickly as possible, and searching in what many consider secure hiding places. Cars are often taken as well, assuming Rainey can locate the keys. Occasionally, Rainey uses accomplices, and nearly every break-in employs a different strategy. The entire burglary usually take less than 15 minutes, resulting in property loss that can total thousands of dollars. Not all break-ins are successful; police have "apprehended" Rainey on several occasions, although he was immediately released. The producers notify local authorities about the show beforehand.

Once the burglary is over, Johnston takes the owners back into the house to survey the aftermath firsthand. They then meet Rainey—an often emotional encounter. The stolen goods are then returned, and Rainey explains why he chose the items and gives an estimated resale value. Many are stolen because they can quickly be fenced, but others, such as credit cards, passports, birth certificates, etc., can have a long-lasting financial impact on victims through identity theft. Treasured items, like heirlooms, antiques, or collectibles, are irreplaceable, while knives, handguns, and law enforcement uniforms are dangerous in a criminal's hands. The day ends with a cleaning crew putting the house back in order and a security guard posted outside overnight.

The next day, Johnston oversees a complete security makeover. Rainey is again absent during this period. Improvements may include surveillance equipment, new locks, alarm systems, new doors and windows (often with shatterproof laminates applied to the glass), safes, lock boxes, and thief-deterrent landscaping (such as thorny bushes), along with advice on improving security-conscious habits. Johnston warns the homeowners that he and Rainey will return to test how well they are maintaining their new security system.

Several weeks later, Rainey and Johnston reappear when the house is vacant to check whether the new security measures and the homeowner's vigilance prevent Rainey from breaking in again. They then wait for the owners to return and give them an evaluation of how well they employed the new devices. Overall, there were only a handful of times where Rainey (and his associates) were "caught" during the heist.

=== Season 2 (2006–2007) ===
The second season of It Takes a Thief also consisted of 40 episodes and originally aired from October 16, 2006, to April 13, 2007.

The second season's revamped format makes the show's break-ins seem more realistic, surprising, and suspenseful. The producers, rather than Johnston, now make the initial contact with the owners. They are warned that the burglary could happen unannounced at any time and are told to continue with their normal routines, as opposed to watching the burglary live on closed-circuit television (CCTV).

Rainey now monitors the residence, learns the homeowners' routines, and (usually) waits for the house to be vacant. When he feels it is time to strike, he calls Johnston and proceeds with the break-in. As Rainey burglarizes the residence (knowing that the homeowners could return at any time), Johnston alone watches the heist unfold live on the CCTV monitors while giving commentary. When the homeowners return, Johnston arrives at the scene of the crime, talks to the victims, and tours the residence with them to survey the aftermath. He then shows them the footage of how the break-in unfolded.

From this point, the show continues as before, with Rainey returning the family's possessions, a team of experts installing security measures, and Johnston and Rainey returning in a few weeks to test those measures.

== The presenters ==
Matt Johnston (front) and Jon Douglas Rainey (back), the hosts of the show.

=== Matt Johnston ===
Matthew T. Johnston was born on December 6, 1976, in Odessa, Texas. He currently resides in California, although he has lived in Austin, Texas, Weatherford, Oklahoma, and New York City. During his youth, Johnston burglarized homes, but after being arrested and sentenced to paying restitution, he turned his life around. Johnston has since worked as a teacher and is now an actor, writer, and filmmaker, founding his own production company, Trigger Entertainment, to develop independent film projects. Johnston stated, "If I really had a criminal background, I wouldn't be able to work with children. I mean to even work on the Discovery Channel show, there were extensive background checks. To paraphrase Twain, the rumors of my thievery are greatly exaggerated." In addition to hosting It Takes a Thief, he has TV and movie roles to his credit, including Cowboy Smoke, which premiered at the 2008 Cannes Film Festival, and an appearance on Friday Night Lights. Johnston also directed several It Takes A Thief episodes during the second season. He has been in pre-production for a movie titled Pain and was working on a documentary titled Roundball, among other film projects.

=== Jon Douglas Rainey ===
Jon Douglas Rainey was born on January 27, 1970, in Camden, New Jersey. He is a veteran of The United States Coast Guard and currently resides in New Jersey, although he has lived in New York City and Tennessee. He has worked on tv projects such as Mare of Easttown and Boardwalk Empire. Jon co-wrote the film A Turn in the Sun is the father of one daughter and is married to Jennifer Rainey.

== See also ==
- Beat the Burglar – A similar British TV series
