= David Grifhorst =

Dutch game show creator and television director

David Grifhorst (born 22 June 1978 in Deventer) is a Dutch game show creator and television director who created the British game show The Exit List on ITV1. He is also known as (former) director of the Dutch television show De Wereld Draait Door. On 1 December 2012 he was the director of the Junior Eurovision Song Contest 2012 in the Netherlands. He directed the Dutch version of The Passion and The Passion: New Orleans on FOX.
