= Matt Barbet =

British journalist and presenter

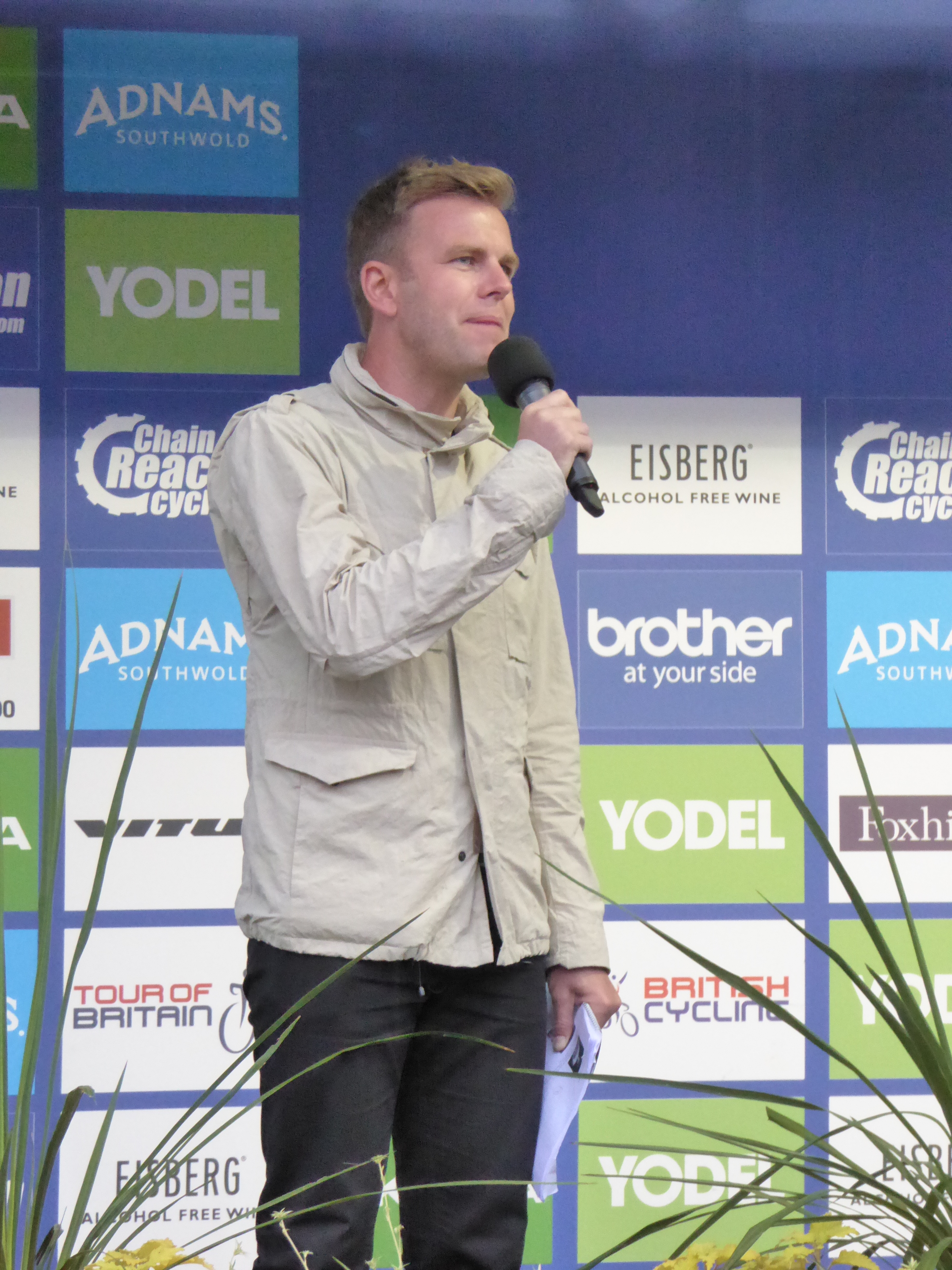
- Barbet at the 2016 Tour of Britain
- Born: Matthew Barbet; 8 June 1976 (age 50); Chester, Cheshire, England
- Education: University of Cardiff
- Occupations: Journalist, presenter, newsreader
- Years active: 2000-present
- Employer(s): Current; Sky News; Former; ITN (for 5 News); ITV; BBC
- Notable credit(s): BBC News (2003–07); 5 News (2007–2012, 2014–17); Daybreak (2012–14); The Cycle Show (2014—); The Wright Stuff (2014–18, stand in); The Saturday Show (2015–16)
- Spouse: Katie Barbet
- Children: 2

Matthew Barbet (born 8 June 1976) is a British television presenter and journalist, best known for his work with Channel 5 and ITV.

In 2003, Barbet joined BBC News, where he worked on various news programmes. In September 2007, he left BBC News so he could join 5 News. He covered some of the broadcaster's main news events. In September 2012 until April 2014, Barbet co-presented Daybreak alongside Ranvir Singh, before returning to 5 News for 5 News Tonight.

Barbet has also presented The Cycle Show for ITV4 and The Saturday Show for Channel 5.

== Early life ==
Growing up in Cilcain in North Wales, Barbet attended the Alun School in Mold, Flintshire and later studied at Cardiff University before returning to the Cardiff School of Journalism.

== Career ==
Before joining BBC London in 2003, Barbet worked at BBC Radio 1 as a newsreader on the Sara Cox Breakfast Show. In 2006 he presented BBC London's Children in Need coverage. He also presented the BBC's STORYFix programme – a light, upbeat look at the news shown on BBC News 24 and the BBC website. In 2007 he was an occasional relief presenter for BBC Breakfast.

In September 2007, Barbet was named as a presenter and correspondent for 5 News on Channel 5. His position came after Kirsty Young, the principal anchor, announced her departure from the programme. He took up his new role in November 2007. In June 2008, Matt Barbet and Isla Traquair, were announced as stand-in presenters on 5 News while Natasha Kaplinsky was on maternity leave. Matt visited Haiti in January 2010 after the earthquake and has also been embedded with the British Army in Afghanistan. In February 2011, he was announced as the new presenter of the flagship 17:00 programme, after Kaplinsky left the station. He left on 26 July 2012.

On 11 June 2012 it was announced Barbet would leave 5 News to join ITV Breakfast's Daybreak. He made his debut on 3 September 2012 and presented the show from 6:00 am to 7:00 am with Ranvir Singh. Throughout 2012, Matt occasionally reviewed the news on This Morning with Singh.

On 17 August 2013, Barbet made his debut presenting the ITV News weekend bulletins on ITV and ITV News London on ITV London. In December 2013, Matt appeared as a contestant in a Text Santa special of the ITV game show The Chase, and won £55,000 for ITV's Text Santa appeal.

On 3 March 2014, it was announced that Daybreak had been axed and would be replaced by Good Morning Britain later in the year. Matt presented his final episode of Daybreak on 4 April 2014, and it was confirmed by the Daily Mirror on the same day that he would not be part of the presenting team at Good Morning Britain. During his time at Daybreak, Matt co-presented 330 editions of the show.

On 16 April 2014, it was confirmed that Barbet would rejoin 5 News to present their 5 News Tonight programme, weekdays at 6:30 pm. He returned as host of 5 News on 28 April 2014. Commenting on his return to Channel 5, Matt said "I'm really happy to be returning to Channel 5 at what is a very exciting time for the network".

From 2014 until 2015, Barbet has presented The Cycle Show on ITV4.

In October 2015, it was announced that Barbet would co-present The Saturday Show, a Saturday morning programme for Channel 5. He left the show in July 2016, replaced by Matt Allwright.

On 4 December 2017, it was confirmed that Barbet would leave 5 News and he presented his last edition of the programme on 15 December 2017.

Since 2018, Barbet has been a partner at London PR firm Freuds.

20 February 2024, Barbet announced that he had joined Sky News as a news presenter and will present the weekly Sunday show from 10am-2pm, as well as covering at other times when necessary.

== Personal life ==
Barbet lives in Lewes, East Sussex with his wife Katie and their two daughters. Barbet is a runner and road cyclist. He is a patron of the Educate for Life charity and ran the London Marathon in 2010 and 2016. He rode the first three Ride London events, and in 2015 was the fastest celebrity to cross the line, completing the 100-mile/160-km course in 4 hours 24 minutes.

== Filmography ==
TV

- The Weakest Link — Contestant
- BBC News (2003–2007) – Presenter
- BBC Breakfast (2007) – Stand-in presenter
- 5 News (2007–2012, 2014–2017) – Anchor
- Daybreak (2012–2014) – Co-presenter, alongside Ranvir Singh
- This Morning (2012) – Occasional newspaper reviewer
- The Chase: Text Santa Special (2013) – Contestant
- ITV News (2013–2014) – Stand-in anchor
- The Cycle Show (2014–2015) – Presenter
- The Saturday Show (2015–2016) – Co-presenter, with Gaby Roslin
- Sky News (2024) - Presenter
