= John Van Voorst =

English publisher (1804–1898)

John Van Voorst (15 February 1804 – 1898) was an English publisher of natural history books. His publications were noted for their high quality, reasonable prices, and the frequent inclusion of superior illustrations by notable artists.

== Biography ==
John Van Voorst was born in Highgate on 15 February 1804 to a family of Dutch descent. At the age of 16, he began a six-year apprenticeship in Wakefield before returning to London to work for the publishers Longman, Green, Orme, Hurst & Co. He established his own publishing business in Paternoster Row in 1833. Initially, he focused on illustrated reprints, including Gray's Elegy in a Country Church-Yard and Goldsmith's Vicar of Wakefield, but he soon specialized in natural history books, often illustrated, and was appointed bookseller to the Zoological Society in 1837.

Some of his most notable publications included British Fishes (by Yarrell, 1835), British Quadrupeds (by Bell, 1836), and British Birds (by Yarrell, 1837). With the exception of Darwin, Van Voorst collaborated with most of the leading naturalists of his time, including Alfred Russel Wallace, Philip Henry Gosse, George Johnston, Edward Forbes, Edward Newman, and Richard Owen. He also employed notable illustrators such as John Constable, William Mulready, Richard Westall, Edwin Landseer, and Copley Fielding. By 1871, his catalog of active titles included 224 books and learned journals, most of which focused on natural history.

Van Voorst published the journal The Zoologist for more than forty years, from January 1843 until 1886.

In addition to natural history works, he published children's books, including those of author and sanitary reformer Anne Bullar, who wrote anonymously. He retired in 1886, after which his assistants took over the business under the name Gurney and Jackson.

He was a founding member of the Royal Microscopical Society in 1839 and became a Fellow of the Linnean Society in 1853.

Following his retirement, Van Voorst remained active until his death in London on 24 July 1898.

== Sources ==
- Parsons, Gill (2020). "Voorst, John Van (1804–1898)". Oxford Dictionary of National Biography. University of Oxford Press. doi:10.1093/ref:odnb/41202.
