= Princess Anne Hospital =

- University Hospital Southampton NHS Foundation Trust
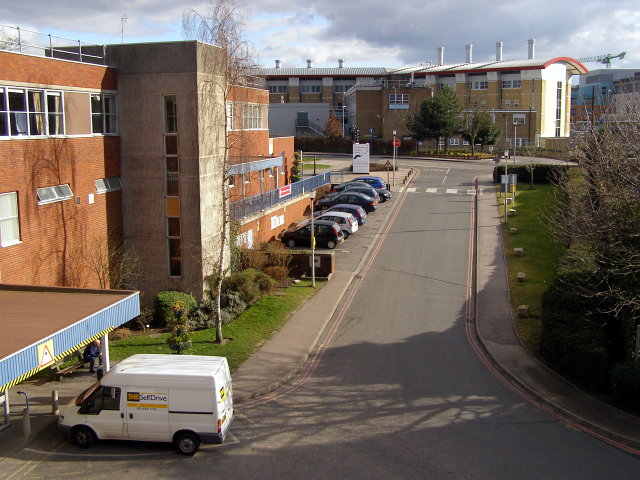
- Princess Anne Hospital

- Shown in Hampshire

Geography
- Location: Southampton, Hampshire, England
- Coordinates: 50°56′07″N 1°26′06″W

Organisation
- Care system: National Health Service
- Type: Maternity

History
- Founded: 1981

Links
- Website: www.uhs.nhs.uk/for-visitors/princess-anne-hospital

The Princess Anne Hospital is a maternity hospital in Southampton, England, to the north of Southampton General Hospital. It is operated by the University Hospital Southampton NHS Foundation Trust.

== History ==
The hospital was commissioned by the National Health Service to serve as a dedicated maternity hospital in the 1970s. The site selected was open land on the north side of Coxford Road, opposite Southampton General Hospital. The new hospital was designed in the modern style, built in brick and glass and was opened by Princess Anne on 28 March 1981. During the 1980s, c. 5,000 babies were being born there every year.

The hospital was the location for the first two series of Channel 4's One Born Every Minute broadcast in 2010 and 2011. A digital breast screening unit was established at the hospital in September 2013. In April 2019, the hospital was ranked by the US magazine, Newsweek, as one of the best 129 specialist care centres in the world.

Princess Anne, who is Patron of the Royal College of Midwives, returned to the hospital for a visit and spoke to patients in February 2023.

== See also ==
- List of hospitals in England
