= Fake Britain =

British consumer rights television series

- Genre: Consumer rights
- Presented by: Dominic Littlewood (2010-2012, 2017-2019); Matt Allwright (2013-2016)
- Original language: English
- No. of series: 9
- No. of episodes: 115 (+ 3 special episodes)

Production
- Executive producers: Gerard Melling; Emma Barker; Peter Lowe
- Editors: Nick Laughton; Tom Lowe; Julian Hill
- Running time: 45 minutes

Original release
- Network: BBC One
- Release: 8 March 2010 – 17 July 2019

Related
- Watchdog; Doorstep Crime 999

Fake Britain is a British consumer rights programme, presented by Dominic Littlewood between 2010 and 2012 and again from 2017 to 2019, and by Matt Allwright from 2013 to 2016.

The programme is broadcast on weekdays in a daytime slot, with shortened repeats often shown in the evening prime time.

The programme covers various aspects of counterfeiting and its effects on consumers, including dangerous tools, ineffective or dangerous medicines, shoddy goods sold under reputable names, and documents used for identity theft.

== Transmissions ==
Series	Start date	End date	Episodes
1	8 March 2010	12 March 2010	5
2	16 May 2011	3 June 2011	15
3	21 May 2012	8 June 2012	15
4	29 April 2013	10 May 2013	10
5	28 April 2014	23 May 2014	20
6	23 November 2015	4 December 2015	10
7	29 August 2016	23 September 2016	20
8	18 September 2017	29 September 2017	10
9	4 July 2019	17 July 2019	10

=== Special episodes ===
- Fake Britain: Bogus Booze Special (18 July 2011) – A one-off programme presented by Littlewood about counterfeit alcohol.
- Fake Britain: Fake Food Special (3 June 2013) – A one-off programme presented by Allwright about food fraud in the UK. The show was watched by 3.25 million viewers.
- Fake Britain Special: Furniture Inferno (13 January 2014) - A one-off programme presented by Allwright about potentially lethal sofas and mattresses being sold by UK retailers.
