= Into the Fire (2005 film) =

2005 television film

- Theatrical poster
- Screenplay by: Michael Phelan
- Directed by: Michael Phelan
- Starring: Sean Patrick Flanery; Melina Kanakaredes; JoBeth Williams
- Country of origin: United States
- Original language: English

Original release
- Release: September 18, 2005

Into the Fire is a 2005 Independent drama film from first-time director Michael Phelan that stars Sean Patrick Flanery, Melina Kanakaredes, and JoBeth Williams.

== Plot ==
In the immediate aftermath of the September 11, 2001 terrorist attacks, three New Yorkers respond to a new tragedy. June Sickles Fiorilli (JoBeth Williams) lost her firefighter son on 9-11 and now lives with her granddaughter Quinn, not far from the very firehouse that her boy called home. Walter Hartwig (Sean Patrick Flanery) is the lieutenant in charge on the night a jumbo jet crashes on final approach into Kennedy Airport, intertwining him to June and music teacher Catrina Hampton (Melina Kanakaredes), who is awaiting the arrival of her twin sister.

== Critical response ==
Of Into the Fire, Jeffrey Lyons said "It is an intelligent, compelling film" remarking that "JoBeth Williams gives one of her best, most complex performances." New York Magazine said Flanery's "strong performance grounds the film".

== See also ==
- List of firefighting films
