= Chris Hollins (broadcaster) =

English journalist, presenter and sportsman

- Born: Christopher Jonathan Hollins; 20 March 1971 (age 55); Bromley, London, England
- Occupations: Journalist, Presenter, Sportsman
- Notable credit(s): BBC Breakfast (2005–12); Watchdog (2010–15); Food Inspectors (2012–14)
- Spouse: Sarah Alexander (m. 2012)
- Parent: John Hollins
Association football career
- Height: 5 ft 8 in (1.73 m)
- Position: Midfielder
Senior career*
Years	Team	Apps	(Gls)
1994–1995	Aldershot Town	?	(?)
- * Club domestic league appearances and goals
- Cricket career

Cricket information
- Batting: Right-handed
- Bowling: Right-arm off break

Domestic team information
- Years: Team
- 1994: Oxford University
- FC debut: 20 April 1994 Oxford University v Glamorgan
- Last FC: 29 June 1994 Oxford University v Cambridge University

Career statistics
Competition	First-class
Matches	8
Runs scored	415
Batting average	51.87
100s/50s	1/2
Top score	131
Balls bowled	1,419
Wickets	19
Bowling average	46.84
5 wickets in innings	0
10 wickets in match	0
Best bowling	4/64
Catches/stumpings	6/–
- Source: CricketArchive, 22 December 2007

Christopher Jonathan Hollins (born 20 March 1971) is an English journalist, presenter and TV personality. Hollins is best known for being the sports correspondent for BBC Breakfast until 2012 and for winning the seventh series of Strictly Come Dancing in 2009.

Hollins presented the BBC consumer rights series Watchdog from 2010 until 2015.

== Early life ==
Hollins was born into a footballing family in Bromley, south London. His father was John Hollins, the former Chelsea, Arsenal, Queens Park Rangers and England footballer. His uncle David was a goalkeeper and played for Newcastle United as well as Wales, winning eleven caps.

Hollins was educated at Bickley Park School in Bromley and Tonbridge School. He graduated from Durham University in 1993 with a degree in history and sociology and a special diploma in social sciences from Keble College, Oxford in 1994.

== Career ==
=== Sport ===
After leaving Tonbridge School in 1989, he played football for Charlton, Queens Park Rangers, and Aldershot Town. He then attended Durham University and subsequently Oxford University for whom he played first-class cricket and gained a blue.

=== Television ===
Hollins started his media career at London TV station Channel One TV, then owned by Associated Newspapers. He then moved to Sky Sports in 1994 followed by spells at GMTV, Meridian and Five TV.

Hollins joined BBC News in 1999, and has also reported for Grandstand and Football Focus. He joined BBC Breakfast in October 2005, replacing Rob Bonnet.

Hollins was the main sport presenter on Breakfast, presenting on Mondays–Thursdays until his final show on 21 March 2012 (he had decided not to make the move to Salford as the show was being relocated). He was also a regular male relief presenter during the week, standing in for main presenter Bill Turnbull. Hollins has reported from the 2002 World Cup in Japan, the 2010 World Cup, and America to cover The Masters golf in 2007.

In 2009, Hollins joined the presenting team of the BBC One antiques show Cash in the Attic.

In April 2010, Hollins co-presented The One Show for a week alongside Louise Minchin while regular hosts Adrian Chiles and Christine Bleakley were unavailable. Hollins returned to co-host an episode with Alex Jones in March 2016.

In September 2010, Hollins became a co-presenter on Watchdog. He later left following the 2015 series. In July 2011 Hollins became a co-presenter on BBC One's programme The Great British Weather.

Hollins and Matt Allwright presented three series of Food Inspectors, a factual programme which began airing on BBC One in February 2012. In 2016, Hollins co-presented the third series of Secret Britain alongside Ellie Harrison and Denise Lewis.

=== Strictly Come Dancing ===
Hollins won the 2009 series of Strictly Come Dancing with dance partner Ola Jordan, beating Ricky Whittle in the final. He consistently won the public vote throughout, despite losing the judges' vote 190 – 186 in the Final. Hollins and Jordan were the only pair in the competition never to face the "Dance Off"

=== Film ===
Hollins appeared in the 2007 film Run Fatboy Run as a marathon commentator alongside Denise Lewis.

== Personal life ==
Hollins married Sarah Alexander, an account director for a marketing company, on 3 March 2012 at Chelsea Old Church. The couple have a son and daughter. They live in Rotherfield Greys, Oxfordshire, having moved there from Battersea, south London in 2016.

=== Charity work ===
In 2008, Hollins became a patron of children's cancer charity CLIC Sargent. Chris Hollins is an ambassador for Gold Challenge, part of the official mass participation legacy programme for the London 2012 Games, and a supporter of WellChild.

== Filmography ==
Television

Year	Title	Role	Notes
1999	BBC News		
	Grandstand	Reporter	
	Football Focus	Reporter	
2005–2012	BBC Breakfast	Sport presenter	
2009	Strictly Come Dancing	Competitor	Series 7 winner
2009–2012	Cash in the Attic	Co-presenteter	
2010, 2016	The One Show	Guest presenter	
2010–2015	Watchdog	Co-presenter	Alongside Matt Allwright
2011	The Great British Weather	Co-presenter	
2012–2014	Food Inspectors	Co-presenter	Alongside Matt Allwright
2016	Secret Britain	Co-presenter	Series 3 onwards; with Ellie Harrison and Denise Lewis
2021–2025	Golf's Greatest Holes	Co-presenter	Since Series 1

Film

Year	Title	Role	Notes
2007	Run Fatboy Run	Marathon commentator	
