= Crimewatch (disambiguation) =

Crimewatch or Crime Watch are television programs in different regions, usually made in conjunction with police and seeking information about unsolved crimes from the public.

== Television shows ==
- Crimewatch, UK
- Crimewatch Live, UK
- Crimewatch File, UK
- Crimewatch Solved, UK
- Crime Limited, UK Crimewatch spin-off
- Crime Watch Daily, US, investigative news and reports on crime
- Crimewatch, Singapore
- Crime Watch, Trinidad and Tobago

== See also ==
- Neighborhood watch, citizens' organizations watching out for crime in a neighborhood
