= Paul Hickson =

British swimming coach and sex offender

Paul Anthony Hickson (10 May 1947 – 27 December 2008) was a British swimming coach and convicted sex offender. He abused his position of power as a coach to serially rape and sexually assault several teenage students. He was ultimately convicted of fifteen charges in 1995, including two charges of rape and eleven charges of indecent assault, resulting in a 17 year long prison sentence.

== Early life ==
He grew up on Norwich Road in Leicester, the son of Arthur Walter Hickson (1914–2000) and Iris Mary Wilby (1920–2009), who had married in 1940. His grandparents were John Henry (1888–1978) and Elizabeth Hickson (1886–1949).

At grammar school (since 1976 the comprehensive City of Leicester College) he swam for Abbey house. He gained two A-levels. He swam for Knighton Fields swimming club in the 1960s, and also took part in diving competitions. He later swam with Leicester Swimming Club at Vestry Street Baths (closed around 1973, demolished, now Curve theatre).

He trained as a physical education teacher at Borough Road College, a teacher training college, in Isleworth (Osterley), around 1967. This college became West London Institute of Higher Education in 1976 when it merged with Maria Grey Training College, and part of Brunel University London in 1997.

== Career ==
=== Norwich ===
He taught for a few years at a Norwich comprehensive school, becoming the head of football for Norwich schools. He set up his own swimming club, as he did not think that the local swimming clubs had the sufficient standard that he was looking for. At Norfolk he coached David Stacey. He worked with the England youth swimming team from 1978. He became head of the England youth swimming team in April 1981, aged 33. He would take over at the City of Coventry swimming club in mid-September 1981.

=== Coventry ===
He moved from a Norwich swimming club to a West Midlands swimming club in September 1981. At Coventry was Annabelle Cripps, Bettina Doyle, Paul Howe, Gareth Sykes and David Stacey. His Coventry team came second in national competitions against teams such as Barnet Copthall of north London, Nova Centurion of Nottingham, Wigan Wasps and Beckenham. He was selected as a coach for the 1982 Commonwealth Games in Brisbane.

He went as a coach to the 1982 World Aquatics Championships in Guayaquil in Ecuador at the end of July 1982, where he complained about the team's travel arrangements and accommodation.

In mid-January 1983, he was given three months notice by the swimming club's chairman after unpaid bills were discovered in November 1982, and the club's finances were deteriorating. He left Coventry on Tuesday 12 April 1983, and would join Swansea on 1 June 1983.

=== University College Swansea ===
In 1983, he moved to University College Swansea, where he trained Duncan Rolley (brother of Andy Rolley) and Helen Walsh.

On 22 January 1986, he was appointed to be the England team coach, which was not paid, with only expenses. He was the head coach for the 1986 World Aquatics Championships in August 1986 in Spain and the 1986 Commonwealth Games in Edinburgh. He had a dispute about the opening hours of the Royal Commonwealth Pool in Edinburgh, which did not open until 8am. With the Australian team manager, he complained to the City of Edinburgh District Council.

He coached the British swimming team at the 1984 Summer Olympics. The chief coach at the 1984 Olympics was Rick Bailey.

He developed the early career of Kathy Read and Karen Mellor. He took the British team to the U.S. Open (swimming) in December 1986 in Florida.

He was the head swimming coach for the 1988 Summer Olympics. At the 1988 Olympics, Gerry Thain was the swimming team manager, who had been team manager in 1984. He was replaced fir the 1992 Olympic chief coach by Terry Denison.

He was the team manager for the July 1987 World Student Games in Zagreb, Yugoslavia, featuring Elaine Gilfillan of the Dunfermline College of Physical Education and Neil Cochran of the University of Aberdeen, and Arizona State University. The team won three medals at the 1988 Summer Olympics; British Olympic head swimming coaches were appointed by the Amateur Swimming Federation of Great Britain.

His last event as the England team coach was at the Sun Life European Cup in Edinburgh, against East Germany, where the English womens medley team beat East Germany; the team was Karen Pickering, Madeleine Scarborough, Kathy Read and Suki Brownsdon. 6ft 8 Kevin Boyd, a medical student at Newcastle University, broke a British record; Boyd had reported Hickson to the ASA in 1986, in consultation with Gaynor Stanley. Much of the main East German team, including the superlative Kristin Otto, were absent, resting in (communist) Berlin.

He was chosen to be the team manager for the 1989 Summer Universiade, which was to be in Brazil, but was held in West Germany without any swimming events. On 16 November 1989, he wrote to The Times, discussing the Commonwealth Games Council for Wales, giving an address in Uplands, Swansea.

In June 1991, with Clive Rushton, he picked a team of 30 swimmers for the July 1991 World Student Games, with 19 males and 11 females; 11 of these were studying at American universities, with Richard Leishman of the University of South Carolina and Sean McQuaid of Loughborough University, both from Scotland.

=== Somerset ===
Whilst studying for an M.Sc. course at University College Swansea, he became the swimming coach at an independent school in Somerset in September 1991.

He was the England team coach for the July 1992 European Schools Swimming Championships in Caen in northern France.

== Sexual assaults ==
=== Norwich ===
He had carried out sexual assaults and rape on teenage girls from at least 30 September 1976, when in Norwich.

=== Swansea ===
In 1986, the ASA had been told by a male swimmer that Hickson had given female swimmers unwelcome attention. But as the women were over the age of 16, the ASA saw nothing that was obviously illegal.

When assistant director of physical education at University College Swansea, in 1987, he had made a female student strip naked in a fitness test. The student had complained to the university, but Hickson received only a written warning from the director of physical education, Stan Addicott, around the end of 1987. Notably, the female who complained was not a swimmer, but had required a fitness test for her interest in rock climbing; on the first fitness test the procedure followed was nothing out of the ordinary, but it was on the subsequent second test that Hickson asked the student to strip naked; she complied, but was not that unexpectedly alarmed until when Hickson stripped as well, and tried to kiss her; at the September 1995 trial, the jury did not find Hickson guilty on this assault.

Female students were advised not to be alone with him in fitness tests. It transpired that six other female students had been stripped naked by him during such fitness tests. The university did not alert the British Olympic Association or the Amateur Swimming Federation (headquartered in Loughborough) about his conduct. The university had viewed the incident as a 'one off', as no other incidents had been reported. When applying for his next position as a swimming coach, the university had also given him an excellent reference.

=== Somerset ===
On 21 July 1992, 16-year-old Emma-Jane Needle of Porthcawl mentioned that Hickson had tried to molest her, accidentally overheard by police Detective Sergeant Roger Went.

On 12 September 1992, Hickson was suspended from his position as coach at the Millfield independent school after allegations of serious sexual assaults against teenage girls between 1984 and 1991, when working as a coach at University College Swansea, which South Wales Police investigated, led by Detective Inspector Bryan Jenkins. In September 1992, four female witnesses were firstly interviewed by Detective Sergeant Tony Thomas, of the Family Support Unit in Skewen.

He was given eight charges of indecent assault and one charge of rape at Cockett police station on 3 November 1992, and appeared at a Swansea court on 8 December 1992. Five of the eight females claiming assault had been under 16.

=== France ===
In September 1993, he absconded from appearing at Swansea Court, in relation to indecent assaults on eight teenage girls.

=== Arrest ===
During Crimewatch on 17 February 1994, Hickson was featured in the Photocall segment. Four previous swimmers from Norwich contacted Crimewatch, with two reporting rape (from 1976 to 1977). Had he not absconded, and his picture appeared on Crimewatch, these rapes may not have been reported.

On 23 December 1994, he was followed by police after arriving in Kent from Roubaix in northern France, and was found at Center Parcs holiday village in Sherwood Forest and re-arrested. Hickson had travelled the whole world with the British team, and Swansea police had had beliefs that he could end up in a place like Australia or the United States, requiring extradition if discovered. His solicitor was David Hutchinson. His wife offered £25,000 for bail, but any bail was refused. On 31 January 1995 at a Swansea court, he was given another charge of rape. He was held in HM Prison Swansea.

=== Court ===
He eventually appeared at Cardiff Crown Court on 5 September 1995, where he was accused of carrying out systematic indecent assault and rape over fifteen years. He was prosecuted by Sir Wyn Williams and defended by Sir Anthony Evans. Nine females gave evidence against him in court. To explain the naked examination of female undergraduate swimmers, he said that a female had voluntarily dropped her shorts and underclothes, adding that he was "very embarrassed and nonplussed by the entire situation. I left the room, telling her to get dressed, and that I would come back in a moment".

John Prosser gave him 12 years for two rapes, and five years for the indecent assaults.

=== Conviction ===
On 27 September 1995, he was convicted of fifteen of the seventeen charges, including two of rape, by a jury of eight men and four women. He was cleared of two charges of indecent assault against a former Commonwealth Games swimmer and a twenty-year-old Swansea University student. Hickson was sentenced to 17 years imprisonment following the three-week trial. Following his conviction, the chief executive of the Amateur Swimming Federation of Great Britain expressed that the body was "extremely concerned" that one of their coaches could be guilty of such offences and assured parents that vetting and supervision procedures would be reviewed and tightened. At conviction, David Sparkes was the chief executive of the Amateur Swimming Association of Great Britain, later the head of British Swimming. A mother of a female swimmer said 'Hickson, at the time, had an almost god-like image in the sport. He also had the gift of the gab, and was very manipulative'.

On 28 September 1995 a large picture of him appeared on the front page of The Times; its editorial mentioned the National Coaching Foundation and the National Association of Sports Coaches, and reported that, unlike school teachers, children's sports coaches did not require a criminal record check.

The sentence was reduced from 17 to 15 years in February 1997, on an appeal, by Joyanne Bracewell.

On 18 March 1998, the 50-minute Dreams of Gold was shown as part of Crimewatch File on BBC1, narrated by Jill Dando. The case was featured on File on 4 on 10 July 2012 on BBC Radio 4. It was featured on 24 May 2016 on BBC Radio 5 Live.

In October 2002, Hickson attempted to acquire early parole, but it was rejected by Sir Roderick Evans, who noted that the parole board did not accept he had sufficiently changed his lifestyle to prevent him reoffending. Evans further expressed that Hickson had to demonstrate that the likelihood of him reoffending again was reduced, suggesting that this could not be demonstrated solely by the passage of time.

=== Repercussions ===
In June 1996 the Cheltenham & Gloucester College of Higher Education held a national child protection in sport conference run by Prof Celia Brackenridge, funded by the Sports Council. But, in 1996, child protection was not viewed as important by either the Sports Council or the NCF. The Sports Council would not spend any more money on child protection. The Sports Council told the NCF to look into child protection. Other public organisations have since had noted difficulty rooting out 'bad apples', notably the Metropolitan Police and the Church of England.

Also in June 1996 Channel 4 produced a documentary series called 'Fair Game', about the questionable funding and bureaucracy of British national sports bodies, such as the Sports Council, and looked at inertia and lethargy, presented by Greg Dyke. It was intentionally shown a few weeks before the 1996 Olympics.

The NSPCC formed the Child Protection in Sport Unit.

The Protection of Children Act 1999, made in response partly to what Hickson accomplished, was passed on 15 July 1999, brought in by Stourbridge MP Debra Shipley. The third reading was on Friday 30 April 1999, and was passed by the House of Lords on Monday 5 July 1999.

Swimline was set up by Swim England. Former Met Police detective Keith Oddy was employed by Swim England.

== Personal life ==
He suffered from asthma.

He had married when 21, and had a daughter. He had lived on Bek Close, Norwich, in the 1970s, and later on Luddon Lane in Baltonsborough in the early 1990s.

== See also ==
- Antony James, GB swimmer sentenced September 2024
- Brian Phelps (diver), a series of indecent assaults and rape from 1976 to 1986
- In 1955, List 99 began, which blacklisted people in education, held from 2012 by the Independent Safeguarding Authority. DBS background checks are now required for employment in education
