= Crimewatch Live =

British television programme produced by the BBC

- Crimewatch Live title card (2021–present)
- Also known as: Crimewatch Daily; Crimewatch Roadshow
- Genre: Factual
- Based on: Aktenzeichen XY… ungelöst Crimewatch
- Presented by: Rav Wilding; Michelle Ackerley (Formerly: see full list)
- Country of origin: United Kingdom
- Original language: English
- No. of series: 3 (Daily); 12 (Roadshow); 11 (Live)
- No. of episodes: 58 (Daily); 260 (Roadshow); 165 (Live) (list of episodes)

Production
- Production locations: New Scotland Yard, London (Daily); MTV Studios, Camden (2009–2010); Broadcasting House, Cardiff (2011–2020); BBC Cymru Wales New Broadcasting House, Cardiff (2021–present)
- Camera setup: Multiple-camera
- Running time: 60 minutes (Daily); 45 minutes (Roadshow and Live)
- Production companies: BBC Studios; BBC Cymru Wales

Original release
- Network: BBC One
- Release: 27 November 2000 – 7 December 2001
- Release: 1 June 2009 – present

Related
- Crimewatch File; Crime Limited; Crimewatch Solved

Crimewatch Live (previously known as Crimewatch Roadshow Live or simply Crimewatch Roadshow and originally as Crimewatch Daily) is a British television programme produced by BBC Studios Documentary Unit Cymru Wales, that reconstructs major unsolved crimes in order to gain information from the public which may assist in solving them. The programme is broadcast on BBC One.

== History ==
=== 2000–2001: Crimewatch Daily ===
First aired on 27 November 2000, Crimewatch Daily was the initial daily version of the original Crimewatch programme, aired between 10:00 and 11:00am on weekday mornings, that appealed for help with unsolved cases not covered in the main programme. Broadcast from a specially designed studio at New Scotland Yard, the series was presented by Phil Gayle and Jane Moore. Two further series aired throughout 2001, before the final edition was broadcast on 7 December 2001.

=== 2009–2020: Crimewatch Roadshow ===
First broadcast on 1 June 2009, Crimewatch Roadshow was the second daily version of the BBC's Crimewatch programme, that was broadcast on weekdays from 9:15 to 10:00am. From 2009, the main Crimewatch programme did not broadcast in June, being instead replaced by twenty shows broadcast on a daily basis throughout the month. The Crimewatch Roadshow broadcast live from a different area of the country for each episode, often containing features on how the local police force helps to solve everyday crime. In the first two series, the chief presenter was situated in a London studio setting before the production relocated to Cardiff to integrate with the flagship programme.

Twelve series of the show have been broadcast. Rav Wilding has presented throughout, first appearing as a co-presenter alongside Sophie Raworth and later Ginny Buckley before being promoted to main anchor from the third series onwards. Miriam O'Reilly, Dave Guest, Alice Bandhukvari, Nicola Rees, Sian Lloyd, Sonali Shah, Michelle Ackerley and Tina Daheley have all appeared on-location as co-presenters throughout the series' run. In the first two series, BBC regional correspondents also provided weekly reports from each region visited, with local news teams providing campaign updates throughout the day via their regional news bulletins.

During the fifth series, former Crimewatch presenter Jacqui Hames co-presented every Friday, updating viewers on success stories from years past.

In October 2017, it was announced that following the cancellation of the main programme, it would now broadcast two series per year. This resulted in the tenth and eleventh series being spilt into two parts and extended to run for seven and six weeks respectively. From the twelfth series onwards, Ackerley was promoted to anchor alongside Wilding in the studio, with John Paul Davies joining the team as the new roving reporter. From this point onwards, each series now runs for fifteen episodes over three weeks.

=== 2021–present: Crimewatch Live ===
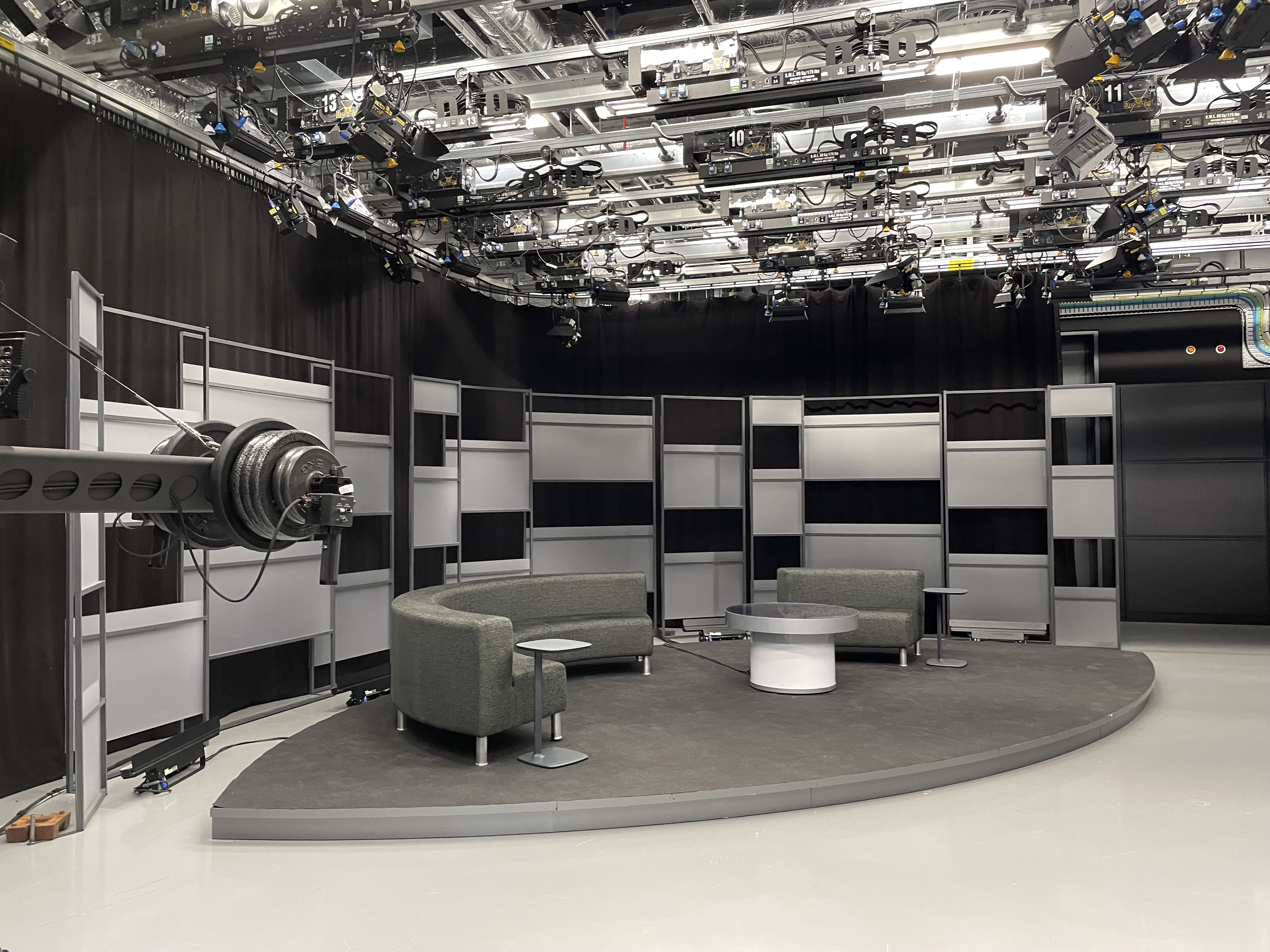
General studio on the ground floor of New Broadcasting House, Cardiff

First broadcast on 8 March 2021, Crimewatch Live is the third and current daily version of the BBC's Crimewatch programme, that broadcasts on weekday mornings originally from 11:00 to 11:45am before moving an hour earlier from September 2021. It is now filmed in BBC Cymru Wales New Broadcasting House, Cardiff, with presenters Rav Wilding and Michelle Ackerley in the studio, and John Paul Davies reporting on scene. Davies left the programme after three series as the role of on-location reporter was retired.

In October 2025, Ackerley was absent due to being on maternity leave and was replaced by stand-ins Steph McGovern and Jennifer Reoch. McGovern presented the show on Mondays and Tuesdays, while Reoch covered Wednesdays through Fridays during the first two weeks of the series' return, with McGovern returning to host the entire third week alongside Wilding.

For the March 2026 series, Ackerley and McGovern shared the role as co-presenter alongside Wilding; Ackerley hosted the show Mondays through Wednesdays, with McGovern now hosting on Thursdays and Fridays. Later that year, the autumn series saw Ackerley return full time as co-anchor alongside Wilding.

== Show format ==
Broadcasting on weekday mornings, at various times over the years, it features approximately three or four cases per show with each case featuring reconstructions of the crime. It is one of the largest live factual studio productions. The films shown often feature interviews with senior detectives and/or relatives or friends of victims. Key evidence is usually shown, such as E-FIT profiles of suspects and details of certain lines of enquiry.

Other features to the show include a "CCTV section", which showed crimes caught on CCTV with enhanced imagery of suspects. A "Wanted Faces" section was also featured: four close-up pictures of suspects police are trying to trace are shown on screen. This section also frequently involves information about suspects, including aliases. These four photos are shown upon the programme's closing credits, one of the few programmes in which the BBC do not 'show the credits in reduced size'.

Viewers can contact the show by phoning 08000 468 999, with the phone lines remaining open until 12:30pm on the morning of the programme. Viewers can also send text messages to 63399 24/7. Due to the high demand for cases to be shown on the programme, many other cases are added to the website. These are joined by reconstructions, CCTV footage and wanted faces that have been shown on previous programmes. All reconstructions, CCTV footage, faces and cases remain on the Crimewatch Live website until the criminals are caught or suspects convicted. Each programme can be watched on the BBC iPlayer catch-up service for 24 hours (later increased to seven days) from broadcast.

== Presenters ==
=== Crimewatch Daily ===
Presenter	Tenure	Additional information
Phil Gayle	2000–2001	Main presenters of the original Crimewatch Daily series
Jane Moore	2000–2001	Main presenters of the original Crimewatch Daily series

=== Crimewatch Roadshow (Crimewatch Live since 2021) ===
Presenter	Tenure	Additional information
Rav Wilding	2009–present	Presenter of Crimewatch Roadshow for every series. Promoted to main studio anchor from the third series onwards.
Sophie Raworth	2009	Main studio presenter during the first series in June 2009.
Ginny Buckley	2010	Main studio presenter during the second series in 2010.
Miriam O'Reilly	2011	Co-presenter during the third series in 2011.
Dave Guest	2012	Co-presenter during the fourth series in 2012.
Sian Lloyd	2013–2015	Second longest-serving co-presenter.
Sonali Shah	2015	Co-presenter during third and final week of series 7 in June 2015.
Michelle Ackerley	2015–present	Longest-serving co-presenter before being promoted to co-anchor in September 2020. Absent for series 22 due to maternity leave.
John Paul Davies	2020–2021	Former newsreader and sports journalist who was co-presenter for series 12, 13 and 14.
Steph McGovern	2025–2026	Co-presenter that was originally as stand-in for series 22.
Jennifer Reoch	2025	Scottish broadcaster who was stand-in co-presenter for series 22.

== Transmissions ==
=== Crimewatch Daily ===
Series	Start date	End date	Episodes	Main presenter(s)
1	27 November 2000	1 December 2000	5	Phil Gayle; Jane Moore
2	29 January 2001	9 March 2001	29	Phil Gayle; Jane Moore
3	5 November 2001	7 December 2001	24	Phil Gayle; Jane Moore

=== Crimewatch Roadshow (Crimewatch Live since 2021) ===
Series	Start date	End date	Episodes	Main studio presenter(s)	Location co-presenter(s)
1	1 June 2009	26 June 2009	20	Sophie Raworth	Rav Wilding
2	7 June 2010	2 July 2010	20	Ginny Buckley	Rav Wilding
3	6 June 2011	1 July 2011	20	Rav Wilding	Miriam O'Reilly
4	11 June 2012	6 July 2012	20	Rav Wilding	Dave Guest; Alice Bhandhukravi; Nicola Rees
5	10 June 2013	5 July 2013	20	Rav Wilding	Sian Lloyd; Jacqui Hames (Fridays)
6	9 June 2014	4 July 2014	20	Rav Wilding	Sian Lloyd
7	8 June 2015	3 July 2015	20	Rav Wilding	Sian Lloyd (Weeks 1–2); Michelle Ackerley (Week 3); Sonali Shah (Week 4)
8	6 June 2016	1 July 2016	20	Rav Wilding	Michelle Ackerley
9	12 June 2017	7 July 2017	20	Rav Wilding	Michelle Ackerley (Weeks 1–3); Tina Daheley (Week 4)
10	4 June 2018	29 June 2018	35	Rav Wilding	Michelle Ackerley
10	4 March 2019	22 March 2019	35	Rav Wilding	Michelle Ackerley
11	9 September 2019	27 September 2019	30	Rav Wilding	Michelle Ackerley
11	9 March 2020	27 March 2020	30	Rav Wilding	Michelle Ackerley
12	7 September 2020	25 September 2020	15	Rav Wilding; Michelle Ackerley	John Paul Davies
13	8 March 2021	26 March 2021	15	Rav Wilding; Michelle Ackerley	John Paul Davies
14	6 September 2021	24 September 2021	15	Rav Wilding; Michelle Ackerley	John Paul Davies
15	7 March 2022	25 March 2022	15	Rav Wilding; Michelle Ackerley	—N/a
16	3 October 2022	21 October 2022	15	Rav Wilding; Michelle Ackerley	—N/a
17	6 March 2023	24 March 2023	15	Rav Wilding; Michelle Ackerley	—N/a
18	2 October 2023	20 October 2023	15	Rav Wilding; Michelle Ackerley	—N/a
19	4 March 2024	22 March 2024	15	Rav Wilding; Michelle Ackerley	—N/a
20	30 September 2024	18 October 2024	15	Rav Wilding; Michelle Ackerley	—N/a
21	3 March 2025	21 March 2025	15	Rav Wilding; Michelle Ackerley	—N/a
22	6 October 2025	24 October 2025	15	Rav Wilding; Steph McGovern (Note: McGovern presented episodes 1–2, 6–7 and 11–15 as stand-in for Ackerley); Jennifer Reoch (Note: Reoch presented episodes 3–5 and 8–10 as stand-in for Ackerley)	—N/a
23	2 March 2026	20 March 2026	15	Rav Wilding; Michelle Ackerley; Steph McGovern (Note: McGovern presented episodes 4–5, 9–10 and 14–15 in lieu of Ackerley)	—N/a
24	5 October 2026	23 October 2026	15	Rav Wilding; Michelle Ackerley	—N/a

== See also ==
- Crimewatch
- Crimewatch File
- Crime Limited
