= Roger Singleton =

British executive (born 1942)

Roger Singleton CBE
- Born: November 1942
- Occupation: Business executive

Sir Roger Singleton CBE (born November 1942) is chair of the Independent Safeguarding Authority (now part of the Disclosure and Barring Service) and the Diana, Princess of Wales Memorial Fund.

He was chief executive of Barnardo's for 21 years, succeeding Mary Joynson, and was awarded a knighthood for his services to children in 2005. He has served on public inquiries into child abuse in children's homes and is involved in the governance and management of various charities. Singleton is an accredited mediator. In 2003 as chief executive of Barnardo's he was criticised for supporting emotionally manipulative advertising campaigns to raise the charity's profile. In this case the UK advertising standards authority found in Singleton's and Barnardo's favour.

Singleton has been chairing the ISA since 2007. The ISA was set up to deliver its responsibilities under the Safeguarding Vulnerable Groups Act (2006) and as part of the Vetting and Barring Scheme (VBS). It makes barring decisions on those people referred to it (usually from employers) following harm or the risk of harm to a child or vulnerable adult. It has the legal powers to place or remove people from both of its barred lists (for Children and Adults). In March 2009 the Government appointed Singleton Chief Adviser on the Safety of Children, where his responsibilities included advising the Government on strategic priorities and reporting annually to Parliament on safeguarding progress. He stood down from the role in June 2010.

In his role as Chief Advisor, Sir Roger was asked by Ed Balls the then Children's Minister to undertake a 'check' on the Government's definition of 'regulated activity' – the guidance which would define whether someone needed to be registered under the Scheme. His recommendations were published in December 2009 – "Drawing the line" and were accepted by the Government. His proposals were projected to reduce the number of people due to be ISA-Registered by approximately 2million. In 2010, the Coalition Government initially announced a delay to registration and then undertook a review of the VBS, which proposed a series of amendments to the Scheme including the abolition of the need to register. The proposals are currently going through Parliament in The Protection of Freedoms Bill – to which Singleton was asked to give evidence.

The Independent Safeguarding Authority continues to exist although it has been amalgamated with the Criminal Records Bureau. The ISA retains the role of maintaining a list of people barred from working with children and vulnerable adults. Singleton's continued defence of the re-structured ISA continues to draw criticism as the ISA is still perceived by many as being authoritarian and structured in an unethical way with journalists such as Josie Appleton continuing to protest against it via the 'Manifesto Club' which she chairs. [2] This has been seen by some as having damaged his credibility severely. This was particularly demonstrated by successful legal cases taken by the Royal College of Nursing against the ISA in 2010. The Royal College of Nursing alongside other organisations continues to campaign for the ISA to include a hearing within the ISA barring process, for the ISA to have minimal standards of evidence and to have flexible sanctions, indeed that the ISA should use the word 'sanction' when describing the barring process. The ISA under Singleton's leadership continues to resist these changes[3].

Sir Roger Singleton was awarded an honorary doctorate from the University of Bath in 2011.
