= Dena Thompson =

British murderer, con artist and bigamist (born 1960)

- Born: 1960 (age 65–66); Hendon, London, England
- Other name: 'The Black Widow'
- Occupations: Confidence trickster and fraudster
- Status: Released in June 2022
- Convictions: Murder, theft, fraud, deception
- Penalty: Life imprisonment with a 16-year minimum tariff for murder (2003), 3 years and 9 months for deception (2000), 18 months for theft (1995)

Details
- Victims: 1–2 murder victims, several others robbed or defrauded, attacked third husband but acquitted of attempted murder on grounds of self-defence
- Span of crimes: 1980s–2000
- Country: United Kingdom
- Date apprehended: 2 January 2000

Dena Thompson (born 1960), commonly known as The Black Widow, is a British convicted murderer, confidence trickster and bigamist who is also suspected of having killed a second individual.

Dena habitually met men through lonely hearts columns and stole their money. She was imprisoned for murdering former media manager Julian Webb, her second husband (though she was still married to her first). She had previously been acquitted of the attempted murder of her next husband Richard Thompson (whom she married in 1998 after her divorce), having attacked him with a baseball bat and a knife but being cleared on the grounds of self-defence.

Despite her acquittal for the attempted murder of Thompson, police became suspicious of the circumstances in which previous husband Webb had died, and after Webb's remains were exhumed and analyzed she was convicted of murder and sentenced to life imprisonment.

A High Court ruling in 2007 determined she would serve 16 years, meaning she would not be eligible for release until 2019. She was also convicted of theft and defrauding former lovers.

Following her 2003 conviction, Detective Chief Inspector Martyn Underhill stated: "This woman is every man's nightmare, the most dangerous woman I have ever met. For a decade, she has targeted men sexually, financially and physically. The men of Britain can sleep safe tonight knowing she has been taken off the streets." A judge described her as: "one of the most fluent liars I have come across." DCI Underhill observed Thompson was a misandrist: "I think the events of her childhood have made her hate men. If you look at her life, it is always men she has targeted." After her murder conviction it was revealed that police were investigating the suspicious disappearance of a previous partner she had in Bulgaria, who has never been found.

As of May 2022, Thompson was being held in an open prison with day release provisions (either HM Prison Askham Grange or HM Prison East Sutton Park as these are the only two open prisons for women in England). Thompson was granted release on parole in May 2022, and was released in June.

== Early life ==
Thompson was born Dena Holmes in 1960 in Hendon, North London. She worked for a building society. Her father was described in 2000 as a retired prison warder. She moved to Sussex in the 1980s with her first husband. At the time of her arrest Thompson was living at an address in Cullompton, Devon.

== Lee Wyatt ==
Thompson married Lee Wyatt in 1984, having met two years previously. She convinced Wyatt he had received £50 million for a toy he had patented and was wanted by the mafia. He was forced to live homeless for years in order to 'escape' the mafia. The defence described Wyatt as a "fantasist". She had previously secured an injunction against Wyatt after making false claims of being assaulted by him.

During their marriage, she stole £23,000 from the building society in which she worked then attempted to blame it on Wyatt. She was jailed for 18 months in 1995 for this crime. They divorced in 1997.

== Julian Webb ==
Thompson bigamously married Julian Webb in 1991. She murdered him on his 31st birthday in June 1994 by poisoning a curry. Webb had a penchant for very hot curry and it is speculated that this would have masked the taste of the anti-depressants. He died of an overdose of anti-depressants and ground aspirin in a drink. As he lay dying in bed, his mother had called to speak to him on his birthday, but she was told by Thompson that he was too unwell. His mother told her to call a doctor but she did not.

The inquest into his death recorded an open verdict. Thompson unsuccessfully attempted to have his body cremated. The very next morning after Webb died she had tried to collect money amounting to £35,000, which would be released from his pension plan, in the event of his death but Webb's mother was able to establish that Thompson was not his next of kin, as she was still married to her first husband. Webb's mother later testified that she had warned her son about marrying a woman whom he had known for only three months.

== Richard Thompson ==
Dena Holmes married Richard Thompson, her third husband, in 1998. They lived together in Rustington near Brighton, Sussex. On 1 January 2000, she attempted to kill her bound-and-gagged husband with a baseball bat. She had asked him if she could tie him up and blindfold him for a sexual game, but once she did so she returned to the room with the bat and a knife and attacked him. He managed to free his hands and fight back against her, and despite bleeding profusely from the head managed to force her to drop the knife. After this she broke down, saying "It's all been a lie. I've spent all your money". Richard later recounted his subsequent feelings on an episode of Crimewatch Solved in 2009:

"I cannot believe what has just happened. This woman has turned into some kind of monster. There was no indication whatsoever till a few minutes previously."

Dena Thompson left the house and the next day an estate agent turned up unexpectedly, explaining that he had been told by her that he was to sell the house and stating he expected Richard would be in Florida. It emerged that Thompson had planned to kill her husband and then sell their house while he was on a long-planned trip to Florida, as no one would be suspicious of his disappearance since they would have thought he was away in America.

Richard contacted the police and his wife was soon arrested. Police interviewed her former partners and found that she had stolen money from all of them and emptied their bank accounts of funds. Richard Thompson's accounts were likewise discovered to have been emptied. She admitted to police to conning money from men but denied trying to kill her husband. She claimed that he had attacked her following the revelation that she had defrauded him and had retaliated in self-defence. At the trial, the jury acquitted her of attempted murder charges, but she was convicted on 15 counts of deception, which she had admitted before the trial, and sentenced to three years and nine months imprisonment for the money she stole from Thompson and two other lovers. Richard Thompson later described Dena as "pure evil'.

== Murder inquiry ==
Despite her acquittal for attempted murder, investigating officers had grown suspicious of the circumstances of the death of Thompson's second husband, Julian Webb, six years previously. They announced that they would be exhuming Webb's body, which was done in October 2001. A friend of Thompson's came forward to tell police that she had indicated to him that she had given the overdose of drugs to her husband in a hot curry.

=== Conviction for murder ===
In 2003, Thompson was convicted of Webb's murder after a trial at the Old Bailey and sentenced to life. She was told her sentence would run to 16 years at a 2007 High Court ruling, meaning she would not be eligible for release until 2019. The judge at her 2003 trial described her as "utterly ruthless and without pity". Wyatt, her first husband, had contacted her at the home she shared with Webb, and the motive for murder, according to the prosecution, was her fear the two men would meet and her double life would be exposed. Webb was also unaware of her attempts to try and implicate Wyatt for her thefts from the building society.

She was dubbed "The Black Widow" in the press, as a black widow spider will kill their male counterparts after mating with them.

As of 2016, Thompson was imprisoned in HM Prison Send, but she became eligible for parole in 2019.

== Additional suspected victim ==
Following her 2003 conviction, it was reported that Thompson was being investigated about the disappearance of another of her previous partners, Stoyan Kostov. Investigators had tried to trace all of Thompson's former lovers in order to establish if she had committed potentially criminal acts against further victims, stating "we cannot rule out the possibility that other partners have been injured in some way".

It was discovered that Kostov, whom she dated in the 1970s and 1980s, had been missing since he had dated Thompson while she was training as a gymnast in Bulgaria. In 2010, media interest was renewed in the disappearance after a new probe was launched, with investigators stating that "some sort of incident seems to have happened in Bulgaria but we don't know what it was." As of 2021, Kostov had never been found.

== Release ==
In April 2022, the parole board announced that they would consider Thompson's case for release and publish their decision in May. It was revealed that Thompson was already being held in an open prison with day release provisions (either HM Prison Askham Grange in York or HM Prison East Sutton Park in Kent, as these are the only open prisons for women in England). Sean McDonald, the officer who led the investigation into Thompson, expressed his concern at her potential release, stating: "I believe she will reoffend, she won’t be able to stop herself. She has no remorse but will be the model prisoner and say all the right things. Her potential release concerns me and everybody who has been involved with her."

Richard Thompson, the former husband of Thompson, also stated that he hoped Thompson would stay in prison, saying: "She definitely tried to kill me, and they proved that she murdered her second husband. So, she would have been a serial killer if she had been successful. And God knows what else she has done." Richard also complained he had not been notified of the parole hearing.

On 23 May, it was announced that Thompson's release on parole had been granted and she would be released in early June. In a document setting out their decision, the Parole Board stated that they were satisfied from her progress in prison that she was suitable for release, although it was also noted that Thompson had previously been a "deceptive" individual who "could hold grudges" and did not always have "control of her temper".

In August 2022 it was reported that Thompson had been seen out shopping having been released.

== In popular culture ==
=== Documentaries ===
Thompson's case has featured in multiple documentaries:

- On 29 June 2005, Channel 4 aired a documentary on Thompson titled 'The Black Widow'. It was part of their Cutting Edge series.
- On 6 January 2009, Thompson was the subject of an episode of Crimewatch Solved.
- On 31 August 2012, Thompson was the subject of a season 6 episode of Deadly Women. It was titled 'Insatiable Greed'.
- On 3 October 2013, an episode of Britain's Deadly Women was aired that featured Thompson's case.
- A Sky documentary titled Black Widow was released in September 2024.

=== Books ===
A book was published about Thompson in 2010 by Adrian Gatton. It was titled Black Widow: The True Story of How Dena Thompson Lured Men into a Twisted Web of Sex, Lies and Murder.
