= Sian Lloyd =

Sian Lloyd or Siân Lloyd may refer to:

- Sian Lloyd (news presenter) (born 1968), Welsh television news presenter
- Siân Lloyd (born 1958), Welsh weather presenter on television
