= Mary Joynson =

Mary Grace Joynson (5 December 1924 – 13 April 2013) was a British childcare worker, the director of Barnardo's, the UK's largest children's charity Barnardo's, from 1973 to 1984.

Joynson was born in Bingham, Nottinghamshire, the youngest of three children of a Methodist minister and his teacher wife. She was educated at Trinity Hall School, Southport, and the London School of Economics.

She was succeeded as chief executive of Barnardo's by her deputy, Roger Singleton.
