= Ian Sharp =

British film and television director

- Born: 13 November 1946 (age 79); Clitheroe, Lancashire, England
- Occupations: Film and television director
- Years active: 1975–2010
- Notable work: Who Dares Wins; Robin of Sherwood; Tracker
- Spouse: Sue Cook

James Ian Sharp (born 13 November 1946, Clitheroe, Lancashire) is an English film and television director. He is best known for directing the SAS action thriller Who Dares Wins (1982) and Robin of Sherwood (1984) as well as directing the action sequences of the James Bond film Goldeneye (1995).

== Life and career ==
Sharp was educated at Queen Elizabeth's Grammar School, Blackburn and Durham University (Hatfield College) where he gained an honours degree in Psychology and Modern Philosophy in 1968. During the 1970s, he worked at the BBC making documentaries first for the General Features Department and then for Music and Arts, especially Arena and Omnibus. In 1978, the BBC gave him 3 months sabbatical to make a movie called The Music Machine, and it was this experience that led him to turn towards drama. His first break came in 1980 with the ITV comedy drama series Minder. The way Sharp directed a fight sequence for an episode of Minder brought him to the attention of the producers of The Professionals. He made a total of 6 episodes for those two series.

Shortly after that, he directed Who Dares Wins (1982), his second feature film, for producer Euan Lloyd. Who Dares Wins was perceived by some as a right-wing film and Sharp says he lost career opportunities because of this. In a 2021 interview Sharp said: "I always suffered because of that. I was offered Highlander and it was between me and Russell Mulcahy, who’s a very gifted director. The American producer wanted me, but on the British side they said I was a right-wing fascist. I know that for a fact because the American producer told me."

Sharp was disappointed in the kind of film projects he was offered after Who Dares Wins and returned to television. Next came the first six episodes of Robin of Sherwood for ITV, and the ensuing few years consisted of mainly television work until Robert Zemeckis asked him to direct the second unit on Who Framed Roger Rabbit starring Bob Hoskins.

In 1994, he directed the action scenes for GoldenEye, starring Pierce Brosnan. His tank chase sequence and the daring dam jump which opens the picture are much respected in the industry.

After being out of work for two years, Sharp accepted an offer to direct RPM, starring Emmanuelle Seigner, Famke Janssen and David Arquette. Sharp now regrets ever having taken the job. In a 2021 interview he said: "I read the script and thought it was terrible. The action in the film could not be shot. The producer wanted it all to be real stunts. I told him it couldn’t be done. (...) I tried to make something that I knew was impossible."

His last feature film is Tracker (2010), a project for which the producers initially wanted Martin Campbell as a director. Sharp successfully campaigned to direct the film himself.

He speaks fluent French and German and lives in Oxfordshire with his wife, the broadcaster and author Sue Cook, whom he married in 2004.

== Filmography ==
- The Big Time (1976, documentary) – director
- Americans (1978, documentary) – director
- The Music Machine (1979) – director, outline
- Seven Artists (1979, documentary) – director
- Minder (1980–82, TV series) – episode "You Need Hands" & "All Mod Cons" – director
- The Professionals (1980–82, TV series) – director
- Who Dares Wins (1982) – director
- Robin of Sherwood (1984, TV series) – directed all of Series 1
- The Corsican Brother (1985) – director
- C.A.T.S. Eyes (1986, TV series) – director
- Yesterday's Dreams (1987, TV series) – director
- Who Framed Roger Rabbit (1988) – 2nd unit director
- Codename: Kyril (1988) – director
- Pursuit (1989) a.k.a. Twist of Fate – director
- Pride and Extreme Prejudice (1989) – director
- Secret Weapon (1990) – director
- Split Second (1992) – director of additional sequences
- Pleasure (1994) – director
- GoldenEye (1995) – 2nd unit director
- Tess of the d'Urbervilles (1998) – director
- RPM (1998) – director
- Mrs Caldicot's Cabbage War (2002) – director
- Tracker (2010) – director
