= Call Nick Ross =

- Running time: 9 am – 10 am
- Country of origin: UK
- Language(s): English
- Home station: BBC Radio 4
- Hosted by: Nick Ross
- Original release: November 1986 – 1997

Call Nick Ross was a phone-in current-affairs radio programme on BBC Radio 4 between November 1986 and 1997.

Replacing the similar "Tuesday Call", the programme was heard each Tuesday between 9 am and 10 am, immediately following the Today programme, and so attracted an audience of politicians and journalists who were encouraged to phone in themselves. It was not uncommon for a listener to be able to talk directly to a government minister or someone else who was making news that day.

The series won Nick Ross an award as broadcaster of the year in 1997. It was cancelled that year, soon after Ross left the show, saying that he wanted to "leave on a high". However there was speculation that Ross had resigned due to the show being replaced during the election season with Election Call with Peter Sissons.
