= The Truth About Crime =

- Directed by: Tom Anstiss
- Presented by: Nick Ross
- Country of origin: United Kingdom
- No. of series: 1
- No. of episodes: 3

Production
- Executive producers: Sam Collyns; Roger Graef; Emma Willis
- Producer: Alice Perman
- Production locations: Oxford, England
- Running time: 60 minutes
- Production companies: Mentorn Media; Films of Record

Original release
- Network: BBC One
- Release: 21 July – 4 August 2009

Related
- Crimewatch

The Truth About Crime is a British television documentary series inspired and presented by Nick Ross in association with the film-maker Roger Graef, executive producer Sam Collyns and series producer Alice Perman. It was first broadcast on BBC One in July and August 2009.

== Region ==
The show focused on a single city, Oxford, which has demographics and crime rates broadly representative of urban Britain, and used a multitude of techniques to measure the real extent of crime and victimisation. In a two-week crime audit, camera teams followed police, fire services and paramedics and an on-line questionnaire, based closely on the national British Crime Survey, invited residents and businesspeople to describe their personal experiences of victimisation. A survey of 14- and 15-year-olds in Oxford schools was one of the biggest of its kind ever undertaken to discover how under-16s are affected by, and involved in, crime. Random children from some of the schools were then chosen to take part in the series being quizzed on crime by Ross on such topics as theft, drugs, alcohol and many other things.

== Programme 1 ==
The first programme (BBC One 9pm Tuesday 21 July 2009) looked at violent crime and revealed that almost all woundings involved victims who had been drinking or who had been assaulted by someone who was drunk, and took place close to a licensed premise.

=== Lack of commensuration with official statistics ===
Most of the seriously injured, as measured by those treated in hospital, did not report what had happened to the police. One senior physician told Nick Ross that police figures on crime are virtually "meaningless". The physician interviewed was Jonathan Shepherd, a professor of Oral and Maxillofacial Surgery at the Cardiff University Dental School. Domestic violence was shown to be a major problem, though mostly resulting only in minor injuries, and with women as perpetrators as well as men. Women were interviewed in a Women's shelter.

=== Crime mapping ===
Helmet cameras were shown and Spencer Chainey of the Jill Dando Institute at University College London described crime mapping, which uses geographic information systems.

=== Alcohol-fuelled violence ===
A licensing officer from Thames Valley Police, a Hook Norton Brewery executive and David Poley, the Chief Executive of the Portman Group, were interviewed. Ross went on to describe several interventions which had cut alcohol-related violence in the UK and elsewhere and urged a more pro-active approach to tackling alcohol-related violence. For most of the incidents, there were few arrests featured.

== Programme 2 ==
The second in the series (Tuesday 28 July) explored the nature of acquisitive crime and proposed solutions to burglary, car theft and fraud. Ross implied that society needs to accept human nature for what it is and focus less on how to penalise criminals and more on taking sensible precautions with tempting valuables. Temptation and opportunity drives crime far more than "badness". 90% of burglaries are to fuel a drug habit. A 19-year-old single mother, Kelly, burgled some students, who were meanwhile happily enjoying themselves in a pub, to fund her heroin habit. A policeman said that this type of crime is committed by people who find themselves in social and emotional situations from which they find it difficult to get out of.

=== Shoplifting ===
There are around fifty persistent burglars in Oxford. Some of them would commit up to twenty burglaries a week. A shoplifter who was caught by CCTV in a shop, stealing a £10 set of headphones, turned out to be a 19-year-old Polish immigrant who possessed no ID. Nick Ross even confessed to shoplifting occasionally when a teenager, as did school pupils interviewed. During a normal weekday, shoplifting peaks at 3.30pm when school ends.

=== Distraction burglary and scams ===
Distraction burglary is different to more common random burglary, and is rarer but often more upsetting because it involves more dedicated and skilful felons. The ruthless individuals perpetrating this crime usually target properties around the edge of Oxford near the ring road, and tend to come from outside the area. Household scams, of a ruthless and targeted similar nature, usually involved elderly people who would be cajoled into paying astronomical prices for unnecessary repair work done on their property. The rogue traders involved were difficult to trace by county council Trading Standards officers. An elderly couple were conned into paying for minor repairs with their entire life savings. Online scams were more prevalent than perhaps realised, with up to £20bn of online fraud committed a year. It was investigated by the e-commerce unit of SOCA. Richard Cox of The Spamhaus Project was interviewed about internet crime.

=== Rehabilitation ===
The police thought that prison was the best place for persistent burglars. It kept the burglars off the streets. Prison was not viewed as a deterrent because the persistent offenders live such types of lives that they would be better looked after in prison than on the streets, with regular meals and companionship. Once they left prison they would quickly reoffend. Rehabilitation centres for repeat offenders and drug addicts were not successful because the offenders were not of a capable mental state to be sufficiently receptive or adaptive to the treatments given

=== Prevention not cure ===
Some of the crimes, especially rare ones targeting the elderly, are committed by lifestyle criminals, but most offenders are un-glamorously ordinary and few are "ogres" even in the eyes of the police. Most solutions lie in better design and sensible precautions. Since crime peaked in the 1990s homeowners have halved burglary rates by locking their doors and windows, retailers and tackled shoplifting by guarding their open shelves with security devices, and vehicle manufacturers have made cars so difficult to steal that auto-crime is now largely confined to old bangers.

== Programme 3 ==
The third and final show (Tuesday 4 August) exposed widespread anti-social behaviour and the lack of a concerted response. Much of anti-social crime is not added to the official crime statistics. Much of it is fuelled by drugs and gang culture of under-educated and employed young males under the acronym NEET. The chief constable of Thames Valley Police, Sara Thornton, was interviewed. It was found that improved styles of architecture for estate housing and lit thoroughfares can reduce anti-social crime significantly.

== Perspective on crime statistics ==
Ross's general thesis is that recorded crime rates are unreliable, that theft and violence have actually declined sharply but that the downward trend may not be continuing, and that there are hundreds of quite simple solutions to crime, mostly by reducing temptations and opportunities for bad behaviour rather than trying to remould people's predispositions.

== Reception ==
The series was generally well received, with The Times "fascinated [by the] sane, insightful and compellingly argued documentary series" – and achieved good ratings despite being scheduled against ITV1's fast-moving, similarly themed Car Crime UK, a six-part police car-chasing documentary series narrated by Trevor McDonald.
