= Nick Ross =

British radio and television presenter (born 1947)

Nick Ross CBE
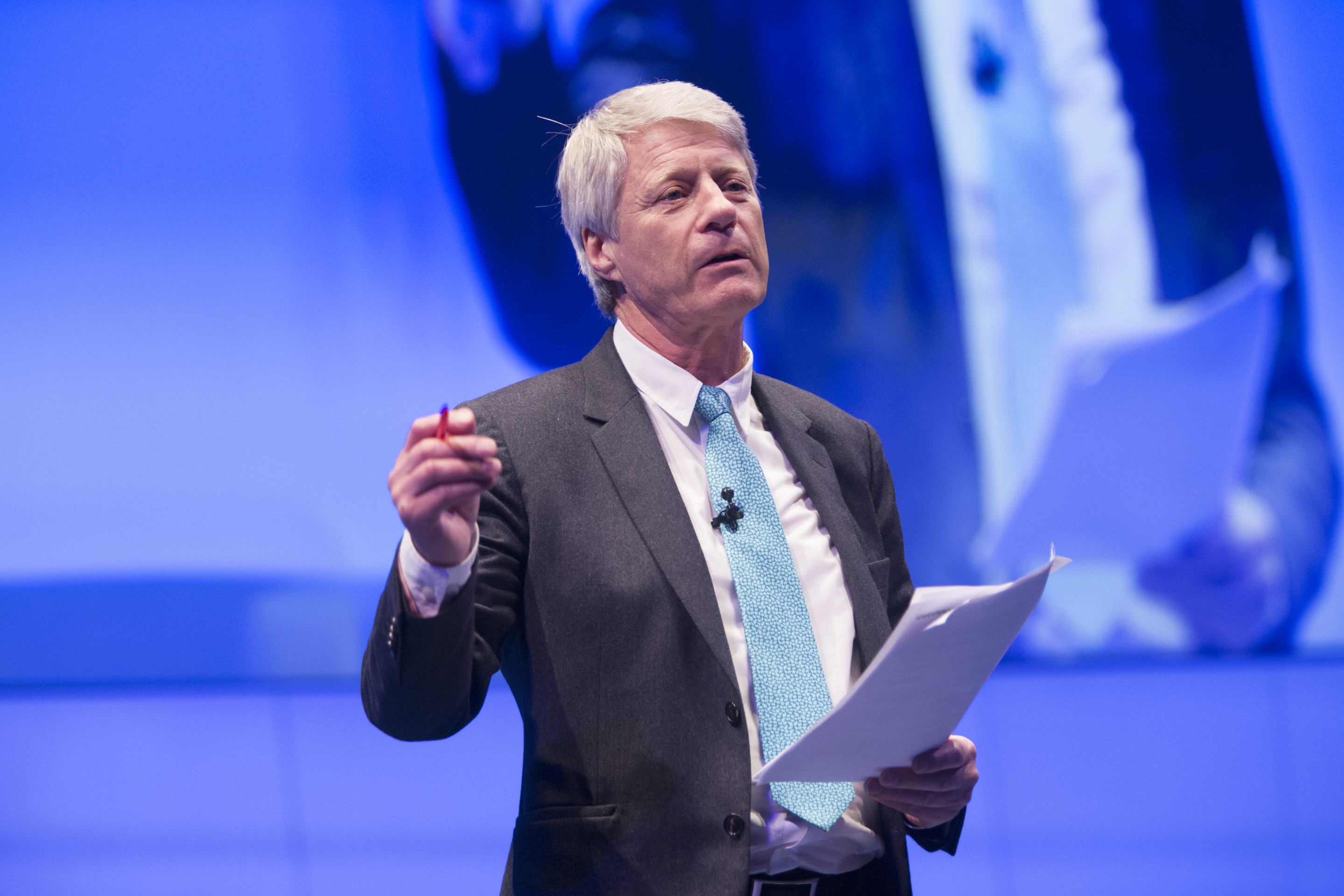
- Ross moderating the WTTC Global Summit 2017
- Born: Nicholas David Ross; 7 August 1947 (age 79); Hampstead, London, England
- Education: Wallington County Grammar School
- Alma mater: Queen's University Belfast
- Occupations: Radio and television presenter
- Years active: 1971–present
- Known for: Hosting BBC's Crimewatch from 1984 to 2007
- Notable credit(s): Man Alive; Breakfast Time; Sixty Minutes; Watchdog; Call Nick Ross; The Truth About Crime
- Spouse: Sarah Caplin
- Children: 3

Nicholas David Ross (born 7 August 1947) is an English radio and television presenter. During the 1980s and 1990s he was one of the most ubiquitous of British broadcasters but is best known for hosting the BBC Television programme Crimewatch, which he left in 2007 after 23 years. He has subsequently filmed a series for BBC One called The Truth About Crime and has made documentaries for BBC Radio 4. He is chairman, president, trustee or patron of a number of charities including the National Fire Chiefs Council, and is President of the British Security Industry Association and HealthSense.

== Early life ==
He was brought up in Surrey. His German Jewish father, Hans Rosenbluth, fled Germany in 1933 soon after the Nazis came to power. In 1940 Rosenbluth was interned as an ‘enemy alien‘ and sent from England to Australia on HMT Dunera. When allowed to return, Rosenbluth changed his name to John Caryl Ross and joined the British Army’s Pioneer Corps; he became an officer in 1945. Nick Ross's paternal grandfather was Pinhas Rosen, first justice minister of Israel.

Ross went to Wallington County Grammar School and then read psychology at Queen's University Belfast. He graduated with a BA (Hons), later became a Doctor of the university (honoris causa) and he was deputy president of the Student Union and a leader of the student civil rights movement in 1968 and 1969. He started in journalism by reporting on the violence in Belfast for BBC Northern Ireland.

== Career ==
He began working part-time for the BBC in Northern Ireland while still a student and reported on the violence as the Troubles became acute. He returned to London and presented British radio programmes such as Radio 4's The World at One, PM and The World Tonight, and moved to TV in 1976 as a reporter for Man Alive on BBC Two. He made several documentaries in a brief stint as a director and producer. "The Biggest Epidemic of Our Times" was a polemic on road accidents which was made for Man Alive but transferred to BBC1. It was later described as a broadcast that "would transform road safety," and according to another commentator, by reframing the whole concept of road safety Ross's campaigning changed public attitudes and public policy to such an extent that, "in significant consequence British mortality rates of people under 50 are among the lowest in the world." Ross also produced and directed two programmes on drug addiction, The Fix and The Cure, which followed an addict called Gina. He presented a law series Out of Court in this period as well as large-scale studio debates.

He was on the presenting team of a short-lived early-evening news programme Sixty Minutes which began in 1983, and was intended as a replacement for Nationwide, but proved an unwieldy format. In the same period he was a founder presenter of the BBC's Breakfast Time on BBC 1, the first regular such programme in this timeslot, from its launch in early 1983, with Frank Bough and Selina Scott, as well as launching Watchdog as a prime time stand-alone consumer series.

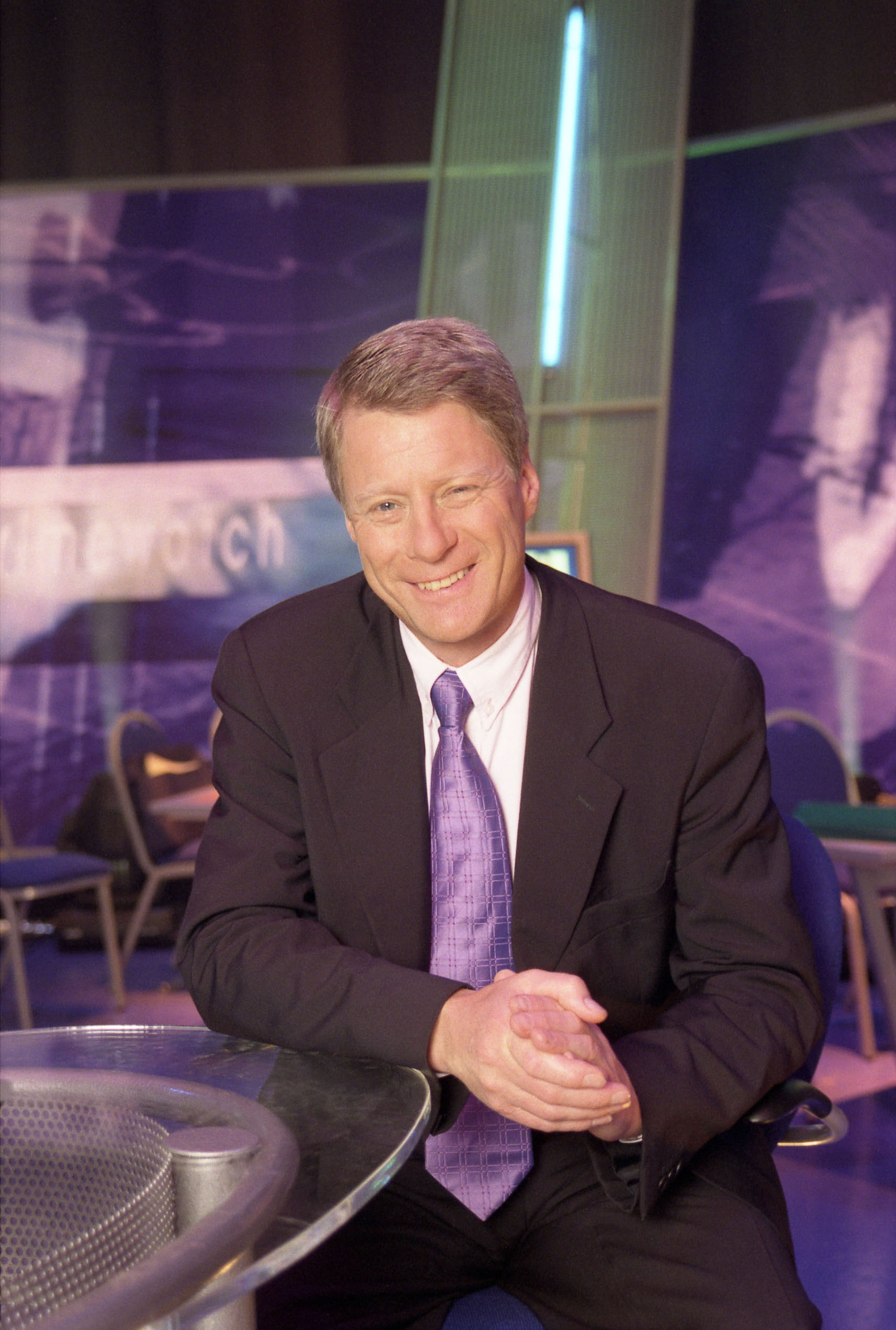
Ross in the BBC Crimewatch studio

Crimewatch (based on a German prototype) began in 1984, and made him a household name in the UK and his regular sign-off, "Don't have nightmares, do sleep well", became a well-known catch-phrase. In 1989 he was asked to present BBC Radio 4's Tuesday morning phone-in, the name of which was changed from Tuesday Call to Call Nick Ross. He resigned in 1997, but received an award as best radio presenter of the year. During the 1991 Gulf War he was a volunteer presenter on the BBC Radio 4 News FM service.

He presented A Week in Politics on Channel 4, then moved to cover BBC Two's live broadcasts of parliament in Westminster with Nick Ross. At one stage in the 1990s he was often doing three mainstream live programmes a day such as Call Nick Ross, Westminster with Nick Ross and Crimewatch. He was used in a variety of BBC formats including chat shows, travel programmes and debates, but was most at home in live studios, often orchestrating debates.

His Crimewatch co-presenter, Jill Dando, was murdered in 1999 and Ross started a campaign to commemorate her, culminating in the establishment of the Jill Dando Institute of Crime Science at University College London.

In 2000 Ross presented a general knowledge quiz called The Syndicate, aired on BBC 1 which pitted two teams across three rounds on general knowledge.

In late 2007, Ross left Crimewatch, soon followed by his co-presenter Fiona Bruce. The replacement presenter, Kirsty Young, was 21 years younger than Ross and the BBC were accused of ageism over these changes. His 23 years as the main Crimewatch anchor marks him as one of the longest-serving presenters of a continuous series in TV history.

He spent a year creating a major BBC One series The Truth About Crime, which aired in mid-2009 and explained the fall in crime rates and how offending can be reduced further. The show was described by The Times as an "outstanding... sane, insightful and compellingly argued documentary series."

He has since been making other TV shows, such as Secrets of the Crime Museum and science programmes for BBC Radio 4 including an acclaimed re-examination of the Chernobyl disaster Fallout: the Legacy of Chernobyl. His written journalism has included a re-examination of the Air France Flight 447 air crash that provoked controversy on both sides of the Atlantic.

He made a guest appearance on Are You Being Served?, playing himself in the last episode "The Pop Star", broadcast in April 1985, and has appeared on other shows, including Have I Got News for You.

Ross was appointed Commander of the Order of the British Empire (CBE) in the 2021 Birthday Honours for services to broadcasting, charity and crime prevention.

He is played by Oliver Milburn in the 2025 ITV drama about the News International phone hacking scandal, The Hack.

== Activities away from broadcasting ==
Away from broadcasting Ross has a wide range of philanthropic involvements, centred on medical ethics as well as promoting science and evidence-led health-care. He has also played a leading role in social action campaigns, most notably crime prevention, road safety and fire safety.

Ross coined the term Crime Science to promote a practical, multidisciplinary and outcome-focused approach to crime reduction (as distinct from what he claimed was often theory-driven criminology). The Jill Dando Institute which he inspired has grown to have a substantial role in University College London, spawning a new Department of Security and Crime Science and other offshoots including a Forensic Science unit and a secure data lab. Ross is chairman of the board of the institute, a visiting professor, and an Honorary Fellow of University College London, as well as an Honorary Fellow of the Academy of Experimental Criminologists. His crime science concept has since been adopted in universities elsewhere, including New York, Cincinnati and Texas, with formal crime science courses at Loughborough in the UK and at Twente University in the Netherlands. The British Ministry of Defence DSTL has a fast-growing crime science unit and there have been plans to create a crime science department at the University of Manchester.

Ross has written several books including Crime, how to solve it and why so much of what we're told is wrong, and is President of the British Security Industries Association.

He has served on several government committees (including the Committee on the Ethics of Gene Therapy, the Gene Therapy Advisory Committee, the NHS National Plan Task Force, the National Crime Prevention Board and the Crime Prevention Agency Board). He was a member of the Nuffield Council on Bioethics 1999–2005 and a member of the council's Working Party on Ethics of research involving animals (2003–2005).

Ross contributed the foreword to Edzard Ernst's 2013 book on complementary and alternative medicine, Healing, Hype or Harm?: A Critical Analysis of Complementary or Alternative Medicine. Ross described himself as a 'sceptic' but 'not a cynic' and that 'pseudomedicine should be exposed for what it is'. Ross campaigned against Lord Maurice Saatchi's Medical Innovation Bill. Ross spoke against the bill in a 2015 debate hosted by HealthWatch, saying that "Uncoordinated trial and error on individual patients will never cure cancer and even if it did we would never know because these aren't controlled conditions...There is a long roll call of dishonour where lack of systematic science did harm".

Ross is an Honorary Fellow of the Royal College of Physicians, and of the Royal College of Surgeons, a Life Fellow of the Royal Society of Medicine and a non-executive director of Imperial College Healthcare NHS Trust. He has been a member of the Committee on Public Understanding of Science, chairman of the Royal Society Prizes for Science Books (twice), Guest Director of the Cheltenham Science Festival, chairman of the National Road Safety Committee of RoSPA and President of the London Road Safety Council, and an affiliate of the James Lind Alliance. He is Chairman of the Wales Cancer Bank Advisory Board, a member of the ethics committee of UK Biobank, and a Trustee of Crimestoppers and of the UK Stem Cell Foundation. He was one of the founders of HealthSense (formerly HealthWatch), and in early 2026 he is the charity's president. He served on the board of Sense about Science from 2008 to 2023, was an adviser to Crime Concern and Victim Support, and served two terms as an Ambassador for the World Wide Fund for Nature (WWF) 2004–11.

He was president of the Kensington Society 2011-2023 and a patron of Prisoners Abroad (a registered charity which supports Britons detained overseas), and a range of other charities including the Animal Care Trust, British Wireless for the Blind Fund, Heartbeat, the Jewish Association for the Mentally Ill, the Kidney Research Aid Fund, the Myasthenia Gravis Association, the National Depression Campaign, Missing, NICHS, the Raynaud's & Scleroderma Association, Resources for Autism, SaneLine, the Simon Community Northern Ireland, and Young at Heart.

He has campaigned for sprinklers in social housing, chaired fire sector summits, lobbied ministers and was a critic of 'complacency' that led to mass fatalities in the Lakanal House and Grenfell Tower fires in London. In 2023 he was appointed chair of trustees of the National Fire Chiefs Council.

In 2003 he was tipped by The Sun newspaper as a candidate for Mayor of London, and his name was mentioned again for the 2008 election. Although he did not stand, he wrote a manifesto for London's evening paper and chaired one of the key public debates. In 2011 he was mentioned as a possible police and crime commissioner.

In 2012 it was reported that he had sold his home in Notting Hill, West London "for almost 40 times the price he paid for it" in 1993. The buyer of the house was Khalid Saïd, son of businessman Wafic Saïd.

Ross works as a chairman and moderator for corporate and government meetings. His wife Sarah Caplin, co-founder of ChildLine, was Deputy Secretary of the BBC and also a senior executive with ITV, the British commercial television broadcaster.

== Filmography ==
| Year | Title | Channel |
|---|---|---|
| 1971–1972 | Scene Around Six | BBC One Northern Ireland |
| 1972–1974 | The World Tonight | BBC Radio 4 |
| 1972–1974 | Newsdesk | BBC Radio 4 |
| 1973 | Newsbeat | BBC Radio 1 |
| 1974–1975 | The World at One | BBC Radio 4 |
| 1976–1983 | Man Alive | BBC Two |
| 1977–1982 | Out of Court | BBC Two |
| 1983–1984 | Breakfast Time | BBC One |
| 1983–1984 | Sixty Minutes | BBC One |
| 1985 | Are You Being Served? | BBC One |
| 1984–2007 | Crimewatch | BBC One |
| 1985 | Watchdog | BBC One |
| 1986 | Star Memories | BBC One |
| 1986 | Drug Alert | BBC Radio 4 |
| 1986–1988 | A Week in Politics | Channel 4 |
| 1986–1997 | Call Nick Ross | BBC Radio 4 |
| 1988–2000 | Crimewatch File | BBC One |
| 1992–1994 | Crime Limited | BBC One |
| 1994–1997 | Westminster with Nick Ross | BBC Two |
| 1997 | Party Conferences | BBC Two |
| 1997 | Election Campaign | BBC Two |
| 1997–2005 | The Commission | BBC Radio 4 |
| 1998 | Newsnight | BBC Two |
| 1999–2006 | Crimewatch Solved | BBC One |
| 1999–2002 | So You Think You're A Good Driver | BBC One |
| 1999 | We Shall Overcome | BBC Northern Ireland |
| 1999 | Nick Ross | BBC Two |
| 1999 | Trail of Guilt | BBC One |
| 1999 | Storm Alert | BBC One |
| 1999–2000 | The Search | BBC One |
| 2000 | The Syndicate | BBC One |
| 2000 | Destination Nightmares | BBC One |
| 2002 | Jimmy Young Show | BBC Radio 2 |
| 2002 | Cracking Crime Day | BBC One |
| 2004 | The Archive Hour | BBC Radio 4 |
| 2008 | Secrets of the Crime Museum | History Channel UK |
| 2009 | The Truth About Crime | BBC One |
| 2010 | Crime Hotspots | BBC Radio 4 |
| 2011 | Fallout: The Legacy of Chernobyl | BBC Radio 4 |

== Bibliography ==
- Crimewatch UK (with Sue Cook, Hodder & Stoughton, 1987) ISBN 9780340405413
- Crime: How To Solve It, and Why So Much of What We're Told Is Wrong (Biteback, 2013) ISBN 9781849544993

=== By others ===
- Edzard Ernst: Healing, Hype or Harm?: A Critical Analysis of Complementary or Alternative Medicine (foreword by Nick Ross, Societas, 2008) ISBN 9781845401184
- Hugh Miller: Crimewatch Solved: The Inside Story (foreword by Nick Ross, Boxtree, 2001) ISBN 9780752220031
