= Sarah Caplin =

British producer and television executive (born 1954)

- Born: London, England
- Occupations: Journalist, producer, executive
- Spouse: Nick Ross
- Children: 3

Sarah Patricia Ann Caplin (born March 1954) is a British producer and television executive, formerly at ITV, and before that Deputy Secretary of the BBC, who has helped create two national charities, one for children and one for older people. She was a founder of Childline, together with her cousin Esther Rantzen and also The Silver Line. She was educated at the University of York and is married to TV presenter Nick Ross.

== Television credits ==
Caplin joined the BBC as a graduate trainee in 1980 and worked as a researcher on a variety of current affairs and factual entertainment programmes. As a producer her credits include ChildWatch, which involved the creation of a helpline, which in turn developed into ChildLine. Caplin was also responsible for Drugwatch, which featured an appearance by the Princess of Wales as well as Crime The Shocking Truth and the pilot for Crimewatch. In 1989 she was appointed Editor of Watchdog, and was responsible for hiring Anne Robinson as the presenter. In 1995 she was appointed Deputy Secretary of the BBC and in 1997 was headhunted to join Granada TV as the Editor of This Morning.

Caplin quit after three months. She was promoted to head of development for Granada Factual North and in 2000 was appointed Head of Features. Among the shows she created are 60 Minute Makeover, several series with Jade Goody and the Royal Navy, and House of Horrors.

Caplin left ITV in March 2011.

Caplin subsequently helped Esther Rantzen set up The Silver Line, a charity for older people, and was Director of Policy and Communications.
