= Seren Network =

Welsh educational organisation

- Rhywdwaith Seren
- Formation: November 2015; 10 years ago
- Founder: Lord Murphy
- Type: Governmental organization
- Region served: Wales
- Members: 2000 (2018)
- Parent organization: Department for Education and Skills (Wales)
- Subsidiaries: Local Hubs
- Website: serennetwork.blog.gov.wales

The Seren Network is a set of eleven regional hubs in Wales to help sixth-formers in Welsh state schools to get into Russell Group universities. It was formed by the Labour Welsh government in 2015 in response to a fall in Welsh students applying to Oxbridge. It includes around 2000 students.

== Foundation ==
Lord Murphy

=== Murphy report ===
From 2008 to 2012 the number of Welsh students admitted to Oxbridge fell from 96 to 76. As a result, the politician Paul Murphy MP, who had studied history at Oriel College, Oxford, was asked by Education Secretary Leighton Andrews to become Wales's "Oxbridge Ambassador" and produce a report on the issue in 2013. Murphy took advice from Cambridge's Master of Magdalene College, Rowan Williams and Senior Tutor of Churchill College, Richard Partington. His team included seconded staff from both universities and their work involved comparing admissions between Wales and North East England. When published in 2014, the report commended the example of Swansea HE+, a consortium hub based in Gower College Swansea, partnered with Churchill College. The report recommended that the Welsh Government "Establish a network of hubs including pilot regions." The report recommended that 12 hubs be established, and that alumni be used as speakers to encourage applications.

=== Pilot ===
In response, hubs were piloted immediately in certain regions by the new Education Secretary, Huw Lewis. The nationwide network was then formally established in November 2015, with a broader mandate to encourage applications to all top universities. It consisted of 11 hubs, targeting not only Oxbridge but also more broadly the Russell Group and Sutton Trust 30 leading UK Universities, as well as institutions abroad such as Yale and Harvard.

== Activities ==
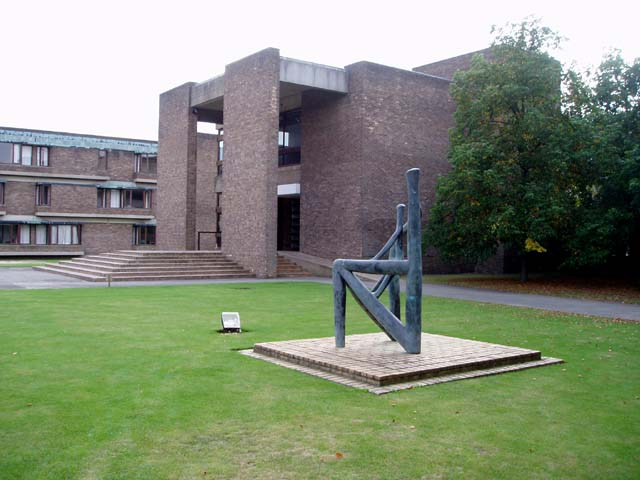
Main entrance and Dhruva Mistry sculpture of Churchill College

=== Ambassadors ===
Initially, the network held a conference in December 2015 to launch the network and for teachers to share information. They then appealed for Welsh graduates from top universities to act as ambassadors and talk at the network's events. Those who responded included Sian Lloyd, a BBC News correspondent who studied law at the University of Leicester; Gareth Davies, Chairman of the Welsh Rugby Union; Ciaran Jenkins, a journalist at Channel 4 who studied music at Fitzwilliam College, Cambridge; and Chris Bryant, a Member of Parliament who studied at Mansfield College, Oxford.

=== Access fellows ===
The network's hubs have arranged talks and workshops from universities' lecturers and access fellows to encourage Welsh university applications. From Cambridge University Seren specifically works with Churchill College in South Wales and Magdalene College in North Wales. Similarly, at Oxford University the network liaises with Jesus College, Lady Margaret Hall and St Peter's College.

=== Conferences ===
The network's first national conference for Year 12 students was held in Newtown, Powys in March 2017. 800 students attended to meet representatives from universities including Oxford, Cambridge, King's College, London and Imperial College, London. A further conference took place in December 2017, attended by 1200 students and 30 universities. The conferences continue annually every December in Newtown.

== Summer Schools ==
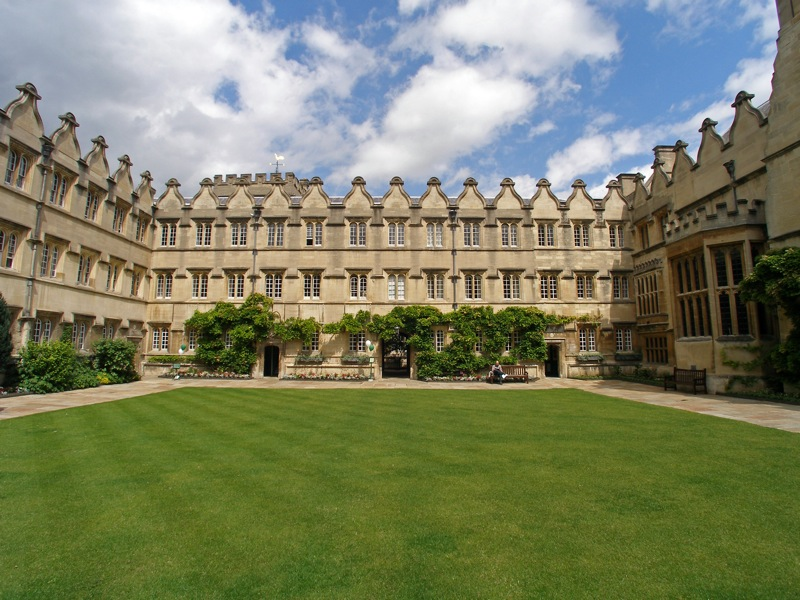
The second quad of Jesus College

=== Jesus College ===
Jesus College in Oxford continued its longstanding Welsh connection in 2017 by partnering with the Seren network to provide a summer school for 22 Welsh year twelve students. It lasted for four days in August, with College Principal Nigel Shadbolt saying "This new initiative will help ensure that we continue to welcome future generations of talented Welsh students here in Oxford." In 2018 the summer school was expanded to 75 students. Of those, 41 of went on to apply to Oxford, with 11 receiving offers. In May 2019, Jesus College announced that an alumnus had donated £625,000 to endow places at the summer school, which ran again in August 2019.

=== United States ===
A similar jointly-funded plan was launched in 2018 with Yale University, with the aim of giving 11 students in the Seren Network free places on the Yale Young Global Scholars summer school. Eventually 16 students received funded places in 2018. One of these students, from Fitzalan High School in Cardiff, later received a place at Harvard University. The summer school was expanded to 30 funded places across its 3 cohorts for 2019.

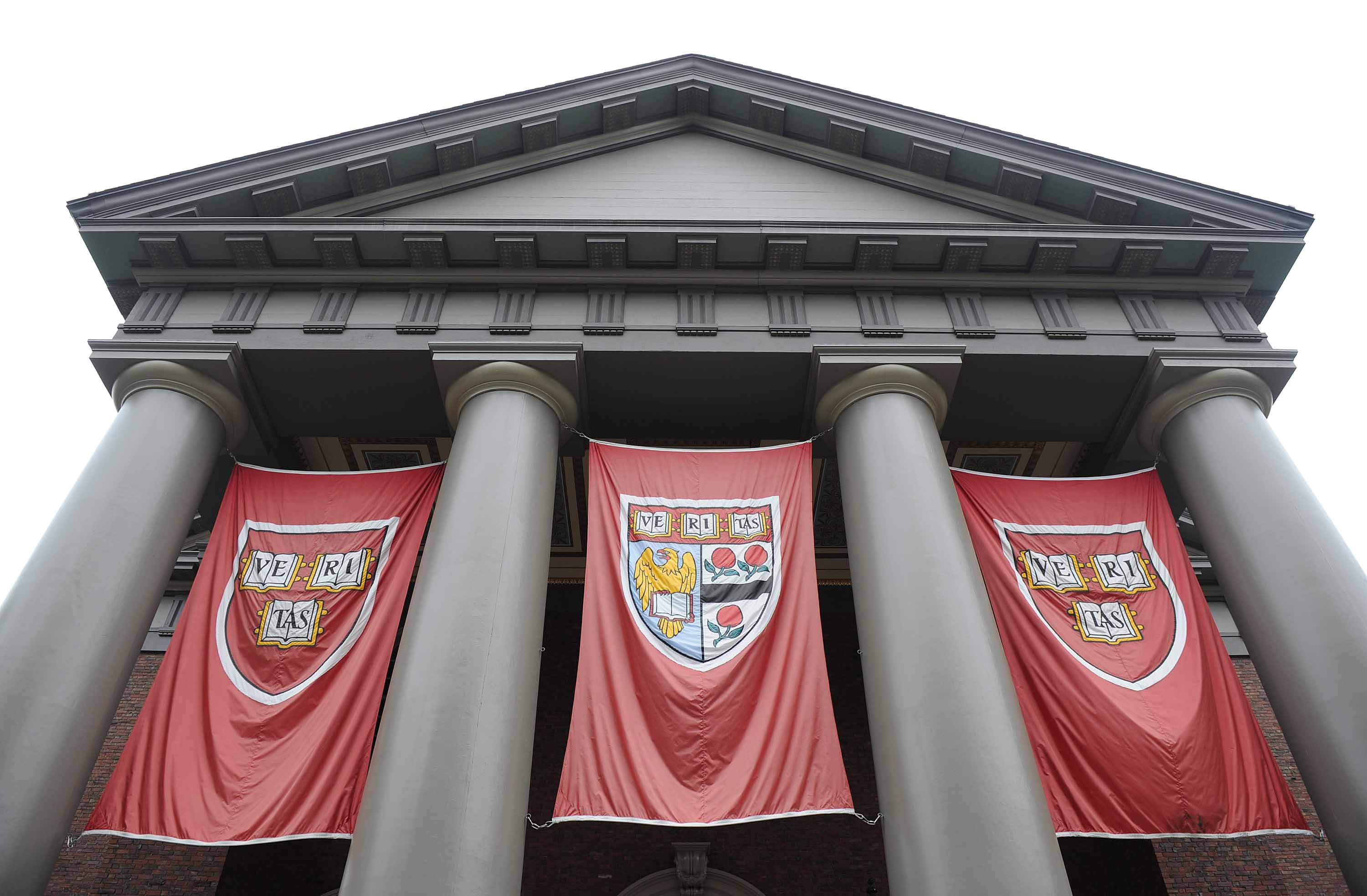
Harvard University

In 2019, Harvard University also partnered with the Seren Network for a jointly-funded scheme making scholarship places available for 5 students to attend Harvard Summer School's pre-college programme.

== Performance ==
In 2017, the Welsh government suggested that 95% of Seren network students were planning to apply to Russell Group universities. However, the network has been criticised by Plaid Cymru's Siân Gwenllian for not focusing on higher education "institutions here in Wales," and by the Conservative Party's Angela Burns as an "easy alternative" to the "unapologetic drive to raise exam performance" she felt was needed. The Seren Network's effectiveness in relation to Oxbridge has also been examined by the Welsh Affairs Select Committee of the British House of Commons.

=== Evaluation report ===
In February 2018, a report into the performance of the network was published, finding that "Seren has been able to add value" overall. Education Secretary Kirsty Williams stated that the report demonstrated "considerable early success," but Government World magazine noted recommendations that the network become more consistent across Wales and be extended to younger students. Following the report, Williams announced that a pilot project extending Seren Network provision to students before their GCSEs, beginning in September 2018.
