= The Syndicate (game show) =

British game show

- Genre: Game show
- Presented by: Nick Ross
- Theme music composer: Philip Pope
- Country of origin: United Kingdom
- Original language: English
- No. of series: 1
- No. of episodes: 15

Production
- Production location: Fountain Studios
- Running time: 30 minutes
- Production company: Bazal

Original release
- Network: BBC One
- Release: 26 June – 15 September 2000

The Syndicate is a British game show that aired on BBC One from 26 June to 15 September 2000 and was hosted by Nick Ross. It was seen as the BBC's attempt to rival ITV's Who Wants to Be a Millionaire?.

Mark Labbett, who is now known for being a Chaser on The Chase, appeared on this show.

== Game Format ==
The game is played between two teams (called "syndicates," hence the show title). Each team consists of four players; one is the captain, while the other three are "syndicate members."

=== "The First Skirmish" ===
Each team is asked questions in an alternating format. The team captain is given a category, and selects which member of their team will answer the question, whether themselves or another player. The player answering the question has seven seconds to answer. If that player answers correctly, the team scores 10 points. An incorrect answer or no answer eliminates that player. If at least one player has been eliminated and a correct answer is given, the captain may choose to reinstate an eliminated player instead of taking the points.

The captain cannot be eliminated at any point. If the captain chooses to take a question themselves and answers incorrectly, they must choose one of their teammates to be eliminated in their place.

If the captain has no teammates left and misses a question, their team loses 10 points; scores may go below zero.

Each team is asked eight questions in the round.

=== "The Swot Round" ===
One hour before the start of the program, each team nominates a specialist subject; the teams are asked questions on their opponents' specialist subject in this round. The teams are allowed to use the internet, reference books, and the telephone to study the specialist subject assigned to them by the other team.

Each team is asked 10 questions on the subject assigned to them by their opponents. The captain may confer with any teammates currently active, but must give the team's answer. As in the first round, the team has seven seconds to answer each question.

If the team answers the question correctly, the captain may either score 10 points or reinstate an eliminated teammate. If the team answers incorrectly, then the team who nominated the subject is asked the question. If the nominating team answers correctly, they may choose an opponent to eliminate; if they answer incorrectly, then they must choose one of their own teammates to eliminate.

As before, if a captain has to eliminate a teammate, but has no teammates to eliminate, they lose 10 points instead.

=== "The Final Contest" ===
Play begins with the trailing team. As in the previous round, the host asks the captain a question, and the captain may confer with any active teammates, but must give the team's answer. In this round, teams have five seconds to answer each question; if a correct answer is given, the captain may choose to score 10 points, reinstate an eliminated teammate, or eliminate an opposing player. A team keeps control of the game as long as they continue to answer questions correctly; when they give an incorrect answer or no answer, control passes to the opposing team.

A klaxon sounds when three minutes remain in the game. At that point, the action is paused, and each captain is given the option to sell active teammates (if any are active), eliminating them from further play, with a bonus of 30 points for each teammate sold, or to buy back eliminated players (if they have any eliminated teammates) at a cost of 30 points per player. A captain who buys back eliminated players may have their score reduced below zero.

Once the captains make their decisions of whether to buy or sell teammates, or to keep their teams as-is, the teams are locked for the rest of the game; no further reinstatements or eliminations can take place, and the captain always scores 10 points on a correct answer; For the last three minutes of the game, answering time is reduced to four seconds.

A siren sounds to indicate that time has expired. The team in the lead at that point wins the game.
