= Independent Safeguarding Authority =

Former UK child protection agency

Logo of the Independent Safeguarding Authority

The Independent Safeguarding Authority (ISA) was a non-departmental public body for England, Northern Ireland and Wales, that existed until 1 December 2012, when it merged with the Criminal Records Bureau (CRB) to form the Disclosure and Barring Service.

The ISA was created by the Labour Government 2007–2010. The tabloid media campaign and the decision to set up the ISA followed an inquiry headed by Sir Michael Bichard that was set up in the wake of the Soham murders. The ISA was to oversee a new Vetting and Barring Scheme in England, Wales and Northern Ireland, which was to have required all those working with vulnerable groups to undergo an enhanced vetting procedure before being allowed to commence any relevant duties.

On 15 June 2010, the new coalition government Home Secretary Theresa May announced that plans under which all new applicants for jobs working with children and the vulnerable along with those changing posts would have to register with the Independent Safeguarding Authority were being halted and that the Vetting and Barring Scheme would be severely "scaled back". This will save the UK taxpayer around £100 million a year. The Home Secretary went on to say that the protection of children and vulnerable adults would from here on focus upon "common sense" rather than the measures Labour introduced. She said that "what we have got to do is actually trust people again [and that the philosophy behind the setting up of the ISA was based upon an assumption that] you were assumed to be guilty, in a sense, until you were proven innocent and told you were able to work with children."

A review into the Vetting and Barring Scheme was published on 11 February 2011. This made recommendations for the merger of the Criminal Records Bureau and Independent Safeguarding Authority into one non-departmental public body, responsible for barring individuals and completing criminal record checks. Under the Protection of Freedoms Act, the new scheme will not require registration, nor in most cases will any details be retained on a database. The exception will be for those who are barred, whether this be on the basis of a crime or on the basis of 'soft intelligence', e.g. a dismissal by an employer. This has led to continued criticism from a variety of organizations.

== Background ==
The Bichard report was published on 22 June 2004 and made 31 recommendations, of which recommendation 19 called for a new registration scheme and stated:

"New arrangements should be introduced requiring those who wish to work with children, or vulnerable adults, to be registered. This register – perhaps supported by a card or licence – would confirm that there is no known reason why an individual should not work with these client groups. The new register would be administered by a central body, which would take the decision, subject to published criteria, to approve or refuse registration on the basis of all the information made available to them by the police and other agencies. The responsibility for judging the relevance of police intelligence in deciding a person’s suitability would lie with the central body"

Of note in this recommendation is the use of the double-negative, "no known reason why an individual should not work with these client groups". This to say the ISA from its inception was not designed to clear individuals as "suitable" for work with vulnerable groups but to remove those who pose a known risk.

Proposals to implement the recommendations were put to public consultation on 5 April 2005. The results of this exercise were announced by the Rt Hon Ruth Kelly, the Secretary of State of the Department for Education and Skills, on 19 January 2006 and were translated into primary legislation, the Safeguarding Vulnerable Groups Act 2006, which received royal assent on 8 November 2006. Within the act the ISA is referred to as the Independent Barring Board; it had been known as the ISA since August 2007, but was only formally renamed following royal assent for the Policing and Crime Bill in 2009. The Safeguarding Vulnerable Groups Act only covers England and Wales but comparable legislation has been passed to cover Northern Ireland and Scotland. The Department for Children, Schools and Families, as it was then known held further consultations.

== The Safeguarding Vulnerable Groups Act ==
Along with creating the ISA, the Safeguarding Vulnerable Groups Act 2006 defines two categories of work (whether paid or not) that fall within the scope of the Act: regulated and controlled activity.

=== Regulated activity ===
Regulated activity is the primary area of work covered by the Act and broadly deals with all those who have direct contact with vulnerable groups. Specifically, regulated activity covers any activity which involves contact with children or vulnerable adults and is of a specified nature (e.g. teaching, training, care, supervision, advice, treatment or transport); or any activity allowing contact with children or vulnerable adults and is in a specified place (e.g. school, Children's home, etc.). For the activity to be regulated activity it must take place on a frequent or intensive basis. Regulated activity also covers fostering and childcare (but not adoption). A "child" is defined as anyone under 18, except in employment settings, where the age limit is 16.

In addition, there are a number of defined "office holders" position, where a prescribed post-holder is deemed as engaging in regulated activity irrespective of their actual contact with vulnerable groups. This list includes such people as a Local Authority Director of Children's Services, trustees of children's charities and school governors.

No distinction is made between paid and voluntary work.

==== What regulated activity means ====
The duties and responsibilities under regulated activity where an organisation is providing the activity are that:

- A barred individual must not undertake regulated activity
- To undertake regulated activity an individual must be ISA-registered
- An employer must not engage in regulated activity a barred person or a person who is not ISA-registered
- An employer must check that a prospective employee who is in regulated activity is ISA-registered
- Personal and family relationships are not covered

==== Exemptions from ISA registration ====
Although it is a serious criminal offence to engage in regulated activity while barred from doing so, not all individuals who engage in regulated activity are required to register with the ISA. A prominent example are those involved in "domestic employment". Individuals are not required to register with the ISA where they are employed by parents to work with their children or where a vulnerable adult arranges for individuals to provide care in their own homes. Examples of domestic employment would include groups such as private tutors when employed directly by parents or individuals involved in the direct payments scheme. The policy on this was confirmed in the Government's Response to the ISA scheme Consultation Document in May 2008.

=== Controlled activity ===
Controlled activity is a much more limited area of work and is tightly defined under the Safeguarding Vulnerable Groups Act. Controlled activity applies to:

- Ancillary support workers in National Health Service and Further Education settings (e.g. cleaner, caretaker, catering staff, receptionist) with frequent or intensive contact with children or vulnerable adults.
- Those working for specified organisations (e.g. a local authority) with frequent access to sensitive records about children.

It is mandatory to check the ISA registration status of individuals in controlled activity; although it is possible to employ a barred person, providing sufficient safeguards have been put in place.

== Vetting and Barring Scheme, the original structure and design ==
The ISA was to have functioned as the decision-making element of the new Vetting and Barring Scheme, with the application process and monitoring functions being run by the Criminal Records Bureau. It largely retains these functions but from 2012 will be entirely merged with the CRB. Once operational the Vetting and Barring Scheme as originally designed would have required all those engaged in regulated or controlled activity to register and have their registration status checked. It would not have been possible to 'opt-out' of the Scheme and there would have been criminal offences for non-compliance on both the employer and employee. These now only apply in the case where a barred individual seeks or attains work.

Those successful in the original application process would have been provided with a unique reference number and employers would have had to verify potential employee's membership before allowing them to commence their duties; via a free online check. Estimates at the time stated that the number who would have been required to register would have been approximately 11.3 million people (or a quarter of the adult population). This was criticised in the press in 2009 as a proposal to create the most intrusive database ever created in a democracy. As described later these initial proposals were then withdrawn after this press hostility, led to the government creation of the Singleton Review (2009) and a subsequent review led by Eileen Munro (2010).

The cost of registration was originally set at £64 per person except for volunteers for whom it would have been free of charge. These fees were also withdrawn when the requirement to register was abandoned in 2010. At this point the ISA barred list was reshaped to be simply a list of those barred, accessible to employers and certain others, more akin to its predecessor 'list 99'.

The definition of volunteer remains that used by the CRB: "a volunteer is a person who is engaged in any activity which involves spending time, unpaid (except for travelling and other approved out-of-pocket expenses), doing something which aims to benefit someone (individuals or groups) other than or in addition to close relatives" -.

Other aspects of the original design have been retained since the Singleton Review. The ISA owns and maintains two lists (one covering the children's sector and one to cover the adults') of those barred from working with vulnerable groups, which replaced previous barred lists (List 99, the Protection of Children Act 1999 (PoCA), the scheme relating to the Protection of Vulnerable Adults (PoVA) and Disqualification Orders). Inclusion on these barred lists is as a result of either an automatic bar (following a police caution or conviction or following a discretionary bar, typically following dismissal, or resignation where dismissal was possible, following an act of gross misconduct at work, although there are other potential reasons. secondary legislation). These decisions are taken by the ISA.

The ISA base their decisions upon information from a range of sources including, but not limited to, that held by the police (both locally and that on the Police National Computer), local authorities, social services, regulatory organisations (such as the General Medical Council or the General Teaching Council for England) and supervisory authorities (such as Ofsted). They also receive cases directly from employers. Employer referrals constitute the largest number of cases considered for discretionary barring. They do not receive cases directly from individuals. Where cases are not clear, decisions are escalated within the ISA with final decisions being made by the board, which is chaired by former Chief Executive for Barnardo's, Roger Singleton.

The ISA are able to consider information other than that which has led to cautions or convictions. These can include unproven allegations from former employers, professional bodies, members of the public or stories in the press. However referral information, such as allegations, does not lead to automatic inclusion on the ISA Barred Lists; before a barring decision is made, the individual is given the information on which the decision is based and the opportunity to explain their case. However, there is no hearing process. This has caused some controversy see below. Case workers will be allowed to "undertake appropriate research" on "internet chatrooms or social networking websites", although the published guidance on the ISA's Decision Making Process and the Safeguarding Vulnerable Groups Act 2006 state that the ISA has to be satisfied that "relevant conduct" has occurred before being able to consider any other factor. The Safeguarding Vulnerable Groups Act 2006 defines relevant conduct as:

- conduct which endangers a child or is likely to endanger a child;
- conduct which, if repeated against or in relation to a child, would endanger that child or would be likely to endanger him;
- conduct involving sexual material relating to children (including possession of such material);
- conduct involving sexually explicit images depicting violence against human beings (including possession of such images), if it appears to the ISA that the conduct is inappropriate; or
- conduct of a sexual nature involving a child, if it appears to the ISA that the conduct is inappropriate.

The philosophic burden of proof to whether an event occurred is "on a balance of probability", as used in civil trials, rather than "beyond reasonable doubt" as required in criminal trials. Case assessment within which risk factors such as obsession with sex or violence, "presence of severe emotional loneliness and/or the inability to manage/sustain emotionally intimate relationships with age-appropriate adults", "links with anti-social peers", "presence of impulsive, chaotic, unstable lifestyle" or "using substances or sex to cope with stress" will only be considered in relation to the "relevant conduct".

Appeal against inclusion is by means of the Administrative Court (Judicial Review). A recent case demonstrates that that Court is minded to de-register an individual when the bar is not lawful or disproportionate: SB v Independent Safeguarding Authority [2011] UKUT 404 (AAC) (4 October 2011) This decision reflects similar decisions in family and criminal law regarding risk assessment after conviction for sexual offences.

== Comparison with CRB disclosures ==
The ISA barred lists performed a separate, albeit related, role to that of a CRB disclosure as the ISA decision-making process considered information relating to the potential risk an individual poses to vulnerable groups using sources that go beyond that held by the police; whereas a CRB disclosure may contain details of offences that may not lead to a bar (for example drink driving) but which may be pertinent to a given role (such as driving a school bus). ISA-registration does not replace CRB disclosures. From 2012 the ISA and CRB were merged into the Disclosure and Barring Service.

== Implementation ==
As of March 2009, elements of the Vetting and Barring Scheme had begun to be rolled out in stages, linked to a series of pieces of secondary legislation under the Safeguarding Vulnerable Groups Act 2006. The ISA came into existence on 2 January 2008 and after 31 March 2008 the ISA began advising ministers on barring decisions taken by ministers under current schemes. From 20 January 2009, barring decisions in England and Wales began to be taken by the ISA, taking responsibility from the Secretary of State and was extended to Northern Ireland from 13 March 2009. On 20 February 2009 detailed guidance on the ISA's decision-making process was published. From 12 October 2009, increased safeguards came into effect with around five million more jobs and voluntary positions – including most National Health Service jobs – covered by the barring arrangements. The additional safeguards are:

- Two barring lists administered by a single organisation, the Independent Safeguarding Authority (ISA), rather than the three lists previously maintained by two different Government departments: Protection of Children Act (POCA), Protection of Vulnerable Adults (PoVA) and List 99;
- The introduction of 'regulated activities' – people included in the new barred lists by the ISA are barred from a much wider range of jobs and activities than has been the case under previous arrangements. This is particularly so in areas of work with vulnerable adults such as the NHS.
- A new duty to share information – employers, social services and professional regulators have to notify the ISA of relevant information so individuals who pose a threat to vulnerable groups can be identified and barred from working with these groups; and
- New criminal offences – it is a criminal offence for a barred individual to seek or undertake work with vulnerable groups; and for employers knowingly to take them on.

The original intention had been that from 26 July 2010, all new entrants to roles working with vulnerable groups and those switching jobs to a new provider within these sectors would be able to register with the Vetting and Barring Scheme and be assessed by the ISA. Employers would have been able to check registration status online to subscribe to be notified if an employee's registration status changes. Both the ability and requirement to register were withdrawn in 2011 following the Singleton and Munro Reviews. The lists are still maintained and it remains an offence to employ a person in regulated activity who has been barred by the ISA or for that person to seek work.

== Initial criticism ==
Several prominent children's authors – who believed they would all be required to join the scheme in order to conduct talks in schools – have criticised the ISA. Philip Pullman called the scheme "outrageous, demeaning and insulting" and said he would no longer appear in schools because of it: "When you go into a school as an author or an illustrator you talk to a class at a time or else to the whole school. How on earth – how on earth – how in the world is anybody going to rape or assault a child in those circumstances? It's preposterous." Author and screenwriter Frank Cottrell Boyce said: "As an author you're never alone with a class. There's no possible reason for this, unless it's a revenue-raising scam." Former children's laureate Anne Fine said: "I refuse – having spoken in schools without incident for 32 years, I refuse to undergo such a demeaning process. It's all part of a very unhealthy situation that we've got ourselves into where all people who are close to children are seen as potential paedophiles." Lindsay Mackie, representing the literary charity English PEN, said: "The signal to children that the public space is to be defined as a potentially dangerous space – where the values of the worlds where the visitors work, whether it's in writing or engineering or family, are secondary to the definition of the adult as "vetted" or "safe" – is limiting and fearful. We are creating paranoia."

Others questioned the usefulness of the scheme, pointing out that it could not have prevented the Soham murders in the first place because the perpetrator, Ian Huntley, knew the victims through his girlfriend, not his job.

== The Singleton and Munro reviews ==
The critical media coverage when the scheme was launched in 2009 led to confusion over the registration requirements. The Singleton Review was set up due to concerns which had been expressed about the degree of contact with children which should trigger the requirement to register with the (ISA). Sir Roger Singleton, Chief Adviser on the Safety of Children and the Chair of the ISA, produced his 'Drawing the Line' report, to check that the Government had drawn the line in the right place in relation to the requirement to register. In December 2009 the Government accepted all of the recommendations found in 'Drawing the Line'.

The report included clarification in a number of areas:

- Frequent is defined as contact that takes place once a week or more often with the same children. (This was previously defined as an activity that happened once a month)
- Intensive is defined as contact that takes place on four days in one month or more with the same children or overnight. (Previously this was defined as three times in every 30 days or overnight)
- Mutually agreed and responsible arrangements made between parents and friends for the care of their children should not be affected by the Vetting and Barring Scheme
- Individuals who go into different schools or similar settings to work with different groups of children, should not be required to register unless their contact with the same children is frequent or intensive. (This clarification means that the concerns of the authors raised above were to some extent alleviated.)
- Exchange visits lasting less than 28 days, where overseas parents accept the responsibility for the selection of the host family, should be regarded as private arrangements and would not require registration.
- Overseas visitors bringing their own groups of children to the UK e.g. to international camps or the Olympics should have a three months exemption from the requirement to register.

The DCSF has published a Vetting and barring myth buster to further clarify the requirements of the scheme. However, this fact-sheet has been challenged as being rather simplistic and one-sided by several of the unions and professional associations that represent those most effected by the ISA. From 2009 onwards these organizations produced a large amount of documentation in the form of statements, conference resolutions and advice either clarifying or challenging the ISA's own publications. Some of these are referenced here, including some of those written by: the Royal College of Nursing (nurses union); National Union of Teachers (NUT), The National Association of Schoolmasters Union of Women Teachers (NASUWT) and Unison (the union for non-teaching staff in schools). Even as a small sample of responses from different unions and associations, there are significant differences within the opinions expressed and positions adopted, with the RCN and specific branches of the NASUWT seemingly taking the strongest oppositional stance. This perhaps indicates quite how complex the child protection debate in the UK currently is.

In 2010 the government, partly in response to pressure from those organizations mentioned above, launched a second review of the ISA led by Professor Eileen Munro of the Department of Social Policy, the London School of Economics and Political Science (LSE). Following this Munro review in 2011 the requirement to register was withdrawn entirely. It was also announced that the ISA would be merged with the CRB from 2012. The ISA's role is now to maintain lists that can be accessed by employers and certain other bodies of who is barred from working with either children or vulnerable adults.

== Criticisms 2009-2012 ==
These changes to some extent brought an end to the more virulent press criticisms of the ISA. However, they also led to some deeper questioning of the thinking behind the original creation of the ISA. Specific accusations have been that the government had overseen so many changes and reviews, showing a lack of support for the organization, as the ISA had initially been created as a knee jerk reaction to the Soham murders. Philip Pullman remains one of the most vociferous critics accusing the government of using the Soham murders as a 'scare story' to scare the British public into accepting such intrusive database.

The most visible opposition to the ISA came from the large nurses union, the Royal College of Nursing (RCN). This included successful legal cases brought by the RCN in 2010. Several journalists and campaigning organizations continued to voice criticism, including 'Civitas' and 'the Manifesto Club' run by the journalist Josie Appleton. Criticisms or concerns commonly raised regarding the structure of the Independent Safeguarding Authority included: a person can be barred without a hearing, there is no minimum standard of evidence, there is no legal support available to those who are 'minded to bar', right of appeal is limited, there is only a single sanction of barring for 10 years (for anyone aged over 25) and the refusal of the Independent Safeguarding Authority to use the word 'sanction' to describe the barring process. These formed the basis of the RCN's cases. These organizations continued to question the basis upon which the Independent Safeguarding Authority was created, asking whether a bureaucratic solution to child protection issues is realistic or sensible. The ISA was accused by its most vociferous critics in broadsheets such as the Guardian of being 'unethical' and 'Orwellian'. Both the RCN and these campaigning groups ask whether it creates further problems by creating a 'climate of fear' amongst professionals, while simultaneously creating 'an illusion of security'. amongst the public in general. To this end they have pointed out that recent cases of paedophile offences in schools such as those committed by Vanessa George in Plymouth – 2010 were not and could not have been prevented by any form of database as in these cases and others like them the offender had no previous criminal or disciplinary record. This debate seems likely to continue especially as neither the pro or anti viewpoint regarding the expansion of such systems has been claimed by any political party or conventional political standpoint right or left.

== See also ==
- Timeline of young people's rights in the United Kingdom
- Child protection
