= Gareth Davies (rugby union, born 1955) =

Wales and British and Irish Lions rugby union player

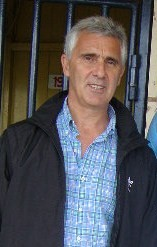
- Born: William Gareth Davies; 29 September 1955 (age 71) Tumble, Carmarthenshire, Wales
- School: Tumble Primary School Gwendraeth Grammar School
- University: University of Wales Institute of Science and Technology (UWIST); Oxford University

Rugby union career
- Position: Fly-half
Amateur team(s)
Years	Team	Apps	(Points)
1973	Tumble RFC		
1974-1975	Llanelli RFC	5	(23)
–	Oxford University RFC		
1974-1986	Cardiff RFC	362	(3117)
International career
Years	Team	Apps	(Points)
1978–1985	Wales	21	(38)
1980	British Lions	1	(8)

William Gareth Davies (born 29 September 1955) is a Welsh former rugby union player and former chairman of the Welsh Rugby Union. He played international rugby for Wales and the British Lions.

== Early and personal life ==
Born in the mining village of Tumble, Carmarthenshire, Davies was educated at nearby Gwendraeth Grammar School in Drefach near Llanelli. Davies was an all-round sportsman, representing Welsh schools at cricket and played for Glamorgan County Cricket Club's second XI. He then studied chemistry at the University of Wales Institute of Science and Technology (UWIST), later University of Wales, Cardiff, and later studied for his teaching qualifications at St Catherine's College, Oxford. Davies used this experience as an alumnus ambassador for the Seren Network.

Married to Fiona, Davies has two adult daughters.

== Rugby career ==
Davies started his rugby career at Tumble RFC and Gwendraeth Grammar School. He briefly played for Llanelli RFC whilst still at school before moving to Cardiff RFC for whom he played for 12 years, during the amateur era of rugby, representing the club in over 380 games and amassing 3500 points – still a club record. His drop-goal helped UWIST win the 1976 UAU Cup Final, beating University of Wales, Swansea, 6–4. He also represented Oxford in the 1977 Varsity Match.

During this time he gained 21 Welsh caps, captaining them five times, and winning a Triple Crown in 1979. He toured with the British Lions to South Africa in 1980, and injured his knee in the second test at Bloemfontein. He resigned from the Welsh team in 1985 after the number 10 shirt was listed as A.N. Other for the game against England at home at the Cardiff Arms Park, which allowed Jonathan Davies his first cap.

== Professional career ==
After retirement from rugby, he became assistant director of the CBI Wales, and then head of sport for BBC Wales from 1988. In 1994 he was appointed Chief Executive of Cardiff Athletic Club/Cardiff Rugby Football Club, where in 1995 he re-signed Jonathan Davies back from his time playing Rugby league as Rugby Union turned professional. In 1999 he joined S4C as Commissioning Editor for Sports and Events. He was also chairman of the Sports Council for Wales, and director of Welsh Affairs for the Royal Mail. In 2006 he joined the Welsh Development Agency, heading the Sydney, Australia office.

In January 2009 Davies was appointed as Dean at Leeds Metropolitan University. The Carnegie faculty provides courses in sport, education, languages and Events, tourism and hospitality, and in 2009 was named the UK Centre for Coaching Excellence, which will help coaches to develop the sporting stars of the future with the aim of making the UK become the leading coaching nation in the world by 2016. Davies is no longer Dean at Leeds Metropolitan University. In July 2014, Davies was nominated by Peter Thomas (owner of Cardiff RFC/Cardiff Blues) to succeed Gerald Davies on the board of the Welsh Rugby Union. Davies was elected Chairman of the WRU on 21 October 2014 and served in the position until October 2020, leaving the post after failing to gain re-election to the WRU National Council in September 2020.

Davies was awarded Honorary Doctorates from Cardiff Metropolitan University in 2015 and The University of South Wales in 2018 and is an Honorary Fellow of Cardiff University
