= Crimewatch Solved =

British crime series

- Genre: Factual
- Presented by: Nick Ross; Fiona Bruce; Tamzin Outhwaite; Kirsty Young; Matthew Amroliwala
- Country of origin: United Kingdom
- Original language: English
- No. of episodes: 13

Production
- Production location: Multiple location(s)
- Running time: 60 minutes

Original release
- Network: BBC One
- Release: 10 August 1999 – 1 September 2010

Related
- Crimewatch; Crimewatch Live; Crimewatch File; Crime Limited

Crimewatch Solved is a BBC television spin-off series from the BBC's Crimewatch. The first episode aired on BBC One in 1999 and was presented by Nick Ross. The final episode aired in September 2010 and was presented by Matthew Amroliwala.

== History ==
First aired on 10 August 1999, a new yearly programme called Crimewatch Solved was transmitted. It was the fourth spin-off from the main Crimewatch programme. Originally presented by Nick Ross, the series includes cases, features and reports of crimes which resulted in convictions.

A new edition was broadcast every year until 2010, when the thirteenth and final edition aired on 1 September 2010. Occasionally, episodes would review an entire high-profile case, such as an edition dedicated solely to the murder of Sarah Payne.

== Transmissions ==
Title	Airdate	Presenter(s)
Crimewatch: Solved	10 August 1999	Nick Ross
Crimewatch: Solved 2	12 October 1999	Nick Ross
Crimewatch: Solved 3	23 August 2000	Nick Ross; Fiona Bruce
Crimewatch: Solved 4	15 August 2001	Nick Ross; Fiona Bruce
Crimewatch: Solved 5	20 August 2003	Nick Ross; Fiona Bruce
Crimewatch: Solved 6	1 September 2004	Nick Ross; Fiona Bruce
Crimewatch: Solved 7	17 August 2005	Nick Ross; Fiona Bruce
Crimewatch: Solved 8	23 August 2006	Nick Ross; Fiona Bruce
Crimewatch: Solved 9	25 July 2007	Tamzin Outhwaite
Crimewatch: Solved 10	6 August 2008	Kirsty Young
Crimewatch: Solved 11	6 January 2009	Kirsty Young
Crimewatch: Solved 12	18 August 2009	Kirsty Young
Crimewatch: Solved 13	1 September 2010	Matthew Amroliwala

== See also ==
- Crimewatch
