= British Security Industry Association =

The British Security Industry Association (BSIA), based in Worcester, United Kingdom, is a British trade association founded in January 1967 in London. It represents the UK security industry through membership and educating the marketplace on the value of quality and professional security.

The BSIA represents a wide range of the security sector, with about 70% of the industry under its membership with members ranging from SMEs to international organisations. The organisation is currently separated into 14 sections and has a number of special interest groups ranging from AI, cyber security, HR & HSE, and more.

Mike Reddington was appointed as chief executive of the BSIA in January 2019, and Nick Ross was appointed president of the BSIA in 2023.
