= Ginny Buckley =

British television presenter (born 1968)

- Born: Virginia Louise Buckley; 1 April 1968 (age 58); Rochdale, England
- Occupations: Journalist, Television and radio presenter

Virginia Louise Buckley (born 1 April 1968 in Rochdale) is a British journalist, radio and television presenter.

== Early life ==
Buckley was born and brought up in Rochdale, England, before moving to Australia at the age of 18.

She started her career early, appearing regularly from the age of 12 for BBC local radio in Manchester, where she presented a children's radio programme. At the age of 12 she appeared on the BBC children's programme Multi-Coloured Swap Shop, where she interviewed Noel Edmonds, David Bellamy and the pop group Sad Café.

Buckley also worked as an actress appearing in numerous plays for BBC Radio and studied Performance Arts and Media Studies at Oldham's Grange Arts Centre.

== Broadcasting career ==
At the age of 18, Buckley moved to Australia; she lived in Sydney and worked for several years in commercial radio. She worked as a junior in the newsroom at 2UW and later at Triple M, first in the news room and then as a producer for the show Club Veg.

She went on to become a reporter for the children's television program C'mon Kids for the Nine Network in Australia during its 1990-1991 incarnation.

In 1991, after returning to England, Buckley was a co-presenter with Ross King on the BBC TV Children's game show "The Wetter The Better" recorded at the Sandcastle Leisure Centre in Blackpool. She worked for Granada Television in Manchester, where she was a reporter on the regional news programme Granada Tonight. She also presented ITV's Bodycheck and Taste for Travel.

In 2001, Buckley joined the BBC One travel programme Holiday first as a reporter and later as the main anchor, following on from Craig Doyle. She left in 2005 when she was replaced by Lawrence Llewelyn-Bowen. She also presented the BBC One spin-off programme Holiday 10 Best.

Buckley returned to her news background in 2005 when she joined Sky News (2005–07), anchoring their afternoon output. In a memorable blooper during her time at Sky, she mistakenly introduced playwright Harold Pinter as "Howard Pintus", saying that he was joining her in the studio, then correcting herself to announce that he had died. He had in fact won the Nobel Prize in Literature.

Buckley has also presented a BBC Two documentary on the environmental impact of travel, entitled Should I Really Give Up Flying and regularly presents the flagship ITV1 Current Affairs programme Tonight.

In June 2010, she co-hosted Crimewatch Roadshow on BBC One alongside Rav Wilding.

For three years she was presenter of the internet car review site, Carbuyer and appeared in weekly car review videos for Carbuyer's YouTube channel alongside journalist and presenter Mat Watson and then James Batchelor.

In 2014 she joined the reporting team for the consumer programme Watchdog on BBC One and in 2015 became one of the presenters on the BBC's Escape to the Country.

Buckley became the Founder and CEO of Electrifying.com - a multi-channel media platform fronted by three TV presenters and journalists: founder Ginny Buckley, Nicki Shields and Tom Ford. It was launched in March 2020 after assembling a team of electric and alternatively fuelled vehicle experts with decades of years of experience in the automotive sector for consumers seeking jargon-free advice about the switch to electric cars.

In August 2022, Buckley presented Channel 4's Dispatches: Why Is My Car So Expensive?, where she reported on the rising cost of used and new car prices.

In January 2023, Buckley looked into the pros and cons of owning and operating an electric vehicle in an episode of Tonight called Your Car: Time to Switch?.

In May 2023, Buckley presented an episode of Tonight called All-Inclusive Holidays: Unpacked, in which she investigates the popularity of all-inclusive holidays.

== Acting ==
Buckley made her television acting debut in 2008, playing a newsreader on The Bill.

== Writing ==
Buckley went on to write regularly about cars and transport for many national newspapers and magazines and became the first female motoring editor of a national newspaper when she took on the role at the News of the World.

In January 2015 Buckley was announced as the new Motoring Editor for Good Housekeeping magazine in the UK. Buckley is a Juror for World Car of the Year Awards (WCOTY).

== Personal life ==
Buckley lives in Shiplake and is a mother of two sons, born 1986 and 2009. She is a supporter of Manchester United, and is a trustee of the club's charity, the Manchester United Foundation.
