= Crime Limited =

- Genre: Factual
- Presented by: Nick Ross; Sue Cook
- Country of origin: United Kingdom
- Original language: English
- No. of series: 3
- No. of episodes: 28

Production
- Production location: Multiple location(s)
- Running time: 45–60 minutes

Original release
- Network: BBC One
- Release: 28 April 1992 – 14 September 1994

Related
- Crimewatch; Crimewatch File

Crime Limited is a British television series that was a spin-off from the BBC's Crimewatch. The first series aired on BBC One over ten episodes in 1992 and was presented by Nick Ross and Sue Cook. A second series ran in 1993 and a third series ran in 1994.

== History ==
First aired on 28 April 1992, Crime Limited was the second spin-off from Crimewatch, described by producers as "a new ten-part series that takes the cameras behind the scenes of crime."

Presented by Nick Ross and Sue Cook, the series includes features and reports that Ross described as "[being unable to] form part of our appeal for information". Ross commented that, "Crime Limited gives us the chance to go into these stories. Some are exciting, some are reassuring and some are frankly funny. Some, we hope, will help to limit crime." Cook left Crime Limited after the first series, leaving Ross as the sole presenter for two further series, which aired in 1993 and 1994. The producers were Linda Cleeve and John Fothergill and it was edited by Nikki Cheetham. One of the show's episodes featured a prosecution-biased dramatization of the Florence Jackson murder case of 1992, whose outcome was later exposed as a miscarriage of justice.

== Transmissions ==
Series	Start date	End date	Episodes	Main presenter(s)	Co-presenter(s)
1	28 April 1992	30 June 1992	10	Nick Ross	Sue Cook
2	8 July 1993	2 September 1993	9	Nick Ross	—N/a
Special	22 November 1993		1	Nick Ross	—N/a
3	5 July 1994	14 September 1994	8	Nick Ross	—N/a

== See also ==
- Crimewatch
