= Tracker (2010 film) =

2010 film by Ian Sharp

- Film poster
- Directed by: Ian Sharp
- Written by: Nicolas Van Pallandt
- Starring: Ray Winstone; Temuera Morrison
- Distributed by: Kaleidoscope Entertainment (United Kingdom); Paramount Pictures (New Zealand)
- Release date: 12 September 2010 (TIFF)
- Running time: 103 minutes
- Countries: United Kingdom; New Zealand
- Language: English
- Budget: $6.5 million

Tracker is a 2010 British–New Zealand action-thriller film directed by Ian Sharp and starring Ray Winstone and Temuera Morrison. It is set in New Zealand in 1903.

== Plot ==
Arjan van Diemen is a renowned Afrikaner commando leader of the Second Boer War, and a master tracker. After the war, which ended in a British victory, he emigrates from South Africa to Auckland in the British colony of New Zealand. Upon arrival, he is recognised by Sergeant-Major Saunders, a British soldier who also fought in the Second Boer War, and is promptly arrested. Major Carlysle, also a British Boer War veteran, and the officer in charge of the British garrison in Auckland, respects van Diemen as a former opponent and releases him; Carlysle also knows that British soldiers burned down van Diemen's farm and killed his family.

Meanwhile, Kereama, a Māori harpooner on a whaling ship, sleeps with a prostitute in an army stable. A drunken Saunders arrives with two of his comrades, and becomes angry at a Māori coupling with a white woman. He and the other men beat and taunt Kereama, who fights back; in the confusion Saunders accidentally kills one of his own men, but evades responsibility by blaming Kereama. Kereama flees, knowing that he has no hope of a fair trial. After Saunders convinces a sceptical Carlysle of Kereama's guilt, Carlysle gathers a posse of soldiers to pursue Kereama, along with Bryce, a civilian tracker. Knowing of van Diemen's skills, Carlysle offers him a substantial reward to help them.

As they track Kereama, Bryce and van Diemen disagree over which way he has gone. Van Diemen takes a different path and eventually surprises and captures Kereama, while the soldiers follow a different trail and fall behind. Kereama persistently declares his innocence as van Diemen takes him back; notwithstanding their common traumas at the hands of the British, van Diemen refuses to release him, and they make their way back across the New Zealand landscape to return to the British garrison, with van Diemen revealing that, during the Boer War, he and his men would cut off the trigger fingers of British prisoners. Kereama escapes, but van Diemen catches up to him. The two fight, but Kereama gains the upper hand and almost kills van Diemen when the soldiers come upon them and recapture him. That night, having developed sympathy for Kereama, van Diemen subtly drops a knife, allowing him to free himself and escape once again.

In the morning, van Diemen denies that he aided Kereama and departs the company. The soldiers, now joined by Saunders, set out in pursuit of Kereama once more, now aiming to kill him since he is apparently armed with a rifle he made off with in the night, but which was in fact deliberately misplaced by Saunders, who still wants Kereama dead. Van Diemen continues to track Kereama, while setting a false trail for Bryce and the soldiers, knowing it will only mislead them briefly. He follows Kereama to the sacred place of his ancestors, high in the mountains. Kereama enters into a mountain cave to pray to his ancestors, while van Diemen prays for his dead family.

Having decided to help Kereama, van Diemen formulates a plan that will allow Kereama to leave New Zealand if they can avoid the soldiers. Unfortunately, Kereama falls and injures himself. Unable to run and boxed in by the soldiers, van Diemen offers him a pistol to fight them, but Kereama refuses, asking van Diemen to kill him as he does not want to die "hanging from a post" like his father. On the edge of a waterfall, van Diemen seemingly shoots Kereama from behind, who tumbles into the pool below. The soldiers hear the shot and rush to the falls, where van Diemen shows them the amputated finger of Kereama with his body under the falls. Having achieved their goal, the company departs, with Carlysle refusing van Diemen's request to bury Kereama.

Back in Auckland, Carlysle sees a man with his head under a spigot, reminding him of the waterfall, and realises that Kereama is still alive. He issues an order to check and arrest any Māori leaving New Zealand with a missing trigger finger. Carlysle tracks down van Diemen, who is leaving for Tasmania without his reward. Carlysle accuses van Diemen of merely knocking Kereama unconscious and amputating Kereama's finger to fake his death, which in flashback appears to be true. Van Diemen denies this and asks Carlysle whether he gave the order to burn his farm. Carlysle says no and van Diemen departs. At a whaling station, Kereama signs onto a ship, revealing that he has all of his fingers, whereas, while being rowed out to the transport ship, van Diemen is shown to be missing his trigger finger.

== Cast ==
The cast consists of British and New Zealand actors.

- Ray Winstone as Arjan Van Diemen
- Temuera Morrison as Kereama
- Gareth Reeves as Major Pritchard Carlysle
- Mark Mitchinson as Sergeant-Major Saunders
- Dan Musgrove as Private Rennick
- Andy Anderson as Bryce
- Mick Rose as Sergeant Leybourne
- Jodie Hillock as Lucy
- Jed Brophy as Corporal Barker

== Production ==
The film was directed by Ian Sharp and written by Nicolas Van Pallandt. It is a co-production of the UK Film Council and New Zealand Film Commission.

It was shot around the Queenstown lakes area of South Island.

== Release ==
Tracker opened in the UK on 22 April 2011. The film went to DVD in June 2011, distributed internationally by Kaleidoscope Entertainment.

== Reception ==
On Rotten Tomatoes the film has an approval rating of 85% based on reviews from 13 critics.

David Edwards of the Daily Mirror gave the film 4/5 and praised the lead performances: "Watching Temuera Morrison and Ray Winstone clash is every bit as electrifying as you'd expect, like a pair of roaring juggernauts colliding at 90mph." Trevor Johnston of Radio Times gave it 3/5 and wrote: "Ultimately, the drama's more satisfying than exciting, but it's a solid entertainment nonetheless." Anna Smith of Empire called it "An intermittently exciting chase adventure with rich period detail." Xan Brooks of The Guardian gave it 2/5 and wrote: "The scenery is glorious, but the movie's a hard slog all the same."

== Awards ==
Tracker made official selection for the Toronto and Valencia film festivals.
