= Protection of Children Act =

Stock short title used for UK legislation

Protection of Children Act is a stock short title used for legislation in the United Kingdom.

== List ==
- The Prevention of Cruelty to, and Protection of, Children Act 1889 (52 & 53 Vict. c. 44)
- The Protection of Children Act 1978 (c. 37)
- The Protection of Children (Tobacco) Act 1986 (c. 34)
- The Protection of Children Act 1999 (c. 14)

=== Scotland ===
- The Protection of Children (Scotland) Act 2003 (asp 5)
- The Protection of Children and Prevention of Sexual Offences (Scotland) Act 2005 (asp 9)

== See also ==
- List of short titles
