= Information held under Section 142 of the Education Act 2002 =

List 99 (also known as the Children’s Barred List and, later, as information held under Section 142 of the Education Act 2002) was a controversial, confidential register of people barred from working with children by the Department for Education and Skills (DfES) In the United Kingdom. The list contained the names, dates of birth, aliases, and national insurance numbers of those people deemed not suitable to work with children in schools, social work and voluntary settings.

== History ==
In 1955, the list that came to be called List 99 was started by the Home Office Consultancy Service.

In 2000, a similar but distinct list was created by the Protection of Children Act 1999.

The Bichard Enquiry (2003) resulted in a report (2004) that noted shortcomings in the use of List 99.

As of 2007, List 99 contained approximately 5,000 names.

In January or October 2009, List 99 and some similar lists were replaced by the Children's Barred List, which was created under the Safeguarding Vulnerable Groups Act 2006 and which was maintained by the Independent Safeguarding Authority (ISA).

The ISA merged with the Criminal Records Bureau in 2012 to form the Disclosure and Barring Service.

== Exclusion ==
Under the Protection of Children Act 1999, people were placed onto List 99 if they had been convicted of, or had received a caution for, an offence against a child.

In the United Kingdom, List 99 was not primarily concerned with child protection, but section 142 allows the Secretary of State for Education to prohibit certain persons from working in schools. Section 143 prohibits a person from arranging to hire any other person who is subject to a direction under section 142 to work in a school.

Adults convicted of serious sexual offences committed against children under the age of 16 since 1995 were automatically placed on List 99. Additional reasons for inclusion were sexual or violent behaviour towards children, abuses of trust, drug offences, any violent crime (for example, conviction of rioting or football hooliganism), stealing school property and deception in job applications. Medical conditions such as drug or alcohol abuse and mental illness were grounds for exclusion.

== See also ==
- Disclosure and Barring Service
- Violent and Sex Offender Register
