= Violent and Sex Offender Register =

Database of sex offenders in the United Kingdom

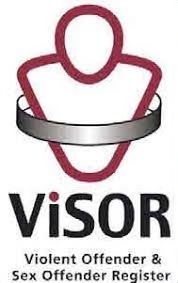
ViSOR Database logo

In the United Kingdom the Violent and Sex Offender Register (ViSOR) is a sex offender registry of those required to register with the police under the Sexual Offences Act 2003 (the 2003 Act), those jailed for more than 12 months for violent offences, and those thought to be at risk of offending.

The Register can be accessed by the police, National Probation Service, and HM Prison Service personnel. Private companies running prisons are also granted access. It used to be managed by the National Policing Improvement Agency of the Home Office, but this was replaced by the National Crime Agency on 7 October 2013, as a feature of the Crime and Courts Act 2013, which also formally abolished the NPIA.

== Notification period ==
Notification periods for offenders sentenced under the 2003 Act are as follows:

- Imprisonment for a fixed period of 30 months or more, or for an indefinite period, or for public protection (abolished in 2012), admission to hospital under restriction order, or subject to an Order for Lifelong Restriction: Indefinite
- Imprisonment for more than 6 months but less than 30 months: 10 years
- Imprisonment for 6 months or less, or admission to hospital without restriction order: 7 years
- Caution: 2 years
- Conditional discharge, or in Scotland a probation order: Period of discharge or probation
- Any other: 5 years

Finite notification periods are halved if the person is under 18 when convicted or cautioned.

In April 2010 the United Kingdom Supreme Court ruled that indefinite notification requirements contained in section 82(1) of the 2003 Act were a breach of individual human rights as they were disproportionate. As a result of this, appeals against indefinite inclusion within the register were introduced. Appeals can be made to the local police force by an offender after inclusion on the register for 15 years. If the local police force declines to remove the offender from the register, they may appeal to a magistrates' court.

== Information held on ViSOR ==
Upon initial registration, offenders must provide the police with the following information:

- Full name
- Home address
- Date of birth
- National Insurance number
- Bank details
- Passport details (if held)

Additionally, when visited by MAPPA officers, they will be invited to, but need not, provide:

- Employer's name and address
- ISP details
- Car registration
- Telephone number(s)

Offenders must inform the police within three days if there are any changes in their name, address, bank details, passport or other ID document.

Offenders must also inform the police at least seven days in advance of any foreign travel (it used to be only if it was for a period of 3 days or more), and they must register any addresses in the UK at which they stay for more than a total of 7 days within any 365-day period. They must provide:

- Date of departure;
- Destination country (or, if there is more than one, the first);
- Point of arrival in each country to which he/she intends to travel;
- Carrier(s) he/she intends to use;
- Return date;
- Point of arrival on return to UK;
- Accommodation arrangements for the first night.

Offenders must confirm their registration annually. That is, if they have not needed to inform the police of any changes above, they must attend a designated police station to register if they have not done so for a year. Failure to comply is an offence, subject to a penalty of five years imprisonment.

On 13 August 2012, the Sexual Offences Act 2003 (Notification Requirements) (England and Wales) Regulations 2012 came into force. Under these regulations, a subject on the Sexual Offenders Register is required to provide the police with details of all bank accounts, credit cards, passport details and any foreign travel regardless of its duration. They are also required to notify the police weekly if they are not registered as regularly residing or staying at one place. They also have to notify the police where they are living in a household with a child under the age of 18.

== Development ==
Construction of the ViSOR application began in January 2003, with a first release of functionality to a pilot site November 2003. The system was subsequently rolled out to a further three pilot sites during early to mid-2004. National (UK) rollout began November 2004, and was completed April 2005.

ViSOR is now in use across all 45 geographic police forces in the UK. Roll out to the Prison and Probation services of England and Wales was scheduled for 2006/07, but was considerably delayed and not completed until the autumn of 2008.

== History ==
In response to a Freedom of Information request in 2009, for example, Greater Manchester Police reported that of 16 people in their area placed on ViSOR since 2007 on their initiative and not as a result of a relevant conviction, four (25%) had clean criminal records.

In April 2021, amendments were proposed to the Domestic Abuse bill to add serial domestic abusers and stalkers to the register, to give family court judges training on dealing with sexual abuse and to provide greater protection for migrant domestic violence victims. Despite the government suggesting support following the killing of Sarah Everard, all but two Conservative MPs voted down these amendments to the bill.

== European Sex Offender Database ==
Prior to the UK leaving the European Union, Members of the European Parliament (MEPs) supported an EU Sex Offender Database. In 2007 an NSPCC report stated that the failure of EU countries to share criminal records properly was in their opinion "leaving children at risk in the UK".

In 2008 the High Court ruled that permanent inclusion on the register was disproportionate and incompatible with the European Convention on Human Rights.

A number of European Union countries such as Spain, Germany and Italy had stated that sex offenders' registration as in the UK was a breach of the European Convention on Human Rights. France has implemented a national judicial sex offender database that has been adjudged to be legal by the European Court of Human Rights in the Gardel v. France decision.

== See also ==
- Sex offender registry
- Information held under Section 142 of the Education Act 2002 ('List 99'), listed people considered unsafe for working with children, since replaced with the Children's Barred List
- HOLMES
- National Identity Register
