= Disclosure and Barring Service =

UK Government body for background checks

Agency overview
- Formed: 1 December 2012
- Preceding agencies: Independent Safeguarding Authority; Criminal Records Bureau
- Agency executive: Jeff James, Chief Executive
- Website: www.gov.uk/dbs

The Disclosure and Barring Service (DBS) is a non-departmental public body of the Home Office of the United Kingdom. The DBS enables organisations in the public, private and voluntary sectors to make safer recruitment decisions by identifying candidates who may be unsuitable for certain work, especially involving children or vulnerable adults, and provides wider access to criminal record information through its disclosure service for England and Wales.

== Legal context ==
It is a legal requirement in the UK for regulated activity employers to notify the DBS if a person leaves or changes their job in relation to having harmed someone. It is an offence for any person who has been barred by the DBS to work or apply to work in Regulated Activity (whether paid or voluntary) with the group (children or adults) from which they are barred. It is also an offence for an employer to knowingly employ a barred person in regulated activity with the group from which they are barred.

An organisation which is entitled to ask exempted questions (under the Rehabilitation of Offenders Act 1974) must register with the DBS, or a registered DBS Umbrella Body before they can request a DBS check on an applicant. The applicant applies to the DBS with their application countersigned by the DBS Registered Organisation or Umbrella Body. The applicant's criminal record is then accessed from the Police National Computer (PNC), as well as checked, if appropriate, against lists of people considered unsuitable to work with children and vulnerable people maintained by the DBS (formerly maintained by the Independent Safeguarding Authority. A copy of the completed certificate is sent to the applicant's home address.

If an individual or organisation has safeguarding concerns regarding a member of staff, they can make a safeguarding referral to the DBS who will work with multiple agencies to assess whether that individual should be Barred from working in regulated activity with children and/or vulnerable groups.

Logo of the Criminal Records Bureau.

The Criminal Records Bureau was established under Part V of the Police Act 1997 and was launched in March 2002, following public concern about the safety of children, young people and vulnerable adults. It was found that the British police forces did not have adequate capability or resources to routinely process and fulfil the large number of criminal record checks requested in a timely fashion, so a dedicated agency was set up to administer this function.

Employers and temporary staff agencies have bemoaned the time it takes for a worker to be cleared by the DBS and in an effort to cut waiting times the government allowed the establishment of "Adult First".

== History ==
In May 2002, the Department for Education began maintaining a list of individuals who are not suitable to work with children. This list was originally named List 99, later named the ISA Children's Barred List (maintained by the Independent Safeguarding Authority) and finally, the DBS Children's Barred List (maintained by the Disclosure and Barring Service).

Under the Care Standards Act (2000), the Department for Health introduced an adult version of List 99 named 'POVA first' on 26 July 2004, this was later renamed 'ISA Adult First' and finally; 'DBS Adult First'. The Adult first and List 99 services allow registered bodies (when eligible) to check whether an applicant appears on the DBS Adults' or Children's Barred List through the online checking system, this takes around two working days to turn around. If the check is clean the organisation may provisionally employ the applicant, subject to an increased level in supervision, until the return by post of the full disclosure.

The DBS was formed in 2012 by merging the functions of the Criminal Records Bureau (CRB) and the Independent Safeguarding Authority (ISA) under the Protection of Freedoms Act 2012. The DBS started operating on 1 December 2012. Its main office is in Liverpool. Its equivalent agencies are Disclosure Scotland in Scotland and Access Northern Ireland in Northern Ireland, although convictions from every part of the UK appear on a DBS check.

On 17 June 2013, a DBS update service was launched, intended to improve the ease of applying for criminal record checks and create significant savings.

On 1 February 2018, the National Audit Office published an investigation report that was highly critical of the DBS.

In 2009, the Home Office launched a programme to increase the efficiency of safeguarding services. Key aims of the programme were to reduce the cost of running the disclosure service, through customers using a new and cheaper update service rather than continuing to use existing types of disclosure certificates. The Home Office expected 2.8 million paying users to be using the new update service by 2017–18, but it was not market tested and the actual number of users is around one million.

According to the National Audit Office investigation, the modernisation programme is now running three and a half years late and expected costs have increased by £229 million. DBS is currently negotiating with its contractor, Tata Consultancy Services, over the delays.

The modernisation programme and the update service were expected to increase the ease and frequency with which people were checked, thereby improving safeguarding. However, the Home Office and DBS do not know how many people have been prevented from working with children or vulnerable adults through use of this information.

== DBS application process ==
The process by which the DBS provides criminal record data is called DBS Certificate or a DBS check (previously CRB check). There are four levels of DBS checks, Basic, Standard, Enhanced and Enhanced with barred list checks (for Basic Disclosures, see Disclosure Scotland). DBS basic checks can be obtained by members of the public. Enhanced checks were historically only available to organisations, but on 21 January 2026 a Statutory Instrument amending Part V of the Police Act 1997 came into force. Since that date, paid self-employed individuals working in regulated activity in England and Wales can apply for an Enhanced DBS check through a registered platform without an employer countersigning the application. Enhanced checks remain restricted to those professions listed in the Exceptions Order (1975) to the Rehabilitation of Offenders Act 1974 as amended by the Protection of Freedoms Act 2012. In January 2018 "Basic" DBS checks were introduced which will disclose details of any cautions or convictions deemed to be unspent in the Rehabilitation of Offenders Act 1974.

=== Basic DBS check ===
The basic DBS check, legally a "criminal conviction certificate" under section 112 of the Police Act 1997, will disclose any convictions or conditional cautions deemed to be unspent according to the Rehabilitation of Offenders Act 1974. The aim is that this service will reduce the need for unnecessary and ineligible Standard or Enhanced checks. Basic DBS checks can be obtained by the individual online through the DBS website or through a registered third party known as a "Responsible Organisation".

=== Standard DBS check ===
The standard DBS check, legally a "criminal record certificate" under sections 113A and 114 of the Police Act 1997, is primarily for positions of high responsibility (for example security guards, locksmiths, and professionals such as accountants and lawyers on entry into the profession). Standard certificates reveal details of any convictions, cautions, reprimands and warnings the applicant has received, that do not qualify for filtering. A standard check may only be applied for if the applicant's job role is specified in the Rehabilitation of Offenders Act 1974 (Exceptions) Order 1975, as amended.

=== Enhanced DBS check ===
An enhanced DBS check, legally an "enhanced criminal record certificate" under sections 113B and 116 of the Police Act 1997, is for positions involving certain activities such as teaching children or treating adults and can also be obtained for certain other professions (for example, judicial appointments, RSPCA officers). An enhanced check may only be applied for if the applicant's job role is specified in both the Rehabilitation of Offenders Act 1974 (Exceptions) order 1975 and the Police Act 1997.

In addition to the information provided on a Standard certificate, the Enhanced certificate involves an additional check with the police, who check if any other information is held on file that may be relevant (for instance, information that has not led to a criminal conviction but may indicate a danger to vulnerable groups). The police decide what (if any) additional information will be added to the certificate using the Quality Assurance Framework.

The involvement of local police forces can mean an enhanced check may take significantly longer than a standard check to be completed.

=== Enhanced with Barred List checks ===
This includes all that Enhanced certificate does, plus a check of the appropriate DBS Barred List. There are two DBS Barred Lists: one for adults, and one for children. The lists contain information on whether the applicant is barred from working with either of the two groups. An individual may only be checked against one or both barred lists if their job role is classified as a "Regulated Activity" with children and/or adults under the Safeguarding Vulnerable Groups Act 2006, as amended.

=== Filtering ===
As of 29 May 2013, the DBS began to "filter" certain criminal information from a DBS certificate if it met the guidelines laid out in the Rehabilitation of Offenders Act 1974 (Exceptions) Order 1975 (Amendment) (England and Wales) Order 2013. The filtering rules have been updated a number of times subsequently, in response to court cases which found that having to disclose very old criminal records, particularly those incurred as a minor, for life was unfair.

=== Update service ===
On 17 June 2013, the DBS update service was launched, intended to improve the ease of applying for criminal record checks and create significant savings. At a fee of £16 a year (or free for volunteers), applicants may use a certificate more than once within a sector where the disclosure level, workforce details, barring list checks and volunteer status are the same; an employer with consent to run a DBS update check and the consent of the subject can, free of charge, check that the existing certificate is up to date, and should check the applicant's identity and the certificate's authenticity.

=== Timeframe and accuracy ===
The DBS work to a number of standards for the criminal record checking service and barring case accuracy.

Performance service standards are also agreed between the DBS and Police disclosure units.

== Reviews ==
The CRB had been due to partner with the ISA in administering the newly created Vetting and Barring Scheme from 2009. This was suspended in 2010 pending a review following the 2010 general election.

This review was published in February 2011, making recommendations for the merger of the Criminal Records Bureau and Independent Safeguarding Authority into one new non-departmental public body, the Disclosure and Barring Service, responsible for barring individuals and completing criminal record checks. Under the Protection of Freedoms Act 2012, the DBS does not require registration, nor are any details retained on a database.

The procedures of the CRB were tightened following the Soham murders trial. Ian Huntley, a former caretaker, was found guilty of murdering two girls from a Cambridgeshire primary school in 2002. Huntley had been suspected of a string of offences including rape, indecent assault and burglary. His only conviction before the murders was for riding an uninsured and unlicensed motorcycle, but a burglary charge had remained on file. In January 2006, following controversies resulting from cases where staff had been hired by schools before a full CRB check had been carried out, the Department for Education and Skills stated: "Employers should obtain a CRB Enhanced Disclosure in respect of all teachers they recruit before the person is placed in a school." Huntley had been hired in November 2001, before the CRB came into force.

Sociologist Frank Furedi has stated that CRB checks cannot provide a "cast-iron guarantee that children will be safe with a particular adult", and that their use has created an atmosphere of suspicion and is "poisoning" relationships between the generations, with many ordinary parents finding themselves regarded as "potential child abusers". The restrictions imposed by the CRB check process have allegedly contributed to a shortage of adult volunteers in organizations such as Girlguiding UK.

- In February 2004, the National Audit Office criticised the CRB for "huge" delays.
- In May 2006, the Home Office revealed that about 2,700 people were mislabelled as criminals during checks.

In 2009 the CRB's Enhanced Disclosure was criticised for including details of any minor contact an individual has had with the police, even where no formal action was taken against them.

== See also ==
- Violent and Sex Offender Register
