= Sue Cook =

British presenter and author (born 1949)

- Born: Susan Lorraine Thomas; 30 March 1949 (age 77); Ruislip, Middlesex, England
- Education: Leicester University
- Occupations: Television presenter; author
- Employer: BBC
- Notable work: On Dangerous Ground (2006); Force of Nature (2009)
- Television: Breakfast Time; Children in Need; Crimewatch; Nationwide; Out of Court
- Spouses: Brian Cook (m. 1971); John Williams; Ian Sharp (m. 2004)
- Children: 2
- Parent(s): William and Kathleen Thomas
- Website: suecook.com

Susan Lorraine Cook (née Thomas; born 30 March 1949) is a British television presenter and author. With Nick Ross, she co-presented the BBC One factual crime show Crimewatch from 1984 until 1995.

== Early life ==
Cook’s mother, Kathleen Thomas, was born in 1919. Her father, William Thomas, born 1917, was a senior executive with the Commission on Industrial Relations (later ACAS). She has two younger brothers and lived in Ickenham.

She attended Glebe Primary School, then the newly opened Vyners Grammar School, also in Ickenham on Warren Road. She gained ten O-levels and three A-levels, and went on to the University of Leicester, graduating in 1971 with an honours degree in psychology and English .

At the age of fifteen in 1964 she became a Queen’s Guide, attached to 2nd Ickenham (St. Giles) Girl Guides

== Career ==
Sue Cook's broadcasting career began as a producer, presenter and DJ for London's Capital Radio. She then moved to the BBC where, over the next thirty years, she presented programmes for both radio and television—notably, You and Yours, Making History, Nationwide, Breakfast Time, We're Going Places, Daytime Live, Children in Need and Out of Court. In 1984, Cook was the joint presenter with Nick Ross on the launch of Crimewatch, staying for eleven years.

Other BBC TV presenting credits include Pebble Mill at One, Omnibus at the Proms, Having a Baby, and many documentary series including Hampton Court Palace, Great Ormond Street Hospital, Maternity Hospital, the 1994 pilot for Out of This World, (the series presented by Carol Vorderman, in 1996), and the Children's Royal Variety Performance. She was a regular guest on Call My Bluff, and a member of Holiday's team of reporters. For Channel 4 she hosted The Chelsea Flower Show, the Hampton Court Flower Show and the popular afternoon series Collectors' Lot. She also appeared as herself in the BBC television drama serial Edge of Darkness (1985) and in The Life and Loves of a She-Devil (1986).

She is a recurring character in the comedy series I'm Alan Partridge, in which she is an unseen friend of Partridge's.

== Publications ==
Cook's two novels, On Dangerous Ground (2006) and Force of Nature (2009), were published by Hodder Headline. She devised and presented a supportive series for writers, The Write Lines, for BBC Oxford.

== Film ==
Cook was the executive producer of Tracker (2010), a film which starred Ray Winstone and was directed by her husband, Ian Sharp, with whom she collaborated on the screenplay. It was released in the UK in April 2011.

She is adapting her first novel, On Dangerous Ground, for the screen.

== Charities ==
Cook is an Ambassador for the King's Trust, and a patron of the British Wireless for the Blind Fund, the Children's Liver Disease Foundation, the Rainbow Trust Children's Charity and Humanists UK.

== Recognition ==
The University of Leicester conferred an honorary D.Litt degree on Cook in 1997 in recognition of her contribution to British broadcasting.

In 2025, Cook was named Britain's number one secret crush by readers of BBC Gardeners' World magazine.
