= Sian Lloyd (news presenter) =

Welsh television news presenter

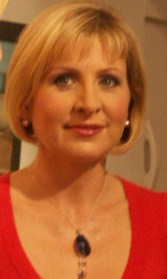
- Born: Sian Wyn Lloyd; 7 August 1968 (age 57); Bangor, Gwynedd, Wales
- Status: Married
- Occupations: Solicitor, newsreader, presenter
- Years active: 1995–present
- Notable credit(s): BBC Wales; BBC Wales Today; BBC News; BBC Breakfast
- Children: one son

Sian Wyn Lloyd (born 7 August 1968) is a Welsh television news presenter, currently working for BBC News as their Wales correspondent.

== Early life ==
Sian Lloyd was born in Bangor, Gwynedd. Her father's family were from Criccieth, where she spent most summers. Lloyd grew up in Wrexham, and speaks Welsh, English and French. She had a weekend job as a teenager at the National Trust's Erddig Hall. She attended Ysgol Bryn Offa, Wrexham, now renamed to Ysgol Clwyedog and Yale Sixth Form college, Wrexham. Lloyd gained an LLB in law at the University of Leicester, before completing her Law Society Finals with Honours at The College of Law Chester.

== Career ==
Lloyd trained as a solicitor with Lovell White Durrant in London and Hong Kong.

Lloyd began her career as a journalist in North Wales as a newsreader for Marcher Coast FM in Colwyn Bay before joining BBC Wales as a reporter 1996, and then having moved to Cardiff went on to present Good Evening Wales for radio, and then BBC Wales Today on television.

Lloyd has taken part in many Welsh language TV programmes on S4C including: cookery challenge Dudley: Pryd o Sêr; comedy chat show Sioe Tudur Owen; magazine programme Heno; and Welsh learners programme Hwb. Lloyd was part of the BBC Wales team of presenters covering the National Eisteddfod of Wales 2011, and has been a judge for the Learner of the Year competition 2012.

Lloyd is currently working for BBC News as their Midlands correspondent. As part of her correspondent role, Lloyd gives regular contributions to BBC's Crimewatch as a reporter. Since the move of various BBC programmes to MediaCityUK in Salford Quays, Manchester in 2012, Lloyd has become a regular relief presenter for BBC Breakfast.

== Personal life ==
Sian lives in Cardiff with her husband and son.

Lloyd supports the Prince's Trust and the Duke of Edinburgh's Award Scheme, and is an ambassador for George Thomas Hospice Care. She has also acted as an ambassador for the Seren Network.
