= Crimewatch File =

British television programme

- Genre: Factual
- Presented by: Nick Ross; Sue Cook; Jill Dando
- Country of origin: United Kingdom
- Original language: English
- No. of episodes: 32

Production
- Production location: Multiple location(s)
- Running time: 45–60 minutes

Original release
- Network: BBC One
- Release: 10 August 1988 – 4 April 2000

Crimewatch File is a British television programme which reconstructed the investigation of a single case that had previously been covered by Crimewatch which viewers had previously helped to solve.

== History ==
Broadcast on BBC One, it was aired on an ad hoc basis and presented by Nick Ross and Sue Cook concurrently (with Jill Dando taking over from Cook in 1996 until her death), more than thirty editions aired until April 2000, when the final edition, fronted by Ross, was broadcast. Following the show's demise, in latter years of the main Crimewatch programme, episodes would regularly feature segments and reports on solved cases previously featured on the programme in a very similar vein to Crimewatch File.

== Transmissions ==
| Entitle | Airdate | Case |
|---|---|---|
| Double Supergrass | 10 August 1988 | One of a gang of London-based armed robbers turns into a double supergrass and makes criminal history |
| The Railway Murders | 17 August 1988 | The murders of Alison Day, Maartje Tamboezer and Anne Lock |
| The Murder of Police Sergeant Speed | 12 October 1988 | The Murder of Police Sergeant John Speed |
| The Shirley Banks Murder | 16 August 1989 | The murder of Shirley Banks |
| Operation Osprey | 23 August 1989 | The UK-wide search by Greater Manchester Police for rapist Andrew Longmire |
| The Red Connection | 15 August 1990 | The 1986 murder of a Lake District hotelier |
| Murder Unearthed | 22 August 1990 | The investigation into a dismembered body found in 1986 in Sussex |
| Operation Trigger | 24 July 1991 | How police forces across the UK cornered one of the UK's most reckless gang of armed robbers |
| A Party to Murder | 5 September 1991 | The murder of Karen Price |
| A Chapter of Revelations | 24 September 1992 | The murder of Ronald Harrison |
| Without Consent | 1 October 1992 | The hunt for a rapist who lured girls into his car by posing as a taxi driver |
| Murder Without Motive | 8 October 1992 | The murder of Dr David Birkett |
| A Murderer's Game | 21 September 1993 | The kidnapping of Stephanie Slater |
| Double Identity | 28 September 1993 | Investigating why a supermarket manager was forced to rob his own store while his family was held hostage |
| Burden of Proof | 1 March 1994 | The murder of Elizabeth McCormack |
| In the Line of Fire | 8 March 1994 | The shooting of David Paterson |
| Sorry, Sarah | 29 March 1994 | Rapist Tony Snow |
| Death of a Gentleman | 6 September 1994 | The murder of Christoph Scliack |
| The Lost Boys (Part 1) | 4 October 1994 | The murder of Jason Swift |
| The Lost Boys (Part 2) | 11 October 1994 | The follow-up investigation Operation Orchid which established links between Jason's murder and the murders of other young boys in the 1980s |
| Armed and Dangerous | 28 February 1995 | The capture of armed robbers which involved seven police forces, Interpol and the Spanish judicial authorities |
| Scarred | 10 October 1995 | The rape of a young woman in south west London |
| Going Under | 7 November 1995 | The murders of Fred Maltby and Alan “Joe” Rylatt |
| The Iceman | 17 September 1996 | The murder of Harry and Nicola Fuller |
| Daniel Handley — A Stolen Life | 12 November 1996 | The murder of Daniel Handley |
| Crimewatch File: Manhunt | 11 March 1998 | The murder of a garage owner and his assistant in Morecambe |
| Dreams of Gold | 18 March 1998 | The investigation into Olympic swimming coach Paul Hickson |
| Left for Dead | 26 May 1998 | The brutal attack on Merlyn Nuttall |
| Murder Without Motive | 13 October 1998 | The murder of Margaret Wilson |
| Sorrow | 27 October 1998 | The murder of Glenda Hoskins |
| Wanted | 28 April 1999 | How police caught conman Leslie Salter |
| The Hunter and the Hunted: DJ Rapist | 4 April 2000 | The hunt for rapist Richard Baker |

== See also ==
- Crimewatch
