= Steinbauer =

Steinbauer is a German surname. Notable people with the surname include:

- Anja Steinbauer (born 1966) Sinologist and philosopher
- Ben Steinbauer (born 1977), American documentary film director
- Jodi Appelbaum-Steinbauer (born 1956), American professional tennis player
- Rudolf Steinbauer (born 1959), Austrian football player and manager
- Walter Steinbauer (1945–1991), West German bobsledder
