= Louise Minchin =

British journalist and news presenter

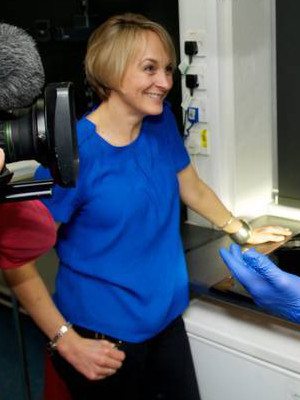
- Minchin in 2012
- Born: Louise Mary Grayson; 8 September 1968 (age 57); British Hong Kong
- Education: University of St Andrews
- Occupations: Journalist presenter Anchor
- Notable credit(s): BBC Breakfast; BBC News at One; Missing Live; The One Show; Real Rescues; Lorraine
- Spouse: David Minchin (m. 1998)
- Children: 2
- Website: Official website

Louise Mary Minchin (née Grayson; born 8 September 1968) is a British television presenter, journalist and former news presenter who currently works freelance within the BBC.

Beginning in 2012, Minchin was a regular anchor on the BBC One programme Breakfast, co-hosting the show three days a week, originally with Bill Turnbull and Charlie Stayt and then with Dan Walker from 2016. On 8 June 2021, Minchin announced live on air that she would be leaving BBC Breakfast "after the summer", having presented the show for 20 years (at first as a stand-in host). Her final appearance on the show was on 15 September 2021.

From 2009 until 2012, Minchin co-hosted Real Rescues alongside Nick Knowles and Chris Hollins. In January 2025, Minchin began co-presenting Rip Off Britain.

== Early life ==
The eldest of three children, Minchin was born Louise Mary Grayson in 1968 in British Hong Kong, where her father was a Major in the Irish Guards of the British Army. She grew up in Berkshire, and was educated at St Mary's School, Ascot, and has a degree in Spanish from the University of St Andrews. She subsequently studied journalism at the London College of Communication.

== Career ==
Minchin started her career in the Latin American section of the BBC World Service during a year in Argentina, the Today programme, Five and various local radio stations. In 2006, she toured the country in a converted bus meeting England fans as part of the World Cup coverage for BBC News.

She started work for Radio 5 Live in 1998, and married David Minchin the same year. She presented many of the station's main programmes, including Drive and Breakfast. Between September 2003 and April 2012, she was a regular BBC News Channel presenter, initially working alongside Jon Sopel from 7 pm to 10 pm. Minchin then presented the 2 pm to 5 pm slot, also with Sopel, sharing this shift with Emily Maitlis. She was also one of the main relief presenters for BBC News at One until April 2012.

Minchin first appeared on BBC Breakfast as a stand-in presenter on 24 December 2001. In 2006 and 2007, Minchin was a relief presenter on BBC Breakfast while Kate Silverton covered for main anchor Sian Williams. After Williams returned, she continued to co-host the programme, and from May 2009 until April 2012 was the regular weekend presenter of the show. In December 2011, the BBC announced that Minchin would replace Williams as a main presenter of BBC Breakfast along with Bill Turnbull and Charlie Stayt when the programme moved to Salford—the first edition was presented on Tuesday 10 April 2012. On Tuesday 8 June 2021, she announced live on BBC Breakfast that she would be stepping down from the role later that year to concentrate on other interests. Her final appearance on the show was on 15 September 2021.

From 21 April 2008, Minchin presented a weekday programme called Missing Live along with Rav Wilding. The programme was shown at 9:15 am after BBC Breakfast on BBC One and ran for four weeks. The show returned for a second four-week run from 16 March 2009, and again in March 2010, highlighting both new cases and those previously featured with updates.

Minchin and Colin Jackson presented the Sunday morning show Sunday Life on BBC One in 2008.

From 2 November 2009, Minchin presented four weeks of live broadcasts of Real Rescues along with Nick Knowles.

Minchin also presented In the Know, a BBC sports magazine programme on Saturday mornings on BBC One during the 2004 Athens Olympics alongside co-presenter John Inverdale.

In April 2010, Minchin co-presented The One Show for a week alongside Chris Hollins while regular hosts Adrian Chiles and Christine Bleakley were unavailable. Minchin covered again when the show returned in July 2010 for two weeks alongside Matt Baker and one episode with Matt Allwright.

Minchin and Gethin Jones presented the documentary series Crime and Punishment, which began on BBC One on 12 March 2012.

For a time from November 2012, Minchin was a co-presenter of Radio 5 Live's Drive programme with Peter Allen. She has worked as an occasional presenter of BBC Radio 4's daily consumer programme You and Yours.

Minchin has played herself reading the news in three BBC series: spy drama Spooks, crime drama Silent Witness and the Torchwood mini-series Children of Earth.

In 2016, Minchin competed in Celebrity MasterChef on BBC One, finishing second.

In June 2021, BBC announced that Minchin was to leave BBC Breakfast after almost 20 years of working on the show.

In November 2021, Minchin was announced as a contestant on the twenty-first series of I'm a Celebrity...Get Me Out of Here!. She finished in seventh place.

In January 2025, Minchin began co-presenting Rip Off Britain; replacing Angela Rippon.

== Awards ==
In March 2014, she was awarded an Honorary Doctor of Letters degree by the University of Chester.

== Personal life ==
Louise married David Minchin on 6 June 1998 in Hampshire. The couple have two daughters. Minchin and her husband previously lived in South London but relocated to Chester, Cheshire, in 2012, following the move of BBC Breakfast to Salford.

She is an amateur triathlete, and qualified as a member of the 2015 Great Britain Age-Group Triathlon Team (45–49 age group). She competed in the standard distance event (1500 m swim, a 40 km bike ride and a 10 km run) at the World Triathlon Championships in Chicago on 19 September 2015. She qualified for the team at the Dambuster Triathlon at Rutland Water on 15 June 2015. She went on to finish 71st out of 78 finishers at the ITU World Triathlon Championships.

In August 2019, Minchin discussed her experiences with menopause, describing her experience of suffering hot flushes on the BBC Breakfast set that led to the temperature in the studio being lowered.

A man who stalked both Minchin and one of her daughters pleaded guilty in October 2021 to sending intimidating messages via Instagram. The crimes occurred in July 2020 during the term of a suspended sentence for stalking Girls Aloud singer Nicola Roberts. The man had sent a series of messages to Minchin and her daughter threatening extreme violence. In December 2021, the 44-year-old man from Flintshire was sentenced at Mold Crown Court to two years and eight months in jail, with the judge stating that his victims were still suffering "deep distress".

=== Charity ===
Minchin has also taken part in "Around the World in 80 days" for Children in Need.

== Books ==
- Dare to Tri: My Journey from the BBC Breakfast Sofa to GB Team Triathlete (Bloomsbury, 2019) ISBN 978-1472961846
- Fearless: Adventures with Extraordinary Women (Bloomsbury, 2023) ISBN 978-1399401180

== See also ==
- List of I'm a Celebrity...Get Me Out of Here! (British TV series) contestants

Media offices
Preceded by Darren Jordon	Deputy Presenter of BBC News at One; 2006–2009	Succeeded by Kate Silverton
Preceded by Susanna Reid	Deputy Female Presenter of BBC Breakfast; 2012–2014	Succeeded by Naga Munchetty
Preceded by Susanna Reid	Main Female Presenter of BBC Breakfast; 2014–2021	Succeeded by Sally Nugent
