= The Heaven and Earth Show =

- Genre: Religion/Spirituality
- Directed by: Studio: Patty Marr/Matt Woodward
- Presented by: Various, including: Gloria Hunniford; Alice Beer; Amanda Redington; Ross Kelly; Juliet Morris; Esther McVey; Philippa Forrester; Phil Hammond; Yvette Fielding
- Theme music composer: Dave Cooke (original theme)/Steve Millington
- Country of origin: United Kingdom
- Original language: English

Production
- Executive producer: Chris Loughlin
- Production locations: BBC Manchester, then Granada Studios, Manchester
- Running time: 60 min. per episode

Original release
- Network: BBC One
- Release: 6 September 1998 – 2 September 2007

The Heaven and Earth Show is a BBC television programme that aired on Sunday mornings from 10 am to 11 am on BBC One. The show ran for nine years between 1998 and 2007, looking at spiritual and moral issues. Over the years it had numerous presenters, and its final presenter was Gloria Hunniford.

== Format ==
The programme had a magazine format, with guests of all backgrounds talking about various ethical, spiritual and cultural issues. The programme also featured phone-ins, email and text readouts. Commonly a celebrity guest would be interviewed about their career with a particular focus on religious belief or spirituality; some later guests included Jermaine Jackson, Al Green, Alexei Sayle and Vic Reeves. The Heaven and Earth Show was notably different from traditional "God slot" (Sunday morning/afternoon) programming in that it concentrated on a wide range of beliefs rather than just Christianity – for example, features on the ethics of halal meat or "New Age" concepts of spirituality. It included prominent figures from the Church and Islamic, Jewish, Hindu and secular communities and would also contain reports on topical religious issues, with notable reporters including Toyah Willcox, John Walters, Ed Stourton, Myleene Klass, Kate Silverton and Kate Gerbeau.

Occasionally there were special programmes such as that on 7 September 2003 covering three different types of beliefs: theist, New Age followers and atheists or agnostics. A specially commissioned poll was produced on issues raised.

== Productions ==
The Heaven and Earth Show was made by the BBC's in-house Religion and Ethics department, and was broadcast live from a former news studio at the BBC in Oxford Road, Manchester. Later, as part of a re-launch, the show moved to ITV's Granada Studios.

== Cancellation ==
The BBC announced in the spring of 2007 that they would be cancelling the show in autumn after a run of nine years and replacing it for a 12-month period with commissions made by two independent production companies. On 2 September 2007, The Heaven and Earth Show had its final edition; The Proclaimers and Beth Neilsen Chapman were the final musical guests.

== Notable guests ==
Over the years many guests appeared on the programme, including:

- Tom Baker – British actor
- Michael Ball – British musician
- John Barrowman – British actor
- Pierce Brosnan – Irish actor
- Ed Byrne – Irish comedian
- Ray Charles – American musician
- Kevin Costner – American actor
- Noel Edmonds – British TV presenter
- Vanessa Feltz – British TV and radio presenter
- Morgan Freeman – American actor
- Dennis Hopper – American actor
- Jim Jefferies – Australian comedian
- Matthew Kelly – British TV presenter
- Myleene Klass – British musician and TV presenter
- John Lydon – British musician
- Liza Minnelli – American actress
- Gary Numan – British musician
- Mike Oldfield – British musician
- Henry Olonga – Zimbabwean cricketer
- Nerina Pallot – British musician
- Dolly Parton – American musician
- Vic Reeves – British comedian
- Cliff Richard – British musician
- Lionel Richie – American musician
- Tony Robinson – British actor and TV presenter
- William Shatner – Canadian actor
- Joan Sims – British actress (in one of her final interviews)
- Anja Steinbauer – German philosopher
- Barry White – American musician

== See also ==
- Sunday Life, replacement TV show
