= Sunday Life =

Sunday Life may refer to:

- Sunday Life (newspaper), a Sunday newspaper based in Belfast, Northern Ireland
- Sunday Life (supplement), a supplement to the Australian newspaper The Sydney Morning Herald
- Sunday Life (TV series), a BBC television programme
