= Missing Live =

BBC series about missing persons cases

- Also known as: Missing (2005–2007); Missing 2011
- Genre: Factual
- Presented by: Sally Magnusson (2005–2007); Rav Wilding (2008–2010); Louise Minchin (2008–2011)
- Country of origin: United Kingdom
- Original language: English
- No. of series: 8

Production
- Running time: 45 minutes

Original release
- Network: BBC One
- Release: 31 January 2005 – 13 May 2011

Related
- Missing (2009)

Missing, titled Missing Live from 2008 to 2010, is a BBC One morning television series which was broadcast between 2005 and 2011. Sally Magnusson was the programme's original presenter. She was replaced by Louise Minchin and Rav Wilding from the fifth series, which adopted a live studio style as opposed to the pre-recorded, docudrama, style of the previous series. The seventh series returned to the original style with Louise Minchin becoming the sole presenter of the programme.

== Format and broadcasts ==
The programme follows the work of the police and the charity Missing People, as they search for some of the 210,000 people who are reported missing every year.

=== Series One (2005) ===
This series was presented by Sally Magnusson and was split into two parts. The first part ran from 31 January 2005 to 4 February 2005. The second part ran from 9 May 2005 to 13 May 2005 as part of Missing Persons Month. The first series featured the charity Missing People and Lambeth Police Missing Persons Unit.

=== Series Two (2005) ===
Series two ran from 12 to 23 December 2005 and aired from 9:15 to 10:00am. The second series continued to feature the charity Missing People and Lambeth police, but also featured Hackney Police Missing Persons Unit.

=== Series Three (2006) ===
Series three ran from 24 April to 5 May 2006 and aired from 9:15 to 10:00am. Series Three featured the cases of Robbie Carroll and Anne Simpson both of whom are still missing.

Tom Moore, who has been missing since 15 July 2003, was also featured. Tom is still missing.

=== Series Four (2007) ===
Series four ran from 16 to 27 April 2007 and aired from 9:15 to 10:00am. Series Four featured the case of Barry Coughlan who was missing from Crosshaven in County Cork from 1 May 2004 until his remains were discovered in May 2021.

=== Series Five (2008) ===
Series five ran from 21 April to 16 May 2008 and aired from 9:15 to 10:00am with new presenters Louise Minchin and Rav Wilding. This series use filmed reconstructions of individual missing persons cases, live studio interviews with the friends and family of missing people and on-air appeals for more than 100 people. The programmes also investigated the reasons why people go missing and looked at the technology and techniques used to help find those who have disappeared, including age progression techniques. Guests on series five included Bob Geldof, Gerry and Kate McCann (parents of missing Madeleine McCann) and Lynda Bellingham.

As a result of appeals made during the programme, the BBC and Missing People's confidential helpline received hundreds of calls and potential sightings and a total of 17 people featured on the show were found.

=== Series Six (2009) ===
Series six began on 16 March 2009, and concluded on 10 April. The drama Missing was commissioned and broadcast alongside Missing Live, starring Pauline Quirke as the head of a busy, under-resourced missing persons unit in South East England.

=== Series Seven (2010) ===
Series seven began aired from 15 to 26 March 2010. It was again hosted by Rav Wilding and Louise Minchin and the series ran in conjunction with the Missing drama series as in 2009.

=== Series Eight (2011) ===
Series eight aired from 9 to 13 May 2011. It was based in a new studio and renamed Missing 2011 because it was now pre-recorded. It was presented solely by Louise Minchin and had guest reporters including Fiona Phillips. The show was focused on appeals and interviews for solved cases.
