= Dunbar Town House =

Municipal Building in Dunbar, Scotland

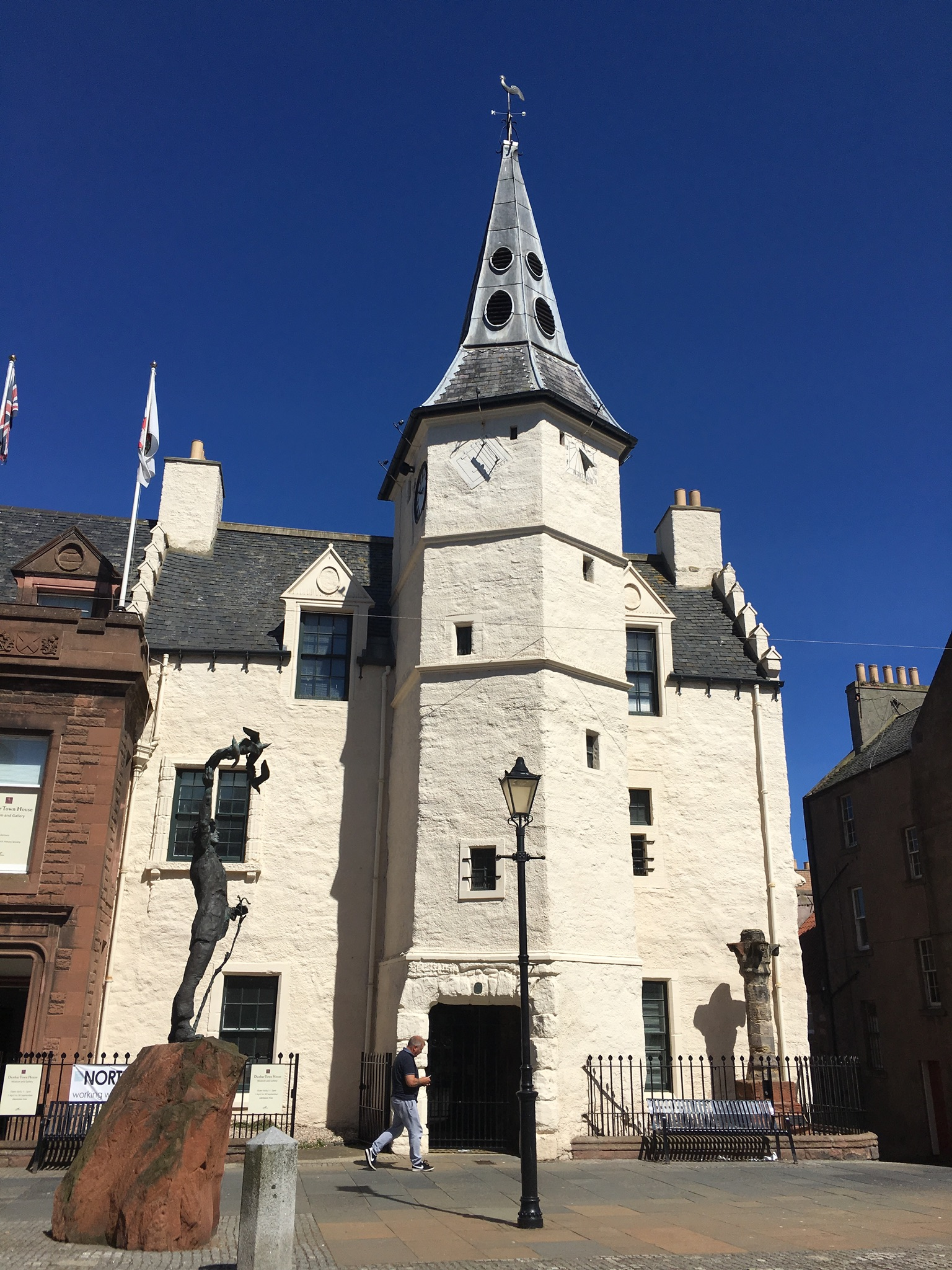
- Dunbar Town House

- Shown in East Lothian
- 56.0022°N 2.5157°W
- Location: High Street, Dunbar

History
- Built: 1593

Site notes
- Architectural style: Renaissance style

Listed Building – Category A
- Official name: High Street, Town House
- Designated: 5 February 1971
- Reference no.: LB24790

The Dunbar Town House, also known as Dunbar Tolbooth, is a municipal structure in the High Street in Dunbar, East Lothian, Scotland. The building, which currently operates as a museum, is a Category A listed building.

== History ==
The first municipal building in Dunbar was a tolbooth which dated back at least to the first half of the 16th century. After it became dilapidated, it was rebuilt in the Renaissance style with harled rubble masonry from a quarry at Innerwick to create the current structure which was completed in 1593. The design involved an asymmetrical main frontage with three bays facing onto the High Street; the central bay featured a semi-octagonal tower which projected forward. The tower featured a pend with a wrought iron grill on the ground floor, small windows on the upper floors and a spire. The outer bays were fenestrated on the first floor by two sash windows on the left and two small windows on the right, while, on the second floor there were two pedimented dormer windows. There were stepped gables at each end of the building. Internally, the principal rooms were the two prison cells with vaulted ceilings on the first floor, one of which was for debtors and the other for petty criminals, while the second floor accommodated a council chamber. The rooms on the upper floors were accessed by a spiral staircase inside the tower.

In the 17th and early 18th centuries, the council chamber, which was also used as a courthouse, was the venue for the trials and convictions of some 73 women accused of witchcraft, for which the penalty was execution by strangulation and burning. The royal coat of arms of King James VII of Scotland was installed above the fireplace in the council chamber in 1686 and was later supplemented by a royal coat of arms of the Hanovarian era. A pair of sundials were also inset into the face of the tower in the late 17th century.

Lean-to extensions to the outer bays, which had been probably been added in the 19th century, were removed in 1912 and the mercat cross, which took the form of an octagonal shaft surmounted by a cross, was relocated to the front of the town house around the same time. After significant population growth, largely associated with the status of the town as a seaport, the town was advanced to the status of small burgh, with the town house as its meeting place, in 1930. The Queen, accompanied by Duke of Edinburgh, visited the council chamber, which was re-carpeted for the occasion, during a tour of East Lothian in July 1956.

The building continued to serve as the headquarters of the burgh council for much of the 20th century, but ceased to be the local seat of government after the enlarged East Lothian Council was formed in 1975. It subsequently became the home of the local registrar's office as well as the venue for meetings of Dunbar Community Council.

A local history museum was established in the building in 1994, and a statue, designed by the Ukrainian sculptor, Valentin Ivanovich Znoba, of the Scottish-American, John Muir, who founded National Parks in the US, was unveiled outside the town house by the television presenter, Magnus Magnusson, in October 1997. An extensive programme of refurbishment works, financed by the Heritage Lottery Fund, Historic Scotland, and several corporate donors, was completed in January 2012. The works, which cost £1.5 million, included the re-harling of the façade of the building.

== See also ==
- List of listed buildings in Dunbar, East Lothian
- List of Category A listed buildings in East Lothian
