= List of listed buildings in Dunbar, East Lothian =

This is a list of listed buildings in the parish of Dunbar in East Lothian, Scotland.

== List ==
| Name | Location | Date Listed | Grid Ref. (Note: Sometimes known as OSGB36, the grid reference (where provided) is based on the British national grid reference system used by the Ordnance Survey. • "Guide to National Grid". Ordnance Survey. • "Get-a-map". Ordnance Survey.) | Geo-coordinates | Notes | LB Number (Note: Historic Environment Scotland assign a unique alphanumeric identifier to each designated site in Scotland, for listed buildings this always begins with "LB", for example "LB12345".) | Image |
|---|---|---|---|---|---|---|---|
| Queen's Road, 6-11 (Inclusive Nos) Bowmont Terrace | | | | 55°59′54″N 2°30′30″W | Category B | 24847 | Upload Photo |
| Roxburghe Terrace, Kirkhill House | | | | 55°59′51″N 2°30′14″W | Category B | 24849 | Upload Photo |
| Station Road, Dunbar Railway Station And Station Lodge | | | | 55°59′54″N 2°30′47″W | Category B | 24857 | Upload Photo |
| 2-9 (Inclusive Nos) Victoria Street | | | | 56°00′14″N 2°30′59″W | Category B | 24860 | Upload Photo |
| 1 Delisle Street | | | | 56°00′08″N 2°31′04″W | Category C(S) | 24758 | Upload Photo |
| East Links Road, St Ronans With Garden Walls And Gateway | | | | 56°00′01″N 2°30′41″W | Category B | 24765 | Upload Photo |
| 23 High Street, Bamburgh Castle (Through Close Of 21-25 High Street) | | | | 56°00′03″N 2°30′51″W | Category B | 24774 | Upload Photo |
| 27 And 29 High Street (Formerly Known As 1 And 2 Templelands) | | | | 56°00′03″N 2°30′52″W | Category B | 24775 | Upload Photo |
| 73 And 75 High Street (Eagle Inn) | | | | 56°00′07″N 2°30′56″W | Category B | 24787 | Upload Photo |
| High Street, Courtyard Through 71-75 High Street | | | | 56°00′07″N 2°30′55″W | Category A | 24788 | Upload Photo |
| 97 And 99 High Street | | | | 56°00′09″N 2°30′57″W | Category B | 24792 | Upload Photo |
| 165 High Street And 1 Victoria Street, Castle Hotel | | | | 56°00′13″N 2°31′00″W | Category C(S) | 24796 | Upload Photo |
| 40 High Street | | | | 56°00′05″N 2°30′56″W | Category B | 24803 | Upload Photo |
| High Street (Close Through 90 High Street) | | | | 56°00′08″N 2°30′59″W | Category B | 24816 | Upload Photo |
| High Street Close Of 106 | | | | 56°00′09″N 2°31′01″W | Category B | 24820 | Upload Photo |
| 110 And 112 High Street | | | | 56°00′10″N 2°31′03″W | Category B | 24822 | Upload Photo |
| 136 And 138 High Street | | | | 56°00′11″N 2°31′02″W | Category C(S) | 24826 | Upload Photo |
| High Street, Lauderdale House | | | | 56°00′13″N 2°31′03″W | Category A | 24829 | Upload another image |
| 21 And 23 Lamer Street | | | | 56°00′16″N 2°30′52″W | Category C(S) | 24833 | Upload Photo |
| 25 Lamer Street, Jersey Arms | | | | 56°00′16″N 2°30′52″W | Category C(S) | 24834 | Upload Photo |
| 10 And 12 Lamer Street | | | | 56°00′11″N 2°30′50″W | Category C(S) | 24836 | Upload Photo |
| Belhaven Belhaven Hill Boys School, Stables, Lodge Walled Garden And Gate Piers | | | | 56°00′06″N 2°32′09″W | Category B | 24733 | Upload Photo |
| Belhaven, 5 Duke Street | | | | 55°59′56″N 2°32′23″W | Category B | 24736 | Upload Photo |
| Belhaven, 7 And 9 Duke Street, Outbuilding, Walls And Piers | | | | 55°59′56″N 2°32′25″W | Category B | 24737 | Upload Photo |
| Belhaven, 22 Duke Street, Charnwood | | | | 55°59′54″N 2°32′29″W | Category B | 24739 | Upload Photo |
| Belhaven, Edinburgh Road, Seafield Crescent | | | | 55°59′53″N 2°32′28″W | Category B | 24740 | Upload Photo |
| Barns Ness Lighthouse With Keepers' Cottages And Retaining Walls | | | | 55°59′13″N 2°26′44″W | Category B | 1465 | Upload Photo |
| Broxmouth Park, Observatory (Also Known As Sloe Bigging Lookout Tower) | | | | 55°59′35″N 2°28′56″W | Category C(S) | 1472 | Upload Photo |
| Oxwellmains Windmill | | | | 55°58′44″N 2°28′45″W | Category B | 1475 | Upload Photo |
| 1-8 (Inclusive Nos) Eweford Farm Cottages | | | | 55°59′21″N 2°32′15″W | Category C(S) | 1506 | Upload Photo |
| Hedderwick Hill Stables With Dairy Pavilion | | | | 55°59′43″N 2°34′49″W | Category B | 1510 | Upload Photo |
| 3-9 (Odd Nos) Victoria Place | | | | 56°00′18″N 2°30′53″W | Category B | 51777 | Upload Photo |
| 19A,19B, 19C Victoria Street, 10 And 12 Writer's Court Including Boundary Walls | | | | 56°00′16″N 2°30′53″W | Category B | 51779 | Upload Photo |
| Roxburghe Terrace, Newhouse Farm Steading And Horsemill | | | | 55°59′51″N 2°30′21″W | Category B | 24850 | Upload Photo |
| Victoria Street, Volunteer Arms | | | | 56°00′16″N 2°30′53″W | Category C(S) | 24861 | Upload Photo |
| 12-30 (Even Nos) Victoria Street | | | | 56°00′17″N 2°30′53″W | Category B | 24862 | Upload Photo |
| 9 West Port | | | | 56°00′08″N 2°31′02″W | Category B | 24865 | Upload Photo |
| 13 West Port | | | | 56°00′08″N 2°31′03″W | Category B | 24866 | Upload Photo |
| 15 Church Street, Beach House | | | | 56°00′08″N 2°30′51″W | Category B | 24753 | Upload Photo |
| Church Street, Old Assembly Rooms | | | | 56°00′07″N 2°30′50″W | Category B | 24754 | Upload Photo |
| Delisle Street, Friar's Croft Dovecot | | | | 56°00′05″N 2°31′05″W | Category A | 24764 | Upload another image |
| East Links Road, St Ninians, Inchgarth And Retaining Wall | | | | 56°00′00″N 2°30′40″W | Category B | 24766 | Upload Photo |
| 7 High Street, Port Lodge | | | | 56°00′02″N 2°30′48″W | Category B | 24770 | Upload Photo |
| 31-35 (Odd Nos) High Street | | | | 56°00′04″N 2°30′53″W | Category B | 24776 | Upload Photo |
| 55 And 59 High Street | | | | 56°00′05″N 2°30′54″W | Category B | 24782 | Upload Photo |
| 61 And 63 High Street | | | | 56°00′06″N 2°30′55″W | Category B | 24783 | Upload Photo |
| 105 High Street | | | | 56°00′10″N 2°30′58″W | Category C(S) | 24793 | Upload Photo |
| 56-60 (Even Nos) High Street | | | | 56°00′06″N 2°30′58″W | Category A | 24806 | Upload Photo |
| 58 High Street Monkswalk And G W Day's House (Through Close Of No 56-60) High Street | | | | 56°00′06″N 2°30′59″W | Category C(S) | 24807 | Upload Photo |
| 62-66 (Even Nos) High Street | | | | 56°00′06″N 2°30′58″W | Category B | 24808 | Upload Photo |
| High Street Close Of 102 | | | | 56°00′09″N 2°31′00″W | Category B | 24818 | Upload Photo |
| 104 High Street | | | | 56°00′09″N 2°31′00″W | Category B | 24819 | Upload Photo |
| 114 And 116 High Street | | | | 56°00′10″N 2°31′00″W | Category B | 24824 | Upload Photo |
| Lawson Place, Baker's Croft (Formerly St Anne's Rectory) | | | | 56°00′11″N 2°31′07″W | Category B | 24837 | Upload Photo |
| Old Harbour, Spott's Granary | | | | 56°00′18″N 2°30′46″W | Category B | 24840 | Upload Photo |
| Belhaven, 11 High Street | | | | 55°59′56″N 2°32′16″W | Category C(S) | 24745 | Upload Photo |
| Belhaven, 7 North Street | | | | 55°59′56″N 2°32′31″W | Category B | 24748 | Upload Photo |
| Belton Lodge With Gatepiers And Quadrant Walls | | | | 55°58′56″N 2°34′02″W | Category B | 1468 | Upload Photo |
| Broxburn, Thistle Inn | | | | 55°59′14″N 2°29′32″W | Category B | 1469 | Upload Photo |
| Broxmouth Park (Broxmouth House) With Boundary Walls, Gatepiers And Bridge | | | | 55°59′25″N 2°29′19″W | Category B | 1470 | Upload Photo |
| East Barns Cartshed And Granary, Power House And Stalk | | | | 55°58′41″N 2°27′17″W | Category B | 1504 | Upload Photo |
| Hallhill Farmhouse | | | | 55°59′33″N 2°31′23″W | Category B | 1508 | Upload Photo |
| Hedderwick Farmhouse | | | | 55°59′14″N 2°35′21″W | Category B | 1509 | Upload Photo |
| North Belton Farmhouse | | | | 55°59′11″N 2°34′49″W | Category C(S) | 1518 | Upload Photo |
| 101, 103 High Street | | | | 56°00′09″N 2°30′58″W | Category C(S) | 51160 | Upload Photo |
| 1-4 (Consecutive Nos) Buncles Court, 30-38 (Even Nos) Lamer Street | | | | 56°00′15″N 2°30′52″W | Category B | 51775 | Upload Photo |
| 1 And 3 Shore Street, Also Known As Old Harbour | | | | 56°00′14″N 2°30′49″W | Category B | 24851 | Upload Photo |
| 21 West Port | | | | 56°00′08″N 2°31′03″W | Category B | 24867 | Upload Photo |
| 3 Delisle Street, Croft House | | | | 56°00′08″N 2°31′06″W | Category B | 24759 | Upload Photo |
| Golf House Road, Beachcote | | | | 55°59′54″N 2°30′21″W | Category C(S) | 24769 | Upload Photo |
| 137 And 139 High Street | | | | 56°00′12″N 2°30′58″W | Category B | 24795 | Upload Photo |
| 50-54 (Even Numbers) High Street | | | | 56°00′06″N 2°30′58″W | Category C(S) | 24805 | Upload Photo |
| 76 High Street | | | | 56°00′07″N 2°30′58″W | Category B | 24812 | Upload Photo |
| 80-84 (Even Nos) High Street | | | | 56°00′07″N 2°30′59″W | Category B | 24813 | Upload Photo |
| 86 And 88 High Street | | | | 56°00′08″N 2°30′59″W | Category C(S) | 24814 | Upload Photo |
| 90 And 92 High Street | | | | 56°00′08″N 2°30′59″W | Category B | 24815 | Upload Photo |
| 126 And 128 High Street | | | | 56°00′10″N 2°31′01″W | Category B | 24825 | Upload Photo |
| Queen's Road, 3-5 (Inclusive Nos) Bowmont Terrace | | | | 55°59′53″N 2°30′27″W | Category B | 24846 | Upload Photo |
| Bayswell Park Drinking Fountain | | | | 56°00′17″N 2°31′28″W | Category C(S) | 24728 | Upload Photo |
| Belhaven, Edinburgh Road Summerfield And Lodge | | | | 55°59′58″N 2°32′07″W | Category C(S) | 24742 | Upload Photo |
| Belhaven, 2 North Street | | | | 55°59′56″N 2°32′30″W | Category C(S) | 24750 | Upload Photo |
| Broxmouth Stable Court And Gatepiers | | | | 55°59′28″N 2°29′15″W | Category B | 1473 | Upload Photo |
| West Barns, Bielside South Lodge With Gatepiers And Quadrants | | | | 55°59′42″N 2°33′21″W | Category C(S) | 1479 | Upload Photo |
| West Barns Inn | | | | 55°59′42″N 2°33′18″W | Category B | 1481 | Upload Photo |
| Hallhill Cottages | | | | 55°59′41″N 2°31′23″W | Category C(S) | 1507 | Upload Photo |
| Hedderwick Hill Walled Garden | | | | 55°59′34″N 2°34′56″W | Category C(S) | 1511 | Upload Photo |
| Lochend Gatepiers And Boundary Walls | | | | 55°59′40″N 2°31′22″W | Category C(S) | 1513 | Upload Photo |
| Ninewar With Walled Garden, Gardener's Cottage And Gatepiers | | | | 55°59′14″N 2°36′14″W | Category B | 1516 | Upload Photo |
| 7 Shore Street, Also Known As Old Harbour | | | | 56°00′13″N 2°30′48″W | Category B | 24853 | Upload Photo |
| 3 Silver Street | | | | 56°00′07″N 2°30′55″W | Category B | 24856 | Upload Photo |
| Belhaven Road, Eden Hotel | | | | 56°00′04″N 2°31′19″W | Category B | 24751 | Upload Photo |
| 2 Colvin Street, Foresters Arms | | | | 56°00′09″N 2°30′52″W | Category C(S) | 24755 | Upload Photo |
| Off Countess Road, The Retreat With Stables And Walled Garden | | | | 55°59′49″N 2°31′04″W | Category B | 24757 | Upload Photo |
| East Links Road, St Julians (Formerly 1-3 Clyde Villas) | | | | 55°59′59″N 2°30′37″W | Category C(S) | 24768 | Upload Photo |
| 41 High Street | | | | 56°00′04″N 2°30′54″W | Category B | 24777 | Upload Photo |
| 41C High Street (Through Close) | | | | 56°00′05″N 2°30′53″W | Category B | 24778 | Upload Photo |
| 77 High Street | | | | 56°00′07″N 2°30′56″W | Category B | 24789 | Upload Photo |
| 133 And 135 High Street | | | | 56°00′11″N 2°30′59″W | Category C(S) | 24794 | Upload Photo |
| High Street, Abbey Church, Retaining Walls And Lamp Standards | | | | 56°00′01″N 2°30′52″W | Category B | 24797 | Upload Photo |
| Knockenhair Road, Knockenhair House, Old Windmill, Lodge And Gatepiers | | | | 56°00′08″N 2°31′51″W | Category B | 24830 | Upload Photo |
| Old Harbour Fishermen's Monument | | | | 56°00′15″N 2°30′46″W | Category B | 24841 | Upload Photo |
| Queen's Road Parish Church And Graveyard, Church Of Scotland | | | | 55°59′57″N 2°30′42″W | Category A | 24842 | Upload another image |
| Belhaven, 1 And 3 Duke Street | | | | 55°59′56″N 2°32′22″W | Category B | 24735 | Upload Photo |
| Belhaven, 4 Duke Street | | | | 55°59′55″N 2°32′23″W | Category C(S) | 24738 | Upload Photo |
| Belhaven, 7 High Street | | | | 55°59′56″N 2°32′17″W | Category C(S) | 24743 | Upload Photo |
| Broxmouth Park, Walled Garden With Tool Sheds And Kitchen Garden And Gatepiers | | | | 55°59′20″N 2°29′05″W | Category C(S) | 1471 | Upload Photo |
| Broxmouth South Lodge With Gatepiers And Quadrants | | | | 55°59′08″N 2°29′10″W | Category A | 1474 | Upload Photo |
| Meikle Pinkerton Dovecot | | | | 55°58′23″N 2°28′40″W | Category B | 1515 | Upload Photo |
| 1 And 2, 3 And 4 5 And 6 North Belton Cottages | | | | 55°59′10″N 2°34′49″W | Category C(S) | 1517 | Upload Photo |
| 15A, 15B, 15C, 15D Victoria Street, 8 Writer's Court Including Boundary Walls | | | | 56°00′15″N 2°30′55″W | Category B | 51778 | Upload Photo |
| Victoria Harbour, Yellowcraig | | | | 56°00′18″N 2°30′56″W | Category B | 24859 | Upload Photo |
| Victoria Street Well-Head | | | | 56°00′16″N 2°30′54″W | Category C(S) | 24863 | Upload Photo |
| 5 Delisle Street | | | | 56°00′07″N 2°31′07″W | Category B | 24761 | Upload Photo |
| Delisle Street, Castellau | | | | 56°00′07″N 2°31′10″W | Category B | 24762 | Upload Photo |
| 71 High Street | | | | 56°00′07″N 2°30′56″W | Category C(S) | 24786 | Upload Photo |
| High Street, 3 Abbeylands | | | | 56°00′02″N 2°30′54″W | Category C(S) | 24799 | Upload Photo |
| High Street, Abbeylands, The Priory | | | | 56°00′02″N 2°30′59″W | Category B | 24801 | Upload Photo |
| 98 And 100 High Street And 1 West Port | | | | 56°00′09″N 2°31′00″W | Category B | 24817 | Upload Photo |
| High Street Close Of 110 | | | | 56°00′09″N 2°31′01″W | Category B | 24823 | Upload Photo |
| High Street, St Anne's Church (Episcopal) | | | | 56°00′12″N 2°31′04″W | Category B | 24828 | Upload Photo |
| Lamer Street Warehouse (Dreadnought) | | | | 56°00′14″N 2°30′51″W | Category B | 24835 | Upload Photo |
| Belhaven, Belhaven Brewery (Maltings, Kilns, Vaults, Brewhouse, Boilerhouse, Chimney, Office, Former Stable And Mill) | | | | 55°59′50″N 2°32′16″W | Category A | 24730 | Upload Photo |
| Belhaven, 8 High Street, Masons Arms | | | | 55°59′56″N 2°32′17″W | Category C(S) | 24744 | Upload Photo |
| Belhaven, North Street, Garden Pavilion Of 1 North Street And Conservatory | | | | 55°59′56″N 2°32′29″W | Category B | 24747 | Upload Photo |
| Belhaven, 9-12 (Inclusive Nos) North Street | | | | 55°59′57″N 2°32′32″W | Category B | 24749 | Upload Photo |
| Belton Dovecot | | | | 55°58′59″N 2°34′10″W | Category B | 1466 | Upload Photo |
| Belton, Gardiner's House | | | | 55°58′51″N 2°34′09″W | Category B | 1467 | Upload Photo |
| Tynefield With Retaining Walls | | | | 55°59′31″N 2°35′46″W | Category B | 1476 | Upload Photo |
| West Barns House With Gatepiers, Railings, And Retaining Walls | | | | 55°59′40″N 2°33′24″W | Category B | 1480 | Upload Photo |
| Countess Road, Viewfield | | | | 55°59′59″N 2°30′54″W | Category B | 24756 | Upload Photo |
| 4 Delisle Street | | | | 56°00′07″N 2°31′07″W | Category B | 24760 | Upload Photo |
| 9 High Street, Barnlea | | | | 56°00′02″N 2°30′49″W | Category B | 24771 | Upload Photo |
| 15 High Street And Stable | | | | 56°00′02″N 2°30′50″W | Category B | 24772 | Upload Photo |
| 21 And 25 High Street | | | | 56°00′03″N 2°30′51″W | Category C(S) | 24773 | Upload Photo |
| 47 And 49 High Street | | | | 56°00′05″N 2°30′54″W | Category B | 24779 | Upload Photo |
| 67 High Street | | | | 56°00′06″N 2°30′54″W | Category B | 24784 | Upload Photo |
| 69 High Street St George Hotel | | | | 56°00′07″N 2°30′55″W | Category B | 24785 | Upload Photo |
| High Street, Town House (Tolbooth) | | | | 56°00′08″N 2°30′56″W | Category A | 24790 | Upload another image |
| High Street, 1 And 2 Abbeylands | | | | 56°00′02″N 2°30′54″W | Category B | 24798 | Upload Photo |
| 68 And 70 High Street | | | | 56°00′07″N 2°30′58″W | Category C(S) | 24809 | Upload Photo |
| Building At Rear 72 High Street Through Close To North | | | | 56°00′07″N 2°30′59″W | Category B | 24811 | Upload Photo |
| 146 And 148 High Street | | | | 56°00′12″N 2°31′02″W | Category C(S) | 24827 | Upload Photo |
| Queen's Road, Parish War Memorial | | | | 55°59′58″N 2°30′43″W | Category B | 24843 | Upload Photo |
| Queen's Road, 1 And 2 Bowmont Terrace | | | | 55°59′53″N 2°30′25″W | Category B | 24845 | Upload Photo |
| Belhaven, Beveridge Row Sycamore Lodge | | | | 55°59′50″N 2°32′26″W | Category B | 24729 | Upload Photo |
| Belhaven, Brewery Lane, Monkscroft, Garden Pavilion/Bothy | | | | 55°59′52″N 2°32′16″W | Category B | 24731 | Upload Photo |
| West Barns, Ardshiel | | | | 55°59′42″N 2°33′19″W | Category C(S) | 1477 | Upload Photo |
| West Barns, Bielside House With Former Windmill | | | | 55°59′47″N 2°33′18″W | Category B | 1478 | Upload Photo |
| Catcraig Limekilns | | | | 55°59′15″N 2°27′30″W | Category B | 1502 | Upload Photo |
| Dunbar Links, The Vaults | | | | 55°59′45″N 2°28′46″W | Category B | 1503 | Upload Photo |
| East Barns, Grieve's House With Garden Walls | | | | 55°58′43″N 2°27′17″W | Category B | 1505 | Upload Photo |
| Lochend Gardener's House And Walled Garden | | | | 55°59′43″N 2°31′02″W | Category C(S) | 1512 | Upload Photo |
| Station Road, Lodge (Former Station Lodge) | | | | 55°59′55″N 2°30′48″W | Category B | 24858 | Upload Photo |
| 28B And 28C Castle Street | | | | 56°00′13″N 2°30′57″W | Category C(S) | 24752 | Upload Photo |
| East Links Road, Lismore And Oriel Cottage | | | | 56°00′00″N 2°30′39″W | Category C(S) | 24767 | Upload Photo |
| 51 And 53 High Street | | | | 56°00′05″N 2°30′54″W | Category B | 24780 | Upload Photo |
| High Street, Abbeylands, Bield | | | | 56°00′01″N 2°30′57″W | Category B | 24800 | Upload Photo |
| 72 And 74 High Street | | | | 56°00′07″N 2°30′58″W | Category B | 24810 | Upload Photo |
| Lamer Island, The Battery | | | | 56°00′22″N 2°30′47″W | Category B | 24831 | Upload Photo |
| 15-19 Lamer Street (Odd Nos) Warehouse/Workshop | | | | 56°00′15″N 2°30′51″W | Category B | 24832 | Upload Photo |
| Marine Road, St Rule's, St Relugas | | | | 56°00′21″N 2°31′34″W | Category B | 24838 | Upload Photo |
| Old Harbour, Quays And Piers (Cromwell Harbour) | | | | 56°00′18″N 2°30′45″W | Category B | 24839 | Upload Photo |
| Queen's Road, Hotel Bellevue | | | | 55°59′55″N 2°30′36″W | Category B | 24844 | Upload Photo |
| Belhaven, Belhaven Road Belhaven Church, Church Of Scotland | | | | 56°00′02″N 2°31′58″W | Category B | 24732 | Upload Photo |
| Belhaven, 1 North Street | | | | 55°59′55″N 2°32′29″W | Category B | 24746 | Upload Photo |
| West Barns, Sherriff Works With Stalk | | | | 55°59′38″N 2°33′18″W | Category B | 1483 | Upload Photo |
| The Brunt Steading | | | | 55°57′20″N 2°30′18″W | Category B | 1501 | Upload Photo |
| 1-6 (Consecutive Nos) Harbour Court, Castle Gate | | | | 56°00′18″N 2°30′55″W | Category B | 51776 | Upload Photo |
| Queen's Road, 12 Bowmont Terrace | | | | 55°59′55″N 2°30′31″W | Category B | 24848 | Upload Photo |
| 5 Shore Street, Also Known As Old Harbour | | | | 56°00′14″N 2°30′49″W | Category C(S) | 24852 | Upload Photo |
| Shore Street, Warehouse | | | | 56°00′14″N 2°30′51″W | Category B | 24854 | Upload Photo |
| 2 Silver Street | | | | 56°00′08″N 2°30′56″W | Category B | 24855 | Upload Photo |
| 7 West Port | | | | 56°00′08″N 2°31′02″W | Category B | 24864 | Upload Photo |
| Delisle Street, Friar's Croft Steading And Horsemill | | | | 56°00′06″N 2°31′08″W | Category B | 24763 | Upload Photo |
| 51A High Street (Through Close) | | | | 56°00′06″N 2°30′55″W | Category B | 24781 | Upload Photo |
| High Street, Mercat Cross | | | | 56°00′07″N 2°30′57″W | Category B | 24791 | Upload Photo |
| 34 High Street | | | | 56°00′04″N 2°30′55″W | Category A | 24802 | Upload Photo |
| 44 High Street | | | | 56°00′05″N 2°30′57″W | Category C(S) | 24804 | Upload Photo |
| 106 And 108 High Street | | | | 56°00′09″N 2°31′00″W | Category B | 24821 | Upload Photo |
| Belhaven, Duke Street, Belhaven House, Lodge, Garden Arch, Entrance Gates, Piers And Walls | | | | 55°59′57″N 2°32′22″W | Category B | 24734 | Upload Photo |
| Belhaven, Edinburgh Road Southfield | | | | 56°00′00″N 2°32′00″W | Category B | 24741 | Upload Photo |
| West Barns, Red Tiles | | | | 55°59′42″N 2°33′20″W | Category C(S) | 1482 | Upload Photo |
| Lochend House, The Ruins Of | | | | 55°59′37″N 2°31′06″W | Category A | 1514 | Upload Photo |

== Key ==
The scheme for classifying buildings in Scotland is:

- Category A: "buildings of national or international importance, either architectural or historic; or fine, little-altered examples of some particular period, style or building type."
- Category B: "buildings of regional or more than local importance; or major examples of some particular period, style or building type, which may have been altered."
- Category C: "buildings of local importance; lesser examples of any period, style, or building type, as originally constructed or moderately altered; and simple traditional buildings which group well with other listed buildings."

In March 2016 there were 47,288 listed buildings in Scotland. Of these, 8% were Category A, and 50% were Category B, with the remaining 42% being Category C.

== See also ==
- List of listed buildings in East Lothian
