= Hero Squad =

- Presented by: Rav Wilding
- Country of origin: United Kingdom
- No. of seasons: 2
- No. of episodes: 20

Production
- Production location: Various

Original release
- Network: CBBC Channel
- Release: 8 October 2012 – 9 October 2013

Related
- Cop School

Hero Squad is a children's television programme that aired on the CBBC Channel from the years of 2012 till 2013. It followed six children around the UK that were trained up by the various emergency services around the UK, who then took part in a staged rescue. Throughout the process of the series the children learnt vital skills needed to be in the emergency services from The Cadets, Royal National Lifeboat Institution lifeboats, Water Rescue, Mountain Rescue and Air Ambulance. The series was hosted by Rav Wilding and was renewed for a second series, which was aired from 9 October 2013 to 11 December 2013 .

== Format ==
Hero Squad followed six children aged 12–14 as they experienced training from all the emergency services around the United Kingdom. The program was hosted by Rav Wilding who lead the children along with a guest mentor for each episode. At the end of the training a "Squad Leader" was elected by the mentor and Wilding; the "Squad Leader" would then lead the other five children in the staged rescue operation using the services state-of-the-art equipment. At the end of the episode, a comment from the mentor was made stating how well they feel the child has done.
