= WFTV Awards =

Women in Film and Television UK Awards list

The Women in Film and Television UK or WFTV Awards are presented in an annual award programme hosted by Women in Film and Television (UK) to the most talented women in UK film, TV and digital media.

== Annual ceremony ==
Since 2019, and except in the year 2020 due to COVID19, the ceremony takes place each year in December at London's Park Lane Hilton Hotel.

== Awards categories (competitive) ==
Each year nominations are being accepted in thirteen categories in total covering all areas of the industry including directing, business, performance, project management and producing.

Once the nomination window closes, independent juries of esteemed people within the film and TV industry will decide on the winners in each category.

Category	Award
Business	* The Barclays Business Award - since 2015
News and factual	* The BBC News and Factual Award - since 2015
Writing	* The Creative Skillset Writing Award - since 2015
Director	* The Deluxe Director Award - since 2015
Producer	* The ENVY Producer Award - since 2015
Project management	* The Film Finances Project Management Award - since 2015
New talent	* The FremantleMedia UK New Talent Award - since 2015
Achievement of the year	* The ITV Studios Achievement of the Year Award - since 2015
Best performance	* The M.A.C Best Performance Award - since 2015
Presenter	* The NEP Visions Presenter Award - since 2015
Presenter	* The NEP UK Presenter Award - since 2015
Presenter	* The EIKON Presenter Award - since 2017
Craft	* The Panalux Craft Award - since 2015
Craft	* The Technicolor Creative Technology Award - since 2015
Contribution to the Medium	* The Argonon Contribution to the Medium Award - since 2015
Lifetime achievement	* The EON Productions Lifetime Achievement Award - since 2015

== Ceremonies ==
	Event	Date	Ref.
20th	2010 WFTV Awards	10 December 2010	
21st	2011 WFTV Awards		
22nd	2012 WFTV Awards	7 December 2012	
23rd	2013 WFTV Awards	6 December 2013	
24th	2014 WFTV Awards	5 December 2014	
25th	2015 WFTV Awards	4 December 2015	
26th	2016 WFTV Awards	2 December 2016	
27th	2017 WFTV Awards	1 December 2017	
28th	2018 WFTV Awards		
29th	2019 WFTV Awards		

	Event	Date	Ref.
17th	2007 WFTV Awards	7 December 2007	
18th	2008 WFTV Awards	5 December 2008	
19th	2009 WFTV Awards	4 December 2009	

== Award winners ==
=== 2010 ===
Category	Recipient(s) / Work	Ref.
The Barclays Business Award	Lisbeth Savill	
The BBC News and Factual Award	Alex Crawford	
The Skillset Creative Originality Award	Beeban Kidron	
The Ascent142 Best Director Award	Andrea Arnold	
The ENVY Producer Award	Nira Park	
The talkbackTHAMES New Talent Award	Jo Ho	
The ITV Achievement of the Year Award	Beryl, Debbie & Sue Vertue	
The Pinewood Studios Best Performance Award	Carey Mulligan	
The Panalux Craft Award	Nicola Berwick	
The UK Film Council Writing Award	Jane Goldman	
The Littlestar Services Contribution to the Medium Award	Sue Murphy	
The EON Productions Lifetime Achievement Award	Sheila Hancock	

=== 2012 ===
Category	Recipient(s) / Work	Ref.
The Barclays Business Award	Nicky Sargent and Vikki Dunn	
The BBC News and Factual Award	Jackie Faulkner	
The Creative Skillset Inspirational Woman Award	Barbara Slater	
The Deluxe Digital London Director Award	Lynne Ramsay	
The ENVY Producer Award	Tracey Seaward	
The International Film Guarantors Project Management Award	Emma Zee	
The FremantleMedia UK New Talent Award	Sally El Hosaini	
The ITV Studios Achievement of the Year Award	Clare Balding	
The M.A.C Best Performance Award	Olivia Colman	
The Channel 4 Female Indie Of The Year Award	Nicola Shindler	
The Panalux Craft Award	Caroline O’reilly	
The Technicolor Writing Award	Heidi Thomas	
The Broadcast & Screen Contribution To The Medium Award	Jana Bennett	
The EON Production Lifetime Achievement Award	Ruth Caleb	

=== 2013 ===
Category	Recipient(s) / Work	Ref.
The Barclays Business Award	Danielle Lux	
The BBC News and Factual Award	Anna Hall (filmmaker)	
The Creative Skillset Inspirational Woman Award	Ronke Phillips	
The Deluxe Digital Cinema Director Award	Clio Barnard	
The ENVY Producer Award	Pippa Harris	
The Film Finances Project Management Award	Rosa Romero	
The FremantleMedia UK New Talent Award	Kelly Marcel	
The ITV Studios Achievement of the Year Award	Penny Woolcock	
The M.A.C Best Performance Award	Sheridan Smith	
The NEP Visions Presenter Award	Mary Beard	
The Panalux Craft Award	Julie Ritson	
The Technicolor Writing Award	Sally Wainwright	
The Argonon Contribution to the Medium Award	Penny Eyles	
The EON Lifetime Achievement Award	Angela Rippon	

=== 2014 ===
Category	Recipient(s) / Work	Ref.
The Barclays Business Award	Jane Turton	
The BBC News and Factual Award	Sara Hardy and Blue Ryan	
The Creative Skillset Writing Award	Lucy Kirkwood	
The Deluxe Digital Cinema Director Award	Joanna Hogg	
The ENVY Producer Award	Kate Swinden	
The Film Finances Project Management Award	Sue Quinn	
The FremantleMedia UK New Talent Award	Daisy Jacobs	
The ITV Studios Achievement of the Year Award	Lyse Doucet	
The M.A.C Best Performance Award	Rosamund Pike	
The NEP Visions Presenter Award	Mel Giedroyc and Sue Perkins	
The Panalux Craft Award	Consolata Boyle	
The Technicolor Creative Technology Award	Kate Hopkins	
The Argonon Contribution to the Medium Award	Julie Baines	
The EON Lifetime Achievement Award	Vanessa Redgrave	

=== 2015 ===
Category	Recipient(s) / Work	Ref.
The Barclays Business Award	Marigo Kehoe	
The BBC News and Factual Award	Tulip Mazumdar	
The Creative Skillset Writing Award	Sharon Horgan	
The Deluxe Director Award	Amma Asante	
The ENVY Producer Award	Leslee Udwin	
The Film Finances Project Management Award	Betty Williams	
The FremantleMedia UK New Talent Award	Regina Moriarty	
The ITV Studios Achievement of the Year Award	Sandi Toksvig	
The M.A.C Best Performance Award	Charlotte Rampling	
The NEP Visions Presenter Award	Mishal Husain	
The Panalux Craft Award	Sarah Greenwood	
The Technicolor Creative Technology Award	Gillian Dodders	
The Argonon Contribution to the Medium Award	Kim Longinotto	
The EON Productions Lifetime Achievement Award	Joanna Lumley	

=== 2016 ===
Category	Recipient(s) / Work	Ref.
The Barclays Business Award	Amanda Nevill	
The BBC News and Factual Award	Laura Kuenssberg	
The Creative Skillset Writing Award	Julia Davis	
The Deluxe Director Award	Sarah Gavron	
The ENVY Producer Award	Tania Alexander	
The Film Finances Project Management Award	Tarn Harper	
The FremantleMedia UK New Talent Award	Michaela Coel	
The ITV Studios Achievement of the Year Award	Beryl Richards	
The M.A.C Best Performance Award	Sarah Lancashire	
The NEP Visions Presenter Award	Gabby Logan	
The Panalux Craft Award	Carolina Schmidtholstein	
The Technicolor Creative Technology Award	Sara Bennett	
The Argonon Contribution to the Medium Award	Nina Gold	
The EON Productions Lifetime Achievement Award	Beryl Vertue, CBE	

=== 2017 ===
Category	Recipient(s) / Work	Ref.
The Barclays Business Award	Jane Root	
The BBC News and Factual Award	Elhum Shakerifar	
The Creative Skillset Writing Award	Nicole Taylor	
The Deluxe Director Award	Philippa Lowthorpe	
The ENVY Producer Award	Susan Hogg	
The Film Finances Project Management Award	Marianne Jenkins	
The FremantleMedia UK New Talent Award	Daisy May Cooper	
The ITV Studios Achievement of the Year Award	Waad Al-Kateab	
The M.A.C Best Performance Award	Gemma Whelan	
The EIKON Presenter Award	Nadiya Hussain	
The Panalux Craft Award	Susan Stein	
The Technicolor Creative Technology Award	Úna Ní Dhonghaíle	
The Argonon Contribution to the Medium Award	Nicola Shindler	
The EON Productions Lifetime Achievement Award	Celia Imrie	

=== 2018 ===
Category	Recipient(s) / Work	Ref.
The Barclays Business Award	Lucy Ainsworth Taylor, Angela Barson	
The BBC News and Factual Award	Deeyah Khan	
The Technicolor Creative Technology Award	Selina MacArthur	
The Panalux Craft Award	Eunice Huthart	
The ENVY Producer Award	Gill Isles	
The EIKON Presenter Award	Sandi Toksvig	
The Film Finances Project Management Award	Arabella Gilbert	
The Netflix New Talent Award	Rungano Nyoni	
The ITV Studios Achievement of the Year Award	Jameela Jamil	
The Deluxe Director Award	Hettie Macdonald	
The Screen Skills Writing Award	Phoebe Waller-Bridge	
The Pinewood Studios Best Performance Award	Nicola Walker	
The Argonon Contribution to the Medium Award	Norma Percy	
The EON Productions Lifetime Achievement Award	Juliet Stevenson	

=== 2019 ===
Category	Recipient(s) / Work	Ref.
The Barclays Business Award	Jane Featherstone	
The BBC News and Factual Award	Katya Adler	
The Technicolor Creative Technology Award	Emma Oxley	
The Panalux Craft Award	Judi Lee-Headman	
The ENVY Producer Award	Faye Ward	
The EIKON Presenter Award	Claudia Winkleman	
The Film Finances Project Management Award	Jo Burn	
The Netflix New Talent Award	Laurie Nunn	
The ITV Studios Achievement of the Year Award	Cherylee Houston	
The Deluxe Director Award	Jessica Hobbs	
The Screen Skills Writing Award	Lisa McGee	
The Pinewood Studios Best Performance Award	Samantha Morton	
The Argonon Contribution to the Medium Award	Dorothy Byrne	
The EON Productions Lifetime Achievement Award	Floella Benjamin	

=== 2020 ===
Event cancelled due to Covid restrictions, no awards presented

=== 2021 ===
Category	Recipient(s) / Work	Ref.
The Premiere Business Award	Angela Ferreira	
The BBC News and Factual Award	Emily Maitlis & Sam McAllister	
The Gravity Media Creative Technology Award	Kate Davis	
The MBS Equipment Co Craft Award	Ilana Garrard	
The ENVY Producer Award	Anna Hall	
The EIKON Presenter Award	Stacey Dooley	
The iMDB Project Management Award	Alex Boyd	
The Netflix New Talent Award	Lisa Walters	
The ITV Studios Achievement of the Year Award	Nahrein Kemp	
The Company 3 Director Award	Jenny Ash	
The Screen Skills Writing Award	Michaela Coel	
The Argonon Best Performance Award	Wunmi Mosaku	
The Argonon Contribution to the Medium Award	Charlotte Moore	
The EON Productions Lifetime Achievement Award	Glenda Jackson	

=== 2022 ===
Category	Recipient(s) / Work	Ref.
The Mercury Studios Business Award	Akua Gyamfi	
The BBC News and Factual Award	Ramita Navai	
The Gravity Media Creative Technology Award	Nainita Desai	
The MBS Equipment Co Craft Award	Nicola Daley ACS	
The ENVY Producer Award	Surian Fletcher-Jones	
The EIKON Presenter Award	Davina McCall	
The iMDB Project Management Award	Claire Newton	
The Netflix New Talent Award	Nicôle Lecky	
The ITV Studios Achievement of the Year Award	Emma Butt	
The Company 3 Director Award	Nida Manzoor	
The Screen Skills Writing Award	Kayleigh Llewellyn	
The Argonon Best Performance Award	Claire Rushbrook	
The Disney+ Contribution to the Medium Award	Nadine Marsh Edwards	
The EON Productions Lifetime Achievement Award	Sue Barker	

== Patrons ==
WFTV UK Patrons include:

- Gurinder Chadha
- Elizabeth Karlsen
- Sandi Toksvig
