= Jenny Ash =

British documentary filmmaker

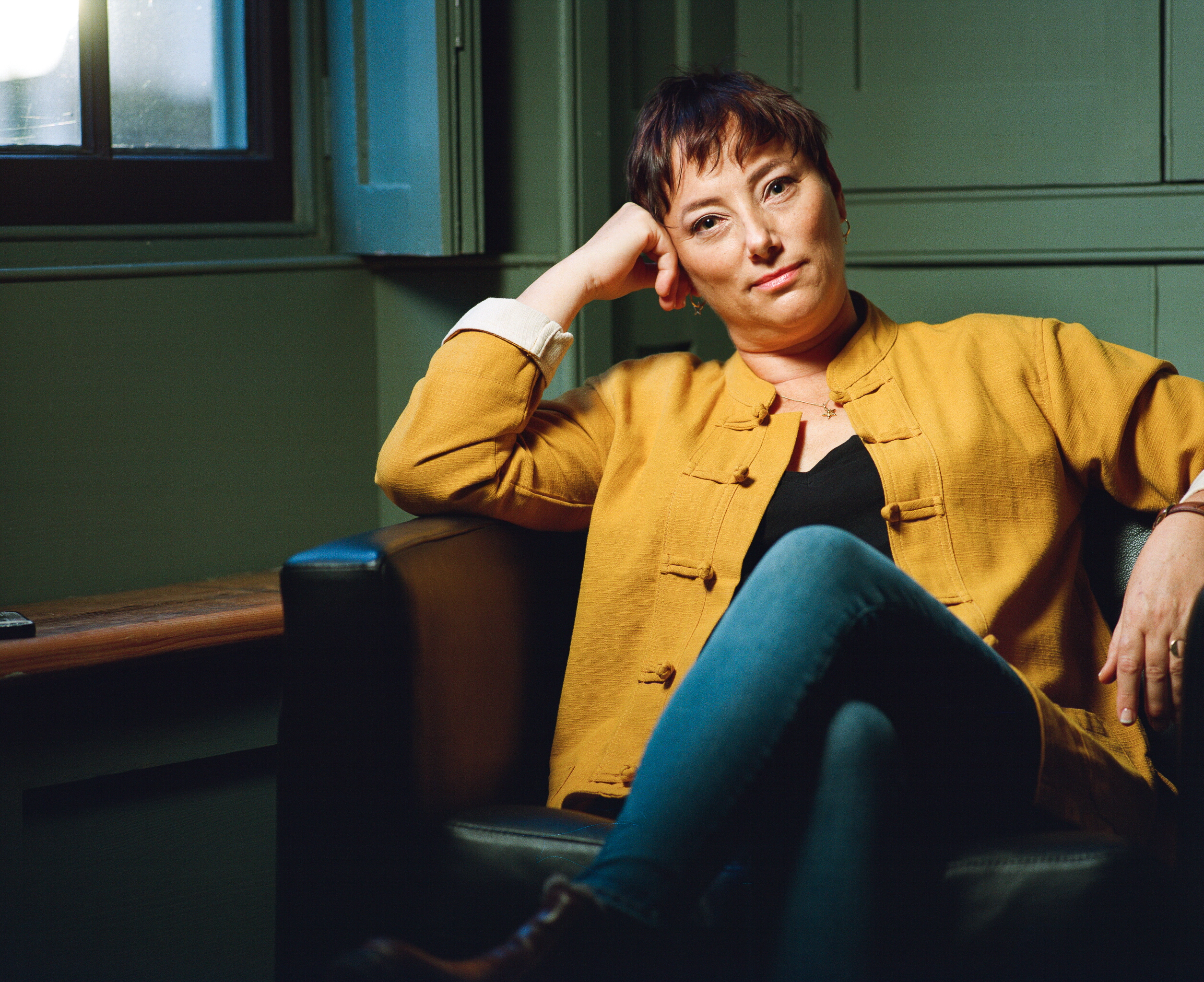
- Born: United Kingdom
- Occupations: Documentary film director and writer
- Years active: 2000s–present
- Notable work: Angry, White and American (2017); 100 Vaginas (2019); The World's Biggest Murder Trial: Nuremberg (2020); Bin Laden: The Road to 9/11 (2021); Flight 149: Hostage of War (2025)
- Website: www.jennyash.co.uk

Jenny Ash is a British film and television director and writer. Ash has directed major feature documentaries across various genres for broadcasters such as Sky, Channel 4, the BBC, ITV, and the History Channel. Some of her notable films include The World's Biggest Murder Trial: Nuremberg (Channel 5, 2020), Bin Laden: The Road to 9/11 (Channel 4, 2021), and Flight 149: Hostage of War (2025). In 2021, Ash became the first documentary director to win the WFTV Best Director Award.

== Career ==
Ash began her directing career in British television drama, working on series such as Waterloo Road (BBC One), Personal Affairs (BBC Three), and Missing (BBC One).

Her early documentary work included Dolly Parton: Platinum Blonde (BBC One), and The Pity of War (ITV), a drama-documentary starring John Hurt as the poet Siegfried Sassoon. She also directed for the 2010 Emmy-winning series America: The Story of Us (History Channel), which focused on slavery and the Civil War. As a writer on the History Channel's America: The Story of Us (2010), Ash shared a Primetime Emmy nomination for Outstanding Writing for Nonfiction Programming.

Ash directed the ITV drama-documentary The Pity of War (2016), starring John Hurt, about the poets Wilfred Owen and Siegfried Sassoon. She also directed Gary Younge's political road-trip documentary Angry, White and American (2017, Channel 4). The documentary, which discussed race and identity in the United States, was nominated for the Grierson Awards. In addition, Ash has produced a series of short anti-war films for Channel 4 featuring actors Sean Bean, Gemma Arterton, Stephen Graham, and Sophie Okonedo.

In 2019, Ash produced the film 100 Vaginas for Channel 4. Its companion film, Me and My Penis was released in 2020 on Channel 4. The following year, The World's Biggest Murder Trial: Nuremberg (2020, Channel 5), which was nominated for Royal Television Society and Banff awards.

In 2020, she directed Bin Laden: The Road to 9/11 (Channel 4), a three-part series that traced Osama bin Laden's radicalisation through the accounts of those who knew him personally.

Ash's feature documentary Flight 149: Hostage of War (Sky Documentaries, 2025) premiered at the 2025 South by Southwest Film & TV Festival (SXSW Festival). The film investigates the controversial landing of British Airways Flight 149 in Kuwait on the eve of Saddam Hussein's invasion, and the subsequent detention of the flight's passengers and crew.

In addition to her film and television work, Ash has directed commercials for companies such as Virgin Atlantic, Google, British Airways, LG, BT, Always, Tena, and the Rwandan Genocide Museum.

== Selected filmography ==
- The Pity of War (2016, ITV) – director/writer
- Angry, White and American (2017, Channel 4) – director
- 100 Vaginas (2019, Channel 4) – director/writer. The film was nominated for RTS and Broadcast awards.
- Me and My Penis (2020, Channel 4) – director
- The World's Biggest Murder Trial: Nuremberg (2020, Channel 5) – director
- Bin Laden: The Road to 9/11 (2021, Channel 4; 3×60') – director
- Flight 149: Hostage of War (2025, Sky Documentaries) – director/writer

== Awards and honours ==
- Royal Television Society Programme Award nomination for The World's Biggest Murder Trial: Nuremberg (2020)
- Primetime Emmy Award nomination (team), Outstanding Writing for Nonfiction Programming, for America: The Story of Us (2010)
- 42nd NAACP Image Award (2011), for America: The Story of Us – "Part 4"
- Banff Mountain Film Festival award nomination for The World's Biggest Murder Trial: Nuremberg (2020)
- WFTV Award winner (The Company 3 Director Award, 2021)
