= Scam Interceptors =

British television series

- Presented by: Rav Wilding; Nick Stapleton
- Starring: Jim Browning
- Country of origin: United Kingdom
- Original language: English
- No. of series: 5
- No. of episodes: 62

Production
- Executive producer: Rowland Stone
- Producer: Sherry Knight

Original release
- Network: BBC One
- Release: 4 April 2022 – present

Scam Interceptors is a British factual television programme about Internet fraud. Inspired by a 2020 episode of Panorama featuring ethical hacker Jim Browning, the programme shows a television team (including presenters Rav Wilding and Nick Stapleton, Browning and others) as they monitor and intervene in scams in progress. The programme has a greater focus on the victims and preventing actual live scams taking place than the Panorama episode. The show is filmed mostly inside the BBC Pacific Quay studios in Glasgow.

== Format ==
In the programme, the television team finds telephone scams that are in progress, and sends calls and texts to victims to alert them. The first series of Scam Interceptors featured Crimewatch-style additional content, and revealed that most fraud in the United Kingdom was perpetrated from industrial-scale scamming call centres in Asia. The second series, released in 2023, also identifies individuals involved in scamming.

== Awards ==
Scam Interceptors was nominated for a BAFTA Award for best daytime show in 2023. A repeat of series one was aired during primetime.

In May 2024, Scam Interceptors won the Daytime award for best daytime series at the 2024 British Academy Television Awards.

Scam Interceptors won a BAFTA Television Award for best daytime show in 2026.
