= Felix Scott =

British actor

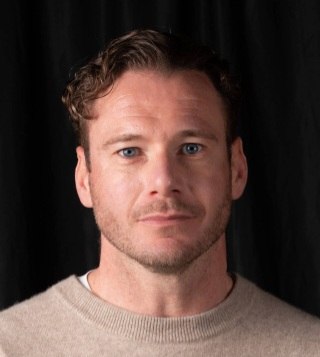
- Born: January 6, 1982 (age 44)
- Occupation: Actor
- Years active: 2005–present

Felix Scott is a British actor who played the role of Charlie Thomas in the BBC Radio 4 soap The Archers. His first episode was broadcast 14 April 2014, and his final episode on 24 January 2016.

He has also appeared in the television series Holby City, Doc Martin, Wolf Hall, No Offence, and Missing, as well as in the 2010 film Inception.

In 2017 he starred along Ayesha Antoine in the play "Dirty Great Love Story" at the Arts Theatre in London.

From the 6 September 2022 to 8 January 2023 at the Criterion Theatre, Felix starred as Sam in the West End show 2:22 A Ghost Story.

He also portrayed Buzz Aldrin in The Crown.

He currently plays Patrick Nash in Series 2, 3, 4 and 5 of Miss Scarlet and The Duke. He does not appear in Series 6, but is confirmed to be returning for the final 7th series.

He also appeared as Rev Fulwar Craven Fowle in episodes 1, 2, and 4 of the 2025 series Miss Austen.

In addition, he has featured as 'Christopher' in the 5th episode of series 2 of British comedy Juice, and as Paul in BBC Radio 4's drama Like A Brother, part of their "Secrets and Lies" series.

In 2026 Scott portrayed Radimir Petrovsky in the series Star City.
