= Jon Magnusson (producer) =

British producer, writer and director (born 1965)

- Born: May 1965 (age 61)
- Occupations: Television producer, writer and director
- Parents: Magnus Magnusson (father); Mamie Baird (mother)
- Relatives: Sally Magnusson (sister)

Jon Magnusson (born May 1965) is a British producer, writer and director. He is the son of Magnus Magnusson, the original presenter of Mastermind and Mamie Baird, a journalist, and a brother of TV presenter Sally Magnusson.

Magnusson produced the medical sketch show Struck Off and Die, several editions of the spoof radio panel game I'm Sorry I Haven't a Clue, and episodes of the sketch series Bremner, Bird and Fortune and Alas Smith and Jones on television. He wrote the original music for the 1994 BBC Radio 4 series 'The Skivers'.

He has a long involvement with Graham Norton, as producer of So Graham Norton (1999), Graham Norton's Bigger Picture (2005), and series producer of The Graham Norton Show (2009–2018).

Magnusson was awarded a BAFTA for Best Entertainment Programme or Series for The Graham Norton Show in 2013, and for So Graham Norton in 2001, and was nominated for the same award for the same programme in 2000. Magnusson was also nominated for another BAFTA, the Best Light Entertainment award, for impressionist show Rory Bremner, Who Else?

Magnusson credits Mel Smith and Griff Rhys Jones ("the Guv'nors") with teaching him to write comedy, and has written for Bremner, Bird and Fortune and So Graham Norton.
