= London School of Philosophy =

Coordinates: 51.519722°N 0.118333°W

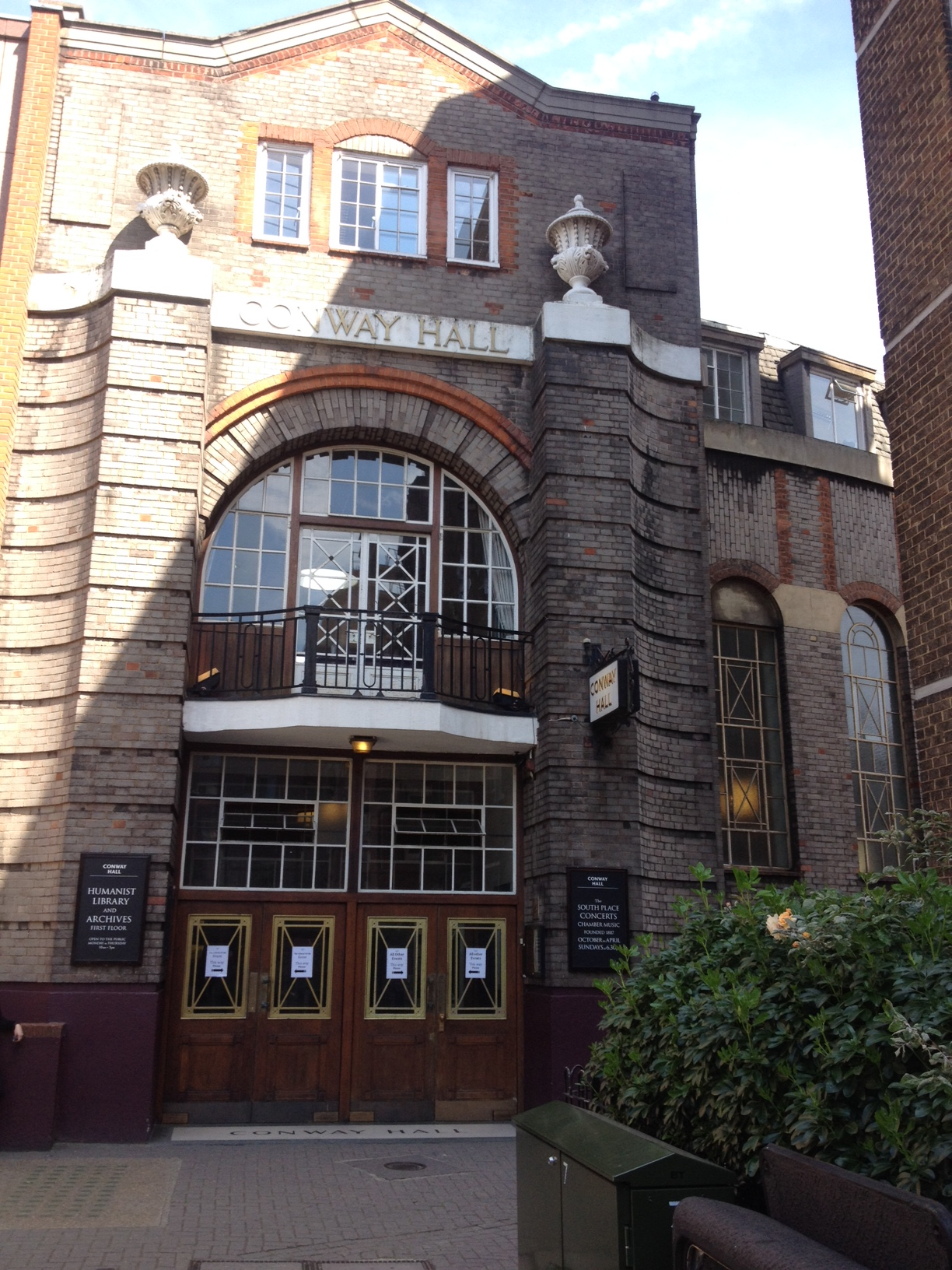
- Main entrance of Conway Hall, home of the London School of Philosophy
- Motto: Philosophy for the Capital
- Type: Adult education
- Established: Incorporated 2010; First lectures 2011
- Affiliations: Independent
- Location: London, United Kingdom
- Website: londonschoolofphilosophy.org

The London School of Philosophy is an independent adult education college located in London, United Kingdom. It offers part-time non-degree courses on a wide range of topics within philosophy. It was founded in 2010 by lecturers from Birkbeck College. It is based within Conway Hall, in Bloomsbury.

== History ==
In 2009, the long-established School of Continuing Education at Birkbeck, University of London, which specialised in extra-mural studies, was abolished and its activities integrated into the main college. The following year, as part of this re-organisation, the number of part-time philosophy courses for adults was sharply reduced. Seven of Birkbeck's philosophy lecturers responded to the cancellation of their courses by meeting to establish a new college, the London School of Philosophy (LSP).

The LSP's seven founders organised themselves on a cooperative basis and agreed a constitution in 2010. The first lectures took place in January 2011. A launch event was held on 6 September 2011.

== Location ==
In 2011 the London School of Philosophy announced a collaborative agreement with Conway Hall to base all its teaching activities there.

Conway Hall is a large art-deco building on Red Lion Square in Bloomsbury, built in 1929. It is the venue for a wide range of concerts, lectures and other cultural events. The building also houses the Humanist Library, which includes a sizeable philosophy section.

== Courses ==
Courses at the college cover topics such as ‘Philosophy and Theatre’, ‘Philosophy of Love’; ‘Existentialism’; and ‘Philosophy and Biology’ alongside others on ethics, aesthetics and the history of philosophy.

== Summer Schools ==
In 2013 the London School of Philosophy for the first time entered a collaborative arrangement with Birkbeck's Department of Philosophy and with Conway Hall, to offer a Summer School on philosophy, which was held over several days at the beginning of July.

The LSP's second annual Summer School, in 2014, was a collaboration with Heythrop College and Conway Hall. The speakers included Professor John Cottingham, Professor Keith Ward, Dr Anna Abram, Dr Piers Benn, Dr Stephen Law and Dr Adam Stewart-Wallace (all from Heythrop), Dr Shahrar Ali, Dr Keith Barrett and Dr Anja Steinbauer (from London School of Philosophy) and special guest speakers Dr Roger Scruton, emeritus Professor Richard Norman (Kent) and Professor Ken Gemes (Birkbeck).

== Student life ==
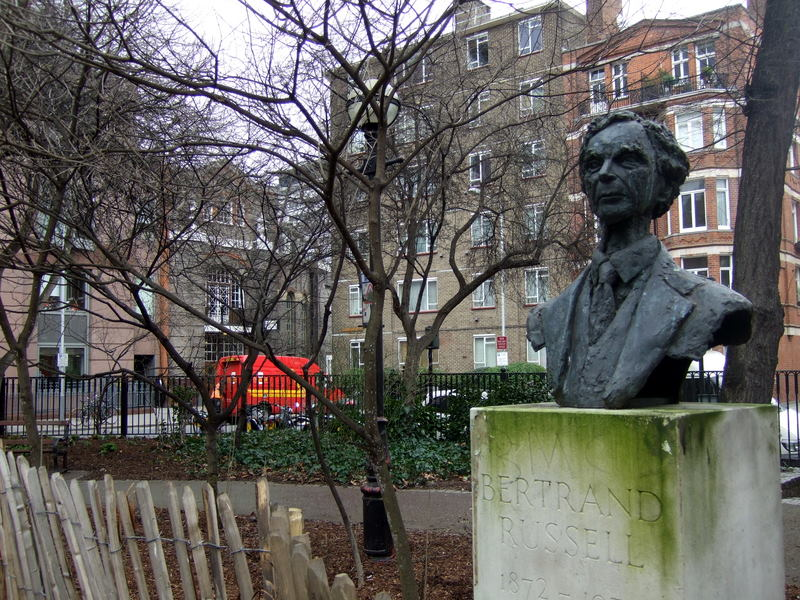
Bust of Bertrand Russell in front of Conway Hall - geograph.org.uk - 1801595

As the London School of Philosophy offers only part-time courses, student life is not centralised. The college does not offer halls of residence. At lunchtimes, LSP students often gather at the open-air Park Café in Red Lion Square Gardens.
