= Scotland's Churches Trust =

Scottish registered charity

Scotland’s Churches Trust
- Urras eaglaisean na h-Alba
- Formation: 2012
- Purpose: To promote understanding of and preserve Scotland’s churches and places of worship of all denominations.
- Headquarters: Scotland’s Churches Trust
- Location: 15 North Bank Street, Edinburgh, EH1 2LP
- Director: Dr DJ Johnston-Smith
- Website: scotlandschurchestrust.org.uk
- Formerly called: Scottish Churches Architectural Heritage Trust and Scotland’s Churches Scheme

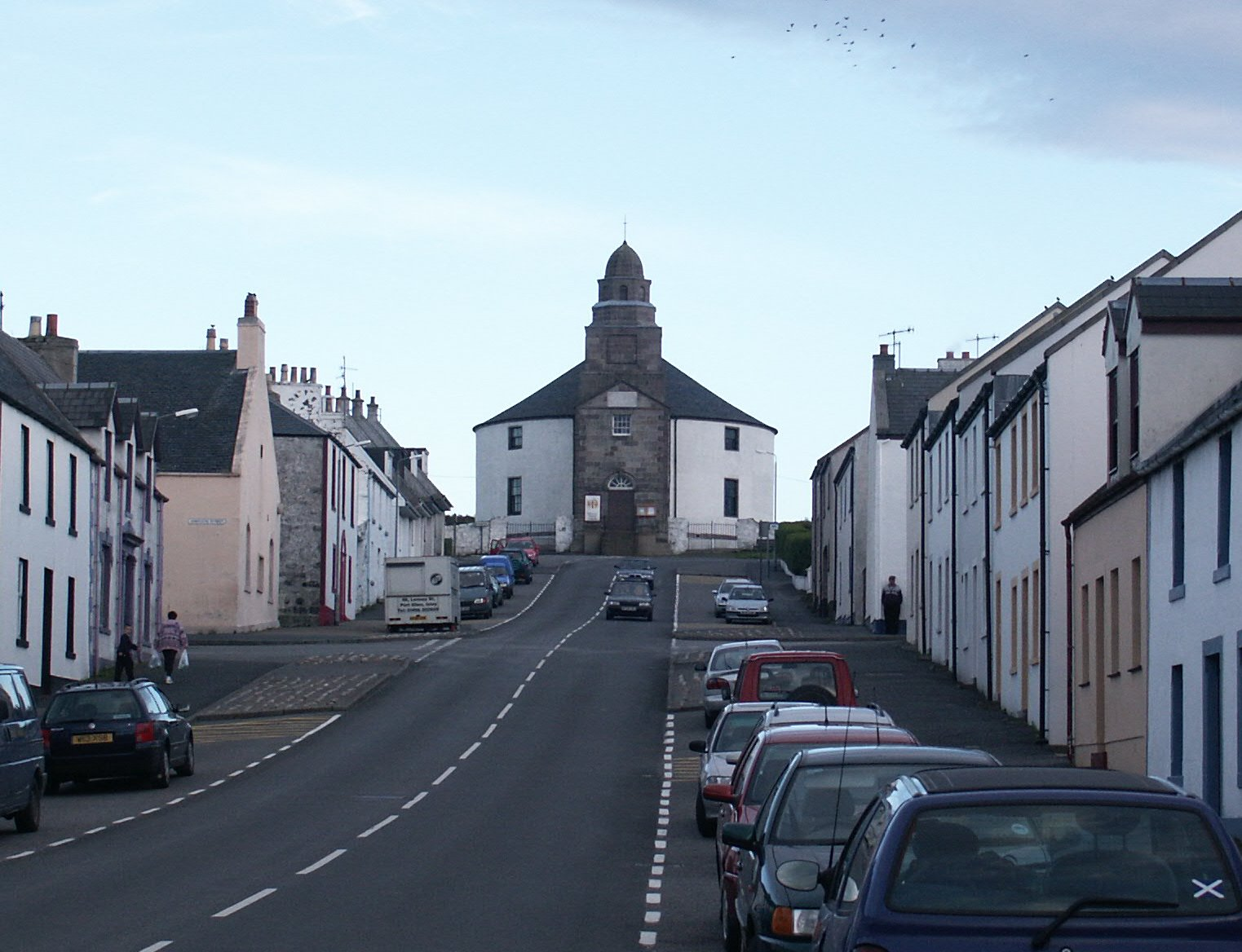
Kilarrow Parish Church, one of the first churches to benefit from grant funding from Scottish Churches Architectural Heritage Trust

Scotland's Churches Trust is a Scottish registered charity whose “aims are to advance the preservation, promotion and understanding of Scotland’s rich architectural heritage represented in its churches and places of worship of all denominations.” Its principal activities are “promoting heritage and tourism” and “giving of grants”. It primarily carries out these activities by offering financial support and practical advice for church repairs and modernisation projects, organ recitals and concerts, a church recording scheme and by promoting its fourteen Pilgrim Journeys across Scotland, that include over 500 places of current or former worship.

Formed in 2012 from two older built heritage organisations, the Scottish Churches Architectural Heritage Trust and Scotland's Churches Scheme, it currently has over 1300 churches in its membership.

== History ==
In 1974, broadcaster and writer Magnus Magnusson created The Steeplechase fundraising scheme to help raise funds to preserve Scotland's churches. In 1978 he became the founding chairperson of the Scottish Churches Architectural Heritage Trust, a position he held until 1985. Its primary aim was to assist congregations in the preservation and upkeep of their buildings.

In 1980, the board invited noted fundraiser Florence MacKenzie (1935-2010) to become the Trust's director, in which post she remained until her retirement in 2009. MacKenzie was granted an MBE for her services to the restoration of church buildings in 1996. Other former trustees include Lady Marion Fraser and Lord Penrose.

During its first three decades SCAHT was instrumental in preserving “churches of all sizes – historic and small country kirks as well as synagogues”. These buildings include Kilarrow Parish Church in Islay, St Magnus' in Orkney, St Marnoch's in Angus, Sacred Heart in Wigton, Yester Parish Church in East Lothian and St Michael and All Angels, Inverness.

Founded in 1996, Scotland's Churches Scheme was an ecumenical membership charitable trust that assisted “living” churches work together and make their buildings the focus of their communities by regularly opening their doors and sharing their history and heritage. Among other activities, the Scheme provided a series of “how-to” guides to assist its member churches in researching and presenting their stories, secure their buildings, welcome visitors and record and interpret their graveyards. It also published a series of Regional Guides listing the history and architectural heritage of ecclesiastical buildings across Scotland.

In 2012 the Scottish Churches Architectural Heritage Trust and Scotland's Churches Scheme merged to form Scotland's Churches Trust. HRH Princess Anne, Princess Royal became its patron and Dr Brian Fraser its first Director. In 2013 the SCT launched Scotland’s Pilgrim Journeys, a collection of six trails across Scotland that encompassed the medieval tradition pilgrim visits to ecclesiastical sites with contemporary faith tourism.

In recent years the Trust has provided grants towards the costs of major fabric works and minor maintenance activities. It also offers financial support to church organists seeking to improve their skills and churches offering organ concerts. Its Scottish Pilgrim Journeys initiative has been increased from six to fourteen different trails across the country.

== Governance ==
- Patron: HRH Princess Anne, Princess Royal KG, KT, GCVO, GCStJ, QSO, CD
- Hon President: Robin Blair CVO, WS

Vice Presidents:

- Rt Rev Dr John Armes, Bishop of Edinburgh
- Prof Andrew Calder MBE
- Lady Catherine Gill
- Sir Boyd Tunnock CBE
- Prof John Hume OBE

Trustees:

- Annette Brydone
- David Clark
- Prof Adam Cumming
- Col Jamie Erskine MBE
- Carole McBride
- Dr Joe Morrow CBE, KStJ, KC, DL, FRSE Lord Lyon King of Arms
- Caroline Sibbald
- Ros Taylor RIBA
- Very Rev Prof Iain Torrance KCVO, Kt, OStJ, TD, FRSE

- Director: Dr DJ Johnston-Smith
- Chairperson, Board of Trustees: Prof Adam Cumming
- Chairperson, Grants Committee: Ros Taylor RIBA
