= Jamie Belman =

English actor

Jamie Belman is an English actor, best known for his work in television series Emmerdale playing Michael Conway.

== Career ==
After starting his career on stage, in 2009, Belman had a minor role in a couple of episodes of the ITV police drama series The Bill, playing Ben Meadows (replacing Kieran Bew after his portrayal of the character in 2005 and 2006), the son of well-known established character DCI Jack Meadows, played by Simon Rouse . Belman appeared in the Manchester-based Channel 4 show Shameless, later appearing in Personal Affairs, Midsomer Murders, Missing and Runaway. Belman left Emmerdale on 1 October 2009. Belman was cast in Turnout, a film released in 2011.

== Personal life ==
Belman was engaged to Czech model Petra Němcová, but the couple ended their relationship in April 2012.
