= BC: The Archaeology of the Bible Lands =

1970s BBC television series

BC: The Archaeology of the Bible Lands was a BBC television series from the 1970s. It investigated the archaeology of the Bible lands. It was presented by Magnus Magnusson. The consultant on Biblical archaeology was James B. Pritchard of the University of Pennsylvania, where he was professor of religious thought and the first curator of Biblical archaeology at the University Museum. A book of the programmes was published in March 1977. There were twelve programmes in the series, each of an hour duration, and the book's twelve chapters share their titles and subject matter.

The first programme was shown on BBC2 on 20 January 1977 following filming the previous year in Egypt, Jordan, Israel, Syria and Iraq. The rest were shown at weekly intervals.

The purpose and tone of the programmes is indicated by this extract from the Foreword that Dr Pritchard wrote for the book:

The scene of scholarly debate has long been curtained off from the general public, with the excuse that the layman cannot understand. One may believe, as I do, that the specialist has underestimated his wider public, or has found himself incapable of presenting involved arguments to a general audience. In this book these conflicting views have been brought into the open. The reader is allowed to see and hear the doubters as well as the believers, to learn of ingenious theories and their rebuttal — in fact, to face candidly some of the hard questions that have for so long perplexed scholars as they have tried to reconcile what has been handed down in the Bible with the artefacts which have come up from archaeological excavations in the lands of the Bible. At long last the intelligent onlooker has been given a chance to participate, to make up his mind about possible alternatives.

== Episodes ==
No.	Title	Original release date	Prod. code
1	"In the Beginning"	20 January 1977	TBA
What is the Bible? How did it come to be written? To what historical events does it truly relate?
2	"The Abraham Years"	27 January 1977	TBA
Was Abraham a nomad or a wealthy caravaneer? Genesis chapters 11 and 12 were confidently dated to 2,000 BC. Was Abraham an historical figure at all?
3	"Bondage in Egypt"	3 February 1977	TBA
Despite the mass of written records left by the Egyptians there is no mention of the Israelites in their land.
4	"Exodus"	10 February 1977	TBA
Why is there so little archaeological evidence for the places mentioned in the Book of Exodus? Perhaps there never was an exodus?
5	"Land of Milk and Honey"	17 February 1977	TBA
Were the Canaanites really wicked? Did the conquest of Canaan take place as the Bible describes it?
6	"The Philistines"	24 February 1977	TBA
These seafaring people clash first with the Egyptians and then with the Israelites. Archaeological discoveries in Israel put anew perspective on the exploits of Samson.
7	"The House of David"	3 March 1977	TBA
Judah and Israel are united under David. James Pritchard's discovery of the Pool of Gibeon in the 1960s was a high point in Biblical archaeology.
8	"Jerusalem, The Golden"	10 March 1977	TBA
This programme visits the Bible Lands in search of Solomon and his allies, the Phoenicians, who invented alphabetic writing.
9	"A House Divided"	17 March 1977	TBA
Israel and Judah separate. In the north Canaanite gods like Baal are again worshipped but Judah struggles to maintain the true way of Jehovah.
10	"The Wolf on the Fold"	24 March 1977	TBA
The Assyrians destroy the kingdom of Israel and threaten the southern kingdom of Judah. When they fail to take Jerusalem the Assyrians destroy Lachish and commemorate their triumph with stone reliefs on the royal palace at Nineveh.
11	"By the Rivers of Babylon"	31 March 1977	TBA
It has been suggested that it was during the 50 year exile of the Jews that the Old Testament was written to encourage the Children of Israel to keep faith and to provide hope for the future. This controversial theory is considered against the rise and fall of the Babylonian empire.
12	"The End of the Old"	7 April 1977	TBA
This last programme takes the Jews to a new Jerusalem and a new Temple. The classical era of the Greeks and Romans saw a cultural and religious clash that the Dead Sea scrolls reveal. The first Jewish revolt against the Romans in 70 AD was crushed by the final destruction of the Jerusalem Temple and the ending of Jewish resistance at Masada.
