= Mamie Magnusson =

Scottish newspaperwoman and author

- Born: Mamie Ian Baird; 24 October 1925; Rutherglen, Scotland
- Died: 12 April 2012 (aged 86); Balmore, Scotland
- Known for: Newspaper journalist and author
- Spouse: Magnus Magnusson (m. 1954; died 2007)
- Children: 5; including Sally and Jon
- Relatives: Archie Baird (brother)

Mamie Ian Magnusson (née Baird; 24 October 1925 – 12 April 2012) was a pioneering Scottish newspaper journalist and author.

== Early life ==
Baird and her twin sister Anna were born to a working class household in Rutherglen in 1925.

Baird's middle name, Ian, was because her father, John (a caretaker 2at Bankhead Primary School) had been expecting a boy. Her brother, Archie Baird, was a noted footballer for Aberdeen and Scotland in addition to being an escapee from a German prisoner-of-war camp.

The two sisters attended Rutherglen Academy where Baird's desire to become a journalist was well known. Her Latin teacher mentioned the fact to a senior member of staff at The Sunday Post newspaper during a chance meeting. Baird was invited to submit a piece of writing which she submitted in a journalistic style and was rewarded with her first job in journalism as a result.

== Career ==
Baird began her career as a journalist aged seventeen working for The Sunday Post in the nineteen forties before eventually being headhunted in 1947 by the Scottish Daily Express, the biggest selling daily newspaper of the time.

Her big scoop came in October that year when she visited Birkhall in Royal Deeside where Queen Elizabeth and the Duke of Edinburgh were honeymooning. Though expecting to be turned away, Baird was surprised to be invited inside and was therefore able to give her readers an exclusive glimpse inside their honeymoon suite during a period of high interest in the newlyweds.

It was also while working at the Scottish Daily Express that she met her future husband, the writer and presenter Magnus Magnusson. The couple married in 1954 and enjoyed the joke that he had only married her to get her job since he had been four years her junior at the paper.

Taking maternity leave in the years that followed only paused her writing temporarily. Roger Wood, editor of the Express, visited Baird and urged her to continue to write columns for the paper where she had established herself.

Baird continued to work as a freelance writer whilst bringing up the couple's children and it was not unknown for her to do half the researching and writing on books commissioned from her husband. Her own commissions, a history of the Women's Guild and a history of the Scottish Mutual Assurance were both well-received and she was a regular after dinner speaker for the Scottish Literary Agency.

== Personal life ==
The family moved from Garrowhill to Balmore as it grew in size with a total of five offspring: Sally, Margaret, Anna, Jon and Siggy.

Pre-deceased by husband Magnus and son Siggy, Mamie died on 12 April 2012, after suffering from dementia for eight years. She was 86 years old.

Her eldest daughter, broadcaster Sally Magnusson, has since written a memoir, Where Memories Go: Why Dementia Changes Everything.

== Legacy ==
In 1982, The Glasgow Herald columnist Jack Webster wrote of Baird:

“Her secret springs from a wonderfully observant eye... She stood in her own right as Mamie Baird, one of the finest journalists of her day.”

== Bibliography ==
- Out of Silence: The Women's Guild (1887–1987)
- A Length of Days:The Scottish Mutual Assurance Society (1883–1983)
