= Helicopter Heroes =

- Also known as: Helicopter Heroes Down Under
- Genre: Documentary; Factual
- Narrated by: Richard Hammond (2007); Rav Wilding (2008–2014); Joe Crowley (Down Under)
- Country of origin: United Kingdom
- Original language: English
- No. of series: 7 (Regular); 2 (Down Under)
- No. of episodes: 140 (Regular); 25 (Down Under)

Production
- Executive producers: Carla-Maria Lawson; Ian Cundall
- Producers: Andy Joynson; Matt Richards\
- Production locations: Yorkshire, England, UK
- Editor: Ian Cundall
- Running time: 30–45 mins

Original release
- Network: BBC One
- Release: 3 September 2007 – July 2015

Related
- Sky Cops (2006–08)

Helicopter Heroes is a British daytime television series, following the lifesaving work of the Yorkshire Air Ambulance. The first episode aired on 3 September 2007, and a total of seven series have been made. The programme ceased production in 2015.

In 2012–13 the team produced a ten-part series called Helicopter Heroes Down Under, featuring the work of British medics working in Australia.

== History ==
First screened on BBC One in 2007, its first presenter was Richard Hammond. He agreed to front the show to thank the Yorkshire Air Ambulance crew which flew him to hospital in after his near-fatal jet engine powered car crash, while filming for Top Gear, at Elvington airfield near York, in September 2006.

Audience appreciation ratings (AIs) led the BBC to re-commission the show. Several series have been repeated in a primetime slot in slightly shortened form (30 minutes).

Since series two (2008), it has been fronted by ex-policeman and former Crimewatch presenter Rav Wilding. Series six was broadcast in Autumn 2012, with a further ten episodes airing in May 2013.

The first series of Helicopter Heroes Down Under first aired in April 2013 on BBC Two, narrated by Joe Crowley. This was then repeated on BBC One and led to a second series being commissioned, which then aired in January 2015.

== Filming ==
Helicopter Heroes is edited in a hangar at Leeds Bradford Airport and shot by a small team from BBC English Regions using Sony EX3 and PMW200 HD cameras. The team also uses a collection of GoPro cameras both as 'Medicams' (body-mounted cameras on the paramedics) and five cameras located within the helicopter for stationary shots. The show also features air-to-air footage and aerial pictures of the Yorkshire countryside. They have flown more than 2,000 missions in the Yorkshire Air Ambulance's two MD900 Explorer helicopters.

The programme captured footage of the aftermath of the Cumbria shootings during summer 2010. The team also filmed footage of a patient – air ambulance dispatcher Chris Solomons – actually suffering a heart attack, going into cardiac arrest and being revived with CPR and a defibrillator. This is now used as a training aid for police, firefighters, air ambulance crews and paramedics.

The Helicopter Heroes Down Under series was filmed in Australia during early 2013.

== Transmissions ==
=== Regular series ===
Series	Start date	End date	Episodes
1	3 September 2007	14 September 2007	10
2	25 August 2008	19 September 2008	20
3	5 October 2009	30 October 2009	20
4	6 September 2010	1 October 2010	20
5	12 September 2011	7 October 2011	20
6	1 October 2012	31 May 2013	30
7	9 December 2013	25 April 2014	20

=== Down Under ===
Series	Start date	End date	Episodes
1	1 April 2013	16 April 2013	10
2	19 January 2015	2 February 2015	15

== International broadcasts ==
Helicopter Heroes has aired in Australia (series 1–2 on LifeStyle Channel), New Zealand and Scandinavia.

== See also ==
- Sky Cops – BBC TV series about British Police Air Support Units
