= British Academy Television Award for Best Daytime =

Annual UK television award

British Academy Television Award
- Country: United Kingdom
- Presented by: British Academy of Film and Television Arts
- First award: 2021
- Currently held by: Scam Interceptors (2026)
- Website: http://www.bafta.org/

The British Academy Television Award for Best Daytime is one of the major categories of the British Academy Television Awards (BAFTAs), the primary awards ceremony of the British television industry. The category was introduced in 2021.

According to the BAFTA website, the category is for "programmes largely characterised by their high volume, long running or returnable nature, delivering consistent quality over a long run with restricted budget.", including "weekend programming, live format programming, drama and game based feature shows."

== Winners and nominees ==
=== 2020s ===
Year	Title	Recipient(s)	Broadcaster
2021	The Great House Giveaway		Channel 4
2021	The Chase	Michael Kelpie, Martin Scott, Helen Tumbridge	ITV
2021	Jimmy McGovern's Moving On		BBC One
2021	Richard Osman's House of Games		BBC Two
2022	The Chase	Michael Kelpie, Martin Scott, Helen Tumbridge, Hester Davies, Christina Clayton, Mick Thomas	ITV
2022	Moneybags	David Flynn, Michelle Woods, Aaron Rosenthal, Louisa Benger, Shaun Parry, Mike Maclaine	Channel 4
2022	Steph's Packed Lunch	Ben Wicks, Rebecca Papworth, Vivek Sharma, Steph McGovern, Alan Clayton, Derek Hallworth	Channel 4
2022	Richard Osman's House of Games	Tamara Gilder, Breid McLoone, Tom Banks, Abby Brakewell, John Smith, Sarah Boyce	BBC Two
2023	The Repair Shop: A Royal Visit		BBC One
2023	The Chase	Michael Kelpie, Martin Scott, Helen Tumbridge, Caroline Sale, John L. Spencer, Hester Davies	ITV
2023	Scam Interceptors		BBC One
2024	Scam Interceptors		BBC One
2024	Loose Women and Men		ITV
2024	Lorraine		ITV
2024	Make It a Market	Martin Connery, Aman Mistry, Iain Robson, Kim Merrick, Lauren Elliott, Andrew Snowball	BBC One
2025	Clive Myrie's Caribbean Adventure	Des Henderson, Emma Parkins, Ed Stobart, Jane Magowan, Denis Minihan	BBC Two
2025	Loose Women		ITV1
2025	Richard Osman's House of Games	Tamara Gilder, Breid McLoone, John Smith, Anna Blakemore, Abby Brakewell, Tom Banks	BBC Two
2025	Morning Live		BBC One
2026	Scam Interceptors		BBC One
2026	The Chase	Martin Scott, Helen Tumbridge, Caroline Sale, John L Spencer, Mick Thomas, Michael Kelpie	ITV1
2026	Lorraine		ITV1
2026	Richard Osman's House of Games	Tamara Gilder, Breid McLoone, John Smith, Anna Blakemore, Tom Banks, Abby Brakewell	BBC Two

- Note: The series that don't have recipients on the tables had Production team credited as recipients for the award or nomination.
