= Missing (2009 TV series) =

British television crime drama series

- Genre: Crime drama
- Starring: Pauline Quirke; Mark Wingett; Felix Scott; Pooja Shah; Jamie Belman; Adjoa Andoh; Roy Hudd
- Composer: David Lowe
- Country of origin: United Kingdom
- Original language: English
- No. of series: 2
- No. of episodes: 15 (list of episodes)

Production
- Executive producers: Susie Field; Joey Attawia; James Burstall
- Producer: Julie Press
- Production locations: Kent, England
- Editor: Dominic Strevens
- Running time: 45 minutes
- Production company: Leopard Films

Original release
- Network: BBC One; BBC HD (2010)
- Release: 16 March 2009 – 26 March 2010

Related
- Missing Live

Missing is a British daytime television crime drama series starring Pauline Quirke and Mark Wingett. The series is set in a busy, under-resourced missing-persons unit, and follows the team led by DS Mary Jane "MJ" Croft (Quirke). The first series of five episodes aired on BBC One in 2009, with an extended second series of 10 episodes airing in 2010. It was filmed in and around Dover, and Tonbridge. The series also starred Felix Scott and Pooja Shah as Croft's sidekicks, Jason Doyle and Amy Garnett. Guest stars who appeared throughout the series run include Paul Nicholas, Brooke Kinsella, Gary Lucy, and Sylvia Syms.

It was the first British daytime regular series to be broadcast on the BBC since Doctors in 2000, after Channel 5 brought the rights to Neighbours in 2008 and Missing, was shown on Neighbours former 14:15 slot and since Missing was first broadcast, Moving On, Land Girls, The Indian Doctor, Justice, 32 Brinkburn Street, The Case, Secrets and Words, Nick Nickleby (as a mini-series), Privates, Father Brown, WPC 56, The Coroner, The Moonstone (as a mini-series), Shakespeare & Hathaway: Private Investigators and The Mallorca Files have been commissioned by BBC Daytime, including Pitching In, London Kills, Hope Street and Sister Boniface Mysteries which have both been broadcast on BBC One Wales, Acorn TV, BBC One Northern Ireland and BritBox respectively before being broadcast on BBC One. Father Brown, Shakespeare & Hathaway: Private Investigators and Hope Street are current BBC Daytime Productions all have been shown after Doctors.

== Production ==
The first series was commissioned in July 2008 to be broadcast in the daytime schedule, alongside a new series Missing Live, which follows the work of the police and a missing-persons charity searching for people who go missing. A second series was commissioned in October 2009. BBC daytime controller Liam Keelan commented: "We have seen how successful combining drama and factual programming has been in BBC Daytime - extending the run of Missing will create an even greater sense of event."

== Main cast ==
- Pauline Quirke as DS Mary Jane 'MJ' Croft – head of Dover's Missing Persons Unit
- Mark Wingett as Danny Hayworth – former crime journalist, now a radio DJ for Dover Radio; friend of DS Croft
- Felix Scott as DC Jason Doyle – MPU Detective; former member of the vice squad who is currently pursuing his sergeant's exams
- Pooja Shah as Amy Garnett – MPU Civilian Technical Assistant
- Jamie Belman as DC Josh Kemplin - former member of the Flying Squad who joins the team in series two
- Adjoa Andoh as DCI Lauren Ford - head of CID
- Roy Hudd as Jack Croft - MJ and Ellen's estranged father
- Helen Baker as Ellen Croft - MJ Croft's sister, who was thought to be dead

== Episode list ==
=== Series 1 (2009) ===
No. overall	No. in series	Title	Directed by	Written by	Original release date	Viewers (millions)
1	1	"Flip the Coin"	Laurence Wilson	Roy Boulter	16 March 2009	N/A
MJ and her newly-assembled team are assigned two separate investigations: the disappearance of a young Autistic boy's mother, and a man who appears to have stolen a large sum of money from his fiancé and subsequently fled. Meanwhile, MJ agrees to appear on the radio to highlight the work of her team and plea for information relating to both cases.
2	2	"Young and Restless"	Jenny Ash	Matthew Leys	17 March 2009	N/A
MJ and Jason investigate the disappearance of a young girl following a night out with friends, but suspect that her own father may have something to do with her disappearance. Meanwhile, Amy re-opens the investigation into the disappearance of MJ's sister, which brings further heartbreak when MJ discovers that she is still alive.
3	3	"Repeat Offender"	Jenny Ash	Karen McLachlan	18 March 2009	N/A
Jason is assaulted by an irate husband whose wife has disappeared, but after DCI Ford intervenes and arrests the man on suspicion of murder, MJ discovers that the missing wife is a "serial missing person", having disappeared several times before. Meanwhile, Amy investigates the disappearance of a witness in a criminal trial.
4	4	"Gone But Not Forgotten"	Laurence Wilson	Matthew Leys	19 March 2009	N/A
MJ investigates the disappearance of a lawyer, who appears to have simply vanished whilst playing the park with his young daughter. Meanwhile, a young woman approaches the team for help in finding her abusive father, who she hasn't seen since she was sixteen. Amy stumbles across a phone number registered to MJ's long-lost sister.
5	5	"Deeper Problems"	Jill Robertson	Ann Marie Di Mambro	20 March 2009	N/A
Businessman Sam Wise disappears in mysterious circumstances, and MJ's investigation leads her to believe that his financial problems may have been a factor in his disappearance. As Amy interviews a possible witness, she finds herself in unexpected danger. Meanwhile, MJ finally comes face to face with her sister at the local hospital.

=== Series 2 (2010) ===
No. overall	No. in series	Title	Directed by	Written by	Original release date	Viewers (millions)
6	1	"A New Beginning"	Laurence Wilson	Matthew Leys	15 March 2010	N/A
MJ finds herself stonewalled by DCI Ford whilst trying to investigate the disappearance of a six-year-old girl who appears to have been abducted by her biological father. Meanwhile, Amy tries to re-unite a father and son who have drifted apart after the boy came out as gay, while MJ is forced to deal with the re-appearance of her father.
7	2	"The Old Romantic"	Laurence Wilson	Karen McLachlan	16 March 2010	N/A
MJ investigates the disappearance of teenager Jess Stratton, who she fears may have been abducted by a violent psychopath whom she encountered during her time in foster care. Meanwhile, Danny tries his hand at re-uniting a man with his long lost lover, but the case takes an awkward turn. MJ's father offers her an olive branch.
8	3	"Two of the Same"	Jill Robertson	Martin Jameson	17 March 2010	N/A
The disappearance of two otherwise unconnected victims becomes increasingly complicated when a car crash reveals that they are in fact the same man, who has been using different aliases to life a double life. Meanwhile, MJ becomes irate with Amy after she lodges a complaint with DCI Ford regarding her father's necklace, which turns out to be stolen.
9	4	"Hostile"	Jill Robertson	Mark Clompus	18 March 2010	N/A
An ex-corporal reports the disappearance of his young lodger, but when MJ manages to track him down, she realises that the situation is not as clear cut as she first thought. Meanwhile, a training coach reports one of his promising young athletes as missing, but fails to add that they have been having a sexual relationship.
10	5	"Married Acquaintance"	Sean Glynn	Roy Boulter	19 March 2010	N/A
A motorcycle courier is forced to go into hiding after rumbling a dangerous gang of violent counterfeiters, but MJ discovers he may have a more pressing reason to disappear. Meanwhile, Jason feels used when an old schoolmate asks him to track down a former girlfriend, who turns out to be a woman he has become increasingly besotted with.
11	6	"Unselfish Reasons"	Sean Glynn	Martin Jameson	22 March 2010	N/A
The disappearance of a nervous fiancé soon becomes a race against time when MJ discovers that he has taken several bottles of sleeping pills with him. Meanwhile, Amy begins the search for a missing husband, only to receive the shock of her life when his real identity finally comes to light.
12	7	"One for Sorrow"	Stewart Svaasand	Mark Cairns	23 March 2010	N/A
The case of a teenage nanny who has disappeared without trace soon becomes penetrable when her therapist reveals that she let slip that the girl was adopted shortly after birth. Amy offers to help ex-policewoman Beth Murphy, whose best friend Polly has vanished - but she discovers that Polly is long since dead and that Beth may just be looking for company.
13	8	"Proving the Point"	Stewart Svaasand	Chris Murray	24 March 2010	N/A
MJ takes an instant dislike to a former flying squad detective who joins her team, but is impressed when he manages to track down a missing teenage music prodigy who disappeared whilst fishing with his father. Meanwhile, Amy tries to play cupid for a businessman whose P.A. is not returning his calls, but unwittingly finds some romance of her own.
14	9	"Control"	Laurence Wilson	Debbie O'Malley	25 March 2010	N/A
On advice from Josh, Jason pressures MJ into taking the lead on the disappearance of a teacher from the local grammar school, who had recently been accused of having an inappropriate relationship with a pupil. However, Jason soon realises that the young girl in question may have a different agenda, and may hold the key to where the teacher might be.
15	10	"Ghosts"	Laurence Wilson	Hilary Frankland	26 March 2010	N/A
MJ offers to help a young mother after she claims to have seen her daughter, who disappeared eight years earlier, aged five, playing on the local beach. As the search gets underway, Josh threatens to jeopardise the investigation by ordering a DNA test on the girl behind MJ's back, a decision which leads him to contemplate his future within the unit.
