= Rav Wilding =

British television personality and former police officer (born 1977)

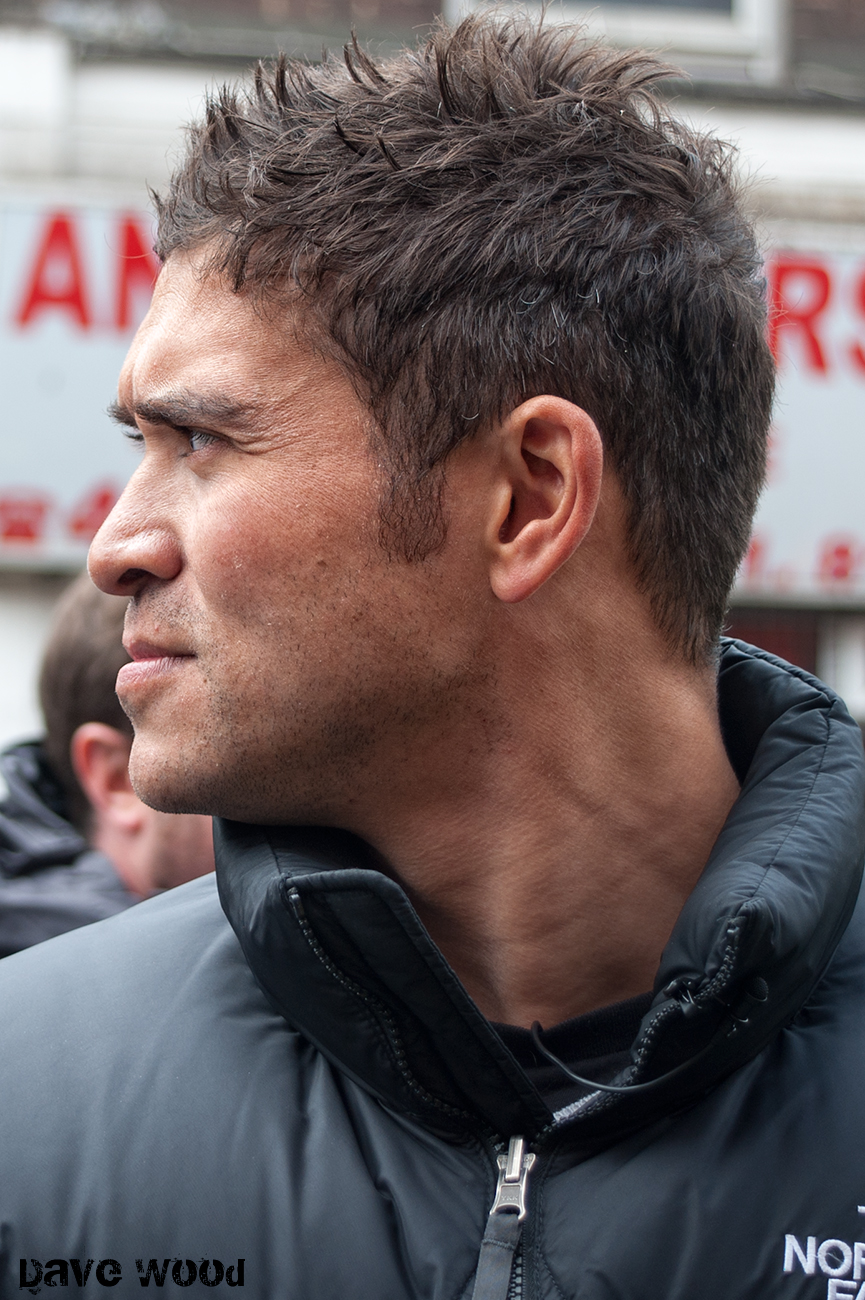
- Wilding in 2012
- Born: Ravin Mika Wilding; 16 October 1977 (age 48); Canterbury, Kent, England
- Education: Fulston Manor School
- Occupations: Soldier, security guard, police officer, television presenter
- Known for: Crimewatch (2004–2011); Crimewatch Live (2009–present); Strictly Come Dancing (2009); Scam Interceptors (2022–present); Helicopter Heroes (2008–2014); Frontline Fightback (2021–present)
- Spouse: Jill Morgan (m. 2017 sep. 2024)
- Partner(s): Chantelle Houghton (2010–2011); Rebecca Mason (2024–)

Ravin Mika Wilding (born 16 October 1977) is a British television presenter and former police officer who served with the British Transport Police and Metropolitan Police Service.

Prior to joining the police, Wilding served in the British Army and worked as a security guard at Harrods department store in London. He is best known for his roles as a presenter on the BBC TV crime shows Crimewatch and Crimewatch Live.

== Military and police career ==
In January 2021, it was announced by Chief Superintendent Martin Fry that Wilding had joined British Transport Police as a detective. However, according to his LinkedIn profile, Wilding ended his service with the British Transport Police in March 2021.

== Television career ==
In 2002, Wilding participated in the Channel 4 reality television series Eden. Wilding had to go through numerous interviews and auditions as well as formal television presenter training. Having also auditioned for Blue Peter, he was offered a part on BBC Crimewatch, which he has appeared on since June 2004. After taking a period of unpaid leave, Wilding resigned from the police force in February 2008 to concentrate on TV work.

Wilding is a regular reporter on crime issues for BBC One's The One Show. Since 21 April 2008, Wilding has co-presented a new programme called Missing Live, shown every weekday morning on BBC One. In August 2008, he hosted the twenty-episode fly-on-the-wall series following the lives of the Yorkshire Air Ambulance, Helicopter Heroes on BBC One. He has also fronted two series of the daily live show Crimewatch Roadshow for BBC One and presented the third series in June 2011.

In January 2008, he won a celebrity edition of The Weakest Link and Ready Steady Cook. On 29 December 2008, Wilding appeared on Celebrity Mastermind. His specialist subject was "The Human Body". He came last with only fifteen points.

In August 2009, Wilding was revealed as one of the contestants in Strictly Come Dancing and was partnered with Aliona Vilani. Wilding was made fourth favourite by bookmakers behind former boxer Joe Calzaghe and actor Ricky Whittle; however, he became the third celebrity to be eliminated on the show after failing to be saved in the dance-off, on 3 October 2009.

In September 2010, Wilding went to the front line of British military operations in Afghanistan filming a series for BBC called Remembrance Week. While filming, he witnessed a bomb blast that killed one of the serving soldiers with the unit he was filming, the 2nd Battalion, the Duke of Lancaster's Regiment. The series focused on both past and present conflicts.

On 15 December 2011, Kirsty Young, Wilding's Crimewatch co-host, announced that this would be his last show. Since June 2009, Wilding has presented the accompanying series, Crimewatch Live, on BBC1 with his co-presenter Michelle Ackerley.

He took part in an episode of Tipping Point: Lucky Stars on ITV, in which he set the record for the most counters dropped in a single go in any episode of Tipping Point, sinking 23 counters (for a total of £2,300).

He appeared on Season 5 on Hacker Time.

Since 2022, Wilding has presented the BBC programme series Scam Interceptors about internet fraud, alongside Nick Stapleton and featuring ethical hacker Jim Browning.

== Personal life ==
Wilding was born to an Indo-Mauritian father and an English mother. Both parents worked as nurses for the NHS.

Wilding was previously in a relationship with English television personality and glamour model Chantelle Houghton. The couple separated in 2011, following a public break-up via a Tweet. Wilding began a relationship with Loose Women's producer Jill Morgan in 2012. The couple married in 2017, and had a daughter in 2020. By early 2024, they had separated.

Later during 2024, Wilding was in a relationship with television co-presenter and former police officer Rebecca Mason.

Wilding revealed on Morning Live that he is dyslexic and dyspraxic, and that he had also received a diagnosis of autism by Simon Baron-Cohen in a film broadcast on the subject.

== Filmography ==
TV

- Eden (2002) – Participant
- Crimewatch (2004–2011) – Presenter
- Missing Live (2008–2010) – Co-presenter
- Helicopter Heroes (2008–2014) – Presenter
- Strictly Come Dancing (2009) – Participant
- Crimewatch Roadshow (2009–present) – Presenter
- Remembrance Week (2010) – Presenter
- 71 Degrees North (2011) – Participant
- Cop School (2011) – Presenter
- Neighbourhood Blues (2011) – Presenter
- Frontline Police (2012) – Presenter
- Hero Squad (2012–2013) – Presenter
- Crime Scene Rescue (2013) – Presenter
- Splash! (2013) – Participant
- British Police Murdered on Duty (2016) – Narrator
- Ill Gotten Gains (2016) – Co-presenter
- Christmas City (2016) – Presenter
- The All New Monty - Who Bares Wins (2019) – Participant
- Richard Osman's House of Games (2020) – Participant
- Frontline Fightback (2021–2023) – Narrator
- Morning Live presenter/expert
- Scam Interceptors (2022–present) – presenter
- Car Crime: How Safe Is Your Car? (2022) – Presenter
