= Magnus Magnusson =

Icelandic-born journalist (1929–2007)

Magnus Magnusson KBE
- Born: Magnús Sigursteinsson; 12 October 1929; Reykjavík, Iceland
- Died: 7 January 2007 (aged 77); Balmore, Dunbartonshire, Scotland
- Education: Jesus College, Oxford
- Occupations: Television presenter; journalist; translator; writer
- Years active: 1962-2007
- Known for: Mastermind presenter, translation work
- Spouse: Mamie Baird (m. 1954)
- Children: 5, including Sally and Jon
- Relatives: Jamie Magnus Stone (grandson)

Magnus Magnusson (born Magnús Sigursteinsson; 12 October 1929 – 7 January 2007) was an Icelandic-born Scottish journalist, translator, writer and television presenter. Born in Reykjavík, he lived in Scotland for almost all his life, although he never took British citizenship. He came to prominence as a BBC television journalist and was the presenter of the BBC television quiz programme Mastermind for 25 years.

== Early life ==
Magnús Sigursteinsson was born in Reykjavík on 12 October 1929. When he was nine months old he moved to Edinburgh, following the appointment of his father, Sigursteinn Magnússon, as European manager of the Icelandic Co-op. In Scotland his family adopted a British naming convention, and from childhood Magnus used his father's patronymic as a surname.

Magnusson lived with his family in John Street, Portobello, in Edinburgh's east. He was educated at the Edinburgh Academy, where he was in the school's marching brass band, and at Jesus College, Oxford.

== Career ==
=== Journalism and television ===
After graduating from Oxford Magnusson became a reporter with the Scottish Daily Express and The Scotsman. Between 1962 and 1964 he edited the Saltire Society's magazine New Saltire. He went freelance in 1967, then joined the BBC. In 1968 he appeared as a storyteller in five episodes of the BBC children's programme Jackanory, narrating English translations of 'Stories from Iceland'. He presented programmes on history and archaeology including Chronicle and BC The Archaeology of the Bible Lands, and appeared in news programmes. In later years Magnusson wrote for the New Statesman.

==== Mastermind ====
Magnusson presented the long-running quiz show Mastermind from 1972 to 1997 on BBC1. His catchphrase "I've started, so I'll finish", which his successors continued to use, was said whenever the time for questioning a contestant ran out while he was reading a question on the show. Magnusson made cameo appearances as himself, hosting Mastermind in Morecambe and Wise as well as the children's series Dizzy Heights and as Magnus Magnesium in The Goodies episode "Frankenfido". He also used his Mastermind catchphrase in a television advertisement for cheese.

Magnusson ended his 25-year run hosting Mastermind in September 1997, and the original black chair was given to him at the end of the production, passing to his daughter Sally Magnusson after his death.

Magnusson later returned to present a one-off celebrity special, originally broadcast on 30 December 2002 on BBC Two, to celebrate the 30th anniversary of the first ever Mastermind final. This was a precursor to the main show returning to the BBC with Humphrys as host. Shortly before his death, Magnusson returned to the regular Mastermind series to present the trophy to the 2006 champion Geoff Thomas. Sally Magnusson presented the trophy to the next series winner, David Clark, while also paying tribute to her father and his legacy to the show.

=== Scottish Natural Heritage ===
Magnusson was appointed Chair of the environmental agency Scottish Natural Heritage from its establishment in 1991 by the Secretary of State for Scotland, Ian Lang, and served in that role until 21 March 1999. In 1992 and 1993 he chaired the Cairngorms Working Party. From September 1994 he chaired the Paths for All Partnership.

=== Books ===
- Scotland: The Story of a Nation
- Introducing Archaeology
- Viking Expansion Westwards
- The Clacken and the Slate (The Edinburgh Academy, 1824 – 1974)
- Viking Hammer of the North
- BC: The Archaeology of the Bible Lands
- Landlord or Tenant?: A View of Irish History
- Iceland
- Vikings!
- Magnus on the Move
- Treasures of Scotland
- Lindisfarne: The Cradle Island
- Reader's Digest Book of Facts (ed.)
- Iceland Saga
- Chambers Biographical Dictionary (ed., 5th edition)
- The Nature of Scotland (ed.)
- I've Started, So I'll Finish
- Rum: Nature's Island
- Magnus Magnusson's Quiz Book
- Fakers, Forgers and Phoneys: Famous Scams and Scamps

=== Translator ===
Magnusson translated or co-translated a variety of books from modern Icelandic and Old Norse into English. Among these are several works by Halldór Laxness, the Nobel Prize-winning novelist from Iceland, as well as a number of Norse sagas, which he co-translated (with Hermann Pálsson) for Penguin Classics: Njal's Saga (1960), The Vinland Sagas (1965), King Harald's Saga (1966) and Laxdæla Saga (1969).

== Awards and charity positions ==
Magnusson was given the honorary award of Knight Commander of the Order of the British Empire in 1989.

He was elected President of the Royal Society for the Protection of Birds at its 94th annual general meeting in October 1995, succeeding Max Nicholson, and held the office until 2000. He was founder chairman of the Scottish Churches Architectural Heritage Trust in 1978 (it became Scotland's Churches Trust in 2012).

He was Lord Rector of Edinburgh University from 1975 to 1978 and in 2002 he became Chancellor of Glasgow Caledonian University. The Magnus Magnusson Fellowship, an intellectual group based at the Glasgow Caledonian University, was named in his honour.

== Death ==
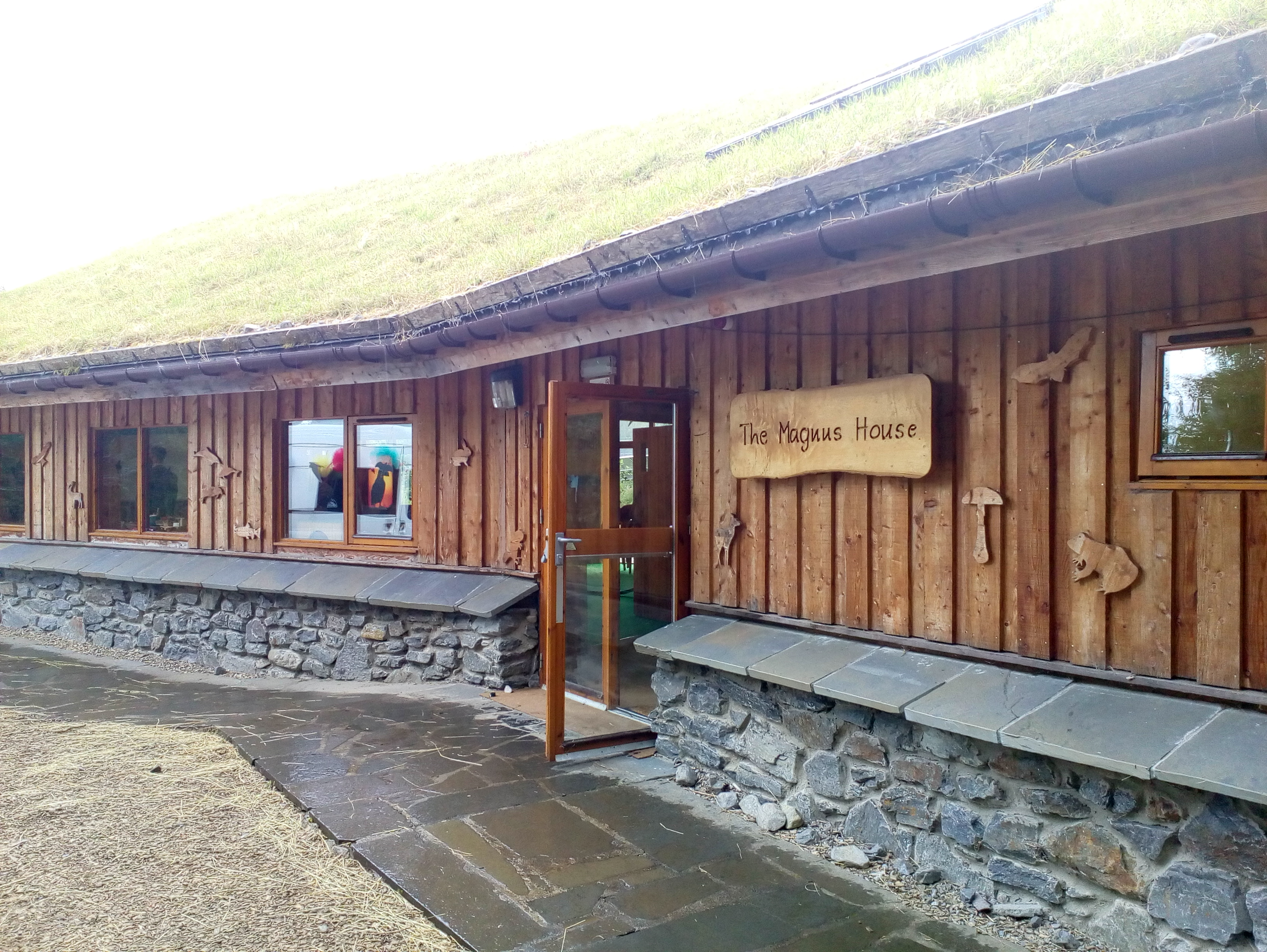
Magnus House near Aigas

On 12 October 2006, his 77th birthday, Magnusson was diagnosed with pancreatic cancer. His condition forced him to cancel a string of public appearances. He died on 7 January 2007. The Aigas Field Centre has a building named the Magnus House in his honour.

== Family ==
Magnusson was married to Mamie Baird from 1954 until his death. They had five children. Their eldest son, Sigursteinn "Siggy", died in a traffic accident in 1973, when he was struck by a vehicle close to the Glasgow Academy playing fields at Anniesland in the city's West End. Their daughter Sally is a journalist, writer and television presenter, and youngest son Jon is a television producer, writer and director.

== Bibliography ==
- Viking Expansion Westwards (1973), ISBN 978-0-8098-3529-4
- The Clacken and the Slate (1974), ISBN 0-00-411170-2
- Viking, Hammer of the North (1976), ISBN 978-0-399-11744-2
- BC The Archaeology of the Bible Lands (1977), ISBN 978-0-671-24010-3
- The Vikings (1980, revised 2000), ISBN 978-0-7524-2699-0
- Lindisfarne, The Cradle Island (1984), ISBN 0-85362-223-X
- Chambers Biographical Dictionary (1990), as General Editor, ISBN 0-550-16040 X Hardback
- Scotland Since Prehistory: Natural Change and Human Impact (1993), ISBN 978-1-898218-03-6
- I've Started So I'll Finish (1998), ISBN 978-0-7515-2585-4
- Scotland: The Story of a Nation (2000), ISBN 978-0-00-653191-3
- Lindisfarne (2004), ISBN 978-0-7524-3227-4
- Iceland Saga (2005), ISBN 978-0-7524-3342-4
- Keeping Your Words: An Anthology of Quotations (2005), ISBN 978-0-340-86264-3
- Fakers, Forgers and Phoneys: Famous Scams and Scamps (2006), ISBN 978-1-84596-190-9

Academic offices
Preceded by Gordon Brown	Rector of the University of Edinburgh; 1976–1979	Succeeded by Anthony Ross
Preceded by David Nickson	Chancellor of Glasgow Caledonian University; 2002–2007	Succeeded by Gus Macdonald
Media offices
New creation	Host of Mastermind; 1972–1997	Succeeded by Peter Snow
