= Sunday Life (TV series) =

2008 British TV series

- Presented by: Louise Minchin; Colin Jackson
- Country of origin: United Kingdom
- Original language: English
- No. of series: 1
- No. of episodes: 24

Production
- Production company: True North Productions

Original release
- Network: BBC One
- Release: 20 April – 26 October 2008

Sunday Life is a British magazine television programme that was broadcast on Sundays on BBC One, beginning on 20 April 2008, presented by Louise Minchin and Colin Jackson. The show, which replaced The Heaven and Earth Show, was intended to focus on "inspiring stories and thought-provoking discussion", with the slogan "Real stories. Real people. Real life." The show was partly intended to fill the public service remit of the BBC's broadcasting licence, as well as its Sunday morning religious quota. It was dropped from the schedule after one series and its slot in the schedule replaced by The Big Questions.

The show was produced by True North Productions, which is based in Leeds. The location for the show was in Keighley, West Yorkshire, at the old Mills, which were renovated.
