= Sally Magnusson =

Scottish broadcaster and writer (born 1955)

Sally Magnusson MBE FRSE
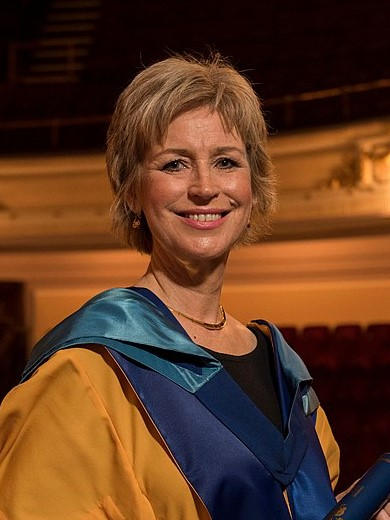
- Magnusson being granted an honorary degree by The Open University in 2016
- Born: Sally Anne Magnusson; 11 October 1955 (age 71); Bellshill, Lanarkshire, Scotland
- Education: Laurel Bank School for Girls; University of Edinburgh
- Occupations: Broadcaster, writer
- Spouse: Norman Stone (m. 1984)
- Children: 5, including Jamie Magnus Stone
- Parents: Magnus Magnusson (father); Mamie Baird (mother)
- Relatives: Jon Magnusson (brother); Archie Baird (uncle)
- Website: sallymagnusson.com

Sally Anne Stone MBE FRSE (née Magnusson; born 11 October 1955), known professionally as Sally Magnusson, is a Scottish broadcast journalist, television presenter and writer, who presented the Thursday and Friday night edition of BBC Scotland's Reporting Scotland. She also presents Tracing Your Roots on BBC Radio 4 and was one of the main presenters of the long-running religious television programme Songs of Praise.

== Early life ==
Magnusson was born in 1955 at Bellshill Maternity Hospital in Bellshill, North Lanarkshire. She is the eldest daughter of Magnus Magnusson, an Icelandic-born broadcaster and writer, and Mamie Baird, a newspaper journalist from Rutherglen. Her maternal uncle, Archie Baird, was a Scottish footballer, who played for Aberdeen and St Johnstone. Magnusson's paternal grandfather, Sigursteinn Magnusson, opened an office to handle fish exports to Europe in Edinburgh.

She spent her early years in Garrowhill in Glasgow, before moving to Rutherglen, where she grew up with her younger siblings Margaret, Anna, Sigursteinn "Siggy" and Jon. The family later moved to the rural area of Balmore, just north of Glasgow. In May 1973, Magnusson's brother, Siggy, died aged 12 three days after being hit by a lorry.

== Education ==
Magnusson was educated at Laurel Bank School for Girls, a former independent school which later merged with another independent school, The Park School, to form Laurel Park School, itself to merge in 2001 into Hutchesons' Grammar School, in the city of Glasgow. She studied English Language and Literature at the University of Edinburgh. She graduated in 1978 with a first-class honours degree.

== Career ==
Magnusson started her career in journalism at The Scotsman newspaper in Edinburgh in 1979 and then the Sunday Standard in Glasgow as a news/feature writer. In 1982, she became Scottish Feature Writer of the Year. She later joined BBC Scotland to present the weekly TV show Current Account. Magnusson moved to London to present Sixty Minutes, the BBC's successor to Nationwide, for network television. Following the show's demise, she presented BBC London Plus for a year.

In October 1986, Magnusson joined BBC One's Breakfast Time as one of the main presenters. In 1987 she was part of the Breakfast Time team, including Frank Bough, Jeremy Paxman and Peter Snow, which covered the results of the general election. From 1989 onwards, she co-presented the programme's replacement, Breakfast News, initially with Laurie Mayer, and in later years, with Justin Webb.

In 1996, she won a Scottish Bafta for her commentary on the BBC's Dunblane: A Community Remembers, and in 1998 was awarded a Royal Television Society award for her exclusive television interview with Earl Spencer, Diana: My Sister the Princess. Magnusson narrated the Q.E.D. documentary Saving Trudy in 1999.

As a reporter, she covered the 1997, 2001 and 2005 General Elections, as well as the funeral of Diana, Princess of Wales and the opening of the new Scottish Parliament. She also commentated for the BBC on the funerals of the inaugural First Minister of Scotland Donald Dewar, Cardinal Basil Hume and Cardinal Thomas Winning. Magnusson has presented many television programmes, ranging from Panorama to Songs of Praise. In 2005 she joined BBC Two's The Daily Politics as its Friday presenter.

In 1997, Magnusson returned to Glasgow and became a main presenter for BBC Scotland's news programme Reporting Scotland. She shared the role with Jackie Bird and then with Laura Miller and presented the programme's Thursday and Friday edition. In January 2025 it was announced that Magnusson would leave after 27 years. Magnusson’s last programme was broadcast on 4 April 2025.

== Books ==
Magnusson is the author of Life of Pee: The Story of How Urine Got Everywhere. She has also written books about the Scottish runner Eric Liddell, who refused to run on Sunday due to his Christian beliefs, and about the Cornish Christian poet Jack Clemo and his marriage to Ruth Peaty.

Magnusson wrote the children's book Horace and the Haggis Hunter, which was illustrated by her husband, Norman Stone.

The Seal Woman's Gift, Magnusson's first novel for adults, was published in February 2018.

The Ninth Child, her second novel, published in 2020, is set in 19th-century Scotland, weaving folklore and Victorian social history.

== Personal life ==
Magnusson married Norman Stone, a TV director, on 9 June 1984 in Baldernock, near Milngavie, East Dunbartonshire. She is the mother of the Scottish film director Jamie Magnus Stone, and has three other sons and a daughter. She lives in the village of Torrance, East Dunbartonshire. She had previously lived in Bourne End, Buckinghamshire.

== Honours and awards ==
Magnusson has received honorary degrees from several institutions: in 2009 a Doctorate of Letters from Glasgow Caledonian University, in 2015 an honorary degree from the University of Stirling and from The Open University on 29 October 2016. In 2007 the Institute of Contemporary Scotland awarded her a place in the Scottish Academy of Merit for services to the media.

Magnusson was appointed Member of the Order of the British Empire (MBE) in the 2023 Birthday Honours for services to people with dementia and their carers. She was elected a Fellow of the Royal Society of Edinburgh in 2024.

== Bibliography ==
- The Flying Scotsman: The Eric Liddell Story. 1981. ISBN 978-0704333796.
- Clemo, A Love Story. 1986. ISBN 978-0745912301.
- A Shout in the Street: The Story of Church House in Bridgeton. 1991. ISBN 978-0861531509.
- Family Life. 1999. ISBN 978-0002570633.
- Glorious Things: My Hymns for Life. 2004. ISBN 9780826476678.
- Dreaming of Iceland: The Lure of a Family Legend. 2004. ISBN 978-0340862506.
- Dreaming of Iceland: The Lure of a Family Legend. 2005. ISBN 978-0340862506.
- Life of Pee: The Story of How Urine Got Everywhere. 2010. ISBN 978-1845135904.
- Horace and the Haggis Hunter. 2012. ISBN 978-1845024369.
- Horace the Haggis and the Ghost Dog. 2013. ISBN 978-1845026387.
- Where Memories Go: Why Dementia Changes Everything. 2014. ISBN 978-1444751789.
- The Sealwoman's Gift. 2018. ISBN 978-1473638952.
- The Ninth Child. 2020. ISBN 978-1473696600.
- Music in the Dark. 2023. ISBN 978-1529345933.
- The Shapeshifter's Daughter. 2025. ISBN 978-1399825207.
