= Anja Steinbauer =

Anja Steinbauer is a London-based Sinologist and philosopher. She was born in Mainz, Germany. She is notable as one of the pioneers of the popular philosophy movement, and is the president of Philosophy For All in London. She is also one of the editors of the popularizing magazine Philosophy Now.

Much of Steinbauer's scholarly work has related to the Chinese New Confucian philosopher Tang Junyi. This formed the basis for her PhD, which she took at Hamburg University.

For some years Steinbauer taught philosophy as part of the adult education department at Birkbeck College in London. When the courses at Birkbeck were cut as a cost-saving measure in 2010, she and six other ex-Birkbeck philosophy tutors joined together to found a new college: the London School of Philosophy (LSP). The LSP's first-ever lecture was given by Anja Steinbauer in January 2011, on the subject "Philosophy and Literature".

== Writings ==
- Tang Junyis System der neun Horizonte des Geistes, (2005), Hamburger Sinologische Gesellschaft. (ISBN 978-3935664127)
- 200 Words to Help You Talk About Philosophy, (2020), Laurence King Publishing. (ISBN 978-1786276940)
- A Philosophical Symphony: Tang Junyi's System Anja Steinbauer
- What's New in... Chinese Philosophy? Philosophy Now Issue 23, Anja Steinbauer
