= St Hilary's School =

St Hilary's School may refer to:

== England ==
- St Hilary's School, Godalming
- St Hilary's School, Sevenoaks
- St Hilary's School, Alderley Edge, a precursor of Alderley Edge School for Girls

== Scotland ==
- St Hilary's School, Edinburgh
