= Lynn Faulds Wood =

Scottish television presenter (1948–2020)

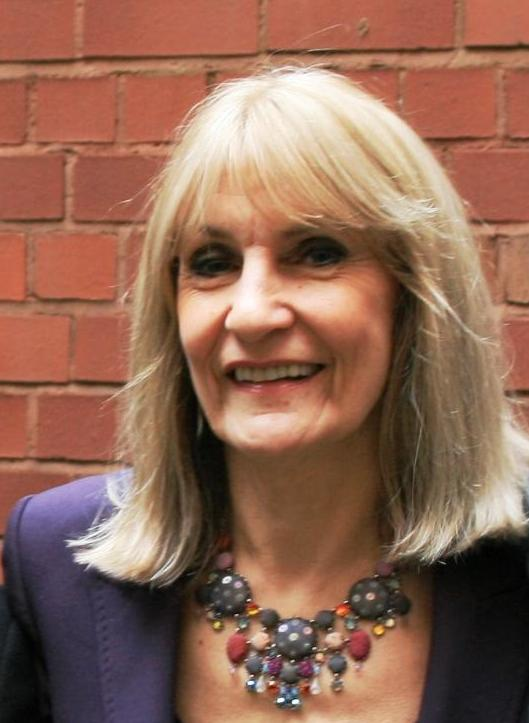
- Faulds Wood in 2010
- Born: 25 March 1948; Glasgow, Scotland
- Died: 24 April 2020 (aged 72); London, England
- Education: University of Glasgow (MA)
- Occupations: Teacher, television presenter, journalist, cancer campaigner
- Years active: 1970–2020
- Employer: BBC
- Television: TV-am; BBC Breakfast Time; Watchdog; GMTV; Watchdog: Test House
- Spouse: John Stapleton (m. 1977)
- Children: 1

Lynn Faulds Wood (25 March 1948 – 24 April 2020) was a Scottish television presenter and journalist. She co-presented the British television programme Watchdog with her husband John Stapleton.

== Early life and career ==
Faulds Wood was born on 25 March 1948 in Hillhead, Glasgow and grew up in Duck Bay on Loch Lomond side. She gained an MA in languages from Glasgow University. She moved to London at age 21, where she taught French at Holland Park School for two years.

Her early career in journalism involved periods at IPC Magazines' Woman (1977–79), the Daily Mail (1979–80) then "Lynn's Action Line" at The Sun.

When breakfast television began in the early 1980s, Faulds Wood joined TV-am as their "Consumer Champion" from 1983 to 1984 then moved to the BBC's Breakfast Time from 1984 to 1986. She is best known for turning Watchdog into a peak time BBC One series, presenting the programme from 1985 to 1993 with her husband John Stapleton.

In 1991, Faulds Wood was diagnosed with stage three bowel cancer. Five years after surgery, she was found to be clear. (She also survived skin cancer.) Meanwhile, with a programme titled "Doctor Knows Best", she contributed in 1993 to ITV's World In Action series. Faulds Wood found the symptoms for bowel cancer were different from those taught in GP training in medical schools. This edition of World In Action achieved the programmes highest audience with 10.2 million viewers. In her 1996 investigation into bowel cancer, "Bobby Moore & Me", she interviewed the widow of footballer Bobby Moore, who said he had been misdiagnosed with irritable bowel syndrome and treated for the condition instead of the bowel cancer from which he died aged 51. It had 6.5 million viewers and 28,000 letters. A series on cervical cancer in 1995, The Lady Killers, led the British Medical Association to name Faulds Wood medical broadcaster of the year. She also helped to create the world's first evidence-based guide to symptoms of her cancer, officially adopted by the Department of Health in 2000.

In 1990, Faulds Wood guest starred on an episode of French and Saunders as herself. In 1993 she was gunged on an episode of Noel Edmonds' BBC One programme Noel's House Party.

From 2003 to 2009, she was "Consumer Champion" on GMTV. In 2006, she teamed up with presenter Esther Rantzen and series producer Rob Unsworth to present the BBC consumer investigation series Old Dogs, New Tricks. In 2014, Faulds Wood returned to Watchdog, with a new daytime BBC One series, Watchdog Test House, which she co-presented with Sophie Raworth.

== Campaigning work ==
In 2002, she co-founded the European Cancer Patient Coalition, which she chaired 2003–2010. She helped to set up MEPs Against Cancer and is credited with helping to get cancer on the official European Agenda. In 2009, she was invited to present the new European cancer plan – Action Against Cancer – in Brussels.

In 2010, Faulds Wood said that she was considering entering politics by standing for the Parliament of the United Kingdom at the general election. Instead she remained as a health campaigner, still regularly appearing on television talking about cancer and consumer matters. She chaired the British Standards Institution Consumer and Public Interest Network until 2013, and served as President and Patron of many charities and health organisations, with an honorary doctorate for services to bowel cancer.

== Personal life and death ==
While working as a teacher, Faulds Wood also worked in a pub in Richmond upon Thames. As a barmaid there she first met British journalist and television presenter John Stapleton; the couple married in 1977. Faulds Wood and her husband lived in St Margarets, London. They had a son together, Nick Stapleton (born 1987), who is a documentary journalist known for being part of the team on BBC One's Scam Interceptors. In late December 2016, Faulds Wood claimed that she had declined the offer of an MBE in the New Year Honours. "I would love to have an honour if it didn't have the word 'empire' on the end of it. We don't have an empire, in my opinion," she told the Press Association. She did accept an honorary doctorate from Glasgow University of which she was already a graduate.

Faulds Wood died on 24 April 2020 at the Charing Cross Hospital in London, aged 72. A statement released by her family said she had died after a stroke. Stapleton survived her, dying in September 2025.
