= Seymour (city), Outagamie County, Wisconsin =

Seymour, Wisconsin
- City
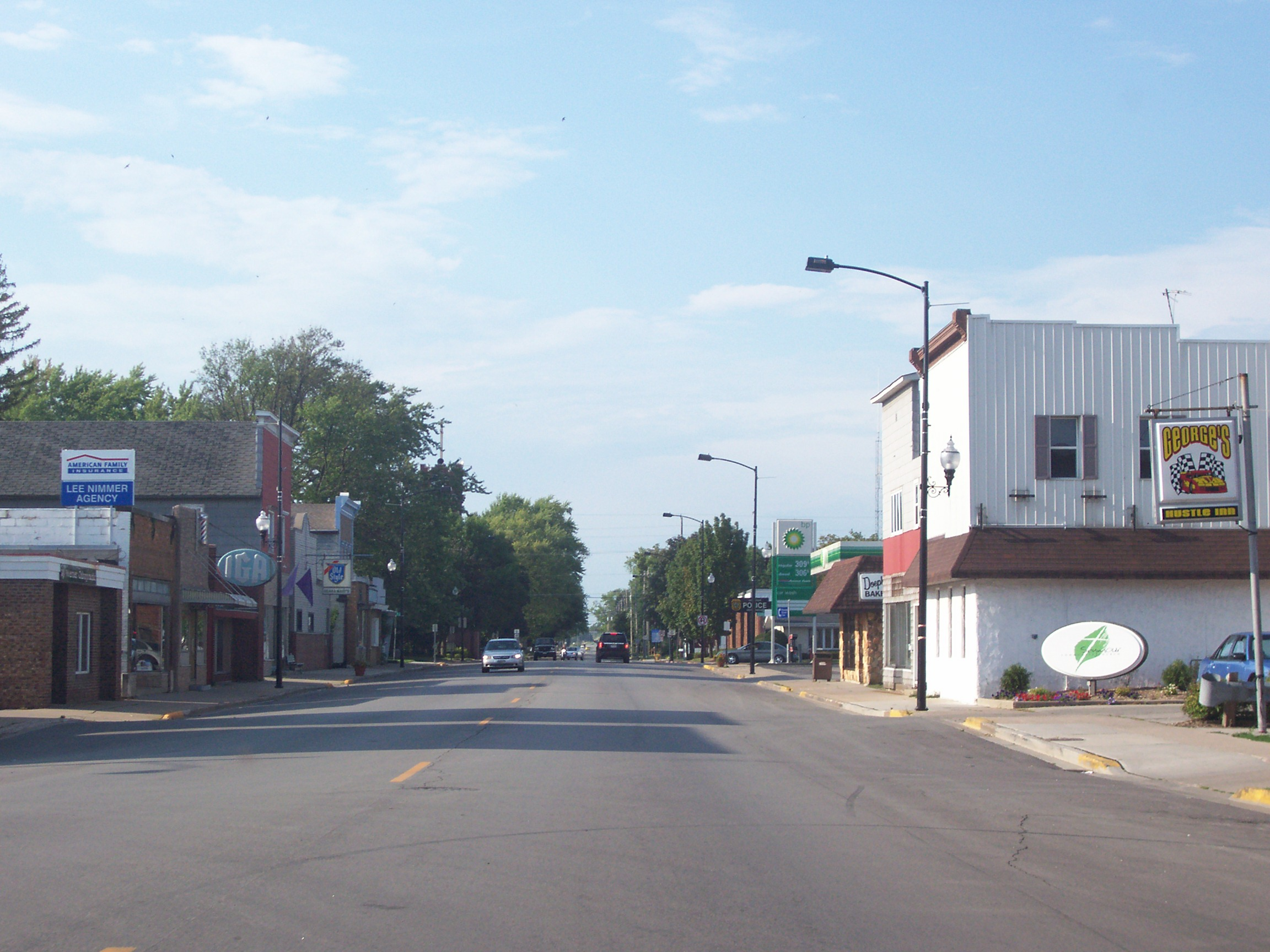
- View of Seymour along Highway 55
- Nickname: Home of the Hamburger
- Location of Seymour in Outagamie County, Wisconsin

- Location within Wisconsin Location within the United States
- Coordinates: 44°30′31″N 88°19′42″W
- Country: United States
- State: Wisconsin
- County: Outagamie
- Founded: 1868; 158 years ago
- Incorporated: 1879; 147 years ago

Government
  - Type: Mayor/city council
  - Mayor: Mary Greuel
  - Ward 1, 2, & 7 City Councilmember: Steve Hurkman & Cody VanderHeiden
  - Ward 3 & 4 Councilmember: Todd Schaumberg & Greg Gerbers
  - Wards 5 & 6 Councilmember: Pat Krull & Alex Tetzlaff
  - City and Town of Seymour Municipal Judge: Catherine Krull

Area
  - Total: 2.69 sq mi (6.98 km^{2})
  - Land: 2.69 sq mi (6.97 km^{2})
  - Water: 0.0039 sq mi (0.01 km^{2})
- Elevation: 784 ft (239 m)

Population (2020)
  - Total: 3,546
  - Density: 1,283.2/sq mi (495.44/km^{2})
- Time zone: UTC-6 (Central (CST))
  - Summer (DST): UTC-5 (CDT)
- ZIP: 54165
- Area code: 920
- FIPS code: 55-72725
- GNIS feature ID: 1573932
- Website: cityofseymourwi.org

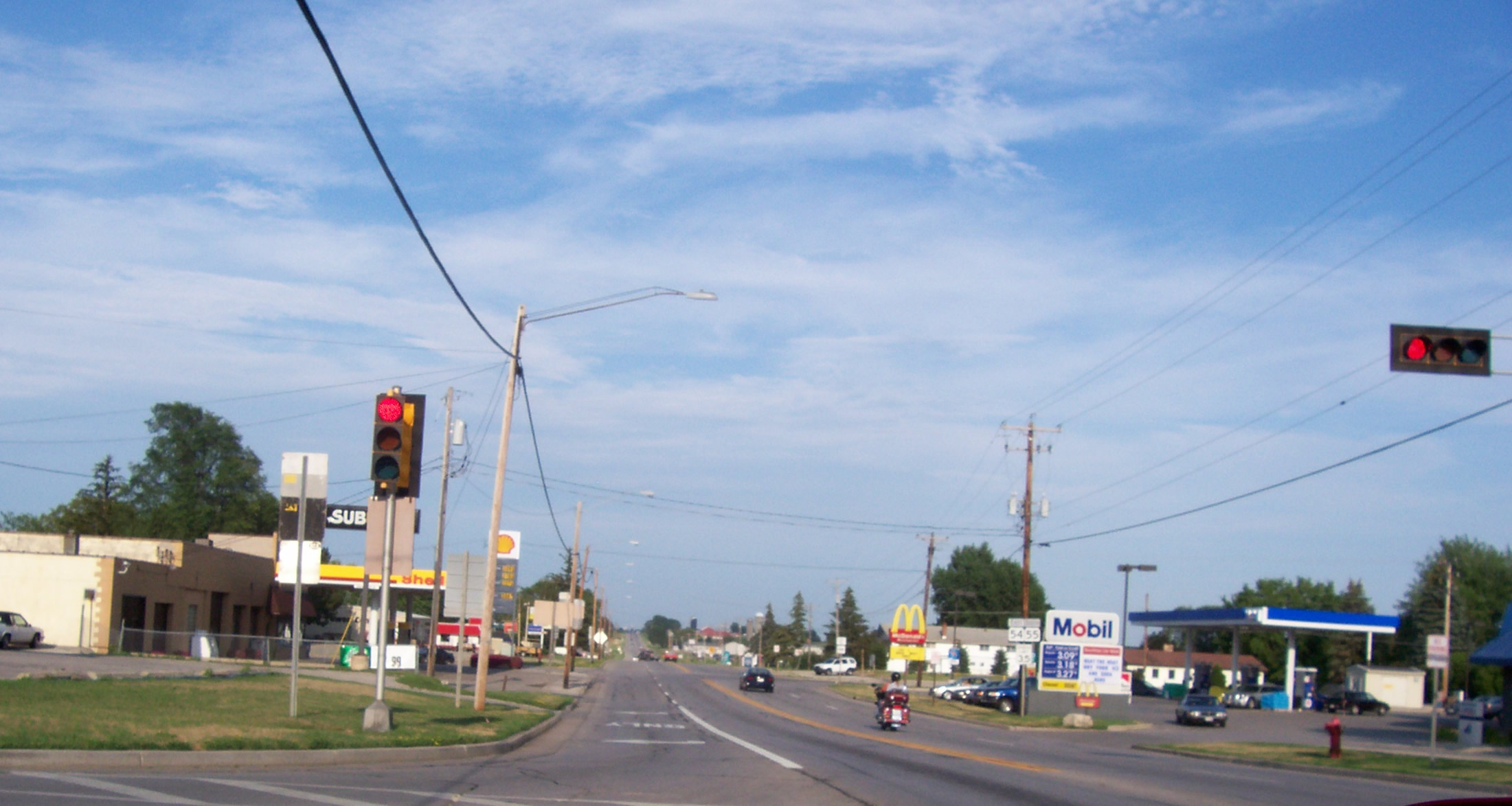
Looking east

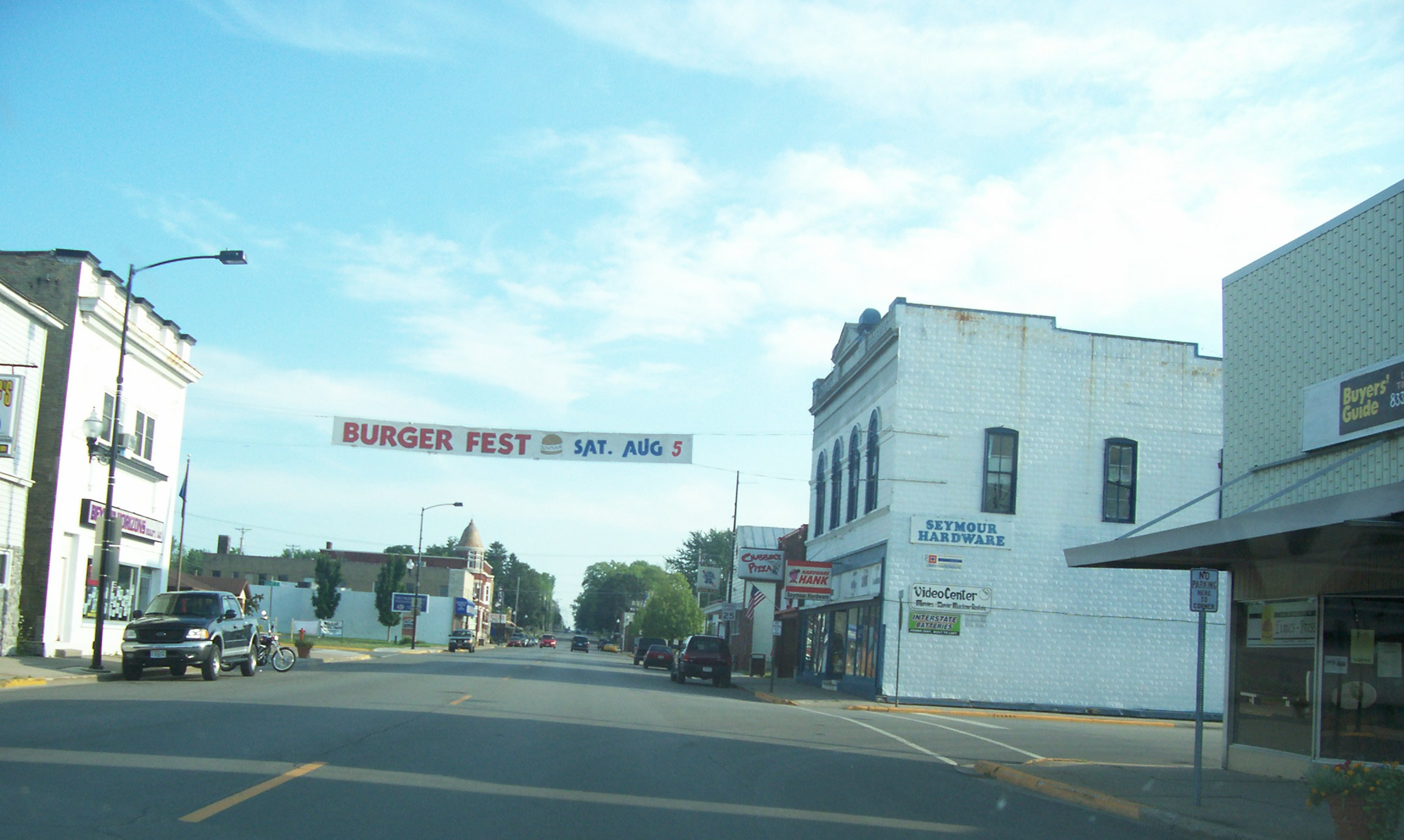
Banner advertising 2006 Burgerfest

Seymour is a city in Outagamie County, Wisconsin, United States. The population was 3,546 at the 2020 census. The city is located within the Town of Seymour and the Town of Osborn.

== History ==
Seymour was founded in 1868 and named after Governor Horatio Seymour of New York.

William and John Ausbourne were the first settlers in Seymour. They had traveled from western Outagamie County on the Wolf River during the summer of 1857, making their way to the mouth of the Shioc River and moving to a spot where the Black Creek flows into the Shioc. After finding no more roads to follow, the Ausbournes settled in the present location of Seymour, which was occupied by Native Americans at the time. There they built a log house, the only residence in Seymour for two years. Their closest neighbors lived in Osborn.

Over the years more settlers came to Seymour. Henry Becker and Herman Husmann came in 1859, and Willis and Dan Mungers arrived later that year. They built a house on what is now Main Street and their daughter Sally lived in a frame house on what is now South Main Street. Erastus C. Buttles came during the spring and established a farm in the western part of the county. Leaonard and Avery Carter arrived in Seymour in 1876, along with Charles Eichler, the first German settler in the area.

As more settlements were established in the area, the population grew. On March 1, 1877 Seymour became a recognized town, along with the towns of Osborn and Freedom.

During the early 1880s, construction of the Green Bay and Lake Pepin Railroad was completed. In 1883 a station was built in Seymour, and soon Seymour was recognized as the smallest incorporated city in the nation.

When the settlers had built their houses, they turned to education, electing a school superintendent and an establishing a school tax. The schoolhouse was a simple one-room building with no floor and a shake roof.

Between 1887 and 1889 George E. Mendell published the first newspaper, The Aurora, which lasted only three years. On July 8, 1886 the Seymour Press made its first appearance, and was published by the Van Vuren family for over 80 years. It was then sold to the Shellman Publishing Company of Oconto Falls, and is still published today.

Charlie Nagreen served the world's first hamburger at the Seymour Fair of 1885 when he decided to flatten a meatball and place it between slices of bread to increase portability.

The Seymour Community Historical Society was officially incorporated on October 11, 1975. A dedicated group of local historians led by Tom Duffey, Rita Gosse, and Bill Collar established the society with the assistance of the State Historical Society of Wisconsin. Since its inception, SCHS members have been active in collecting and preserving records and physical objects relating to the city of Seymour and the surrounding area.

On July 21, 2012 the new Seymour Community Museum opened. The new facility was built for $1.2 million, which was entirely funded by private donors.

== Geography ==
Seymour is located at 44°30′30″N 88°19′42″W (44.508499, -88.3284).

According to the United States Census Bureau, the city has a total area of 2.67 square miles (6.92 km^{2}), all land.

== Demographics ==
Historical population
Census	Pop.	Note	%±
1880	850		—
1890	733		−13.8%
1900	1,026		40.0%
1910	1,109		8.1%
1920	1,280		15.4%
1930	1,201		−6.2%
1940	1,365		13.7%
1950	1,760		28.9%
1960	2,045		16.2%
1970	2,194		7.3%
1980	2,530		15.3%
1990	2,782		10.0%
2000	3,335		19.9%
2010	3,451		3.5%
2020	3,546		2.8%
U.S. Decennial Census

As of 2000 the median income for a household in the city was $44,135, and the median income for a family was $50,746. Males had a median income of $36,789 versus $24,375 for females. The per capita income for the city was $19,073. About 4.2% of families and 3.6% of the population were below the poverty line, including 2.4% of those under age 18 and 8.8% of those age 65 or over.

=== 2010 census ===
As of the census of 2010, there were 3,451 people, 1,458 households, and 915 families residing in the city. The population density was 1,292.5 inhabitants per square mile (499.0/km^{2}). There were 1,565 housing units at an average density of 586.1 per square mile (226.3/km^{2}). The racial makeup of the city was 94.3% White, 0.3% African American, 2.6% Native American, 0.2% Asian, 0.7% from other races, and 1.8% from two or more races. Hispanic or Latino people of any race were 2.0% of the population.

There were 1,458 households, of which 33.7% had children under the age of 18 living with them, 47.4% were married couples living together, 11.4% had a female householder with no husband present, 4.0% had a male householder with no wife present, and 37.2% were non-families. 32.0% of all households were made up of individuals, and 16.2% had someone living alone who was 65 years of age or older. The average household size was 2.36 and the average family size was 2.99.

The median age in the city was 36.1 years. 26.5% of residents were under the age of 18; 8.3% were between the ages of 18 and 24; 27.7% were from 25 to 44; 22.7% were from 45 to 64; and 14.7% were 65 years of age or older. The gender makeup of the city was 48.1% male and 51.9% female.

== Infrastructure ==
=== Transportation ===
WIS 55, also marked as Main Street Northbound, routes to Angelica. Southbound, WIS 55 routes to U.S. Highway 41.
WIS 54 Westward routes to Black Creek and New London. Eastward WIS 54 routes to Green Bay.
Going Northbound Hwy C, or Ivory Street, routes to WIS 54/WIS 55. Going Southbound Hwy C routes to Highway E.
Hwy G's, or Pearl Street, Western Terminus is WIS 47 and its Eastern Terminus is Hwy Y.

=== Airports near Seymour ===
Major airports near Seymour include Austin Straubel International Airport (public) in Ashwaubenon, and Appleton International Airport (public) in Greenville.

== Education ==
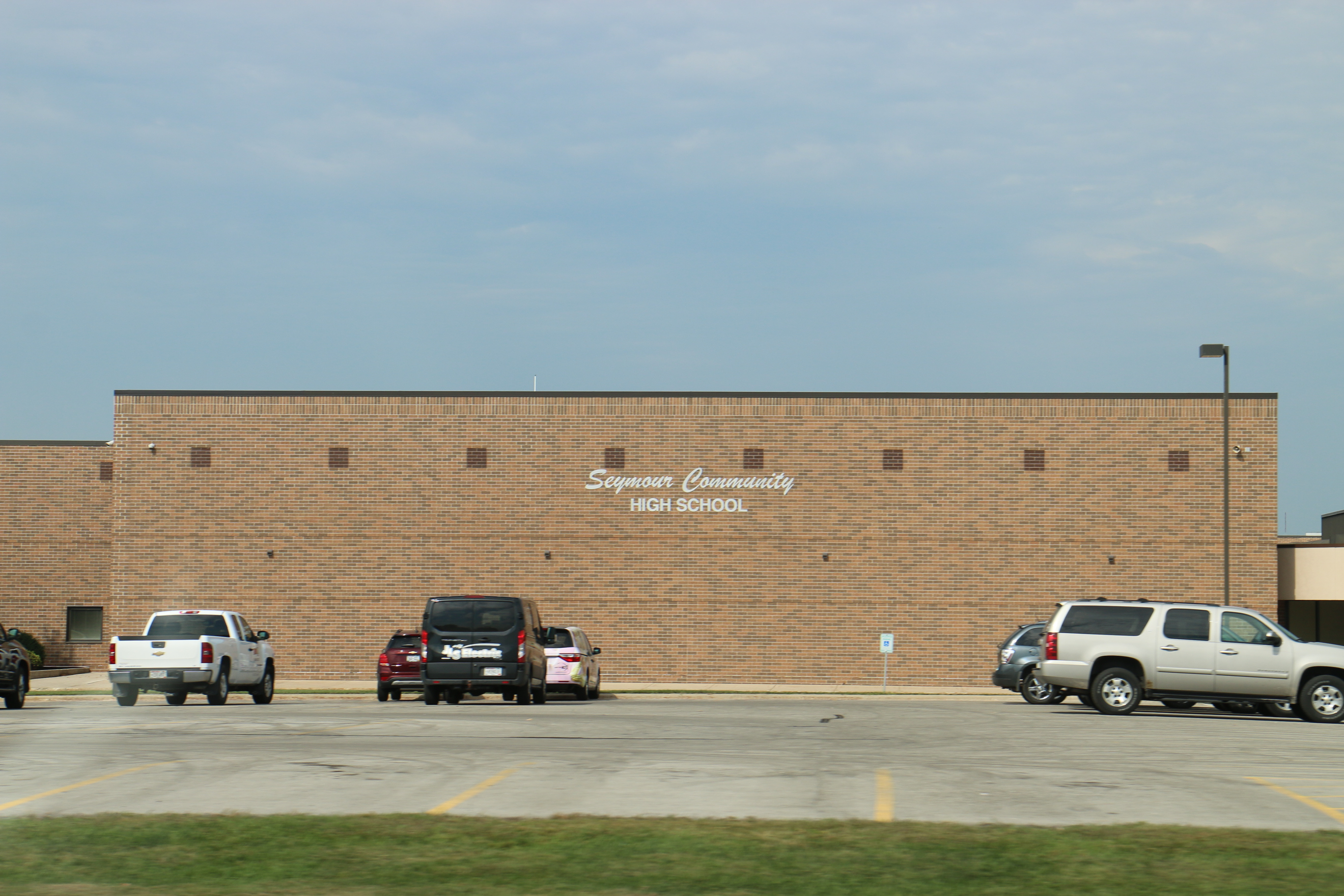
Seymour Community High School

Seymour has one middle school, one high school and one elementary school, all part of the Seymour Community School District. The district was established in 1963 with the consolidation of a number of rural schools. It encompasses 175 square miles (450 km^{2}) of land adjacent to the Fox River Valley Cities of Green Bay and Appleton, and covers all or part of 12 municipalities in northern Outagamie and southern Shawano counties. Five schools comprise the district: Rock Ledge Primary Center, Rock Ledge Intermediate Center, Seymour Middle School, Seymour High School and the Black Creek Elementary/Middle School.

The school's facilities includes a 27,000-square-foot (2,500 m^{2}) athletic center that seats over 1,800. The district has an aquatic center with an eight-lane competition pool, a zero depth activity pool and a diving well.

== Media ==
=== Newspapers ===
Newspapers that serve Seymour include the Advertiser Community News~Times Press; based in Seymour, the Green Bay Press-Gazette, based in Green Bay; and The Post~Crescent, based in Appleton.

=== Radio stations ===
WFZZ (104.3 The Fuse) is the only radio station located within the city limits.

=== Television appearances ===
On June 30, 2011, Only in America with Larry the Cable Guy, from the History Channel, filmed a segment at the "Home of the Hamburger" for an episode to be aired in 2012.

In 2012, the British children travel comedy series All Over The Place featured the CBBC presenters Ed Petire and Michelle Ackerley visiting the "Home of the Hamburger" fest for the Main Event segment.

== Attractions ==
=== Hamburger Hall of Fame ===
Seymour's Hamburger Hall of Fame is an elaborate structure that celebrates hamburger history. There is also an annual one-day Burger Fest. In 1989 the world's largest hamburger (5,520 pounds) was served at the festival. Because there have been no challenges to the record, the annual big burger now averages around 190 pounds. The annual festival, which occurs in the first week of August, includes a 5K run Bun Run, the world's longest hamburger parade down Main Street, a hamburger-eating contest, Balloon Rally, and a ketchup slide. The festival has a different theme each year. A statue of Charlie Nagreen is located on Depot Street.

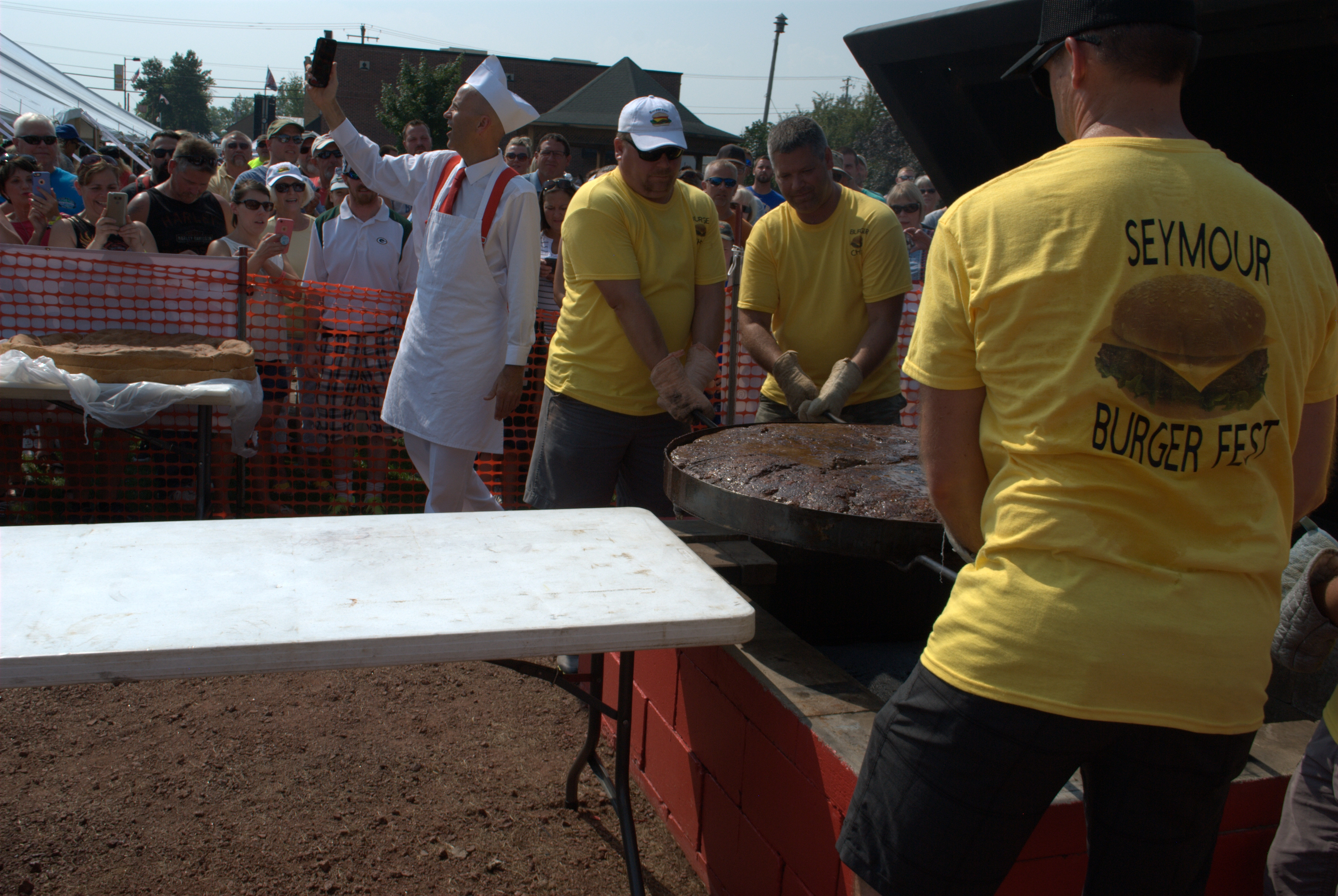
Giant burger 2018

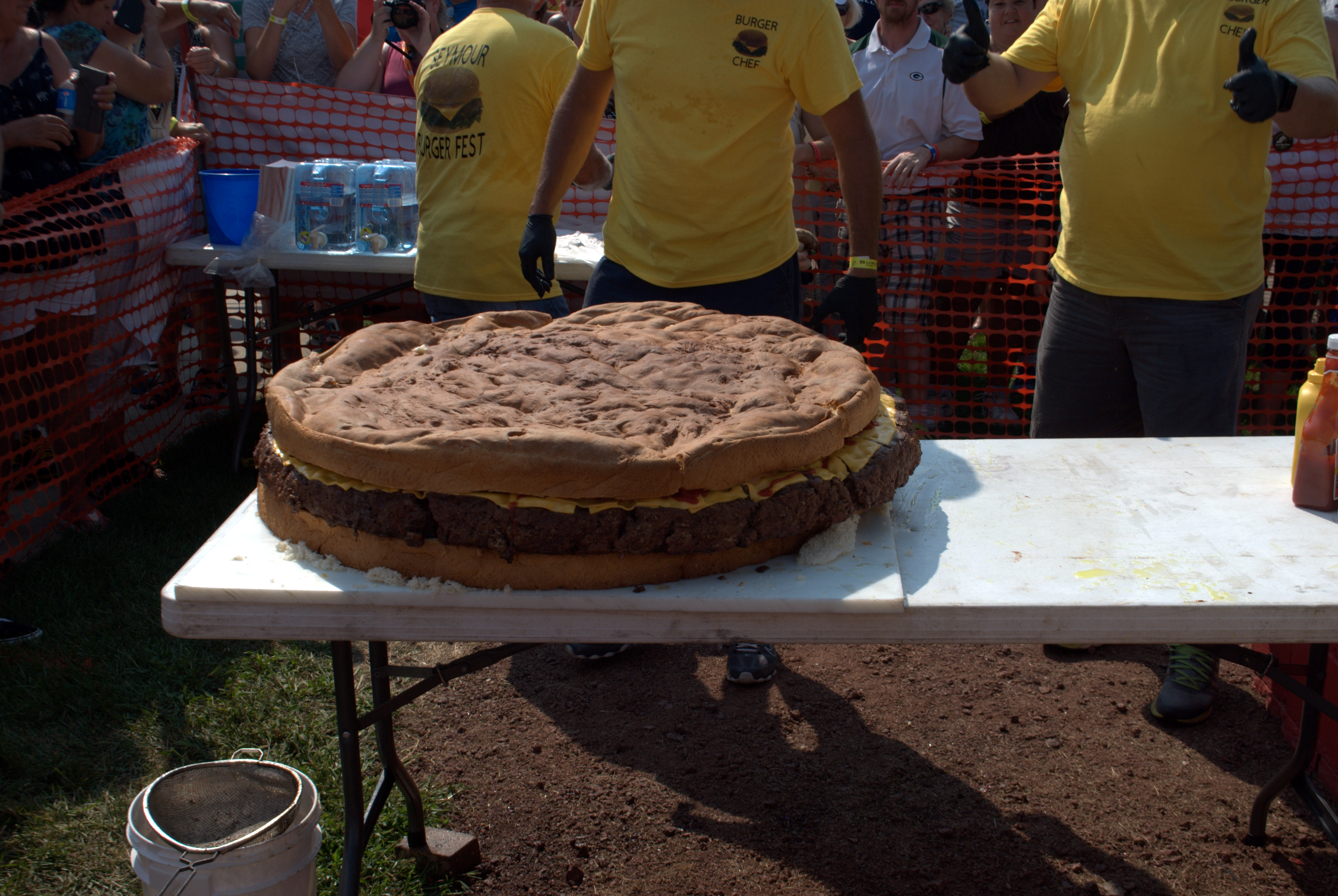
Giant burger 2018

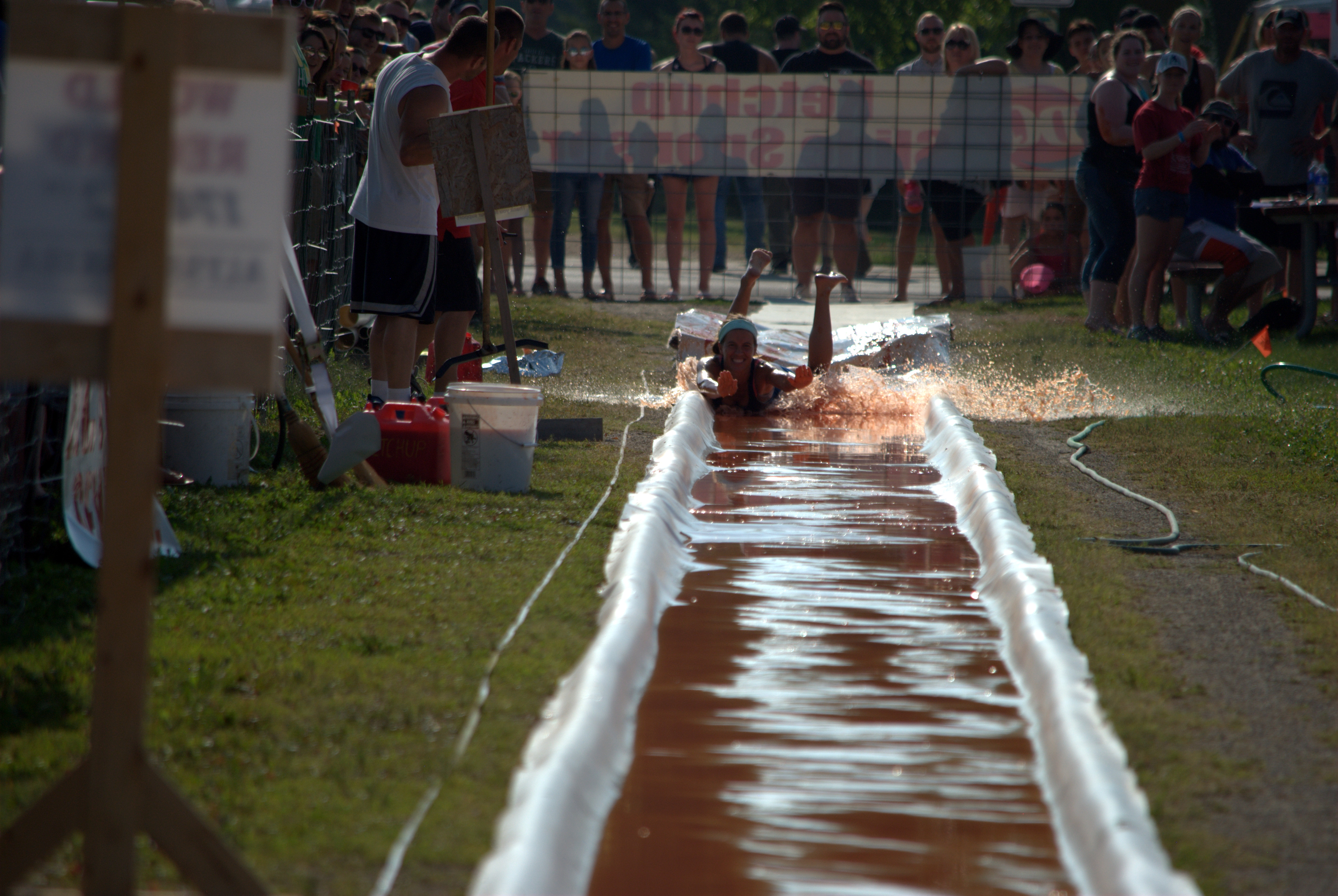
Ketchup slide 2018

=== Outagamie County Fairgrounds ===
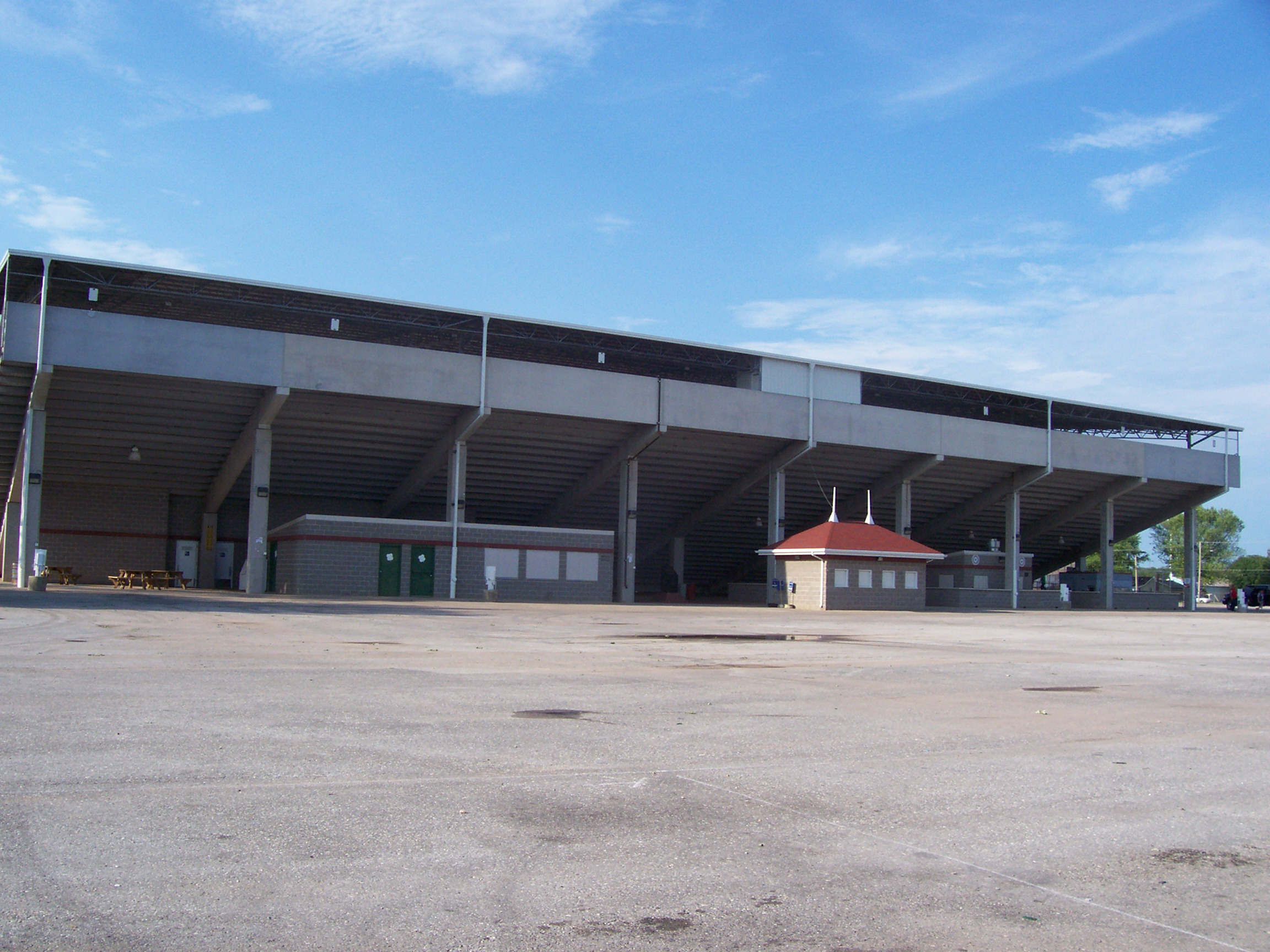
Outagamie County Fairgrounds grandstands

Seymour is home to the annual Outagamie County Fair. It features 4-H crafts, livestock, carnival rides and games, and nightly concerts.

=== Seymour Community Museum ===
The Seymour Community Museum collects and preserves records and physical objects relating to the city and the surrounding area. The museum is located on Depot Street in downtown Seymour.

=== Outagamie Speedway ===
Outagamie Speedway, located at the Outagamie County Fairgrounds in Seymour, is a 1/3 mile (540 m) clay racetrack, with modern grandstands and facilities. It hosts races in several divisions, including IMCA Modifieds, IMCA Stock Cars, IMCA Northern Sport Mods, Street Stocks, and 4 cylinders. Races are held every Friday night during the summer. At the end of the season each division crowns a champion based on a points system, much like NASCAR does.

=== Newton-Blackmour State Trail ===
The Newton Blackmour State Trail extends 24 miles from Seymour to New London. The trail is used for snowmobiles, snowshoeing, and cross country skiing in winter; and hiking, biking, and horseback riding in summer. The name "Newton-Blackmour" is made up from the four incorporated communities on the trail.

== Notable people ==
- Marvin E. Babbitt, Wisconsin politician
- Sandy Cohen, professional basketball player
- Laura Cornelius Kellogg, Oneida leader, author, orator and activist
- Ty Majeski, racing driver
- Carlisle Runge, lawyer and diplomat
- Calahan Skogman, American actor and former collegiate basketball and football player

== Images ==
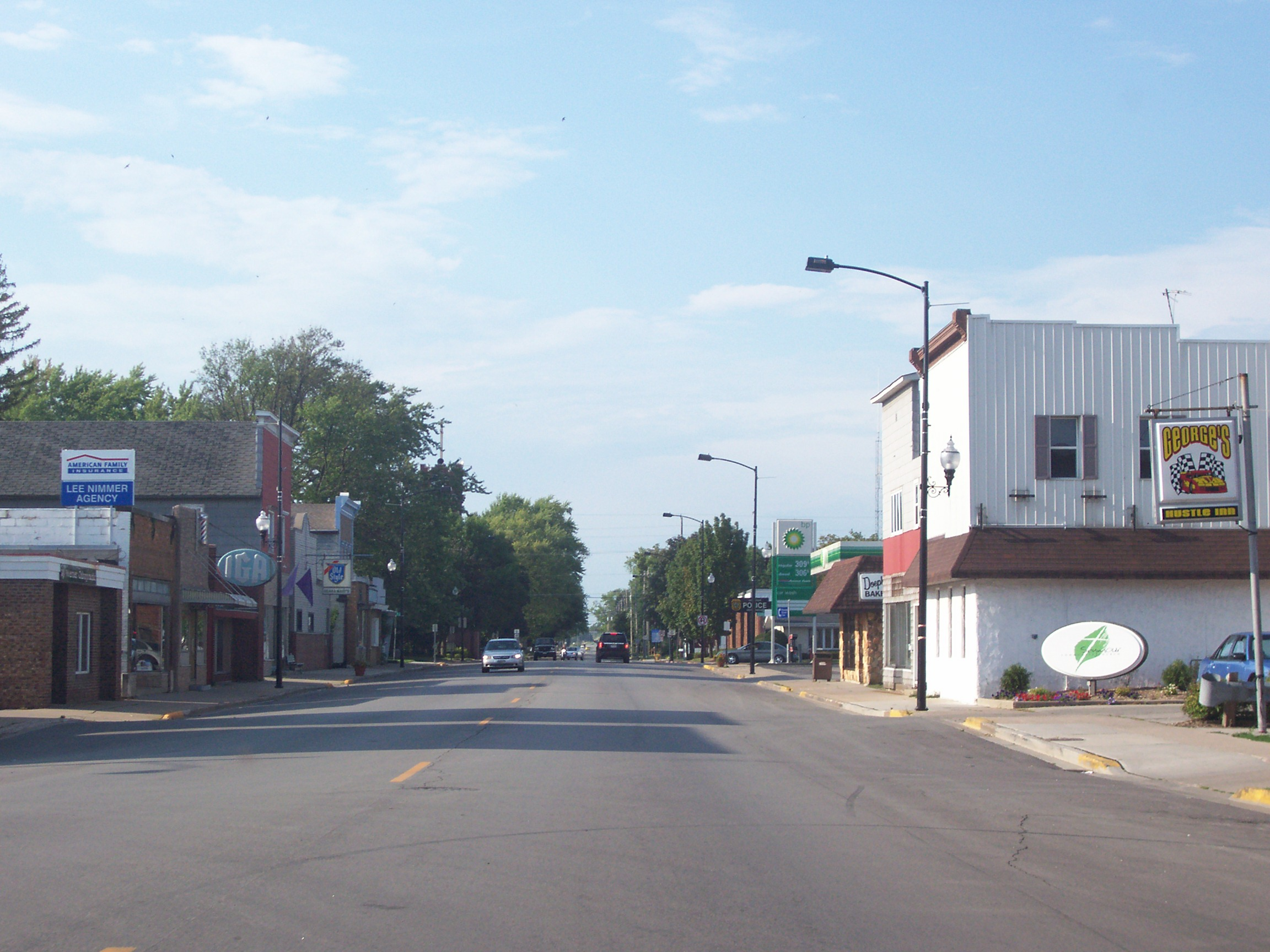
Northbound on Highway 55

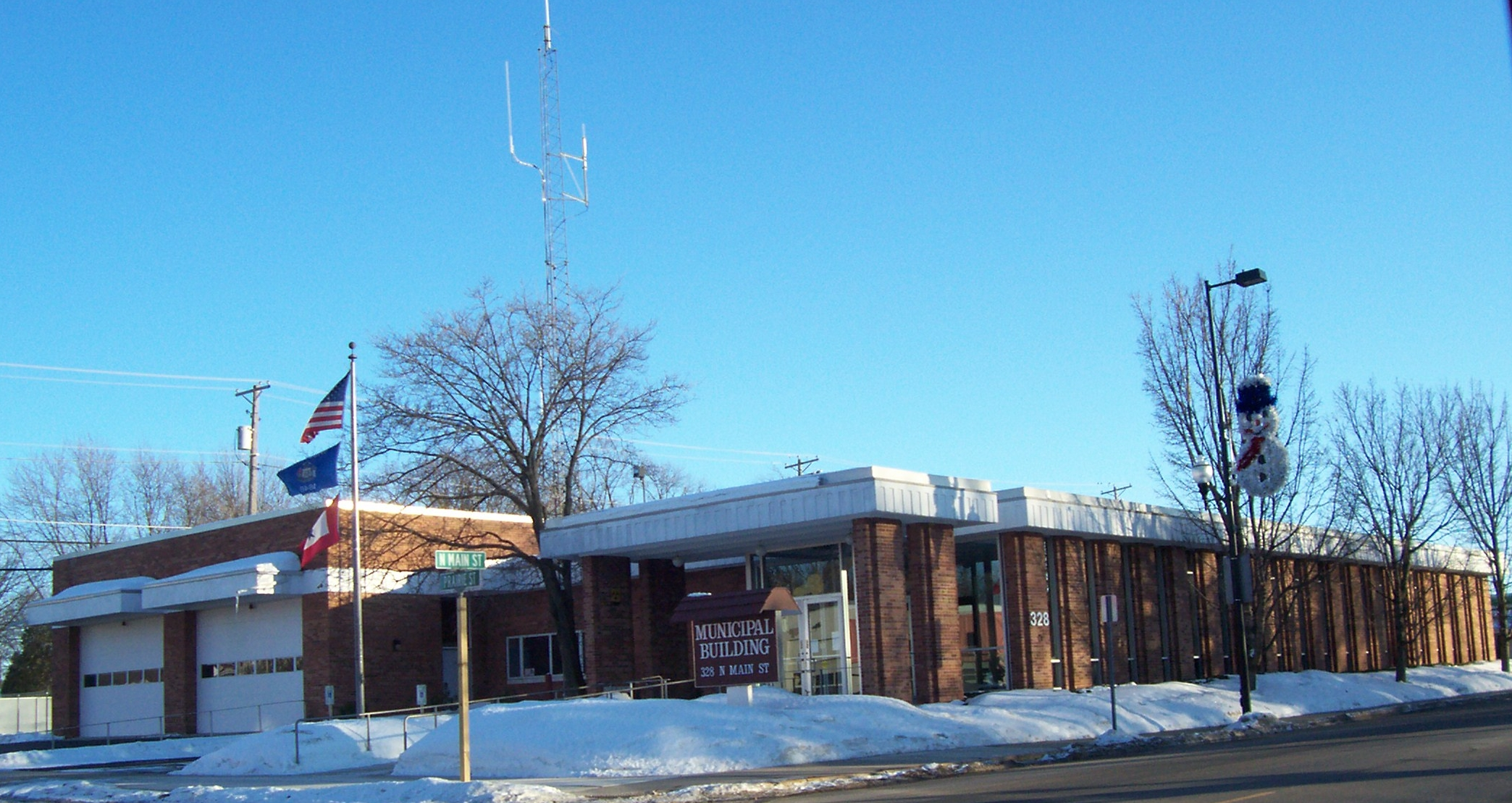
City hall

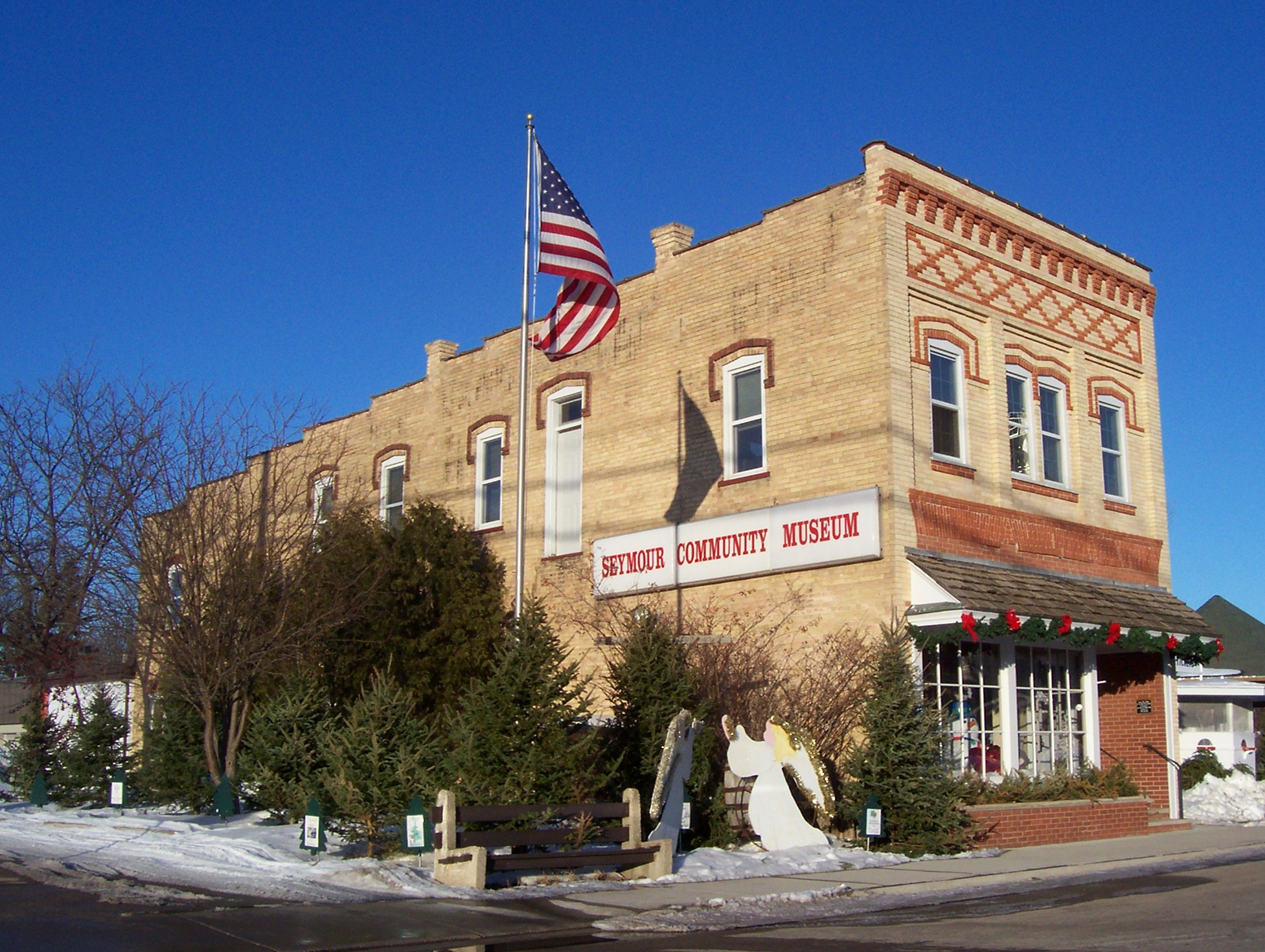
Seymour Community Museum

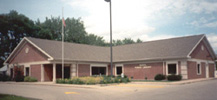
Muehl Public Library
