= Nikki Fox =

English broadcaster, presenter and documentary maker

- Born: 3 March 1980 (age 46); Hillingdon, Middlesex, England
- Education: Brunel University
- Occupations: Presenter, journalist
- Employer: BBC

Nikki Fox (born 3 March 1980) is an English broadcaster, presenter and documentary maker. She is a Sony Award-winning journalist who presents for television and network radio. Fox appeared on various TV and radio shows including Watchdog, The One Show, How to Look Good Naked, and Rip-Off Britain. She is one of the first female disabled TV presenters in the world and has been voted one of the most influential disabled people in the UK.

Fox was born with muscular dystrophy and has used a wheelchair for the majority of her adult life.

== Career ==
Nikki Fox has a B.A. (Hons) in music from Brunel University and has studied music theory, piano, opera, composition, analysis and criticism of 20th-century music.

She began working at BBC Radio Cambridgeshire on the Peterborough Breakfast Show, presenting Fox's What's On Guide, as well as competitions and she then won a place on a Channel 4 Disability Researcher Training Scheme and started working at Maverick TV, Channel 4 and ITV. In 2010, Nikki was a researcher and co-presenter on Gok Wan's How to Look Good Naked with a Disability, a Channel 4 show.

She has been nominated for Best On Screen talent at the Cultural Diversity Network Awards in 2010. Fox researched and presented a major documentary for BBC Radio 5 Live, Beyond Disability: The Adventures of a Blue Badger where she set out to discover what it is really like being disabled in the UK in 2012. It won a Sony accolade and the 2012 New York Festivals Radio Programme and Promotion Awards.

In June 2014 she was appointed disability news correspondent for the BBC. Fox said: "I am beyond excited to be joining BBC News and am thrilled to be able to work as part of a specialist team of journalists, dedicated to the reporting of disability issues for a national audience, in a new and fresh way."

In 2015 she won a New York Festival Radio Award for Learning to Walk Again, a radio programme she presented for BBC Radio 5 Live.

In 2016, she was awarded as Journalist of the Year at the 2016 European Diversity Awards. Also that year she joined the BBC Watchdog team as a presenter and appeared on an episode of BBC's Celebrity Mastermind.
