= Mike Scott (broadcaster) =

British television broadcaster (1932–2008)

Michael John Christopher Scott (8 December 1932 – 30 May 2008) was a British television producer and presenter. He is best remembered for his TV talk show, The Time, The Place, and his work as a reporter on World in Action.

Scott was born in London and educated at Latymer Upper School, Hammersmith, London, and Clayesmore School in Dorset. He served as a second lieutenant in the Royal Army Ordnance Corps during his national service. After leaving the Army, Scott worked as a salesman for Unilever before becoming a stage hand at the Royal Festival Hall. Scott gained an Equity card and went on to appear as an extra in films such as Above Us the Waves and The Quatermass Xperiment.

In 1955, Scott joined the Rank Organisation as a trainee cameraman before moving to Granada Television as a floor manager in 1956. He eventually became a programme director and then a producer and presenter at Granada. He also hosted the pilot episode of The Krypton Factor but he turned down the chance to host the series in fear of undermining his credibility as a serious journalist which opened the door for Gordon Burns to step in. Scott was programme controller at Granada from 1979 until 1987. From 1987 to 1993, Scott presented The Time, The Place.
