= Art Ninja =

- Genre: Children's; Art; Sitcom
- Created by: Alan Robinson; Jo Killingley
- Written by: Nick Hutchings; Howard Davidson (2017-present)
- Directed by: Geoff Coward
- Presented by: Ricky Martin
- Starring: Ricky Martin; Gavin Strange; Sarah Matthews; Rich Thorne; Michelle Ackerley; Ella Trudgeon; Terry Martin
- Narrated by: Enn Reitel
- Composer: Dobs Vye
- Country of origin: United Kingdom
- Original language: English
- No. of series: 5
- No. of episodes: 55

Production
- Executive producers: Hugh Lawton; Jo Killingley
- Producers: Nick Hutchings; Richard Hunt (2017-present)
- Running time: 28 minutes
- Production company: Dot to Dot Productions

Original release
- Network: CBBC
- Release: 17 January 2015 – 7 April 2019

Art Ninja is a British children's television art-sitcom hybrid hosted by Ricky Martin. The show is produced by Dot to Dot Productions for CBBC and began on 17 January 2015. The series follows presenter Ricky and his life where he makes arts with his friends Rich Thorne, Michelle Ackerley, Gavin "Gav" Strange and Sarah Matthews. Ella Lia Trudgeon and Ricky's dad, Terry Martin also appears in some episodes. Five series of 10 episodes (Series 5 had 15 episodes) each have been aired. Short compilation episodes are as Nine Minute Ninja.

A fifth series was commissioned by CBBC in Spring 2018, which aired in 2019.

== Format ==
Each episode follows a sitcom format with instructional art segments, like Art Attack or SMart. Each episode's makes has a theme to them, such as animals or aliens. An episode will usually consist of several small crafts the viewer is able to make at home, an animation, a small drawing on a sticky note, a craft made with a viewer on Skype, a small craft with the character The Grandmaster and a big craft, usually using a large amount of a certain material, like coins or clingfilm. Usually, the episodes end with the days events taking a turn for the worse just as Ricky is about to go to sleep. This results in Ricky sitting up and screaming. In series 5, this is no longer limited to his bed.

== Production ==
Art Ninja came around after Ricky Martin's pilot, Ricky's Radical Reinventions was not picked up by CBBC. Dot to Dot Productions were looking for a recommission of their former art series, Totally Rubbish. However, CBBC's commissioner Cheryl Taylor wanted to create a new art brand. According to Martin, the series was aiming to be "The Naked Chef, meets art, meets Jackass." The working title for the series was Art Monkey.

== Episodes ==
Series	Episodes	Originally released	
Series	Episodes	First released	Last released
1	10	17 January 2015	21 March 2015
2	10	30 January 2016	2 April 2016
3	10	21 January 2017	1 July 2017
4	10	20 January 2018	24 March 2018
5	15	16 December 2018	7 April 2019

=== Series 1 (2015) ===
No. overall	No. in season	Title	Directed by	Written by	Original release date
1	1	"Day of the Birdman"	Geoff Coward	Nick Hutchings	17 January 2015
Ricky is reminded of his childhood pet Mr Chicken and creates a collage to help him find his old feathered friend.
2	2	"Day of the Disguise"	Geoff Coward	Nick Hutchings	24 January 2015
Ricky has forgotten his friend Sarah's birthday so he throws a surprise party to make it up to her.
3	3	"Day of the Goblins"	Geoff Coward	Nick Hutchings	31 January 2015
Ricky demonstrates how to animate a submarine and create a bookend using a rubber glove.
4	4	"Day of the Lucky Trunks"	Geoff Coward	Nick Hutchings	7 February 2015
Before he joins his friends at the beach, Ricky shows how to make cool stuff.
5	5	"Day of the Angry Cloud"	Geoff Coward	Nick Hutchings	14 February 2015
Ricky can't go out because of the rain so he makes a water picture inspired by J. M. W. Turner.
6	6	"Day of the Decoration"	Geoff Coward	Nick Hutchings	21 February 2015
Sarah foolishly asks Ricky and Gav to paint her flat while she is out.
7	7	"Day of the Trash"	Geoff Coward	Nick Hutchings	28 February 2015
Ricky attempts to tidy up but his dad brings around a box of his old junk.
8	8	"Day of the Aliens"	Geoff Coward	Nick Hutchings	7 March 2015
Ricky is inspired by extraterrestrials to make alien gloop. He also makes a Venus flytrap.
9	9	"Day of the Bug"	Geoff Coward	Nick Hutchings	14 March 2015
Ricky has a cold, but that hasn't stopped him from making art. He makes a nosey tissue dispenser.
10	10	"Day of the Dog"	Geoff Coward	Nick Hutchings	21 March 2015
Ricky accidentally becomes a dogsitter. This inspires him to make a fake dog with a collar.

=== Series 2 (2016) ===
No. overall	No. in season	Title	Directed by	Written by	Original release date
11	1	"Day of the Prank"	Geoff Coward	Nick Hutchings	30 January 2016
Gav plays a devious prank on Ricky, so he decides to get his own back using six thousand cups of juice.
12	2	"Day of the Game"	Geoff Coward	Nick Hutchings	6 February 2016
Gav won't stop playing games on Ricky's phone and despite his best efforts Ricky can't distract him.: Note: Hacker T. Dog and Dodge T. Dog make cameo appearances in this episode.
13	3	"Day of the Spider"	Geoff Coward	Nick Hutchings	13 February 2016
Gav brings round his new pet and Ricky makes butterfly art inspired by Damien Hirst.
14	4	"Day of the Diamond"	Geoff Coward	Nick Hutchings	20 February 2016
Something sparkly and expensive is delivered to the flat, and Ricky thinks a scary man wants it back.
15	5	"Day of the Time Machine"	Geoff Coward	Nick Hutchings	27 February 2016
Ricky wishes he could go back in time after spilling paint on a priceless rug, so he downloads App To The Future.
16	6	"Day of the Dragon"	Geoff Coward	Nick Hutchings	5 March 2016
Ricky orders a takeaway, but will his fortune cookies' predictions come true?
17	7	"Day of the Baby"	Geoff Coward	Nick Hutchings	12 March 2016
Ricky is looking after his baby niece and has to use his ninja skills to try to keep her amused.
18	8	"Day of the Band"	Geoff Coward	Nick Hutchings	19 March 2016
Ricky decides to form a band, but the instruments he orders don't quite fit the bill.
19	9	"Day of the Werewolf"	Geoff Coward	Nick Hutchings	26 March 2016
Gav turns up at the flat, but Ricky thinks there is something a bit strange about his mate.
20	10	"Day of the Six-Pack"	Geoff Coward	Nick Hutchings	2 April 2016
Ricky decides to get in shape and makes healthy art, including fruit pom-poms and a salad face place mat.

=== Series 3 (2017) ===
No. overall	No. in season	Title	Directed by	Written by	Original release date
21	1	"Day of the Animals"	Geoff Coward	Nick Hutchings	21 January 2017
Gav can't find the right animal costume to run the local marathon. Ricky helps him decide by making a piranha fish bag and a baboon chalk picture.
22	2	"Day of the Match"	Geoff Coward	Howard Davidson and Nick Hutchings	28 January 2017
Ricky's never been good at football, so is horrified to hear his dad has entered him and his 'make-believe' girlfriend into a family tournament.
23	3	"Day of the Egg"	Geoff Coward	Howard Davidson and Nick Hutchings	4 February 2017
Ricky thinks he has nothing to spread on his toast, until a giant egg is delivered. Worried it could contain a baby Tyrannosaurus rex, Ricky distracts himself with art.: Note: Hacker T. Dog makes a cameo appearance in this episode.
24	4	"Day of the Yeti"	Geoff Coward	Nick Hutchings	11 February 2017
Ricky hears that a Yeti has been spotted in Bristol and he is determined to lure the mysterious creature and be the first to photograph it.
25	5	"Day of the Dream"	Geoff Coward	Nick Hutchings	18 February 2017
Ricky is having really weird dreams, which lead to him to make surreal art including giant hands and a burger hat inspired by René Magritte.
26	6	"Day of the Vlog"	Geoff Coward	Nick Hutchings	25 February 2017
Gav thinks that he could get rich and famous by filming a vlog about being the art ninja's annoying best friend. Ricky wants in as well.
27	7	"Day of the Invisibility"	Geoff Coward	Nick Hutchings	4 March 2017
Sarah's bought a onesie that turns her invisible and she and Ricky use it to plays tricks on Gav. Ricky conjures a geometric kite design.
28	8	"Day of the Spy"	Geoff Coward	Nick Hutchings	11 March 2017
Ricky's always wanted to be a spy, but when he starts receiving mysterious phone calls full of code words he's not so sure.
29	9	"Day of the Ancestor"	Geoff Coward	Nick Hutchings	18 March 2017
Ricky discovers he could be descended from a famous pirate.

=== Series 4 (2018) ===
No. overall	No. in season	Title	Directed by	Written by	Original release date
31	1	"Day of the Food Fest"	Geoff Coward	Nick Hutchings, Richard Hunt & Jo Killingley	20 January 2018
Ricky enters a foodie competition run by Nadiya Hussain whilst Gav cooks up some unlikely food combos.
32	2	"Day of the Fairytale"	Geoff Coward	Nick Hutchings, Richard Hunt & Jo Killingley	27 January 2018
Ricky becomes part of a fairytale when his virtual assistant trolls him. Sarah becomes a wicked witch and Gav is with three little pigs.
33	3	"Day of the Competition"	Geoff Coward	Nick Hutchings & Richard Hunt	3 February 2018
Ricky and Gav watch Officially Amazing and they rediscover their competitiveness and attempt to break several records.
34	4	"Day of the Hair"	Geoff Coward	Nick Hutchings & Richard Hunt	10 February 2018
Short Summary: Ricky buys Arry Arkright's hair potion and when Gav uses it, chaos ensues, leading Ricky to buy the antidote.
35	5	"Day of the Driving Test"	Geoff Coward	Nick Hutchings & Richard Hunt	17 February 2018
Short Summary: Ricky's nan has bought him driving lessons because she thinks he's too old to ride a skateboard. However, Ricky's not keen.
36	6	"Day Of The Gossip"	Geoff Coward	Nick Hutchings & Richard Hunt	24 February 2018
Short Summary
37	7	"Day Of The Superfan"	Geoff Coward	Nick Hutchings & Richard Hunt	3 March 2018
Short Summary: Note: Hacker T. Dog makes a cameo appearance in this episode.
38	8	"Day Of The Dummy"	Geoff Coward	Nick Hutchings & Richard Hunt	10 March 2018
Short Summary
39	9	"Day Of The Fashion"	Geoff Coward	Nick Hutchings & Richard Hunt	17 March 2018
Short Summary
40	10	"Day Of The World Trip"	Geoff Coward	Nick Hutchings & Richard Hunt	24 March 2018
Short Summary

=== Series 5 (2018 – 2019) ===
No. overall	No. in season	Title	Directed by	Written by	Original release date
41	1	"Day of the Not Christmas"	Geoff Coward	TBC	16 December 2018
Short Summary
42	2	"Day of the Clown"	Geoff Coward	TBC	13 January 2019
Short Summary: Note: Hacker T. Dog makes a cameo appearance in this episode.
43	3	"Day of the Virtual Reality"	Geoff Coward	TBC	13 January 2019
Short Summary
44	4	"Day of the Dance Off"	Geoff Coward	TBC	20 January 2019
Short Summary
45	5	"Day of the Detective"	Geoff Coward	TBC	27 January 2019
Short Summary
46	6	"Day of the Eco-Warrior"	Geoff Coward	TBC	3 February 2019
Short Summary
47	7	"Day of the Samphoo-Poo"	Geoff Coward	TBC	10 February 2019
Short Summary
48	8	"Day of the Antique"	Geoff Coward	TBC	17 February 2019
Short Summary
49	9	"Day of the Grand High Ninja"	Geoff Coward	TBC	24 February 2019
Short Summary
50	10	"Day of the Lurgy"	Geoff Coward	TBC	3 March 2019
Short Summary
51	11	"Day of the Prophecy"	Geoff Coward	TBC	10 March 2019
Short Summary
52	12	"Day of the Magician"	Geoff Coward	TBC	17 March 2019
Short Summary
53	13	"Day of the Ghost"	Geoff Coward	TBC	24 March 2019
Short Summary
54	14	"Day of the Zapper"	Geoff Coward	TBC	31 March 2019
Short Summary
55	15	"Day of the Flashback"	Geoff Coward	TBC	7 April 2019
Short Summary
