= Watchdog (TV programme) =

- The title card used in 2017, featuring the addition of "Live", referring to episodes being broadcast live when aired.
- Genre: Investigative journalism
- Directed by: Jaco Smith; Mark Harrison; Keir MacKenzie
- Presented by: Matt Allwright; Nikki Fox; Steph McGovern (See full list)
- Theme music composer: Music 4
- Country of origin: United Kingdom
- Original language: English
- No. of series: 41 (inc. daytime)
- No. of episodes: 1,084

Production
- Executive producer: Lisa Ausden
- Producers: Helen Collins; Michelle Cox; Emma Jay
- Production locations: BBC Television Centre (1980–2012); The Hospital Club (2013–2015); Broadcasting House (2016) dock10 studios (2017–2019)
- Editor: Jeff Anderson
- Running time: 60 minutes

Original release
- Network: BBC One
- Release: 14 July 1985 – 17 October 2019

Related
- Nationwide; Rogue Traders; Watchdog Test House

Watchdog is a British consumer investigative journalism programme that was broadcast on BBC One from 14 July 1985 to 17 October 2019. The programme focused on investigating complaints and concerns made by viewers and consumers over problematic experiences with traders, retailers and other companies around the UK, over customer services, products, security, and possible fraudulent/criminal behaviour. Since it first began, the programme had achieved great success in changing the awareness consumers have of their purchasing rights, as well as pushing forward for changes in company policies and consumer laws, and in some cases helping to close down businesses whose practices have left many people dissatisfied and out of pocket. The show's longstanding slogan was "the programme you cannot afford to miss".

In the course of its history, Watchdog would spawn a number of spin-off shows, and be presented by a variety of hosts. It started as a feature on Nationwide in 1980 before it became a standalone series in 1985. After 35 years, and with more than a thousand episodes aired, the BBC announced in February 2020 that Watchdog would be discontinued as a standalone series, becoming a segment on The One Show to be presented by Matt Allwright and Nikki Fox on Wednesdays at 19:00.

== History ==
Watchdog was first shown on 8 September 1980, as a pre-recorded weekly feature for BBC1's news magazine programme Nationwide, with Hugh Scully, best known for presenting the Antiques Roadshow, being its first host. After Nationwide ended in 1983, Scully continued hosting the feature on Sixty Minutes until the show's final episode in 1984. A year later, the BBC decided to make a stand-alone version of the feature, with its first episode aired on 14 July 1985. The programme's first series was aired weekly on Sunday evenings, and presented by Nick Ross and Lynn Faulds Wood. The following year, the programme was rescheduled to become part of the BBC's new daytime service. It was broadcast each weekday for fifteen minutes at 8.40am, with Ross replaced by Faulds Wood's husband, John Stapleton. The programme's new schedule was considered by Michael Grade, the BBC1 Programme Controller in 1986, as helpful to defying the laws of "television gravity" by boosting viewer figures for the launch of BBC Daytime. In autumn 1987, the BBC reverted the programme to being a weekly programme on Sunday evenings, but with the addition of repeats being shown the following day during the daytime.

In 1988, the programme received another rescheduling that saw it broadcast on Mondays during both daytime and peak time slots, but with a significant change in focus on its format. Unlike previous years, Watchdog began to employ a more forceful approach in consumer investigations, including investigating big businesses and conducting more investigative journalism. Changing their approach with their investigations led to the programme achieving many multimillion-pound product recalls by companies, the recovery of £19 million in overpaid fuel surcharges on package holidays, while also regularly featuring major name companies who had let down customers. By January 1989, peak time audiences of the show averaged around 6 million, leading the BBC to drop daytime broadcasts as a direct result. Both Faulds Wood and Stapleton remained with the programme into the early 90s until the former was diagnosed with advanced bowel cancer; after she was treated and had recovered from the condition, both Faulds Wood and Stapleton left the programme, to conduct a series of journalistic investigations for ITV's World in Action.

For the 1993 series, the BBC decided upon assigning Anne Robinson as the new host of Watchdog. This decision had a change in style brought about by Robinson's style of presenting, including her approach to interviews with notable figures from within the companies featured in investigations on the programme. For her first series, she was teamed up with Simon Walton and Alice Beer, the latter having been an assistant producer until she was brought on as a co-presenter, assigned with being a link between the consumers (on the phone in earlier years, and e-mail in later years) and the main presenter. Walton left after the first series, while Beer remained until 1999, whereupon she was replaced by Charlotte Hudson, who remained until 2001. Because of her workload requiring her to be present with hosting the British and American versions of The Weakest Link, Robinson also left the programme that same year. Following Robinson's departure, the BBC replaced her with Nicky Campbell as the programme's main presenter, with Paul Heiney joining a year later as a regular co-presenter of his team; additional co-presenters in the team were changed during Campbell's tenure, and included Ashley Blake, Saima Mohsin, Nick Lawrence, and Dan Penteado. Between 2001 and 2004, Campbell was joined by Kate Gerbeau as the other main presenter of the programme, while between 2005 and 2009, he was joined by Julia Bradbury, who was temporarily replaced during her last series in 2009 by Anita Rani between 6 February and 20 April; Rani was retained as a reporter following this, taking the place of Mohsin.

On 10 May 2009, the BBC announced plans to relaunch the format for Watchdog, which included bringing back Anne Robinson to host the programme, and extending the length of episodes from thirty minutes to one hour. In order to make this extension, the decision was made to incorporate the format of another consumer show, Rogue Traders, as a multi-part segment of the same name, with Matt Allwright becoming a part of the presenting team alongside Robinson and Anita Rani. His co-presenter, Dan Penteado, was retained, but worked mainly within the films for the new segment. The new series of Watchdog under this new format, began airing on 10 September 2009. In 2010, Rani left the programme, leading to her being replaced by Chris Hollins. In July 2012, Dan Penteado was sacked from the programme, after it was uncovered that he had fraudulently claimed £25,000 in benefits during his work as a co-presenter, to which he was later found guilty of benefit fraud at Bournemouth Magistrates' Court and jailed for 12 weeks. On 12 November 2012, the BBC launched a daytime companion show, entitled Watchdog Daily, for weekday mornings, which ran for 4 weeks. In March 2014, the BBC launched another daytime companion show called Watchdog Test House, which was presented by Sophie Raworth, with former host Faulds Wood assisting as a reporter.

On 10 September 2015, after having spent a total of 15 years presenting the programme, Robinson left the programme to focus on her commitments to assisting with the production of BBC's Britain's Spending Secrets. Her departure led to Raworth replacing her as the new host, with Michelle Ackerley joining alongside her, Collins and Allwright. On 22 June 2016, Hollins announced his decision to step down as co-host, whereupon after his departure, Allwright was reassigned as one of the main presenters alongside Raworth, while Ackerley was demoted to being a co-presenter, with Nikki Fox and Steph McGovern being added to the lineup, with the show being moved to Dock10 studios, MediaCityUK. In 2017, Raworth and Ackerley left the programme, leading to McGovern joining Allwright as a main presenter. The show was also given a more permanent studio at Dock10 for the 2017 series.

On 21 February 2020, the BBC announced that Watchdog will cease to be broadcast as a standalone series, but will be aired instead as a feature in The One Show. The segment on The One Show will be presented by Matt Allwright and Nikki Fox. In May 2026, the reporting team was expanded to include consumer journalist Nick Stapleton and presenter Amber Haque.

== Format ==
Watchdog primarily consists of films involving journalistic investigations into consumer complaints, brought to the attention of the programme's research team by viewers and customers, in which the general basis of the investigation is to look into issues, concerns and complaints made about businesses and companies in regards to products/services offered, the quality of customer care, and other concerns/issues/problems that have arisen of late. Films usually consist of one or two major components - tests conducted by the research team, into various aspects such as quality, value for money, safety and hygiene, and so forth; and interviews with some of the consumers who contacted the programme, in regards to their experience with the company/business connected to the investigation that the interviewee had dealings with, what concerns and worries they have about a product/service they purchased and their overall general opinion of the business.

The film is usually presented to viewers by either one of Watchdog's current presenters, or a reporter for the programme, who gives out a general overlay of the matter being investigated, and conducts interviews with the consumers that were affected. Towards the end of the film, a response from the businesses/companies involved (if provided) is often given, which can include their views on the programme's findings, if any issues raised have been dealt with, and if the consumers featured on the programme have had their complaints dealt with. If the programme puts forward their findings to any regulatory bodies connected to the product/service offered, including Trading Standards, they will also read out a response from them, including any consumer advice regarding the issues featured in the film.

In some investigations, hidden cameras are used to record specific areas of the investigation, that are done in secret by the research team; an example of this is when researchers pose as customers, go to different branches of a business under investigation, and secretly record a conversation between themselves and a number of employees they randomly approach, mainly on answers given in regards to consumer inquires they make (i.e. "What is the cooling down period for returning an item if we aren't satisfied?"). In a number of investigations where multiple companies/businesses are being investigated on the same aspects under investigation, researchers will usually conduct secret testing on multiple branches used by each business/company being investigated, to which their findings in regards to concerns and/or failings on anything (such as hygiene, safety, and customer service for example), are revealed during the film, including a comparison between the branches visited and how they match up to findings made in the other branches.

In some cases, company representatives are invited to discuss the consumer problems that were investigated by Watchdog, although a number frequently turn down the offer. However, many companies use the opportunity to voice their own opinions and thoughts on the subject of the investigation, some of whom also take advantage of the situation to offer full apologies and refunds to affected customers. From the start of 2000, company interviewees invited to take part in the programme are commonly given advice by media advisers before they are filmed.

== Presenters ==
Duration	Lead presenter(s)	Co-presenter(s)
1980–84	Hugh Scully	—N/a
1985–86	Nick Ross and Lynn Faulds Wood	—N/a
1986–93	Lynn Faulds Wood and John Stapleton	—N/a
1993–94	Anne Robinson	Alice Beer and Simon Walton
1994–99	Anne Robinson	Alice Beer
1999–2001	Anne Robinson	Charlotte Hudson
2001–02	Nicky Campbell and Kate Gerbeau	—N/a
2002–04	Nicky Campbell and Kate Gerbeau	Paul Heiney and Ashley Blake
2004–05	Nicky Campbell and Kate Gerbeau	Paul Heiney and Saima Mohsin
2005–08	Nicky Campbell and Julia Bradbury	Paul Heiney and Nick Lawrence
2008–09	Nicky Campbell; Julia Bradbury (episodes 1–16 and 26–30); Anita Rani (episodes 17–25)	Paul Heiney and Dan Penteado
2009–10	Anne Robinson	Anita Rani, Matt Allwright and Dan Penteado
2010–12	Anne Robinson	Chris Hollins, Matt Allwright and Dan Penteado
2012–15	Anne Robinson	Chris Hollins and Matt Allwright
2015	Sophie Raworth and Michelle Ackerley	Chris Hollins and Matt Allwright
2016	Sophie Raworth and Matt Allwright	Michelle Ackerley, Steph McGovern and Nikki Fox
2017–19	Matt Allwright and Steph McGovern	Nikki Fox

== Notable investigations ==
=== Fitted plugs ===
In the late 1980s, Watchdog investigations showed that numerous accidents were caused when the electrical plugs on new electrical appliances were incorrectly wired. At the time, all new electrical goods were sold with bare wires and customers were expected to fit plugs themselves. These investigations led to a British law forcing all manufacturers selling electrical products in the UK to supply them with fitted plugs.

=== Hoover free flights ===
In 1992 and 1993, The Hoover Company introduced a "free flights" offer whereby any customer spending over £100 would receive two free flights to New York City, a cost of ~£600, at a time before the rise of budget airlines. Due to an overwhelming response, many people did not receive their tickets and were denied the opportunity to take their free flights. After hundreds of complaints to Watchdog, an investigation by reporter Simon Walton revealed that the company in charge of processing applications was trying to deny customers their free flights in an effort to stem the rising costs. This quickly became headline news and Hoover were forced to give all customers the flights, costing them an estimated £40 million and the jobs of all the board members.

=== Auction World.tv ===
Television sales channel Auction World.tv failed to deliver goods or offer refunds to over 27,000 customers in the early 2000s, and were fined £450,000 by the regulatory body OFCOM. Investigations by Watchdog forced refunds and the closure of the channel, and traced the owner to Cyprus, where he refused to answer questions.

=== The Accident Group ===
This company was exposed by Watchdog after secret filming revealed it was encouraging members of the public to make bogus claims for personal injury compensation. As a result, The Accident Group went out of business, sacking its staff by sending them text messages.

=== Direct Kitchens, Kitchens and Maple Industries ===
Direct Kitchens, Kitchens and Maple Industries are all companies that are or have been based at Maple Mill, in Oldham, Greater Manchester and headed by controversial entrepreneur Vance Miller. The companies have been investigated by Watchdog on several occasions. Miller, who has a string of convictions in several countries, has been branded by the media as the "Kitchen Gangster", became the first person in Britain to be handed a 'Stop Now' order by the Office of Fair Trading after consistently supplying kitchens which were not sold as advertised.

=== Clarks Shoes ===
Clarks Shoes were exposed by Watchdog in successive programmes in November 2018 after receiving large numbers of complaints from viewers about shoes which had been put away brand new but were subsequently found to be falling apart because of the poor quality of the materials used in their manufacture.

== Transmissions ==
Series	Start date	End date	Episodes
1	14 July 1985	6 October 1985	13
2	15 November 1987	23 May 1988	24
3	3 October 1988	10 April 1989	24
4	4 September 1989	18 December 1989	16
5	1 October 1990	4 February 1991	17
6	30 September 1991	13 April 1992	24
7	7 September 1992	5 April 1993	28
8	6 September 1993	23 May 1994	35
9	5 September 1994	1 May 1995	32
10	4 September 1995	25 March 1996	28
11	5 September 1996	27 March 1997	29
12	4 September 1997	9 April 1998	40
13	10 September 1998	8 April 1999	29
14	9 September 1999	4 May 2000	34
15	5 October 2000	26 April 2001	29
16	13 September 2001	9 April 2002	29
17	3 September 2002	6 May 2003	30
18	2 September 2003	27 April 2004	30
19	7 September 2004	12 April 2005	30
20	6 September 2005	9 May 2006	34
21	3 October 2006	2 May 2007	29
22	3 October 2007	12 May 2008	30
23	13 October 2008	18 May 2009	30
24	10 September 2009	12 November 2009	10
25	6 May 2010	10 June 2010	10
26	9 September 2010	25 November 2010	10
27	7 April 2011	26 May 2011	8
28	1 September 2011	20 October 2011	8
29	15 March 2012	3 May 2012	8
30	12 September 2012	31 October 2012	8
31	1 May 2013	19 June 2013	8
32	18 September 2013	6 November 2013	8
33	14 May 2014	2 July 2014	7
34	16 October 2014	4 December 2014	8
35	7 May 2015	25 June 2015	6
36	8 October 2015	3 December 2015	6
37	2 November 2016	21 December 2016	6
38	28 June 2017	2 August 2017	6
39	18 April 2018	23 May 2018	6
40	31 October 2018	5 December 2018	6
41	1 May 2019	5 June 2019	6
42	12 September 2019	17 October 2019	6

=== Spin-offs ===
- Watchdog Healthcheck – 1995 to 2002, about health matters

Series	Start date	End date	Episodes	Main host
1	15 May 1995	3 July 1995	8	Judith Hann
2	15 April 1996	17 June 1996	8	Judith Hann
3	24 April 1997	19 June 1997	8	Alice Beer
4	5 January 1998	9 February 1998	6	Alice Beer
5	20 July 1998	24 August 1998	4	Alice Beer
6	4 January 1999	29 March 1999	12	Alice Beer
7	19 July 1999	14 February 2000	12	Alice Beer
8	26 June 2000	21 August 2000	9	Gaby Roslin
9	8 January 2001	19 February 2001	7	Gaby Roslin
10	4 June 2001	16 July 2001	7	Kate Gerbeau
11	7 January 2002	25 February 2002	8	Gaby Roslin

- Weekend Watchdog – 1997 to 2001, presented by Robinson (Allwright and Hudson for the final series)

Series	Start date	End date	Episodes
1	25 April 1997	13 June 1997	8
2	5 September 1997	19 December 1997	17
3	13 March 1998	5 June 1998	13
4	11 September 1998	18 December 1998	14
5	19 March 1999	4 June 1999	11
6	10 September 1999	17 December 1999	14
7	17 March 2000	14 July 2000	15
8	6 October 2000	26 January 2001	14
9	23 March 2001	15 June 2001	12

- Value for Money – 1995 to 2000, mainly about shopping, presented by Vanessa Feltz and Charlotte Hudson

Series	Start date	End date	Episodes
	10 July 1995		1
1	24 June 1996	20 August 1996	7
2	26 June 1997	28 August 1997	10
3	16 July 1998	27 August 1998	6
4	16 July 1999	3 September 1999	8
5	5 July 2000	4 October 2000	12

- Face Value – about the fashion industry, presented by Alice Beer

Series	Start date	End date	Episodes
1	6 January 1997	10 February 1997	6
2	3 June 1999	9 July 1999	6

- The Big Dinner – about the food industry, presented by Jonathan Maitland

Series	Start date	End date	Episodes
	15 January 1998		1
1	28 May 1998	15 July 1998	5

- On the House – first presented by Sankha Guha and Anne McKevitt, later Adrian Chiles

Series	Start date	End date	Episodes
1	16 April 1998	21 May 1998	6
2	22 April 1999	27 May 1999	6

- Watchdog: Are You Being Served? – 15 April 1999, presented by Alice Beer
- Watchdog Daily – live and interactive series in which Sophie Raworth takes on the big household-names, getting results and showing viewers how they can fight back

Series	Start date	End date	Episodes
1	12 November 2012	7 December 2012	20

- Watchdog Test House – testing of household products, presented by Sophie Raworth; aired in 2014 and 2015

=== Specials ===
- How To Save £1000 (15 January 2015) – BBC One
- Pension Special (5 November 2015) – BBC Red Button

== Related programmes ==
- Short Change – about consumer affairs aimed at children between 7-16-year-olds, originally presented by Zoë Ball, then Andi Peters, Tim Vincent, and up until 2003, Angellica Bell. It was then presented by Thalia Pellegrini, Rhodri Owen and Ortis Deley. Many complaints included problems with service, bad deals, and being generally ripped-off. Finished in 2005.
- Rogue Traders – undercover series examining con artists and cowboy workers
- Rogue Restaurants – spin-off series to Rogue Traders, examining restaurants

== See also ==
- Rogue Traders
- Points of View
- That's Life!
- Rip Off Britain
- Don't Get Done, Get Dom
- Short Change
- Crimewatch
- Marketplace
- Fair Go
