= Nick Lawrence =

English broadcast journalist, radio host, TV presenter (b.1966)

- Born: Nick Meir; 1966 (age 59–60)
- Occupations: Broadcast journalist, radio and television presenter
- Employer: BBC
- Notable credit(s): Watchdog; Inside Out (BBC1); The Politics Show; Rogue Traders; Whistleblower (BBC1); You and Yours (Radio 4); Face The Facts (Radio 4)
- Website: nickmeir.com

Nick Lawrence is the pen name of Nick Meir (born February 1966), a broadcast journalist, radio host, TV presenter, and producer from the United Kingdom. Between 2001 - 2012 he appeared on many BBC and radio current affairs programmes. He reported on Watchdog for three years, where he worked alongside Nicky Campbell, Julia Bradbury, and Paul Heiney (BBC1). He has also reported and produced on a number of other BBC programmes including Inside Out (BBC1), The Politics Show (BBC1), Rogue Traders (BBC1), BBC Breakfast News, Whistleblower (BBC1), You and Yours (Radio 4) and Face The Facts (Radio 4). Nick Meir now works in the private sector as a communication and media consultant.

== Early life ==
Meir was born and brought up in Halifax, West Yorkshire. He went to the Heath Grammar School. He later attended Bretton Hall College of Education where he also studied a Drama and Theatre Studies course. Meir graduated with a B.A. degree in Arts. He was an English teacher in an upper school for four years in Northamptonshire.

== Broadcasting ==
Meir started out at Northants 96 on the breakfast show in the early 90s, before moving onto presenting the breakfast show at Chiltern FM in Dunstable with Andy Gelder and Sarah Isherwood in 1996, he then hosted BBC Three Counties' breakfast show, from October 2001. It won a Sony Award Silver in 2003 for a feature on homeless people. In 2008, he was a recipient of the EDF Energy East of England Media Awards' title BBC TV East Television Journalist of the Year. In 2014, Meir established A House Called Alice, a consultancy specializing in counsel and communication improvement for companies and executives.
