= Watchdog Test House =

- Genre: Factual
- Directed by: Dan Aldridge-Neil; Ben Laidlow; Amy Lightowler; Elen Moore; Gavin Ahern
- Presented by: Sophie Raworth; Michelle Ackerley (2015); Tony Livesey (2015); Lynn Faulds Wood (2014)
- Narrated by: Mike McClean
- Theme music composer: Music 4
- Composer: Paul Keyworth
- Country of origin: United Kingdom
- Original language: English
- No. of series: 2
- No. of episodes: 30 (list of episodes)

Production
- Executive producer: Lisa Ausden
- Producers: Sarah Knight; Joanne Vaughan-Jones
- Production location: Building Research Establishment
- Camera setup: Steve Moss
- Running time: 30 minutes
- Production company: BBC Features Production

Original release
- Network: BBC One; BBC One HD
- Release: 10 March 2014 – 20 March 2015

Related
- Watchdog

Watchdog Test House is a BBC television series that was first broadcast on BBC One from 10 March 2014 until 20 March 2015. The series shows Sophie Raworth explaining how household goods are tested and how to get the best value for money. In the first series, Lynn Faulds Wood investigates product safety and reveals previous Watchdog campaigns that have saved lives.

== Production ==
BSI Group featured in four episodes of the first series, testing domestic cookers, windows and doors security, washing machines and cycle helmets. Filming took place at two of BSI's Testing Centres of Excellence; Loughborough and Hemel Hempstead. The Building Research Establishment featured in every episode of Watchdog Test House.

== Episode list ==
=== Series 1 (2014) ===
No.	Title	Original release date
1	"Episode 1"	10 March 2014
2	"Episode 2"	11 March 2014
3	"Episode 3"	12 March 2014
4	"Episode 4"	13 March 2014
5	"Episode 5"	14 March 2014
6	"Episode 6"	17 March 2014
7	"Episode 7"	18 March 2014
8	"Episode 8"	19 March 2014
9	"Episode 9"	20 March 2014
10	"Episode 10"	21 March 2014
11	"Episode 11"	24 March 2014
12	"Episode 12"	25 March 2014
13	"Episode 13"	26 March 2014
14	"Episode 14"	27 March 2014
15	"Episode 15"	28 March 2014

=== Series 2 (2015) ===
No.	Title	Original release date
1	"Episode 1"	2 March 2015
The team asks whether paying more for a cat litter will guarantee you a happier moggie and investigates the fridge freezer design flaw regularly causing ferocious house fires.
2	"Episode 2"	3 March 2015
The team asks whether expensive sun creams protect for longer in the water and investigates how modern planes are designed to withstand lightning strikes.
3	"Episode 3"	4 March 2015
The team asks how modern playgrounds are made child friendly and investigates what you should be paying for a cordless vacuum.
4	"Episode 4"	5 March 2015
The team reveals whether it is worth paying more for toilet roll and finds out how sports helmets are put through their paces to ensure maximum protection.
5	"Episode 5"	6 March 2015
The team meets the product testers blessed with super-sensitive taste buds and joins the Border Force as they fight to stop unsafe foods from entering the country.
6	"Episode 6"	9 March 2015
The team look at how to protect a home from flooding. Also, the expert's guide to making the best possible cup of tea.
7	"Episode 7"	10 March 2015
The team ask whether an expensive non-stick pan guarantee better results in the kitchen and investigates how to avoid expensive admin fees when changing holiday bookings.
8	"Episode 8"	11 March 2015
Sophie Raworth returns with the show that explains how everyday products and services are made safe for use and questions whether or not they offer decent value for money.
9	"Episode 9"	12 March 2015
The team looks at how a network of 22 thousand electricity pylons are kept maintained without turning the country's power off and investigates which toothbrushes are best for removing plaque.
10	"Episode 10"	13 March 2015
The team asks how a large-scale fireworks display is organised and ensure everyone will be safe and investigates how sound and smell are used to influence what customers buy.
11	"Episode 11"	16 March 2015
The team investigates whether paying more for a battery guarantees it will last longer and asks how you pick a garage you can trust to do car repairs.
12	"Episode 12"	17 March 2015
The team find out how modern wheelchairs are made safe and reveal which part of the house contains more germs than any other.
13	"Episode 13"	18 March 2015
The team investigate the dangers of using counterfeit electric goods and discover how to find out if your appliance has been part of a safety recall.
14	"Episode 14"	19 March 2015
The team find out how car safety has developed over the years and how you can protect your family from the dangerous food bacteria campylobacter.
15	"Episode 15"	20 March 2015
The team investigate how much money you need to spend for good quality chocolate.
