= John Stapleton (English journalist) =

English broadcaster and journalist (1946–2025)

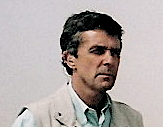
- Stapleton in 2003
- Born: John Martin Stapleton; 24 February 1946; Oldham, Lancashire, England
- Died: 21 September 2025 (aged 79)
- Occupations: Journalist; broadcaster
- Spouse: Lynn Faulds Wood (m. 1977; died 2020)
- Children: 1

John Martin Stapleton (24 February 1946 – 21 September 2025) was an English journalist and broadcaster. He was known for his work as a presenter and reporter on ITV breakfast television (TV-am, GMTV and Daybreak) in addition to hosting Nationwide and Watchdog for the BBC. He also hosted the ITV morning talk show The Time, The Place and presented the Sunday morning programme My Favourite Hymns.

Stapleton won the Royal Television Society's News Presenter of the Year award for 2003. He was married to the presenter Lynn Faulds Wood. They presented Watchdog together between 1986 and 1993.

== Early life ==
Stapleton was born in Oldham, Lancashire on 24 February 1946. His father Frank was secretary of the local co-operative and his mother June was a part-time primary school teacher. Stapleton was educated at Diggle Primary School, Hulme Grammar School, Oldham, and St John's College of Further Education, Manchester, where he took his A levels. He did not go to university, but started working as a trainee reporter at the age of seventeen on the now defunct Eccles and Patricroft Journal. He was later indentured to the Oldham Evening Chronicle for three years before moving on to the Daily Sketch, first in Manchester and then in London.

== Career ==
Stapleton's career began on local newspapers in North West England, before becoming a staff reporter on the Daily Sketch in Fleet Street. His first job in television was as a researcher and script writer on This Is Your Life, presented at the time by Eamonn Andrews.

Stapleton subsequently worked as a reporter on the Thames TV regional news magazine show Today from 1971 until 1975. In May 1972, he reported for the Today programme on the last speedway meeting at the West Ham track. He joined the BBC Nationwide programme in May 1975 as a reporter, and then became one of the main presenters from 1976 until 1980. While on Nationwide he also carried out major investigations into council corruption in South Wales and protection rackets in Northern Ireland. He also compèred a number of one-off light entertainment shows for the BBC, including the Miss United Kingdom beauty pageant in 1976 and in 1977, in addition to also presenting the Miss England pageant in 1977.

From 1980 until 1983, he was a correspondent on the BBC's Panorama and Newsnight programmes, reporting from trouble spots such as the Middle East and El Salvador before working for three months as Newsnight's correspondent in Argentina during the Falklands War. From 1983 to 1985, he worked at TV-am as a reporter and as a presenter of Good Morning Britain. In 1986, Stapleton rejoined the BBC, where he presented the regional news programme London Plus until 1987, and the BBC One peak-time consumer programme Watchdog, alongside his wife until 1993. He was also a presenter for the BBC's Breakfast Time from 1988 to 1989, as the programme transitioned to a news focus format.

In 1993, Stapleton returned to ITV to front the live morning talk show The Time, The Place, and for four years he presented the ITV Sunday morning programme My Favourite Hymns, in which he interviewed a wide variety of guests about their faith and its impact on their lives. Archbishop Desmond Tutu, Earl Spencer, Princess Michael of Kent, the former South African president F.W. De Klerk, the author Maya Angelou and Coronation Street's William Roache were amongst his many guests.

In 1998, Stapleton joined the ITV breakfast programme GMTV as a presenter of the Newshour. In 1997, Stapleton, along with Sir Trevor McDonald, presented the live and controversial Monarchy debate for ITV in front of three thousand people at Birmingham's National Exhibition Centre and at GMTV; he also anchored many major news stories. Among them, the war in Kosovo when he was based on the Albanian border covering the refugee crisis. This was followed by his anchoring four American elections, the Boxing Day 2004 tsunami in South East Asia, Pope John Paul II's funeral in Rome and Hurricane Katrina in New Orleans.

In 2003, he appeared on a celebrity edition in Series 13 of Who Wants To Be A Millionaire alongside GMTV colleague Lorraine Kelly. The episode was aired on 19 April 2003, where they won £8,000 for charity.

In 2004, he was named the Royal Television Society's News Presenter of the Year – largely for his work on GMTV covering the 2003 war in Iraq and interviews he conducted with political party leaders including the then Prime Minister Tony Blair. He returned to Iraq to front two special programmes for GMTV commemorating the fifth anniversary of the war. He was also a reporter for the prime time ITV Tonight programme. Stapleton over the years also presented many regional news and current affairs programmes including the BBC's London Plus, Facing South for Meridian and Central Weekend Live for Central TV.

Stapleton interviewed many British Prime Ministers beginning with James Callaghan in the 1970s and was one of the contributors to the BBC series Grumpy Old Men. He presented three political discussion programmes, ITV Central, The Lobby, transmitted in the Midlands, Last Orders for ITV Yorkshire and the London Debate transmitted in London and the South East.

In 2010, he joined the newly established ITV Breakfast programme Daybreak as their Special Correspondent. During his time with the programme, Stapleton was also a part-time presenter. In 2014, it was announced that Daybreak was to come to an end after four years of broadcasting. It would be replaced by a new breakfast programme Good Morning Britain where he remained until July 2015. He worked in radio, standing in for other presenters on LBC, facilitated conferences and wrote for newspapers.

== Personal life and death ==
Stapleton met his then teacher wife Lynn Faulds Wood in 1971 while she was working in her second job as a barmaid in a Richmond public house. They lived in St Margarets and were married for 43 years until her death in 2020 from a stroke aged 72. The couple had a son, Nick, born in 1987, who works as a documentary producer and is best known for being part of the team on BBC One's Scam Interceptors.

He had only one kidney that functioned properly. In April 2008 he revealed in a report for the BBC's The One Show that when he was younger he suffered from the eating disorder anorexia nervosa.

Stapleton was a supporter of Manchester City for more than 60 years, ever since his father took him to see Stanley Matthews play for Blackpool against City at their old Maine Road ground in the 1950s.

In October 2024 Stapleton announced that he had been diagnosed with Parkinson's disease, having made a Radio 4 Appeal for the Parkinson's Disease Society in 2009. As part of the 2009 campaign, Stapleton—along with Jane Asher and Jeremy Paxman—pledged to donate his brain to Parkinson's research following his death. Stapleton's mother had died of Parkinson's.

He died in hospital on 21 September 2025, aged 79, following complications from pneumonia related to his condition.

Awards
Preceded by Jon Snow	RTS: Television Journalism; Presenter of the Year; 2003	Succeeded by Alastair Stewart
