= Charlotte Owen, Baroness Owen of Alderley Edge =

British life peer (born 1993)

The Right Honourable The Baroness Owen of Alderley Edge
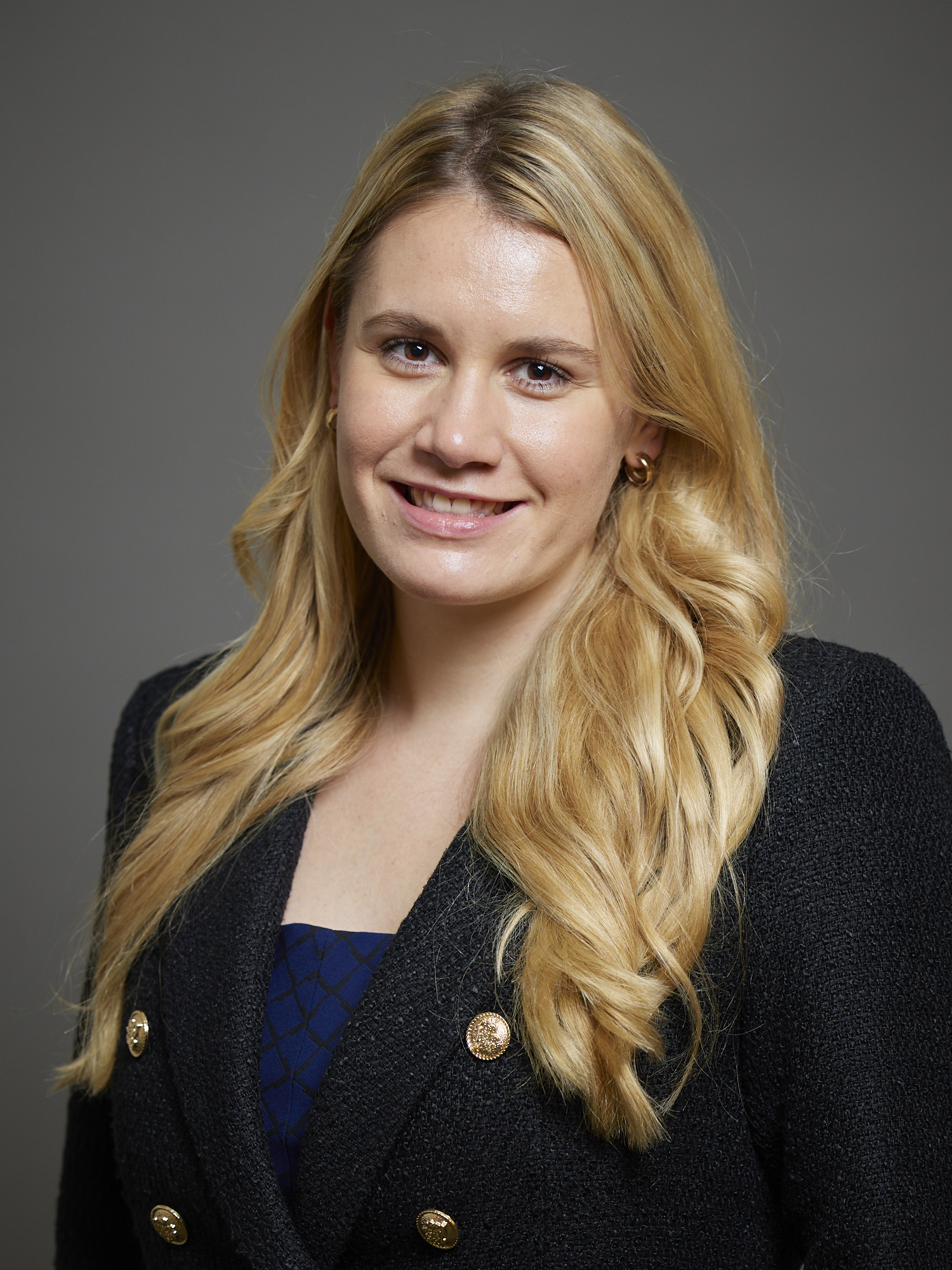
- Official portrait, 2023

Member of the House of Lords
- Lord Temporal
- Life peerage 12 July 2023

Personal details
- Born: Charlotte Kathryn Tranter Owen; 10 May 1993 (age 33)
- Party: Conservative
- Education: University of York
- Occupation: Special adviser

Charlotte Kathryn Tranter Owen, Baroness Owen of Alderley Edge (born 10 May 1993) is a British life peer and former special adviser. She has been a Conservative member of the House of Lords since 2023, and was the youngest recipient of a life peerage at the time of her appointment.

== Early life and education ==
Charlotte Owen was born on 10 May 1993 to Michael and Kathryn Owen. Owen's mother works for her brother's forklift truck company. Owen grew up in Alderley Edge, Cheshire, and attended Alderley Edge School for Girls, a private school. She graduated from the University of York in 2015 with an upper-second-class honours degree in politics and international relations.

According to her LinkedIn profile, Owen worked as an intern for Chancellor of the Exchequer George Osborne for a month in 2011 before later working in his constituency office in Tatton in 2012. Both assertions were disputed by a senior source who worked in Osborne's office at the time. She was a member of Conservative Future and the local Conservative Association.

== Career ==
In 2015, Owen worked for a month in Brussels for Jacqueline Foster, the deputy leader of the Conservatives in the European Parliament. She then worked as an intern for strategic communications consultancy Portland Communications for four months in 2016, before working as a constituency intern for Tory MP William Wragg in January 2017. Later that year, Owen worked as a parliamentary intern to Boris Johnson for six months, before becoming a parliamentary assistant to Alok Sharma for seven months.

Owen was then a senior parliamentary assistant to Jake Berry and Johnson for 21 months, before working exclusively for Johnson for 14 months afterwards. In February 2021, she reportedly became a special adviser to Johnson within the Number 10 Policy Unit. She was retained in this role following the formation of the Truss ministry in September 2022. Under the Truss government, Owen's role was split evenly between Prime Minister Liz Truss and the chief whip and parliamentary secretary to the Treasury, Wendy Morton. She was not retained in her post by Truss's successor, Rishi Sunak, following his appointment as Prime Minister in October 2022.

The accuracy of her stated career history has been disputed, with some asserting that Owen exaggerated both the seniority of her position and the duration that she worked in 10 Downing Street. It has been asserted that she never worked in the Policy Unit. On her LinkedIn profile, Owen stated that she was a special adviser from February 2021 to October 2022, but she was not listed in the annual report on special advisers published in June 2021, though she was in the June 2022 report. In the honours list announcing her life peerage, she was described as "Former Special Adviser to the former Prime Minister Rt Hon Boris Johnson MP". Commenting on Owen's career to date, Liz Bates of Sky News said it was "not an illustrious political career by any stretch". Owen's assertion that she interned for George Osborne while he was chancellor in David Cameron's cabinet has also been challenged. Senior sources who worked in Osborne's Tatton Street office reject it, stating rather that she was simply a member of the local party association and part of Conservative Future, a forerunner to the Young Conservatives.

In September 2024, Owen was appointed vice-president of the environmental consultancy firm chaired by Boris Johnson named Better Earth.

=== House of Lords ===
On 9 June 2023, it was announced that Owen would receive a life peerage in Johnson's resignation honours. The decision was criticised, as Owen was perceived to be inexperienced and not to have contributed significantly to British politics or society. Two former 10 Downing Street members of staff told Tortoise Media that her appointment to the peerage was "completely staggering – her peerage is one of the most strange and hardest to explain because she was so extraordinarily junior". A Whitehall source said that she was the "most egregious" on Johnson's list of peerages. The source described her appointment as "impossible to defend, even as somebody who broadly thinks the current peerage system is right".

On 12 July 2023, Owen was created Baroness Owen of Alderley Edge, of Alderley Edge in the County of Cheshire. She sits in the House of Lords as a Conservative peer. Her appointment, at the age of 30, made her the youngest member of the House of Lords. She was the youngest person ever to receive a life peerage until Carmen Smith, Baroness Smith of Llanfaes, was appointed at the age of 27 in 2024. Owen was introduced to the Lords on 24 July 2023. She made her maiden speech on 14 November 2023, and said she wanted to use her time in the Lords to scrutinise legislation on new technologies.

In January 2025 the reasons cited for nominating Owen to membership of the House of Lords was released by the House of Lords appointments commission following an 18 month Freedom of Information Act 2000 campaign by Martin Rosenbaum.
