= Muehl Public Library =

Coordinates: 44.51583°N 88.32955°W

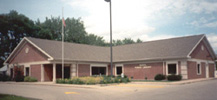
- Location: 436 N. Main Street; Seymour, Wisconsin, United States
- Type: Public
- Established: 1901
- Branch of: Outagamie Waupaca Library System

Collection
- Size: 30,000

Other information
- Website: www.muehlpubliclibrary.org

The Muehl Public Library is located in the city of Seymour, Wisconsin in Outagamie County.

The library is a member of the Outagamie Waupaca Library System (OWLS), which is allied with the Nicolet Federated Library System (NFLS). Both library systems share a common computer network and catalog, at http://www.infosoup.org

The Muehl Public Library has 6,688 sq ft (621.3 m^{2}) of floor space, and over 30,000 items in its collection. The library was originally established in 1901. In 1956 it was relocated to 308 South Main Street. The current building was erected in 1994.

== History ==
In 1901, Mrs. John Stewart, Mrs. Elmer Dean, Mrs. S. G. McCord, and Miss Lotta Griffith collected books and applied to the City Council and the Wisconsin State Library Board to create Seymour's first public library. On December 21 of 1901, the library's first books were checked out in the living room of Mrs. Barton Moss on Main Street. The Fred Rex store is said to have served as the town's first library, until the two rooms above the Seymour State Bank became the library's location. The library was staffed by volunteers until the city hired Miss Cora Lampson as Seymour's first official librarian. She served until June 11, 1911. In its first three months, the Seymour public library's collection grew to 476 volumes. They had 284 borrowers, and by June 10, 1902, they had a circulation of 2,676. Within a few years, the library outgrew its location, and moved to a room upstairs in the City Hall.

The Muehl Public Library was named after Harvey P. Muehl and his family. His grandfather, Frederick Muehl, came to Seymour in 1866. The family home he built is currently the oldest standing building in the city. His son, Phillip Muehl, started a successful furniture store in Seymour. Harvey Muehl, Phillip's son, gave the city funds to purchase a modern house on South Main Street on the site where his father's furniture store once stood. This site was to be the new location of the local library in 1955. He also donated funds toward the operation of the library. Part of those funds contributed to the building of the current library building in 1994 at 436 North Main Street.

The Muehl Public library is currently led by Elizabeth Timmins, who was chosen as the 2016 WLA/Demco Librarian of the Year. The library holds an annual book sale in November.
