= Music 4 =

Music4
- Industry: Music Production; Music Publishing
- Predecessor: Vibe Music Imaging
- Founded: 1997; 28 years ago
- Headquarters: London, United Kingdom
- Website: www.music4.com

Music4 is a creator of custom music for media and production libraries. It has worked with many TV and radio stations in the United Kingdom, including BBC Radio 1 and ITV. The company produced the majority of the jingles for the Chris Moyles show on Radio 1 which attracted over eight million listeners every morning.

== History ==
In 1997, Vibe Music Imaging was formed to produce audio branding for radio stations. In 2003, the company changed their name to Music4 and established hi-end studio facilities in central London. In 2013, the Music4 Studios in Berners Street, London W1 were sold, enabling the business to concentrate on its music publishing interests.

== Work ==
=== Television music ===
The company has produced theme tunes and backing music for many TV shows including The One Show, Watchdog Test House and Watchdog for BBC One, The Alan Titchmarsh Show, It'll Be Alright on the Night and An Audience with The Spice Girls for ITV and Wordplay for Channel 5.

=== Radio jingles ===
As well as being heavily associated with The Chris Moyles Show, Music4 has made jingles for Real Radio, SPIN South West, Wave 105, Absolute Radio and Magic 105.4.

Music4 has performed extensive work for BBC Radio 1 over the years; it produced the music imaging for BBC Radio 1's Newsbeat bulletins and programmes between the years 2000 and 2009, with the exception of 2003 and 2004. It produced the full station imaging packages for Radio 1 in the years 1998–2002, the imaging for The Official Chart Show in 1999, 2005, 2006 and 2012, and the 1tros (custom power intros) between 2008 and 2010.

It prepared full station imaging packages for various BBC Local Radio stations including BBC London, BBC Three Counties Radio, BBC Radio Newcastle, BBC Tees, BBC Radio Devon and BBC Radio Cambridgeshire.

In 2015, Music4 were again invited to compose the themes for the new Chris Moyles Show on Radio X which first aired in September that year.

=== Production music ===
Music4 has been involved in creating several production music libraries over the years. V - The Production Library was started in 2001, and was used extensively by BBC Radio 1. It was sold to Warner/Chappell in 2009.

Plan 8 Music is a joint project between Music4 and Barry Blue.

=== Released tracks ===
The company took this partnership with BBC Radio 1 further by releasing the Chris Moyles' World Cup Song, a parody on traditional World Cup songs supporting the England team.
