= The Time, The Place =

- The Time, The Place logo.
- Presented by: Mike Scott; John Stapleton
- Country of origin: United Kingdom
- Original language: English

Production
- Executive producer: Bob Cousins
- Production location: Various Locations
- Editor: Peter McHugh
- Production companies: TVS; Thames Television; Central Independent Television; Anglia Television; Ulster Television; Scottish Television

Original release
- Network: ITV
- Release: 7 September 1987 – 20 March 1998

The Time, The Place is a British audience participation talk show that was produced by a number of different ITV companies, and broadcast live on ITV from 1987 to 1998. TTTP was presented by Mike Scott from 1987 to 1993 and by John Stapleton from 1991 to 1998. Henry Kelly also presented the programme for a period before Stapleton took over full time.

== Format ==
The programme was developed as ITV's competition to the BBC's Kilroy morning discussion show which premiered in 1986. It differed from Kilroy in that Kilroy delved into more political and current-events-related issues, while TTTP focused on human interest topics.

The programme toured the country and came from the various ITV regional studios, including Aberdeen after the Piper Alpha disaster. Towards the end of its run, the programme came from London at least three days a week to save money. It ended on 20 March 1998, to make way for the less topical, more issue-led programme Vanessa, which mainly dealt with personal matters.
