= Alderley Edge School for Girls =

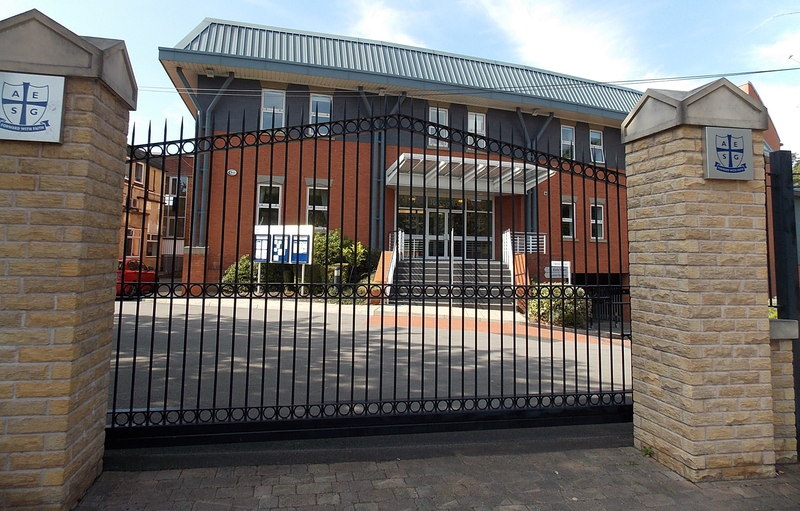
- Entrance to the school in 2014

Location
- Wilmslow Road; Alderley Edge, Cheshire, SK9 7QE; England; 53.3051°N 2.2385°W

Information
- Type: Girls' independent selective
- Motto: Aspire to be More
- Religious affiliation: Christian
- Established: 1999
- Closed: 26 June 2026
- Headmistress: Caroline Wood (2024)
- Gender: Girls
- Age: 2 to 18
- Enrolment: 377 (2025)
- Houses: St. Joan, St Emilie, St Francis, St Hilary
- Website: www.aesg.co.uk

Alderley Edge School for Girls was a Christian independent day school for girls in Alderley Edge, Cheshire, England. It was on a five-and-a-half acre site in the centre of the village.

The school catered for pupils aged two to nineteen, providing both secondary and primary school education, as well as a nursery and sixth form. It was a member of the Girls' Schools Association and was an accredited Apple Distinguished School and an Apple Regional Training Centre.

The board of governors announced in February 2026 that the school would close at the end of the 2025–26 academic year due to financial issues, a committee of parents explored ways to keep it open.

The School closed on 26 June 2026.

== History ==
Alderley Edge School for Girls was founded in 1999 from a merger of a Catholic and an Anglican school, Mount Carmel and St Hilary's. St Hilary's School was founded in 1876 as Alderley Edge High School for Girls, changed its name to St Hilary's in the early 20th century and became part of the Woodard Corporation in 1955. The Sisters of St Joseph founded Mount Carmel School in 1945. Alderley Edge School was a Christian school and represented both churches, but admitted girls of any religion.

In February 2026, the board of governors announced that the school would close at the end of the 2025–26 academic year, with 7 July 2026 being the planned final day. The school had been in financial difficulty, and enrolment declined in anticipation of the imposition of VAT on private school fees. A group of 250 parents submitted a plan to leverage the school's property to provide the necessary funds for it to survive, the plan was rejected by the governors of the school.

The school closed on 26 June 2026.

== Notable alumni ==
- Michelle Ackerley, TV presenter – attended Mount Carmel
- Charlotte Owen, Baroness Owen of Alderley Edge, life peer
