= Sophie Raworth =

English journalist, newsreader and broadcaster (born 1968)

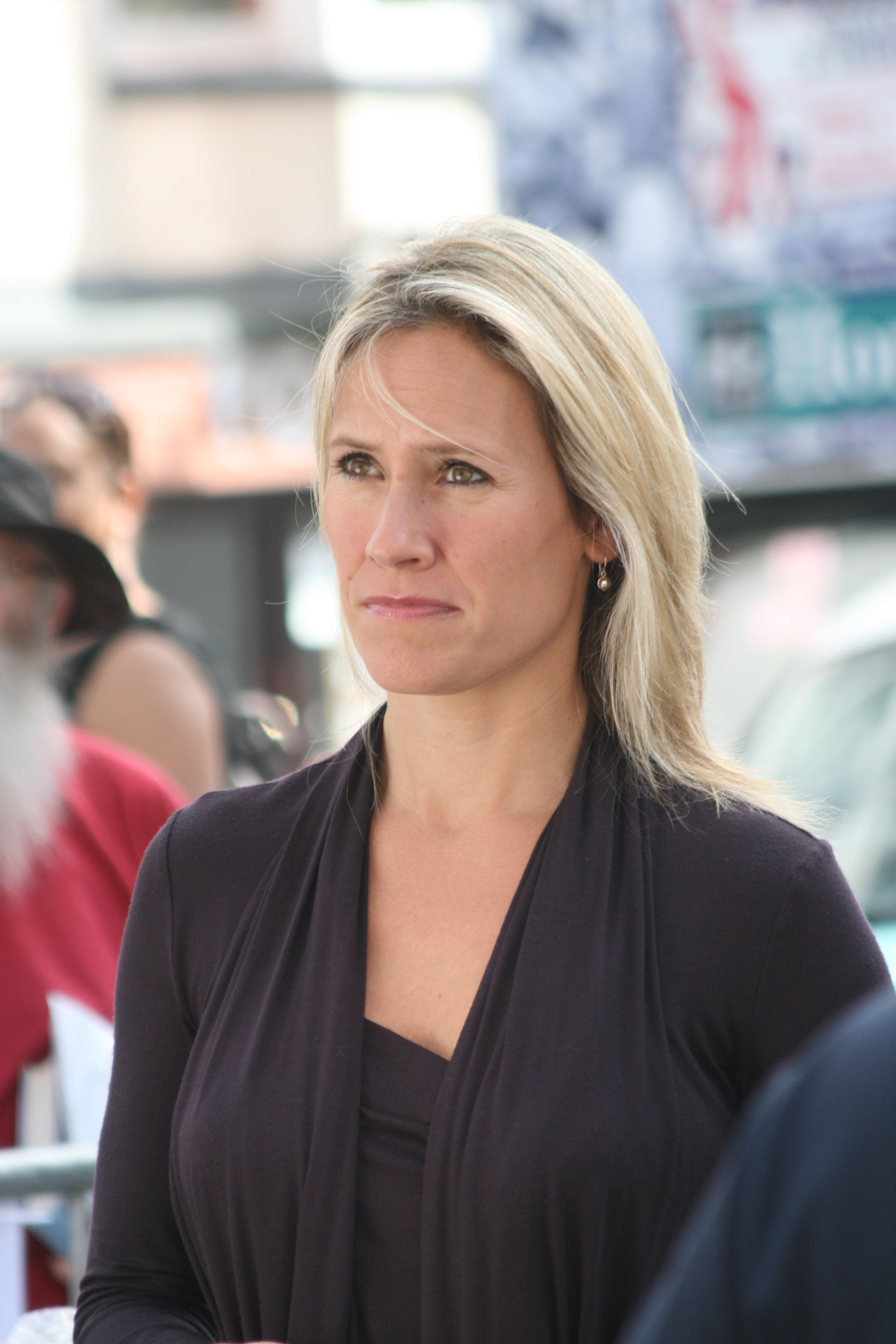
- Raworth in Brighton in 2009
- Born: Sophie Jane Raworth; 15 May 1968 (age 58); Redhill, Surrey, England
- Education: Bute House Preparatory School for Girls; Putney High School; St Paul's Girls' School
- Alma mater: University of Manchester (BA); City, University of London (PGDip)
- Occupations: Journalist, presenter, newsreader
- Years active: 1992–present
- Employer: BBC
- Notable credit(s): BBC News at One; BBC News at Six; BBC News at Ten; The Andrew Marr Show; Election Night; Watchdog; Crimewatch
- Spouse: Richard Winter (m. 2003)
- Children: 3
- Relatives: Kate Raworth (sister); Roman Krznaric (brother-in-law)

Sophie Jane Raworth (/ˈreɪwɜːrθ/; born 15 May 1968) is an English journalist, newsreader and broadcaster working for the BBC. She is a senior newsreader and is one of the main presenters of BBC News (mainly BBC News at Six and BBC News at Ten). She has been a television presenter for state occasions and has also presented the BBC's Election Night coverage, alongside other presenters.

In 2015, she became the new presenter of consumer affairs programme Watchdog and in 2016, began presenting Crimewatch, both for BBC One.

== Early life and education ==
Sophie Jane Raworth was born on 15 May 1968 in Redhill, Surrey to a florist mother and a businessman father. She grew up in Twickenham and was privately educated at Bute House Preparatory School for Girls, Putney High School and St Paul's Girls' School.

Raworth undertook a joint honours degree in French and German at the University of Manchester, graduating with an upper second-class honours degree in 1991. She then spent a year teaching English to teenagers in Toulouse before completing a postgraduate diploma in broadcast journalism at City, University of London.

== Career ==
Raworth joined the BBC in 1992 as a news reporter, first for Greater Manchester Radio and then, in April 1994, as BBC Regions correspondent in Brussels. In May 1995, she became the regular joint presenter of BBC's Look North programme in Leeds.

Raworth moved to national television in 1997, to co-present the BBC's Breakfast News programme on BBC One, initially with Justin Webb, and in later years, with John Nicolson.

Raworth then joined the BBC's early morning news programme Breakfast at its launch in 2000, which she presented alongside Jeremy Bowen and in later years, Dermot Murnaghan, on Monday–Thursdays, and sometimes with regular relief presenters such as Bill Turnbull and Michael Peschardt. She then moved to the BBC Six O'Clock News in January 2003 which she presented alongside George Alagiah; she was a presenter on this bulletin until October 2005 when she went on maternity leave, and was replaced by Natasha Kaplinsky.

In March 2006, Raworth was named as the main presenter of the BBC News at One, replacing Anna Ford on Monday–Thursdays. She took up the position in June 2006 after returning from maternity leave.

Raworth has presented several BBC specials, including coverage of the Queen's Golden Jubilee and Our Monarchy – the Next 50 Years, both alongside David Dimbleby. In addition, she has appeared on Tomorrow's World and, in the early 2000s, entertainment programmes such as Dream Lives and the quiz show Judgemental.

In 2004, Raworth appeared on the BBC fashion show What Not to Wear, in which she was given a makeover by style advisors Trinny Woodall and Susannah Constantine. In 2006 she was part of the television coverage of the Children's Party at the Palace, an event to celebrate the Queen's 80th birthday. Along with Huw Edwards, she presented some fake news updates for the programme, which led to many complaints from viewers. Raworth had a cameo role in the mid-2000s as a newsreader in the last series of the BBC comedy series My Hero.

At the end of the One O'Clock News on 31 January 2008, she announced that she would be leaving the programme until the summer, and confirmed Kate Silverton as presenting the bulletin during her absence. Raworth returned on 25 August 2008, after the birth of her third child, with the presentation of the Bank Holiday editions of the BBC News at One, BBC News at Six and BBC News at Ten.

From early 2009, Raworth was the main relief presenter on the BBC News at Six and a regular relief presenter on the BBC News at Ten, often presenting when regular presenters Huw Edwards and Fiona Bruce were not available. She also appeared in place of Andrew Marr on The Andrew Marr Show, and presented on the BBC News Channel (formerly known as BBC News 24).

In May 2009, she presented The Trouble with Working Women with reporter and father-of-three Justin Rowlatt on the BBC. The programme looked at the role of the working woman. In 2009, she presented Crimewatch Roadshow on BBC One on weekday mornings.

In 2013, Raworth had a cameo appearance at the start of the film A Good Day to Die Hard as herself.

On 16 July 2013, Raworth was given an Award of Doctor of Arts honoris causa by City University London.

Raworth presented Watchdog Daily in 2012 and Watchdog Test House in 2014 and 2015, before landing the role of main presenter on Watchdog in September 2015. She replaced Anne Robinson as presenter of Watchdog.

In February 2016, Raworth replaced Kirsty Young as the main anchor of Crimewatch. She previously guest presented the programme in 2012.

In 2018, to celebrate the 100th anniversary of the Royal Air Force, Raworth presented a documentary called RAF 100: Into the Blue, where she talked about her grandfather, Captain Edwin Raworth, who was a pilot in the First World War.

From 9 January 2022 to July 2022, Sophie Raworth was the interim presenter on BBC's Sunday Morning, temporarily replacing Andrew Marr as host. In September 2022, former BBC News Political Editor Laura Kuenssberg began presenting Sunday with Laura Kuenssberg which replaced Sunday Morning in the timeslot on BBC One.

On 23 April 2026, Raworth's book Running on Air: From BBC Headlines to Life-Changing Finish Lines was published. The book focuses on her career at the BBC and how she started running in her early 40s, and onto competing in some of the most demanding races, including the 150-mile Marathon des Sables.

== Television and film appearances ==
=== Television ===
- Breakfast (2000–2002) – Presenter
- BBC Nine O'Clock News (1999–2000) – Newscaster
- BBC News at Six (2003–present) – Newscaster
- BBC News at One (2006–2020) – Newscaster
- Crimewatch Roadshow (2009) – Presenter
- Remembrance Sunday: The Cenotaph (2009–present) – Reporter
- How to Beat Tough Times: Money Watch (2010) - Co-presenter
- Watchdog Daily (2012) – Presenter
- Doctor Who (2013) – Cameo, herself
- Crimewatch (2012, 2016) – Guest presenter
- The Andrew Marr Show (2013) – Guest presenter
- Watchdog Test House (2014–2015) – Co-presenter
- Chelsea Flower Show (2014–present) – Presenter
- Watchdog (2015–2016) – Presenter
- Bodyguard (2018) – Cameo, herself
- The Funeral of HRH The Prince Philip, Duke of Edinburgh (2021) – Reporter
- Sunday Morning (2022–2022) – Presenter
- Our Next Prime Minister (2022) – Presenter
- The Proclamation of HM the King (2022) – Presenter
- Scotland: The Vigil (2022) – Presenter
- HM the Queen: The Journey to London (2022) – Presenter
- HM the Queen: The Procession to Lying in state (2022) – Reporter
- Coronation of His Majesty The King and Her Majesty The Queen Consort (2023) – Reporter
- Election 2024: The Results (2024) – Co-presenter
- VE Day 80: The Nation Pays Tribute (2025) – Presenter
- VE Day 80: The Nation Remembers (2025) – Presenter
- 2026 United Kingdom local elections BBC One coverage (2026) – Presenter

=== Film ===
- A Good Day to Die Hard (2013) – Cameo, herself
- Absolutely Fabulous: The Movie (2016) – Cameo, herself

== Personal life ==
Raworth married estate agent Richard Winter on 13 December 2003, after he proposed to her on holiday on the Amalfi Coast on her 35th birthday. They live in Fulham, London, and have two daughters and one son. Her younger sister, Kate Raworth, is an English economist.

=== Genealogy ===
In March 2017, the genealogy programme Who Do You Think You Are? on BBC television featured Raworth's family story. It revealed that she was descended from non-conformist ancestors who were members of the New Jerusalem Church. They lived in Birmingham at a time when the city suffered religious riots in 1791 with people such as her ancestors being the targets. In the aftermath of the riots, Raworth's ancestors, William and Martha Mott, took a great risk by uprooting their young family to move to North America. However, within two years of arriving, the parents had died of yellow fever and the children were sent back to England.

Raworth discovered in the programme that she was not descended from noted piano maker Henry Isaac Robert Mott (Note: The Mott family business was successful and in 1817 Robert Mott patented a sostenente piano.) as the family had believed, but from his cousin, Samuel Mott, who was dismissed from the piano company and ended up taking his own life.

=== Running ===
On 17 April 2011, Raworth completed the London Marathon, despite collapsing two miles from the finish line. By 2017, she had completed all six World Marathon Majors.

In April 2018, Raworth completed the Marathon des Sables, a six-day, 251 km (156 mi) ultramarathon in the Sahara Desert.

In October 2022, Raworth completed her 10th London Marathon. In April 2023, Raworth again completed the London Marathon.

At the 2024 London Marathon, Raworth fractured her ankle but the diagnosis did not come till the D-Day 80th anniversary celebrations. Raworth was forced to pull out of the 2024 United Kingdom general election debate. Raworth said "The injury I picked up at the London marathon has now been diagnosed as a fracture in my ankle. I was only told this last week during the D-Day commemorations. I’m now on crutches, in a boot and non-weight-bearing for some time." After recovering from her ankle injury, Raworth completed her 13th London Marathon in April 2026.

Media offices
Preceded by Huw Edwards	Main presenter & Friday alt presenter of BBC News at Six; Served alongside: George Alagiah (2003–2005 & 2019–present)	Succeeded by Natasha Kaplinsky
Preceded by Anna Ford	Main presenter of BBC News at One; 2006 – present	Incumbent
Preceded by None	Main presenter of Crimewatch Roadshow; 2009	Succeeded by Ginny Buckley
