= Michelle Ackerley =

English television presenter and journalist (born 1984)

- Born: Michelle Ayele Ackerley; 21 July 1984 (age 42); Manchester, England, UK
- Education: Alderley Edge School for Girls; University of Manchester (BSc)
- Occupations: Television presenter, journalist
- Years active: 2011–present
- Employer: BBC
- Television: All Over the Place; Watchdog; Crimewatch Roadshow; The One Show; Art Ninja; World’s Strongest Man
- Spouse: Ben Ryan (m. 2024)
- Children: 1

Michelle Ayele Ackerley (born 21 July 1984) is an English television presenter and journalist, best known for her work on programmes such as Watchdog, World’s Strongest Man and The One Show.

== Early life ==
Ackerley grew up in Manchester. Her maternal grandfather was a chief of the Ga people in Ghana. Ackerley was educated at Alderley Edge School for Girls where she was Deputy Head Girl during her final year. She graduated from the University of Manchester with a degree in psychology.

== Career ==
Ackerley gained radio experience at All FM 96.9 radio in Manchester and joined the BBC in 2005 as a programme maker. She has co-presented the CBBC series All Over the Place since 2013. In 2013, she occasionally presented "The Hub" section on This Morning.

In 2015 and 2016, she co-presented the BBC One consumer affairs programme Watchdog. She co-presented the second series of Watchdog Test House.

She has been a reporter for the BBC's Crimewatch Roadshow since 2015.

Ackerley presented the second, third and fourth series of Council House Crackdown from 2016 to 2018. She has presented reports for the BBC's Inside Out. She was a contestant in an episode of Celebrity Mastermind in December 2016.

Since 2016, Ackerley has guest presented episodes of the nightly magazine show The One Show.

Ackerley has also co-hosted Totally Rubbish, I Want My Own Room and Deadly Art for CBBC. She also stars in the CBBC art series, Art Ninja. In January 2018, she participated in an episode of And They're Off! in aid of Sport Relief. Also in 2018, she appeared in Celebrity Masterchef. Since 2018, she has presented Fantasy Homes by the Sea. In August 2020, she featured as a lead presenter on ITV's Loose Women for two episodes.

== Personal life ==
In May 2024, Ackerley married her fiancé Ben Ryan. On 6 May 2025, Ackerley revealed on Morning Live that she is four months pregnant. On 14 October 2025, Ackerley gave birth to daughter Nala.

== Filmography ==
Television

Year	Title	Role	Channel
2011	I Want My Own Room	Expert	CBBC
2012	Deadly Art	Presenter	CBBC
2013	This Morning	Hub presenter	ITV
2013–2017	All Over the Place	Presenter	CBBC
2014	Totally Rubbish	Co-host	CBBC
2015	The Dog Ate My Homework	Guest	CBBC
2015	Watchdog Test House	Co-presenter	BBC One
2015–2016	Watchdog	Co-presenter	BBC One
2015–2019	Art Ninja		CBBC
2015–	Crimewatch Live	Co-presenter	BBC One
2016	Celebrity Mastermind	Contestant	BBC One
2016	The Big Food Rescue	Narrator	BBC One
2016–	Council House Crackdown	Presenter	BBC One
2016–	The One Show	Presenter/reporter	BBC One
2017	Let's Sing and Dance for Comic Relief	Contestant	BBC One
2017	Len Goodman's Partners in Rhyme	Guest	BBC One
2018	And They're Off! For Sport Relief	Participant	BBC One
2018	Celebrity Masterchef	Contestant	BBC One
2018	2018 World's Strongest Man	Co-presenter	Channel 5
2018	Fantasy Homes by the Sea	Presenter	BBC Living
2019	2019 World's Strongest Man	Co-presenter	Channel 5
2020	Richard Osman's House of Games	Contestant	BBC
2020	Loose Women	Anchor - 2 episodes	ITV
2020	Countdown	Guest - 5 episodes	Channel 4
2020	2020 World's Strongest Man	Co-presenter	Channel 5
2021	2021 World's Strongest Man	Co-presenter	Channel 5
2022	Supermarket Deals: Are They Worth It?	Presenter	Channel 5
2022	Dirty Rotten Sc@mmers	Co-presenter, with her mum Mavis Ackerley	BBC One
2022	Jeremy Vine Extra	Co-presenter	Channel 5
2022-present	Morning Live	Co-presenter	BBC One
2023	What They Really Mean For You	Co-presenter, with Justin Rowlatt and Tara Shine	BBC One
