= The One Show presenter schedule =

List of presenters of BBC's The One Show

This is a list of presenters who have worked on the British television magazine and chat show programme The One Show. Broadcast live on BBC One weekdays at 7:00 pm, it features topical stories and studio guests.

It is currently co-hosted by Alex Jones, Roman Kemp, Ronan Keating and Lauren Laverne. Various reporters also assist with subject-specific presenting, both in the studio and on location, or through filmed segments. Originally produced in Birmingham and then in the BBC Media Village in White City, London, since 2014 the studio has been primarily based in Broadcasting House, the BBC's headquarters in London.

== Presenting schedule ==
Below is the day-to-day presenter line-up ever since the first broadcast in 2006.

Guest presenters are indicated in bold.

=== 2006–2009 ===
2006
Week	Monday	Tuesday	Wednesday	Thursday	Friday
14–18 August	Adrian Chiles; Nadia Sawalha				
21–25 August	Adrian Chiles; Nadia Sawalha				
28 August–1 September	Adrian Chiles; Nadia Sawalha				
4–8 September	Adrian Chiles; Nadia Sawalha				

2007
Week	Monday	Tuesday	Wednesday	Thursday	Friday
9–13 July	Adrian Chiles; Myleene Klass				
16–20 July	Adrian Chiles; Myleene Klass				
23–27 July	Adrian Chiles; Myleene Klass				
30 July–3 August	Adrian Chiles; Myleene Klass				
6–10 August	Adrian Chiles; Christine Bleakley		Adrian Chiles; Myleene Klass		
13–17 August	Adrian Chiles; Myleene Klass			Adrian Chiles; Christine Bleakley	
20–24 August	Adrian Chiles; Christine Bleakley				
27–31 August	Adrian Chiles; Christine Bleakley		Adrian Chiles; **Ellie Harrison**	Adrian Chiles; Christine Bleakley	
3–7 September	Adrian Chiles; Christine Bleakley				
10–14 September	Adrian Chiles; Christine Bleakley				
17–21 September	Adrian Chiles; Christine Bleakley				
24–28 September	Adrian Chiles; Christine Bleakley				
1–5 October	Adrian Chiles; Christine Bleakley				
8–12 October	Adrian Chiles; Christine Bleakley				
15–19 October	Adrian Chiles; Christine Bleakley				
22–26 October	**Dominic Littlewood**; Christine Bleakley				
29 October–2 November	Adrian Chiles; Christine Bleakley				
5–9 November	Adrian Chiles; Christine Bleakley				
12–16 November	Adrian Chiles; Christine Bleakley				**No show** **(Children in Need)**
19–23 November	Adrian Chiles; Christine Bleakley				
26–30 November	Adrian Chiles; Christine Bleakley				
3–7 December	Adrian Chiles; Christine Bleakley				
10–14 December	Adrian Chiles; Christine Bleakley				
17–21 December	Adrian Chiles; Christine Bleakley				

2008
Week	Monday	Tuesday	Wednesday	Thursday	Friday
7–11 January	Adrian Chiles; Christine Bleakley				
14–18 January	Adrian Chiles; Christine Bleakley				
21–25 January	Adrian Chiles; Christine Bleakley				
28 January–1 February	Adrian Chiles; Christine Bleakley				
4–8 February	Adrian Chiles; Christine Bleakley				
11–15 February	Adrian Chiles; Christine Bleakley				
18–22 February	Adrian Chiles; Christine Bleakley				
25–29 February	Adrian Chiles; Christine Bleakley				
3–7 March	Adrian Chiles; Christine Bleakley				
10–14 March	Adrian Chiles; Christine Bleakley				**No Show** **(Sport Relief)**
17–21 March	Adrian Chiles; Christine Bleakley				
24–28 March	Adrian Chiles; Christine Bleakley				
31 March–4 April	Adrian Chiles; Christine Bleakley				
7–11 April	Adrian Chiles; Christine Bleakley		**Dominic Littlewood**; Christine Bleakley	**Dan Snow**; Christine Bleakley	**Colin Jackson**; Christine Bleakley
14–18 April	Adrian Chiles; Christine Bleakley				
21–25 April	Adrian Chiles; Christine Bleakley				
28 April–2 May	Adrian Chiles; Christine Bleakley				
5–9 May	Adrian Chiles; Christine Bleakley				
12–16 May	Adrian Chiles; Christine Bleakley				
19–23 May	Adrian Chiles; Christine Bleakley				
26–30 May	Adrian Chiles; Christine Bleakley				
2–6 June	Adrian Chiles; Christine Bleakley				
9–13 June	**No shows** **(MOTD Live - Euro 2008** **& BBC News)**		Adrian Chiles; Christine Bleakley	**Dan Snow**; Christine Bleakley	Adrian Chiles; Christine Bleakley
16–20 June	Adrian Chiles; Christine Bleakley	**Nicky Campbell**; Christine Bleakley	**Andrew Neil**; Christine Bleakley		Adrian Chiles; Christine Bleakley
23–27 June	Adrian Chiles; Christine Bleakley		**Matthew Wright**; Christine Bleakley	Adrian Chiles; Christine Bleakley	
30 June–4 July	Adrian Chiles; Christine Bleakley		**No Show** **(Wimbledon 2008)**	Adrian Chiles; Christine Bleakley	
7–11 July	Adrian Chiles; Christine Bleakley				
14–18 July	Adrian Chiles; Christine Bleakley				
21–25 July	Adrian Chiles; Christine Bleakley				
28 July–1 August	Adrian Chiles; Christine Bleakley				
4–8 August	Adrian Chiles; Christine Bleakley		**Matthew Wright**; Christine Bleakley		**No Show** **(Olympics Opening**; **Ceremony Highlights)**
11–15 August	**No Shows** **(The Games Today)**				
18–22 August	**No Shows** **(The Games Today)**				
25–29 August	**Matthew Wright**; Christine Bleakley	Adrian Chiles; Christine Bleakley			
1–5 September	Adrian Chiles; Christine Bleakley				
8–12 September	Adrian Chiles; Christine Bleakley				
15–19 September	Adrian Chiles; Christine Bleakley				
22–26 September	Adrian Chiles; Christine Bleakley				
29 September–3 October	Adrian Chiles; Christine Bleakley				
6–10 October	Adrian Chiles; Christine Bleakley				
13–17 October	Adrian Chiles; Christine Bleakley				
20–24 October	Adrian Chiles; Christine Bleakley				
27–31 October	Adrian Chiles; Christine Bleakley				
3–7 November	Adrian Chiles; Christine Bleakley				
10–14 November	Adrian Chiles; Christine Bleakley				**No show** **(Children in Need)**
17–21 November	Adrian Chiles; Christine Bleakley				
24–28 November	Adrian Chiles; Christine Bleakley				
1–5 December	Adrian Chiles; Christine Bleakley				
8–12 December	Adrian Chiles; Christine Bleakley				
15–19 December	Adrian Chiles; Christine Bleakley				

2009
Week	Monday	Tuesday	Wednesday	Thursday	Friday
12–16 January	Adrian Chiles; Christine Bleakley				
19–23 January	Adrian Chiles; Christine Bleakley				
26–30 January	Adrian Chiles; Christine Bleakley				
2–6 February	Adrian Chiles; Christine Bleakley				
9–13 February	Adrian Chiles; Christine Bleakley				
16–20 February	Adrian Chiles; Christine Bleakley				
23–27 February	Adrian Chiles; Christine Bleakley				
2–6 March	Adrian Chiles; Christine Bleakley				
9–13 March	Adrian Chiles; Christine Bleakley				**No Show** **(Comic Relief)**
16–20 March	Adrian Chiles; Christine Bleakley				
23–27 March	Adrian Chiles; Christine Bleakley				
30 March–3 April	Adrian Chiles; Christine Bleakley				
6–10 April	Adrian Chiles; Christine Bleakley				
13–17 April	Adrian Chiles; Christine Bleakley				
20–24 April	Adrian Chiles; Christine Bleakley				
27 April–1 May	Adrian Chiles; Christine Bleakley				
4–8 May	Adrian Chiles; Christine Bleakley				
11–15 May	Adrian Chiles; Christine Bleakley				
18–22 May	Adrian Chiles; Christine Bleakley				
25–29 May	**No Show** **(Bank Holiday)**	Adrian Chiles; Christine Bleakley			
1–5 June	Adrian Chiles; Christine Bleakley				
8–12 June	Adrian Chiles; Christine Bleakley				
15–19 June	Adrian Chiles; Christine Bleakley				
22–26 June	Adrian Chiles; Christine Bleakley				
29 June–3 July	Adrian Chiles; Christine Bleakley				
6–10 July	Adrian Chiles; Christine Bleakley				
13–17 July	Adrian Chiles; Christine Bleakley				
20–24 July	Adrian Chiles; Christine Bleakley				
27–31 July	Adrian Chiles; Christine Bleakley				
3–7 August	Adrian Chiles; Christine Bleakley			Adrian Chiles; **Lucy Siegle**	
10–14 August	Adrian Chiles; Christine Bleakley				
17–21 August	**Gethin Jones**; **Gloria Hunniford**				
24–28 August	**John Sergeant**; **Myleene Klass**				
31 August–4 September	**No show: Bank Holiday** **(Military Tattoo)**	Adrian Chiles; Christine Bleakley			
7–11 September	Adrian Chiles; Christine Bleakley				
14–18 September	Adrian Chiles; Christine Bleakley				
21–25 September	Adrian Chiles; Christine Bleakley				
28 September–2 October	Adrian Chiles; Christine Bleakley				
5–9 October	Adrian Chiles; Christine Bleakley			**Gethin Jones**; Christine Bleakley	Adrian Chiles; Christine Bleakley
12–16 October	Adrian Chiles; Christine Bleakley				
19–23 October	Adrian Chiles; Christine Bleakley				
26–30 October	Adrian Chiles; Christine Bleakley				
2–6 November	Adrian Chiles; Christine Bleakley				
9–13 November	Adrian Chiles; Christine Bleakley				
16–20 November	**Nicky Campbell**; **Gabby Logan**			**Matt Baker**; **Gabby Logan**	**No show** **(Children in Need)**
23–27 November	Adrian Chiles; Christine Bleakley				
30 November–4 December	Adrian Chiles; Christine Bleakley				
7–11 December	Adrian Chiles; Christine Bleakley				
14–18 December	Adrian Chiles; Christine Bleakley				
21–25 December	Adrian Chiles; Christine Bleakley			**No Shows** **(Christmas Holidays)**	

=== 2010–2019 ===
2010
Week	Monday	Tuesday	Wednesday	Thursday	Friday
11–15 January	Adrian Chiles; Christine Bleakley				
18–22 January	Adrian Chiles; Christine Bleakley				
25–29 January	Adrian Chiles; Christine Bleakley				
1–5 February	Adrian Chiles; Christine Bleakley				
8–12 February	Adrian Chiles; Christine Bleakley				
15–19 February	Adrian Chiles; Christine Bleakley				
22–26 February	Adrian Chiles; Christine Bleakley				
1–5 March	Adrian Chiles; Christine Bleakley				
8–12 March	Adrian Chiles; Christine Bleakley				
15–19 March	Adrian Chiles; Christine Bleakley				**No Show** **(Sport Relief)**
22–26 March	Adrian Chiles; Christine Bleakley				
29 March–2 April	Adrian Chiles; Christine Bleakley				
5–9 April	Adrian Chiles; Christine Bleakley				
12–16 April	**Chris Hollins**; **Louise Minchin**				
19–23 April	Adrian Chiles; Christine Bleakley				
26–30 April	Adrian Chiles; Christine Bleakley				
3–7 May	**No Show** **(Bank Holiday)**	**Matt Allwright**; Christine Bleakley		**Paul Merton**; Christine Bleakley	**Matt Allwright**; Christine Bleakley
10–14 May	**Matt Allwright**; Christine Bleakley			**Paul Merton**; Christine Bleakley	**Matt Allwright**; Christine Bleakley
17–21 May	**Matt Baker**; Christine Bleakley				
24–28 May	**Matt Baker**; Christine Bleakley				
31 May–4 June	**Matt Allwright**; Christine Bleakley			**Matt Baker**; Christine Bleakley	**Matt Allwright**; Christine Bleakley
7–11 June	**Matt Allwright**; Christine Bleakley				**No Show** **(MOTD Live - 2010 World Cup)**
14–18 June	**No shows** **(Summer Break was during the 2010 World Cup period)**				
21–25 June	**No shows** **(Summer Break was during the 2010 World Cup period)**				
28 June–2 July	**No shows** **(Summer Break was during the 2010 World Cup period)**				
5–9 July	**No shows** **(Summer Break was during the 2010 World Cup period)**				
12–16 July	**Matt Baker**; **Louise Minchin**				**Matt Allwright**; **Louise Minchin**
19–23 July	**Matt Allwright**; **Louise Minchin**	**Matt Baker**; **Louise Minchin**			
26–30 July	**Matt Baker**; **Gabby Logan**				
2–6 August	**Matt Baker**; **Gabby Logan**				
9–13 August	**Matt Baker**; **Gabby Logan**				
16–20 August	Jason Manford; Alex Jones				Chris Evans; Alex Jones
23–27 August	Jason Manford; Alex Jones				Chris Evans; Alex Jones
30 August–3 September	Jason Manford; Alex Jones				Chris Evans; Alex Jones
6–10 September	Jason Manford; Alex Jones		**Alexander Armstrong**; Alex Jones	Jason Manford; Alex Jones	Chris Evans; Alex Jones
13–17 September	Jason Manford; Alex Jones			**Matt Baker**; Alex Jones	Chris Evans; Alex Jones
20–24 September	Jason Manford; Alex Jones			**Matt Baker**; Alex Jones	Chris Evans; Alex Jones
27 September–1 October	Jason Manford; Alex Jones			**Matt Baker**; Alex Jones	Chris Evans; Alex Jones
4–8 October	Jason Manford; Alex Jones				**Matt Baker**; Alex Jones
11–15 October	Jason Manford; Alex Jones				Chris Evans; Alex Jones
18–22 October	Jason Manford; Alex Jones			Chris Evans; Alex Jones	
25–29 October	Chris Evans; Alex Jones	Jason Manford; Alex Jones			Chris Evans; Alex Jones
1–5 November	Jason Manford; Alex Jones				Chris Evans; Alex Jones
8–12 November	Jason Manford; Alex Jones	**Matt Baker**; Alex Jones			Chris Evans; Alex Jones
15–19 November	Jason Manford; Alex Jones			Chris Evans; Alex Jones	**No show** **(Children in Need)**
22–26 November	**Matt Baker**; Alex Jones			Chris Evans; Alex Jones	
29 November–3 December	**Matt Allwright**; Alex Jones	**Matt Allwright**; **Gabby Logan**	**Matt Allwright**; **Louise Minchin**	Chris Evans; **Louise Minchin**	Chris Evans; Alex Jones
6–10 December	**Matt Baker**; **Louise Minchin**		Chris Evans; Alex Jones		
13–17 December	Chris Evans; Alex Jones				

2011
Week	Monday	Tuesday	Wednesday	Thursday	Friday
10–14 January	**Matt Allwright**; Alex Jones		**Alexander Armstrong**; Alex Jones		
17–21 January	**Matt Allwright**; Alex Jones		**Alexander Armstrong**; Alex Jones	Chris Evans; Alex Jones	
24–28 January	**Matt Allwright**; Alex Jones		**Alexander Armstrong**; Alex Jones	Chris Evans; Alex Jones	
31 January–4 February	**Matt Allwright**; Alex Jones		**Alexander Armstrong**; Alex Jones	Chris Evans; Alex Jones	
7–11 February	**Matt Allwright**; **Louise Minchin**		**Alexander Armstrong**; **Louise Minchin**	Chris Evans; **Louise Minchin**	
14–18 February	Matt Baker; Alex Jones				Chris Evans; Alex Jones
21–25 February	Matt Baker; Alex Jones				Chris Evans; Alex Jones
28 February–4 March	Matt Baker; Alex Jones		**Alexander Armstrong**; Alex Jones		Chris Evans; Alex Jones
7–11 March	Matt Baker; Alex Jones				Chris Evans; Alex Jones
14–18 March	Matt Baker; Alex Jones				**No Show** **(Comic Relief)**
21–25 March	Matt Baker; Alex Jones				Chris Evans; Alex Jones
28 March–1 April	Matt Baker; Alex Jones				Chris Evans; Alex Jones
4–8 April	Matt Baker; Alex Jones				**Matt Allwright**; Alex Jones
11–15 April	Matt Baker; Alex Jones				Chris Evans; Alex Jones
18–22 April	Matt Baker; Alex Jones				Chris Evans; Alex Jones
25–29 April	Matt Baker; Alex Jones				Chris Evans; Alex Jones
2–6 May	Matt Baker; Alex Jones				Chris Evans; Alex Jones
9–13 May	Matt Baker; Alex Jones				Chris Evans; Alex Jones
16–20 May	Matt Baker; Alex Jones				Chris Evans; Alex Jones
23–27 May	Matt Baker; Alex Jones				Chris Evans; Alex Jones
30 May–3 June	Matt Baker; Alex Jones				Chris Evans; Alex Jones
6–10 June	Matt Baker; Alex Jones				Chris Evans; Alex Jones
13–17 June	Matt Baker; Alex Jones				Chris Evans; Alex Jones
20–24 June	Matt Baker; Alex Jones				Chris Evans; Alex Jones
27 June–1 July	Matt Baker; Alex Jones				Chris Evans; Alex Jones
4–8 July	Matt Baker; Alex Jones				Chris Evans; Alex Jones
11–15 July	**No shows** **(Summer Break: 'The One Show - Best of Britain' was shown)**				
18–22 July	**No shows** **(Summer Break: 'The One Show - Best of Britain' was shown)**				
25–29 July	**No shows** **(Summer Break: 'The One Show - Best of Britain' was shown)**				
1–5 August	Matt Baker; Alex Jones				Chris Evans; Alex Jones
8–12 August	Matt Baker; Alex Jones				Chris Evans; Alex Jones
15–19 August	Matt Baker; Alex Jones				Chris Evans; Alex Jones
22–26 August	Matt Baker; Alex Jones				Chris Evans; Alex Jones
29 August–2 September	**No show: Bank Holiday** **(Military Tattoo)**	Matt Baker; Alex Jones			Chris Evans; Alex Jones
5–9 September	Matt Baker; Alex Jones		Matt Baker; **Anita Rani**	Matt Baker; Alex Jones	Chris Evans; Alex Jones
12–16 September	Matt Baker; Alex Jones				Chris Evans; Alex Jones
19–23 September	Matt Baker; Alex Jones				Chris Evans; Alex Jones
26–30 September	Matt Baker; Alex Jones				
3–7 October	Matt Baker; Alex Jones		**Matt Allwright**; Alex Jones	Matt Baker; Alex Jones	Chris Evans; Alex Jones
10–14 October	**Aled Jones**; Alex Jones	**Matt Allwright**; Alex Jones		**Joe Crowley**; Alex Jones	Chris Evans; Alex Jones
17–21 October	Matt Baker; Alex Jones				Chris Evans; Alex Jones
24–28 October	Matt Baker; Alex Jones				Chris Evans; Alex Jones
31 October–4 November	Matt Baker; Alex Jones				Chris Evans; Alex Jones
7–11 November	Matt Baker; Alex Jones			**Joe Crowley**; Alex Jones	Chris Evans; Alex Jones
14–18 November	**Joe Crowley**; Alex Jones	**Matt Allwright**; Alex Jones		**Joe Crowley**; Alex Jones	Matt Baker; Alex Jones **(Children in Need Special)**
21–25 November	Matt Baker; Alex Jones				Chris Evans; Alex Jones
28 November–2 December	Matt Baker; Alex Jones				Chris Evans; Alex Jones
5–9 December	Matt Baker; Alex Jones		Matt Baker; **Anita Rani**	Matt Baker; Alex Jones	Chris Evans; Alex Jones
12–16 December	Matt Baker; Alex Jones				Chris Evans; **Louise Minchin**
19–23 December	Matt Baker; Alex Jones				Chris Evans; Alex Jones
30 December	Matt Baker; Alex Jones **(Best of 2011)**				

2012
Week	Monday	Tuesday	Wednesday	Thursday	Friday
9–13 January	Matt Baker; **Anita Rani**			Matt Baker; **Zoe Ball**	Chris Evans; **Louise Minchin**
16–20 January	Matt Baker; Alex Jones				Chris Evans; Alex Jones
23–27 January	Matt Baker; Alex Jones				Chris Evans; Alex Jones
30 January–3 February	Matt Baker; Alex Jones				Chris Evans; Alex Jones
6–10 February	Matt Baker; Alex Jones				Chris Evans; Alex Jones
13–17 February	Matt Baker; Alex Jones				Chris Evans; Alex Jones
20–24 February	Matt Baker; Alex Jones				Chris Evans; Alex Jones
27 February–2 March	Matt Baker; Alex Jones				Chris Evans; Alex Jones
5–9 March	Matt Baker; Alex Jones		Matt Baker; **Louise Minchin**		Chris Evans; **Louise Minchin**
12–16 March	Matt Baker; Alex Jones				Chris Evans; Alex Jones
19–23 March	Matt Baker; Alex Jones				**No Show** **(Sport Relief)**
26–30 March	Matt Baker; Alex Jones				Chris Evans; Alex Jones
2–6 April	Matt Baker; Alex Jones				**No show** **(MOTD Live)**
9–13 April	**No show** **(Easter Monday)**	Matt Baker; Alex Jones			Chris Evans; Alex Jones
16–20 April	Matt Baker; Alex Jones				Chris Evans; Alex Jones
23–27 April	Matt Baker; Alex Jones				Chris Evans; Alex Jones
30 April–4 May	Matt Baker; Alex Jones				Chris Evans; Alex Jones
7–11 May	**No show** **(Bank Holiday)**	Matt Baker; Alex Jones			Chris Evans; Alex Jones
14–18 May	Matt Baker; Alex Jones				Chris Evans; Alex Jones; **Olympic Flame Special**
21–25 May	Matt Baker; Alex Jones				Chris Evans; Alex Jones
28 May–1 June	Matt Baker; Alex Jones				Chris Evans; Alex Jones
4–8 June	Matt Baker; Alex Jones				**No show** **(MOTD Live - Euro 2012 &** **BBC News)**
11–15 June	**No shows** **(Summer Break: 'The One Show - Best of Britain' & MOTD Live - Euro 2012 were shown)**				
18–22 June	**No shows** **(Summer Break: 'The One Show - Best of Britain' & MOTD Live - Euro 2012 were shown)**				
25–29 June	**No shows** **(Summer Break: 'The One Show - Best of Britain' & MOTD Live - Euro 2012 were shown)**				
2–6 July	Matt Baker; Alex Jones				Chris Evans; Alex Jones
9–13 July	Matt Baker; Alex Jones				**Matt Allwright**; Alex Jones
16–20 July	Matt Baker; Alex Jones				**Joe Crowley**; Alex Jones
23–27 July	Chris Evans; Alex Jones			**No show** **(Olympics: Men's Football)**	**No show** **(Olympics Opening Ceremony)**
30 July–3 August	**No shows** **(2012 Summer Olympics)**				
6–10 August	**No shows** **(2012 Summer Olympics)**				
13–17 August	Matt Baker; Alex Jones				Chris Evans; Alex Jones
20–24 August	Matt Baker; Alex Jones				Chris Evans; Alex Jones
27–31 August	**No show** **(Bank Holiday)**	Matt Baker; Alex Jones			Chris Evans; Alex Jones
3–7 September	Matt Baker; Alex Jones				Chris Evans; Alex Jones
10–14 September	Matt Baker; Alex Jones				Chris Evans; Alex Jones
17–21 September	Matt Baker; Alex Jones				Chris Evans; **Lucy Siegle**
24–28 September	Matt Baker; Alex Jones				Chris Evans; Alex Jones
1–5 October	**Matt Allwright**; Alex Jones		Matt Baker; Alex Jones		**Matt Allwright**; Alex Jones
8–12 October	Matt Baker; Alex Jones				Chris Evans; Alex Jones
15–19 October	Matt Baker; Alex Jones				Chris Evans; Alex Jones
22–26 October	**Joe Crowley**; Alex Jones	**Jake Humphrey**; Alex Jones		**Joe Crowley**; Alex Jones	Chris Evans; Alex Jones
29 October–2 November	Matt Baker; **Lucy Siegle**	Matt Baker; Alex Jones			Chris Evans; Alex Jones
5–9 November	Matt Baker; Alex Jones				Chris Evans; Alex Jones
12–16 November	Matt Baker; Alex Jones		**Jake Humphrey**; Alex Jones	Matt Baker; Alex Jones	Matt Baker; Alex Jones **(Children in Need Special)**
19–23 November	Matt Baker; Alex Jones				Chris Evans; Alex Jones
26–30 November	Matt Baker; Alex Jones				Chris Evans; Alex Jones
3–7 December	Matt Baker; Alex Jones				Chris Evans; Alex Jones
10–14 December	Matt Baker; Alex Jones				Chris Evans; Alex Jones
17–21 December	Matt Baker; Alex Jones				Chris Evans; Alex Jones
28 December	Matt Baker; Alex Jones; Chris Evans **(The One Show on Ice - Best of 2012)**				

2013
Week	Monday	Tuesday	Wednesday	Thursday	Friday
7–11 January	Matt Baker; **Sarah Millican**		Matt Baker; **Gabby Logan**	Matt Baker; Alex Jones	Chris Evans; Alex Jones
14–18 January	Matt Baker; Alex Jones				Chris Evans; Alex Jones
21–25 January	Matt Baker; Alex Jones				Chris Evans; Alex Jones
28 January–1 February	Matt Baker; Alex Jones				Chris Evans; Alex Jones
4–8 February	Matt Baker; Alex Jones				Chris Evans; Alex Jones
11–15 February	Matt Baker; Alex Jones				Chris Evans; Alex Jones
18–22 February	Matt Baker; Alex Jones				Chris Evans; Alex Jones
25 February–1 March	Matt Baker; Alex Jones	Matt Baker; **Gabby Logan**	Matt Baker; **Zoe Ball**		Chris Evans; Alex Jones
4–8 March	Matt Baker; Alex Jones				Chris Evans; Alex Jones
11–15 March	Matt Baker; Alex Jones				**No Show** **(Comic Relief)**
18–22 March	Matt Baker; Alex Jones				Chris Evans; Alex Jones; Matt Baker
25–29 March	Matt Baker; Alex Jones				Chris Evans; Alex Jones
1–5 April	Matt Baker; **Julia Bradbury**				Chris Evans; **Louise Minchin**
8–12 April	**Jake Humphrey**; Alex Jones	**Matt Allwright**; Alex Jones	**Michael Ball**; Alex Jones	**Jake Humphrey**; Alex Jones	**Michael Ball**; Alex Jones
15–19 April	Matt Baker; Alex Jones				Chris Evans; Alex Jones
22–26 April	Matt Baker; Alex Jones				Chris Evans; Alex Jones
29 April–3 May	Matt Baker; Alex Jones				Chris Evans; Alex Jones
6–10 May	Matt Baker; Alex Jones				Chris Evans; Alex Jones
13–17 May	Matt Baker; Alex Jones				Chris Evans; Alex Jones
20–24 May	Matt Baker; Alex Jones				**Michael Ball**; Alex Jones
27–31 May	Matt Baker; Alex Jones				Chris Evans; Alex Jones
3–7 June	Matt Baker; Alex Jones				**No Show** **(The Voice UK)**
10–14 June	Matt Baker; Alex Jones				Chris Evans; Alex Jones
17–21 June	Matt Baker; Alex Jones				Chris Evans; Alex Jones
24–28 June	Matt Baker; Alex Jones				Chris Evans; Alex Jones
1–5 July	Matt Baker; Alex Jones				Chris Evans; Alex Jones
8–12 July	Matt Baker; Alex Jones		Matt Baker; **Zoe Ball**	Matt Baker; Alex Jones	Chris Evans; Alex Jones
15–19 July	**No shows** **(Summer Break: 4 episodes of 'The One Show - Best of Britain' were shown)**				
22–26 July	**No shows** **(Summer Break: 4 episodes of 'The One Show - Best of Britain' were shown)**				
29 July–2 August	**No shows** **(Summer Break: 4 episodes of 'The One Show - Best of Britain' were shown)**				
5–9 August	Matt Baker; Alex Jones				Chris Evans; Alex Jones
12–16 August	Matt Baker; Alex Jones				Chris Evans; Alex Jones
19–23 August	Matt Baker; Alex Jones				Chris Evans; Alex Jones
26–30 August	**No show: Bank Holiday** **(Military Tattoo)**	Matt Baker; Alex Jones			Chris Evans; Alex Jones
2–6 September	Matt Baker; Alex Jones				Chris Evans; Alex Jones
9–13 September	Matt Baker; Alex Jones				Chris Evans; Alex Jones
16–20 September	Matt Baker; Alex Jones				Chris Evans; Alex Jones
23–27 September	Matt Baker; Alex Jones				Chris Evans; Alex Jones
30 September–4 October	Matt Baker; Alex Jones				Chris Evans; Alex Jones
7–11 October	Matt Baker; Alex Jones				Chris Evans; Alex Jones
14–18 October	Matt Baker; Alex Jones				Chris Evans; Alex Jones
21–25 October	Matt Baker; Alex Jones				Chris Evans; Alex Jones
28 October–1 November	Matt Baker; Alex Jones				Chris Evans; Alex Jones
4–8 November	Matt Baker; Alex Jones			Chris Evans; **Fearne Cotton**	
11–15 November	Matt Baker; Alex Jones		Matt Baker; **Tess Daly**	Matt Baker; Alex Jones	Matt Baker **(Children in Need Special)**
18–22 November	Matt Baker; Alex Jones				Chris Evans; Alex Jones
25–29 November	Matt Baker; Alex Jones				Chris Evans; Alex Jones
2–6 December	Matt Baker; Alex Jones				Chris Evans; Alex Jones
9–13 December	Matt Baker; Alex Jones				Chris Evans; Alex Jones
16–20 December	Matt Baker; Alex Jones				Chris Evans; Alex Jones
30 December	Matt Baker; Alex Jones; Chris Evans **(Best of 2013)**				

2014
Week	Monday	Tuesday	Wednesday	Thursday	Friday
6–10 January	Matt Baker; Alex Jones				Chris Evans; Alex Jones
13–17 January	Matt Baker; Alex Jones				Chris Evans; Alex Jones
20–24 January	Matt Baker; Alex Jones				Chris Evans; Alex Jones
27–31 January	Matt Baker; Alex Jones				Chris Evans; Alex Jones
3–7 February	Matt Baker; Alex Jones				Chris Evans; Alex Jones
10–14 February	Matt Baker; Alex Jones				Chris Evans; Alex Jones
17–21 February	Matt Baker; Alex Jones		Matt Baker; **Gabby Logan**	Matt Baker; **Fearne Cotton**	Chris Evans; **Fearne Cotton**
24–28 February	Matt Baker; **Gabby Logan**	Matt Baker; Alex Jones			Chris Evans; Alex Jones
3–7 March	Matt Baker; Alex Jones				Chris Evans; Alex Jones
10–14 March	Matt Baker; Alex Jones				Chris Evans; **Fearne Cotton**
17–21 March	Matt Baker; **Jo Brand**		Matt Baker; **Gabby Logan**	Matt Baker; **Angellica Bell**	**No Show** **(Sport Relief)**
24–28 March	Matt Baker; Alex Jones				Chris Evans; Alex Jones
31 March–4 April	Matt Baker; Alex Jones				Chris Evans; **Louise Minchin**
7–11 April	Matt Baker; Alex Jones				Chris Evans; Alex Jones
14–18 April	**Matt Allwright**; Alex Jones		**Richard Madeley**; Alex Jones	**Vernon Kay**; Alex Jones	
21–25 April	Matt Baker; Alex Jones				Chris Evans; Alex Jones
28 April–2 May	Matt Baker; Alex Jones				Chris Evans; Alex Jones
5–9 May	Matt Baker; Alex Jones				Chris Evans; Alex Jones
12–16 May	Matt Baker; Alex Jones				Chris Evans; Alex Jones
19–23 May	Matt Baker; Alex Jones				**Vernon Kay**; Alex Jones
26–30 May	Matt Baker; Alex Jones				Chris Evans; Alex Jones
2–6 June	Matt Baker; Alex Jones				Chris Evans; Alex Jones
9–13 June	Matt Baker; Alex Jones				**No Show** **(MOTD Live - 2014 World Cup)**
16–20 June	**No Shows** **(MOTD Live - 2014 World Cup)**				
23–27 June	Matt Baker; Alex Jones			**No Show** **(MOTD Live - 2014 World Cup)**	Chris Evans; Alex Jones
30 June–4 July	**No Shows** **(MOTD Live - 2014 World Cup)**		Matt Baker; Alex Jones		**No Show** **(MOTD Live - 2014 World Cup)**
7–11 July	Matt Baker; Alex Jones				**Dan Snow**; Alex Jones
14–18 July	Matt Baker; **Angellica Bell**		Matt Baker; Alex Jones		Chris Evans; Alex Jones
21–25 July	Matt Baker; Alex Jones			**No Shows** **(Commonwealth Games)**	
28 July–1 August	**No Shows** **(Week 1: Commonwealth Games) (Week 2: Summer Break)**				
4–8 August	**No Shows** **(Week 1: Commonwealth Games) (Week 2: Summer Break)**				
11–15 August	**Dan Snow**; Alex Jones		**Matt Allwright**; Alex Jones		**Vernon Kay**; **Anita Rani**
18–22 August	Matt Baker; Alex Jones				Chris Evans; **Fearne Cotton**
25–29 August	**No show: Bank Holiday** **(Military Tattoo)**	Matt Baker; Alex Jones		**Matt Allwright**; Alex Jones	Chris Evans; **Gabby Logan**
1–5 September	Matt Baker; Alex Jones				Chris Evans; Alex Jones
8–12 September	Matt Baker; Alex Jones		Matt Baker; Alex Jones; **Clare Balding**; **Invictus Games Opening Ceremony**	Matt Baker; Alex Jones	Chris Evans; Alex Jones
15–19 September	Matt Baker; Alex Jones				Chris Evans; Alex Jones
22–26 September	Matt Baker; Alex Jones				Chris Evans; Alex Jones
29 September–3 October	Matt Baker; Alex Jones				Chris Evans; Alex Jones
6–10 October	Matt Baker; Alex Jones		Matt Baker; **Gabby Logan**	Matt Baker; Alex Jones	Chris Evans; Alex Jones
13–17 October	Matt Baker; Alex Jones				Chris Evans; Alex Jones
20–24 October	Matt Baker; Alex Jones			**Richard Osman**; Alex Jones	Chris Evans; Alex Jones
27–31 October	**Eddie Mair**; Alex Jones				Chris Evans; Alex Jones
3–7 November	Matt Baker; Alex Jones	**No Show**	Matt Baker; Alex Jones	**No Show**	Chris Evans; Alex Jones
10–14 November	**Sir Terry Wogan**; Alex Jones	**Nick Grimshaw**; Alex Jones	**Mel Giedroyc**; Alex Jones	**Patrick Kielty**; Alex Jones	Matt Baker; Alex Jones **(Children in Need Special)**
17–21 November	Matt Baker; Alex Jones				Chris Evans; Alex Jones
23–27 November	Matt Baker; Alex Jones				Chris Evans; Alex Jones
1–5 December	Matt Baker; Alex Jones				Chris Evans; Alex Jones
8–12 December	Matt Baker; Alex Jones				Chris Evans; Alex Jones
15–19 December	Matt Baker; Alex Jones				Chris Evans; Alex Jones

2015
Week	Monday	Tuesday	Wednesday	Thursday	Friday
5–9 January	Matt Baker; Alex Jones				Chris Evans; Alex Jones
12–16 January	Matt Baker; Alex Jones				Chris Evans; Alex Jones
19–23 January	Matt Baker; Alex Jones				Chris Evans; Alex Jones
26–30 January	Matt Baker; Alex Jones				Chris Evans; Alex Jones
2–6 February	Matt Baker; **Denise Lewis**		Matt Baker; Alex Jones		Chris Evans; Alex Jones
9–13 February	Matt Baker; Alex Jones				Chris Evans; Alex Jones
16–20 February	Matt Baker; Alex Jones				Chris Evans; Alex Jones
23–27 February	Matt Baker; Alex Jones				Chris Evans; Alex Jones
2–6 March	Matt Baker; Alex Jones				Chris Evans; Alex Jones
9–13 March	Matt Baker; Alex Jones				**No Show** **(Comic Relief)**
16–20 March	Matt Baker; **Angellica Bell**	Matt Baker; Alex Jones			Chris Evans; Alex Jones
23–27 March	Matt Baker; Alex Jones			Matt Baker; **Angellica Bell**	Chris Evans; Alex Jones
30 March–3 April	**Shane Richie**; Alex Jones	**Angellica Bell**; Alex Jones	**Patrick Kielty**; Alex Jones	**James Martin**; Alex Jones	**Patrick Kielty**; Alex Jones
6–10 April	Matt Baker; Alex Jones				**Richard Osman**; Alex Jones
13–17 April	Matt Baker; Alex Jones				Chris Evans; Alex Jones
20–24 April	Matt Baker; Alex Jones				Chris Evans; Alex Jones
27 April–1 May	Matt Baker; Alex Jones				Chris Evans; Alex Jones
4–8 May	Matt Baker; Alex Jones				Chris Evans; Alex Jones
11–15 May	Matt Baker; Alex Jones				Chris Evans; Alex Jones
18–22 May	Matt Baker; Alex Jones				**Patrick Kielty**; Alex Jones
25–29 May	Matt Baker; Alex Jones				Chris Evans; Alex Jones
1–5 June	Matt Baker; Alex Jones				Chris Evans; Alex Jones
8–12 June	Matt Baker; Alex Jones				**Patrick Kielty**; Alex Jones
15–19 June	Matt Baker; Alex Jones				Chris Evans; Alex Jones
22–26 June	Matt Baker; Alex Jones				Chris Evans; Alex Jones
29 June–3 July	Matt Baker; Alex Jones				Chris Evans; Alex Jones
6–10 July	Matt Baker; Alex Jones				Chris Evans; Alex Jones
13–17 July	Matt Baker; Alex Jones				**Patrick Kielty**; Alex Jones
20–24 July	**No shows** **(Summer Break)**				
27–31 July	**No shows** **(Summer Break)**				
3–7 August	**No shows** **(Summer Break)**				
10–14 August	Matt Baker; Alex Jones				**Patrick Kielty**; Alex Jones
17–21 August	**Dan Walker**; Alex Jones		**Ore Oduba**; Alex Jones	**Patrick Kielty**; Alex Jones	
24–28 August	**Richard Blackwood**; Alex Jones		**Adil Ray**; Alex Jones		**Chris Evans**; Alex Jones
31 August–4 September	**No show: Bank Holiday** **(Military Tattoo)**	Matt Baker; Alex Jones			**Angellica Bell**; Alex Jones
7–11 September	Matt Baker; Alex Jones				**Nick Grimshaw**; Alex Jones
14–18 September	Matt Baker; Alex Jones				**Warwick Davis**; Alex Jones
21–25 September	Matt Baker; Alex Jones				**Ed Byrne**; Alex Jones
28 September–2 October	Matt Baker; Alex Jones				**Patrick Kielty**; Alex Jones
5–9 October	Matt Baker; Alex Jones				**Trevor Nelson**; Alex Jones
12–16 October	Matt Baker; **Mel Giedroyc**	Matt Baker; Alex Jones			**Shane Richie**; Alex Jones
19–23 October	Matt Baker; **Mel Giedroyc**	Matt Baker; Alex Jones			**Geri Horner**; Alex Jones
26–30 October	Matt Baker; **Angellica Bell**	**Angellica Bell**; Alex Jones			**Paul Hollywood**; Alex Jones
2–6 November	Matt Baker; Alex Jones			**James Martin**; Alex Jones	**Adil Ray**; Alex Jones
9–13 November	**Paul Merton**; Alex Jones	**Nick Grimshaw**; Alex Jones	**Warwick Davis**; Alex Jones	**Frank Skinner**; Alex Jones	Matt Baker; Alex Jones **(Children in Need Special)**
16–20 November	Matt Baker; Alex Jones				**Patrick Kielty**; **Angellica Bell**
23–27 November	Matt Baker; Alex Jones				**Will Young**; Alex Jones
30 November–4 December	Matt Baker; Alex Jones				**Ricky Wilson**; Alex Jones
7–11 December	Matt Baker; Alex Jones				**Jasper Carrott**; Alex Jones
14–18 December	Matt Baker; Alex Jones				

2016
Week	Monday	Tuesday	Wednesday	Thursday	Friday
4–8 January	Matt Baker; **Anita Rani**		Matt Baker; Alex Jones		**Rory Bremner**; Alex Jones
11–15 January	Matt Baker; Alex Jones			Matt Baker; **Nina Wadia**	**Anton du Beke**; Alex Jones
18–22 January	Matt Baker; **Anita Rani**	Matt Baker; Alex Jones			**Richard Osman**; Alex Jones
25–29 January	Matt Baker; Alex Jones				**Omid Djalili**; Alex Jones
1–5 February	Matt Baker; Alex Jones			Matt Baker; **Nina Wadia**	**Jeremy Vine**; Alex Jones
8–12 February	Matt Baker; Alex Jones			Matt Baker; **Louise Minchin**	**Dermot O'Leary**; Alex Jones
15–19 February	Matt Baker; **Angellica Bell**		Matt Baker; **Anita Rani**	Matt Baker; Alex Jones	**Nick Grimshaw**; Alex Jones
22–26 February	Matt Baker; Alex Jones				**Dermot O'Leary**; Alex Jones
29 February–4; March	Matt Baker; Alex Jones				**Vernon Kay**; Alex Jones
7–11 March	Matt Baker; **Fearne Cotton**	Matt Baker; **Konnie Huq**	Matt Baker; **Zoe Ball**	Matt Baker; **Denise Lewis**	**Joe Crowley**; **Louise Minchin**
14–18 March	Matt Baker; Alex Jones				**No Show** **(Sport Relief)**
21–25 March	Matt Baker; Alex Jones				**Richard Osman**; Alex Jones
28 March–1 April	**Chris Hollins**; Alex Jones	**Anita Rani**; Alex Jones	**Richard Madeley**; Alex Jones	**Adil Ray**; **Fearne Cotton**	**Greg James**; Alex Jones
4–8 April	Matt Baker; Alex Jones				**Jeremy Vine**; Alex Jones
11–15 April	Matt Baker; Alex Jones		**No Show** **(MOTD Live - FA Cup)**	Matt Baker; Alex Jones	**Patrick Kielty**; Alex Jones
18–22 April	Matt Baker; Alex Jones				**Craig Charles**; Alex Jones
25–29 April	Matt Baker; Alex Jones				**Michael Ball**; Alex Jones
2–6 May	Matt Baker; Alex Jones				**Ricky Wilson**; Alex Jones
9–13 May	Matt Baker; Alex Jones	**No Show** **(Invictus Games Highlights)**	Matt Baker; Alex Jones		**Bradley Walsh**; Alex Jones
16–20 May	Matt Baker; Alex Jones				**Josh Groban**; Alex Jones
23–27 May	Matt Baker; Alex Jones				**Gyles Brandreth**; Alex Jones
30 May–3 June	Matt Baker; Alex Jones			Matt Baker; **Angela Scanlon**	**Patrick Kielty**; Alex Jones
6–10 June	Matt Baker; Alex Jones				**Jerry Springer**; Alex Jones
13–17 June	**No shows** **(MOTD Live - Euro 2016)**				
20–24 June	Matt Baker; Alex Jones	**No shows** **(MOTD Live - Euro 2016)**		Matt Baker; Alex Jones	**Greg James**; Alex Jones
27 June–1 July	**No show** **(MOTD Live - Euro 2016)**	Matt Baker; Alex Jones			**No show** **(MOTD Live - Euro 2016)**
4–8 July	Matt Baker; Alex Jones			**No show** **(MOTD Live - Euro 2016)**	**Craig Charles**; Alex Jones
11–15 July	Matt Baker; Alex Jones				**Ade Adepitan**; Alex Jones
18–22 July	Matt Baker; **Brenda Emmanus**	Matt Baker; **Nina Wadia**	Matt Baker; Alex Jones		**Nina Wadia**; Alex Jones
25–29 July	Matt Baker; **Angela Scanlon**	Matt Baker; Alex Jones		**Gyles Brandreth**; Alex Jones	**Ricky Wilson**; Alex Jones
1–5 August	Matt Baker; Alex Jones	**Matt Allwright**; **Angela Scanlon**	Matt Baker; Alex Jones	**Joe Crowley**; Alex Jones	**Michael Ball**; Alex Jones
8–12 August	**No shows** **(2016 Summer Olympics)**				
15–19 August	**No shows** **(2016 Summer Olympics)**				
22–26 August	**Patrick Kielty**; Alex Jones			**Jack Docherty**; Alex Jones	
29 August–2; September	**No show: Bank Holiday** **(Military Tattoo)**	**Bill Turnbull**; Alex Jones			**Angellica Bell**; Alex Jones
5–9 September	Matt Baker; Alex Jones				**Gyles Brandreth**; Alex Jones
12–16 September	Matt Baker; **Michelle Ackerley**		Matt Baker; Alex Jones		**Steve Davis**; Alex Jones
19–23 September	Matt Baker; Alex Jones				**Jeremy Vine**; Alex Jones
26–30 September	Matt Baker; **Angela Scanlon**	Matt Baker; Alex Jones			**Shane Richie**; Alex Jones
3–7 October	Matt Baker; Alex Jones	Matt Baker; **Michelle Ackerley**	Matt Baker; Alex Jones		**Patrick Kielty**; Alex Jones
10–14 October	Matt Baker; Alex Jones				**Richard Osman**; Alex Jones
17–21 October	Matt Baker; Alex Jones				**John Barrowman**; Alex Jones
24–28 October	Matt Baker; Alex Jones				**Al Murray**; Alex Jones
31 October–4; November	Matt Baker; Alex Jones				**Fay Ripley**; Alex Jones
7–11 November	Matt Baker; Alex Jones			**Ore Oduba**; Alex Jones	**Caroline Quentin**; Alex Jones
14-18 November	Alex Jones; **Angellica Bell**		**Patrick Kielty**; Alex Jones		
21–25 November	Matt Baker; Alex Jones				**Gyles Brandreth**; Alex Jones
28 November–2 December	Matt Baker; Alex Jones				**Jon Richardson**; Alex Jones
5–9 December	Matt Baker; Alex Jones				**Adil Ray**; Alex Jones
12–16 December	Matt Baker; Alex Jones				

2017
Week	Monday	Tuesday	Wednesday	Thursday	Friday
2–6 January	Matt Baker; Alex Jones				**Patrick Kielty**; Alex Jones
9–13 January	Matt Baker; Michelle Ackerley		Matt Baker; Angela Scanlon		**Al Murray**; Angela Scanlon
16–20 January	Matt Baker; Michelle Ackerley			Matt Baker; Angela Scanlon	**Fay Ripley**; Angela Scanlon
23–27 January	Matt Baker; Michelle Ackerley		Matt Baker; Angela Scanlon		**Michael Ball**; Angela Scanlon
30 January–3 February	Matt Baker; Michelle Ackerley			Matt Baker; Angela Scanlon	**Jon Richardson**; Angela Scanlon
6–10 February	Matt Baker; Michelle Ackerley		Matt Baker; Angela Scanlon		**Richard Osman**; Angela Scanlon
13–17 February	Matt Baker; Michelle Ackerley			Matt Baker; Angela Scanlon	**Ore Oduba**; Angela Scanlon
20–24 February	Matt Baker; Michelle Ackerley		Matt Baker; Angela Scanlon		**Si King**; **Dave Myers**
27 February–3 March	Matt Baker; Michelle Ackerley			Matt Baker; Angela Scanlon	**Jon Richardson**; Angela Scanlon
6–10 March	Matt Baker; Michelle Ackerley		Matt Baker; Angela Scanlon		**Jeremy Vine**; Angela Scanlon
13–17 March	Matt Baker; Michelle Ackerley			Matt Baker; Angela Scanlon	**Michael Ball**; Angela Scanlon
20–24 March	Matt Baker; Michelle Ackerley		Matt Baker; Angela Scanlon		**No Show** **(Comic Relief)**
27–31 March	Matt Baker; Michelle Ackerley		**No Show** **(Britain and the** **EU: The Brexit Interviews)**	Matt Baker; Angela Scanlon	**Richard Osman**; Angela Scanlon
3–7 April	Matt Baker; Michelle Ackerley		Matt Baker; Angela Scanlon		**Ore Oduba**; Angela Scanlon
10–14 April	Matt Baker; Michelle Ackerley		Matt Baker; Angela Scanlon		**Al Murray**; Angela Scanlon
17–21 April	Matt Baker; Michelle Ackerley		Matt Baker; Angela Scanlon		**Amol Rajan**; Angela Scanlon
24–28 April	Matt Baker; Alex Jones		Matt Baker; Michelle Ackerley		**Ronan Keating**; Angela Scanlon
1–5 May	Matt Baker; Alex Jones			Matt Baker; Angela Scanlon	**Gyles Brandreth**; Angela Scanlon
8–12 May	Matt Baker; Alex Jones		Matt Baker; **Angellica Bell**		**Michael Ball**; Alex Jones
15–19 May	Matt Baker; Alex Jones			Matt Baker; Angela Scanlon	**Jon Richardson**; Angela Scanlon
22–26 May	**No Shows** **(Election 2017: The Andrew Neil Interviews) & BBC News**		**Matt Allwright**; Michelle Ackerley	**Amol Rajan**; Michelle Ackerley	**No Show** **(Election 2017: The Andrew Neil Interviews)**
29 May–2 June	**Ore Oduba**; Angela Scanlon	**Ore Oduba**; Alex Jones		**No Show** **(Election 2017: The Andrew Neil Interviews)**	**Patrick Kielty**; Alex Jones
5–9 June	Matt Baker; Alex Jones			Matt Baker; **Gabby Logan**	**Amol Rajan**; Alex Jones
12–16 June	Matt Baker; Alex Jones			Matt Baker; **Gabby Logan**	**Richard Osman**; Alex Jones
19–23 June	Matt Baker; Alex Jones			Matt Baker; **Angellica Bell**	**Jerry Springer**; Alex Jones
26–30 June	Matt Baker; Alex Jones				**Sally Phillips**; Alex Jones
3–7 July	Matt Baker; Alex Jones		Matt Baker; Angela Scanlon		**Katherine Ryan**; Alex Jones
10–14 July	Matt Baker; Alex Jones	Matt Baker; Angela Scanlon	Matt Baker; Alex Jones	**Kevin Duala**; Alex Jones	**Rob Beckett**; Alex Jones
17–21 July	**No shows** **(Summer Break)**				
24–28 July	**No shows** **(Summer Break)**				
31 July–4 August	**No shows** **(Summer Break)**				
7–11 August	Matt Baker; Alex Jones				
14–18 August	Matt Baker; Alex Jones		Matt Baker; **Gabby Logan**	Matt Baker; Alex Jones	**No Show** **(Death of Sir Bruce Forsyth)**
21–25 August	Matt Baker; Alex Jones; **A Tribute to Sir Bruce Forsyth**	Matt Baker; Alex Jones	Matt Baker; Michelle Ackerley	Matt Baker; Alex Jones	**Michael Ball**; Alex Jones
28 August–1 September	**No show: Bank Holiday** **(Military Tattoo)**	Matt Baker; Alex Jones			**Patrick Kielty**; Alex Jones
4–8 September	Matt Baker; Alex Jones	Matt Baker; **Gabby Logan**	Matt Baker; Alex Jones		**Fay Ripley**; Alex Jones
11–15 September	Matt Baker; Alex Jones				**Shane Richie**; Angela Scanlon
18–22 September	Matt Baker; Alex Jones				**Richard Osman**; Alex Jones
25–29 September	Matt Baker; Alex Jones	**No Show** **(Invictus Games)**	Matt Baker; Alex Jones		**Ore Oduba**; Alex Jones
2–6 October	Matt Baker; Alex Jones	**Amol Rajan**; Alex Jones			**Gyles Brandreth**; Alex Jones
9–13 October	Matt Baker; Alex Jones			Matt Baker; Angela Scanlon	**Amol Rajan**; Alex Jones
16–20 October	Matt Baker; **Angellica Bell**	Matt Baker; Michelle Ackerley	Matt Baker; Alex Jones		**Ricky Wilson**; Alex Jones
23–27 October	**Ore Oduba**; Alex Jones				
30 October–3 November	**Amol Rajan**; Michelle Ackerley	**Amol Rajan**; Alex Jones			
6–10 November	Matt Baker; Alex Jones				**Sally Phillips**; Alex Jones
13–17 November	**Michael Ball**; Alex Jones			**Amol Rajan**; Alex Jones	**Greg James**; Alex Jones **(Children in Need Special)**
20–24 November	Matt Baker; Alex Jones				**Patrick Kielty**; Alex Jones
27 November–1 December	Matt Baker; Michelle Ackerley	Matt Baker; Alex Jones		Matt Baker; Michelle Ackerley	**Ore Oduba**; Alex Jones
4–8 December	Matt Baker; Alex Jones	Matt Baker; Michelle Ackerley	Matt Baker; Alex Jones		**Patrick Kielty**; Alex Jones
11–15 December	Matt Baker; Alex Jones			Matt Baker; Angela Scanlon	**Patrick Kielty**; Alex Jones
18–22 December	Matt Baker; Alex Jones	Matt Baker; Angela Scanlon	Matt Baker; Alex Jones		

2018
Week	Monday	Tuesday	Wednesday	Thursday	Friday
8–12 January	Matt Baker; Michelle Ackerley				**Patrick Kielty**; Michelle Ackerley
15–19 January	Matt Baker; Angela Scanlon		Matt Baker; Alex Jones		**Michael Ball**; Alex Jones
22–26 January	Matt Baker; Angela Scanlon	Matt Baker; Michelle Ackerley	Matt Baker; Alex Jones	Matt Baker; Angela Scanlon	**Ade Adepitan**; Alex Jones
29 January–2 February	Matt Baker; Alex Jones	Matt Baker; Angela Scanlon	Matt Baker; Alex Jones		**Dan Walker**; Alex Jones
5–9 February	Matt Baker; Angela Scanlon	Matt Baker; Alex Jones			**Jeremy Vine**; Alex Jones
12–16 February	Matt Baker; Alex Jones			Matt Baker; Michelle Ackerley	**Greg James**; Michelle Ackerley
19–23 February	Matt Baker; Alex Jones			Matt Baker; **Angellica Bell**	**Dev Griffin**; Alex Jones
26 February–2 March	Matt Baker; Alex Jones		Matt Baker; Alex Jones **(Snow Special)**	Matt Baker; **Angellica Bell**	**Ore Oduba**; Alex Jones **(Snow Special)**
5–9 March	Matt Baker; Alex Jones				**Michael Ball**; Alex Jones
12–16 March	Matt Baker; **Angellica Bell**		Matt Baker; Michelle Ackerley	Matt Baker; **Angellica Bell**	**Matt Allwright**; **Angellica Bell**
19–23 March	Matt Baker; Alex Jones				**No Show** **(Sport Relief)**
26–30 March	Matt Baker; Alex Jones			**Amol Rajan**; Alex Jones	Matt Baker; **Angellica Bell**
2–6 April	Matt Baker; Alex Jones		**Ore Oduba**; Alex Jones	Matt Baker; Alex Jones	**Amol Rajan**; Alex Jones
9–13 April	**Amol Rajan**; Alex Jones	Matt Baker; Alex Jones			**Adil Ray**; Alex Jones
16–20 April	Matt Baker; Alex Jones	Matt Baker; **Angellica Bell**		Matt Baker; Michelle Ackerley	**Gyles Brandreth**; Alex Jones
23–27 April	Matt Baker; Michelle Ackerley	Matt Baker; Alex Jones			**Sally Phillips**; Alex Jones
30 April–4 May	Matt Baker; **Angellica Bell**	Matt Baker; Alex Jones			**Jerry Springer**; Alex Jones
7–11 May	Matt Baker; Alex Jones		**Ore Oduba**; Alex Jones	Matt Baker; Alex Jones	Matt Baker; Alex Jones **(NHS Patients Awards Special)**
14–18 May	Matt Baker; Michelle Ackerley	Matt Baker; Alex Jones	**Ore Oduba**; Alex Jones	Matt Baker; Alex Jones	**No Show** **(The Royal Wedding)**
21–25 May	Matt Baker; Alex Jones		**No Show** **(Chelsea Flower Show)**	Matt Baker; Alex Jones	**Al Murray**; Alex Jones
28 May–1 June	Matt Baker; Alex Jones				**Dev Griffin**; Alex Jones
4–8 June	Matt Baker; Alex Jones				**Greg James**; Alex Jones
11–15 June	Matt Baker; Alex Jones				**No Show** **(MOTD Live - 2018 World Cup)**
18–22 June	**No shows** **(Summer Break was during the 2018 World Cup period)**				
25–29 June	**No shows** **(Summer Break was during the 2018 World Cup period)**				
2–6 July	**No shows** **(Summer Break was during the 2018 World Cup period)**				
9–13 July	Matt Baker; Alex Jones	**No Show** **(MOTD Live - 2018 World Cup)**	**Angellica Bell**; Alex Jones	Matt Baker; Alex Jones	**Ore Oduba**; Alex Jones
16–20 July	Matt Baker; Alex Jones		**Kevin Duala**; **Angellica Bell**	Matt Baker; Alex Jones	
23–27 July	Matt Baker; **Anita Rani**	Matt Baker; Alex Jones	Matt Baker; **Sandi Toksvig**	Matt Baker; Alex Jones	**Amol Rajan**; Alex Jones
30 July–3 August	Matt Baker; Alex Jones			**Amol Rajan**; Alex Jones	**Michael Ball**; Alex Jones
6–10 August	Matt Baker; Alex Jones				**Dev Griffin**; Alex Jones
13–17 August	Matt Baker; Alex Jones			Matt Baker; **Angellica Bell**	**Rory Reid**; Alex Jones
20–24 August	Matt Baker; Alex Jones				**Ore Oduba**; Alex Jones
27–31 August	**No show: Bank Holiday** **(Military Tattoo)**	Matt Baker; **Angellica Bell**	Matt Baker; Alex Jones		**Joe Lycett**; Alex Jones
3–7 September	Matt Baker; Alex Jones				**Sally Phillips**; Alex Jones
10–14 September	Matt Baker; Alex Jones	**Ore Oduba**; Alex Jones	Matt Baker; Alex Jones		**Sara Cox**; Alex Jones
17–21 September	Matt Baker; Alex Jones	Matt Baker; **Angela Griffin**	Matt Baker; Alex Jones	Matt Baker; Angela Scanlon	**Amol Rajan**; Alex Jones
24–28 September	Matt Baker; Alex Jones				Angela Scanlon; Alex Jones
1–5 October	Matt Baker; **Gabby Logan**	Matt Baker; Alex Jones		Matt Baker; **Angela Griffin**	**Jon Richardson**; Alex Jones
8–12 October	Matt Baker; Angela Scanlon		Matt Baker; Alex Jones		**Michael Ball**; Alex Jones
15–19 October	Matt Baker; **Gabby Logan**	Matt Baker; **Angellica Bell**	Matt Baker; Angela Scanlon	Matt Baker; **Angellica Bell**	**Ore Oduba**; Angela Scanlon
22–26 October	**Ore Oduba**; **Angela Griffin**	**No Show** **(Invictus Games)**	**Ore Oduba**; **Angela Griffin**	**Ore Oduba**; **Gabby Logan**	**Amol Rajan**; **Susan Calman**
29 October–2 November	**Amol Rajan**; Alex Jones			**Amol Rajan**; **Angellica Bell**	**Michael Ball**; Alex Jones
5–9 November	Matt Baker; **Gabby Logan**	Matt Baker; Alex Jones		**Ore Oduba**; Alex Jones	**Rob Beckett**; Alex Jones
12–16 November	**Ade Adepitan**; Alex Jones	**Marvin Humes**; Alex Jones	**Sandi Toksvig**; Alex Jones	**Michael Ball**; Alex Jones	**Shane Richie**; Alex Jones **(Children in Need Special)**
19–23 November	Matt Baker; **Gabby Logan**	Matt Baker; Alex Jones		Matt Baker; Angela Scanlon	**Al Murray**; Angela Scanlon
26–30 November	Matt Baker; **Angela Griffin**	Matt Baker; Alex Jones			**Sara Cox**; Alex Jones
3–7 December	Matt Baker; Alex Jones				**Josh Groban**; Alex Jones
10–14 December	Matt Baker; Alex Jones			**Gyles Brandreth**; Alex Jones	**Susan Calman**; Alex Jones
17–21 December	Matt Baker; Alex Jones	**Amol Rajan**; Alex Jones	Matt Baker; Alex Jones		

2019
Week	Monday	Tuesday	Wednesday	Thursday	Friday
7–11 January	Matt Baker; Alex Jones				**Michael Ball**; Alex Jones
14–18 January	Matt Baker; Alex Jones				**Greg James**; Alex Jones
21–25 January	Matt Baker; Alex Jones				**Rylan Clark-Neal**; Alex Jones
28 January–1 February	Matt Baker; Alex Jones		Matt Baker; **Angellica Bell**	Matt Baker; Alex Jones	**Patrick Kielty**; Alex Jones
4–8 February	Matt Baker; Alex Jones				**Michael Ball**; Alex Jones
11–15 February	Matt Baker; Alex Jones				**Greg James**; Alex Jones
18–22 February	**No Show** **(MOTD Live - FA Cup)**	Matt Baker; Alex Jones			**Joe Sugg**; Alex Jones
25 February–1 March	Matt Baker; Alex Jones			**Amol Rajan**; **Angela Scanlon**	**Ore Oduba**; Alex Jones
4–8 March	Matt Baker; Alex Jones			**Amol Rajan**; Alex Jones	**Oti Mabuse**; Alex Jones
11–15 March	Matt Baker; Alex Jones				**No Show** **(Comic Relief)**
18–22 March	Matt Baker; Alex Jones				**Rylan Clark-Neal**; Alex Jones
25–29 March	Matt Baker; Alex Jones				**Ashley Banjo**; Alex Jones
1–5 April	Matt Baker; Alex Jones		**Ore Oduba**; Alex Jones	Matt Baker; Alex Jones	**Patrick Kielty**; Alex Jones
8–12 April	Matt Baker; Alex Jones			**Amol Rajan**; Alex Jones	**Peter Andre**; Alex Jones
15–19 April	Matt Baker; Alex Jones				**Ore Oduba**; Alex Jones
22–26 April	Matt Baker; Alex Jones				**Shane Richie**; Alex Jones
29 April–3 May	Matt Baker; Angellica Bell				**Rylan Clark-Neal**; Angellica Bell
6–10 May	Matt Baker; Angellica Bell				**Patrick Kielty**; Angellica Bell
13–17 May	Matt Baker; Angellica Bell				**Amol Rajan**; Angellica Bell
20–24 May	Matt Baker; Angela Scanlon		**No Show** **(Chelsea Flower Show)**	Matt Baker; Angela Scanlon	**Rylan Clark-Neal**; Angela Scanlon
27–31 May	Matt Baker; Angela Scanlon			Matt Baker; Alex Scott	**Amol Rajan**; Angela Scanlon
3–7 June	Matt Baker; Emma Willis				**Patrick Kielty**; Emma Willis
10–14 June	Matt Baker; Emma Willis				**Nick Grimshaw**; Emma Willis
17–21 June	Matt Baker; Angela Scanlon			**Michael Ball**; Angela Scanlon	**Amol Rajan**; Angela Scanlon
24–28 June	Matt Baker; Mel Giedroyc				**Jo Whiley**; Mel Giedroyc
1–5 July	**No shows** **(Summer Break)**				
8–12 July	**No shows** **(Summer Break)**				
15–19 July	**No shows** **(Summer Break)**				
22–26 July	Matt Baker; Angellica Bell				**Patrick Kielty**; Angellica Bell
29 July–2 August	Matt Baker; Stacey Dooley				**Rylan Clark-Neal**; Stacey Dooley
5–9 August	Matt Baker; Michelle Ackerley				**Joe Lycett**; Michelle Ackerley
12–16 August	Matt Baker; Michelle Ackerley			**Ore Oduba**; Michelle Ackerley	**Amol Rajan**; Michelle Ackerley
19–23 August	Matt Baker; Angellica Bell				**Marvin Humes**; Angellica Bell
26–30 August	**No show: Bank Holiday** **(Military Tattoo)**	Matt Baker; Emma Willis			**Nick Grimshaw**; Emma Willis
2–6 September	Matt Baker; Alex Scott		Matt Baker; Mel Giedroyc		**Sue Perkins**; Mel Giedroyc
9–13 September	Matt Baker; Angela Scanlon			Matt Baker; Angellica Bell	**Patrick Kielty**; Angellica Bell
16–20 September	Matt Baker; Angela Scanlon				**Frank Skinner**; Angela Scanlon
23–27 September	Matt Baker; Clara Amfo		**Rylan Clark-Neal**; Clara Amfo	Angela Scanlon; Clara Amfo	**Ade Adepitan**; Angellica Bell
30 September–4 October	Matt Baker; Michelle Ackerley		**No Show** **(Celebrity MasterChef)**	Matt Baker; Michelle Ackerley	**Iain Stirling**; Michelle Ackerley
7–11 October	**Patrick Kielty**; Michelle Ackerley				
14–18 October	Matt Baker; Angellica Bell				**Marvin Humes**; Angellica Bell
21–25 October	**Amol Rajan**; Michelle Ackerley				
28 September–1 November	Matt Baker; Alex Scott				**Jamie Cullum**; Angellica Bell
4–8 November	Matt Baker; Michelle Ackerley			**Ore Oduba**; Michelle Ackerley	
11–15 November	**Amol Rajan**; Michelle Ackerley				
18–22 November	Matt Baker; Angellica Bell				**Iain Stirling**; Angellica Bell
25–29 November	Matt Baker; Angela Scanlon		**Amol Rajan**; Angela Scanlon	**Marvin Humes**; Angela Scanlon	**Nick Grimshaw**; Angela Scanlon
2–6 December	Matt Baker; Angellica Bell	**Gethin Jones**; Angellica Bell	Matt Baker; Angellica Bell	**Gethin Jones**; Angellica Bell	**Ashley John-Baptiste**; Angellica Bell
9–13 December	**Amol Rajan**; Michelle Ackerley	**Matt Allwright**; Michelle Ackerley	**Marvin Humes**; Michelle Ackerley	**Gyles Brandreth**; Michelle Ackerley	**Chris Kamara**; Michelle Ackerley
16–20 December	**Patrick Kielty**; Alex Scott				

=== 2020–present ===
2020
Week	Monday	Tuesday	Wednesday	Thursday	Friday
6–10 January	**Patrick Kielty**; Alex Jones				
13–17 January	Matt Baker; Alex Jones				**Chris Ramsey**; Alex Jones
20–24 January	Matt Baker; Alex Jones				**Michael Ball**; Alex Jones
27–31 January	Matt Baker; Alex Jones				**Amol Rajan**; Alex Jones
3–7 February	Matt Baker; Alex Jones				**Dev Griffin**; Alex Jones
10–14 February	Matt Baker; Alex Jones				**Michael Ball**; Alex Jones
17–21 February	Matt Baker; Alex Jones	**Amol Rajan**; Alex Jones	Matt Baker; Alex Jones		**Rob Beckett**; Alex Jones
24–28 February	Matt Baker; Alex Jones				**Chris Ramsey**; Alex Jones
2–6 March	Matt Baker; Alex Jones				**Chris Ramsey**; Alex Jones
9–13 March	Matt Baker; Alex Jones				**No Show** **(Sport Relief)**
16–20 March	Matt Baker; Alex Jones			**Patrick Kielty**; Alex Jones	**Chris Ramsey**; Alex Jones
23–27 March	**Patrick Kielty**; Alex Jones	Alex Jones	**Patrick Kielty**; Alex Jones		
30 March–3 April	**Amol Rajan**; Alex Jones	Matt Baker; Alex Jones	**Amol Rajan**; Alex Jones		
6–10 April	**Alex Scott**; Alex Jones				**No show: Good Friday** **(Indiana Jones)**
13–17 April	**No show: Easter Monday** **(Indiana Jones)**	**Gethin Jones**; Alex Jones			
20–24 April	**Patrick Kielty**; Alex Jones			**No show** **(The Big Night In)**	**Patrick Kielty**; Alex Jones
27 April–1 May	**Amol Rajan**; Alex Jones				
4–8 May	**Gethin Jones**; Alex Jones				**Huw Edwards**; Alex Jones **(VE Day Special)**
11–15 May	**Michael Ball**; Alex Jones				
18–22 May	**Alex Scott**; Alex Jones				**Rylan Clark-Neal**; Alex Jones
25–29 May	**No show: Bank Holiday** **(BBC News Special)**	**Angellica Bell**; Alex Jones			
1–5 June	**Gethin Jones**; Alex Jones		**Rylan Clark-Neal**; Alex Jones		
8–12 June	**Amol Rajan**; Alex Jones				**Iain Stirling**; Alex Jones
15–19 June	**Michael Ball**; Alex Jones				**Kym Marsh**; Alex Jones
22–26 June	**Chris Ramsey**; Alex Jones		**No Show** **(MOTD Live - Premier League)**	**Chris Ramsey**; Alex Jones	
29 June–3 July	**Gethin Jones**; Alex Jones				**Alex Scott**; Alex Jones
6–10 July	**Amol Rajan**; **Kym Marsh**				
13–17 July	**Gethin Jones**; **Alex Scott**		**No Show** **(MOTD Live - Premier League)**	**Gethin Jones**; **Alex Scott**	
20–24 July	**Rylan Clark-Neal**; Alex Jones				
27–31 July	**Michael Ball**; Alex Jones				**No show** **(BAFTA Television Awards)**
3–7 August	**Gethin Jones**; Alex Jones				
10–14 August	**Chris Ramsey**; Alex Jones				
17–21 August	**Gethin Jones**; Alex Jones				**Iain Stirling**; Alex Jones
24–28 August	**Michael Ball**; Alex Jones				**Ronan Keating**; Alex Jones
31 August–4 September	**No show: Bank Holiday** **(Paddington 2)**	**Amol Rajan**; Alex Jones			
7–11 September	**Gethin Jones**; Alex Jones				**Jermaine Jenas**; Alex Jones
14–18 September	**Ronan Keating**; Alex Jones				**Riyadh Khalaf**; Alex Jones
21–25 September	**No show** **(Panorama)**	**Amol Rajan**; Alex Jones			**Rylan Clark-Neal**; Alex Jones
28 September–2 October	**Chris Ramsey**; Alex Jones				
5–9 October	**Jermaine Jenas**; Alex Jones				**Jermaine Jenas**; **Alex Scott**
12–16 October	**Michael Ball**; Alex Jones		**Michael Ball**; **Michelle Ackerley**	**Michael Ball**; Alex Jones	**Carl Hutchinson**; Alex Jones
19–23 October	**Gethin Jones**; Alex Jones				**Harry Judd**; Alex Jones
26–30 October	**Rylan Clark-Neal**; Alex Jones			**Gethin Jones**; **Alex Scott**	
2–6 November	**Ronan Keating**; **Angela Scanlon**			**Michael Ball**; **Alex Scott**	**No show** **(Little Mix The Search)**
9–13 November	**Michael Ball**; **Alex Scott**	**Michael Ball**; Alex Jones			**No show** **(Children in Need)**
16–20 November	**Jermaine Jenas**; Alex Jones				**Harry Judd**; Alex Jones
23–27 November	**Ronan Keating**; Alex Jones				**Harry Judd**; Alex Jones
30 November–4 December	**Amol Rajan**; Alex Jones				**Alex Scott**; Alex Jones
7–11 December	**No show** **(Panorama)**	**Jermaine Jenas**; Alex Jones		**Alex Scott**; Alex Jones	**Shane Richie**; Alex Jones
14–18 December	**Jermaine Jenas**; Alex Jones		**Alex Scott**; Alex Jones	**Ronan Keating**; Alex Jones	

2021
Week	Monday	Tuesday	Wednesday	Thursday	Friday
4–8 January	**Jermaine Jenas**; Alex Jones				**Harry Judd**; Alex Jones
11–15 January	**Amol Rajan**; Alex Jones				**Jordan Banjo**; Alex Jones
18–22 January	**Ronan Keating**; Alex Jones				
25–29 January	**Jermaine Jenas**; Alex Jones			**Michael Ball**; Alex Jones	
1–5 February	**Michael Ball**; Alex Jones			**Alex Scott**; Alex Jones	
8–12 February	**Ronan Keating**; Alex Jones	**No Show** **(MOTD Live - FA Cup)**	**Ronan Keating**; Alex Jones		
15–19 February	**Jermaine Jenas**; Alex Jones			**Harry Judd**; Alex Jones	
22–26 February	**Amol Rajan**; Alex Jones				**Alex Scott**; Alex Jones
1–5 March	**Jermaine Jenas**; Alex Jones			**Ronan Keating**; Alex Jones	**Martin Clunes**; Alex Jones
8–12 March	**No show** **(Panorama)**	**Rylan Clark-Neal**; Alex Jones			
15–19 March	**Michael Ball**; Alex Jones				**No show** **(Comic Relief)**
22–26 March	**No show** **(Panorama)**	**No show** **(BBC News Special)**	**Alex Scott**; Alex Jones	**Ronan Keating**; Alex Jones	
29 March–2 April	**Jermaine Jenas**; Alex Jones				**No show: Good Friday** **(The Sound of Music)**
5–9 April	**No show: Easter Monday** **(Sort Your Life Out)**	**Amol Rajan**; Alex Jones			**No show** **BBC News Special (The Death of** **Prince Philip, Duke of Edinburgh)**
12–16 April	**Rylan Clark-Neal**; Alex Jones				**No show** **(HRH The Duke of Edinburgh Remembered)**
19–23 April	**Michael Ball**; Alex Jones				**Clara Amfo**; Alex Jones
26–30 April	**Alex Scott**; Alex Jones			**Amol Rajan**; Alex Jones	**Rylan Clark-Neal**; **Alex Scott**
3–7 May	**Rylan Clark-Neal**; Alex Jones		**Ronan Keating**; Alex Jones	**Rylan Clark-Neal**; Alex Jones	**Ronan Keating**; Alex Jones
10–14 May	Jermaine Jenas; Alex Jones			Ronan Keating; Alex Jones	
17–21 May	Jermaine Jenas; Alex Jones			Ronan Keating; Alex Jones	
24–28 May	Jermaine Jenas; Alex Jones			Ronan Keating; Alex Jones	
31 May–4 June	Jermaine Jenas; **Angela Scanlon**			Jermaine Jenas; **Angellica Bell**	**Harry Judd**; **Angellica Bell**
7–11 June	Jermaine Jenas; Alex Jones			Ronan Keating; Alex Jones	**No shows** **(MOTD Live - Euro 2020)**
14–18 June	Ronan Keating; Alex Jones		**No show** **(MOTD Live - Euro 2020)**	Ronan Keating; Alex Jones	**No shows** **(MOTD Live - Euro 2020)**
21–25 June	Jermaine Jenas; Alex Jones	**No show** **(EastEnders)**	Ronan Keating; Alex Jones		**Harry Judd**; Alex Jones
28 June–2 July	**No show** **(Wimbledon)**	**No show** **(MOTD Live - Euro 2020)**	Ronan Keating; Alex Jones		**No show** **(MOTD Live - Euro 2020)**
5–9 July	Jermaine Jenas; **Emma Willis**		Ronan Keating; **Angellica Bell**	Ronan Keating; **Alex Scott**	Ronan Keating; Alex Jones
12–16 July	Jermaine Jenas; Alex Jones			Ronan Keating; Alex Jones	
19–23 July	Jermaine Jenas; Alex Jones		Ronan Keating; Alex Jones		
26–30 July	Jermaine Jenas; Alex Jones			Ronan Keating; Alex Jones	
2–6 August	**Gethin Jones**; Alex Jones		**Amol Rajan**; Alex Jones	Ronan Keating; Alex Jones	**Gethin Jones**; Alex Jones
9–13 August	**No shows** **(Summer Break)**				
16–20 August	**No shows** **(Summer Break)**				
23–27 August	**No shows** **(Summer Break)**				
30 August–3 September	**No show: Bank Holiday** **(Military Tattoo)**	Jermaine Jenas; **Sam Quek**		Ronan Keating; **Sam Quek**	Ronan Keating; **Angellica Bell**
6–10 September	Jermaine Jenas; **Alex Scott**		Jermaine Jenas; **Zoe Ball**	Ronan Keating; **Zoe Ball**	
13–17 September	Jermaine Jenas; **Angela Scanlon**	Jermaine Jenas; **Sam Quek**		**Gethin Jones**; **Sam Quek**	Ronan Keating; **Rylan Clark-Neal**
20–24 September	Jermaine Jenas; Ronan Keating; Alex Jones	Jermaine Jenas; **Alex Scott**	**No Show** **(RHS Chelsea Flower Show)**	**Gethin Jones**; **Alex Scott**	Ronan Keating; **Michelle Visage**
27 September–1 October	Jermaine Jenas; **Alex Scott**			**Harry Judd**; **Alex Scott**	**Harry Judd**; **Lauren Laverne**
4–8 October	Jermaine Jenas; **Sam Quek**			Ronan Keating; **Rylan Clark-Neal**	Ronan Keating; **Angellica Bell**
11–15 October	Ronan Keating; **Sam Quek**				**Harry Judd**; **Angellica Bell**
18–22 October	Jermaine Jenas; **Alex Scott**	Ronan Keating; **Alex Scott**	Jermaine Jenas; Ronan Keating	**Harry Judd**; Alex Jones	**Tom Daley**; Alex Jones
25–29 October	Jermaine Jenas	Jermaine Jenas; **Oti Mabuse**	Jermaine Jenas; **Michelle Ackerley**	**Gethin Jones**; **Sam Quek**	**Harry Judd**; **Angellica Bell**
1–5 November	**Gethin Jones**; **Alex Scott**				**Gethin Jones**
8–12 November	Jermaine Jenas; **Zoe Ball**	Jermaine Jenas; **Sam Quek**		**JJ Chalmers**; **Rylan**; Ronan Keating	**Harry Judd**; **Lauren Laverne**
15–19 November	Jermaine Jenas; **Alex Scott**	Jermaine Jenas; **Lauren Laverne**	Jermaine Jenas; **Zoe Ball**	Ronan Keating; **Zoe Ball**	**No show** **(Children in Need)**
22–26 November	Jermaine Jenas; **Michelle Ackerley**	Jermaine Jenas; **Lauren Laverne**		Ronan Keating; **Rylan**	Ronan Keating; **Angellica Bell**
29 November–3 December	Jermaine Jenas; **Lauren Laverne**		Jermaine Jenas; **Alex Scott**	Ronan Keating; **Alex Scott**	Ronan Keating; **Angellica Bell**
6–10 December	Jermaine Jenas; **Lauren Laverne**		Ronan Keating; **Michelle Ackerley**		Ronan Keating; **Tom Daley**
13–17 December	Jermaine Jenas; **Sam Quek**	Jermaine Jenas; **Lauren Laverne**	Jermaine Jenas; **Sam Quek**	Ronan Keating; **Angellica Bell**	Jermaine Jenas; Ronan Keating; Alex Jones

2022
Week	Monday	Tuesday	Wednesday	Thursday	Friday	Saturday
3–7 January	**No show: New Year's Day (Attenborough's Wonder of Song)**	Jermaine Jenas; Alex Jones		Ronan Keating; Alex Jones		**N/A**
10–14 January	Jermaine Jenas; Alex Jones	Jermaine Jenas; **Lauren Laverne**	Jermaine Jenas; Alex Jones	**Harry Judd**; Alex Jones	Ronan Keating; Alex Jones	**N/A**
17–21 January	**Alex Scott**; Alex Jones	Jermaine Jenas; **Lauren Laverne**	Jermaine Jenas; Alex Jones	**Rylan Clark**; **Lauren Laverne**	**Rylan Clark**; Alex Jones	**N/A**
24–28 January	Jermaine Jenas; Alex Jones	Jermaine Jenas; **Lauren Laverne**	Jermaine Jenas; Alex Jones	Ronan Keating; Alex Jones		**N/A**
31 January–4 February	Jermaine Jenas; Alex Jones	Jermaine Jenas; **Lauren Laverne**	Ronan Keating; Alex Jones			**N/A**
7–11 February	Jermaine Jenas; Alex Jones	Jermaine Jenas; **Lauren Laverne**	Jermaine Jenas; Alex Jones	Ronan Keating; Alex Jones		**N/A**
14–18 February	Jermaine Jenas; **Alex Scott**	Jermaine Jenas; **Lauren Laverne**	Jermaine Jenas; Alex Jones	**Rylan**; Alex Jones		**N/A**
21–25 February	**Angellica Bell**; **Lauren Laverne**	**Harry Judd**; **Lauren Laverne**	Ronan Keating; Alex Jones			**N/A**
28 February–4 March	**Harry Judd**; Alex Jones	**Harry Judd**; **Lauren Laverne**	Ronan Keating; Alex Jones	**Harry Judd**; Alex Jones		**N/A**
7–11 March	Jermaine Jenas; Alex Jones	Jermaine Jenas; **Lauren Laverne**	Jermaine Jenas; Alex Jones	Ronan Keating; Alex Jones		**N/A**
14–18 March	Jermaine Jenas; Alex Jones	Jermaine Jenas; **Lauren Laverne**	Jermaine Jenas; Alex Jones	**Angellica Bell**; Alex Jones	**No show** **(Comic Relief)**	**N/A**
21–25 March	Jermaine Jenas; **Emma Willis**	Jermaine Jenas; **Michelle Ackerley**	Jermaine Jenas; **Emma Willis**	**Rylan**; Alex Jones		**N/A**
28 March–1 April	**Alex Scott**; Alex Jones	**Harry Judd**; **Gabby Logan**	**Harry Judd**; Alex Jones		**Alex Scott**; Alex Jones	**N/A**
4–8 April	Jermaine Jenas; Alex Jones	Jermaine Jenas; **Lauren Laverne**	Jermaine Jenas; Alex Jones	**Gethin Jones**; Alex Jones	**Gethin Jones**; **Zoe Ball**	**N/A**
11–15 April	Jermaine Jenas; Alex Jones			**Emma Willis**; Alex Jones	**No show: Good Friday** **(Dinosaurs: The Final Day with David Attenborough)**	**N/A**
18–22 April	**No shows** **(Invictus Games)**		Jermaine Jenas; **Zoe Ball**	**No show** **(Invictus Games)**	Ronan Keating; **Zoe Ball**	**N/A**
25–29 April	Jermaine Jenas; Alex Jones	Jermaine Jenas; **Lauren Laverne**	Jermaine Jenas; Alex Jones	Ronan Keating; Alex Jones		**N/A**
2–6 May	Jermaine Jenas; Alex Jones	Jermaine Jenas; **Lauren Laverne**	**Gethin Jones**; **Lauren Laverne**	Ronan Keating; **Alex Scott**	Ronan Keating; **Clara Amfo**	**N/A**
9–13 May	Jermaine Jenas; Alex Jones			Ronan Keating; Alex Jones	**Roman Kemp**; Alex Jones	**N/A**
16–20 May	Jermaine Jenas; Alex Jones	Jermaine Jenas; Ronan Keating	Jermaine Jenas; Alex Jones	Ronan Keating; **Michelle Ackerley**	Ronan Keating; Alex Jones	**N/A**
23–27 May	Jermaine Jenas; Alex Jones		**No show** **(RHS Chelsea Flower Show)**	Ronan Keating; Alex Jones		**N/A**
30 May–3 June	Jermaine Jenas; **Emma Willis**	Ronan Keating; **Emma Willis**	Jermaine Jenas; **Emma Willis**	Ronan Keating; Alex Jones		**N/A**
6–10 June	Jermaine Jenas; Alex Jones			**Roman Kemp**; Alex Jones		**N/A**
13–17 June	Jermaine Jenas; Alex Jones			Jermaine Jenas; **Lauren Laverne**	**Harry Judd**; Alex Jones	**N/A**
20–24 June	Jermaine Jenas; **Gabby Logan**	Jermaine Jenas; **Angela Scanlon**		**Gethin Jones**; Alex Jones	Ronan Keating; Alex Jones	**N/A**
27 June–1 July	Jermaine Jenas; Alex Jones	**Rylan**; Alex Jones	Jermaine Jenas; Alex Jones	**Roman Kemp**; Alex Jones	**Rylan**; Alex Jones	**N/A**
4–8 July	Jermaine Jenas; Alex Jones		**No shows** **(Women's Euro 2022)**			**N/A**
11–15 July	**No show** **(Women's Euro 2022)**	**Harry Judd**; Alex Jones	**Roman Kemp**; Alex Jones	Ronan Keating; Alex Jones		**N/A**
18–22 July	Ronan Keating; **Alex Scott**	**Roman Kemp**; **Alex Scott**	Ronan Keating; **Roman Kemp**	Ronan Keating; **Tom Daley**	**Roman Kemp**; Alex Jones	**N/A**
25–29 July	Jermaine Jenas; Alex Jones			**No show** **(Commonwealth Games Opening Ceremony)**	**No show** **(Commonwealth Games)**	**N/A**
1–5 August	**No shows** **(Commonwealth Games)**					**N/A**
8–12 August	**No shows** **(Summer Break)**					**N/A**
15–19 August	**No shows** **(Summer Break)**					**N/A**
22–26 August	Jermaine Jenas; **Emma Willis**			Ronan Keating; **Michelle Ackerley**		**N/A**
29 August–2 September	**No show: Bank Holiday** **(Military Tattoo)**	Ronan Keating; Alex Jones	Jermaine Jenas; Alex Jones	Ronan Keating; Alex Jones	Jermaine Jenas; Alex Jones	**N/A**
5–10 September	Jermaine Jenas; Alex Jones	Ronan Keating; Alex Jones		**No shows** **BBC News Special** **(Death of HM Queen Elizabeth II)**		**Gethin Jones**; Alex Jones; **Our Queen Remembered**
12–16 September	**Gethin Jones**; Alex Jones; **Our Queen Remembered**		**No show** **(HM the Queen: Events of the Day)**	**Gethin Jones**; Alex Jones; **Our Queen Remembered**	**No show** **(HM the Queen: The Vigil)**	**N/A**
19–23 September	**Gethin Jones**; Alex Jones; **Our Queen Remembered**	Jermaine Jenas; **Emma Willis**	Jermaine Jenas; Alex Jones	Ronan Keating; Alex Jones	**No show** **(Strictly Come Dancing)**	**N/A**
26–30 September	Jermaine Jenas; Alex Jones			**Roman Kemp**; Alex Jones		**N/A**
3–7 October	Jermaine Jenas; Alex Jones	Ronan Keating; **Lauren Laverne**	Jermaine Jenas; Alex Jones	Ronan Keating; Alex Jones	**Roman Kemp**; Alex Jones	**N/A**
10–14 October	Jermaine Jenas; Alex Jones	Jermaine Jenas; **Lauren Laverne**	Ronan Keating; Alex Jones		**Roman Kemp**; Alex Jones	**N/A**
17–21 October	**Roman Kemp**; **Lauren Laverne**	Jermaine Jenas; Alex Jones	Jermaine Jenas; **Lauren Laverne**	Ronan Keating; Alex Jones		**N/A**
24–28 October	Jermaine Jenas; Alex Jones	Jermaine Jenas; **Zoe Ball**	Ronan Keating; **Zoe Ball**		**Craig Revel Horwood**; Alex Jones	**N/A**
31 October–4 November	Jermaine Jenas; **Lauren Laverne**	**Roman Kemp**; Alex Jones	Jermaine Jenas; Alex Jones	Ronan Keating; Alex Jones		**N/A**
7–11 November	**Roman Kemp**; Alex Jones	Alex Jones	Jermaine Jenas; Alex Jones	**Roman Kemp**; Alex Jones		**N/A**
14–18 November	Jermaine Jenas; **Lauren Laverne**		Jermaine Jenas; Alex Jones	Ronan Keating; Alex Jones	**No show** **(Children in Need)**	**N/A**
21–25 November	**Roman Kemp**; Alex Jones	**No Shows** **(FIFA World Cup)**	Ronan Keating; Alex Jones		**Gethin Jones**; Alex Jones	**N/A**
28 November–2 December	**No show** **(EastEnders)**	**No Shows** **(FIFA World Cup)**	**No Show** **(FIFA World Cup)**	Ronan Keating; Alex Jones	**Roman Kemp**; Alex Jones	**N/A**
5–9 December	Ronan Keating; Alex Jones		**Roman Kemp**; Alex Jones	Ronan Keating; Alex Jones	**Gethin Jones**; Alex Jones	**N/A**
12–16 December	**Roman Kemp**; Alex Jones		**Harry Judd**; Alex Jones	**Harry Judd**; **Lauren Laverne**	**Gethin Jones**; Alex Jones	**N/A**
19–23 December	Ronan Keating; **Michelle Ackerley**	**Harry Judd**; Alex Jones	**No Show** **(SPOTY)**	Ronan Keating; Alex Jones	**No Show** **(The Weakest Link: Christmas Special)**	**N/A**

2023
Week	Monday	Tuesday	Wednesday	Thursday	Friday	Saturday
2–6 January	**No show: New Year's Day** **(Countryfile)**	Jermaine Jenas; Alex Jones		**Roman Kemp**; Alex Jones		**N/A**
9–13 January	Jermaine Jenas; Alex Jones	Jermaine Jenas; **Lauren Laverne**	Jermaine Jenas; Alex Jones	Ronan Keating; Alex Jones		**N/A**
16–20 January	Jermaine Jenas; Alex Jones			**Gethin Jones**; Alex Jones	**Roman Kemp**; Alex Jones	**N/A**
23–27 January	Jermaine Jenas; Alex Jones	Jermaine Jenas; **Lauren Laverne**	Jermaine Jenas; Alex Jones	Ronan Keating; Alex Jones		**N/A**
30 January–3 February	Jermaine Jenas; Alex Jones	Ronan Keating; Alex Jones				**N/A**
6–10 February	Jermaine Jenas; Alex Jones	Jermaine Jenas; **Lauren Laverne**	Jermaine Jenas; Alex Jones	Ronan Keating; Alex Jones		**N/A**
13–17 February	Jermaine Jenas; Alex Jones	**Alex Scott**; Alex Jones	Jermaine Jenas; **Emma Willis**	Ronan Keating; **Emma Willis**	Jermaine Jenas; **Emma Willis**	**N/A**
20–24 February	Jermaine Jenas; Alex Jones	Jermaine Jenas; **Lauren Laverne**	Jermaine Jenas; Alex Jones	Ronan Keating; Alex Jones	Jermaine Jenas; Alex Jones	**N/A**
27 February–3 March	Ronan Keating; Alex Jones	Jermaine Jenas; Alex Jones	**Alex Scott**; Alex Jones	**Roman Kemp**; Alex Jones	**Emma Willis**; Alex Jones	**N/A**
6–10 March	**Roman Kemp**; Alex Jones	**Lauren Laverne**; Alex Jones	**Roman Kemp**; Alex Jones		Jermaine Jenas; Alex Jones	**N/A**
13–17 March	**Gethin Jones**; Alex Jones	Jermaine Jenas; **Lauren Laverne**	Jermaine Jenas; Alex Jones	Jermaine Jenas; **Rylan**; Alex Jones	**No show** **(Comic Relief)**	**N/A**
20–24 March	Jermaine Jenas; Ronan Keating	Jermaine Jenas; **Lauren Laverne**	Jermaine Jenas; Alex Jones			**N/A**
27–31 March	Jermaine Jenas; Alex Jones			Ronan Keating; Alex Jones		**N/A**
3–7 April	Jermaine Jenas; **Emma Willis**		Ronan Keating; **Emma Willis**	**Gethin Jones**; **Alex Scott**	**Gethin Jones**; **Clara Amfo**	**N/A**
10–14 April	**Alex Scott**; **Emma Willis**	**Emma Willis**; Alex Jones	**Alex Scott**; Alex Jones	**Anita Rani**; Alex Jones	**Alex Scott**; Alex Jones	**N/A**
17–21 April	**Roman Kemp**; Alex Jones	**Roman Kemp**; **Lauren Laverne**	**Roman Kemp**; Alex Jones	Ronan Keating; Alex Jones		**N/A**
24–28 April	Jermaine Jenas; Alex Jones			**Roman Kemp**; Alex Jones	Jermaine Jenas; **Emma Willis**	**N/A**
1–5 May	Jermaine Jenas; Alex Jones		Jermaine Jenas; **Lauren Laverne**	Jermaine Jenas; Alex Jones	**No Show** **(The Coronation of TM The King** **and Queen Camilla)**	**N/A**
8–13 May	**No Show** **(Eurovision Welcomes the World)**	Ronan Keating; Alex Jones; **The One Show at Eurovision**			**Rylan**; Alex Jones; **The One Show at Eurovision**	**Rylan**; Alex Jones; **Eurovision Countdown**
15–19 May	Jermaine Jenas; Alex Jones	Jermaine Jenas; **Lauren Laverne**	Jermaine Jenas; Alex Jones	**Roman Kemp**; Alex Jones	Jermaine Jenas; Alex Jones	**N/A**
22–26 May	**Roman Kemp**; Alex Jones	Jermaine Jenas; Alex Jones	**No show** **(RHS Chelsea Flower Show)**	**Roman Kemp**; Alex Jones	**Roman Kemp**; **Alex Scott**	**N/A**
29 May–2 June	Jermaine Jenas; **Anita Rani**	**Roman Kemp**; **Angellica Bell**		**Roman Kemp**; Alex Jones		**N/A**
5–9 June	Jermaine Jenas; Alex Jones	**Lauren Laverne**; Alex Jones	**Alex Scott**; Alex Jones	**Roman Kemp**; Alex Jones		**N/A**
12–16 June	Jermaine Jenas; Alex Jones	Jermaine Jenas; **Lauren Laverne**	Jermaine Jenas; Alex Jones	**Roman Kemp**; Alex Jones		**N/A**
19–23 June	Jermaine Jenas; Alex Jones			**Gethin Jones**; Alex Jones		**N/A**
26–30 June	Jermaine Jenas; Alex Jones	Jermaine Jenas; **Lauren Laverne**	Jermaine Jenas; Alex Jones	**Roman Kemp**; Alex Jones		**N/A**
3–7 July	Jermaine Jenas; Alex Jones		**Lauren Laverne**; Alex Jones	**Roman Kemp**; Alex Jones		**N/A**
10–14 July	Jermaine Jenas; Alex Jones	Jermaine Jenas; **Lauren Laverne**	Jermaine Jenas; Alex Jones	**Roman Kemp**; Alex Jones	**No Show**	**N/A**
17–21 July	Jermaine Jenas; Alex Jones		**Roman Kemp**; Alex Jones		Jermaine Jenas; Alex Jones	**N/A**
24–28 July	Jermaine Jenas; Alex Jones	Jermaine Jenas; **Vick Hope**	Jermaine Jenas; Alex Jones	**Roman Kemp**; Alex Jones		**N/A**
31 July–4 August	Jermaine Jenas; Alex Jones			**Roman Kemp**; Alex Jones		**N/A**
7–11 August	**No shows** **(Summer Break)**					
14–18 August	**No shows** **(Summer Break)**					
21–25 August	**No shows** **(Summer Break)**					
28 August–1 September	**No show: Bank Holiday** **(Attenborough and the Mammoth Graveyard)**	Roman Kemp; **Angellica Bell**	Jermaine Jenas; Roman Kemp	Roman Kemp; Alex Jones		**N/A**
4–8 September	Jermaine Jenas; Alex Jones	Jermaine Jenas; **Gabby Logan**	Jermaine Jenas; Alex Jones	Roman Kemp; Alex Jones	Lauren Laverne; Alex Jones	**N/A**
11–15 September	Jermaine Jenas; Alex Jones	Roman Kemp; Alex Jones	Ronan Keating; Alex Jones	Jermaine Jenas; Alex Jones	Roman Kemp; Alex Jones	**N/A**
18–22 September	Jermaine Jenas; Alex Jones	Roman Kemp; Lauren Laverne	Jermaine Jenas; Alex Jones	Roman Kemp; Alex Jones		**N/A**
25–29 September	Jermaine Jenas; Alex Jones			Roman Kemp; Alex Jones		**N/A**
2–6 October	Jermaine Jenas; Alex Jones	Roman Kemp; Lauren Laverne	Lauren Laverne; Alex Jones	Jermaine Jenas; Alex Jones	Roman Kemp; Alex Jones	**N/A**
9–13 October	Jermaine Jenas; Alex Jones			Roman Kemp; Alex Jones		**N/A**
16–20 October	Jermaine Jenas; Alex Jones	Jermaine Jenas; Lauren Laverne	Jermaine Jenas; Alex Jones	Roman Kemp; Alex Jones	**Alex Scott**; Alex Jones	**N/A**
23–27 October	Jermaine Jenas; **Gabby Logan**		Jermaine Jenas; **Vick Hope**	**Gethin Jones**; **Alex Scott**		**N/A**
30 October–3 November	Lauren Laverne; Alex Jones	Roman Kemp; Lauren Laverne	Ronan Keating; Alex Jones	Roman Kemp; Alex Jones		**N/A**
6–10 November	Jermaine Jenas; Alex Jones	Ronan Keating; Lauren Laverne	Jermaine Jenas; Alex Jones	Roman Kemp; Alex Jones		**N/A**
13–17 November	Jermaine Jenas; Alex Jones	Roman Kemp; Lauren Laverne	Jermaine Jenas; Alex Jones	Roman Kemp; Alex Jones	**No show** **(Children in Need)**	**N/A**
20–24 November	Jermaine Jenas; Alex Jones			Roman Kemp; Lauren Laverne	Roman Kemp; Alex Jones	**N/A**
27 November–1 December	Roman Kemp; Alex Jones	Lauren Laverne; Alex Jones	Jermaine Jenas; Alex Jones	Roman Kemp; Lauren Laverne	Jermaine Jenas; Alex Jones	**N/A**
4–8 December	Jermaine Jenas; Alex Jones		**Alex Scott**; Alex Jones	Roman Kemp; Alex Jones	Jermaine Jenas; Alex Jones	**N/A**
11–15 December	Jermaine Jenas; Alex Jones	Jermaine Jenas; Lauren Laverne	Ronan Keating; Alex Jones	Roman Kemp; Alex Jones		**N/A**

2024
Week	Monday	Tuesday	Wednesday	Thursday	Friday
1–5 January	**No show: New Year's Day** **(The Witches)**	Jermaine Jenas; Lauren Laverne		Roman Kemp; Lauren Laverne	
8–12 January	Jermaine Jenas; Alex Jones	Jermaine Jenas; Lauren Laverne	Roman Kemp; Alex Jones		
15–19 January	Jermaine Jenas; Alex Jones			Roman Kemp; Alex Jones	Lauren Laverne; Alex Jones
22–26 January	**Gethin Jones**; Lauren Laverne	Ronan Keating; Alex Jones		Lauren Laverne; Alex Jones	**Paddy McGuinness**; Alex Jones
29 January–2 February	Jermaine Jenas; Alex Jones	Lauren Laverne; Alex Jones	Jermaine Jenas; Alex Jones	Roman Kemp; Alex Jones	
5–9 February	Jermaine Jenas; Alex Jones	Jermaine Jenas; Lauren Laverne	Ronan Keating; Alex Jones	Lauren Laverne; Alex Jones	**Vernon Kay**; Alex Jones
12–16 February	Jermaine Jenas; Alex Jones			Jermaine Jenas; Lauren Laverne	Roman Kemp; **Angellica Bell**
19–23 February	Lauren Laverne; Alex Jones	Ronan Keating; Lauren Laverne	Jermaine Jenas; Alex Jones	Roman Kemp; Alex Jones	
26 February–1 March	Jermaine Jenas; Alex Jones		**Vernon Kay**; Lauren Laverne	Roman Kemp; Alex Jones	
4–8 March	Jermaine Jenas; Alex Jones	Jermaine Jenas; Lauren Laverne	Jermaine Jenas; Alex Jones	Roman Kemp; Alex Jones	
11–15 March	Jermaine Jenas; Alex Jones		Lauren Laverne; **Anita Rani**	Roman Kemp; Alex Jones	**No show** **(Comic Relief)**
18–22 March	Jermaine Jenas; Alex Jones	Jermaine Jenas; Lauren Laverne		Jermaine Jenas; Roman Kemp	Roman Kemp; **Clara Amfo**
25–29 March	Jermaine Jenas; Alex Jones		Roman Kemp; **Alex Scott**	**Gethin Jones**; **Alex Scott**	
1–5 April	**No show: Easter Monday** **(MasterChef)**	Roman Kemp; Alex Jones	**Alex Scott**; Alex Jones	Roman Kemp; Alex Jones	
8–12 April	Jermaine Jenas; Lauren Laverne			Roman Kemp; **Clara Amfo**	
15–19 April	Jermaine Jenas; Alex Jones	Jermaine Jenas; Lauren Laverne	Jermaine Jenas; Alex Jones	Roman Kemp; Alex Jones	
22–26 April	Jermaine Jenas; Alex Jones			Roman Kemp; Alex Jones	
29 April–3 May	Jermaine Jenas; Alex Jones			Roman Kemp; Alex Jones	
6–10 May	Jermaine Jenas; Lauren Laverne	Jermaine Jenas; Alex Jones		Roman Kemp; Alex Jones	
13–17 May	Jermaine Jenas; **Clara Amfo**	Jermaine Jenas; Alex Jones	Jermaine Jenas; **Vick Hope**	Roman Kemp; Lauren Laverne	Roman Kemp; Alex Jones
20–24 May	Jermaine Jenas; Alex Jones		**No show** **(RHS Chelsea Flower Show)**	Roman Kemp; Alex Jones	
27–31 May	Jermaine Jenas; Alex Jones	Roman Kemp; Lauren Laverne	Jermaine Jenas; Alex Jones	Roman Kemp; Alex Jones	
3–7 June	Jermaine Jenas; Alex Jones		Jermaine Jenas; Alex Jones; **D-Day Special**	Lauren Laverne; Alex Jones	Roman Kemp; Alex Jones
10–14 June	Jermaine Jenas; Alex Jones	Jermaine Jenas; Lauren Laverne	Jermaine Jenas; Alex Jones	**Anita Rani**; Alex Jones	**Clara Amfo**; Alex Jones
17–21 June	**Clara Amfo**; Alex Jones	Lauren Laverne; Alex Jones		**Vernon Kay**; Alex Jones	
24–28 June	**Anita Rani**; Alex Jones			Roman Kemp; Alex Jones	
1–5 July	**No shows** **(Wimbledon & MOTD Live - Euro 2024)**				
8–12 July	Lauren Laverne; Alex Jones	**Vernon Kay**; Lauren Laverne	**No show** **(Wimbledon)**	Roman Kemp; Alex Jones	**Vernon Kay**; Alex Jones
15–19 July	Jermaine Jenas; Alex Jones			Roman Kemp; **Anita Rani**	
22–26 July	Jermaine Jenas; Alex Jones	**Anita Rani**; Alex Jones	Roman Kemp; Alex Jones		**No show** **(Olympics Opening Ceremony)**
29 July–2 August	**No shows** **(2024 Summer Olympics)**				
5–9 August	**No shows** **(2024 Summer Olympics)**				
12–15 August	Lauren Laverne; Alex Jones		Roman Kemp; **Alex Scott**	Roman Kemp; Alex Jones	
19–23 August	Roman Kemp; Alex Jones	**Gabby Logan**; Alex Jones	**Alex Scott**; **Clara Amfo**	**Clara Amfo**; Alex Jones	Roman Kemp; Alex Jones
26–30 August	**No show: Bank Holiday** **(Military Tattoo)**	**Vernon Kay**; **Clara Amfo**	**Alex Scott**; **Clara Amfo**	Roman Kemp; **Alex Scott**	
2–6 September	Roman Kemp; Alex Jones		**Clara Amfo**; Alex Jones	Roman Kemp; Alex Jones	
9–13 September	Roman Kemp; Alex Jones	**Clara Amfo**; Alex Jones	**Anita Rani**; Alex Jones	Roman Kemp; Alex Jones	
16–20 September	Roman Kemp; Alex Jones	Roman Kemp; **Alex Scott**	**Vernon Kay**; Alex Jones	Roman Kemp; Alex Jones	
23–27 September	Roman Kemp; Alex Jones		**Vernon Kay**; Alex Jones	Roman Kemp; Alex Jones	
30 September–4 October	Roman Kemp; Alex Jones	**Angellica Bell**; Alex Jones	**Vernon Kay**; Alex Jones	Roman Kemp; Alex Jones	Roman Kemp; **Vick Hope**
7–11 October	Roman Kemp; Alex Jones	**Alex Scott**; Alex Jones			Roman Kemp; Alex Jones
14–18 October	Roman Kemp; Alex Jones		**Clara Amfo**; Alex Jones	Roman Kemp; Alex Jones	Roman Kemp; **Vick Hope**
21–25 October	Roman Kemp; Alex Jones	**Alex Scott**; Alex Jones	**Gabby Logan**; Alex Jones	Roman Kemp; Alex Jones	Roman Kemp; **Vick Hope**
28 October–1 November	Roman Kemp; **Clara Amfo**		**Vernon Kay**; **Clara Amfo**	Roman Kemp; **Clara Amfo**	**Angellica Bell**; **Clara Amfo**
4–8 November	**Gethin Jones**; Alex Jones	**Alex Scott**; **Anita Rani**	**Vernon Kay**; Alex Jones	**Clara Amfo**; Alex Jones	**Tom Allen**; Alex Jones
11–15 November	Roman Kemp; Alex Jones	Roman Kemp; **Clara Amfo**	Roman Kemp; Alex Jones		**No show** **(Children in Need)**
18–22 November	Roman Kemp; Alex Jones	**Anita Rani**; Alex Jones	**Angellica Bell**; Alex Jones	Roman Kemp; **Angellica Bell**	Roman Kemp; Alex Jones
25–29 November	**Angellica Bell**; Alex Jones	Lauren Laverne; Alex Jones	Roman Kemp; Alex Jones		
2–6 December	Roman Kemp; Alex Jones	Lauren Laverne; Alex Jones		Roman Kemp; **Alex Scott**	Roman Kemp; Alex Jones
9–13 December	Roman Kemp; Alex Jones		Lauren Laverne; Alex Jones	Roman Kemp; Lauren Laverne	Roman Kemp; Alex Jones
15–20 December	Lauren Laverne; Alex Jones	**No Show** **(SPOTY)**	**Clara Amfo**; Alex Jones	Roman Kemp; Alex Jones	Lauren Laverne; Alex Jones

2025
Week	Monday	Tuesday	Wednesday	Thursday	Friday
6–10 January	Lauren Laverne; Alex Jones	Lauren Laverne; **Gabby Logan**	**Clara Amfo**; Alex Jones	Lauren Laverne; Alex Jones	**Clara Amfo**; Alex Jones
13–17 January	**Vernon Kay**; Alex Jones	Lauren Laverne; Alex Jones	**Vernon Kay**; Alex Jones	Roman Kemp; Alex Jones	Roman Kemp; **Clara Amfo**
20–24 January	Roman Kemp; Alex Jones	Lauren Laverne; Alex Jones	**Vernon Kay**; **Clara Amfo**	Roman Kemp; Alex Jones	
27–31 January	**No Show** **(Holocaust Memorial Day 2025)**	**Clara Amfo**; Alex Jones	**Vernon Kay**; Alex Jones	Roman Kemp; Alex Jones	Roman Kemp; **Clara Amfo**
3–7 February	Roman Kemp; **Clara Amfo**	Roman Kemp; Lauren Laverne	Lauren Laverne; **Clara Amfo**	Roman Kemp; Alex Jones	
10–14 February	**Alex Scott**; Alex Jones	**Clara Amfo**; Alex Jones	**Vernon Kay**; Alex Jones	Lauren Laverne; Alex Jones	Lauren Laverne; **Clara Amfo**
17–21 February	Roman Kemp; **Clara Amfo**	Roman Kemp; Lauren Laverne	Lauren Laverne; **Clara Amfo**	Roman Kemp; Alex Jones	
24–28 February	Roman Kemp; Alex Jones	**Clara Amfo**; Alex Jones	**Vernon Kay**; **Clara Amfo**	Roman Kemp; Alex Jones	Roman Kemp; Lauren Laverne
3–7 March	Roman Kemp; Alex Jones	Lauren Laverne; Alex Jones	**Clara Amfo**; Alex Jones	Roman Kemp; Alex Jones	
10–14 March	**Clara Amfo**; Alex Jones		**JB Gill**; Alex Jones	**Clara Amfo**; Alex Jones	Lauren Laverne; **Clara Amfo**
17–21 March	**Vernon Kay**; Alex Jones	**Vernon Kay**; Lauren Laverne	**Clara Amfo**; Alex Jones	**Vernon Kay**; Alex Jones	**No show** **(Comic Relief)**
24–28 March	Roman Kemp; Alex Jones; **Dame Mary Berry, a Celebration at 90**	**Vernon Kay**; Alex Jones	**Angellica Bell**; Alex Jones	**JB Gill**; Alex Jones	
31 March–4 April	**Alex Scott**; Alex Jones	Lauren Laverne; Alex Jones	**Angellica Bell**; Alex Jones		**Vernon Kay**; **Clara Amfo**
7–11 April	**Gethin Jones**; **Alex Scott**	**Gethin Jones**; **Clara Amfo**	**Clara Amfo**; **Alex Scott**	**JB Gill**; Lauren Laverne	**Gabby Logan**; **Clara Amfo**
14–18 April	**Alex Scott**; Alex Jones	**JB Gill**; Alex Jones		Roman Kemp; Alex Jones	**Scott Mills**; **Clara Amfo**
21–25 April	Roman Kemp; **Clara Amfo**	**Clara Amfo**; Alex Jones	**JB Gill**; Alex Jones	Roman Kemp; Alex Jones	
28 April–2 May	Roman Kemp; Alex Jones	**Angellica Bell**; Alex Jones	**JB Gill**; Alex Jones	Roman Kemp; Alex Jones	Roman Kemp; **Clara Amfo**
5–9 May	Roman Kemp; Alex Jones; **VE Day Special**	**Clara Amfo**; Alex Jones	**JB Gill**; Alex Jones	Lauren Laverne; Alex Jones	Roman Kemp; Alex Jones
12–16 May	Roman Kemp; Alex Jones	Roman Kemp; Lauren Laverne	**Angellica Bell**; Alex Jones	Roman Kemp; Alex Jones	
19–23 May	Roman Kemp; Alex Jones	**Clara Amfo**; Alex Jones	**JB Gill**; Alex Jones	Roman Kemp; **Angellica Bell**	**No show** **(RHS Chelsea Flower Show)**
26–30 May	Roman Kemp; Alex Jones	**JB Gill**; Lauren Laverne	**JB Gill**; **Clara Amfo**	Roman Kemp; Lauren Laverne	Roman Kemp; **Clara Amfo**
2–6 June	Roman Kemp; Alex Jones	**Clara Amfo**; Alex Jones	**Vernon Kay**; Alex Jones	Roman Kemp; Alex Jones	
9–13 June	Roman Kemp; Alex Jones	Lauren Laverne; Alex Jones	**Angellica Bell**; Alex Jones	Roman Kemp; Alex Jones	**Clara Amfo**; Alex Jones
16–20 June	Roman Kemp; Alex Jones	**Clara Amfo**; Alex Jones	**JB Gill**; Alex Jones	Roman Kemp; Alex Jones	Roman Kemp; Lauren Laverne
23–27 June	Roman Kemp; Alex Jones		**Clara Amfo**; Alex Jones	Roman Kemp; Alex Jones	**Vernon Kay**; Alex Jones
30 June–4 July	**No shows: Summer Break** **(Wimbledon, Women's Euro 2025 & Our Lives)**				
7–11 July	**No shows: Summer Break** **(Wimbledon, Women's Euro 2025 & Our Lives)**				
14–18 July	**No shows: Summer Break** **(Wimbledon, Women's Euro 2025 & Our Lives)**				
21–25 July	**No shows: Summer Break** **(Wimbledon, Women's Euro 2025 & Our Lives)**				
28 July–1 August	**JB Gill**; Alex Jones		**Clara Amfo**; Alex Jones	**Vernon Kay**; Alex Jones	**Clara Amfo**; Alex Jones
4–8 August	Ronan Keating; Alex Jones	**Clara Amfo**; Alex Jones	**Vernon Kay**; Alex Jones	Roman Kemp; Alex Jones	
11–15 August	Roman Kemp; **Alex Scott**	Roman Kemp; Lauren Laverne	Roman Kemp; **Clara Amfo**		**Angellica Bell**; **Clara Amfo**
18–22 August	Roman Kemp; **Clara Amfo**		**Vernon Kay**; **Clara Amfo**	Roman Kemp; **Clara Amfo**	**No show** **(Women's Rugby World Cup)**
25–29 August	**No show: Bank Holiday** **(Military Tattoo)**	Roman Kemp; Lauren Laverne	Roman Kemp; **Clara Amfo**		**JB Gill**; Lauren Laverne
1–5 September	**Clara Amfo**; Alex Jones	Roman Kemp; Alex Jones	**Vernon Kay**; Alex Jones	Roman Kemp; Alex Jones	**JB Gill**; Lauren Laverne
8–12 September	Roman Kemp; **Angellica Bell**	Lauren Laverne; Alex Jones	**Angellica Bell**; **Clara Amfo**	Roman Kemp; Alex Jones	**JB Gill**; **Clara Amfo**
15–19 September	Roman Kemp; Alex Jones		**Vernon Kay**; Alex Jones	Roman Kemp; Lauren Laverne	**Clara Amfo**; Alex Jones
22–26 September	Roman Kemp; Alex Jones	Roman Kemp; Lauren Laverne	**Clara Amfo**; Alex Jones	Roman Kemp; Alex Jones	**Clara Amfo**; Alex Jones
29 September–3 October	Roman Kemp; Alex Jones	**Angellica Bell**; **Clara Amfo**	**Vernon Kay**; Alex Jones	**Angellica Bell**; Alex Jones	**Angellica Bell**; **Clara Amfo**
6–10 October	Roman Kemp; Alex Jones	Lauren Laverne; Alex Jones	**Vernon Kay**; Alex Jones	Roman Kemp; Alex Jones	Lauren Laverne; Alex Jones
13–17 October	Roman Kemp; Alex Jones		**Vernon Kay**; Alex Jones	Roman Kemp; Alex Jones	**JB Gill**; **Clara Amfo**
20–24 October	Roman Kemp; Alex Jones	Lauren Laverne; **Clara Amfo**	**Clara Amfo**; Alex Jones	Roman Kemp; Lauren Laverne	**Clara Amfo**; Alex Jones
27–31 October	**Vernon Kay**; **Clara Amfo**	Lauren Laverne; **Gabby Logan**	**JB Gill**; **Gabby Logan**	**Vernon Kay**; **Clara Amfo**	**JB Gill**; **Clara Amfo**
3–7 November	Lauren Laverne; Alex Jones	**Vernon Kay**; Alex Jones	**Clara Amfo**; Alex Jones	**Scott Mills**; Alex Jones	**Clara Amfo**; Alex Jones
10–14 November	**Angellica Bell**; Alex Jones	**Scott Mills**; **Angellica Bell**	**Angellica Bell**; Alex Jones	**Scott Mills**; **Clara Amfo**	**No show** **(Children in Need)**
17–21 November	Roman Kemp; Alex Jones	**Clara Amfo**; Alex Jones	Roman Kemp; Alex Jones		**Scott Mills**; **Clara Amfo**
24–28 November	**Angellica Bell**; Alex Jones		**Vernon Kay**; Lauren Laverne	Roman Kemp; Alex Jones	**Clara Amfo**; Alex Jones
1–5 December	Roman Kemp; Alex Jones	Lauren Laverne; Alex Jones	**Clara Amfo**; Alex Jones	**JB Gill**; Alex Jones	**Clara Amfo**; Alex Jones
8–12 December	Roman Kemp; Alex Jones	**Clara Amfo**; Alex Jones	**Vernon Kay**; Alex Jones	Roman Kemp; **JB Gill**	**JB Gill**; Lauren Laverne
15–19 December	Roman Kemp; Alex Jones	Lauren Laverne; Alex Jones	**Clara Amfo**; Alex Jones	**No Show** **(SPOTY)**	**Clara Amfo**; Alex Jones

2026
Week	Monday	Tuesday	Wednesday	Thursday	Friday
5–9 January	Lauren Laverne; **Angellica Bell**		**Gethin Jones**; **Angellica Bell**	**JB Gill**; **Angellica Bell**	
12–16 January	Roman Kemp; **Clara Amfo**	Roman Kemp; Lauren Laverne	**Vernon Kay**; **Angellica Bell**	Roman Kemp; Lauren Laverne	**JB Gill**; **Clara Amfo**
19–23 January	Roman Kemp; Alex Jones	Lauren Laverne; Alex Jones	**Clara Amfo**; Alex Jones	Roman Kemp; Alex Jones	**JB Gill**; Alex Jones
26–30 January	Roman Kemp; Alex Jones		**Vernon Kay**; Alex Jones	Roman Kemp; Alex Jones	**JB Gill**; **Clara Amfo**
2–6 February	Roman Kemp; Alex Jones	Lauren Laverne; Alex Jones	**JB Gill**; Alex Jones	Roman Kemp; Alex Jones	**JB Gill**; **Angellica Bell**
9–13 February	Roman Kemp; Alex Jones		**Vernon Kay**; Alex Jones	Roman Kemp; Alex Jones	**JB Gill**; Lauren Laverne
16–20 February	Roman Kemp; Alex Jones	Lauren Laverne; Alex Jones	**Clara Amfo**; Alex Jones	Roman Kemp; Alex Jones	**JB Gill**; **Clara Amfo**
23–27 February	Roman Kemp; Alex Jones		**Vernon Kay**; **Tess Daly**	Roman Kemp; Alex Jones	**JB Gill**; **Clara Amfo**
2–6 March	Roman Kemp; Alex Jones	Lauren Laverne; Alex Jones	**Clara Amfo**; Alex Jones	Roman Kemp; Alex Jones	
9–13 March	Roman Kemp; Alex Jones		**Vernon Kay**; **Clara Amfo**	Roman Kemp; **Clara Amfo**	**JB Gill**; **Clara Amfo**
16–20 March	Roman Kemp; Alex Jones	**Angellica Bell**; Alex Jones	**Clara Amfo**; Alex Jones	Roman Kemp; Alex Jones	**No show** **(Comic Relief)**
23–27 March	**JB Gill**; Alex Jones		**Vernon Kay**; **Clara Amfo**	**JB Gill**; **Clara Amfo**	
30 March–3 April	**JB Gill**; Lauren Laverne		**JB Gill**; **Angellica Bell**	**Angellica Bell**; **Clara Amfo**	**JB Gill**; **Angellica Bell**
6–10 April	**No show** **(Easter Monday)**	**Clara Amfo**; Alex Jones	**JB Gill**; Alex Jones	Roman Kemp; Alex Jones	**JB Gill**; Alex Jones
13–17 April	Roman Kemp; Alex Jones			**JB Gill**; Alex Jones	
20–24 April	Roman Kemp; Alex Jones		**Vernon Kay**; Alex Jones	Roman Kemp; Alex Jones	Lauren Laverne; **Angellica Bell**
27 April–1 May	Roman Kemp; Alex Jones		**Vernon Kay**; Alex Jones	Roman Kemp; Alex Jones	**Clara Amfo**; Alex Jones
4–8 May	Roman Kemp; **JB Gill**	Roman Kemp; Alex Jones	**JB Gill**; Alex Jones	Roman Kemp; Alex Jones	**No show** **(Election 26)**
11–15 May	Roman Kemp; Alex Jones		**Vernon Kay**; **Alex Scott**	Roman Kemp; Alex Jones	**Clara Amfo**; Alex Jones
18–22 May	Roman Kemp; Alex Jones	**Vernon Kay**; Alex Jones	**Angellica Bell**; **Clara Amfo**	Roman Kemp; Alex Jones	**No show** **(RHS Chelsea Flower Show)**
25–29 May	Roman Kemp; Alex Jones		**JB Gill**; **Angellica Bell**	**Vernon Kay**; Lauren Laverne	**JB Gill**; Lauren Laverne
1–5 June	Roman Kemp; **JB Gill**		**Angellica Bell**; Alex Jones	Roman Kemp; Alex Jones	
8–12 June	**JB Gill**; Alex Jones	Roman Kemp; Alex Jones	**JB Gill**; **Angellica Bell**	Roman Kemp; Alex Jones	Roman Kemp; **Clara Amfo**
15–19 June	Roman Kemp; Alex Jones		**No Show** **(FIFA World Cup)**	Roman Kemp; Alex Jones	
22–26 June	**No Show** **(FIFA World Cup)**	Roman Kemp; Alex Jones	**Vernon Kay**; Alex Jones	Roman Kemp; Alex Jones	**JB Gill**; Alex Jones
29 June–3 July	**No shows: Summer Break** **(Wimbledon, 2026 World Cup & Our Lives)**				
6–10 July	**No shows: Summer Break** **(Wimbledon, 2026 World Cup & Our Lives)**				
13–17 July	**No shows: Summer Break** **(Wimbledon, 2026 World Cup & Our Lives)**				
20–24 July	**No shows: Summer Break** **(Wimbledon, 2026 World Cup & Our Lives)**				
27–31 July	**Vernon Kay**; Alex Jones			**Clara Amfo**; Alex Jones	**JB Gill**; **Clara Amfo**
3–7 August	Roman Kemp; Alex Jones	Lauren Laverne; Alex Jones	**Vernon Kay**; Alex Jones	Roman Kemp; Alex Jones	
10–14 August	Roman Kemp; Alex Jones				Roman Kemp; Alex Jones; **The One Show at 20**
17–21 August	Roman Kemp; Lauren Laverne		**JB Gill**; **Clara Amfo**	Roman Kemp; **Clara Amfo**	**JB Gill**; **Angellica Bell**
24–28 August	Roman Kemp; Lauren Laverne	**JB Gill**; **Angellica Bell**	**JB Gill**; **Clara Amfo**	Lauren Laverne; **Angellica Bell**	
31 August–4 September	**No show: Bank Holiday** **(Military Tattoo)**	Lauren Laverne; Alex Jones	**JB Gill**; Alex Jones	**Clara Amfo**; Alex Jones	
7–11 September	**JB Gill**; Alex Jones	**Vernon Kay**; Alex Jones		**JB Gill**; Alex Jones	**JB Gill**; TBC

== Guest presenters episode count ==
The following have guest presented episodes of The One Show

- Leslie Ash
- Gabby Logan (2009–2010, 2013–)
- Chris Hollins (2010, 2016)
- Matt Allwright (2010–2017)
- Louise Minchin (2010–2014)
- Paul Merton (2010)
- Anita Rani (2011–12, 2014, 2016, 2018, 2023–25; 16 episodes)
- Aled Jones (2011; 1 episode)
- Joe Crowley (2011–12; 2016, 9 episodes)
- Zoe Ball (2012–13, 2016–17, 2021–present; 17 episodes)
- Jake Humphrey (2012–13; 5 episodes)
- Sarah Millican (2013; 2 episodes)
- Julia Bradbury (2013; 4 episodes)
- Michael Ball (2013, 2016–21; 63 episodes)
- Tess Daly (2013; 2026 2 episodes)
- Fearne Cotton (2013, 2014, 2016; 8 episodes)
- Jo Brand (2014; 2 episodes)
- Vernon Kay (2014, 2016; 2024; 10 episodes)
- Richard Madeley (2014, 2016; 2 episodes)
- Eddie Mair (2014; 4 episodes)
- Angellica Bell (2014–present; 103 episodes)
- Richard Osman (2014–17; 9 episodes)
- Terry Wogan (2014; 1 episode)
- Patrick Kielty (2014–20; 56 episodes)
- Nick Grimshaw (2014–19; 7 episodes)
- Mel Giedroyc (2014–19; 11 episodes)
- Denise Lewis (2015–16; 3 episodes)
- Shane Richie (2015–20; 7 episodes)
- James Martin (2015; 2 episodes)
- Dan Walker (2015, 2018; 3 episodes)
- Ore Oduba (2015–20; 32 episodes)
- Richard Blackwood (2015; 2 episodes)
- Adil Ray (2015–16; 5 episodes)
- Chris Evans (2015; 1 episode)
- Warwick Davis (2015; 2 episodes)
- Ed Byrne (2015; 1 episode)
- Geri Halliwell (2015; 1 episode)
- Paul Hollywood (2015; 1 episode)
- Will Young (2015; 1 episode)
- Ricky Wilson (2015–17; 4 episodes)
- Jasper Carrott (2015; 1 episode)
- Nina Wadia (2016; 4 episodes)
- Rory Bremner (2016; 1 episode)
- Anton du Beke (2016; 1 episode)
- Omid Djalili (2016; 1 episode)
- Jeremy Vine (2016–18; 5 episodes)
- Dermot O'Leary (2016; 2 episodes)
- Konnie Huq (2016; 1 episode)
- Greg James (2016–19; 7 episodes)
- Craig Charles (2016; 2 episodes)
- Bradley Walsh (2016; 1 episode)
- Josh Groban (2016, 2018; 2 episodes)
- Gyles Brandreth (2016–20; 9 episodes)
- Angela Scanlon (2016–23; 98 episodes)
- Jerry Springer (2016–18; 3 episodes)
- Ade Adepitan (2016, 2018–19; 4 episodes)
- Brenda Emmanus (2016; 1 episode)
- Jack Docherty (2016; 2 episodes)
- Bill Turnbull (2016; 3 episodes)
- Michelle Ackerley (2016–24; 109 episodes)
- Steve Davis (2016; 1 episode)
- John Barrowman (2016; 1 episode)
- Al Murray (2016–18; 5 episodes)
- Fay Ripley (2016–17; 3 episodes)
- Caroline Quentin (2016; 1 episode)
- Jon Richardson (2016–18; 5 episodes)
- Katherine Ryan (2017; 1 episode)
- Si King (2017; 1 episode)
- Dave Myers (2017; 1 episode)
- Amol Rajan (2017–2021; 84 episodes)
- Ronan Keating (2017, 2020–2021; 29 episodes)
- Sally Phillips (2017–18; 4 episodes)
- Kevin Duala (2017–18; 2 episodes)
- Rob Beckett (2017–2020; 3 episodes)
- Dev Griffin (2018–20; 4 episodes)
- Sandi Toksvig (2018; 2 episodes)
- Rory Reid (2018; 1 episode)
- Joe Lycett (2018–19; 2 episodes)
- Sara Cox (2018; 2 episodes)
- Angela Griffin (2018; 5 episodes)
- Susan Calman (2018; 2 episodes)
- Marvin Humes (2018–19; 5 episodes)
- Rylan (2019–2022; 42 episodes)
- Joe Sugg (2019; 1 episode)
- Oti Mabuse (2019, 2021; 2 episodes)
- Ashley Banjo (2019; 1 episode)
- Peter Andre (2019; 1 episode)
- Stacey Dooley (2019; 5 episodes)
- Alex Scott (2019–present; 78 episodes)
- Emma Willis (2019, 2021–2023; 36 episodes)
- Jo Whiley (2019; 1 episode)
- Sue Perkins (2019; 1 episode)
- Frank Skinner (2019; 1 episode)
- Clara Amfo (2019, 2021–2022; 15 episodes)
- Jamie Cullum (2019; 1 episode)
- Ashley John-Baptiste (2019; 1 episode)
- Chris Kamara (2019, 1 episode)
- Gethin Jones (2009, 2019–present; 73 episodes)
- Chris Ramsey (2020; 18 episodes)
- Iain Stirling (2019; 4 episodes)
- Huw Edwards (2020; 1 episode)
- Kym Marsh (2020; 6 episodes)
- Jermaine Jenas (2020–2021; 31 episodes)
- Riyadh Khalaf (2020; 1 episode)
- Carl Hutchinson (2020; 1 episode)
- Harry Judd (2020–2024; 28 episodes)
- Jordan Banjo (2021; 1 episode)
- Martin Clunes (2021; 1 episode)
- Sam Quek (2021; 18 episodes)
- Michelle Visage (2021; 1 episode)
- Lauren Laverne (2021–2023; 46 episodes)
- Tom Daley (2021, 2022; 3 episodes)
- JJ Chalmers (2021; 1 episode)
- Roman Kemp (2022–2023; 49 episodes)
- Craig Revel Horwood (2022; 1 episode)
- Vick Hope (2023–2025; 3 episodes)
- Paddy McGuinness (2024; 1 episode)
- JB Gill (2025; 1 episode)
