= Bacon's College =

Location
- Timber Pond Road; Rotherhithe; London, SE16 6AT; England
- Coordinates: 51.50195°N 0.0411°W

Information
- Type: Academy
- Motto: Gloria in Excelsis Deo
- Religious affiliation: Church of England
- Established: 1703; 323 years ago
- Local authority: Southwark
- Trust: United Learning
- Department for Education URN: 145313 Tables
- Ofsted: Reports
- Headmaster: James Wilson
- Gender: Co-educational
- Age: 11 to 19
- Website: http://www.baconscollege.co.uk/

Bacon's College is a co-educational secondary school and sixth form located in Rotherhithe, London, England. It was previously a City Technology College, but officially changed to academy status in 2007.

== History ==
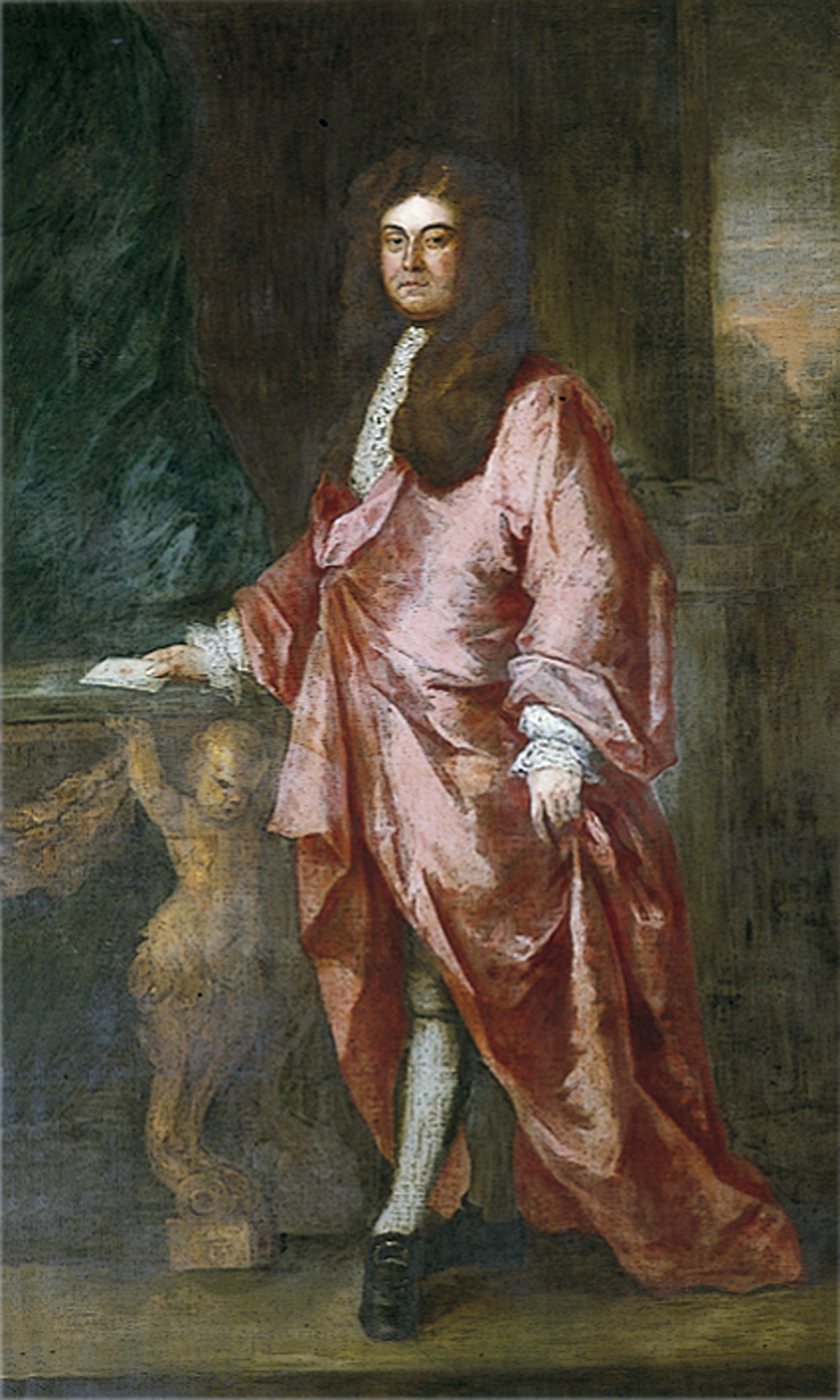
In 1703, Josiah Bacon, founded the school that became Bacon's College.

Founded in 1703 by Josiah Bacon, a fellmonger, its first location was above the porch of St Mary Magdalen, Bermondsey, as Bacon's School. It was relocated to nearby Grange Road in 1860 and was subsequently relocated in 1962 to Pages Walk as a mixed secondary modern school. As part of the redevelopment in Rotherhithe it became a CTC in a new campus. The college enjoyed its tercentenary in 2003, and held a Founder's Day service in St Paul's Cathedral to celebrate the event. Normally its Founder's Day service is held at Southwark Cathedral.

Bacon's College opened on its current Rotherhithe site in 1991, moving from its old building in Bermondsey. Bacon's College is a 11–19 Church of England school and became sponsored by United Learning in March 2018. The College opened in 1991 in the heart of Rotherhithe with a new building. Every year 180 students are admitted into the Academy.

Students of Bacon's College can use Bacon's College Community Centre, which includes a third generation astroturf football pitch, outdoor netball and tennis courts, indoor cricket nets, and a sports hall. The centre is available for private hire for weddings and conferences.

== Notable former pupils ==
- David Amoo, footballer who plays for Port Vale.
- Madeline Duggan, actress who played Lauren Branning on the BBC1 soap EastEnders
- Jade Goody, Big Brother contestant
- William Henry Gray, known as W. H. Gray (1808–1896), pioneer settler of South Australia.
- Dave Mehmet, footballer who played for Millwall
- Blake Harrison, actor who played Neil Sutherland in the E4 comedy The Inbetweeners
- David Haye, boxer
- Thomas Hicks, better known as Tommy Steele, singer and actor. Attended in the 1950s when the school was in Grange Road.
- Ashley John-Baptiste, BBC broadcast journalist and presenter
- Billy Mehmet, professional footballer who has represented the Republic of Ireland
- Roland Manookian, actor whose works include The Football Factory, Goodbye Charlie Bright, and The Business
- Frank Nouble, footballer who plays for Gateshead F.C.
- Ben Watson, Charlton Athletic footballer

== Sources ==
- Official website
- https://web.archive.org/web/20040728062319/http://www.dfes.gov.uk/cgi-bin/performancetables/dfe1x1_02.pl?Code=&Mode=Z&School=2106900
- https://web.archive.org/web/20090226190749/http://www.baconsmediacentre.co.uk/
- https://web.archive.org/web/20160304061313/http://www.baconscollege.co.uk/Assets/Uploaded/BaconsCollegeProspectus.pdf
