= Hip neu Sgip? =

- Created by: Fflic
- Presented by: Alex Jones; Alun Williams
- Country of origin: United Kingdom
- No. of episodes: Unknown

Production
- Production location: Various
- Running time: 25 minutes / 60 minutes

Original release
- Network: S4C
- Release: 2004 – 2011

Hip neu Sgip? (English: Hip or Skip?) is an S4C room makeover Welsh television programme for children and teens. It is shown on the Welsh-language children's television programming opt-out, Stwnsh.

== History ==
Commissioned by Siwan Jobbins in 2004 from an idea by Fflic production staff, Hip neu Sgip? was a vehicle for Alex Jones and a series of young designers.

Initially concentrating on bedrooms, Hip neu Sgip? expanded into large-scale projects in late 2008 by overhauling the Children's Ward play room at Ysbyty Glan Clwyd.

== Hip neu Sgip?: Yn erbyn y cloc ==
In 2011, Hip neu Sgip? was re-branded as Hip neu Sgip?: Yn erbyn y cloc (English: Hip neu Sgip?: Against the clock). It aired as eight 1 hour-long programmes. Alun Williams became the presenter and the team, including designer Leah Hughes and handymen, Iwan Llechid Owen, Gwyn Eiddior Parry and Ioan Thomas took on community-based challenges all over Wales. They used a number of suppliers from all over the UK ranging from major suppliers such as Litecraft to smaller ones like L&S Prints.

=== Broadcast dates ===
- 05/01/11: Ffostrasol Football Club, Ffostrasol
- 12/01/11: Ysgol y Strade, Llanelli
- 19/01/11: CeLL, Blaenau Ffestiniog
- 26/01/11: Ysgol Uwchradd Aberteifi, Cardigan (Cardigan High School)
- 02/02/11: Bontnewydd Community Hall, Caernarfon
- 09/02/11: Ysgol Dyffryn Teifi, Llandysul
- 16/02/11: The Urdd Centre, Aberdare
- 23/02/11: The Tabernacle Chapel Vestry, Llanrwst

== Presenters ==
- Alex Jones (2004–2011)
- Alun Williams (2011)
