= Alex Jones (Welsh presenter) =

Welsh television presenter (born 1977)

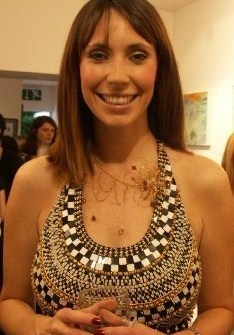
- Jones in 2008
- Born: Charlotte Alexandra Jones; 18 March 1977 (age 49); Ammanford, Carmarthenshire, Wales
- Education: Aberystwyth University
- Occupation: Television presenter
- Years active: 1998–present
- Employer: BBC
- Television: The One Show; Let's Dance for Comic Relief; Strictly Come Dancing; Tumble; Close Calls: On Camera; Shop Well for Less? The Masked Singer
- Height: 5 ft 6 in (1.68 m)
- Spouse: Charlie Thomson (m. 2015)
- Children: 3

Charlotte Alexandra Jones (born 18 March 1977) is a Welsh television presenter, best known for co-presenting the BBC One magazine programme The One Show. She presented Tumble (2014), Close Calls: On Camera (2015–2016) and Shop Well for Less? (2016–2020).

== Early life ==
Born Charlotte Alexandra Jones, in Ammanford, Carmarthenshire, she grew up in Tycroes, the daughter of Mary, a bank manager, and Alun Jones, a sales executive. She has a younger sister, Jennie. Her first language at home was English, but Jones was educated at Maes-yr-Yrfa, a Welsh language school, and is fluent in Welsh. After training as a ballet dancer as a child, Jones studied theatre, film and television at the University of Wales, Aberystwyth, sitting her final exams in Magaluf, Spain, while appearing as a contestant on the first series of Sky1 show Prickly Heat.

== Career ==
Jones became a television researcher after leaving university, but was sacked twice, once for mistaking Mike Peters from the band The Alarm for a workman who had come to fix the office alarm. She was asked by a producer at Avanti productions to audition in front of the camera at age 21. Her first presenting job was for BBC Choice, and she then joined S4C as a presenter on the singing programme Cân i Gymru (A Song for Wales). Jones developed a speciality presenting Welsh-language children's programmes on S4C, including Hip neu Sgip? and Salon, alongside occasional appearances on mainstream British television, including Channel 4's RI:SE.

Jones presented travel show Tocyn (Ticket) on S4C with Aled Samuel, the extreme sports show Chwa, and was part of the crew on Jonathan Davies's Welsh-language rugby show Jonathan for the 2010 Six Nations Championship. Jones was a regular co-host on Real Radio GMG in Wales.

On 25 July 2010, Jones was announced as the new female co-host on The One Show, replacing Christine Bleakley. Jones replaced Claudia Winkleman as co-presenter of Let's Dance for Comic Relief during the programme's third series in February 2011. She also was part of the BBC team for The Royal Wedding 2011 on 29 April 2011, reporting from Catherine Middleton's home town. Jones also presented the United Kingdom's points in the Eurovision Song Contest 2011.

Since 2012, Jones, along with Matt Baker and John Inverdale has co-hosted The Sport Relief Games Show, live coverage of the Sport Relief games that afternoon.

On 19 July 2014, Jones hosted the Live at Edinburgh Castle concert event on BBC One. Beginning on 9 August 2014, Jones presented the BBC One gymnastics competition series Tumble which ran throughout September 2014.

In 2015, Jones began presenting the daytime series Close Calls: On Camera for BBC One; in 2016, she began co-hosting the BBC series Shop Well for Less? alongside Steph McGovern. In September 2016, she fronted a one-off documentary Alex Jones – Fertility and Me for BBC One. She also presented The Secrets in My Family, a primetime documentary series for UKTV's W channel.

In 2026, Jones participated in the seventh series of The Masked Singer as "Disc Jockey". She was unmasked in the first episode.

=== Strictly Come Dancing ===
Jones competed in the ninth series of Strictly Come Dancing in 2011. Her professional partner was James Jordan. Jones and Jordan were eliminated a week before the final, and finished 5th overall in the competition.

== Personal life ==
Alex Jones talking in Welsh

In October 2011, Jones announced that she was dating a city worker called Charlie, from New Zealand, whom she had met at a birthday party earlier that year. His surname was first made public by the international press in September 2012, identifying him as insurance broker Charlie Thomson. On 6 February 2015, she announced their engagement live on The One Show. They married on 31 December 2015 at Cardiff Castle.

On 10 July 2012, Jones became a Fellow of Aberystwyth University.

Jones was appointed as a member of the Gorsedd of the Bards during a ceremony at the National Eisteddfod of Wales in Meifod, Powys, in August 2015; honoured for her contribution to Welsh culture.

In February 2016, Jones was granted a restraining order against a homeless man who sent her vulgar tweets and turned up at her workplace, claiming to be in love with her. He was banned from contacting Jones and her family.

On 2 September 2016, Jones announced via Twitter that she and her husband were expecting their first child; her last appearance on The One Show before her maternity leave was on 6 January 2017. On 26 January 2017, Jones announced via a live telephone call to The One Show that she had given birth to a baby boy on 22 January.

Later that year, Jones suffered a miscarriage.

In December 2018, she announced, live on The One Show, that she was pregnant again. Jones gave birth to a baby boy on 13 May 2019 at Queen Charlotte Hospital.

In March 2021, Jones announced on BBC's The One Show that she was pregnant with her third child. On 24 August 2021, it was announced that Jones had given birth to a baby girl on 21 August.

Jones lives in Sunningdale, Berkshire, having moved from Chiswick, west London, in the summer of 2024.

=== Charity ===
Jones is a patron for the Kidney Wales Foundation.

From 18 to 20 March 2014, Jones participated in the Sport Relief appeal by being dragged up the 1,200 ft Moonlight Buttress in Zion National Park, Utah in the US by climber Andy Kirkpatrick. Jones raised £1,281,476 for the charity appeal. Coverage of the challenge was shown on The One Show and in a 30-minute film which aired on 23 March 2014 on BBC One called Alex Against the Rock for Sport Relief.

From 7–11 March 2016, Jones took part in her second challenge for Sport Relief, called 'Hell on High Seas', in which she, along with five other celebrities: Suzi Perry, Doon Mackichan, Angellica Bell, Hal Cruttenden and Ore Oduba sailed 1,000 miles from Belfast to London. During the Sport Relief telethon, it was announced the team had raised £1,062,868.

== Filmography ==
Television

Year	Title	Role	Channel	Notes
1998	Prickly Heat	Contestant	Sky One	Appeared before becoming famous
Unknown	Cân i Gymru	Presenter	S4C	
Unknown	Chwa	Presenter	S4C	
Unknown	Johnathan			
Unknown	Popty	Presenter	S4C	
Unknown	RI:SE		S4C	
Unknown	Salon	Presenter	S4C	
Unknown	Tocyn	Co-presenter	S4C	With Aled Samuel
2004–2011	Hip neu Sgip?	Presenter	S4C	
2010—	The One Show	Co-presenter	BBC One	With Jason Manford (2010) with Chris Evans (2010–2014) with Matt Baker (2011–2020) with Jermaine Jenas (2021–2024) with Ronan Keating (2021–) with Roman Kemp (2023–) with Lauren Laverne (2023–)
2011	Royal Wedding 2011	Reporter	BBC One	
2011	Eurovision Song Contest 2011	United Kingdom points	BBC One	
2011	Strictly Come Dancing	Participant	BBC One	
2011–2013	Let's Dance for Comic/Sport Relief	Co-presenter	BBC One	With Steve Jones
2012, 2014, 2016	The Sport Relief Games Show	Co-presenter	BBC One	With Matt Baker
2014	Live from Edinburgh Castle	Presenter	BBC One	One-off TV special
2014	Tumble	Presenter	BBC One	
2015–2016	Close Calls: On Camera	Presenter	BBC One	Daytime series
2016	Alex Jones – Fertility and Me	Presenter	BBC One	One-off documentary
2016—2018	Shop Well For Less?	Co-presenter	BBC One	With Steph McGovern
2017—	The Secrets in My Family	Presenter	W	
2018	Make Wales Happy	Co-presenter	BBC One Wales	With Jason Mohammad
2018	The Royal Wedding of Prince Harry and Meghan Markle	Guest presenter	BBC One	
2020	The Great Stand Up to Cancer Bake Off	Contestant	Channel 4	
2022	Invictus Games	Co-presenter	BBC One	With JJ Chalmers
2023	Making Babies	Presenter	W	Ten-part series
2023	Saturday Kitchen	Guest presenter	BBC One	Two episodes
2023	Reunion Hotel	Presenter	BBC One	Five-part series
2026	The Masked Singer	Disc Jockey (contestant)	ITV	One episode, eliminated

Guest appearances

- Alan Carr: Chatty Man (2010)
- Pointless Celebrities (2011)
- Epic Win (2011)
- Loose Women (2011, 2014, 2018)
- Would I Lie to You? (2012, 2015, 2021, 2023)
- 12 Again (2012)
- Let's Do Lunch with Gino & Mel (2012)
- Room 101 (2013)
- 8 Out of 10 Cats (2013, 2014)
- What's Cooking? (2013)
- The Apprentice: You're Fired! (2013)
- That Puppet Game Show (2013)
- I Love My Country (2013)
- The Sarah Millican Television Programme (2013)
- The Chase: Celebrity Special (2013)
- The Michael McIntyre Chat Show (2014)
- W1A (2015)
- The Box (2015)
- Duck Quacks Don't Echo (2015)
- The TV That Made Me (2016)
- Michael McIntyre's Big Show (2016)
- The Hairy Bikers Home for Christmas (2017)
- Mary Berry's Christmas Party (2017)
- Richard Osman’s House of Games (2020)
- Sgwrs Dan Y Lloer (2022)
- Sunday Brunch (2023)
- The Wheel (2023, 2024)
- The Weakest Link (Christmas Special) (2023)
- Celebrity Catchphrase (2025)
- Homes Under the Hammer (Celebrity Special 2025)

Film

Year	Title	Role	Notes
2016	Absolutely Fabulous: The Movie	Cameo appearance	

Preceded by Christine Bleakley	co-host of The One Show; 2010–present	Succeeded by incumbent
