= Ashley John-Baptiste =

BBC broadcast journalist and presenter (born 1990)

Ashley John-Baptiste (born 1990) is a BBC broadcast journalist and presenter.

== Childhood and education ==
Baptiste was born in 1990 in Southwark, south London. From the age of two until he was 18, he grew up in four foster families and spent two years in a residential care home.

After attending three different primary schools, his secondary education was at Bacon's College, a comprehensive school in Rotherhithe with a higher than average proportion of pupils from troubled backgrounds. He was suspended several times, and had already been issued a final warning when the opportunity arose to visit a summer school organised by the Sutton Trust at Cambridge University. This was when he realised that he would have to take responsibility for himself and that he had the potential to succeed.

With the encouragement of his then foster parents and his MP, in 2008 he won a place at Fitzwilliam College, Cambridge, to read history, graduating in 2011 with an upper second. During this time, he mentored other students from similar backgrounds to his own.

== Career ==
Baptiste was a member of the band The Risk. In 2011, he quit the finals of ITV's X Factor to pursue a career in the media, and soon after obtained a place on the BBC creative access scheme and began working as a broadcast journalist.

- In 2012, he presented a BBC Three documentary Care Home Kids: Looking For Love.
- In 2012, he was the keynote speaker at an event organised by The PLACE (Project for Looked After Children's Education), an initiative of South Tyneside Council.
- In 2013, he was the keynote speaker at the Havering College of Further and Higher Education awards ceremony.
- In 2018, he was a reporter at the Fifa World Cup.
- In 2019, with Angelica Bell, he co-hosted an episode of The One Show, a British television magazine and chat show programme, and has since become a regular presenter.
- In 2019, with Kym Marsh, he co-presented 11 episodes of the documentary For Love or Money.
- In 2020, in the wake of the murder of George Floyd, he wrote a BBC News long-read article entitled "The Mangrove Nine: Echoes of black lives matter from 50 years ago".
- In 2020, with the Rev Kate Bottley, he co-hosted an 8-episode series for BBC Two called Stories Of Us.
- In 2020, he presented the BBC documentary Being Black at Cambridge.
- In 2020, he was named the first ever ambassador for the Royal Television Society (RTS) bursary schemes, which support those studying broadcasting and entertainment.
- In 2022, he presented the BBC documentary "Split up in care - Life without siblings" as part of his campaign for a change in the fostering laws.

From 2015 to 2018 he presented documentaries for the Victoria Derbyshire programme about the care system, children with facial deformities, and the Grenfell Tower fire, and has also made original documentary films on interfaith foster care and bullying.

He is currently an RTS-nominated BBC broadcast journalist and Digital Senior Reporter for BBC News.

He is an ambassador for The Fostering Network, a fostering charity.

He is the founder of Be Inspired, an organisation working in collaboration with Southwark Council, and Care Leaver Covenant, which have the aim of connecting care-experienced young people with each other and help them achieve their aspirations.

== Awards ==
In 2018 Baptiste was shortlisted for the Royal Television Society's Young Talent Of The Year Award.

== Personal life ==
Baptiste met his birth mother, who was a care leaver herself, at the age of 10 for the first time since going into care. He has never met his birth father. In his mid-20s, in spite of having been told by social workers that he was an only child, he found out for the first time that he had four older half-brothers on his father's side, one of whom he has met.

At the age of 14, his St Lucian foster mother took him to a Salvation Army church where he became involved in the youth group. This led to a moment in his faith journey when he prayed, "If you are real, I want you to be my Father". He credits his mindset of having potential and his sense of self-worth to having grown up in an environment where faith was very important.

Baptiste sings and plays the piano. He considers that music-making has been crucial to his personal development and well-being.

He is married to Joanna John-Baptiste, a maths teacher. The couple have two daughters, born in 2020 and 2022.
