= 2023 Invictus Games =

Multi-sport event in Düsseldorf, Germany

Invictus Games – Düsseldorf 2023
- Host city: Düsseldorf, Germany
- Nations: 21
- Debuting countries: 2
- Athletes: 513
- Opening: 9 September 2023
- Closing: 16 September 2023
- Opened by: Prince Harry, Duke of Sussex
- Main venue: Merkur Spiel-Arena
- Website: invictusgames23.de

The 2023 Invictus Games was an adaptive multi-sport event for wounded, injured and ill veteran and active defence personnel, that took place in Düsseldorf, Germany in September 2023, after having been postponed once. It was the sixth edition of the Invictus Games.

== Development and preparation ==
The games were scheduled to be held in 2022 in Düsseldorf, Germany. Following the postponement of the 2020 Games in The Hague to 2022, the Düsseldorf Games were postponed to 2023.

== The Games ==
=== Participating countries ===
Along with Colombia and Israel, Nigeria also made their debut at the 2023 games, becoming the first African country in history to join the Invictus Games. Iraq didn't participate in this iteration of the Invictus Games. The 21 participating countries are:

- Australia (31)
- Belgium (11)
- Canada
- Colombia
- Denmark
- Estonia
- France
- Georgia
- Germany (host)
- Israel
- Italy
- Jordan
- Netherlands
- Nigeria
- New Zealand
- Poland
- Romania
- South Korea
- Ukraine (25)
- United Kingdom
- United States

=== Sports ===
There are 10 adaptive sports contested at the Games.

- Archery
- Athletics
- Cycling
- Indoor rowing (14)
- Powerlifting
- Sitting volleyball (1)
- Swimming
- Table tennis
- Wheelchair basketball (1)
- Wheelchair rugby (1)

== Medalists ==
Stef Wolf Wolput Belgium Gold Athletics 400m IT1

Stef Wolf Wolput Belgium Gold Athletics 1500m IT1

Stef Wolf Wolput Belgium Silver Athletics 100m IT1

Stef Wolf Wolput Belgium Silver Athletics 200m IT1

Stef Wolf Wolput Belgium Silver Athletics 4x100m

Thierry Dutrieux Belgium Silver Athletics 4x100m

Michael Happaerts Belgium Silver Athletics 4x100m

Jean Bernard Matthieu Belgium Silver Athletics 4x100m

Martijn Mariale Belgium Bronze Athletics 100m IT2

Peter Caubergs Belgium Gold Cycling Time Trial IRB2

Peter Caubergs Belgium Gold Cycling Road Race IRB2

Stef Wolf Wolput Belgium Silver Cycling Time Trial IRB2

Thierry Dutrieux Belgium Bronze Cycling Road Race IRB2

Thierry Dutrieux Belgium Silver Indoor Rowing Sprint IRC3

666 medals were awarded in 229 competitions.

=== Medal table ===
* Host nation (Germany)

Rank	Nation	Gold	Silver	Bronze	Total
1	Ukraine (UKR)	12	14	8	34
2	Belgium (BEL)	4	5	2	11
3	United States (USA)	2	2	0	4
4	Great Britain (GBR)	2	0	0	2
5	Colombia (COL)	0	1	1	2
6	Canada (CAN)	0	0	1	1
Totals (6 entries)		20	22	12	54

== Media and broadcast ==
The BBC announced that it would stream the events on BBC iPlayer and Red Button.

== Later developments ==
Retired Canadian Armed Forces veteran Scott Snow, a member of Team Canada at the 2023 Invictus Games in Düsseldorf, filed a $2.4 million lawsuit in 2025 against Canada's Department of National Defence and the Canadian Armed Forces after suffering serious injuries in a wheelchair rugby match, alleging that veteran competitors lacked sports-injury insurance coverage. Following publicity surrounding his case, the Canadian government acknowledged the insurance gap and introduced coverage for veterans at future Invictus Games, though the policy was not applied retroactively. In a later interview, Snow criticised the response of the Invictus Games organisation and its founder, Prince Harry, stating that his attempts to contact Invictus leadership and Harry's office after the injury went unanswered.
