= 2025 Invictus Games =

Multi-sport event in Vancouver-Whistler

Invictus Games – Vancouver-Whistler 2025
- Host city: Vancouver; Whistler
- Nations: 23
- Athletes: 500+
- Opening: 8 February 2025
- Closing: 16 February 2025
- Opened by: Prince Harry, Duke of Sussex
- Main venue: Vancouver Convention Centre
- Website: invictusgames2025.ca

The 2025 Invictus Games was an adaptive multi-sport event for wounded, injured and ill veteran and active defence personnel, that took place in Vancouver and Whistler in February 2025. It was the seventh edition of the Invictus Games and the first to feature winter adaptive sports.

== Development and preparation ==
On 22 April 2022, Prince Harry announced that the 2025 games would take place in Vancouver and Whistler, Canada. It is the first edition of Invictus Games to feature winter adaptive sports, including alpine skiing, Nordic skiing, skeleton and wheelchair curling. The bid to host the games was submitted by True Patriot Love Foundation, in partnership with the Government of Canada, the province of British Columbia and the two Canadian municipalities and in partnership with the local Lil'wat, Musqueam, Squamish, and Tsleil-Waututh indigenous nations. The medal design for the games was conceived by artists of the four host First Nations, Levi Nelson, Mack Paul, Ray Natraoro, and Olivia George. Chris Martin, Katy Perry, Noah Kahan, Nelly Furtado and Roxane Bruneau performed at the opening ceremony, while Jelly Roll, Barenaked Ladies, and The War and Treaty headlined the closing ceremony.

The event's overall budget reached 63.2 million Canadian dollars. Tax filings indicate that public funding covered roughly half of Vancouver's expenses, with the federal government providing 15 million dollars through Veterans Affairs Canada and the government of British Columbia supplying another 15 million through its Ministry of Tourism, Arts and Sport. The rest of the financing was secured from around 40 corporate sponsors along with approximately 2.6 million dollars in private contributions.

== The Games ==
=== Participating countries ===
- Afghanistan, participating as "Afghan Unconquered" (Note: The 'Afghan Unconquered' team joined together with the nations of Invictus, for the first time in 2025, representing expatriate Afghans following the 2021 evacuation from Afghanistan. They represent the injured and disabled who served against the Taliban, who escaped, and are now able to compete.)
- Australia
- Belgium
- Brazil
- Canada
- Colombia
- Denmark
- Estonia
- France
- Georgia
- Germany
- Israel
- Italy
- Lithuania
- The Netherlands
- New Zealand
- Nigeria
- Poland
- South Korea
- Romania
- Ukraine
- United Kingdom
- United States
- Team Unconquered - an international team composed of players from the United States, Canada, Ukraine, Belgium, Colombia, New Zealand, the United Kingdom, France, & Lithuania

=== Sports ===
There were 11 adaptive sports contested at the Games.

- Alpine skiing
- Snowboarding
- Indoor rowing
- Biathlon (14)
- Nordic skiing
- Sitting volleyball (1)
- Skeleton
- Swimming
- Wheelchair basketball (1)
- Wheelchair curling (1)
- Wheelchair rugby (1)

== Media and broadcast ==
In Canada, TSN and CTV broadcast the opening ceremony and TSN also had a daily recap show. In the United Kingdom, ITVX broadcast the games.
