= JJ Chalmers =

British television presenter (born 1986)

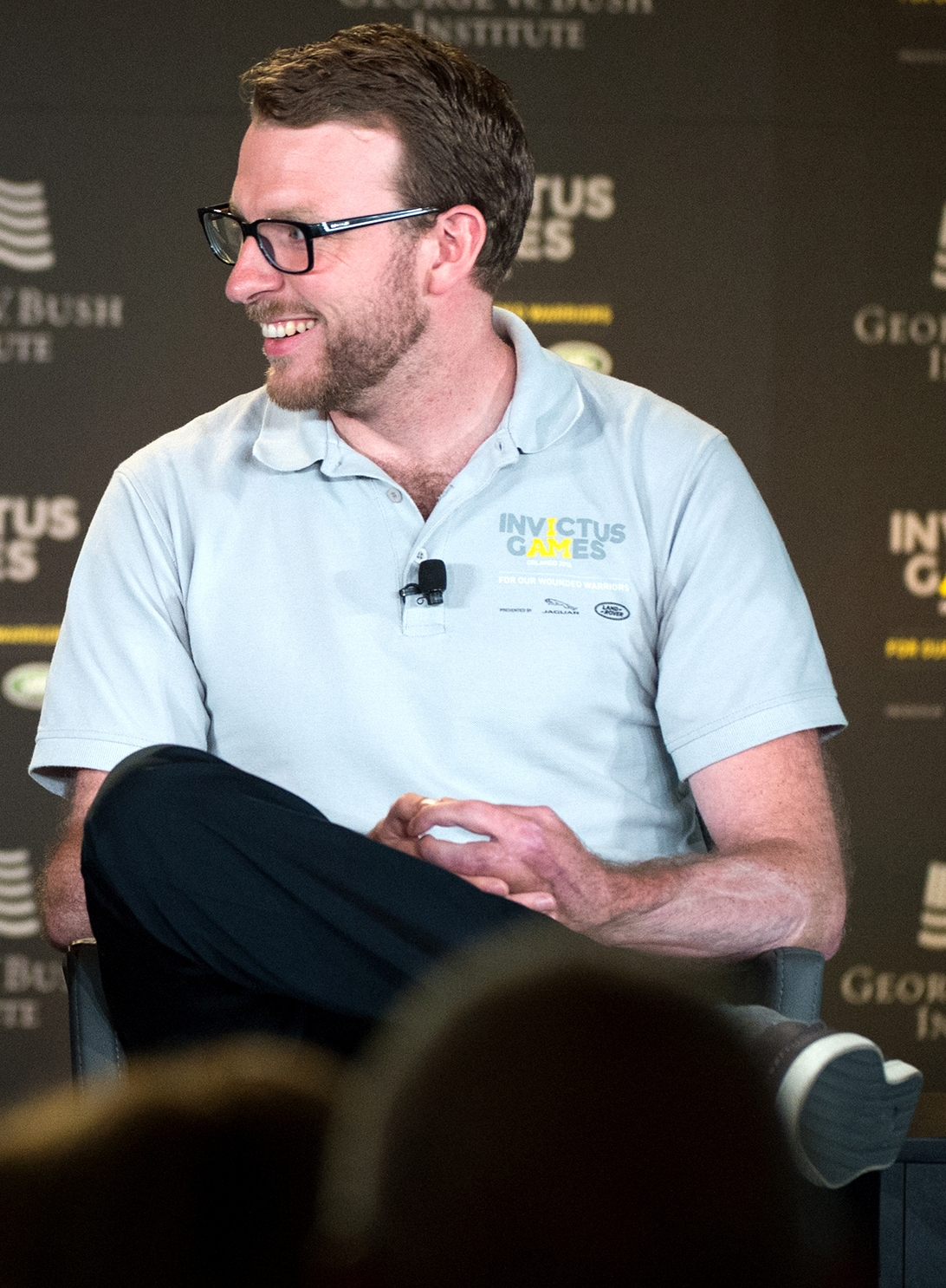
- Chalmers at the 2016 Invictus Games
- Born: John-James Chalmers; 20 December 1986 (age 39); Edinburgh, Scotland, U.K.
- Spouse: Kornelia Chalmers (sep. 2024)
- Children: 2
- Father: John Chalmers
- Military career
- Allegiance: United Kingdom
- Branch: Royal Marines
- Service years: 2005–16
- Rank: Lance corporal
- Unit: 42 Commando
- Conflicts: ISAF of Afghanistan
- Sports career
- Country: British Armed Forces
- Sport: Road cycling; Sprint running
Medal record
Invictus Games
Invictus Games
| Gold medal – first place | 2014 London | Recumbent road cycling |
| Bronze medal – third place | 2014 London | Recumbent road cycling |
| Bronze medal – third place | 2014 London | 4 × 100m mixed relay |

John-James Chalmers (born 20 December 1986) is a Scottish television presenter and Invictus Games medallist. He was injured in a bomb blast in Afghanistan in 2011, while serving as a Royal Marine.

== Early life ==
Chalmers was born on 20 December 1986 in Edinburgh, Scotland, the son of John Chalmers, Moderator of the General Assembly of the Church of Scotland from 2014 to 2015. He attended Strathallan School and studied at the University of Edinburgh, graduating as a Bachelor of Education. He worked as a craft, design and technology teacher at Balerno Community High School in Edinburgh.

He joined the Royal Marines Reserves whilst working as a teacher. As a Royal Marine, he served in Helmand Province, Afghanistan, attached to 42 Commando. In May 2011, he sustained severe injuries in an IED blast; he suffered facial injuries and lost two fingers, and his right elbow disintegrated. He remained in the Royal Marines during his rehabilitation until 2016.

== Invictus Games ==
In September 2014, Chalmers was a medal winner in non-amputee cycling for Britain at the Invictus Games. Captaining the trike team, he received a gold medal for the Men's IRecB1 Recumbent Circuit Race, as part of a British trio who crossed the finishing line together. Earlier that day Chalmers had already won a bronze in the 1-mile time trial. He also won a bronze medal in the 4 × 100m mixed relay race.

== Media career ==
Chalmers subsequently presented National Paralympic Day for Channel 4, as well as an online show for the 2015 IPC Athletics World Championships in Doha. In July 2016, he returned to the 2016 Invictus Games as an ambassador, telling his story at the opening ceremony as well as working with the BBC in their coverage of the games.

Chalmers featured on The Superhumans Show before travelling to Rio de Janeiro as a presenter for Channel 4's coverage of the 2016 Summer Paralympics, as well as appearing as a guest on The Last Leg series Live from Rio. After returning from Rio he hosted the Team GB Olympics and Paralympics Homecoming Parade in Manchester, alongside Mark Chapman and Helen Skelton.

Owing to his background as a Royal Marine, Chalmers presented The People Remember, with Sophie Raworth, a series shown throughout the week of remembrance, before appearing on the BBC's coverage of Remembrance at the Cenotaph.

Also in 2016 Chalmers was co-commentator of the Lord Mayor's Show on BBC One.

On 21 February 2017, Chalmers began presenting some of the sports segments on the BBC News channel and BBC Breakfast. He joined the BBC Sport Team, working as a presenter and reporter on events like the Great North, Great Manchester Run and The London Marathon. He also joined The One Show as a features reporter.

In 2017 Chalmers began working in radio, as part of BBC Radio 5 Live's, World Para Athletics coverage of London 2017, as well as presenting the Sports Journalists Award nominated radio documentary, To Helmand and Back. He ended the year presenting the 2017 Invictus Games, held in Toronto.

In 2018 he worked as a trackside reporter for BBC Sport at the World Athletics Indoor Championships, then as 5 Live's main reporter of the 2018 Winter Paralympics in Pyeongchang, before presenting for BBC Sport's coverage of the Commonwealth Games in the Gold Coast and the 2018 Invictus Games in Sydney.

At the Gold Coast 2018 Commonwealth Games, Chalmers was one of two presenters anchoring coverage live from Australia for the BBC. For the Birmingham 2022 Games, Chalmers presented a nightly highlights show alongside Isa Guha.

Away from sport, Chalmers took part in Pilgrimage: Road to Santiago, where seven celebrities undertook a medieval pilgrimage, across the North of Spain, to see whether it still has relevance today. He worked for the BBC on events such as Trooping the Colour and the commemorations to mark the 75th Anniversary of the D-Day landings. He narrated Scotland Remembers 100 Years of Armistice, a nationally broadcast service from Glasgow Cathedral.

In 2019, he was a part of the BBC's team working on RideLondon, 2019 UCI Road World Championships and Glasgow Track Cycling World Cup.

On 3 September 2020, it was announced that Chalmers would be taking part in the eighteenth series of Strictly Come Dancing. He danced with professional Amy Dowden. He was eliminated in the quarter finals of the competition, after losing the dance-off to Jamie Laing and Karen Hauer.

In March 2021, the BBC announced that Chalmers would be joining Sarah Moore and Jacqui Joseph as a presenter on Money For Nothing. In April, Chalmers was part of the BBC presentation team covering the funeral of Prince Philip, Duke of Edinburgh.

Chalmers presented overnight coverage of the delayed Tokyo 2020 Summer Olympics for the BBC. He was coincidentally flown out to Tokyo by the same pilot who flew him home from Afghanistan while Chalmers was in a medically-induced coma. For the Beijing 2022 Games, Chalmers presented an afternoon highlights show of the day's events. At the Paris 2024 Olympics, Chalmers anchored morning coverage of the games with Jeanette Kwakye. For the Milano Cortina 2026 Games, Chalmers presented coverage of the pre-Games curling action and reported from the sliding and curling events.

In early 2022 Chalmers presented Dunkirk: Mission Impossible; a three-part television series focusing on the events of Operation Dynamo, the evacuation of Allied soldiers during World War II from the beaches and harbour of Dunkirk. In April 2022 Chalmers appeared on BBC's Gardeners' World, introducing the garden at his family home of six years, in Fife, Scotland.

In November 2022, Chalmers was the anchor presenter for the BBC coverage of the Wheelchair Rugby League World Cup.

In August 2023, Chalmers co-presented The Royal Edinburgh Military Tattoo with Jennifer Reoch for BBC One.

In August 2024, Chalmers co-presented “Warship: Life in The Royal Navy” for Channel 5 with Julia Bradbury.

He was featured in December 2025 in the four-episode docudrama Titanic Sinks Tonight on BBC Two.

In April 2026, Chalmers co-presented “Warship: Life in The Royal Navy” for Channel 5 with Kate Humble. He reran the Royal Marine 6mile Endurance Run and completed it in 69minutes.

In August 2026, Chalmers appeared in “Celebrity Hunted” on Channel 4 in aid of Stand up to cancer. He appears on the show teamed up with TV Presenter & Disability Advocate Sophie Morgan.

== Personal life ==
Chalmers lives in Edinburgh where he co-parents his two children, Hayley and James, with his former wife, Kornelia; the couple "separated very happily" in 2024. His daughter Hayley's middle name is "Olivia", in honour of Ollie Augustin, a friend who was killed in the same IED blast that injured Chalmers.
