= Ukraine Prosthetic Assistance Project =

Ukraine Prosthetic Assistance Project - currently known as Protez Hub, is a project that aims at improving prosthetics and rehabilitation services in Ukraine through global exchange among the field specialists.

At least once a year, for three consecutive years to 2018, a team of prosthetic and rehabilitation specialists from a number of countries (USA, Canada, Great Britain, Australia) travel to Ukraine as volunteers to share their expertise with Ukrainian counterparts. They have worked collaboratively with Ukrainian specialists on fitting complex cases of limb amputations with appropriate prostheses and demonstrated the multidisciplinary approach to patient care, which is only starting to develop in Ukraine. Since the start of the full-scale Russian invasion of Ukraine, the specialists have been meeting online. The on the ground missions are set to resume as soon as possible and safe.

== History ==
Ukraine Prosthetic Assistance Project was founded by Antonina Kumka and an American CPO, Jon Batzdorff.

In 2014, due to the Russian military intervention in Ukraine, many military and civilians were severely wounded by shelling and landmines. Many lost one or more limbs. The Ukrainian prosthetists and healthcare professionals were not prepared for such high numbers of amputees with war-related injuries, which they have never had to deal with before. The government of Ukraine was gradually increasing funding for prosthetics, however no funds were allocated for professional development of the local specialists. Most of the amputees, especially with upper limb losses in 2014 ended up being sent abroad without proper medical follow up arranged for them upon their return to Ukraine.

Kumka decided to investigate a solution to the problem. She talked to some wounded Ukrainian soldiers and realized that many of them were not able to receive adequate prosthetic care and service in Ukraine due to lack of knowledge and exposure to a variety of prosthetic components and rehabilitation techniques of the Ukrainian specialists. Paying tens of thousands of dollars to send one amputee abroad for fitting was not a sustainable option.

After weeks of searching, Kumka contacted Jon Batzdorff, an American CPO and President of the American branch of International Society of Prosthetics and Orthotics. Batzdorff runs a non-profit, Prosthetika, which aims to deliver prosthetics related humanitarian help and education to countries where it is most needed. Batzdorff agreed to help.

In less than four months, a team of six specialists-volunteers (certified prosthetists, physiotherapists and occupational therapists) from Canada and USA was put together, 9 Ukrainian specialists-participants from across Ukraine were invited to be part of the training and seven Ukrainian amputees with complex cases (military and civilians, male and female) were selected to be fitted with functional upper and lower limb prostheses. The first mission took place at the end of April - beginning of May 2015, in Kyiv, Ukraine, under the umbrella of Canada-Ukraine Foundation and Ukrainian Canadian Congress Toronto Branch.

The second mission of the Project took place at the end of April 2016 in Lviv, Ukraine. The team of foreign specialists-volunteers consisted of representatives from Canada, USA and Great Britain, 15 Ukrainian specialists were trained and 10 amputees received functional prostheses and trained to use them effectively.

Between the missions a Canadian prosthetist, Chad Nilson, traveled to Ukraine a number of times as a volunteer to support the local specialists in providing follow-up care to those fitted during the project.

The third mission took place between July 23 – August 5, 2017 in Dnipro, Ukraine and focused on sports prosthetics and rehabilitation. Members of the Invictus Games: Team Ukraine were provided with high-performance prostheses. This mission was largely funded by the Embassy of Australia in Ukraine through their Direct Aid program.

In 2018, in partnership with the Victors project by Solomiya Vitvitska (a Ukrainian news anchor), Kumka organized a week long training for Ukrainian prosthetic specialists in Hamilton, Ontario, Canada. The team of 5 specialists participated in the hands on training and were exposed to organization of prosthetics and rehabilitation in Canada in general.

Most of the funding for the Project comes from donations, fundraising events, grants from partner organizations and donations/discounts by the prosthetics manufacturing companies. The team of foreign specialists normally consists of 6 -10 professionals, who travel to Ukraine as volunteers.

== Outcomes ==
During the first mission of the Project, myo-electric upper limb prostheses were introduced and fitted in Ukraine for the first time ever, Ukrainian specialists were introduced to patient-oriented, multidisciplinary approach to amputee care for the first time. and six Ukrainian amputees received myo-electric and body-powered upper limb prostheses and hydraulic lower limb prostheses; 10 specialists were trained in a hands-on setting on how to fit myo-electric upper limb prostheses and were shown how to teach amputees to use them effectively; 20 amputees received consultations; 50 Ukrainian specialists from across Ukraine attended one day seminar on fitting myo-electric and body-powered upper limb prostheses.

During the second mission of the Project, more training on fitting myo-electric upper limb prostheses was provided and three Ukrainian specialists from the eastern, central and western parts of Ukraine were officially certified to fit such prostheses. This certification was recognized by the government of Ukraine and the procedure was established by the government on how to reimburse the Ukrainian specialists for such prosthesis in Ukraine. The number of amputees who were being sent abroad to get such prostheses has decreased to 2 or 3 per year (as some of the cases are still too complex). 12 amputees received functional upper/lower limb prostheses and were taught how to effectively use them; 15 specialists were part of the hands-on training; more than 100 Ukrainian specialists attended one-day seminars on prosthetics and rehabilitation. During one of the visits of the Canadian prosthetists in between the mission, Ukraine Prosthetic Assistance Project arranged formal certification and training of 4 more Ukrainian prosthetists (making it 7 altogether) in fitting myo-electric hand and now also partial hand (digits) prostheses for the first time in Ukraine.

Olena Tsymbaliuk, Ukraine Prosthetic Assistance Project logistics and operations manager, has become an adviser to the committee (at the Ministry of Social Policy of Ukraine), responsible for establishing care pathways and opportunities for Ukrainian military amputees. This allowed the Project team to provide guidance to the Ukrainian ministry on how to better structure amputee services all across Ukraine and ensure transparency of the processes. The Project has claimed to bring systemic changes to the Ukrainian prosthetic industry.

As a result of the first two missions, the connections between Ukrainian specialists from different local facilities have been established and more local collaboration has started and is developing. Ukrainian specialists are now applying multidisciplinary approach to patient care. The Project has received a grant from the Embassy of Australia in Ukraine; a fundraiser was held by CUIA Fund; Prosthetika and World Rehabilitation Fund have financially supported the Project. The third mission took place on July 23 – August 5, 2017 and focused on sports and leisure prosthetics and related rehabilitation. Some of the amputees who received prostheses were members of Invictus Games: Team Ukraine and Ukrainian Paralympic Team. This was the first time in Ukraine that 20 Ukrainian prosthetists and rehabilitation specialists were trained in fitting and teaching amputees to effectively use sports and leisure prosthetic devices. Daily seminars were held to provide additional support to a greater number of specialists, interested in learning new approaches and tricks.

== Project development ==
Ukraine Prosthetic Assistance Project aims to address the immediate need in Ukraine, as well as brings long term results, providing the opportunity to both Ukrainian specialists and amputees to get better access to a variety of prosthetic components, devices, techniques and really understand the process of fitting and follow up.

Projected future steps include helping Ukrainian specialists develop stronger connections and establish peer to peer training opportunities through local conferences and webinars, continuing to support both the specialists and amputees with advice, organize more missions as needed and help establish a formal college or university education program for prosthetists.
