= Heart of Invictus =

2023 documentary series

- Promotional poster
- Genre: Documentary series
- Directed by: Orlando von Einsiedel
- Music by: Patrick Jonsson
- Country of origin: United States
- Original language: English
- No. of episodes: 5

Production
- Executive producers: Joanna Natasegara; Prince Harry, Duke of Sussex; Ben Browning; Chanel Pysnik; Lord Allen of Kensington; Sir Keith Mills; Dominic Reid; Orlando von Einsiedel; Abigail Anketell-Jones
- Producer: Joanna Natasegara
- Cinematography: Franklin Dow
- Editors: Michael Nollet; Raphael Pereira; Ian Davies; Alice Powell
- Production companies: Archewell Productions; Violet Films + Grain Media

Original release
- Network: Netflix
- Release: August 30, 2023

Heart of Invictus is a 2023 American documentary series set for streaming on Netflix. It was released on August 30, 2023.

== Background and production ==
In April 2021, it was announced that Archewell Productions' first project with Netflix would be Heart of Invictus, a documentary series in partnership with The Invictus Games Foundation. The project will surround the six competitors from the 2020 Invictus Games, directed by Orlando von Einsiedel and produced by Joanna Natasegara. Prince Harry, Duke of Sussex, founder of the Invictus Games, will executive produce the series and appear on camera. Other executive producers are Ben Browning, Chanel Pysnik, Lord Allen of Kensington, Sir Keith Mills, Dominic Reid, and Abigail Anketell-Jones.

The first trailer for the series was released on August 16, 2023.

== Episodes ==
No.	Title	Directed by	Original release date
1	Something Needs to Change	Orlando von Einsiedel	August 30, 2023
2	Invisible Injuries	Orlando von Einsiedel	August 30, 2023
3	One Step Forward, Three Steps Back	Orlando von Einsiedel	August 30, 2023
4	Group Therapy	Orlando von Einsiedel	August 30, 2023
5	Where the Light Enters	Orlando von Einsiedel	August 30, 2023

== Reception ==
The review aggregator website Rotten Tomatoes reported an 86% approval rating with an average rating of 8.0/10, based on 7 critic reviews. Writing for The Guardian, Lucy Mangan gave the series 4/5 starts in her review and described it as "moving and nuanced – even if Harry seems tempted to settle scores about his army career." Ed Power of The Daily Telegraph gave the series 3/5 stars and believed "While the struggles of the ex-military personnel profiled in the first instalment are hugely emotive, they ultimately and unfortunately function as filler between the Harry stuff – and it looks like everyone involved knows it." The series failed to make the Netflix Top 10 charts.

Some of the claims made by Harry in the series came under scrutiny. He stated that after returning from Afghanistan in 2012 "there was an unravelling" but "no-one around me could really help, I didn't have that support structure that network or that expert advice to identify what was actually going on with me." His statement was in contrast to comments he had previously made in 2017, when he credited his brother with encouraging him to seek therapy. Harry also suggested that the British media breached the blackout placed on details surrounding his deployment to Afghanistan, whereas it was an American website and an Australian women's magazine who revealed Harry's presence in Afghanistan. The docuseries received 300,000 views between its debut and the end of 2023, making it one of the year's least-watched "higher-profile" Netflix productions.
