= ESPN Wide World of Sports Complex =

Sports complex in Walt Disney World

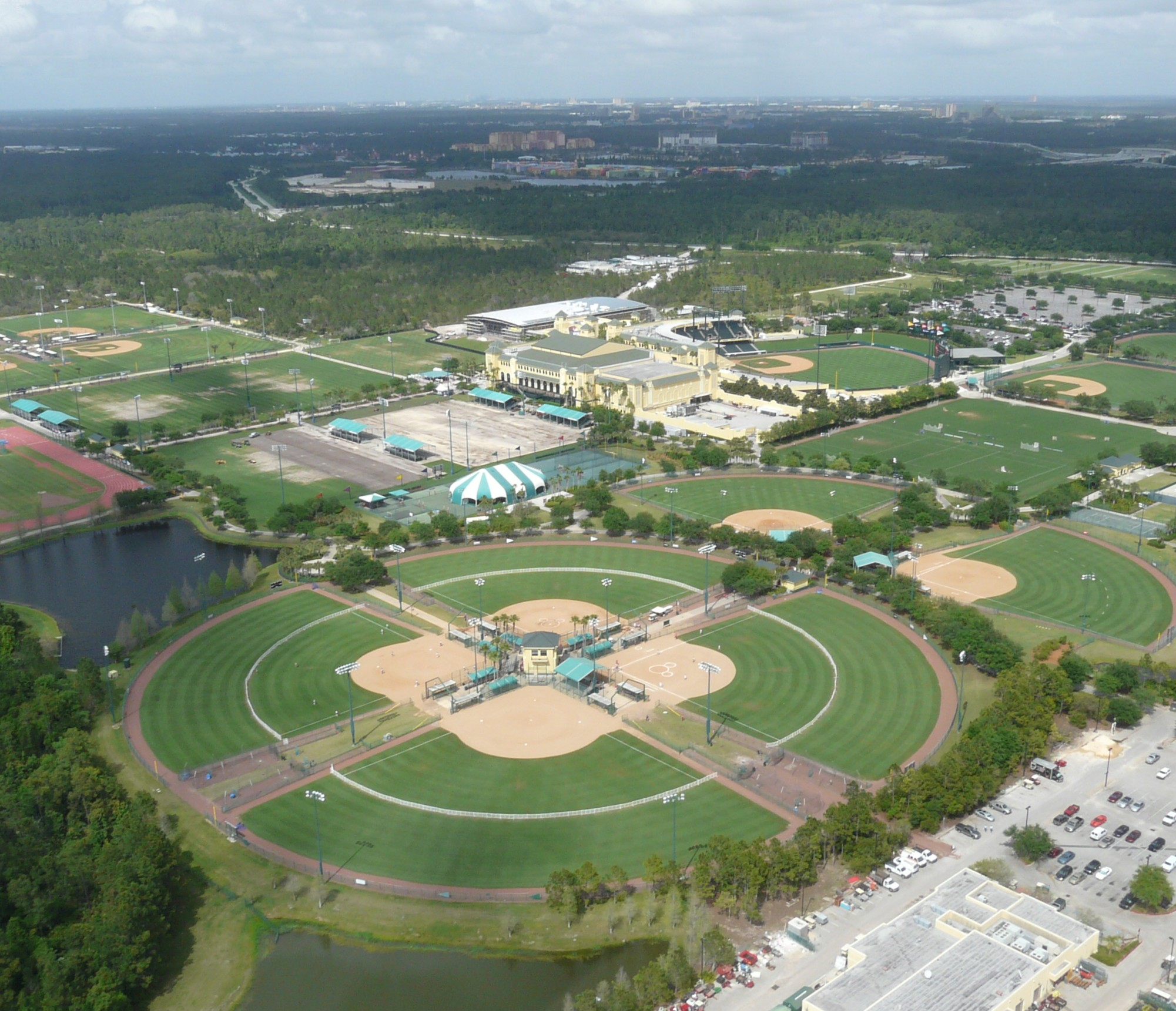
- Aerial view of the sports complex, 2008
- Interactive map of ESPN Wide World of Sports Complex
- Former names: Disney's Wide World of Sports Complex (1997–2010)
- Location: Walt Disney World
- Coordinates: 28°20′13.5″N 81°33′21.6″W
- Owner: Disney Experiences
- Operator: Disney Sports Enterprises

Construction
- Opened: March 28, 1997

Tenants
- ESPN Events Invitational (NCAA Basketball) (2006–present); Walt Disney World Pro Soccer Classic (MLS) (2010–14); Gulf Coast League Braves (Gulf Coast League) (1997–2019); Atlanta Braves (Grapefruit League) (1997–2019); MLS is Back Tournament (MLS) (2020); 2020 NBA Bubble Playoffs (NBA) (2020); 2020–21 NBA G League season (2021); Tampa Bay Rays (Grapefruit League) (2023)

Website
- disney.go.com/wide-world-of-sports

The ESPN Wide World of Sports Complex is an approximately 230-acre (90 ha) multi-purpose sports complex at Walt Disney World Resort in Osceola County, Florida, near Orlando. Opened on March 28, 1997, it features nine venues and hosts professional and amateur sporting events throughout the year, allowing families to combine tournament play with area vacations.

Originally named Disney's Wide World of Sports Complex from 1997 to 2010, the facility was rebranded after the Disney-owned ESPN. The name references the television program Wide World of Sports, which aired on the ABC network, which had been acquired by The Walt Disney Company in 1996.

The complex is used primarily for Amateur Athletic Union tournaments and has also hosted high-profile events, including the 2020 NBA Bubble, MLS is Back Tournament, 2016 Invictus Games, Pro Bowl skills competitions (2017–2020), the 1997 U.S. Men's Clay Court Championships, Atlanta Braves spring training (1997–2019), Tampa Bay Rays spring training (2023), and the 2022 Special Olympics USA Games.

== History ==
Disney built the US$100 million facility on former wetlands under the direction of Disney vice president Reggie Williams. Construction started in July 1995. The complex was built to publicize Walt Disney World, fill hotel rooms, grow sponsorship revenue, and build Walt Disney World's position as a sports destination.

=== Disney-branded ===
The venue opened on March 28, 1997, with an exhibition baseball game between the Atlanta Braves and the Cincinnati Reds. On April 21–27, the main tennis courts hosted the U.S. Men's Clay Court Tennis Championships. A grand opening was held May 15, 1997. The initial build out consisted of nine venues with a 10th, the Olympic velodrome, expected in the third quarter 1997. Initial tenants were Braves & its rookie team, the Harlem Globetrotters, NFL Experience, the U.S. Men's Clay Court Championships, Amateur Athletic Union, Official All Star Café and Northeastern University's Center for the Study of Sport in Society.^{:2} Disney bid for the Florida state high school football finals for 1997 but lost to Gainesville. In June 1999, the complex made a deal with the Florida High School Activities Association to host the state prep volleyball championships at the Disney Fieldhouse for three years. USA Trampoline and Tumbling Championships was held at the complex the weekend of June 7, 1997.

A former baseball umpire and an architect alleged that they approached The Walt Disney Company in 1987 with plans for a sports complex, and that Wide World of Sports, which opened 10 years later, was heavily based on their designs. Disney claimed that, while the designs had some similarities, the complex was also similar to numerous other sporting facilities, and the concept of a sports park was too generic for any one group to claim ownership. The two men, represented in part by noted attorney Johnnie Cochran, sued Disney in Orange County civil court. In August 2000, a jury returned a verdict for the plaintiffs with damages in the amount of $240 million, a fraction of the $1.5 billion sought. Disney appealed the judgment, and settled out of court in September 2002 for undisclosed terms.

With Planet Hollywood just out of bankruptcy, Disney offered to purchase its All Star Café located here in February 2000 and acquired the lease in March 2000. It became What's Next? Cafe in 2007 before being rebranded as ESPN Wide World of Sports Grill in 2010.

In August 2004, 20 acres of additional fields, four baseball diamonds with other multi-use fields, were added under the name of Hess Sports Fields. Plans for a 100 lane bowling stadium with restaurant was announced for the complex by Disney officials in May 2008. This stadium would be built and operated by a third party and was supposed to be completed in 18 months. About 13 United States Bowling Congress tournaments were expected for the facility.

=== ESPN-branded ===
During an ESPN the Weekend kick off event on February 25, 2010, the complex was rebranded as the ESPN Wide World of Sports Complex. It received a massive upgrade, having installed HD video scoreboards at several venues, a new complex-wide audio system, and a broadcast production facility. New venues and activities at the complex included the PlayStation Pavilion and Custom Tee Center by Champion.

Prior to the rebranding in 2007, Disney announced a 450-acre Flamingo Crossings hotel-and-retail development. It would be located near the area for complex visitors and budget-minded Disney World visitors. Shelved due to economic downturn, the project was revived with the 2013 sale of the property to first phase developer JL Properties Inc. of Alaska. An October 16, 2014, groundbreaking took place for the first phase, consisting of two Marriott International brand hotels which opened in January 2016.

From 2006 to 2008, the Disney Channel Games were held at the complex. Due to actor availability issues, The Disney Channel Games were cancelled in 2009 and onwards. From May 9–11, 2014, a WNBA pre-season tournament consisting of four teams was held alongside an AAU girls basketball tournament at the complex, with the Minnesota Lynx winning the tournament over the Chicago Sky 76–69. While the Citrus Bowl was under repairs, the Orlando City Soccer Club played its 2014 home games at the complex.

In July 2015, it was announced that the 2016 Invictus Games would be held at the complex. The Invictus Games were held from May 8 to 12, 2016. Prince Harry, Michelle Obama, and Morgan Freeman all spoke at the Opening and Closing ceremony. Over 500 service members were in attendance, along with other notable public figures, including former United States President George W. Bush and Second Lady Jill Biden.

In early January 2018, The Arena opened at the complex as its third indoor multi-purpose sports and entertainment arena. Also that month, United States Specialty Sports Association left for the Space Coast Complex in Viera, Florida ending its use of ESPN's complex.

Since 2017, the Complex is host of the NFL Pro Bowl activities prior to the game. Besides having open practices for fans, ESPN broadcasts the Pro Bowl Skills Showdown, a series of head-to-head competitions between the players. According to event organizers, over the last four years, the Pro Bowl and festivities surrounding it have generated an estimated $100-million economic impact for Central Florida.

In March 2019, it was announced that Wide World of Sports would host the 2022 Special Olympics USA Games.

=== Use as a bubble during the COVID-19 pandemic ===
In May 2020, due to the ongoing COVID-19 pandemic in the United States, there were reports that both Major League Soccer and the NBA were in talks with Disney to host the teams to have their respective seasons in the complex.

It was then confirmed that the complex would host both leagues. The 2020 Major League Soccer season held the MLS is Back Tournament, which had three regular season matches for each of the 26 teams as well as a bracket tournament to determine a berth into the 2021 CONCACAF Champions League (for a total of 54 matches), from July 8 to August 11. On August 11, 2020, the Portland Timbers defeated Orlando City SC 2–1 to win the tournament.

Meanwhile, the 2019–20 NBA season was concluded at the AdventHealth Arena, HP Field House, and the Visa Athletic Center. 22 teams were invited: the 16 teams in playoff position at the time of the season being put on hold due to the pandemic, including the host Orlando Magic, and the six teams within six games of the eighth and final playoff spot in either conference. The three chosen arenas hosted scrimmages, eight regular season games for each team invited to the NBA Bubble starting July 30, a play-in mini-series, and the entirety of the NBA Playoffs and Finals. On October 11, 2020, the Los Angeles Lakers defeated the Miami Heat 106–93 to win the best-of-7 series 4–2.

In 2021, the NBA G League reached an agreement to host the 2020–21 season exclusively at the complex. On March 11, 2021, the Lakeland Magic defeated the Delaware Blue Coats 97–78 to win the championship.

== Venues ==
=== The Stadium at the ESPN Wide World of Sports ===
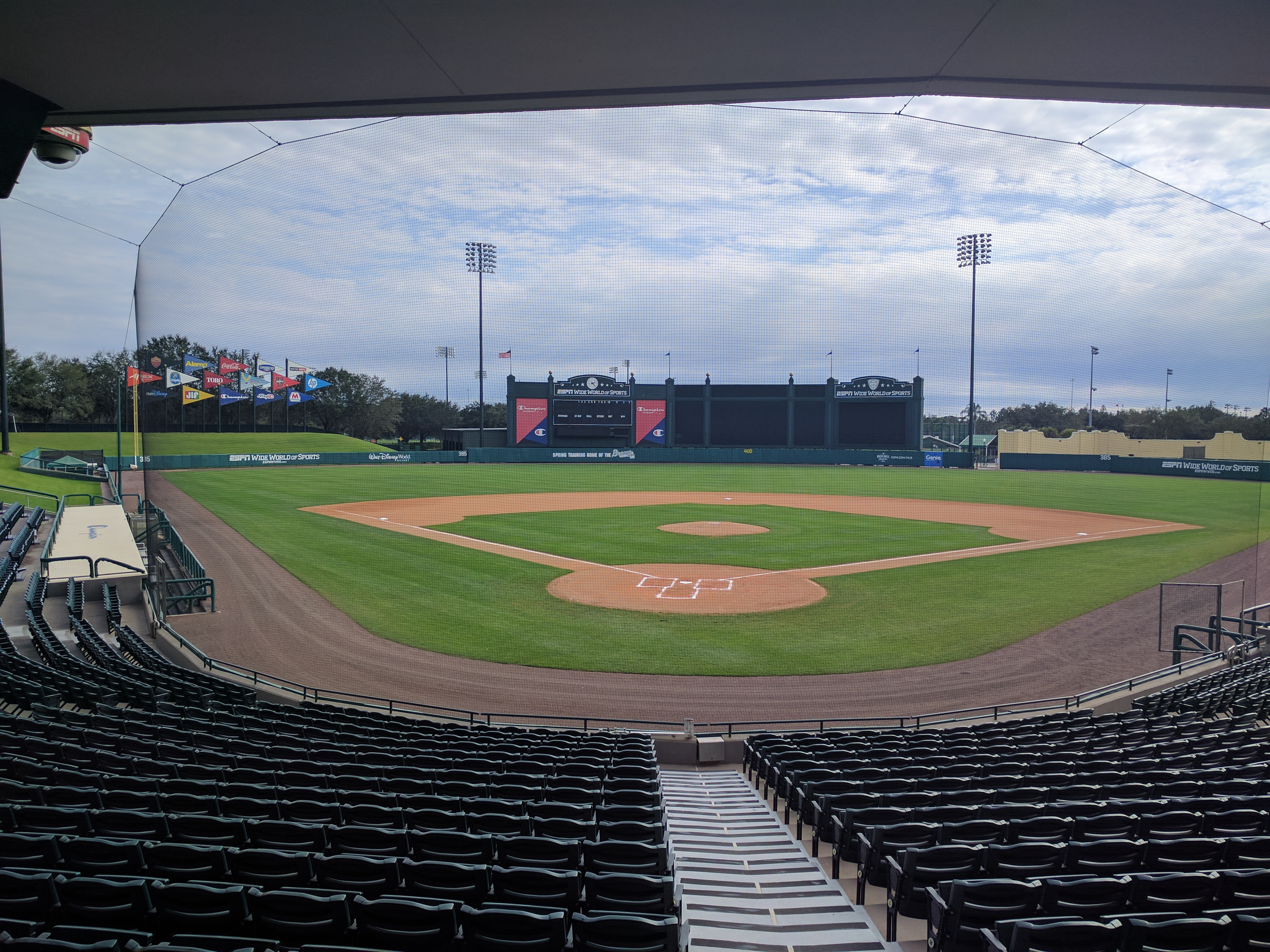
The Stadium at the ESPN Wide World of Sports

A 7,500 seat baseball stadium built in 1997 also has 2,000 more lawn seating. One of the original components of Wide World of Sports, it was formerly known as Champion Stadium, Cracker Jack Stadium and The Ballpark at Disney's Wide World of Sports. It was the spring training home of the Atlanta Braves from 1997 to 2019, and the recurring home for the Gulf Coast Braves. The Braves initially announced that 2017 would be their final year in the complex, but their departure would be delayed to 2019. In 2020, the Atlanta Braves officially moved their spring training site to CoolToday Park located in North Port, Florida after 21 years in the ESPN complex. The stadium has hosted two regular season Major League Baseball series in 2007 and 2008 featuring the Tampa Bay Rays as the home team.

=== State Farm Field House ===
A 5,000-seat multi-purpose arena, formerly the Milk House, Disney Fieldhouse and HP Field House, sponsored by State Farm. It hosts the ESPN Events Invitational college basketball tournament annually. The State Farm Field House has 50,000 square feet (4,600 m^{2}) with stadium style seating with the highest row 35 feet (11 m) off the floor. It also features a smaller gymnasium behind the main arena with retractable seating. It was formerly sponsored by the California Milk Processor Board, progenitors of the famous Got Milk? campaign. Beginning in 2018, the arena hosts the Jr. NBA Global Championship, a tournament that features both boys' and girls' teams divided into national and international regions (and is thus similar in setup to the Little League World Series). It also hosted the first-ever NBA play-in game between the Portland Trail Blazers and the Memphis Grizzlies in 2020 bubble basketball.

=== Visa Athletic Center ===
First announced in March 2007, the complex's 10th anniversary year, the Visa Athletic Center (formerly Jostens Center) is a 70,000-square-foot (6,500 m^{2}) arena (36% smaller than the HP Field House without the stadium seating) that opened in the fall of 2008. The center features six college-size basketball courts, twelve volleyball courts, or two roller hockey rinks. Its seating capacity is 1,200.

=== AdventHealth Arena ===
AdventHealth Arena opened in early January 2018 as the third indoor multi-purpose sports and entertainment arena at the complex. While multipurpose, the venue was designed for cheer and dance events. Its first event was the UCA and UDA College Cheerleading and Dance Team National Championship, January 12 to the 14, 2018. It has 8,000 seats in standard arena configuration, and features a flexible configuration that can accommodate six regulation-sized basketball or volleyball courts. AdventHealth Arena hosted the Eastern and Western Conference Finals of the 2020 NBA Playoffs, along with the 2020 NBA Finals.

=== Marathon Sports Fields ===
Marathon Sports Fields, presented by Marathon Petroleum, consists of twelve fields, the Baseball Quadraplex, Softball Quadraplex and four multiple purpose fields.

One of the fields has 500 permanent seats, and another has 1,000 permanent seats, expandable to up to 3,000 with additional grandstands. Field 17, the field with the larger grandstands, hosts the Walt Disney World Pro Soccer Classic, an annual eight-team preseason soccer tournament featuring Major League Soccer teams.

The complex hosted the USL Pro Orlando City Soccer Club during the 2014 season. The team had additional seating added for a total of 5,200 seats.

=== Complexes ===
==== Baseball Quadraplex ====
Consisting of four professional baseball fields and one practice infield, the quadraplex also includes batting tunnels, pitching mounds, hitting tunnels, masters pitching machines, and ten bullpens. All fields are equipped for night play.

==== Softball Diamondplex ====
The first venue to be completed at the facility, it consists of six fields used for softball and youth baseball. Organized with four fields in circle and two adjacent.

==== Tennis Complex ====
A 1,000 to 8,500 seat tennis complex with 10-clay courts with center court stadium and was one of the original nine venues.

==== Track and Field Complex ====
A 500-seat competition facility for track and field events, designed to International Association of Athletics Federations specifications. This venue was one of the original nine venues.

- nine lane track
- three shot put rings
- two discus/hammer rings
- a javelin runway
- two high jump areas
- two horizontal jump runways
- two pole vault runways
- 0.7-mile (1.1 km) wooded cross-country course

== Programs and events ==
Disney created a third of its events while bidding for other tournaments or attracting long term partners such as the Amateur Athletic Union. As of 2006, the union hosted at the complex 30 to 35 tournaments a year. The United States Specialty Sports Association had reserved six weekends at the complex. Disney also hosted more than 180 events involving more than 30 sports at the complex since 2006. In recent years, the complex has been utilized in wide ranges from many youth and collegiate sports activities to even providing alternative measures for some professional sports leagues to complete their seasons in some safer environments. Some of these following programs and events have taken place in various areas at the complex over the years.

- Disney Spring Training (1997–present) takes place from mid-February to mid-April in which high school and college teams practice during their spring break at the facility. Until 2005, the program accommodated teams primarily in track and field, lacrosse, and softball.
- Pop Warner Super Bowl (1997–present) takes place in December where the top teams in the nation and internationally of youth football have the Pop Warner championships held in the complex. Thousands of players and families come to the event, with ESPN even broadcasting part of these games live on national television.
- Disney Soccer Showcase (2000–present) a top youth soccer tournament
- Sunshine Showdown, a women's baseball tournament not to be confused with the Florida–Florida State college rivalry
- The resumption of the 2019–20 NBA season (July 30 – October 11, 2020): Due to the COVID-19 pandemic, the National Basketball Association's 2019–20 season was suspended in March 2020. On June 4, after competing with Las Vegas for hosting rights, the NBA approved a plan to restart the season on July 30 in the NBA Bubble with all games to be played at the AdventHealth Arena (previously named The Arena), the HP Field House, and the Visa Athletic Center with 22 of the league's 30 teams being invited – the 16 clubs that were in playoff position at the time and the six teams (five in the Western Conference, one in the Eastern Conference) within six games of one (primarily a Seed 8 spot). Under this plan, the 22 teams played eight regular-season "seeding" games. A possible play-in tournament for the eighth seed in each conference would then be held if the ninth seed finished the regular season within four games of the eighth seed, which did happen in the Western Conference between the Portland Trail Blazers and the Memphis Grizzlies, ending with Portland overtaking Memphis' initial playoff spot after one game played under it. The NBA Playoffs and Finals were then set to proceed as normal inside the bubble, and the season was successfully completed after the Los Angeles Lakers were victorious over the Miami Heat in six games. Prior to the season officially resuming, the teams also played scrimmages at the venues with 10-minute quarters from July 22 to 28. During the resumption of the season, as part of the bubble format to combat the spread of the virus, the teams were based on the Walt Disney World resort grounds at Disney's Yacht Club Resort, Disney's Grand Floridian Resort and Spa, and the Gran Destino Tower at Disney's Coronado Springs Resort based on seeding, with the teams with the worst records staying at Disney's Yacht Club Resort and those with the best records (including the Lakers and Heat) staying at Disney's Coronado Springs Resort. No players staying at the bubble during that time were infected with COVID-19, though a select few NBA players did violate their quarantine rules at the time and games were briefly paused after the shooting of Jacob Blake came to light.
- The MLS is Back Tournament (July 8 – August 11, 2020): Major League Soccer's 2020 season was also suspended due to the COVID-19 pandemic, though its season had just begun with each team first playing in only two games in late February and early March. On June 4, 2020, MLS and the MLS Players Association came to an agreement that included a tournament at the sports complex during the summer of 2020 to help restart their season. The tournament started in the group stage on July 8, entered the knockout stage on July 25 and ended in the final on August 11 with the Portland Timbers beating host Orlando City 2–1. They then officially continued the rest of their 2020 Major League Soccer season, including the 2020 Cup Playoffs, soon afterward.
- The entire, truncated 2020–21 NBA G League season (February 10 – March 11, 2021): With the 2019–20 NBA G League season cancelled due to the continuing COVID-19 pandemic combined with the National Basketball Association having their next season be played from December 2020 to July 2021, the NBA G League decided they had to do their season under a more truncated format, similar to the 2020 NBA Bubble. While initial plans had the G League's Bubble setting take place in Atlanta, the G League decided to host their entire season on the same grounds the NBA played in during their previous season. To help cover for expenses this season, each participating G League team's parent team had to contribute around $400,000–$500,000 in order for them to stay at the nearby resorts, as well as provide daily medical care, food, and COVID-19 tests. For this season, only 17 of the G League's 28 teams at the time, as well as the newly implemented NBA G League Ignite farm team, were able to compete in a regular season that lasted only 15 games long from February 10 to March 6 before entering a single elimination playoff format lasting from March 8–11. All games aired during that period of time were broadcast onto either ESPN2, ESPNU, or ESPN+. The season ended with the host #6 seed Lakeland Magic upsetting the #4 seed Delaware Blue Coats 97–78 in the championship match.
- On November 2, 2026, WWE announced that the John Cena Classic, a special episode of Monday Night Raw, would take place at the complex on December 14, 2026. One day later, WWE announced that a special Avengers: Doomsday-themed Worlds Collide event co-promoted by Lucha Libre AAA Worldwide (AAA) would take place at the complex on December 15, 2026.

== Prior tenants ==
- Orlando City Soccer Club (2014)

Events and tenants
Preceded by Citrus Bowl	Home of Orlando City Soccer Club; 2014	Succeeded by Citrus Bowl
