= Invictus Games =

International multi-parasport event

- Motto: I AM
- Inaugurated: 2014
- Governance body: Founding patron: Prince Harry, Duke of Sussex; Chairman: Lord Allen of Kensington; Chief Executive: Rob Owen; Deputy Chief Executive: Richard Smith; Trustees: Karen Briggs; Conny Wenting; Jonathan Edwards; Nick Loughran; Glenn Keys; David Richmond; Joanna Roper
- Headquarters: 24 Old Bond Street; London, England W1S 4AP
- Website: Official website

The Invictus Games is an international multi-sport event first held in 2014, for wounded, injured and sick military service personnel, both serving and veterans. The word invictus is Latin for 'unconquered', chosen as an embodiment of the fighting spirit of the wounded, injured and sick service personnel and what they can achieve, post-injury.

The Invictus Games were founded by Prince Harry, when he was joint patron of The Royal Foundation of The Duke and Duchess of Cambridge and Prince Harry, along with Sir Keith Mills, and in partnership with the Ministry of Defence. Inspiration for the Invictus Games came from Prince Harry's 2013 visit to the Warrior Games in the United States, where he witnessed the ability of sport to help both psychologically and physically.

== Launch ==
The Games were launched on 6 March 2014 by Prince Harry at London's Copper Box arena, used as a venue during the 2012 Olympics. Having seen a British team competing at the US Warrior Games held in Colorado in 2013, Harry wanted to bring the concept of a similar international sporting event to the United Kingdom. With the backing of Mayor of London Boris Johnson, the London Organising Committee of the Olympic and Paralympic Games and the Ministry of Defence, the event was put together over ten months. £500,000 of funding for the project came from the Endeavour Fund, an arm of the Royal Foundation Prince Harry had created specifically for veterans' recovery, with an equal amount being pledged by Chancellor George Osborne from Treasury funds generated by fines imposed on banks as a result of the Libor scandal. The Games were also sponsored by Jaguar Land Rover. Speaking at the launch, Prince Harry said that the Games would "demonstrate the power of sport to inspire recovery, support rehabilitation and demonstrate life beyond disability". He also said that their long-term objective was to ensure that injured troops are not forgotten as Britain's involvement with the War in Afghanistan comes to an end. Boeing was announced as a sponsor in 2018 and became a presenting partner in 2023 before ending the partnership in 2026.

== Host cities ==
Edition	Year	City	Country	Venue	Nations	Opening ceremony	Closing ceremony
1	2014	London	United Kingdom	Queen Elizabeth Olympic Park	14	10 September 2014	14 September 2014
2	2016	Orlando	United States	ESPN Wide World of Sports	15	8 May 2016	12 May 2016
3	2017	Toronto	Canada	Air Canada Centre	17	23 September 2017	30 September 2017
4	2018	Sydney	Australia	Sydney Olympic Park	18	20 October 2018	27 October 2018
5	2020 (Note: The 2020 Invictus Games were held in 2022, after initially being postponed to 2021, but later being postponed to 2022, due to the COVID-19 pandemic.)	The Hague	Netherlands	Sportcampus Zuiderpark	17	16 April 2022	22 April 2022
6	2023	Düsseldorf	Germany	Merkur Spiel-Arena	21	9 September 2023	16 September 2023
7	2025	Vancouver-Whistler	Canada	Vancouver Convention Centre	23	8 February 2025	16 February 2025
8	2027	Birmingham	United Kingdom	National Exhibition Centre	26	10 July 2027	17 July 2027
9	2029	Daejeon	South Korea			6 October 2029	15 October 2029

== Invictus Games Foundation ==
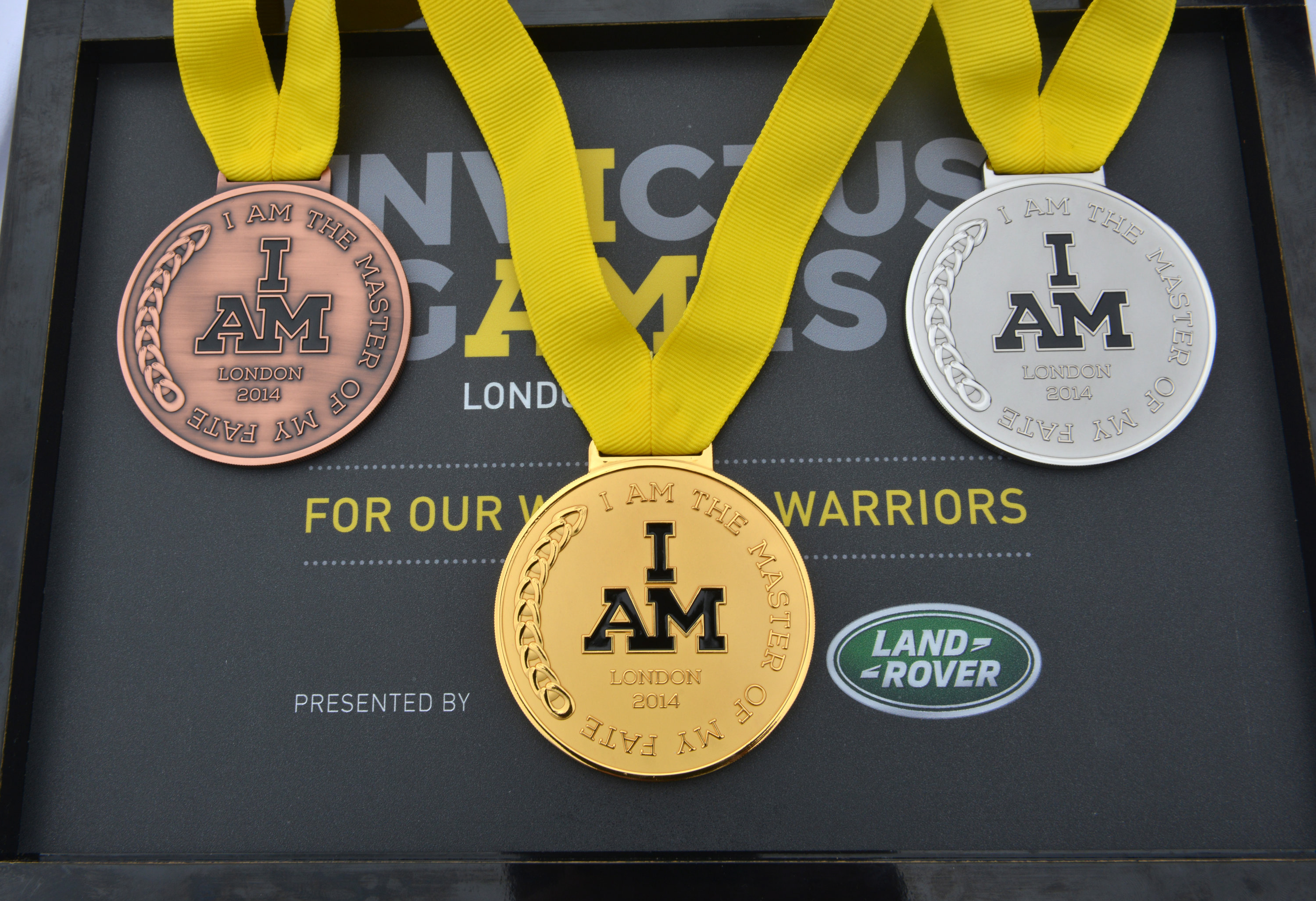
Medals from London 2014

The Invictus Games Foundation is the owner of the brand and the selector of future Host Cities. It is responsible for sport and competition management, rules, categorisations and branding.

The bidding process for future Games started in November 2014.

=== Governance ===
The people who govern the foundation are:

- Patron: Prince Harry
- Chairman: Charles Allen, Baron Allen of Kensington

Trustees

- Melanie Richards
- Paddy Nicoll
- Karen Briggs
- JJ Chalmers
- Conny Wenting
- Jonathan Edwards
- Edward Lane Fox
- Nick Loughran

Staff

- Chief Executive Officer: Dominic Reid (2014–25) · Rob Owen (2025–)
- Deputy Chief Executive Officer: Richard Smith
- Chief Development Officer: Helen D'Oyley
- Communications Director: Sam Newell
- Grants and Programme Director: Mickaela Richards
- Finance Director: Ruth Paul
- International Development Director: David Wiseman
- Head of Partnerships: Nick Smith
- Digital Communications Manager: Paul Saunders
- Endeavours Programme Manager: Fiona Cranswick
- Operations Manager: Caroline Davis
- Invictus Community Liaison Executive: Josh Boggi
- Invictus Endeavours Administrator: Angelo Anderson
- Grants and Operations Support Executive: Maria Ribeiro

=== Ambassador ===
Lewis Hamilton, a seven-time Formula One World Champion, was appointed the first ambassador; he visited Tedworth House before the announcement. In July 2015, Lewis invited some Invictus Games athletes to the British Grand Prix.

=== Finances ===
In 2024, the foundation reduced the amount of direct funding provided to veteran groups by 63 percent, lowering grants from £534,973 to £200,328. During that same period, the organisation's income increased by 41 percent, it introduced a new executive position with a six-figure salary, and its cash reserves climbed to £2.3 million. Its top-earning employee received compensation estimated between £120,000 and £130,000, exceeding the usual pay range within the UK nonprofit sector. Meanwhile, legal expenses rose sharply from £45,000 to £150,000, and deferred income expanded significantly, increasing from £431,950 to £1.79 million.

== History ==
=== 2014 Invictus Games ===
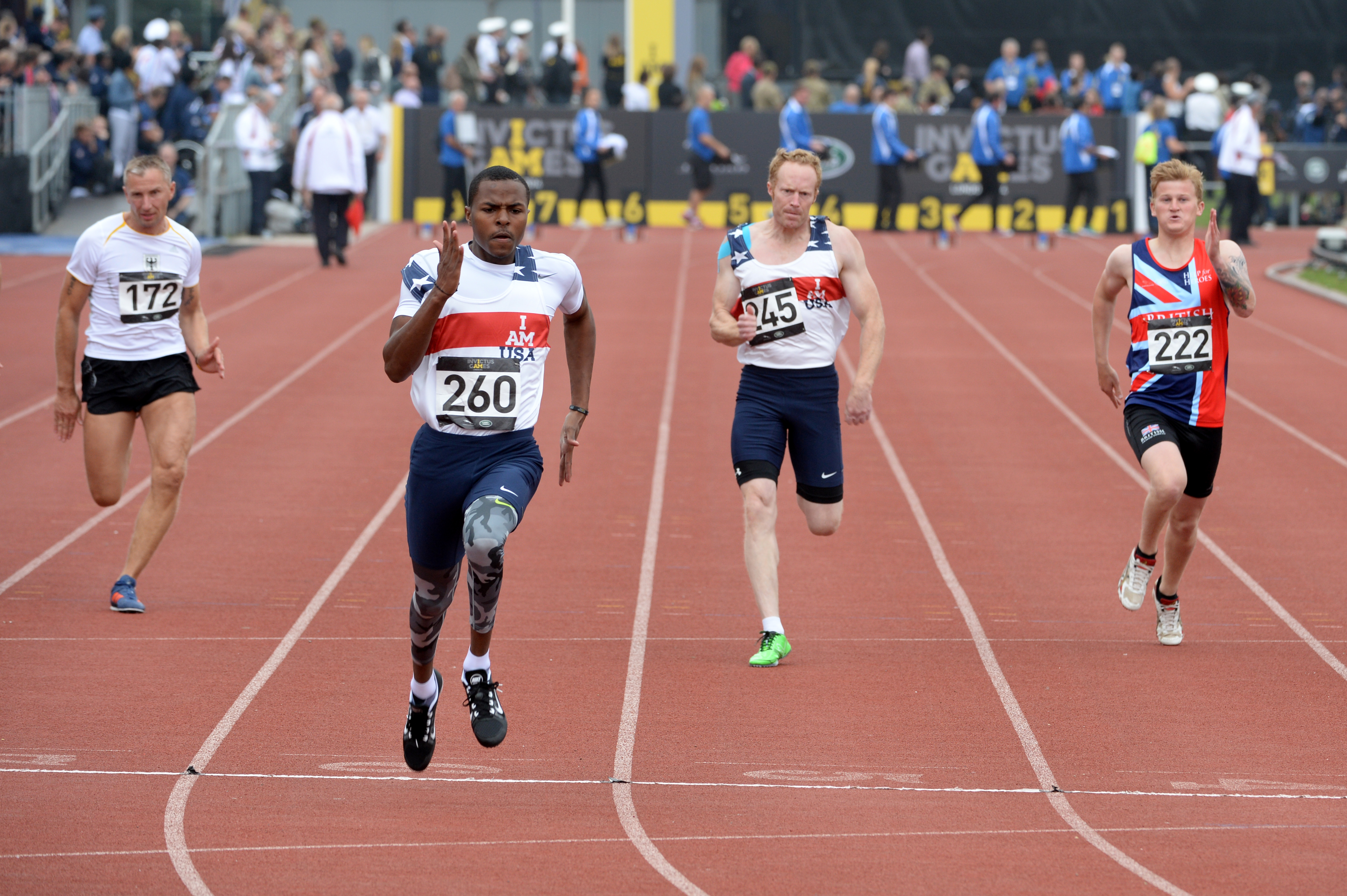
Four runners from Germany, the United Kingdom and the United States during a 100-metre qualifying heat at the 2014 Invictus Games

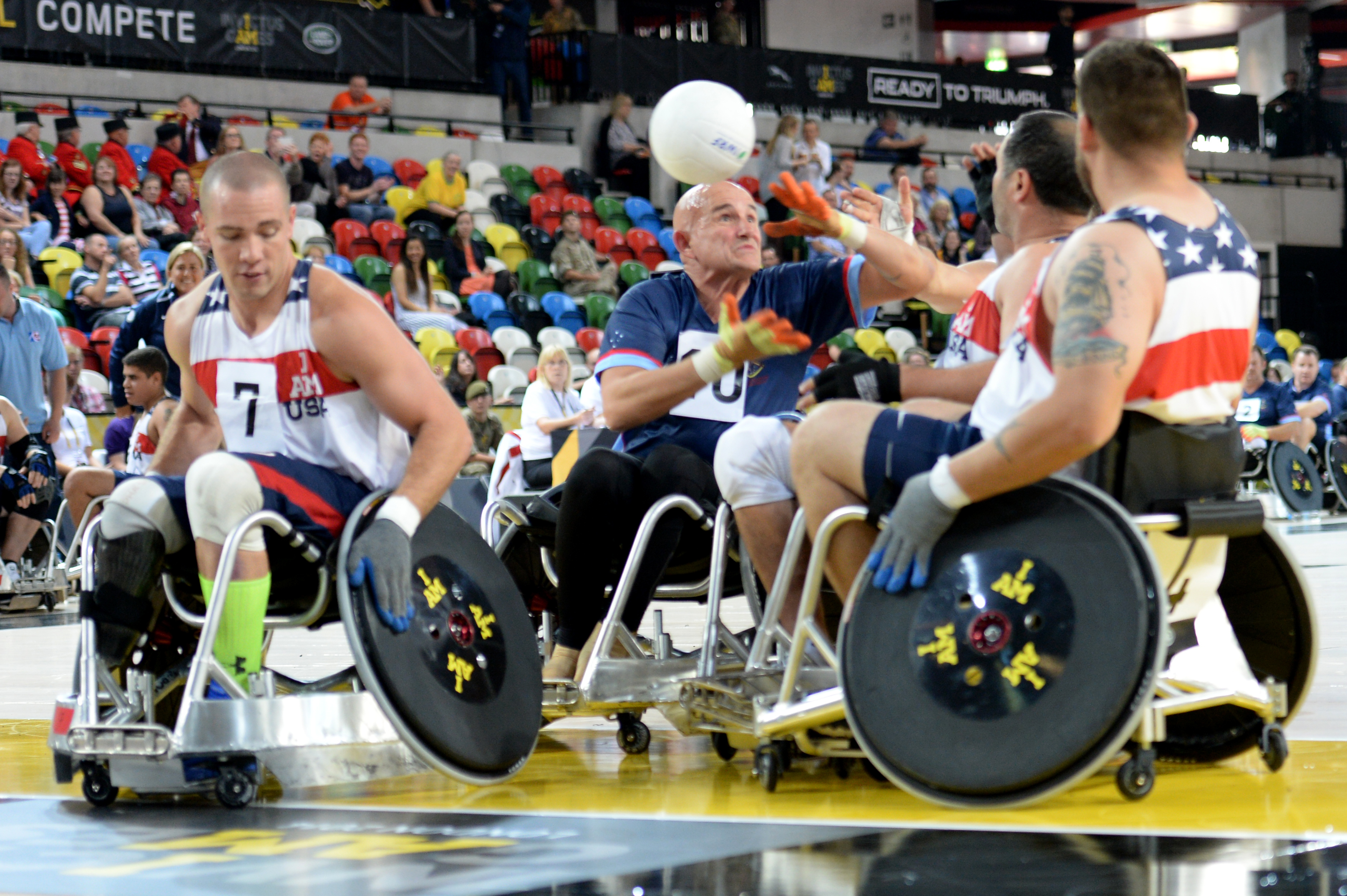
Three American defenders knock the ball away from an Australian player during a wheelchair rugby pool match between the United States and Australia at the 2014 Invictus Games

The first Invictus Games were held in London on 10–14 September 2014. Around 300 competitors from 13 countries which have fought alongside the United Kingdom in recent military campaigns participated. Competitive events were held at many of the venues used during the 2012 Olympics, including the Copper Box and the Lee Valley Athletics Centre. The Games were broadcast by the BBC.

14 countries were invited to the 2014 Games, 8 from Europe, 2 from Asia, 2 from North America and 2 from Oceania. No countries from Africa were invited. Teams from all the invited countries, except Iraq, took part.

The closing concert was broadcast on BBC Two, hosted by Clare Balding and Greg James. The concert was hosted by Nick Grimshaw and Fearne Cotton, with live performances from Foo Fighters, Kaiser Chiefs, James Blunt, Rizzle Kicks, Bryan Adams and Ellie Goulding.

=== 2016 Invictus Games ===
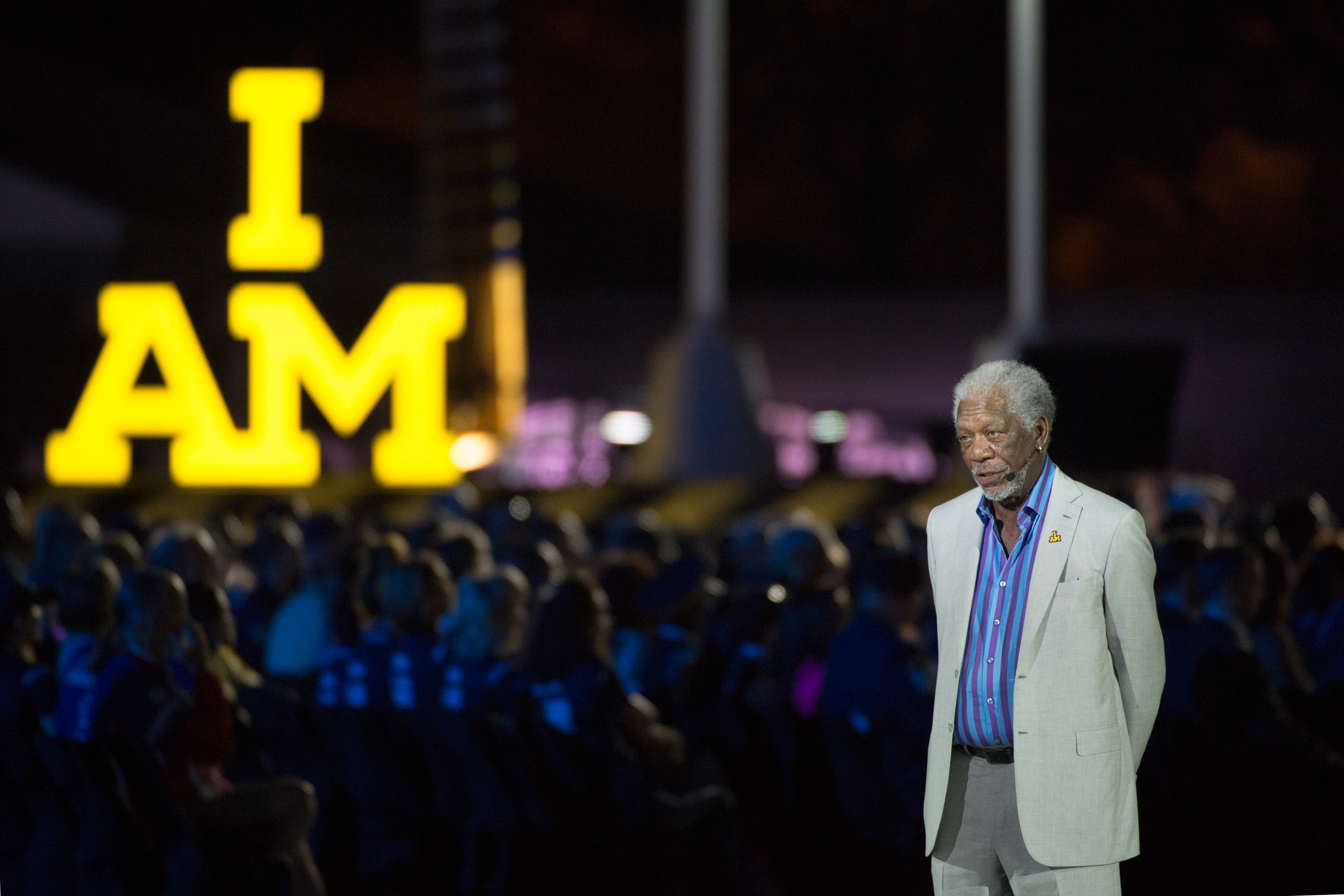
Academy Award-winning actor Morgan Freeman narrates for the opening ceremony to the 2016 Invictus games in Orlando, Florida

On 14 July 2015, Prince Harry announced the 2016 Invictus Games would take place from 8–12 May 2016 at the ESPN Wide World of Sports Complex in Orlando, Florida.

On 28 October 2015, Prince Harry, USA's First Lady Michelle Obama and Second Lady Jill Biden launched Invictus Games 2016 at Fort Belvoir.

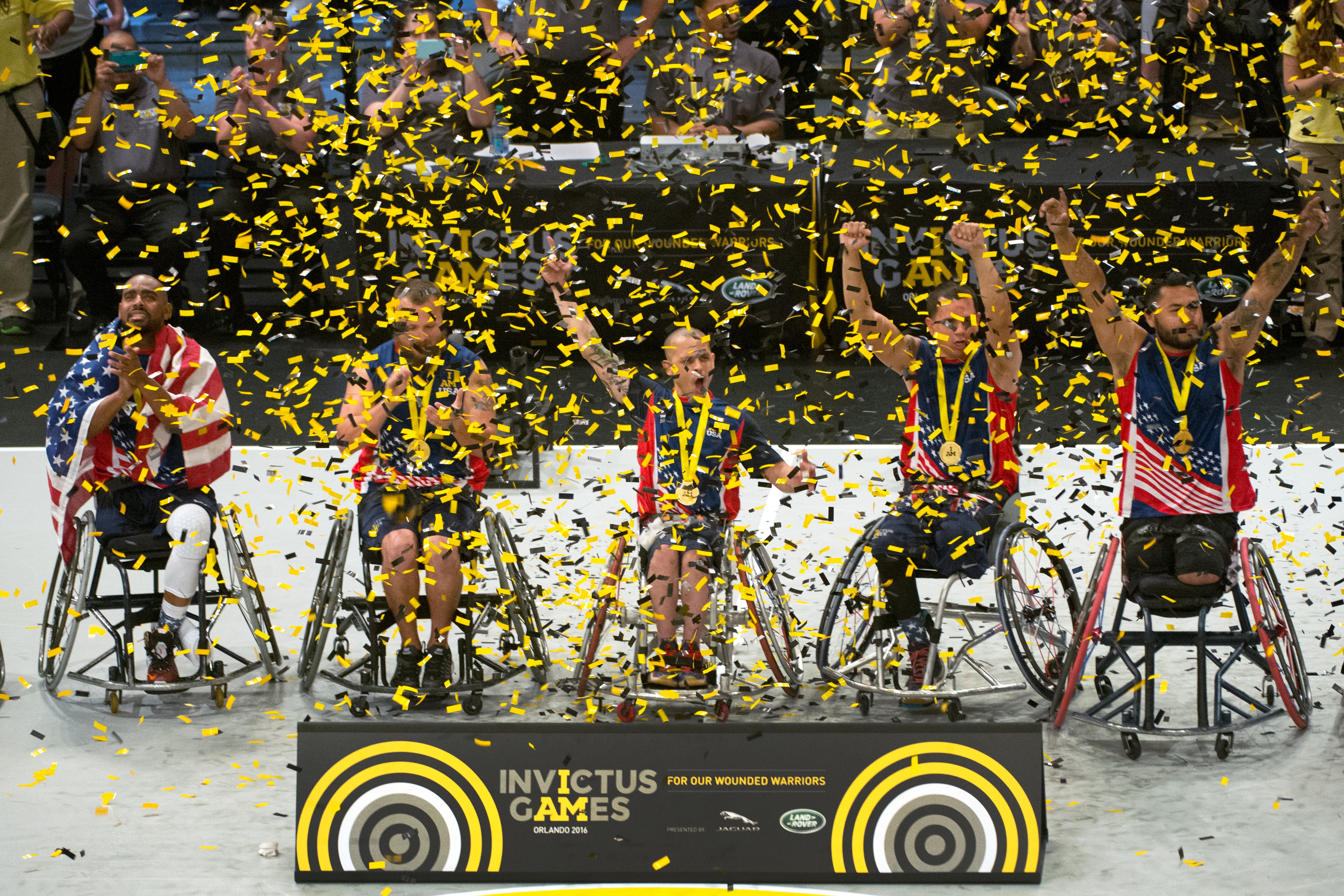
U.S. Invictus wheelchair basketball team members celebrate their gold medal win at the 2016 Invictus Games

In order to bring Invictus Games to the US, Military Adaptive Sports Inc. (MASI) was created, and worked to build on the success of the Invictus Games 2014 held in London. Ken Fisher was chairman and CEO for Invictus Games Orlando 2016.

All 14 countries from the 2014 Games were invited back, while Jordan was the only new invitee.

=== 2017 Invictus Games ===
Toronto hosted the 2017 Invictus Games in September 2017 during Canada's sesquicentennial. Building from hosting the Pan American and Parapan American Games in 2015, Toronto's organizers planned to feature more competitors, nations and sports—such as ice events—than previously.

Unlike prior Games which were hosted at a single site, multiple venues around the Greater Toronto Area hosted the 12 sporting events and opening and closing ceremonies. The Air Canada Centre hosted the ceremonies. Fort York National Historic Site hosted the archery; Nathan Phillips Square hosted wheelchair tennis; Ryerson University's Mattamy Athletic Centre hosted the indoor rowing, powerlifting, sitting volleyball, wheelchair basketball and wheelchair rugby; St. George's Golf and Country Club hosted the golf; The Distillery District hosted the Jaguar Land Rover driving challenge; High Park hosted cycling; Toronto Pan Am Sports Centre hosted swimming, sitting volleyball and wheelchair basketball; and York Lions Stadium hosted the athletics.

Michael Burns was the CEO for the 2017 Games, and the official mascot for the Games was Vimy, a Labrador.

All 15 countries from the 2016 Games were invited back, with new invitations going to Romania and Ukraine.

=== 2018 Invictus Games ===
Bids to host the 2018 Invictus Games closed in December 2015. The Gold Coast in Australia announced its intention to bid, using facilities built for the 2018 Commonwealth Games. In November 2016, Sydney, Australia, was announced as the host city.

Patrick Kidd was the CEO. The Royal Australian Mint released a commemorative $1 coin featuring Braille text in the lead-up to the Games.

All 17 countries from the 2017 Games were invited back, with an invitation extended to Poland.

Off the back of the Invictus Games in Sydney, legacy organisation Invictus Australia was set up to continue to support veterans and their families through sport within Australia beyond the games period. It had partnerships with the Australian Sports Commission and Volunteering Australia. In May 2026, the government of Australia stated that it would discontinue its $9 million funding pledge to Invictus Australia in the 2026 budget, a decision that was eventually reversed later in the same month.

=== 2020 Invictus Games ===
The games were to be held on 9–16 May 2020 at the Zuiderpark Stadion in The Hague, Netherlands, but were postponed to 2021 due to the COVID-19 pandemic. They were then postponed again to the spring of 2022. The new dates were 16 April to 22 April 2022.

In April 2021, it was announced that Heart of Invictus, a Netflix documentary series in partnership with Invictus Games and Archewell, would surround the competitors from the 2022 Invictus Games. Prince Harry would executive produce the series and appear on camera. The funding from the documentary series would go to the Invictus Games Foundation, and their work supporting international wounded, injured and sick service personnel and veterans.

=== 2023 Invictus Games ===
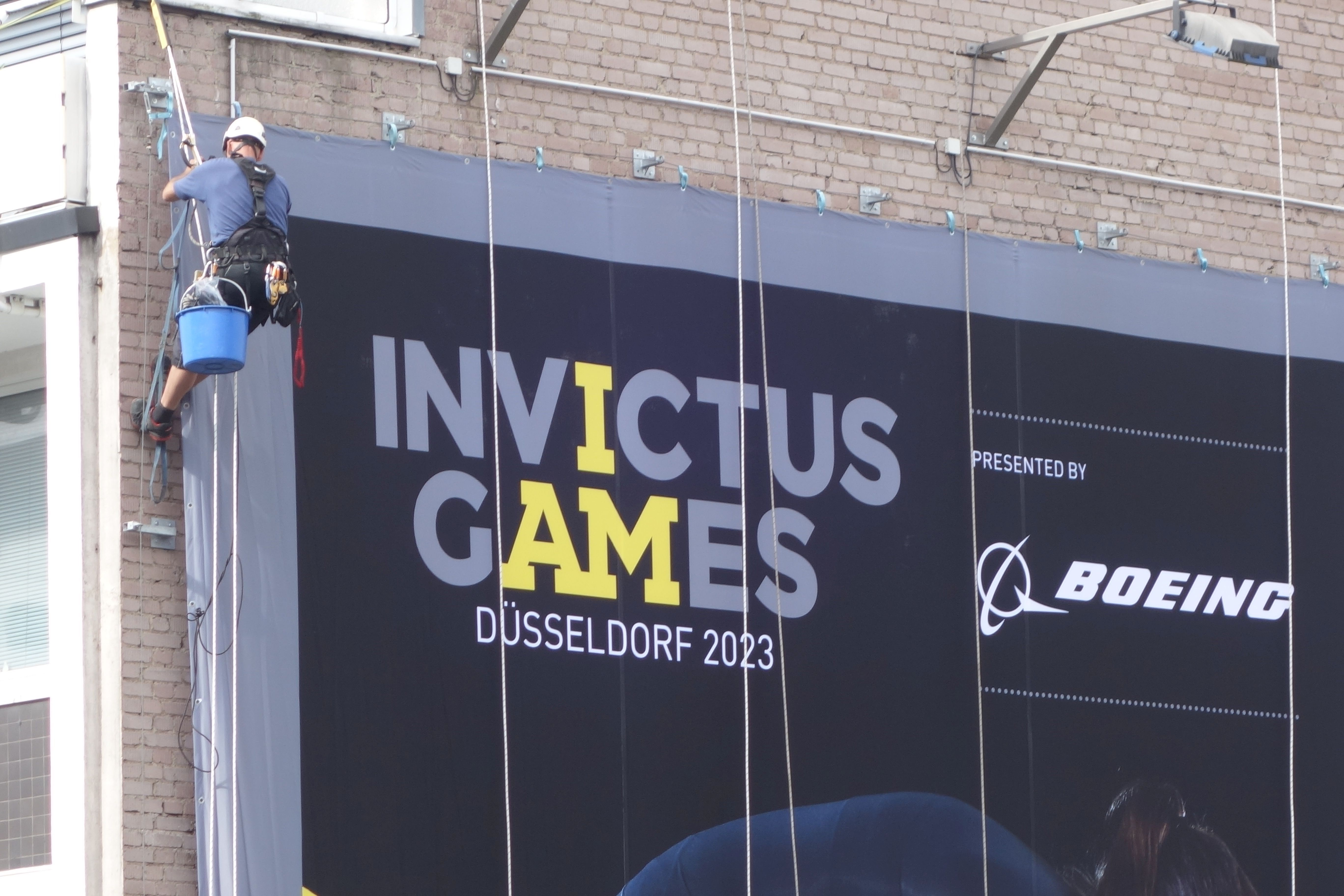
An industrial climber installs a large poster for the Invictus Games 2023 in Düsseldorf

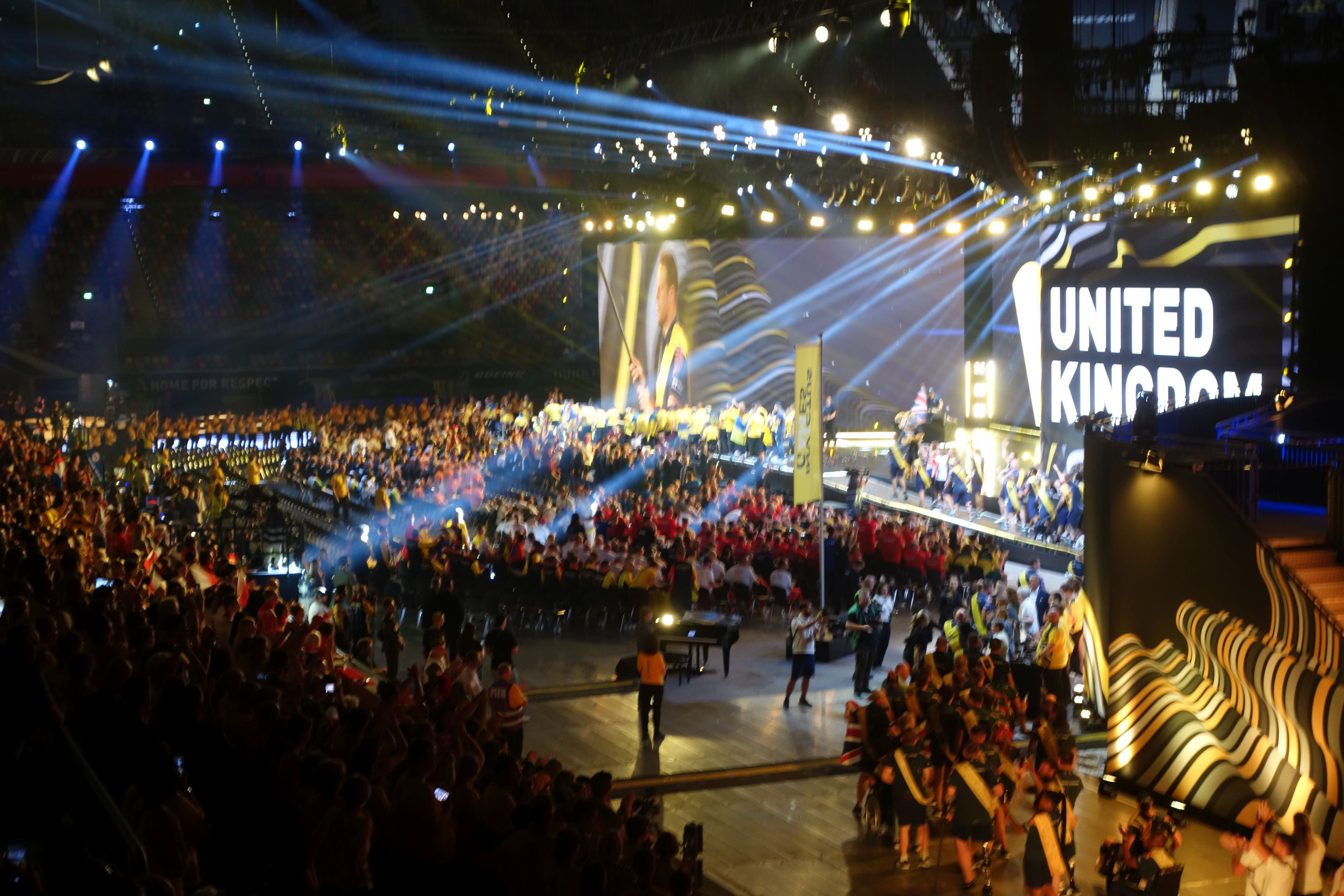
Closing event of the Invictus Games in Düsseldorf 2023, entry United Kingdom

The Games were to be held in 2022 in Düsseldorf, Germany, in the Merkur Spiel-Arena. Following the postponement of the 2020 Games to 2022, the Düsseldorf Games were postponed to 2023.

Retired Canadian Armed Forces veteran Scott Snow, a member of Team Canada at the 2023 Invictus Games in Düsseldorf, filed a $2.4 million lawsuit in 2025 against Canada's Department of National Defence and the Canadian Armed Forces after suffering serious injuries in a wheelchair rugby match, alleging that veteran competitors lacked sports-injury insurance coverage. Following publicity surrounding his case, the Canadian government acknowledged the insurance gap and introduced coverage for veterans at future Invictus Games, though the policy was not applied retroactively. In a later interview, Snow criticised the response of the Invictus Games organisation and its founder, Prince Harry, stating that his attempts to contact Invictus leadership and Harry's office after the injury went unanswered.

=== 2025 Invictus Games ===
On 22 April 2022, the Duke of Sussex announced that the 2025 Games will take place in Vancouver and Whistler, Canada. It is the first edition of Invictus Games to feature winter adaptive sports, including alpine skiing, Nordic skiing, skeleton and wheelchair curling. The bid to host the Games was submitted by True Patriot Love Foundation, in partnership with the Government of Canada, the province of British Columbia and the two Canadian municipalities and in partnership with the local Lil'wat, Musqueam, Squamish, and Tsleil-Waututh indigenous nations.

=== 2027 Invictus Games ===
In July 2024, it was announced that Birmingham will be hosting the 2027 Invictus Games, which will be held at the National Exhibition Centre.

For the first time pickleball is expected to be included in the Invictus Games. Carlisle-based Gaz Golightly, a military veteran and amputee, lobbied for inclusion of the sport after trying various wheelchair sports and deciding pickleball was by far the most inclusive for wheelchair users.

In July 2026, Uganda became the second African nation to join the games, but after a letter released by the Lord Chamberlain in September 2026 clarified that Prince Harry and his wife Meghan remained non-working royals who did not represent the Crown, the Ugandan Chief of Defence Forces, Muhoozi Kainerugaba, stated that his country would "not participate in anything" that did not have King Charles III's "approval". Later in September it was announced that Uganda would take part in the games, after a telephone conversation between Kainerugaba and the principal private secretary to the King, Sir Clive Alderton, during which Kainerugaba was reassured of the King's approval.

The INSPIRE education programme was launched in September 2026 by Invictus Games Birmingham 2027 as a free, curriculum-aligned initiative available to UK schools nationwide, using the values and stories of Invictus competitors to engage students.

=== 2029 Invictus Games ===
On 17 June 2025, the Invictus Games Foundation announced that six expressions of interest were submitted for the 2029 Games;

- Aalborg, Denmark
- Abuja, Nigeria
- Daejeon, South Korea
- Kyiv, Ukraine
- San Diego, United States
- Veneto, Italy

On 20 July 2026, Daejeon was officially announced as the host city for the 2029 Games, the first time the event will be held in Asia.

== Invictus Spirit Awards ==
The Invictus Spirit Awards are an awards and fundraising event connected to the Invictus Games Foundation. They are a reworking of the former Endeavour Awards that ran from 2017–2020 under the Royal Foundation. They were founded to recognise individuals and organisations making significant contributions to the Invictus community and raise money for the foundation's year-round recovery and adaptive-sport programmes. The inaugural Invictus Spirit Gala Dinner & Awards, presented by ATCO, was held at the Old Royal Naval College in Greenwich on 17 September 2026. The event raised £1.6 million. James Corden opened the event, which had performances by Jess Glynne and DJ Sonique. The nominees were recognised across six categories, including the Resilience Award, Invictus Champion Award, Invictus Community Award, Invictus Movement Award, Invictus Legacy Award, and Henry Worsley Award for an individual embodying the Invictus ethos across categories.

== See also ==
- Help for Heroes
- IWAS World Games
- Military sports
- Military World Games
- Paralympic Games
