= 2016 Invictus Games =

Multi-sport event held in Orlando, Florida, U.S.

Invictus Games – Orlando 2016
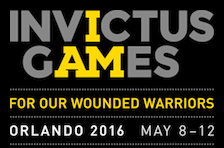
- Host city: Orlando, Florida, United States
- Nations: 15
- Debuting countries: 2
- Opening: 8 May 2016
- Closing: 12 May 2016
- Opened by: Prince Harry
- Website: invictusgames2016.info

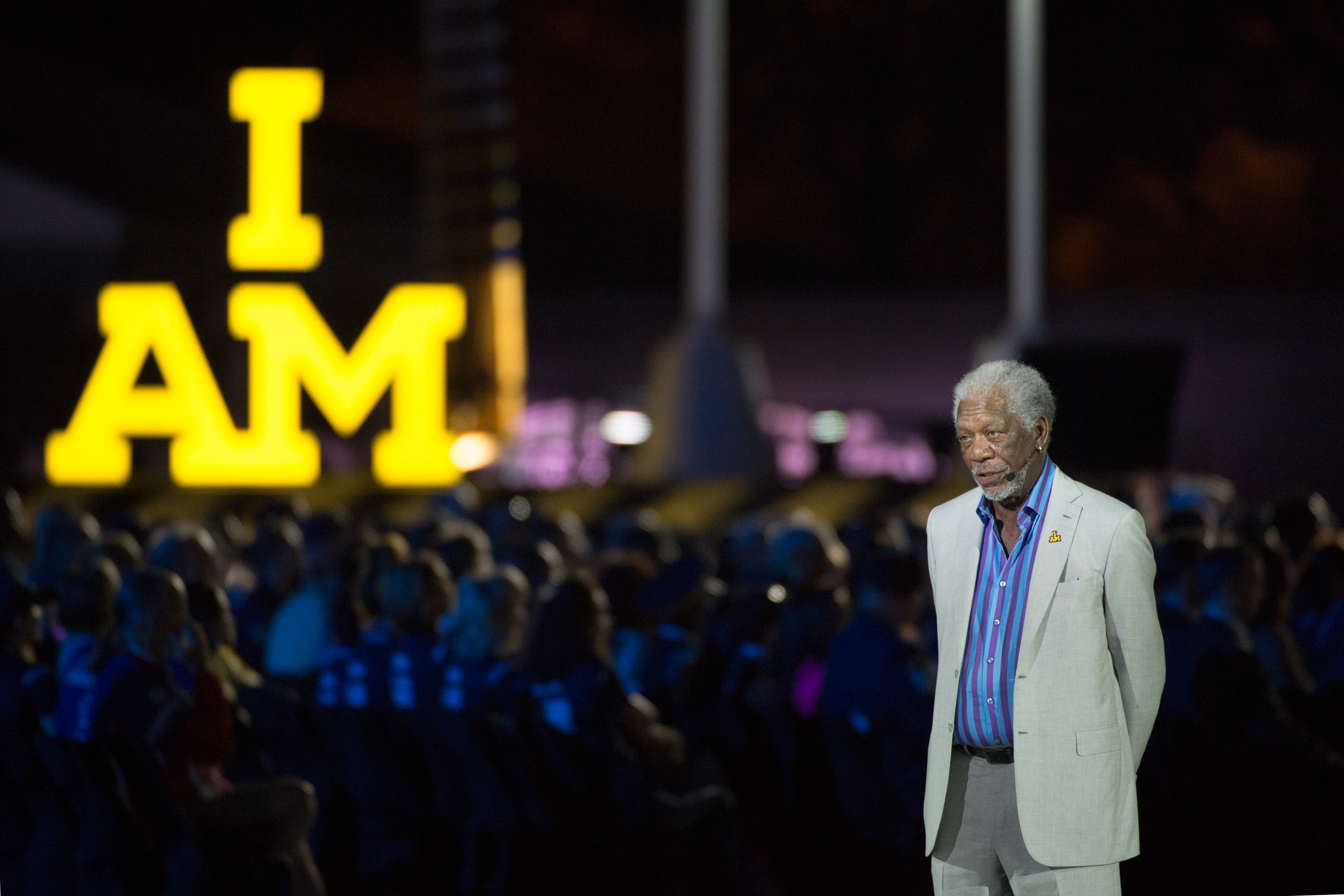
Actor Morgan Freeman at the opening ceremony

The 2016 Invictus Games were the second edition of the Invictus Games. On 14 July 2015, Prince Harry, founder and patron of Invictus Games Foundation, announced the 2016 Invictus Games would take place from 8–12 May 2016 at the ESPN Wide World of Sports Complex in Orlando, Florida.

On 28 October 2015, Prince Harry and the First Lady of the United States Michelle Obama and Second Lady Jill Biden, launched Invictus Games 2016 at Fort Belvoir.

== Organising committee ==
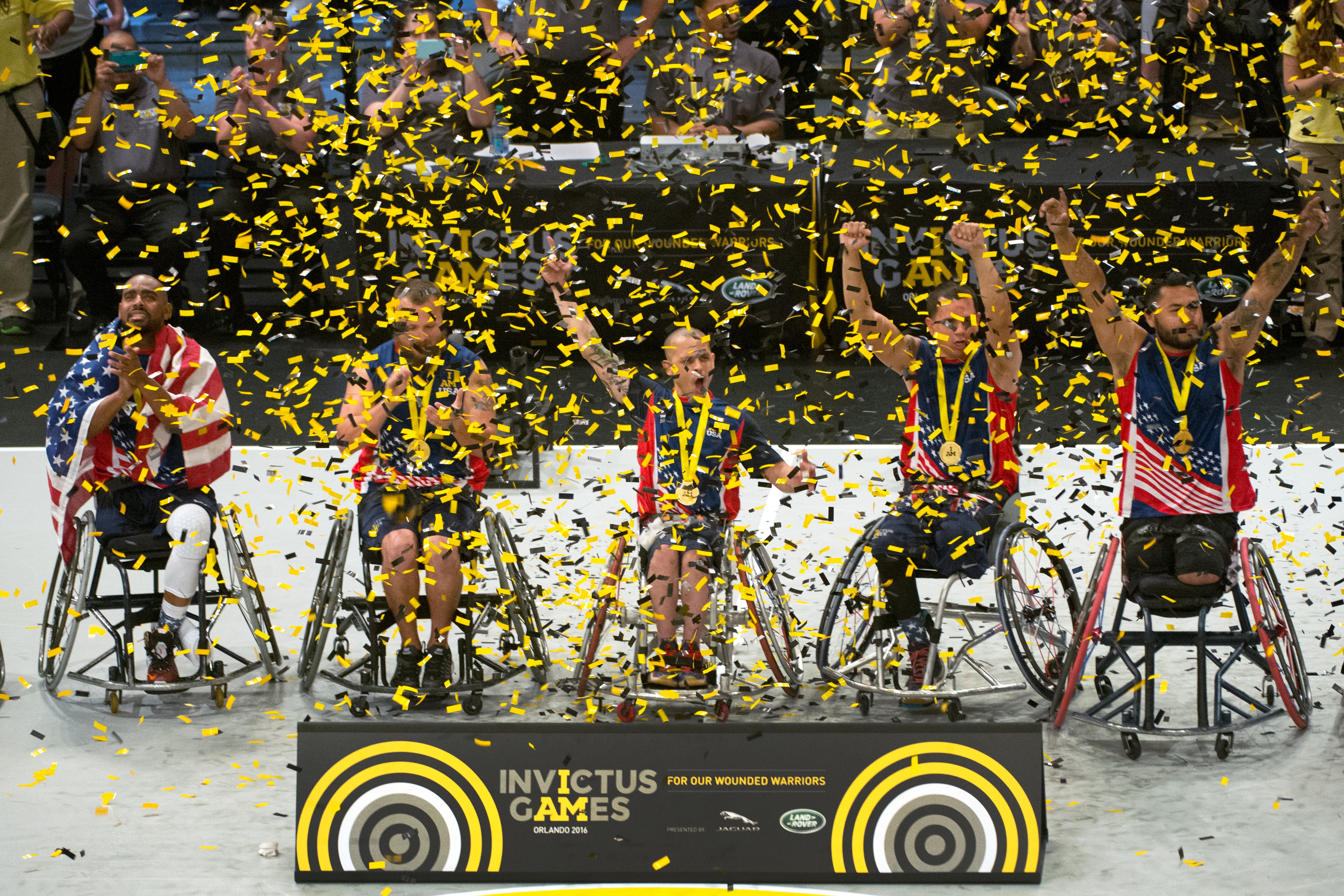
U.S. Invictus wheelchair basketball team members celebrate their gold medal win during the 2016 Invictus Games

In order to bring Invictus Games to the USA, Military Adaptive Sports Inc. (MASI) was created, and worked to build on the success of the Invictus Games 2014 held in London.

Board Members of Military Adaptive Sports Inc.

- Chairman: Ken Fisher (Chairman and CEO of the Fisher House Foundation)
- Gerry Byrne, PMC’s vice chairman, also on the board of many NPO, including Fisher House, The Bob Woodruff Foundation, and Veterans Advantage.
- Paul W. Bucha, Vietnam War veteran.
- Martin L. Edelman, "of counsel" to Paul Hastings LLP,
- Bronwen Evans, Founding Director and CEO of True Patriot Love Foundation (TPL) of Canada, which has been raising record funds to support military families through its signature Tribute Dinners since its inception in 2009.
- David Fox, retired senior partner of Greenwich Associates
- Michael Haynie, vice chancellor of Syracuse University, responsible for Veteran and Military Affairs.
- Charlie Huebner, vice president of Paralympic development for the U.S. Olympic and Paralympic Foundation (USOPF).
- Raymond W. Kelly
- Donna E. Shalala, President and CEO of the Clinton Foundation.
- Christie Smith, PhD, Deloitte Managing Principal for Consulting in the west region of the United States.
- Jacqueline A. Weiss, General Counsel of Fisher Brothers, responsible for legal affairs.
- Montel Williams

Ken Fisher was chairman and CEO for Invictus Games Orlando 2016.

== Invited countries ==
All 14 countries from the 2014 Games were invited back, while Jordan was the only new invitee.

- Afghanistan
- Australia
- Canada
- Denmark
- Estonia
- France
- Georgia
- Germany
- Iraq
- Italy
- Jordan
- Netherlands
- New Zealand
- United Kingdom
- United States

== Sporting events ==
- Archery
- Driving competition
- Indoor rowing
- Paralympic athletics (aka track & field)
- Paralympic swimming
- Paratriathlon
- Powerlifting
- Road cycling/Road para-cycling
- Sitting volleyball
- Wheelchair basketball
- Wheelchair rugby
- Wheelchair tennis
