= 2020 Invictus Games =

Multi-sport event in The Hague, Netherlands

Invictus Games – The Hague 2020
- Host city: The Hague, Netherlands
- Nations: 17
- Debuting countries: 2
- Athletes: ~500
- Opening: 16 April 2022
- Closing: 22 April 2022
- Opened by: Prince Harry, Duke of Sussex
- Main venue: Sportcampus Zuiderpark
- Website: invictusgames2020.com

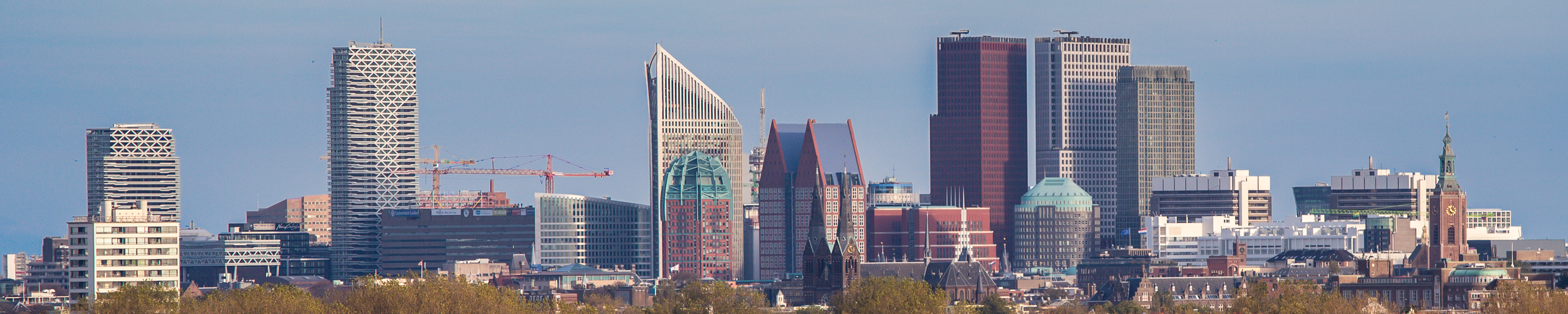
Hague skyline

The 2020 Invictus Games was an adaptive multi-sport event for wounded, injured and ill veteran and active defence personnel, that took place in The Hague, Netherlands in April 2022, after having been postponed twice. It was the fifth edition of the Invictus Games.

== Development and preparation ==
The games were to be held on 9–16 May 2020 at the Zuiderpark, but were postponed to 2021 due to the COVID-19 pandemic. They were then postponed again to the spring of 2022. The opening ceremony on 16 April 2022 was attended by the event's founding patron Prince Harry, Duke of Sussex, and his wife Meghan, Duchess of Sussex. Also in attendance were Princess Margriet of the Netherlands, who is the Honorary Chair of the committee of recommendation of the 2020 Invictus Games and who christened the official Invictus Games Tulip in June 2021, and her son Prince Pieter-Christiaan. Representatives of participating nations were also present. King Willem-Alexander of the Netherlands attended the closing ceremony on 22 April 2022.

The Royal Dutch Mint was announced as the sponsor and designer of the medals and other special sporty issues for the games.

== The Games ==
=== Participating countries ===
The 18 participating countries of the 2018 Invictus Games were invited back, along with new invitations to Belgium and South Korea.

Due to COVID measures, Jordan, Afghanistan and New Zealand could not attend. The 17 participating countries were:

- Australia
- Belgium
- Canada
- Denmark
- Estonia
- France
- Georgia
- Germany
- Iraq
- Italy
- Netherlands (host)
- Poland
- Romania
- South Korea
- Ukraine
- United Kingdom
- United States

Another team titled "Unconquered" also participated in certain events consisting of competitors from multiple nations.

=== Sports ===
There are 9 adaptive sports contested at the Games as well as the Land Rover Driving Challenge.

- Archery
- Athletics
- Indoor rowing
- Powerlifting
- Road cycling
- Sitting volleyball
- Swimming
- Wheelchair basketball
- Wheelchair rugby
- Land Rover Driving Challenge

== Medalists ==
=== Land Rover driving challenge ===
Event	Gold	Silver	Bronze
Team	France; Christophe Collot; Franck Poirot	Romania; Mihai Ion Toma; Iulian Constantin Capatina	Georgia; Murtazi Osepaishvili; Onise Jugeli

=== Archery ===
Event	Class	Gold	Silver	Bronze
Men's recurve	Novice	Stéphane Pretot; France	Stuart Padley; United Kingdom	Jean-François Lavergne; Canada
Men's recurve	Open	Kim Kang-hun; South Korea	Emil Florin Cojocaru; Romania	Andrzej Skrajny; Poland
Women's recurve	Novice	Sherry Louise McBain; United Kingdom	Rose-Marie Maya; France	Anna-Sofia Puzanova; Ukraine
Team recurve	Novice	Denmark; Uffe Christensen; Bubby Jacobsen; Jesper Smollerup	Poland; Krzysztof Gozdzik; Rafal Lis; Waldemar Skoneczny	Canada; Jean-François Lavergne; Christopher Moores; Wade Stach
Team recurve	Open	Romania; Iulian Constantin Capatina; Emil Florin Cojocaru; Eduard Vlad Romila	Ukraine; Dmytro Afanasiev; Serhii Kalytiuk; Vasyl Stuzhenko	United Kingdom; Anthony Booth; Chaze Melluish; Daniel O'Connor
Men's compound	Open	Marcel Neagu; Romania	Brett Campfield; United States	Douglas Godfrey, Jr. United States
Women's compound	Open	Tiffany Hudgins; United States	Michelle Sanchez; United States	Kristel van Dinter; Netherlands
Team compound	Open	United States; Brett Campfield; Richard Devericks; Douglas Godfrey, Jr.	Romania; Florin Bolovan; Marcel Neagu; Mihai Ion Toma	Italy; Massimo Addio; Giuseppe Erriquez; Andrea Preite

=== Athletics ===
Men

Event	Class	Gold	Silver	Bronze
100 m	IT1	Kionte Storey; United States	Aleksi Beruashvili; Georgia	Ross Alewine; United States
200 m	IT1	Aleksi Beruashvili; Georgia	Kionte Storey; United States	Wolf Wolput; Belgium
400 m	IT1	Carlo Calcagni; Italy	Sébastien Peyen; France	Ross Alewine; United States
1500 m	IT1	Aleksi Beruashvili; Georgia	Wolf Wolput; Belgium	Oleksii Bobchynets; Ukraine
100 m	IT2	Marco Pisani; Italy	not awarded	not awarded
100 m	IT3	David Malenfant; Canada	Mattia Dal Pastro; Italy	Seo Won-bae; South Korea
200 m	IT3	David Malenfant; Canada	not awarded	not awarded
400 m	IT3	David Malenfant; Canada	Garrett Powers; Canada	not awarded
1500 m	IT3	Mattia Dal Pastro; Italy	David Malenfant; Canada	Roberto Como; Italy
100 m	IT4	Patrick Levis; Canada	Garrett Kuwada; United States	Akhmed Safarov; Georgia
200 m	IT4	Patrick Levis; Canada	Garrett Kuwada; United States	Jai Cheon; United States
400 m	IT4	Patrick Levis; Canada	Jai Cheon; United States	Garrett Kuwada; United States
1500 m	IT4	Patrick Levis; Canada	Garrett Kuwada; United States	Jai Cheon; United States
100 m	IT5	Micheal Nicholson; United States	Joel Rodriguez; United States	not awarded
200 m	IT5	Micheal Nicholson; United States	Joel Rodriguez; United States	not awarded
400 m	IT5	Micheal Nicholson; United States	Joel Rodriguez; United States	not awarded
100 m	IT6	Jacob Cox; United States	Michael Murphy; United States	not awarded
200 m	IT6	Jacob Cox; United States	Michael Murphy; United States	not awarded
400 m	IT6	Jacob Cox; United States	Michael Murphy; United States	not awarded
1500 m	IT6	Michael Murphy; United States	Jacob Cox; United States	not awarded
100 m	IT7	Andrew Holliday; United States	Rafael Morfinenciso; United States	Matthew Cable; United States
200 m	IT7	Andrew Holliday; United States	Rafael Morfinenciso; United States	Matthew Cable; United States
400 m	IT7	Fred Lewis; United States	Rafael Morfinenciso; United States	Jacob Anthony; United States
1500 m	IT7	Gérald Monnier; France	Andrew Wilkinson; Australia	Rafal Rutkowski; Poland
100 m	IT8	Mark Clougherty; United Kingdom	Daniel Phillips; United Kingdom	Joshua Smith; United States
200 m	IT8	Mark Clougherty; United Kingdom	Joshua Smith; United States	Daniel Phillips; United Kingdom
400 m	IT8	Mark Clougherty; United Kingdom	Joshua Smith; United States	Daniel Phillips; United Kingdom
1500 m	IT8	Joshua Smith; United States	Daniel Phillips; United Kingdom	Mark Clougherty; United Kingdom
Long jump	IJ5	Rafael Morfinenciso; United States	Artem Lukashuk; Ukraine	Ivan Heretsun; Ukraine
Shot put	IF1	Ross Alewine; United States	Dandy Wilson; United States	Imad al-Shuwaili; Iraq
Discus throw	IF1	Alexander Ulrich; Germany	Nathan King; Australia	Frederik De Keyzer; Belgium
Shot put	IF2	Rodion Sitdikov; Ukraine	Yaseen Mahdi; Iraq	Garrett Powers; Canada
Discus throw	IF2	Rene Hinrikus; Estonia	Luca Locci; Italy	not awarded
Shot put	IF3	Jacob Cox; United States	not awarded	not awarded
Discus throw	IF3	Hameed Hasan; Iraq	not awarded	not awarded
Shot put	IF4	Robert Dominguez; United States	Gabriel Ramon; Australia	Matthew Cable; United States
Discus throw	IF4	Shane Bramley; Australia	Dariusz Cegiełka; Poland	Rafael Morfinenciso; United States
Shot put	IF5	Serhii Priadka; Ukraine	Saif Lami; Iraq	Kang Cha-soo; South Korea
Discus throw	IF5	Steven James; Australia	Thomas Laronce; France	Carlos Jimenez; United States
Shot put	IF6	Giuseppe Campoccio; Italy	Rustum Rosul; Ukraine	Wessam al-Kadhemy; Iraq
Shot put	IF7	Viktor Lehkodukh; Ukraine	Austin Parker; United States	Joel Rodriguez; United States
Discus throw	IF7	George Vera; United States	not awarded	not awarded
Shot put	IF8	Shane Rossall; United Kingdom	Valentin Ciolan Uță; Romania	Charlie Dye; United Kingdom
Discus throw	IF8	Carnell Martin; United States	Stephen French; Australia	Joshua Smith; United States

Women

Event	Class	Gold	Silver	Bronze
100 m	IT7	Emma Murfet; Australia	Chunte Gonzalez; United States	Heidi Dalhuisen; Netherlands
200 m	IT7	Lisa McCranie; United States	Emma Murfet; Australia	Chunte Gonzalez; United States
400 m	IT7	Jessica Garneau; Canada	Lisa McCranie; United States	Sally Renard; United Kingdom
1500 m	IT7	Sally Renard; United Kingdom	Jessica Garneau; Canada	Joanne Bradley; Canada
Long jump	IJ5	Vanessa Broughill; Australia	Emma Murfet; Australia	Angela Euson; United States
Shot put	IF1	Lisa Johnston; United Kingdom	Sabreen al-Dawahi; Iraq	not awarded
Discus throw	IF2	Rachel Williamson; United Kingdom	not awarded	not awarded
Shot put	IF4	Emma Murfet; Australia	Angela Euson; United States	Victoria Wales; United Kingdom
Discus throw	IF4	Chunte Gonzalez; United States	Joyce van den Waardenburg; Netherlands	Vanessa Broughill; Australia
Shot put	IF5	Beth Grauer; United States	Hyoshin Cha; United States	not awarded
Discus throw	IF5	Beth King; United States	not awarded	not awarded
Discus throw	IF 8	Lucy Holt; United Kingdom	Kristen Morris; United States	not awarded

Mixed

Event	Gold	Silver	Bronze
4 × 100 m relay	United States; Kionte Storey; Andrew Holliday; Ross Alewine; Matthew Cable	Canada; Rock Ferland; Garrett Powers; Jessica Garneau; David Malenfant	Belgium; Patrice Lombet; Wolf Wolput; Thierry Dutrieux; Peter Caubergh

=== Indoor rowing ===
Men

Event	Class	Gold	Silver	Bronze
Sprint	IR1	Micheal Nicholson; United States	not awarded	not awarded
Endurance	IR1	Micheal Nicholson; United States	not awarded	not awarded
Sprint	IR2	Nicolas Marfil; France	Brent Garlic; United States	Lenny Redrose; Australia
Endurance	IR2	Nicolas Marfil; France	Viktor Lehkodukh; Ukraine	Austin Parker; United States
Sprint	IR3	KC Higer; United States	Franck Poirot; France	Ihor Halushka; Ukraine
Endurance	IR3	Ihor Halushka; Ukraine	KC Higer; United States	Franck Poirot; France
Sprint	IR4	Peter Brown; Australia	Shane Rossall; United Kingdom	Patrick Levis; Canada
Endurance	IR4	James Saville; Australia	Patrick Levis; Canada	Peter Brown; Australia
Sprint	IR5	Ross Alewine; United States	Peter Brown; Australia	Dandy Alexander Wilson; United States
Sprint	IR5	Ross Alewine; United States	Gregory Quarles; United States	Ihor Bezkaravainyi; Ukraine
Endurance	IR5	Ross Alewine; United States	Peter Brown; Australia	Gregory Quarles; United States
Sprint	IR6	Matthew Model; Australia	Matthew Cable; United States	Phillip Fong, Jr. United States
Sprint	IR6	Matthew Model; Australia	Matthew Cable; United States	Przemysław Kowalski; Poland
Endurance	IR6	Matthew Model; Australia	Kasper Holm Henriksen; Denmark	Matthew Cable; United States

Women

Event	Class	Gold	Silver	Bronze
Sprint	IR3	Rachel Williamson; United Kingdom	not awarded	not awarded
Endurance	IR3	Kerrie Tessier; Australia	not awarded	not awarded
Sprint	IR5	Lucy Holt; United Kingdom	Emilea Mysko; Australia	Kelly Leonard; United Kingdom
Endurance	IR5	Lucy Holt; United Kingdom	Emilea Mysko; Australia	Beth King; United States
Sprint	IR6	Sarah Petchell; Australia	Lisa McCranie; United States	Victoria Ross; United Kingdom
Endurance	IR6	Victoria Ross; United Kingdom	Katrin Tukkia; Estonia	Sally Renard; United Kingdom
Endurance	IR6	Victoria Ross; United Kingdom	Katrin Tukkia; Estonia	Lisa McCranie; United States

=== Powerlifting ===
Event	Class	Gold	Silver	Bronze
Men's lightweight	IP4	Jacob Cox; United States	James Stride; United Kingdom	Antonio Auricchio; Italy
Men's middleweight	IP5	Jonathan Platt; United Kingdom	Ameer al-Graishi; Iraq	Falih al-Delfi; Iraq
Men's heavyweight	IP6	Gregory van Olm; Canada	Gabriel Ramon; Australia	Matthew Cable; United States
Women's lightweight	IP1	Taryn Barbara; Australia	Hyoshin Cha; United States	Emilea Mysko; Australia
Women's middleweight	IP2	Lisa McCranie; United States	Angela Euson; United States	Émilie Poulin; Canada
Women's heavyweight	IP3	Sarah Petchell; Australia	Chunte Gonzalez; United States	Joyce van den Waardenburg; Netherlands

=== Road cycling ===
Men

Event	Class	Gold	Silver	Bronze
Time trial	IHB1	Austin Parker; United States	Kim Jong-suk; South Korea	Lenny Redrose; Australia
Road race	IHB1	Lenny Redrose; Australia	Austin Parker; United States	Kim Jong-suk; South Korea
Time trial	IHB2	Janno Lepik; Estonia	Kim Young-min; South Korea	James Saville; Australia
Road race	IHB2	Janno Lepik; Estonia	Kim Young-min; South Korea	James Saville; Australia
Time trial	IReB1	Carlo Calcagni; Italy	Gregory Quarles; United States	Joshua Smith; United States
Road race	IReB1	Carlo Calcagni; Italy	Gregory Quarles; United States	Garrett Kuwada; United States
Time trial	IRB1	Na Hyeong-yoon; South Korea	Raphaël Legros; Belgium	Eric Estievenart; Belgium
Road race	IRB1	Raphaël Legros; Belgium	Na Hyeong-yoon; South Korea	not awarded
Time trial	IRB2	Francesco Mottola; Italy	Peter Caubergh; Belgium	Nicolas Melen; France
Road race	IRB2	Nicolas Melen; France	Peter Caubergh; Belgium	Francesco Mottola; Italy
Time trial	IRB3	Gérald Monnier; France	Kasper Holm Henriksen; Denmark	James Rogers; United Kingdom
Road race	IRB3	Gérald Monnier; France	Ashley Muir; Australia	Kasper Holm Henriksen; Denmark
Time trial	ITB1	Michael Murphy; United States	Jacob Cox; United States	not awarded
Road race	ITB1	Michael Murphy; United States	Jacob Cox; United States	not awarded

Women

Event	Class	Gold	Silver	Bronze
Time trial	IHB2	Tisha Knickerbocker; United States	Hyoshin Cha; United States	not awarded
Road race	IHB2	Tisha Knickerbocker; United States	Hyoshin Cha; United States	not awarded
Time trial	IReB1	Kerrie Tessier; Australia	Beth King; United States	Victoria Wales; United Kingdom
Road race	IReB1	Kerrie Tessier; Australia	Beth King; United States	Victoria Wales; United Kingdom
Time trial	IRB2	Kristen Morris; United States	Emilea Mysko; United States	not awarded
Road race	IRB2	Kristen Morris; United States	Emilea Mysko; United States	not awarded
Time trial	IRB3	Casey Turner; United States	Vanessa Broughill; Australia	Colleen Swifte; Australia
Road race	IRB3	Casey Turner; United States	Colleen Swifte; Australia	Lisa McCranie; United States

=== Swimming ===
Men

Event	Class	Gold	Silver	Bronze
50 m freestyle	ISA	Micheal Nicholson; United States	Austin Parker; United States	not awarded
50 m backstroke	ISA	Austin Parker; United States	Micheal Nicholson; United States	Rafal Konopka; Poland
50 m breaststroke	ISA	Micheal Nicholson; United States	not awarded	not awarded
50 m freestyle	ISB	Garrett Kuwada; United States	Antonio Auricchio; Italy	Ivan Lepekha; Ukraine
100 m freestyle	ISB	Garrett Kuwada; United States	Antonio Auricchio; Italy	Giuseppe Spatola; Italy
50 m backstroke	ISB	Andrii Badarak; Ukraine	Benito Versluijs; Netherlands	Garrett Kuwada; United States
50 m breaststroke	ISB	Ronald van Dort; Netherlands	Garrett Kuwada; United States	Andrii Badarak; Ukraine
50 m freestyle	ISC	Isaiah Staley; United States	Richard Gray; United Kingdom	Roberto Como; Italy
100 m freestyle	ISC	Isaiah Staley; United States	KC Higer; United States	not awarded
50 m backstroke	ISC	Isaiah Staley; United States	not awarded	not awarded
50 m breaststroke	ISC	Isaiah Staley; United States	A. al-Zahri; Iraq	KC Higer; United States
50 m freestyle	ISD	James Saville; Australia	Peter Brown; Australia	August O'Niell; United States
100 m freestyle	ISD	James Saville; Australia	Peter Brown; Australia	Andrew Blackburn; United States
50 m backstroke	ISD	Andrew Blackburn; United States	August O'Niell; United States	Nathan King; Australia
50 m breaststroke	ISD	August O'Niell; United States	Michael Murphy; United States	Andrew Blackburn; United States
50 m freestyle	ISE	Gert van 't Oever; Netherlands	Christopher O'Brien; Australia	Sean Walsh; United States
100 m freestyle	ISE	Gert van 't Oever; Netherlands	Christopher O'Brien; Australia	Andrew Wilkinson; Australia
50 m backstroke	ISE	Christopher O'Brien; Australia	Gert van 't Oever; Netherlands	Benjamin McComb; United Kingdom
50 m breaststroke	ISE	Christopher O'Brien; Australia	Gert van 't Oever; Netherlands	Rafal Rutkowski; Poland

Women

Event	Class	Gold	Silver	Bronze
50 m freestyle	ISC	Rachel Williamson; United Kingdom	Kerrie Tessier; Australia	not awarded
50 m backstroke	ISC	Rachel Williamson; United Kingdom	Kerrie Tessier; Australia	not awarded
50 m breaststroke	ISC	Rachel Williamson; United Kingdom	Kerrie Tessier; Australia	not awarded
50 m freestyle	ISD	Kristen Morris; United States	Kelly Leonard; United Kingdom	Lisa Johnston; United Kingdom
100 m freestyle	ISD	Kristen Morris; United States	Rachel Williamson; United Kingdom	Lisa Johnston; United Kingdom
50 m backstroke	ISD	Kristen Morris; United States	Kelly Leonard; United Kingdom	Lisa Johnston; United Kingdom
50 m breaststroke	ISD	Kristen Morris; United States	Kelly Leonard; United Kingdom	Lisa Johnston; United Kingdom
50 m freestyle	ISE	Taryn Barbara; Australia	Casey Turner; United States	Angela Euson; United States
100 m freestyle	ISE	Taryn Barbara; Australia	Casey Turner; United States	Angela Euson; United States
50 m backstroke	ISE	Angela Euson; United States	Taryn Barbara; Australia	Casey Turner; United States
50 m breaststroke	ISE	Taryn Barbara; Australia	Sally Renard; United Kingdom	Emma Murfet; Australia

Mixed

Event	Gold	Silver	Bronze
4 × 50 m freestyle relay	Australia; Andrew Wilkinson; James Saville; Peter Brown; Christopher O'Brien	United States; Sean Walsh; Robert Dominguez; August O'Niell; Ross Alewine	United States; Brett Campfield; Daniel Clarke; Andrew Blackburn; Garrett Kuwada

=== Team sports ===
Event	Gold	Silver	Bronze
Sitting volleyball	Poland	Georgia	United States
Wheelchair basketball	United States	Netherlands	United Kingdom
Wheelchair rugby	United States	United Kingdom	Australia

== Media and broadcast ==
The games were documented in a Netflix documentary called Heart of Invictus. Alex Jones and JJ Chalmers covered the event in a 6 episode nightly recap programme on BBC One from 17 to 22 April 2022. On 8 April 2022, the British embassy in The Netherlands announced the podcast series Invictus Voices, which features interviews with the competitors.
