= Special Olympics USA =

Sporting organization in the United States

Special Olympics USA is a sports organization for children and adults with intellectual disabilities in the United States. It is part of the global Special Olympics movement. Special Olympics was founded in 1968 with the main goal of accepting and welcoming individuals as they are. Special Olympics provides year-round training in Olympic based sports and is based in 204 countries.

== Special Olympics USA Games ==
The Special Olympics USA Games is a national Special Olympics event held every four years in the United States. The History of the special Olympics dates back to 1962 when Eunice Kennedy Shriver held day camp for athletes with intellectual disabilities. Six years later in 1968 the first ever International Special Olympics were held. 26 states along with representatives from Canada participated, and the games were held at Soldier Field in Chicago. At the original Special Olympic games only three sporting events were offered track and field, swimming, and floor hockey.

=== 2006 Special Olympics USA Games ===
The first, quadrennial, USA National Games were held July 1–8, 2006, in Ames, Iowa. The city of Ames and Iowa State University hosted over 3,000 athletes from all 50 states in 13 sports, including aquatics, basketball, bocce, bowling, golf, artistic gymnastics, rhythmic gymnastics, powerlifting, soccer, softball, tennis, track and field, and volleyball. Over 8,000 volunteers were needed to make this event run smoothly. Actor Tom Arnold, originally from Iowa, was the Master of Ceremonies for the Opening Ceremonies, and several other celebrities were at the event as well, including NFL quarterback Kurt Warner and actor Brandon Routh, both also Iowans. For the closing ceremony held at the Hilton Coliseum, there was a performance by Joe Dee Messina

- Aquatics – Held at Byer Hall at the university of Iowa. Representatives from 48 states competed.
- Basketball – Held at Ballard high school and Ames middle school. A total of 41 teams competed.
- Bocce – Held at Leid recreation center at the university of Iowa. 37 states were represented.
- Bowling – Held at Des Moines AMF lanes, 48 states were represented.
- Golf – Held at Ames golf & country club and Coldwater Golf Links. 41 states were represented.
- Gymnastics – Held at Ames high school 25 states were represented.
- Powerlifting – Held at Stephens auditorium campus art theater. 41 states were represented.
- Soccer – Held at the Iowa state university soccer fields. 21 states were represented.
- Softball – Held at River valley softball complex. 27 teams made up of 327 teams competed.
- Tennis – Held at forker tennis courts. 23 states were represented by 87 athletes.
- Track and Field – Held at Ames high school track. 49 states were represented by 499 athletes.
- Volleyball – Held at the University of Iowa’s Forker gymnasium. 16 teams comprising 188 athletes competed.

=== 2010 Special Olympics USA Games ===
Lincoln, Nebraska, hosted the Games, on July 18–23.

=== 2014 Special Olympics USA Games ===
The 2014 Special Olympics USA Games were held from June 14 to 21 in New Jersey. The Opening Ceremony was held at Prudential Center in Newark. Competition was held at venues throughout Mercer County including The College of New Jersey in the Trenton suburb of Ewing, Rider University, Princeton University and Mercer County Park. The budget for the event exceeded $15M. The Games Founding Partners included 21st Century Fox, Barnabas Health, HESS, KPMG, NJSEA, Prudential, PSE&G, ShopRite, Toys"R"Us and WWE. The ending ceremony consisted of a unified festival. The festival consisted of whiffle ball, bocce, kickball, football, soccer, and Zumba. The event was held to bring attention to the volunteers and the community of New Jersey.

Baseball was introduced as a sport at the USA Games for the first time, with four teams – from Alabama, Delaware, New Jersey, and Rhode Island. The gold– and bronze–medal games were played in Arm & Hammer Park in Trenton.

The triathlon was held for the first time.

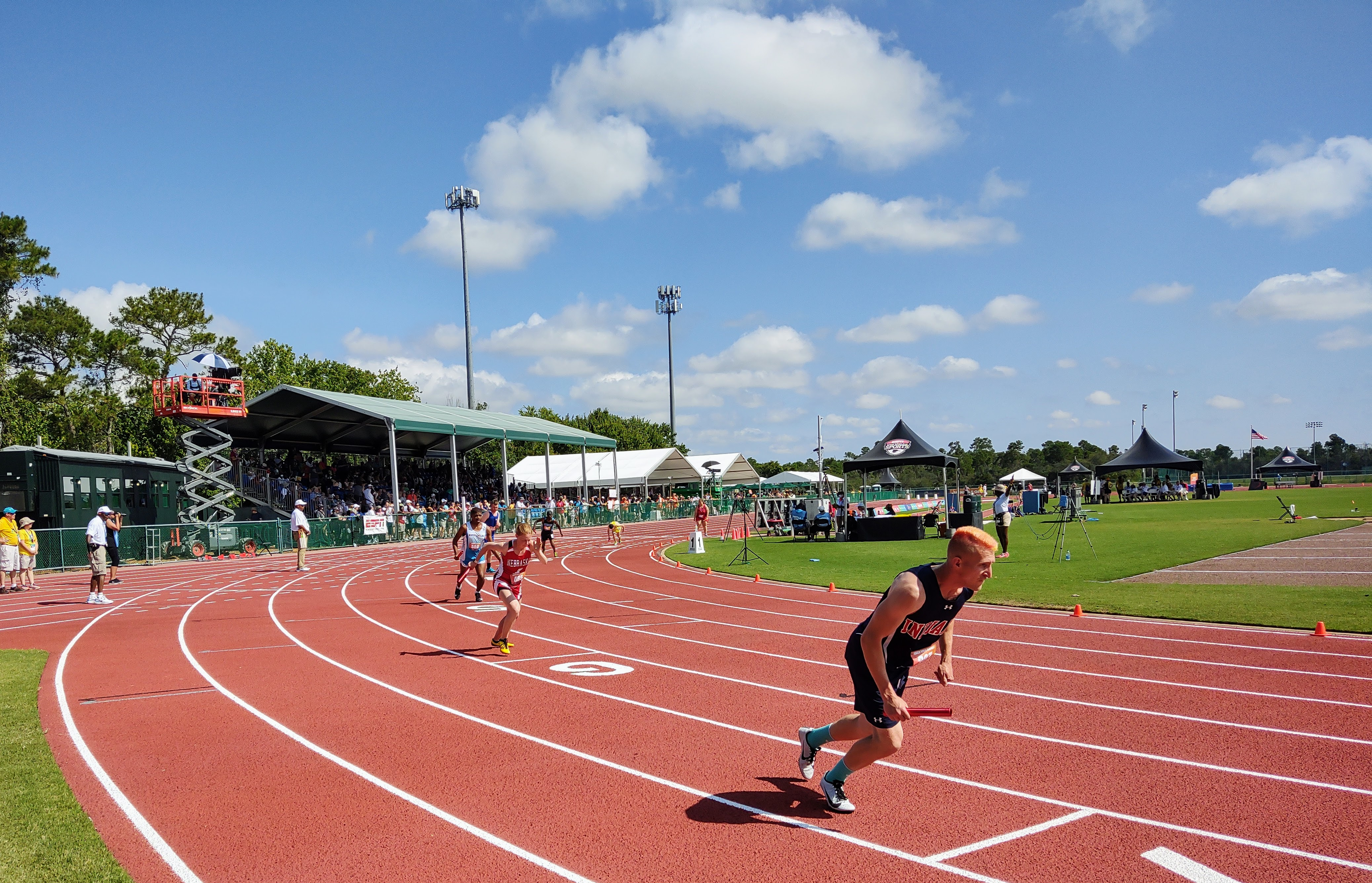
The 4 × 100 metres relay at the Special Olympics 2022 USA Games in Orlando, Florida.

=== 2018 Special Olympics USA Games ===
The 2018 Special Olympics USA Games were held in Seattle, Washington, from July 1–6, 2018. The USA Games featured more than 4,000 athletes competing in 14 different sports. The Opening Ceremony took place on July 1 at Husky Stadium and included a 2,000-person choir and musical performances from Allen Stone, Ann Wilson and Charlie Puth. The sporting events were held primarily on the University of Washington campus and in various venues around the region.

=== 2022 Special Olympics USA Games ===
The 2022 Special Olympics USA Games were held in Orlando, Florida, from June 5-11, 2022. The USA Games featured 5,500 athletes and coaches from all 50 states and The Caribbean. The opening ceremony was held on June 5 at Exploria Stadium and was produced by Disney Live Entertainment featuring performances from Sara Bareilles and others.

=== 2026 Special Olympics USA Games ===
The 2026 Special Olympics USA Games will be held in the Minneapolis-St. Paul Area. Most events will be held at the University of Minnesota campus. Two new sports have been added, pickleball and cornhole. Over 3,000 athletes are competing. These USA Games are largest games in terms of corporate involvement with 50 companies involved including Target, UnitedHealthcare, and Jersey Mike's Subs. Competitions including Softball, Flag Football, Soccer, etc where hosted at the National Sports Complex in Blaine Minnesota. Special performances at the opening ceremony will include Demi Lovato and Jon Batiste at Huntington Bank Stadium.

== See also ==
- Flame of Hope (Special Olympics)
- Special Olympics World Games
