= 2014 Invictus Games =

International multi-sport event in London, England

Invictus Games – London 2014
- Host city: London, United Kingdom
- Nations: 13
- Debuting countries: 13
- Opening: 10 September 2014
- Closing: 14 September 2014
- Opened by: Prince Harry
- Website: 2014.invictusgames.org

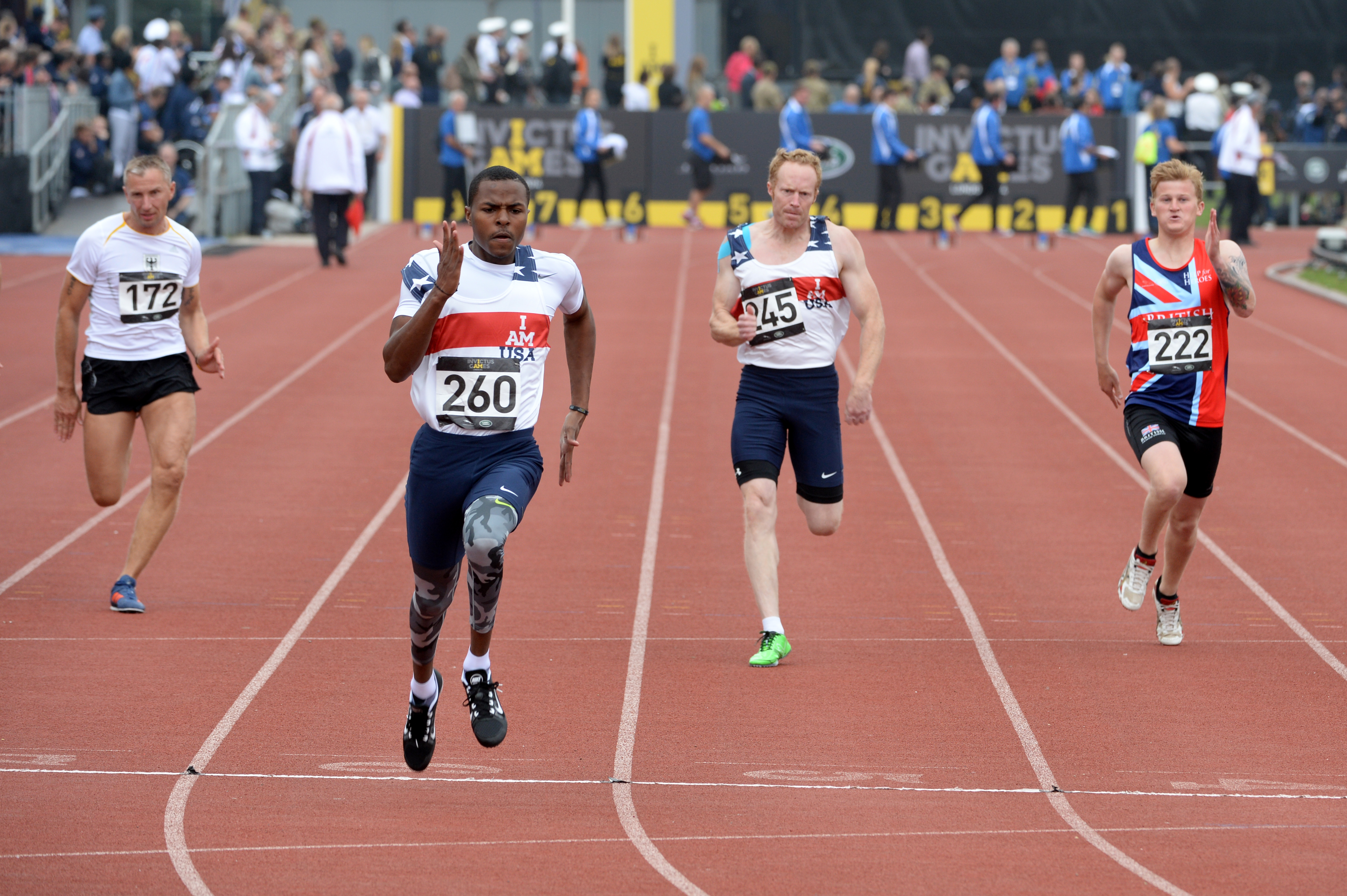
Four runners from Germany, the United Kingdom and the United States during a 100-metre qualifying heat at the 2014 Invictus Games

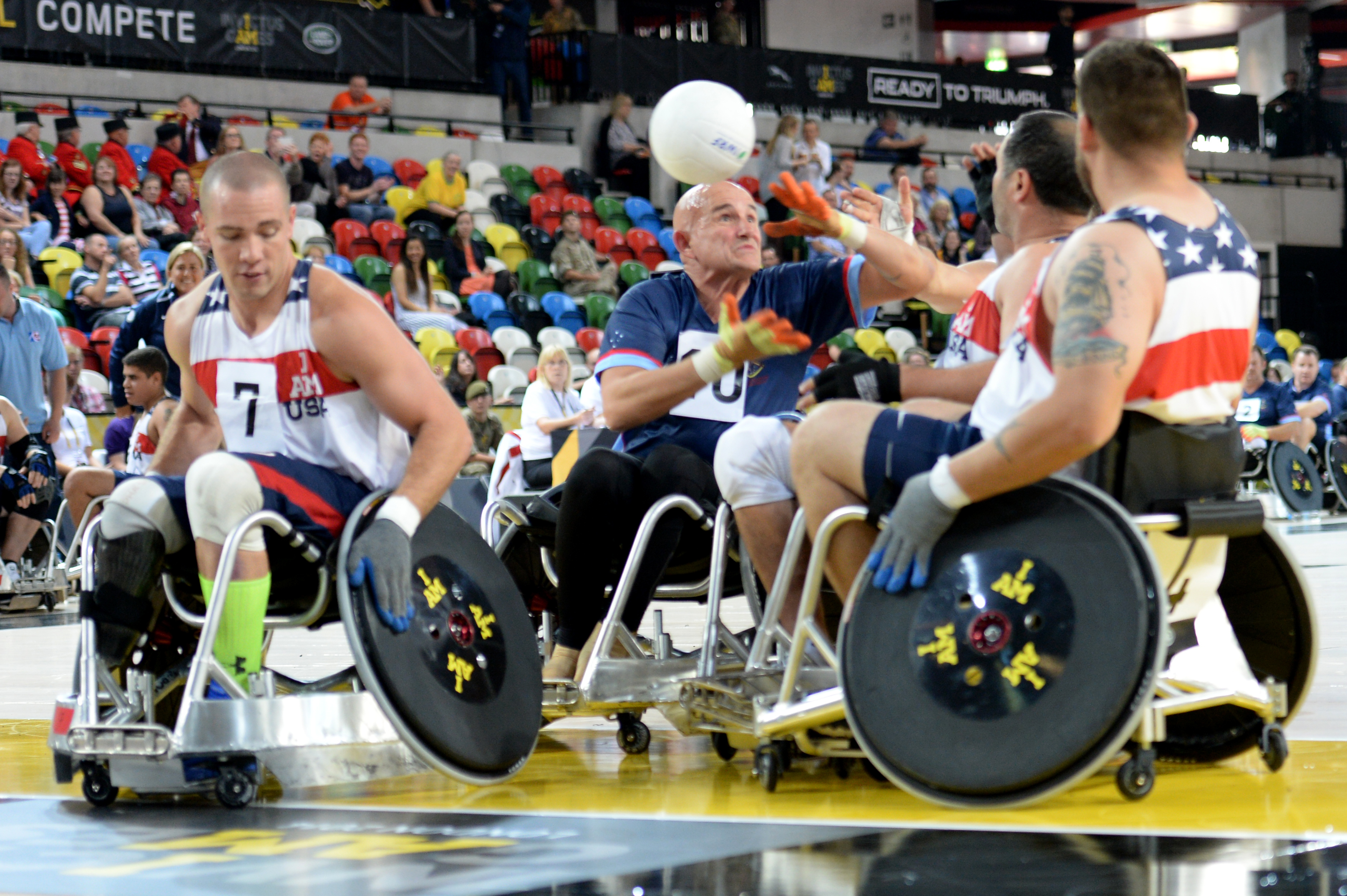
Three American defenders knock the ball away from an Australian player during a wheelchair rugby pool match between the United States and Australia at the 2014 Invictus Games

The 2014 Invictus Games were held on 10–14 September 2014. Around 300 competitors from 13 countries which have fought alongside the United Kingdom in recent military campaigns participated. These included the United States, Australia, Canada, France, Germany, Denmark, New Zealand and Afghanistan. Competitive events were held at many of the venues used during the 2012 Olympics, including the Copper Box and the Lee Valley Athletics Centre. The Games were broadcast by the BBC.

== Organising committee ==
- President: Prince Harry
- Chairman: Sir Keith Mills (former deputy chairman of the London Organising Committee of the Olympic Games and Paralympic Games)
- Lieutenant General Andrew Gregory (represents Defence on the Invictus Games Board)
- General Sir Nick Parker (was in charge with organising the military support provided by the Armed Forces during the London 2012 Games)
- Sara Donaldson (was chief operating officer of the production company for the London 2012 Olympic and Paralympic opening and closing ceremonies)
- Edward Lane Fox (private secretary of Prince Harry)
- Debbie Jevans (formerly director of sport for the London 2012 Olympic and Paralympic Games)
- Terry Miller (was general counsel for the London Organising Committee of the Olympic Games and Paralympic Games)
- Guy Monson (trustee of The Royal Foundation of The Duke and Duchess of Cambridge and Prince Harry)
- Roger Mosey (was the BBC's director of London 2012 Olympic Games coverage and former BBC editorial director)
- Mary Reilly (was also on the board of the London Organising Committee of the Olympic Games and Paralympic Games)
- Chris Townsend (was commercial director for the London Organising Committee of the Olympic and Paralympic Games)
- Sir Nathan Murray (was in charge of organising the arenas for the games to take place)

== Invited countries ==
14 countries were invited to the 2014 games, 8 from Europe, 2 from Asia, 2 from North America and 2 from Oceania. No countries from Africa were invited. There were teams from all the invited countries, except Iraq, competing in the games.

- Afghanistan
- Australia
- Canada
- Denmark
- Estonia
- France
- Georgia
- Germany
- Iraq (Did not participate)
- Italy
- Netherlands
- New Zealand
- United Kingdom
- United States

== Sporting events ==
Athletics (aka track & field), archery, indoor rowing, powerlifting, road cycling, sitting volleyball, swimming, wheelchair basketball and wheelchair rugby. The presenting partner Jaguar Land Rover also organised a driving challenge.

- Archery
- Driving competition
- Indoor rowing
- Paralympic athletics (aka track & field)
- Paralympic swimming
- Powerlifting
- Road cycling/Road para-cycling
- Sitting volleyball
- Wheelchair basketball
- Wheelchair rugby

== Closing concert ==
The closing concert was broadcast on BBC Two hosted by Clare Balding and Greg James. The concert was hosted by Nick Grimshaw and Fearne Cotton, with live performances from Foo Fighters, Kaiser Chiefs, James Blunt, Rizzle Kicks, Ryan Adams and Ellie Goulding.

== Venues ==
The following venues were used for Invictus 2014:

- Lee Valley Athletics Centre
- London Velopark
- Here East
- London Aquatics Centre
- Copper Box Arena
