= True Patriot Love Foundation =

- Founded: 2009.
- Type: Charity / Foundation
- Registration no.: 81464 6493 RR0001
- Headquarters: 150 York Street, Suite 1700, Toronto, Ontario, Canada
- Region served: Canada
- Chief Executive Officer: Nick Booth
- Website: truepatriotlove.com

True Patriot Love Foundation (founded 2009) is a Canadian national charity based in Toronto, Ontario. The organisation supports members of the Canadian Armed Forces, Veterans, and their families through grant funding, research, and advocacy. It focuses on improving well-being, inspiring recovery, strengthening families, and fostering connection between the military and civilian communities.

== History ==
The Foundation was incorporated on 13 March 2009 under the Canada Corporations Act as the True Patriot Love Foundation for the Support of Military Families. On 22 May 2014 the organisation adopted its current name, True Patriot Love Foundation.

Since its founding, the Foundation has expanded from local community grants to national initiatives addressing mental health, family support, and research into Veteran well-being. It led the successful bids to host the Invictus Games in Toronto 2017 and in Vancouver/Whistler 2025—making Canada the first country to host the Games twice.

== Mission and Strategic Focus ==
The Foundation’s mission is to support Canadian Armed Forces members, Veterans, and their families through grants, research, and advocacy. Its strategic focus areas include:

- Rehabilitation and recovery for those injured in service
- Mental-health and well-being programs
- Strengthening military families, including children and spouses
- Community connection and peer support
- Applied research and knowledge sharing on Veteran health and transition outcomes

== Programs and Funds ==
True Patriot Love administers several dedicated national funds and initiatives, including:

- Captain Nichola Goddard Fund – Supports women Veterans and their transition to civilian life.
- Bell True Patriot Love Fund – Funds mental-health and well-being initiatives for the military community.
- Local Community Fund – Provides grants to community-based organisations serving military families nationwide.
- Military Creative Arts Initiative – Supports creative arts and research programs that assist service members and Veterans in healing and self-expression.
- Veteran Hub – An online resource mapping programs, events, and volunteer opportunities for Veterans, serving members, and their families.

== Research and Impact ==
Through its Research Initiative, the Foundation funds studies in partnership with academic institutions such as the Canadian Institute for Military and Veteran Health Research (CIMVHR). Projects include research on women Veterans, the role of volunteerism, and the impact of the Invictus Games on Veteran recovery.

As of fiscal 2024, the Foundation reported revenues of C\$8.86 million and expenditures of C\$8.91 million, as per audited financial statements. Independent charity analysts report that the Foundation funded 40 programs across Canada in 2024, serving more than 1,000 active members of the Canadian Armed Forces and Veterans.

== Funding and Governance ==
True Patriot Love is a registered Canadian charity (Charitable Business Number 81464 6493 RR0001) headquartered in Toronto. The organisation is governed by a Board of Directors and led by Chief Executive Officer Nick Booth. The Foundation publishes annual reports and audited financial statements on its website, outlining grant distributions and program outcomes.

== Notable Activities ==
- Leadership of the Invictus Games Toronto 2017 and the upcoming Invictus Games Vancouver/Whistler 2025.
- Funding community programs addressing Veteran mental health, transition, and family resilience.
- Supporting research and arts-based recovery initiatives through national partnerships.

== See also ==
- Invictus Games
- Veterans Affairs Canada
- Canadian Armed Forces
- Canadian Institute for Military and Veteran Health Research
