= Children in Need =

UK charity of the BBC

- Also known as: BBC Children in Need
- Genre: Charity telethon
- Created by: BBC Studios
- Presented by: Current; as of 2026: Mel Giedroyc; Alex Jones; Rylan Clark; Sara Cox; Tyler West; (Former: See full list)
- Narrated by: Alan Dedicoat
- Country of origin: United Kingdom
- Original language: English

Production
- Production locations: BBC Television Centre (1980–2012); BBC Elstree Centre (2013–2020); Dock10 studios (2021–present)
- Camera setup: Multi-camera
- Running time: 5 mins – 7 hours
- Production companies: BBC Television; BBC Studios Entertainment Productions

Original release
- Network: BBC One; BBC Two
- Release: 21 November 1980 – present

Related
- Comic Relief (1988–present); Sport Relief (2002–2020); The Big Night In (2020)

BBC Children in Need is the BBC's UK charity dedicated to supporting disadvantaged children and young people across the country. Established in 1980, the organisation has raised more than £1 billion as of 2023 through its fundraising efforts.

The charity's flagship event is an annual telethon broadcast usually on the third Friday evening of November on BBC One and BBC Two. Pudsey Bear was its mascot, and Sir Terry Wogan hosted the event for 35 years. As a cornerstone of British television, Children in Need is one of the UK's two major telethons, alongside Comic Relief's Red Nose Day. It remains the BBC's sole in-house charity.

Originally broadcast from the BBC Television Centre, the telethon relocated to the BBC Elstree Centre between 2013 and 2020 following the closure of the former. Historically lasting up to seven hours, the event was streamlined to a three-hour programme (7:00 pm to 10:00 pm) from 2020 onwards. To accommodate family-friendly content, the television watershed is postponed until 11:30 pm on the night of the broadcast.

The 2020 telethon, impacted by the COVID-19 pandemic, featured a significantly reduced format with just four presenters: Mel Giedroyc, Alex Scott, Chris Ramsey, and Stephen Mangan. Since November 2021, the event has been staged at Dock10, MediaCityUK in Salford. In October 2023, it was announced that Lenny Rush—a children's television star and future Doctor Who actor—would become the first child co-presenter in the charity's history during the 2023 appeal broadcast. In October 2025, it was announced that Paddy McGuinness and TV personality and British rapper Big Zuu would debut in the presenting line-up for the 2025 appeal show.

== History ==
=== Earlier BBC appeals ===
The BBC's inaugural charity appeal was a five-minute radio broadcast on Christmas Day 1927, raising approximately £1,342 for four children's charities.

The first televised appeal, the Children's Hour, aired in 1955. Fronted by Harry Corbett and the yellow glove puppet Sooty Bear, these appeals continued annually on television and radio until 1979, raising a total of £625,836. Sir Terry Wogan made his debut during the five-minute appeal in 1978 and returned in 1979. Animated characters such as Peter Pan and Tom and Jerry occasionally featured in these broadcasts.

=== BBC Children in Need ===
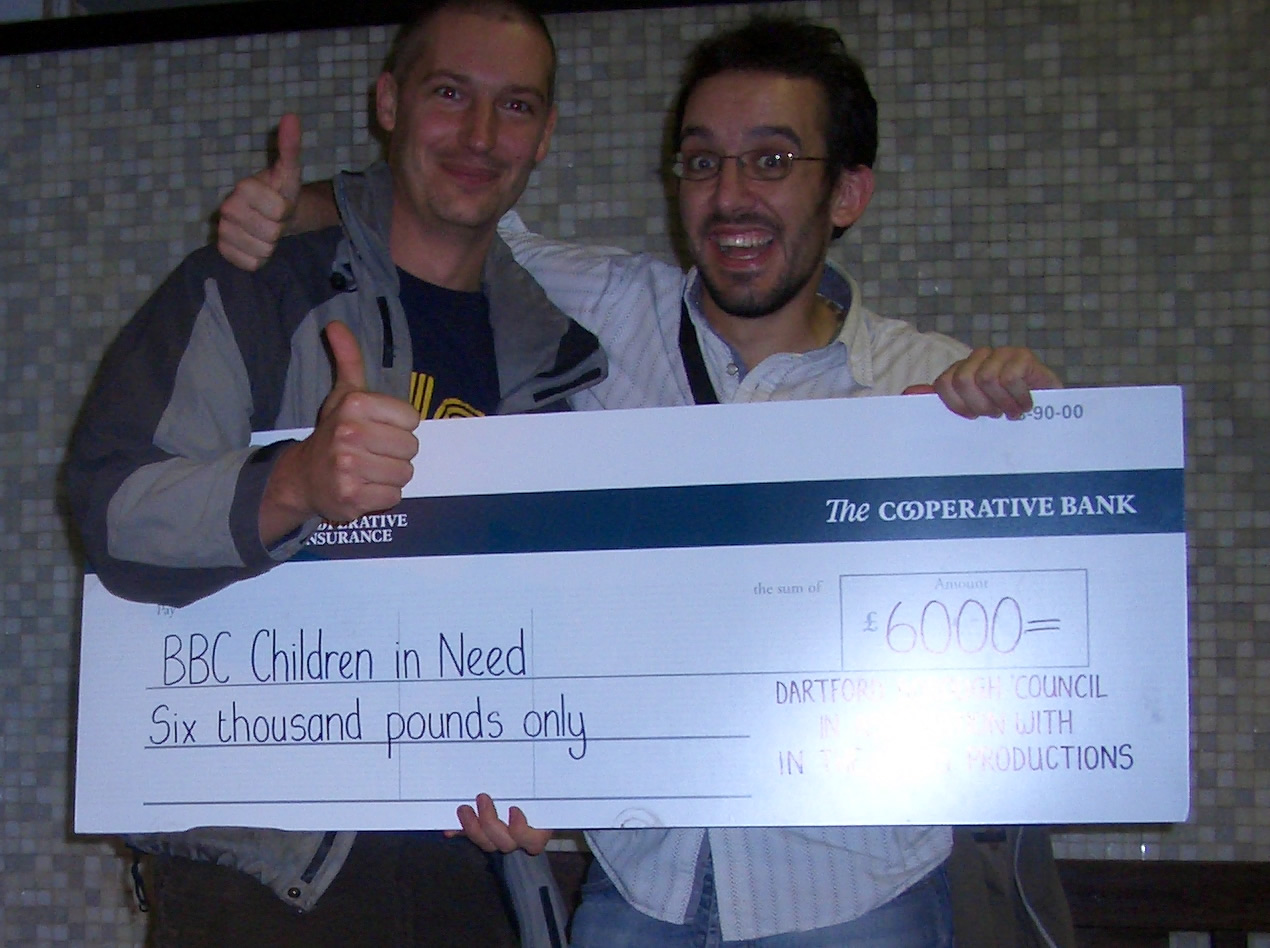
Dartford Borough Council raising funds for BBC Children in Need 2006

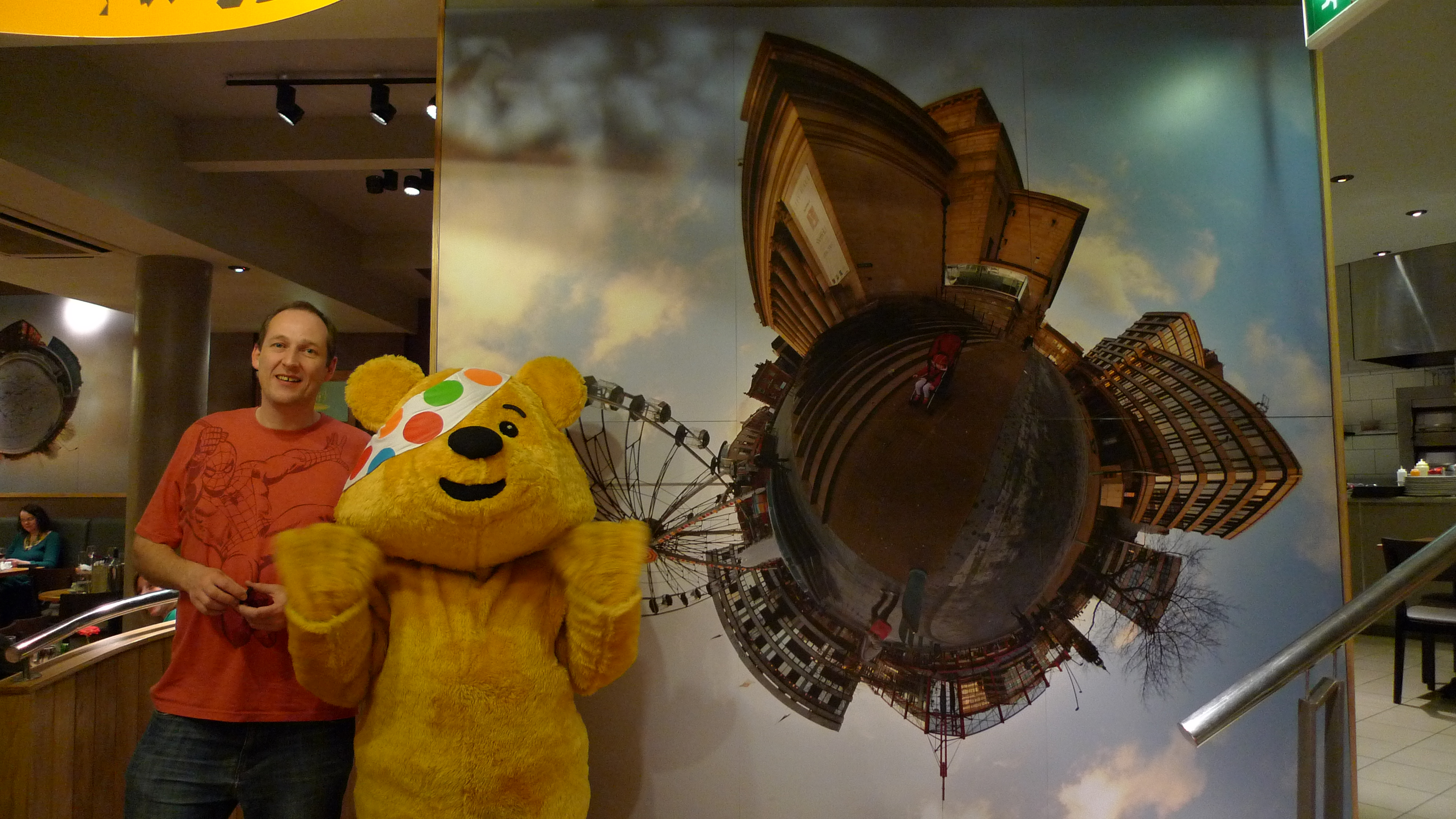
Pudsey Bear raising funds for BBC Children in Need 2009

The first dedicated Children in Need telethon aired in 1980, replacing standard continuity segments with fundraising appeals during evening programming. Presented by Terry Wogan, Sue Lawley, and Esther Rantzen, the event raised £1 million, exclusively for UK-based children's charities—a significant increase from previous campaigns.

By 1984, the telethon evolved into a single continuous programme, abandoning regular programming slots. The format expanded to include radio and online content, with Wogan remaining the primary host until 2014. In 2007, it was reported that Wogan had received an annual honorarium since 1980 (amounting to £9,065 in 2005); the BBC stated that the payment came from BBC resources rather than from the Children in Need charity fund. Two days before the 2007 event, Wogan waived his fee. He stepped down due to health issues and died in 2016.

In 1988, BBC Children in Need registered as a charity in England and Wales (no. 802052), followed by Scottish registration (SC039557) in 2008. A notable partnership in 2020 saw the charity collaborate with the McLaren Formula One Team at a race to support initiatives in Turkey.

In November 2006, Children in Need faced public criticism after Intelligent Giving published an article, titled "Four Things Wrong with Pudsey", which questioned the efficiency of its grant-giving model and the quality of some of its public reporting as "shambolic".

Simon Antrobus has been chief executive since 2016.

=== Sponsorships ===
Corporate partners have played a key role in fundraising. Asda, McDonald's, One Stop, Greggs, Enterprise, and Cineworld are among the charity's longstanding sponsors. Welcome Break—whose service stations host outlets such as WHSmith, Waitrose, Subway, Burger King, Pret a Manger, Starbucks and Harry Ramsden's—has also supported the cause. The 2025 Sidemen Charity Match raised funds for Children in Need.

== Criticism ==
A former BBC governor said that Jimmy Savile was kept away from Children in Need. Sir Roger Jones who was also chairman of the charity said he had suspicions about Savile a decade before the news of Savile's sexual abuse scandal came to public light in 2012. His comments came on the day an inquiry began into whether the BBC's child protection and whistle-blowing policies were acceptable.

In November 2006, Intelligent Giving published an article about Children in Need, which attracted wide attention across the British media. The article, titled "Four Things Wrong with Pudsey", described donations to Children in Need as a "lazy and inefficient way of giving" and pointed out that, as a grant-giving charity, Children in Need would use donations to pay two sets of administration costs. It also described the quality of some of its public reporting as "shambolic".

In 2007, it was reported that presenter Terry Wogan had been receiving an annual honorarium since 1980 (amounting to £9,065 in 2005). This made him the only celebrity paid for his participation in Children in Need. According to Wogan's account, he would "quite happily do it for nothing" and had "never asked for a fee". The BBC stated that the amount, which was paid from BBC resources rather than from the Children in Need charity fund, had "never been negotiated", having instead increased in line with inflation. Two days before the 2007 event, Wogan waived his fee.

There has been concern about the type of groups receiving funding from Children in Need. Writing in The Spectator, Ross Clark noted that funding goes towards controversial groups such as Women in Prison, which campaigns against jailing female criminals. Another charity highlighted was the Children's Legal Centre, which provided funding for Shabina Begum to sue her school as she wanted to wear the jilbāb. Clark pondered whether donors seeing cancer victims on screen would appreciate "that a slice of their donation would be going into the pockets of Cherie Blair to help a teenage girl sue her school over her refusal to wear a school uniform".

During November 2024, Rosie Millard stepped down as chair of BBC Children in Need after protesting over grants awarded to an LGBT youth charity whose former chief had been involved in a child abuse scandal.

== Sir Terry Wogan Fundraiser of the Year Award ==
The Sir Terry Wogan Fundraiser of the Year has been awarded annually since 2016 to individuals demonstrating exceptional commitment to raising funds for BBC Children in Need. Established by Wogan's family in memory of the late Terry Wogan—the charity's long-standing host—the award was first presented by his son, Mark, during the 2016 telethon. Subsequent ceremonies have featured notable presenters, including Joanna Lumley (2017) and Michael Ball (2021).

== Telethon ==
=== Acts ===
The telethon features performances by prominent singers, musical groups, and celebrities, often participating in sketches or musical numbers during the 6.5-hour-long programme. Notable appearances include actors from ITV programmes—sometimes in character or from their show's sets—as well as BBC newsreaders, whose performances became an annual tradition. Stars of West End musicals frequently perform excerpts from their productions after their theatre curtain calls.

=== Broadcast ===
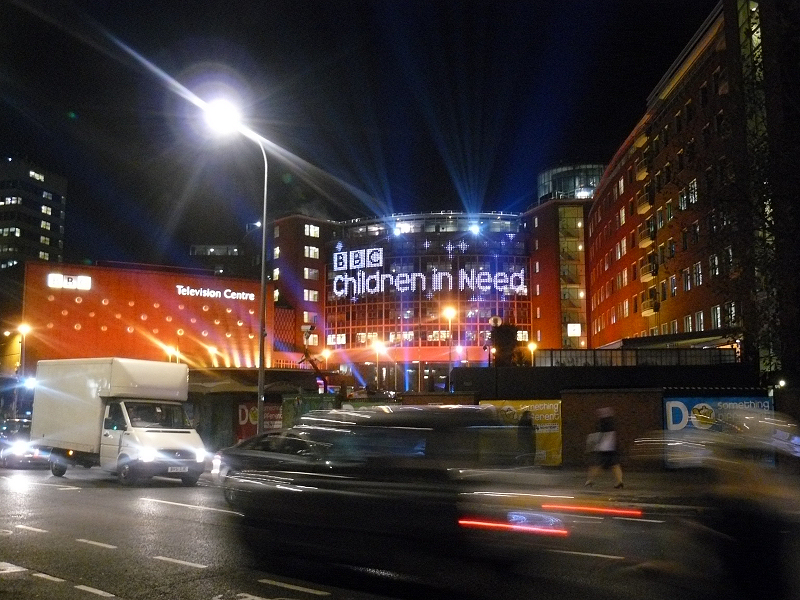
BBC Television Centre on the night of the 2008 telethon

BBC One historically dedicated its entire evening schedule to the telethon, pausing only for a 35-minute break at 10:00 pm to air BBC News at Ten, weather updates, and regional news. Simultaneously, BBC Two broadcasts complementary programming, such as Mastermind Children in Need, which is a form of Celebrity Mastermind. Pre-telethon specials include DIY SOS: The Big Build, Bargain Hunt, and The One Show, featuring challenges like the hosts' rickshaw ride and a celebrity edition of Pointless hosted by Alexander Armstrong and Richard Osman, assisted by Pudsey Bear.

Regional contributions play a significant role: BBC England's regions provide hourly 5–8-minute updates, while BBC Scotland, BBC Cymru Wales, and BBC Northern Ireland historically aired extended local segments before rejoining the network broadcast around 1:00 am. From 2010, however, these nations adopted the English regions' hourly update format.

Since 2011, a central feature of the telethon has been a live choir performance involving more than 1,000 children across 8–10 UK locations, singing in unison.

=== Annual telethon overview ===
No.	Broadcast date	Broadcast total	Total raised	Main presenter	Co-presenters	BBC One rating (millions)
1	21 November 1980	—N/a	£1,200,000	Sir Terry Wogan	Sue Lawley; Esther Rantzen	—N/a
2	20 November 1981	£508,625	£1,008,697	Sir Terry Wogan	Esther Rantzen	—N/a
3	26 November 1982	£603,440	£1,050,000	Sir Terry Wogan	Gloria Hunniford; Fran Morrison	—N/a
4	25 November 1983	£839,429	£1,158,737	Sir Terry Wogan	Gloria Hunniford; Fran Morrison	—N/a
5	23 November 1984	£1,459,283	£2,264,398	Sir Terry Wogan	Sue Cook; Joanna Lumley	—N/a
6	22 November 1985	£2,431,085	£4,476,780	Sir Terry Wogan	Sue Cook; John Craven; Joanna Lumley	—N/a
7	21 November 1986	£5,264,655	£8,687,607	Sir Terry Wogan	Sue Cook; Joanna Lumley	—N/a
8	27 November 1987	£8,735,657	£13,916,326	Sir Terry Wogan	Sue Cook	—N/a
9	18 November 1988	£13,099,246	£17,563,458	Sir Terry Wogan	Sue Cook; Joanna Lumley	—N/a
10	17 November 1989	£17,213,664	£21,671,931	Sir Terry Wogan	Sue Cook	—N/a
11	23 November 1990	£17,547,227	£20,921,929	Sir Terry Wogan	Sue Cook; Dave Benson Phillips	—N/a
12	22 November 1991	£17,182,724	£20,819,508	Sir Terry Wogan	Sue Cook; Andi Peters	—N/a
13	20 November 1992	£11,549,490	£16,700,000	Sir Terry Wogan	Sue Cook; Andi Peters	—N/a
14	26 November 1993	£12,386,866	£17,300,000	Sir Terry Wogan	Sue Cook; Andi Peters	—N/a
15	25 November 1994	£12,012,524	—N/a	Sir Terry Wogan	Sue Cook; Andi Peters	—N/a
16	24 November 1995	£11,843,385	—N/a	Sir Terry Wogan	Sue Cook; Gaby Roslin	—N/a
17	22 November 1996	£11,847,168	£18,700,000	Sir Terry Wogan	Gaby Roslin	—N/a
18	21 November 1997	£12,034,235	£20,900,000	Sir Terry Wogan	Gaby Roslin	—N/a
19	20 November 1998	£11,380,888	£17,900,000	Sir Terry Wogan	Gaby Roslin	—N/a
20	26 November 1999	£11,639,053	£16,700,000	Sir Terry Wogan	Gaby Roslin	6.61
21	17 November 2000	£12,244,764	£20,000,000	Sir Terry Wogan	Gaby Roslin	6.8
22	16 November 2001	£12,895,853	£25,900,000	Sir Terry Wogan	Gaby Roslin	7.12
23	15 November 2002	£13,501,375	£26,200,000	Sir Terry Wogan	Gaby Roslin	7.56
24	21 November 2003	£15,305,212	£31,400,000	Sir Terry Wogan	Gaby Roslin	10.49
25	19 November 2004	£17,156,175	£34,200,000	Sir Terry Wogan	Gaby Roslin	8.48
26	18 November 2005	£17,235,256	£33,200,000	Sir Terry Wogan	Fearne Cotton; Natasha Kaplinsky; Matt Allwright (Note: Outside broadcast presenter.)	9.07
27	17 November 2006	£18,300,392	£33,600,000	Sir Terry Wogan	Fearne Cotton; Natasha Kaplinsky; Chris Moyles	7.72
28	16 November 2007	£19,089,771	£37,500,000	Sir Terry Wogan	Fearne Cotton	9.56
29	14 November 2008	£20,991,216	£38,500,000	Sir Terry Wogan	Fearne Cotton; Tess Daly; Alesha Dixon	9.83
30	20 November 2009	£20,309,747	£40,200,000	Sir Terry Wogan	Tess Daly; Alesha Dixon; Peter Andre	10.08
31	19 November 2010	£18,098,199	£36,600,000	Sir Terry Wogan	Fearne Cotton; Tess Daly; Peter Andre	9.36
32	18 November 2011	£26,332,334	£46,100,000	Sir Terry Wogan	Fearne Cotton; Tess Daly; Alesha Dixon	10.01
33	16 November 2012	£26,757,446	£43,300,000	Sir Terry Wogan	Fearne Cotton; Tess Daly; Nick Grimshaw	8.22
34	15 November 2013	£31,124,896	£49,600,000	Sir Terry Wogan	Fearne Cotton; Tess Daly; Nick Grimshaw; Zoe Ball; Shane Richie	9.99
35	14 November 2014	£32,620,469	£49,100,000	Sir Terry Wogan	Fearne Cotton; Tess Daly; Nick Grimshaw; Rochelle Humes; Shane Richie	8.54
36	13 November 2015	£37,100,687	£55,000,000	Dermot O'Leary	Fearne Cotton; Tess Daly; Nick Grimshaw; Rochelle Humes; Shane Richie	7.95
37	18 November 2016	£46,624,259	£60,000,000	Tess Daly	Rochelle Humes; Greg James; Graham Norton; Ade Adepitan; Marvin Humes; Russell Kane	6.60
38	17 November 2017	£50,168,562	£60,750,000	Tess Daly	Rochelle Humes; Graham Norton; Ade Adepitan; Marvin Humes; Mel Giedroyc; Matt Edmondson	7.12
39	16 November 2018	£50,595,053	£62,072,000	Tess Daly	Graham Norton; Mel Giedroyc; Rochelle Humes; Marvin Humes; Ade Adepitan; Rob Beckett	6.44
40	15 November 2019	£47,886,382	£57,346,000	Tess Daly	Graham Norton; Mel Giedroyc; Rochelle Humes; Marvin Humes; Ade Adepitan; Tom Allen	6.13
41	13 November 2020	£37,032,789	£63,443,000	Mel Giedroyc	Alex Scott; Chris Ramsey; Stephen Mangan	5.12
42	19 November 2021	£39,389,048	£50,991,355	Mel Giedroyc	Ade Adepitan; Graham Norton; Chris Ramsey; Alex Scott	4.56
43	18 November 2022	£35,273,167	£43,400,000	Mel Giedroyc	Ade Adepitan; Jason Manford; Chris Ramsey; Alex Scott	3.96
44	17 November 2023	£33,513,325	£46,200,000	Mel Giedroyc	Ade Adepitan; Jason Manford; Chris Ramsey; Alex Scott; Lenny Rush	3.77
45	15 November 2024	£39,210,850	£52,700,000	Mel Giedroyc	Ade Adepitan; Vernon Kay; Chris Ramsey; Rochelle Humes; Lenny Rush	3.88
46	14 November 2025	£45,507,536	TBA	Mel Giedroyc	Vernon Kay; Paddy McGuinness; Lenny Rush; Rochelle Humes; Big Zuu	
47	13 November 2026	£38,720,170		Mel Giedroyc	Alex Jones; Mel Giedroyc; Rylan Clark; Sara Cox; Tyler West	

=== Children in Need Rocks ===
Year	Date	Broadcast date	Location	Organised by	Presenters	BBC One rating (millions)
2009	12 November 2009	19 November 2009	Royal Albert Hall	Gary Barlow	Chris Moyles; Fearne Cotton; Sir Terry Wogan	6.50
2011	17 November 2011		Manchester Evening News Arena	Gary Barlow	Chris Moyles; Fearne Cotton; David Tennant	4.50
2013	12–13 November 2013	14 November 2013	Hammersmith Apollo	Gary Barlow	Fearne Cotton; Chris Evans	4.41
2015	8 October 2015	12 November 2015	The SSE Arena, Wembley	BBC Studios	Sir Tom Jones; Rob Brydon	TBC
2016	1 November 2016	14 November 2016	Royal Albert Hall	BBC Studios	Fearne Cotton; Greg James	TBC
2017	19 October 2017	13 November 2017	The SSE Arena, Wembley	BBC Studios	Fearne Cotton; Sara Cox; Roman Kemp (backstage)	TBC
2018	7 November 2018	15 November 2018	The SSE Arena, Wembley	BBC Studios	Fearne Cotton; Clara Amfo	TBC

== Pudsey Bear ==
The original logo, used from 1980 to 1984

The very first Pudsey bear and logo, used in 1985

The mascot fronting the Children in Need appeal is called Pudsey Bear. He was created and named in 1985 by BBC graphic designer Joanna Lane, who worked in the BBC's design department. Asked to revamp the logo, with a brief to improve the charity's image, Lane said "It was like a lightbulb moment for me. We were bouncing ideas off each other and I latched on to this idea of a teddy bear. I immediately realised there was a huge potential for a mascot beyond the 2D logo". The bear was named after her hometown of Pudsey, West Yorkshire, where her grandfather was mayor.

A reproduction of the bear mascot (made of vegetation) is in Pudsey park, near the town centre. Originally introduced for the 1985 appeal, Pudsey Bear was created as a triangular logo depicting a yellow-orange teddy bear with a sad expression and a red bandana tied over one eye. The bandana had a pattern of small black triangles. Three circular black buttons running vertically down his front bore the white letters of "BBC". Perpendicular to the buttons, the words "children-in-need" appeared in all lower case along the base of the triangular outline. Accessibility for young readers, and people with disabilities including speech and reading challenges, were factors considered by the designer Joanna Ball, specifically the "P" sound in "Pudsey" name, and the choice of all lower-case sans-serif letters for the logotype.

The second Pudsey bear and logo, used from 1986 to 2006

The original design was adapted for various applications for use in the 1985 appeal in both 2D graphics and 3D objects. Items using the original 1985 design included a filmed opening title sequence, using cartoon cell animation, a postage stamp, and a prototype soft toy, commissioned from a film and TV prop maker (citation). The original prototype soft toy was orange and reflected the design of the logo, which was then adapted for approximately 12 identical bears, one for each regional BBC Television Studio. These bears were numbered and tagged with the official logo and auctioned off as part of the appeal. The number 1 Pudsey Bear was allocated to the Leeds region. Joanna Lumley appeared with one of the soft toys during the opening of Blackpool Illuminations and named Pudsey Bear the official mascot of the BBC Children in Need appeal.

In 1986, the logo was redesigned. Whilst retaining the concept of a teddy bear with a bandana over one eye, all other elements were changed. Specifically, the triangular elements of the underlying design were abandoned, and the corporate identity colour scheme was changed. The new bandana design was white with red spots, one of the buttons was removed and the logotype now appeared as building blocks, which spelled out "BBC CHILDREN IN NEED" in capital letters. Pudsey now had a smiling expression on his face rather than a sad one in the previous logo.

Third and final Pudsey bear and the previous Children in Need logo, used from 2007 to 2021

In 2007, Pudsey and the logo were redesigned again. This time, Pudsey's bandana had multicoloured spots, and all of the buttons were removed. By 2009, Pudsey had been joined by another bear, a brown female bear named "Blush". She had a spotty bow with the pattern similar to Pudsey's bandana pattern. In 2013, Moshi Monsters introduced Pudsey as an in-game item for 100 Rox.

The Children in Need 2015 campaign on 13 November 2015 marked the thirtieth birthday of Pudsey Bear, who has been the charity's mascot since 1985.

In 2022, as part of the corporate BBC rebrand, the logo was completely redesigned. The phrase "CHILDREN IN NEED" in capital letters appeared in a modified rounded version of BBC Reith Sans Bold, and Pudsey Bear was removed as part of the logo. Despite this, Pudsey Bear remains in use as a mascot and was also given a redesign which involved making the multicoloured spots on his bandana larger and adding multicoloured spots onto the soles of his now white feet.

== Official singles ==
Year	Artist(s)	Song(s)	UK Singles Chart
1980–1984	Not applicable		
1985	Clannad	"Almost Seems (Too Late to Turn)"	80
1986	The County Line	"'Heroes'"	DNC
1986	Ray Moore	"O' My Father Had A Rabbit"	24
1987	Ray Moore	"Bog Eyed Jog"	61
1988	Spirit of Play with Paul McCartney	"Children in Need"	72
1989	BBC Children in Need Choir	"If You Want To Help"	78
1989	Bruno Brookes and Liz Kershaw featuring Jive Bunny and Londonbeat	"It Takes Two"	53
1990	Bruno and Liz and the Radio 1 DJ Possee	"Let's Dance"	54
1991–1994	Not applicable		
1995	Patsy Palmer and Sid Owen	"You Better Believe It (Children in Need)"	60
1996	Red Hill Children	"When Children Rule The World"	40
1997	Lou Reed and Various Artists	"Perfect Day"	1
1998	Denise van Outen and Johnny Vaughan featuring Steps	"Especially for You"	3
1999	Martine McCutcheon	"Love Me"/"Talking in Your Sleep"	6
2000	S Club 7	"Never Had a Dream Come True"	1
2001	S Club 7	"Have You Ever"	1
2002	Will Young	"Don't Let Me Down" / "You and I"	2
2003	Shane Richie	"I'm Your Man"	2
2004	Girls Aloud	"I'll Stand by You"	1
2005	Liberty X	"A Night to Remember"	6
2006	Emma Bunton	"Downtown"	3
2007	Spice Girls	"Headlines (Friendship Never Ends)"	11
2008	McFly	"Do Ya/Stay with Me"	18
2009	Peter Kay's Animated All Star Band	"The Official BBC Children in Need Medley"	1
2010	JLS	"Love You More"	1
2011	The Collective^{1}	"Teardrop"	24
2012	Girls Aloud	"Something New"	2
2013	Ellie Goulding	"How Long Will I Love You"	3
2014	Gareth Malone's All Star Choir^{2}	"Wake Me Up"	1
2015	Jess Glynne	"Take Me Home"	6
2016	Craig David	"All We Needed"	42
2017	Katie Melua	"Fields of Gold"	29
2018	Jamie Cullum	"Love Is in the Picture"	DNC
2019	Jodie Whittaker	"Yellow"	DNC
2020	BBC Radio 2 Allstars^{3}	"Stop Crying Your Heart Out"	7
2021	Niall Horan and Anne-Marie	"Everywhere"	23
2022–2023	Not applicable		
2024	Girls Aloud	"I'll Stand by You" (Sarah's Version)	DNC
2025	Tom and Buzz Fletcher	"Thread of Hope"	DNC
2026	Texas	"Another Way to Cry"	DNC

Notes:

^1 The Collective includes Gary Barlow, Tulisa Contostavlos, Wretch 32, Ed Sheeran, Ms. Dynamite, Chipmunk, Mz Bratt, Dot Rotten, Labrinth, Rizzle Kicks and Tinchy Stryder.
^2 The All Star Choir includes Linda Robson, Jo Brand, Mel Giedroyc, Larry Lamb, Craig Revel Horwood, Alison Steadman, Alice Levine, John Craven, Fabrice Muamba, Margaret Alphonsi, Radzi Chinyanganya and Nitin Ganatra.
^3 BBC Radio 2's Allstars consists of Bryan Adams, Izzy Bizu, Cher, Clean Bandit, Melanie C, Jamie Cullum, Ella Eyre, Paloma Faith, Rebecca Ferguson, Jess Glynne, Sheku Kanneh-Mason, Lenny Kravitz, KSI, Lauv, Ava Max, Kylie Minogue, James Morrison, Gregory Porter, Nile Rodgers, Jack Savoretti, Jay Sean, Anoushka Shankar, Robbie Williams and Yola.

== See also ==
- ITV Telethon
- STV Children's Appeal
- Text Santa
