= Children in Need 2015 =

- Genre: Telethon
- Presented by: Dermot O'Leary; Tess Daly; Fearne Cotton; Shane Richie; Nick Grimshaw; Rochelle Humes
- Narrated by: Alan Dedicoat
- Country of origin: United Kingdom
- Original language: English

Production
- Production location: BBC Elstree Centre
- Camera setup: Multiple

Original release
- Network: BBC One; BBC Two
- Release: 13 November 2015

Related
- Children in Need 2014; Children in Need 2016

Children in Need 2015 is a campaign held in the United Kingdom to raise money for the charity Children in Need. 2015 marks the 30th birthday of the charity's mascot, Pudsey Bear, since 1985, and the 35th anniversary of the appeal which culminated in a live broadcast on BBC One and BBC Two on the evening of Friday 13 November until the early hours of Saturday 14 November. The broadcast was hosted by Dermot O'Leary, a last minute stand in for Sir Terry Wogan, with Tess Daly, Fearne Cotton, Rochelle Humes and Nick Grimshaw as co-hosts. Shane Richie hosted the period the show was broadcasting on BBC Two.

The show was broadcast from the BBC in Elstree but also includes regular regional opt-outs. Wogan did, however, appear in a pre-filmed Sketch and provided a documentary voice over, but was unable to present the live section of the fundraiser due to ill health, which was to be for the first and only time since its launch in 1980. Wogan died in January 2016, making Children in Need 2014 his last appearance as host.

== Telethon ==
The culmination of Children in Need was the live telethon broadcast on BBC One and BBC Two on 13 November from the BBC Elstree Centre.

=== Music ===
- Ellie Goulding - "Army"
- Children in Need Choir - "The Climb" A choir in the studio and in 9 other towns across the UK sung The Climb live in unison. The other 9 towns were: Gloucester, Belfast, Keswick, Great Yarmouth, Llandudno, Jersey, Blackpool, Glasgow and Arundel
- Jess Glynne - "Take Me Home"
- Rod Stewart - "Way Back Home"
- Peter Andre - "Come Fly With Me"
- Selena Gomez - "Same Old Love"
- Anastacia - "Left Outside Alone"
- Shane Filan & Nadine Coyle - "I Could Be"

=== Sketches ===
- EastEnders does "Top Hat"
- Call the Midwife does Strictly Come Dancing
- Warwick Davis finds "Star Wars Superfan", featuring Sir Terry Wogan
- Harry Hill 40 Years of Television with guest: Rebecca Hyland as Laa-Laa from Teletubbies and Barry Killerby as Mr Blobby

=== Local Opt-outs ===
As well as the main telethon the BBC Regions hosted their own events and provided coverage of where the money goes in their region. They handed coverage over to these from the main telethon 3 times throughout the first part of the telethon stopping around 10pm. Some of these events provided a choir in the Children in Need Choir

The events were held at:

- BBC East - Great Yarmouth at The Hippodrome
- BBC East Midlands - Derby at The Derby Arena
- BBC London - London at Tower Bridge
- BBC North East and Cumbria - Keswick at The Packhorse Court
- BBC Northern Ireland - Belfast at BBC Blackstaff House
- BBC North West - Blackpool at Blackpool Tower
- BBC Scotland - Glasgow at BBC Pacific Quay
- BBC South - Arundel at Arundel Castle
- BBC South East - Eastbourne at The Eastbourne Redoubt
- BBC South West - Jersey at Fort Regent
- BBC Wales - Llandudno at Venue Cymru
- BBC West - Gloucester at Gloucester Cathedral
- BBC West Midlands - Worcester at The Hive
- BBC Yorkshire - Bradford at Bradford City Hall
- BBC Yorkshire and Lincolnshire - Hull at Hull City Hall

The Choirs in the Children in Need Choir were at the main telethon in Elstree and the events in Gloucester, Belfast, Keswick, Great Yarmouth, Llandudno, Jersey, Blackpool, Glasgow and Arundel

=== Totals ===
The following are totals with the times they were announced on the televised show.

Date	Time	Total
13 November 2015	21:05	£15,171,304
13 November 2015	21:57	£23,069,187
14 November 2015	02:00	£37,100,687

== See also ==
- Children In Need
