= Children in Need 2018 =

UK charity campaign and telethon

- Genre: Telethon
- Presented by: Tess Daly; Ade Adepitan; Graham Norton; Mel Giedroyc; Rochelle Humes; Marvin Humes; Rob Beckett
- Narrated by: Alan Dedicoat
- Country of origin: United Kingdom
- Original language: English

Production
- Production location: BBC Elstree Centre
- Camera setup: Multiple
- Running time: 7:30 pm–2:00am

Original release
- Network: BBC One; BBC Two
- Release: 15 November – 17 November 2018

Related
- Children in Need 2017; Children in Need 2019

Children in Need 2018 was a campaign held in the United Kingdom to raise money for the charity Children in Need. It was the 39th Children in Need appeal show which was broadcast live on BBC One on the evening of Friday 16 November until the early hours of Saturday 17 November.

== Telethon ==
The culmination of Children in Need 2018 was broadcast on BBC One on 16 November from the BBC Elstree Centre.

=== Presenters ===
The presenters were:

Show	Date	Timeslots	Presenters	Channel(s)
Children in Need Rocks 2018	15 November 2018	20:30-22:00	Fearne Cotton; Clara Amfo	BBC One; BBC One HD
The One Show	16 November 2018	19:00-19:30	Alex Jones; Shane Richie; Matt Baker	BBC One; BBC One HD
Main show	16 November 2018	19:30-20:30	Tess Daly; Ade Adepitan	BBC One; BBC One HD
Main show	16 November 2018	20:30-22:00	Graham Norton; Mel Giedroyc	BBC One; BBC One HD
Junior Mastermind Special for Children in Need	16 November 2018	22:00-22:40	Stephen Mangan	BBC Two; BBC Two HD
Main show	16/17 November 2018	22:40-00:30	Marvin Humes; Rochelle Humes; Rob Beckett	BBC One; BBC One HD
Children in Need Rocks 2018 (repeat)	17 November 2018	00:30-02:00	Fearne Cotton; Clara Amfo	BBC One; BBC One HD

=== Music ===
- Jamie Cullum performing the Children in Need Single - Love is in the Picture
- The London West End cast of School of Rock perform a medley of the show.
- The Children in Need Choir perform A Million Dreams from The Greatest Showman. 1466 children sang live in unison from the studio in Elstree and in Southampton, St Ives, Belfast, Chester, Lincoln, Glasgow, Cardiff and Wolverhampton

=== Features ===
- Call the Midwife Christmas special 2018 first look exclusive
- Cast of EastEnders does Disney
- Boyzone does Strictly Come Dancing
- Doctor Who Series 11 (2018) Episode 7 Preview

=== Local Opt-outs ===
The BBC Regions all hosted events which provided a more local idea of where the money was being spent with updates throughout the first part of the telethon finishing around 22:00

These events were held at:

- BBC East - Norwich at Norwich Castle
- BBC East Midlands - Derby at The QUAD
- BBC London - London at KidZania
- BBC North East and Cumbria - Carlisle at The University of Cumbria
- BBC Northern Ireland - Belfast at The Ulster Folk and Transport Museum
- BBC North West - Chester at Storyhouse
- BBC Scotland - Glasgow at BBC Pacific Quay
- BBC South - Southampton at King Edward VI School
- BBC South East - Brighton at The i360
- BBC South West - St Ives at Tate
- BBC Wales - Cardiff at The Broadcasting House
- BBC West - Bristol at The Bottle Yard Studios
- BBC West Midlands - Wolverhampton at The Grand Theatre
- BBC Yorkshire - Chesterfield at Barrow Hill Roundhouse
- BBC Yorkshire and Lincolnshire - Lincoln at The New Theatre Royal

As well as the Main Studio, The events at Southampton, St Ives, Belfast, Chester, Lincoln, Glasgow, Cardiff and Wolverhampton all hosted a choir of around 150 children to be in the Children in Need Choir

=== Totals ===
The following are totals with the times they were announced on the televised show.

Time	Amount (£)
20:40	£14,361,881
21:58	£33,949,774
00:25	£50,595,053

== Removal of promotional video ==
Axel Rudakubana's appearance in a promotional trailer for the campaign (pictured) prompted its removal following his involvement in the 2024 Southport stabbings.

Following the 2024 Southport stabbings, it was discovered that the accused perpetrator Axel Muganwa Rudakubana had starred at the age of 11 in a promotional trailer for Children in Need 2018 where he was dressed as the Tenth Doctor. Following the attack and subsequent revealing of Rudakubana's identity, the BBC removed the advert featuring him from its platforms. Ology Kids Casting, who cast him for the advert, also deleted all references to him from their social media.

== See also ==
- Children In Need
