= Children in Need 2014 =

- Genre: Telethon
- Presented by: Sir Terry Wogan; Tess Daly; Fearne Cotton; Shane Richie; Nick Grimshaw; Rochelle Humes
- Narrated by: Alan Dedicoat
- Country of origin: United Kingdom
- Original language: English

Production
- Production location: BBC Elstree Centre
- Camera setup: Multiple

Original release
- Network: BBC One; BBC Two
- Release: 14 November 2014

Related
- Children in Need 2013; Children in Need 2015

Children in Need 2014 was a campaign held in the United Kingdom to raise money for the charity Children in Need. It was the 34th such appeal, culminating in a live broadcast on BBC One and BBC Two on the evening of Friday 14 November until the early hours of Saturday 15 November. The broadcast was hosted by Sir Terry Wogan, with Tess Daly, Fearne Cotton, Rochelle Humes and Nick Grimshaw as co-hosts. Shane Richie hosted the period the show was broadcast on BBC Two. The show was broadcast from BBC Elstree Centre but also includes regular regional opt-outs. Wogan didn't present the 2015 appeal because of ill health, and later died in January 2016, making this his last one.

== Telethon ==
The culmination of Children in Need was the live telethon broadcast on BBC One on 14 November from the BBC Elstree Centre. Viewers could donate throughout the night by telephone, online, the 'iPudsey' mobile app or at a later date from amenities such as banks or by post.

=== Music ===
- S Club 7 performed a medley of their hits 'S Club Party', 'Reach', 'Bring It All Back' and 'Don't Stop Movin''
- The Script performed 'Superheroes'
- One Direction performed 'Steal My Girl' and 'Night Changes'
- The cast of EastEnders performed a Grease medley
- Rixton performed 'Wait On Me'
- Donny Osmond & Laura Wright performed 'Don't Give Up'
- Cheryl performed 'Only Human'
- Boyzone performed "Reach Out (I'll Be There)"
- Gareth Malone's All Star Choir performed a cover of 'Wake Me Up'
- Susan Boyle performed a cover of 'Wish You Were Here'
- The Children's Choir performed a special'I'll Stand By You' The choir in the studio linked up live with Choirs in 9 towns across the UK. The towns were: Bradford, Norwich, Newport (Wales), Birmingham, Belfast, Plymouth, Blackpool, Chatham and Glasgow

=== Features ===
- Tom and Jerry: A Fundraising Adventure
- The Ghosts of Ian Beale
- Call the Midwife Christmas Special Preview
- Doctor Who Christmas Special
- EastEnders (GreaseEnders)
- Strictly Come Dancing Children In Need Special

=== Totals ===
The following are totals with the times they were announced on the televised show.

| Date | Time | Total |
|---|---|---|
| 14 November 2014 | 20:53 | £7,546,805 |
| 14 November 2014 | 21:57 | £17,167,283 |
| 14 November 2014 | 23:38 | £25,405,603 |
| 14 November 2014 | 00:50 | £29,581,133 |
| 14 November 2014 | 02:00 | £32,620,469 |

== Local Coverage ==
As well as the main telethon the BBC Regions Hosted their own events which provided coverage of fundraising in their local area. These events were featured on the Regional News at 6:30 and then in 3 opt-outs during the first part of the main telethon.

The Events were held at:

- BBC East - Norwich at The Forum
- BBC East Midlands - Loughborough at Loughborough Central railway station
- BBC London - London at Broadcasting House
- BBC North East and Cumbria - Stockton on the High Street
- BBC Northern Ireland - Belfast at BBC Blackstaff House
- BBC North West - Blackpool at Blackpool Tower
- BBC Scotland - Glasgow at BBC Pacific Quay
- BBC South - BBC South held 4 events as part of the Pudsey Dash each event was shown in one of the opt-outs these events were at Bracknell at the John Nike Leisure Centre, Reading at Reading University Students Union, Newbury at St Bartholomew's School and Oxford at The BBC Studios
- BBC South East - Chatham at Chatham Historic Dockyard
- BBC South West - Plymouth at Plymouth Life Centre
- BBC Wales - Newport at the Newport Centre
- BBC West - Wells at the Wookey Hole Caves
- BBC West Midlands - Birmingham at Think Tank
- BBC Yorkshire - Bradford at Bradford College
- BBC Yorkshire and Lincolnshire - Grimsby at Grimsby Auditorium

== Media ==
This year's Children in Need song is by Gareth Malone and his All Star Choir and is a cover of the Avicii track "Wake Me Up". It was released for download on 9 November 2014.

As part of the telethon, an animated film titled Superheroes Unite for BBC Children in Need was shown. It featured the voices of Daniel Craig, Helena Bonham Carter, Abbey Clancy, Paul Hollywood, Tom Jones, and Louis Smith.

== Other programmes and campaigns ==
In addition to the main telethon, several other BBC programmes and services have been fundraising for the appeal.

== See also ==
- Children In Need
