= Children in Need Rocks 2013 =

2013 UK charity concert

- Genre: Music concert
- Presented by: Fearne Cotton; Chris Evans
- Country of origin: United Kingdom
- Original language: English

Production
- Production locations: Hammersmith Apollo, London, England
- Camera setup: Multiple

Original release
- Network: BBC One
- Release: 14 November 2013

Related
- Children in Need Rocks Manchester

Children in Need Rocks
- Genre: Music concert
- Dates: 12–13 November 2013
- Locations: Hammersmith Apollo, London, England
- Years active: 2009–2013
- Founders: Gary Barlow
- Website: Official site

Children in Need Rocks 2013 was a two-part charity music concert held at the Hammersmith Apollo in London, England, on 12 and 13 November 2013. The concert was organised by Take That singer-songwriter Gary Barlow as one of a series of events to raise money for Children in Need 2013. It is the third and last Children in Need Rocks concert organised by Barlow, after Children in Need Rocks the Royal Albert Hall in 2009 and Children in Need Rocks Manchester in 2011.

== Performances ==
(Broadcast on BBC One)

- Kings of Leon – "Use Somebody" and "Supersoaker"
- Little Mix – "Change Your Life"/"DNA"/"Wings"
- Rizzle Kicks – "Skip to the Good Bit"
- Keane – "Everybody's Changing"
- Tom Odell – "Grow Old with Me" and "I Just Want to Make Love to You" (with Nicole Scherzinger from The Pussycat Dolls)
- Robbie Williams – "Shine My Shoes" and "Go Gentle"
- Ellie Goulding – "Burn"
- Tom Jones – "What Good Am I?"
- Bastille – "Pompeii"
- Dizzee Rascal – "Love This Town"
- Barry Manilow – "Copacabana" and "Could It Be Magic" (with Gary Barlow and Robbie Williams)
- Madness – "My Girl" and Baggy Trousers (with Rizzle Kicks)
- The Wanted – "I Found You" / "Show Me Love (America)" / "We Own the Night" medley
- Gary Barlow with Agnetha Fältskog (from ABBA) – "I Should've Followed You Home"
- Passenger – "Let Her Go"
- Jeff Lynne – "Livin' Thing" and "Mr. Blue Sky"

== See also ==
- Children in Need 2013
