= Children in Need 2005 =

- Genre: Telethon
- Presented by: Terry Wogan; Fearne Cotton; Natasha Kaplinsky; Matt Allwright
- Voices of: Alan Dedicoat
- Country of origin: United Kingdom

Production
- Production locations: BBC Television Centre; RAF Brize Norton
- Camera setup: Multiple

Original release
- Network: BBC One
- Release: 18 November – 19 November 2005

Related
- Children in Need 2004; Children in Need 2006

Children in Need 2005 was a campaign held in the United Kingdom to raise money for the charity Children in Need. It culminated in a live broadcast on BBC One on the evening of Friday 18 November and was hosted by Terry Wogan, Fearne Cotton, Natasha Kaplinsky and, from RAF Brize Norton, Matt Allwright. The voice over was Alan Dedicoat. A total of £17,235,256 was raised by the closing minute.

According to the Broadcasters' Audience Research Board (BARB), overnight ratings suggested that 10.7 million viewers were tuned into BBC One from 9.00pm to 9.15pm (a 45.1% audience share), the slot in which the Doctor Who mini-episode was broadcast in most regions. This represented the highest ratings that Children in Need had received in eight years.

== Television campaign ==
=== Artist performances ===
- Girls Aloud performed their song "Biology" on stage at RAF Brize Norton
- Katie Melua performed a cover of Canned Heat's 1968 song "On the Road Again"
- KT Tunstall performed "Suddenly I See" live from Glasgow
- Pussycat Dolls performed their version of "Sway" from the film Shall We Dance?
- Madonna performed "Get Together" and "Hung Up"
- The Corrs performed "Old Town"

Also appearing were Status Quo, Westlife (live from Belfast), Sugababes (live from Wrexham), Rod Stewart, Craig David, Bryan Adams and Melanie C, and Katherine Jenkins and G4 and ZOO.

=== Cast performances ===
- The cast of Emmerdale performed their version of High Society
- The BBC News team performed their own rendition of Queen's "Bohemian Rhapsody".
- Amy Nuttall sang numbers from My Fair Lady
- The cast of radio soap The Archers performed a live episode on stage.
- The London cast of The Lion King, led by Brown Lindiwe Mkhzi, performed "Circle of Life".
- The cast of Bad Girls performed their version of Elvis Presley's "Jailhouse Rock"
- The cast of Casualty, Elyes Gabel and Luke Bailey performed a rendition of The Beatles song "I Saw Her Standing There".

=== Others ===
- Bruce Forsyth presented a special edition of Strictly Come Dancing called Strictly Tap Dancing.
- Lauren Cooper picked a fight with Peggy Mitchell in The Queen Vic in a special EastEnders short starring Catherine Tate, Barbara Windsor, Lacey Turner and Kacey Ainsworth.
- David Tennant began his adventures as the Tenth Doctor in a special short episode of Doctor Who also starring Billie Piper.
- The premiere of the Texas's promotional video for their song "Sleep" featuring comedian Peter Kay.
- Jon Culshaw lampooned Terry Wogan and Prime Minister Tony Blair in a sketch featuring Blair himself making a plea for people to donate.
- Kim Medcalf performed a big band version of Soft Cell's "Tainted Love".
- Liam Mower performed "Electricity" from Billy Elliot the Musical.
- In a UK television première of the illusion, magician Scott Penrose performed The Impossible Sawing, a new "box-less" version of the sawing a woman in half illusion, on host Fearne Cotton.

=== Regional Opt-Outs ===
After a 5 year hiatus between 2001 and 2004, Children in Need 2005 saw the return of the regional outside broadcasts. The main programme would return to these events at various points throughout the night and give people a more local idea of where the money was going.

An incomplete list of the opt out locations:

- BBC East - Milton Keynes at Xscape
- BBC East Midlands - Leicestershire at East Midlands Airport
- BBC London - London - Outside BBC Television Centre
- BBC North East and Cumbria - Gateshead at The Sage
- BBC North West - Manchester at the Belle Vue Stadium
- BBC South - Helicopter round Bovington at The Tank Museum, Salisbury at Downtown Leisure Centre and Portsmouth at the United Services Rugby Club
- BBC South East - Gillingham - Black Lion Leisure Centre
- BBC South West - Plymouth at The Piazza on Armada Way
- BBC West -
- BBC West Midlands - Birmingham at The Mailbox
- BBC Yorkshire - Leeds at Millennium Square
- BBC Yorkshire and Lincolnshire -

BBC Wales, BBC Scotland and BBC Northern Ireland hosted their own telethons separate from the main one. These were from:

- BBC Wales - Wrexham - Llwyn Isaf
- BBC Scotland - Glasgow at The Broadcasting House on Queen Margaret Drive
- BBC Northern Ireland - Belfast at BBC Blackstaff House

== Official single ==
Liberty X recorded the official single for 2005's appeal. The band recorded a cover of Shalamar's 1982 song "A Night to Remember" for the charity. The single peaked at Number 6 on the UK singles chart.
