= Children in Need 2013 =

- Genre: Telethon
- Presented by: Sir Terry Wogan; Fearne Cotton; Tess Daly; Nick Grimshaw; Zoe Ball; Shane Richie
- Narrated by: Alan Dedicoat
- Country of origin: United Kingdom
- Original language: English

Production
- Production location: BBC Elstree Centre
- Camera setup: Multiple

Original release
- Network: BBC One; BBC Two
- Release: 15 November 2013

Related
- Children in Need 2012; Children in Need 2014

Children in Need 2013 is a campaign held in the United Kingdom to raise money for the charity Children in Need. 2013 marked the 33rd anniversary of the appeal which culminated in a live broadcast on BBC One and BBC Two on the evening of Friday 15 November until the early hours of Saturday 16 November. The broadcast was hosted by Sir Terry Wogan, with Tess Daly, Fearne Cotton, Zoe Ball and Nick Grimshaw as co-hosts.

The show was broadcast from the BBC in Elstree but also included regular regional opt-outs. The 2013 appeal marked the first Children in Need broadcast from BBC Elstree Centre after the closing down of the show's previous home Television Centre. Its new studio, adjacent to the set of EastEnders enabled the show to include live segments and performances from the fictional Albert Square including star interviews in The Queen Victoria Pub, hosted by cast member Shane Richie.

Children in Need set a new fundraising record, raising the highest amount in its history, £5,000,000 more than its previous telethon, by raising a total of £31.1 million on the night. The campaign for the year ended in July 2014 when it was announced that the entire campaign raised £49.6 million.

== Telethon ==
The Children in Need telethon was broadcast live on BBC One on 15 November from the BBC Elstree Centre. Viewers could donate throughout the night by telephone, online, the 'iPudsey' mobile app or at a later date from amenities such as banks or by post.

=== Running order ===
- Performance from the cast of the Royal Shakespeare Company's Matilda.
- JLS performance of a selection of their hits, partly from the EastEnders Albert Square set.
- Exclusive excerpt from Doctor Who anniversary special episode "The Day of the Doctor".
- Strictly Come Dancing special in which Jane Torvill and Christopher Dean competed against each other.
- Children's choirs in various regional locations simultaneously performed the Gary Barlow song "Sing".
- Special edition of Room 101 with children as the guests, trying to get brushing your teeth, parents trying to be cool and girls who won't go out with the participant into Room 101.
- One Direction performed their song "Best Song Ever".
- "Take On Me" music video spoof, starring Harry Hill, Sinitta, Cheryl Ferguson, Richard Madeley, Tom Ellis, Will Mellor, Sophie Raworth, Nick Hewer, Warwick Davis, Hairy Bikers, Peter Andre and Barbara Windsor.
- "ATLHG" music video spoof, starring Toby Anstis, Clare Buckfield, Perri Kiely, Danielle Hope, Charles Dance and Katya Zamolodchikova.
- The cast of EastEnders danced to a medley of Daft Punk's "Get Lucky" as arranged by composer Mathieu Karsenti.
- The cast of Call the Midwife performed many songs including "Why Do Fools Fall in Love".
- Ellie Goulding performed "How Long Will I Love You?".
- Highlights of Children in Need Rocks shown.
- Tinie Tempah performed "Children of the Sun".
- James Arthur performed "You're Nobody 'til Somebody Loves You".
- Catherine Tate's Nan at Holby City.
- Ylvis performing "The Fox".
- Rita Simons performed "Valerie" on the Albert Square set.
- Bands McFly and Busted performed a medley of their hits.
- Repeat of "Take On Me" spoof.
- Battle of the boy bands between McFly and JLS first round.
- The cast of musical Spamalot performed "Always Look on the Bright Side of Life".
- Singer Dido performed "Thank You".
- Repeat of Room 101 Children's sketch.
- Battle of the Boy Bands Round 2.
- Wet Wet Wet performed "Love Is All Around".
- Repeat of EastEnders cast performed "Get Lucky".
- Battle of the Boy Bands Round 3.
- Lip Sync Challenge between Greg James and Russell Kane.
- Repeat of Ellie Goulding performed "How Long Will I Love You?".
- Repeat of Holby City sketch.

=== Appeals ===
Kylie Minogue, Emeli Sandé, Tom Jones, Miranda Hart, Gary Barlow, Hugh Dennis, Cheryl Cole and Darcey Bussell introduced and narrated videos that demonstrated the work of organisations funded by Children in Need and how they have helped various children and their families cope with problems such as illness, bereavement and poverty.

=== Totals ===
The following are totals with the times they were announced on the televised show.

Date	Time	Total
15 November 2013	20:50 UTC	£6,942,321
15 November 2013	22:00 UTC	£15,702,605
15 November 2013	23:45 UTC	£24,755,565
16 November 2013	01:21 UTC	£28,871,483
16 November 2013	02:00 UTC	£31,124,896

The total for the entire appeal, as announced on 3 July 2014, was £49.6 million an increase of £6 million from the previous year's appeal.

=== Local opt-outs ===
Early in the programme, opt-outs were included so that viewers could get an idea of the fundraising held in their local area and how the money is being spent. These included events from a variety of locations around the UK:

- BBC Northern Ireland -Broadcasting House, Belfast
- BBC Scotland - BBC Pacific Quay
- BBC Wales - The College, Merthyr Tydfil
- BBC North West - Z-Arts, Manchester
- BBC North East and Cumbria - Hexham Market Place
- BBC Yorkshire - National Media Museum, Bradford
- BBC Yorkshire and Lincolnshire - Sirius Academy, Kingston upon Hull
- BBC West Midlands - Library of Birmingham
- BBC East Midlands - Nottingham Tennis Centre
- BBC East - Wicksteed Park, Kettering
- BBC London - Tower of London
- BBC South East - Bluebell Railway
- BBC South - National Motor Museum, Beaulieu
- BBC South West - National Maritime Museum Cornwall, Falmouth
- BBC West - Roman Baths, Bath

Bath, Belfast, Manchester, Falmouth, Glasgow, Birmingham, Kettering, Merthyr Tydfil and Hexham each provided a choir of around 150 children to join up with the choir in the studio as part of the Children in Need Choir to sing a nationwide performance of Sing by Gary Barlow

== Media ==
This years Children in Need song is by Ellie Goulding and is titled "How Long Will I Love You?". It was released for download on 10 November 2013.

== Other programmes and campaigns ==
In addition to the main telethon, several other BBC programmes and services have been fundraising for the appeal:

- Two charity concerts, entitled Children in Need Rocks, were held on Tuesday 12 and Wednesday 13 November at the Hammersmith Apollo in London. Organised by Gary Barlow, the two events were televised in a combined programme broadcast on BBC One on 14 November. Performers scheduled to appear include Gary Barlow, Robbie Williams, Kings of Leon, Dizzee Rascal, Little Mix, Barry Manilow, The Wanted, Ellie Goulding, Rizzle Kicks, Bastille, Passenger, The Lumineers, Tom Odell, Tom Jones, Madness and Keane. Viewers were able to text donations in throughout the show, raising £1,711,575 for the charity.
- Celebrities and members of the public were encouraged to go 'Bear Faced' for Children in Need by not wearing make up for the day.
- Following on from the successful event in previous years, magazine programme The One Show completed a rickshaw challenge with the team riding around the clock from Northern Ireland to London. The challenge raised £1,354,459.
- A special edition of DIY programme DIY SOS was broadcast on 13 November. The special episode saw the team travel to Peterborough, building from scratch a new centre for Children in Need funded project Little Miracles. The new premises built had a value of £1 million, despite the budget being no larger than for an ordinary episode of the programme. Viewers were able to text in donations of £5 throughout the programme and they raised £464,234.
- On 15 November 2013, a celebrity edition of the game show Pointless aired with celebrities taking part including Terry Wogan, Lee Mack, Bobby Ball, McFly and Esther Rantzen.
- A special edition of daytime programme Bargain Hunt was broadcast featuring celebrity guests Strictly Come Dancing partners Anton du Beke, Erin Boag, Lilia Kopylova and Darrenn Bennett.
- As in previous years, rural affairs programme Countryfile sold a calendar comprising the winners of their Photographic Competition. They raised £657,511.
- As part of the previous appeal, BBC Radio 4's Today programme asked listeners to create a skin for a DAB Digital Radio to mark the move of the BBC to New Broadcasting House, London. The winning design, by David Hampson, continues to be sold by the company in aid of Children in Need.
- BBC Radio 4 launched an auction on 9 November for opportunities to meet the presenters of many of their most popular programmes and have a look behind the scenes of how they are made.
- BBC Radio 2 held several events including a gala night of Charlie and the Chocolate Factory the Musical, the annual Car Fest classic car event held in both the north and south of England and an auction on The Chris Evans Breakfast Show for Once in a Lifetime experiences. They raised £4,187,522.
- BBC Radio 3 released two charity singles involving the BBC Philharmonic Orchestra and the Halle Orchestra; a female ensemble singing Wings mixed with the Ride of the Valkyries and a male ensemble singing What Makes You Beautiful mixed with Anvil Chorus.

== Commercial partners ==
In addition to the BBC's programmes several other companies took part in the fundraising.

- Supermarket Asda sold merchandise and clothing in aid of the campaign as well as taking part in fundraising events in store. They raised £700,000 for Children in Need in time for the telethon.
- DIY chain B&Q sold merchandise and held fundraising events in their stores. They raised £525,000.
- Pharmacy chain Boots sold merchandise, held fundraising events and championed the 'Bear faced' campaign. They raised £1 million for the charity.
- BT held fundraising events and operated the call centres used throughout the evening.
- The warehouse club Costco held fundraising events in their stores for the charity.
- Furniture retailer dfs held fundraising events including completing endurance challenges while carrying a sofa. They raised £625,000.
- Bakery firm Greggs sold merchandise, Children in Need themed baked products and held fundraising events. They raised £953,000.
- Car company Peugeot held the UK's largest car wash, nicknamed 'Get Sudsy for Pudsey'.
- The Post Office exclusively sold temporary paw print tattoos as part of the 'Bear Faced' campaign as well as being a place where fundraising monies can be paid in. Their efforts raised £1,079,324 for the charity.
- Motorway service station operator Welcome Break held fundraising events throughout the year including asking visitors to the toilets to 'Spare a penny when they Spend a penny'.
- Soft toy company Build-A-Bear Workshop allowed visitors to build their own Pudsey and Blush toys and held pyjama parties at their stores.
- Coinstar allowed fundraising monies to be paid into their machines.
- Currys and PC World sold wristbands in their stores.
- Department store chain Debenhams sold merchandise including exclusive designer T-shirts. They raised £553,000.
- Haven Holidays took Pudsey on a journey around the UK by as many different means of transport as possible.
- Catelogue company Lakeland sold Pudsey themed products.
- Confectioners Lindt donated 10% of profits from their bear chocolates to the charity.
- Entertainment company Mind Candy introduced a pudsey character into their Moshi Monsters website game with money being donated relative to the number of people who get the character.
- Banks NatWest and The Royal Bank of Scotland allowed the public to donate from their ATM's.
- Club and Charities Rotary International, Round Table and Ladies Circle used their nationwide support network to raise money for the charity.
- The educational paper the Times Educational Supplement offered packs and advice for schools so that they may hold events to raise money for the charity.

== See also ==
- Children In Need
- Pudsey Bear
