= Children in Need 2006 =

UK television special

- Genre: Telethon
- Presented by: Terry Wogan; Fearne Cotton; Natasha Kaplinsky; Chris Moyles
- Voices of: Alan Dedicoat
- Country of origin: United Kingdom

Production
- Production location: BBC Television Centre
- Camera setup: Multiple
- Running time: 500 minutes

Original release
- Network: BBC One
- Release: 17 November – 18 November 2006

Related
- Children in Need 2005; Children in Need 2007; Celebrity Scissorhands

Children in Need 2006 was a campaign held in the United Kingdom to raise money for Children in Need. It culminated in a live broadcast on BBC One on the evening of Friday 17 November and was hosted by Terry Wogan, Natasha Kaplinsky, Fearne Cotton and Chris Moyles. The voice-over reading out money raised at various points was Alan Dedicoat. On average, the broadcast brought in 7.72m viewers and raised a total of £18,300,392 by the closing minute.

== Television campaign ==
=== Artist performances ===
- All Saints
- Emma Bunton
- Deacon Blue
- Alesha Dixon
- The Feeling
- Nelly Furtado
- Girls Aloud
- Jamiroquai
- Keane
- Ronan Keating
- Lemar
- The Magic Numbers
- McFly
- Katie Melua
- Dannii Minogue
- Nerina Pallot
- Status Quo
- Sugababes
- Sandi Thom
- Westlife
- Amy Winehouse

=== Cast performances ===
- The BBC News team performed a tribute to the James Bond films
- The cast of Two Pints of Lager and a Packet of Crisps performed Wham!'s "Club Tropicana"
- The cast of Holby City performed Madonna's "Hung Up"
- The cast of Bad Girls performed Bananarama's "Love in the First Degree"
- Chris Fountain, Andrew Moss, Gemma Merna and Carley Stenson from Hollyoaks performed "Unbelievable" by EMF in London whilst Gerard McCarthy, also from Hollyoaks, duetted with Sheila Ferguson live from Belfast.

=== Others ===
- West end performances from the casts of Daddy Cool, Guys and Dolls, Evita, The Sound of Music, Avenue Q and the award-winning musical Wicked.
- The new voice of the BT Speaking clock for the next 20 years was announced as Sara Mendes da Costa, a telemarketer and part-time voiceover artist.
- The winner of reality show Celebrity Scissorhands was announced.
- Rory Bremner performed a standup routine which lampooned many famous political people.
- QI broadcast a "Children in Need" episode on BBC Two when the news was on BBC One. The theme of the episodes was "Descendents" and featured Jonathan Ross, Phill Jupitus and Rich Hall.

== Official single ==
Emma Bunton recorded the official single for 2006's appeal. The Baby Spice recorded a cover of Petula Clark's 60s classic Downtown especially for the charity. The single peaked at Number 3 on the UK Singles Chart.

== Regional Outside Broadcasts ==
Each region hosted an events in various locations around the UK. The main programme would return to these events at various points throughout the night and give people a more local idea of where the money was going.

The locations were:

- BBC East - Duxford at The Imperial War Museum
- BBC East Midlands - Leicestershire at East Midlands Airport
- BBC London - London at Covent Garden
- BBC North East and Cumbria - Gateshead at The Sage
- BBC North West -
- BBC South - Portsmouth at The Spinnaker Tower
- BBC South East - Brighton at the Grand Brighton Hotel
- BBC South West - Cornwall at The Eden Project
- BBC West - Bristol at The Maritime Heritage Centre at the SS Great Britain
- BBC West Midlands - Birmingham at The Mailbox
- BBC Yorkshire - Leeds at The Royal Armouries
- BBC Yorkshire and Lincolnshire -

BBC Wales, BBC Scotland and BBC Northern Ireland hosted their own telethons separate from the main one. These were from:

- BBC Wales - Cardiff at the Broadcasting House They also hosted a concert in Colwyn Bay at Eirias Park
- BBC Scotland - Glasgow at The Broadcasting House on Queen Margaret Drive
- BBC Northern Ireland - Belfast at BBC Blackstaff House

== Totals ==
The following are totals with the times they were announced on the televised show.

- At 17 November 2006 23:40 GMT the total raised was £9,684,158
- At 18 November 2006 00:40 GMT the total raised was £12,608,849
- At 18 November 2006 01:03 GMT the total raised was £16,052,161
- At 18 November 2006 01:47 GMT the total raised was £16,950,588
- At 18 November 2006 02:19 GMT the total raised was £18,300,392

The most recent total shown for the 2006 appeal was shown on the official website on 24 June 2007 at 18:40 GMT as £30,194,659
