= Children in Need 2007 =

- Genre: Telethon
- Presented by: Terry Wogan; Fearne Cotton
- Voices of: Alan Dedicoat
- Country of origin: United Kingdom

Production
- Production location: BBC Television Centre
- Camera setup: Multiple
- Running time: 480 minutes

Original release
- Network: BBC One, BBC Two
- Release: 16 November – 17 November 2007

Related
- Children in Need 2006; Children in Need 2008; Celebrity Scissorhands

Children in Need 2007 was a campaign held in the United Kingdom to raise money for Children in Need. It culminated in a live broadcast on BBC One on the evening of Friday 16 November, through to the morning of Saturday 17 November. The broadcast was hosted by Terry Wogan and Fearne Cotton, joined by other guest presenters throughout the night. The voice over reading out hourly totals was Alan Dedicoat. The event broke all previous records with a total of £19,089,771 raised by the closing minute. The show's average audience was 9.56 million, a huge amount higher than the previous year's event.

== Television campaign ==
=== Artist performances ===
- Lee Mead opened the show with "Any Dream Will Do" from Joseph and the Amazing Technicolour Dreamcoat, linking up with children's choirs around the country
- Sam & Mark performed "Try a Little Tenderness"
- Jason Donovan performed his 1989 hit "Too Many Broken Hearts"
- The Spice Girls performed their new single, "Headlines (Friendship Never Ends)", this year's official Children in Need single.
- John Barrowman and Myleene Klass performed "Your Song"
- The professional dancers from Strictly Come Dancing performed a group routine
- Leona Lewis sang the current number-one single, "Bleeding Love"
- Irish boy band Boyzone reformed to perform a medley of their songs
- Joss Stone sang "Baby Baby Baby"
- Kylie Minogue performed "2 Hearts"
- The cast of the stage version of Dirty Dancing performed the routine to "(I've Had) The Time of My Life"
- The Sugababes performed their number-one single, "About You Now"
- Westlife performed their cover of Michael Bublé's "Home"
- David Gray sang "Babylon"
- A second performance by the Spice Girls, this time their 1998 hit single "Stop"
- Annie Lennox performed "Sing" from her 2007 album Songs of Mass Destruction, followed by "Sweet Dreams (Are Made of This)" from her time in Eurythmics
- Lee Mead performed again, this time singing his new single "Gonna Make You a Star"
- McFly performed a selection of their songs, notably including the official 2005 Red Nose Day song "All About You"
- The West End cast of Grease performed "You're the One That I Want" and "We Go Together"
- Denise Van Outen performed the Dusty Springfield song, "The Look of Love"
- The cast of Footloose performed a selection from the show including "Footloose", and "Let's Hear It for the Boy"
- The Songbirds performed their song "Wake Up Call"
- Blake performed a cover of The Beach Boys' song "God Only Knows"
- The cast of the 2007 West End revival of stage musical Rent performed "Seasons of Love" (featuring a second appearance from Denise Van Outen)
- Runrig performed a special version of their classic track Loch Lomond, which was re-released for Children in Need on BBC Scotland's version of the show.

=== Cast performances ===
- The cast of Hollyoaks performed a tribute to Marc Bolan
- The cast of Holby City performed a tribute to Aretha Franklin
- The cast of EastEnders paid tribute to The Beatles to celebrate the fortieth anniversary of Sgt. Peppers Lonely Hearts Club Band (shown twice throughout the broadcast)
- The cast of The Bill performed a medley of Rat Pack numbers
- The BBC News team made their customary contribution in the form of a performance of "All That Jazz" from stage musical Chicago
- BBC Breakfast weather presenter Carol Kirkwood and sports correspondent Chris Hollins performed the duet "Baby It's Cold Outside"

=== Others ===
- The Shaolin Monks gave a martial arts performance
- A special episode of Doctor Who called "Time Crash" filmed for Children in Need starring David Tennant and Peter Davison and written by Steven Moffat (shown twice throughout the broadcast)
- A special Junior Dragons' Den with young inventors and entrepreneurs pitching to the Dragons (shown twice throughout the broadcast)
- A special episode of Hotel Babylon featuring a guest appearance from Prunella Scales as Sybil Fawlty, along with other iconic figures from BBC sitcom history who replaced the current staff. These included Paul Shane (as Ted Bovis, from Hi-de-Hi!), June Whitfield (as June Medford from Terry and June), Frank Thornton (as Captain Peacock from Are You Being Served?), Vicki Michelle (as Yvette Carte-Blanche from 'Allo 'Allo!) Lesley Joseph (as Dorien Green from Birds of a Feather) and Tony Adams (as Adam Chance from Crossroads).
- An episode of Never Mind the Buzzcocks featuring DJs from BBC Radio 1 (Tony Blackburn, Fearne Cotton and Chris Moyles) versus BBC Radio 2 (Jeremy Vine, Ken Bruce and Terry Wogan), presented by Jo Brand
- The X Factor (British TV series) judges Simon Cowell, Sharon Osbourne, Louis Walsh and Dannii Minogue also made a guest appearance.

=== QI ===
During the customary break for the BBC Ten O'Clock News the 9th episode of the fifth series of QI was screened on BBC Two. The episode, originally shown a week previously on BBC Four, had a Children in Need theme. It guest starred Jo Brand, Bill Bailey, Jeremy Clarkson and Pudsey Bear. Pudsey, using a new rule in the game, opted to swap himself with a member of the audience who turned out to be regular participant Alan Davies. The theme of the episode was "Entertainment".

=== Celebrity Scissorhands ===
A second series of Celebrity Scissorhands was shown in the run up to the 2007 event, this year featuring celebrity hairdresser Lee Stafford. The winner was Ninia Benjamin with Aled Haydn Jones as the runner up.

== Regional Opt-Outs ==
Every BBC English Region hosted their own event with coverage throughout the telethon. BBC Wales, BBC Scotland and BBC Northern Ireland hosted their own opt out telethons alongside the main one in London

Some of the locations hosted choirs in the link up with Lee Mead these were:

- BBC North West - Blackpool at The North Pier
- BBC Yorkshire and Lincolnshire - Lincoln at City Square
- BBC South - Basingstoke at the Milestones Museum
- BBC Northern Ireland - Belfast at The Stormont Estate - The Main Belfast event was from BBC Blackstaff House
- BBC West Midlands - Birmingham at the Centenary Square
- BBC Scotland - Glasgow at BBC Pacific Quay
- BBC Wales - Cardiff at Broadcasting House with the choir in the link up on the set of Pobol y Cwm

Locations without choirs were:

- BBC East - Newmarket at Tattersalls
- BBC East Midlands - Leicestershire at the East Midlands Airport
- BBC London - London at The London Transport Museum
- BBC North East and Cumbria - Penrith at The Rheged Centre
- BBC South East - Northfleet at Ebbsfleet International railway station
- BBC South West - Plymouth at The National Marine Aquarium
- BBC West - Bristol at St Paul's Church
- BBC Yorkshire - Sheffield at Meadowhall Shopping Centre

== Official single ==
On 5 October 2007, whilst in an interview with Scott Mills on BBC Radio 1, Melanie C announced that the new Spice Girls single would be called "Headlines (Friendship Never Ends)". On the same day, Geri Halliwell announced the news on GMTV. The single was released on 19 November 2007 in aid of the 2007 Children in Need Appeal.

Lee Mead, winner of BBC One's Any Dream Will Do search for a leading man for Andrew Lloyd Webber and Tim Rice's Joseph and the Amazing Technicolor Dreamcoat at the Adelphi Theatre in London's West End recorded Any Dream Will Do on 10 March 2007 to be released as a single to raise funds for Children in Need. It was released on 12 June 2007 for download only and entered the UK Singles Chart at No.18 on 17 June 2007. On 18 June 2007 a CD single was released – with third-placed Lewis Bradley and second-placed Keith Jack joining Mead on "Close Every Door", another song from the Lloyd Webber/Rice musical. The song had been used to mark the exit of contestants as they were voted off the show. On 24 June 2007's chart, the single – both physical and downloads – had reached No.2.

In Scotland, the popular band Runrig linked up with the Tartan Army, Scotland's football supporters organisation, to release a special version of their hit "Loch Lomond". The single is a reworking of the original, with sections sung by the Scotland football team and the Hampden Park crowd at the recent Scotland v Ukraine match. Runrig, along with members of the Tartan Army performed the single at BBC Scotland's Glasgow studios. All profits from the single are going to Children in Need. The "Loch Lomond" unofficial Children in Need single reached a higher UK chart position than the Spice Girl's Official Single , reaching number 9 compared to the Spice Girl's 11.

== Totals ==
The following are totals with the times they were announced on the televised show.

Date	Time	Total
2007-11-16	20:00 GMT	£5,175,608
2007-11-16	20:56 GMT	£8,028,267
2007-11-16	21:58 GMT	£10,928,932
2007-11-16	22:47 GMT	£12,227,725
2007-11-16	23:38 GMT	£14,827,331
2007-11-17	00:10 GMT	£16,504,463
2007-11-17	01:06 GMT	£17,785,008
2007-11-17	01:58 GMT	£19,089,771
