= Children in Need 2011 =

- Genre: Telethon
- Presented by: Terry Wogan; Alesha Dixon; Tess Daly; Fearne Cotton
- Narrated by: Alan Dedicoat
- Country of origin: United Kingdom
- Original language: English

Production
- Production location: BBC Television Centre
- Camera setup: Multiple
- Running time: 395 minutes

Original release
- Network: BBC One; BBC One HD
- Release: 18 November 2011

Related
- Children in Need 2010; Children in Need 2012

Children in Need 2011 was a campaign held in the United Kingdom to raise money for Children in Need. 2011 marked the 31st anniversary of the appeal which culminated in a live broadcast on BBC One which began on the evening of Friday 18 November and ran until the early hours of Saturday 19 November. The broadcast was hosted by Terry Wogan, with Tess Daly, Alesha Dixon and Fearne Cotton as co-hosts. The show was broadcast from BBC Television Centre in London but also included regular regional opt-outs presented from various locations around the UK.

The telecast began at 19:30 GMT and ran for six and a half hours. As usual, the broadcast featured sketches and one-off episodes of British television shows, as well as musical performances from artists including JLS, One Direction and Susan Boyle. The Collective performed their version of the Massive Attack song Teardrop, which is being released as the official Children in Need single for 2011.

The final total of money raised was revealed at 02:00 GMT as £26,332,334, with the amount expected to rise over the following days. This exceeded the money raised after the 2010 telecast by almost £7 million.

== Sketches ==
- The BBC News presenters Emily Maitlis, Sophie Raworth, Susanna Reid and Sian Williams took part in a special edition of Strictly Come Dancing together with Angela Rippon (shown twice throughout the broadcast)
- Short Doctor Who sketch, followed by a preview of the 2011 Doctor Who Christmas special, "The Doctor, the Widow and the Wardrobe".
- The children from Outnumbered covered "(Theme from) The Monkees" (shown twice throughout the broadcast)
- The EastEnders cast performed a selection of Queen songs (shown twice throughout the broadcast)
- The Muppets song "Mah Nà Mah Nà" performed by presenters of various television shows, including Chatty Man, The Million Pound Drop and BBC Breakfast and many others (shown twice throughout the broadcast)
- Dragons' Den starring Lord Alan Sugar
- Russell Howard's Good News
- Never Mind the Buzzcocks presented by Katy Brand, with guests Harry Judd & Arlene Philips (Phill Jupitus's team); and Claire Richards & Shaun Williamson (Noel Fielding's team).
- Gok Wan sang and danced to a song from the musical Chicago
- Reeves & Mortimer starred in a special sketch for Children in Need

== Musical performances ==
- One Direction - " What Makes You Beautiful" and "Gotta Be You"
- Ed Sheeran - "Lego House"
- Susan Boyle - "Enjoy the Silence"
- Olly Murs & Rizzle Kicks - "Heart Skips a Beat"
- JLS - "Do You Feel What I Feel?"
- The Saturdays - "My Heart Takes Over"
- Steps - Medley - "One for Sorrow", "Deeper Shade of Blue", "Tragedy"
- Adele - "Make You Feel My Love"
- Lady Gaga - "Born This Way","The Edge of Glory" and "Marry the Night"
- Will Young - "Come On"
- Caro Emerald - "A Night like This"
- Westlife - "You Raise Me Up"
- Matt Cardle - "Run for Your Life"
- Professor Green & Emeli Sandé - "Read All About It"
- Children in need Choir - Keep Holding On

== Theatre performances ==
- The Cast of West End production The Wizard of Oz - medley including "Over the Rainbow", "Follow the Yellow Brick Road" and "We're Off to See the Wizard"
- BBC Children in Need Choir, conducted by Gareth Malone, star of the television series The Choir, and featuring numerous children around the country performing "Keep Holding On" simultaneously
- The Cast of musical Rock of Ages performed with Shayne Ward and Justin Lee Collins
- The Cast of West End production Crazy for You

== Official single ==
"Teardrop" by Tulisa, Wretch 32, Ed Sheeran, Ms. Dynamite, Chipmunk, Mz Bratt, Dot Rotten, Labrinth, Rizzle Kicks and Tinchy Stryder - also known as The Collective.

== Locations ==
The primary event was held at BBC Television Centre in London, with the main telethon and the preceding One Show special being located within the studios and outside respectively. In addition to this, each BBC Nation and Region also held individual broadcasts. These celebrations typically lasted until approximately 22.00 and featured their own schedule, however would have events similar to the main telethon. These regional events were televised in opt out segments of the main telethon in which the region provided some entertainment and update on fundraising in the region. Each region also provided a choir of about 200 children who sang live in Gareth Malone's Children in need choir. Each region and choir was based at the following locations:

- BBC Scotland - BBC Pacific Quay, Glasgow
- BBC Cymru Wales - Royal Welsh College of Music & Drama, Cardiff
- BBC Northern Ireland - W5 museum, Belfast
- BBC London - Hyde Park, London
- BBC East - Charter Hall, Colchester
- BBC East Midlands - Loughborough University, Loughborough
- BBC Midlands - Aston Hall, Birmingham
- BBC North East and Cumbria - Beamish Museum, County Durham
- BBC North West - MediaCityUK, Salford
- BBC South - The National Motor Museum, Hampshire
- BBC South East - Bluewater, Kent
- BBC South West - Eden Project, Cornwall
- BBC West - Grand Pier, Weston-super-Mare
- BBC Yorkshire - Pudsey Market Square, Pudsey
- BBC Yorkshire and Lincolnshire - Hull Truck Theatre, Hull

These local events were hosted by members of the regional news service, usually either one of the main programme anchors, or other members of the team including sports and weather presenters.

== Other fundraising ==
=== BBC internal ===
- As in previous years, the television programme Countryfile sold a calendar that raised over £1 million.
- A special edition of The One Show directly preceded the telethon, in which presenter Matt Baker returned from his 500-mile rickshaw challenge in which he cycled from Edinburgh to BBC Television Centre, London. He arrived midway through the programme and described his journey. Through donations given to him personally and through text donations throughout the weeks One Show programmes, he raised over £1.2 million.
- A special version of the television programme DIY SOS: The Big Build saw the team, along with the local community, renovate a dilapidated youth centre in Norris Green, Liverpool. The programme raised a large amount of money through text donations during the programme.
- A special Children in Need edition of Mastermind was broadcast on 11 November 2011, a week before the telethon, featuring comedians Russell Kane, Jared Christmas, Imran Yusuf and Karen Taylor.
- The listeners of BBC Radio 2 raised over £2 million through a variety of fundraising events including the Auction for things money can't buy, in which listeners bid for experiences such as to be part of an air tattoo or a makeover by Gok Wan among other things, their Children in Need Jukebox, in which members of the public are able to choose which songs they want to hear in exchange for a donation, and through the individual acts of the presenters and DJ's themselves.

=== Partner events ===
Build-a-Bear Workshop
Pudsey and Blush bears
ASDA
Men's T-shirt
Ladies' T-shirt
Kids' T-shirt
Umbrellas
Baking goods
Shortbread Cutter
Cake stand
Greggs
Spotty Cupcake
Spotty jam doughnut.

== Children in Need Rocks Manchester ==
Take That singer and The X Factor judge Gary Barlow organised a free charity music concert, Children in Need Rocks Manchester. It was broadcast on 17 November 2011 on BBC One, BBC One HD and simulcast on BBC Radio 1 and was hosted by Fearne Cotton, Chris Moyles and David Tennant. Performers included Lady Gaga, JLS, Hugh Laurie, Jessie J, Coldplay, Snow Patrol and The Collective. The concert raised over £2,500,000 including from text donations during the programme.

== Totals ==
The following are totals with the times they were announced on the televised show.

Date	Time	Total
18 November 2011	20:03 GMT	£4,364,411
18 November 2011	21:04 GMT	£8,911,090
18 November 2011	21:59 GMT	£15,274,911
18 November 2011	23:09 GMT	£19,555,068
19 November 2011	00:03 GMT	£22,207,844
19 November 2011	01:04 GMT	£24,255,334
19 November 2011	02:00 GMT	£26,332,334

== Reception ==
The reception from television critics about the telecast was mixed. Michael Deacon, writing for the Telegraph, said "It's a great cause. The only thing that matters is the amount of money raised for the young and needy. That's what you keep reminding yourself as you sit through hour after hour of televisual chaff." He went on to put "Is there a man, woman or child in the country...who wouldn’t donate good money in return for a guarantee that they wouldn’t have to watch any of the above ever again?" He called the cause "wonderful" but ended his review by writing "advice for the viewer...donate as large a sum as you can early on, and then feel guilt-free about switching off your TV."

== See also ==
- Children in Need
- Pudsey Bear
