= Children in Need 2004 =

- Genre: Telethon
- Presented by: Terry Wogan; Gaby Roslin
- Voices of: Alan Dedicoat
- Country of origin: United Kingdom

Production
- Production locations: BBC Television Centre; RAF Brize Norton
- Camera setup: Multiple

Original release
- Network: BBC One, BBC Two
- Release: 19 November – 20 November 2004

Related
- Children in Need 2003; Children in Need 2005

Children in Need 2004 was a campaign held in the United Kingdom to raise money for the charity Children in Need. It culminated in a live broadcast on BBC One on the evening of Friday 19 November and was hosted primarily by Terry Wogan, who was assisted by Gaby Roslin. The voice over was Alan Dedicoat.

== Television campaign ==
=== Artist performances ===
- Girls Aloud
- Blue
- Bryan Adams
- Geri Halliwell
- Kylie Minogue
- Shania Twain
- Travis
- Jamie Cullum
- Daniel Bedingfield
- Snow Patrol
- Paul Weller
- Katie Melua
- McFly
- Natasha Bedingfield
- Rolf Harris
- Amanda Holden
- Westlife

=== Cast performances ===
- BBC Newsreaders pretending to be Duran Duran and Bananarama
- Members of the Mary Poppins stage musical.
- The cast of Coronation Street perform their version of the musical Oliver!.
- The cast of Bad Girls perform their version of musical Chicago's "Cell Block Tango"
- Cast of Mamma Mia

=== Others ===
- Magician Scott Penrose performed an "all star" magic act, aided by a number of celebrity assistants. Actress Debra Stephenson was levitated and made to disappear, Katie Melua was divided into three in the Zig Zag Girl, Amanda Holden was beheaded by a guillotine, and singer Shania Twain was sawed in half in an illusion called Clearly Impossible.

=== Regional Concerts ===
There were 5 concerts held on the night that the main telethon would opt into.

These were at

- Carlisle - The Car Park on Devonshire Walk outside Carlisle Castle
- Gloucester - The Car Park outside Blackfriars
- Hull - West Park
- Stirling - Stirling Castle
- Wrexham - Llwyn Isaf

== Official single ==
The official single for 2004's appeal was recorded by Girls Aloud. The band recorded a cover of The Pretenders' 1994 song I'll Stand By You for the charity. The single reached number one on the UK Singles Chart for two weeks.
