= Intelligent Giving =

The Intelligent Giving logo

Intelligent Giving was a small charity based in London whose core output was a website designed to help donors choose between charities. In September 2009 the charity wound down. The website was discontinued soon after.

== Overview ==
Intelligent Giving aimed to raise public interest in charitable giving and advised donors how to make the most satisfactory use of their money. It was one of several organisations, including New Philanthropy Capital (UK) and Charity Navigator (US), that formed for this purpose, and it operated in a relatively new sector in the not-for-profit arena. It sought to bring its findings to as wide a readership as possible, employing a casual, witty approach on its website. The authors aligned themselves with donors, not with the charity fundraising community. The organisation was a company limited by guarantee and itself gained charitable status in 2008.

== Services and work ==
The central feature of Intelligent Giving's website was a charity ratings service. In 2005–06, it researched and rated over 500 UK charities and listed a further 1,000. Although it clearly acknowledged that quality of work is the most important way to judge a charity, it held transparency as an important indicator of a charity’s diligence, and said that this was the most important aspect—and a cross-sector comparable one—of a charity's annual report.

== Media coverage ==
In March 2007, Intelligent Giving claimed that English Premiership football clubs were not giving enough to charity. Chelsea FC was particularly criticized in this work, and a man calling himself "Dave from Chelsea" left a telephone message "I'm going to punch you in the face" for Intelligent Giving's lead researcher in response to media reports.

In June 2007, the organisation analysed the Jewish charities it had profiled and concluded, "They are pretty appalling in terms of transparency." Details from the report were published in The Jewish Chronicle.

In July 2007, Intelligent Giving won the New Statesman New Media Award for Information & Openness.

October 2007 saw Intelligent Giving name and shame in The Guardian the rugby union charity Wooden Spoon Society for providing a very low return on its fundraising activities. Intelligent Giving's argument was rejected by John Inverdale, a BBC broadcaster, in an opinion piece in The Daily Telegraph as "misguided reporting that fails to understand how fund-raising operates." It was also condemned by Wooden Spoon in a statement. The Charity Commission's judgement subsequently attracted attention in The Sunday Telegraph, where it was given as an example of the Charity Commission's poor decision-making process.

== Voluntary sector response ==
Critics included Steve Taylor of Sue Ryder Care, who decried the organisation as a "self appointed guardian" with "little demonstrable understanding of the operating framework" of charities; the Institute of Fundraising, which called its research methods "rudimentary"; and Sir Terry Wogan (a trustee of Children in Need) who condemned its work as "contemptible".

Intelligent Giving said that its approach was significantly more nuanced than that of other charity-profiling services, such as Charity Navigator in the US.

== See also ==
- GuideStar: UK and US databases and information on charities
- GiveWell: An American non-profit charity evaluator, focused on identifying outstanding charities that are proven, cost-effective, scalable, and transparent.
