= Children in Need Rocks the Royal Albert Hall =

2009 UK charity concert

- Genre: Music concert
- Presented by: Chris Moyles; Fearne Cotton; Sir Terry Wogan
- Country of origin: United Kingdom
- Original language: English

Production
- Production locations: Royal Albert Hall, London, England
- Camera setup: Multiple
- Running time: 120 minutes

Original release
- Network: BBC One; BBC HD
- Release: 19 November 2009

Related
- Children in Need Rocks Manchester

Children in Need Rocks the Royal Albert Hall
- Genre: Music concert
- Dates: 12 November 2009
- Locations: Royal Albert Hall, London, England
- Years active: 2009
- Founders: Gary Barlow
- Website: Official Site

Children in Need Rocks the Royal Albert Hall was a charity music concert held at the Royal Albert Hall in London, England on 12 November 2009. The concert was organised by Take That singer-songwriter Gary Barlow as one of a series of events to raise money for Children in Need 2009. The huge success of the concert inspired Barlow to organise Children in Need Rocks Manchester at the Manchester Evening News Arena, Manchester in 2011.

== Background ==
The concert was broadcast on BBC One and BBC HD on 19 November 2009, the day before the official appeal telethon. Short films of projects being funded by the charity were shown at various points throughout the show, often featuring one of the celebrities meeting a child or group of children.

The event was hosted by BBC Radio 1 presenters Chris Moyles and Fearne Cotton along with Sir Terry Wogan, who had been involved with Children in Need since 1980. The acts performing on the night included Barlow's band Take That, Muse, Mika, and Girls Aloud member Cheryl Cole. The house band was led by Mike Stevens and Steve Sidwell, however Paul McCartney brought his own band to the concert.

Tickets for the concert were sold from £50.

== Performances ==
- Take That – "Greatest Day",
- Robbie Williams – "Bodies" and "You Know Me"
- Muse – "United States of Eurasia"
- Leona Lewis – "Happy" and "Run"
- Paolo Nutini – "Pencil Full of Lead"
- Katherine Jenkins – "Parla Più Piano" (The Godfather theme) (with Julian Lloyd Webber on cello)
- Cheryl Cole – "Fight for This Love"
- Mika – "Rain"
- Annie Lennox – "Why"
- Shirley Bassey – "This Time" (with Gary Barlow on piano) and "Diamonds Are Forever" (with Dizzee Rascal)
- Snow Patrol – "Chasing Cars" and "Set the Fire to the Third Bar" (with Cheryl Cole)
- Dizzee Rascal and Shingai Shoniwa – "Dirtee Cash"
- Lily Allen – "The Fear" and "Who'd Have Known"/"Shine" (with Take That)
- Take That – "Rule the World"
- Paul McCartney – "Back in the USSR", "Get Back" and "Hey Jude" (with Take That and others)

== See also ==
- Children in Need 2009
