= Children in Need Rocks Manchester =

2011 UK charity concert

- Genre: Music concert
- Presented by: Chris Moyles; Fearne Cotton; David Tennant
- Country of origin: United Kingdom
- Original language: English

Production
- Production locations: Manchester Evening News Arena, Manchester, England
- Camera setup: Multiple
- Running time: 122 minutes

Original release
- Network: BBC One; BBC One HD; BBC Radio 1; BBC Radio Manchester
- Release: 17 November 2011

Related
- Children in Need Rocks the Royal Albert Hall; Children in Need Rocks 2013

Children in Need Rocks Manchester
- Genre: Music concert
- Dates: 17 November 2011
- Locations: Manchester Evening News Arena, Manchester, England
- Years active: 2011
- Founders: Gary Barlow
- Website: Official Site

Children in Need Rocks Manchester was a charity music concert held at the Manchester Evening News Arena in Manchester, England, on 17 November 2011. The concert was organised by Take That singer-songwriter Gary Barlow as one of a series of events to raise money for Children in Need 2011. It became the second Children in Need Rocks concert organised by Barlow, after the Children in Need Rocks the Royal Albert Hall in 2009.

== Background ==
The concert was broadcast on BBC One, BBC One HD, BBC Radio 1 and BBC Radio Manchester on Thursday 17 November 2011, the day before the official appeal telethon. Short films of projects being funded by the charity were shown at various points throughout the show, often featuring one of the celebrities meeting a child or group of children.

The event was hosted by BBC Radio 1 presenters Chris Moyles and Fearne Cotton, along with former Doctor Who actor David Tennant. The acts performing at the concert included Canadian Michael Bublé, Jessie J, Coldplay, James Morrison, Barlow's fellow The X Factor judges, Tulisa Contostavlos and Kelly Rowland, Barlow himself and Lady Gaga. The house band was led by Mike Stevens and Steve Sidwell. Barlow revealed on The Chris Moyles Show when announcing the concert that he had personally contacted the acts he wanted to perform.

Tickets for the concert cost between £55 and £95, and the 12,000 tickets sold out within 10 minutes of going on sale on 16 September 2011. Some tickets were also bought by radio stations and television programmes to be auctioned, with one pair of tickets being sold to a BBC Radio Jersey listener for £2010. The concert raised over £2,500,000 including from text donations during the programme. The total would be added to the £26 million which was donated by the British public during the telethon the next day.

== Performances ==
- The Collective with Tulisa Contostavlos – "Teardrop"
- Lady Gaga – "Born This Way" "The Edge of Glory and "Marry The Night"
- Ed Sheeran – "The A Team"
- Michael Bublé – "Haven't Met You Yet" and "Santa Claus Is Coming To Town"
- Dappy and Fazer – "No Regrets"
- Snow Patrol – "This Isn't Everything You Are"
- Kelly Rowland – "Down for Whatever"
- James Morrison – "You Give Me Something" and "Up" (featuring Jessie J)
- Hugh Laurie – "Crazy Arms" and "Hallelujah I Love Her So" (featuring Jamie Cullum)
- Andrea Bocelli – "Nessun Dorma"
- Elbow – "Open Arms" and "One Day Like This"
- JLS – "Take a Chance on Me" and "She Makes Me Wanna"
- Jessie J – "Nobody's Perfect"
- Gary Barlow – "Back for Good"
- Coldplay – "Every Teardrop Is A Waterfall", "Paradise" and "Viva la Vida"

== See also ==
- Children in Need 2011
- Manchester Evening News Arena
