= BBC Elstree Centre =

TV studios in Hertfordshire, England

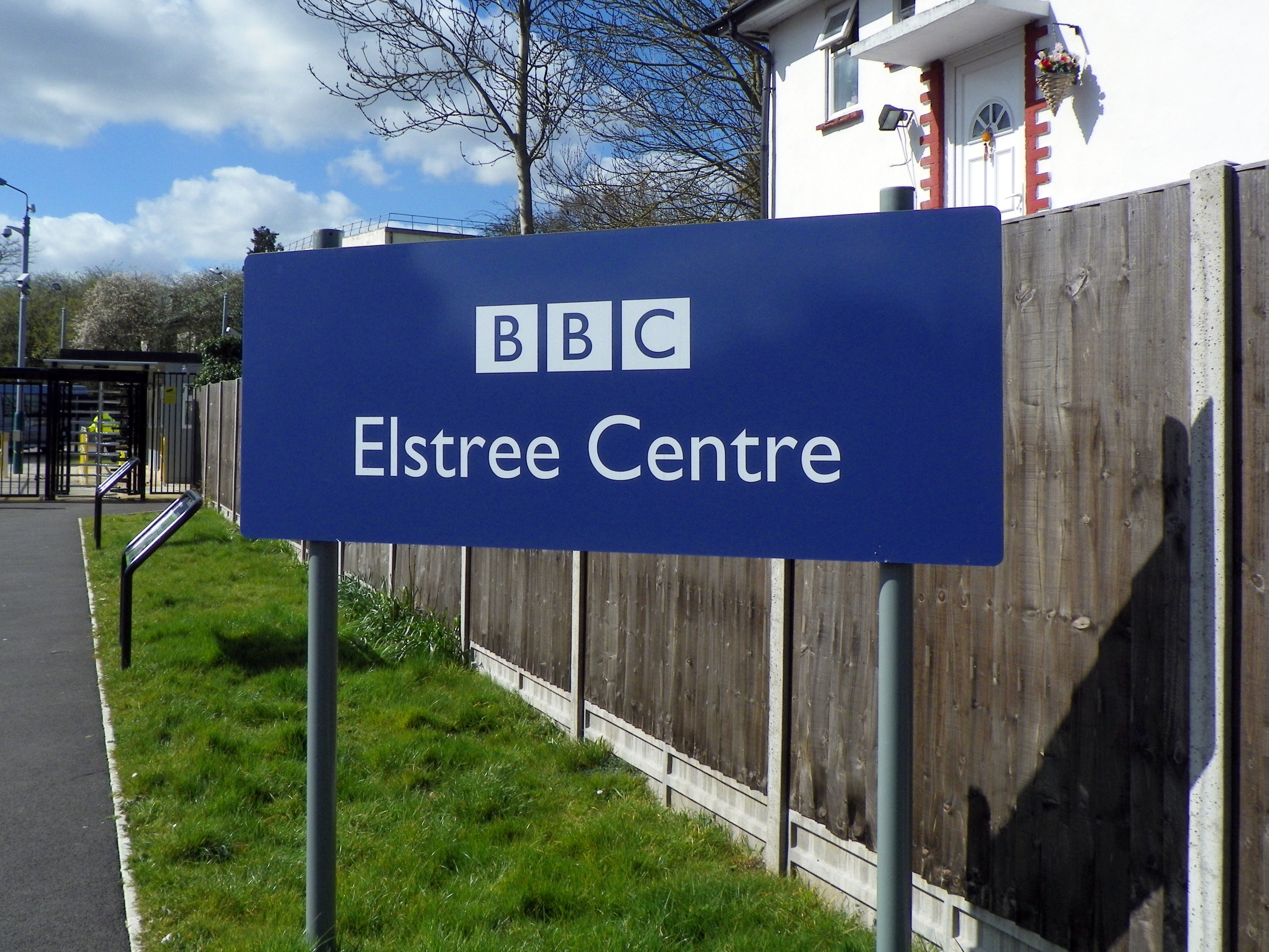
- Entrance to complex off Eldon Avenue
- Interactive map of the BBC Elstree Centre area
- Former names: Neptune Film Studios; Blattner Studios; Rock Studios; British National Studios; National Studios (a.k.a. Fairbanks); ATV Elstree Studios
- Alternative names: Eldon Avenue Studios; Clarendon Road Studios
- Etymology: named after Elstree parish

General information
- Type: Television production
- Location: Between Eldon Avenue and Clarendon Road in Borehamwood, Eldon Avenue, England
- Coordinates: 51°39′35″N 0°16′29″W
- Current tenants: BBC Studioworks
- Inaugurated: 1914
- Owner: Neptune Film Company (1914–1917); Ideal Film Company (1917–1924); Ludwig Blattner (1928–1936); Joe Rock Productions (1936–1939); British National Films Company (1939–1948); Douglas Fairbanks Junior (1953–1958); ATV (1958–1981); Central Television (1982–1983); BBC (1984–present)

Website
- www.BBCStudioworks.com

The BBC Elstree Centre, sometimes referred to as the BBC Elstree Studios, is a television production facility, currently owned by AXA. The complex is located between Eldon Avenue and Clarendon Road in Borehamwood, Hertfordshire, England.

This site was the first of several such complexes colloquially referred to as Elstree Studios located in the area. Originally created as a film studio in 1914, the site was converted for use as a television studio in 1960, becoming the main television production site for Lew Grade's ATV franchise for the ITV network. After ATV became Central Television in the early 1980s and moved to a new Midlands-based complex, this site was sold to the BBC in 1984. It is currently a main production base for BBC Television, with the television studios being run by the BBC's commercial subsidiary BBC Studioworks, previously known as BBC Studios and Post Production.

The BBC Elstree Centre site includes the external set for the long-running soap opera EastEnders and, until December 2021, the medical drama Holby City. With the sale and partial demolition of BBC Television Centre in West London, BBC Television's original head office and primary TV production site, Studio D at Elstree has since been utilised for many of the BBC's large studio productions; such as Children in Need, Comic Relief and the BBC's 2015 General Election coverage.

During the 2010s, BBC Studioworks began operating three additional sound stages, newly equipped for television, at the nearby Elstree Studios in Shenley Road.

== History ==
=== Film studio ===
The Neptune Film Company opened the first studios in Borehamwood in 1914. It contained just a single 70 feet (21 metres) window-less stage (the first 'dark stage' in England), relying on electricity from a gas-powered generator for lighting. At the time, this was an innovation, as the majority of early films were shot in large glass-roof studios which relied on natural light. It was said that Borehamwood was chosen as it had a good London train service, but was far enough away to avoid the then-regular London pea soup fogs. At the time, Borehamwood was a small hamlet in the parish of Elstree, named after the larger village of Elstree, as was the railway station of Elstree, and so the studio's location was often referred to as "Elstree", rather than "Borehamwood". Production at Neptune Studios ceased during 1917, and the studios were sold to the Ideal Film Company, who used the site up until 1924.

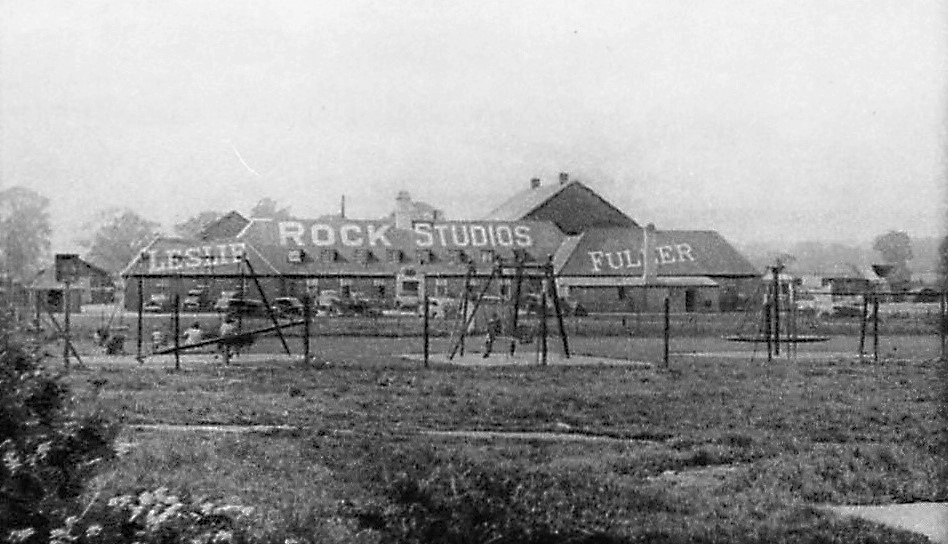
Rock Studios, about 1936

During 1928, the studios were sold to Ludwig Blattner, who connected them to the electricity mains and introduced a German system of sound recording. The Blattner Studios were leased to Joe Rock Productions during 1934, and two years later it purchased the site, renaming it "Rock Studios". Rock Productions built four new large stages, and began making films, including the drama film The Edge of the World (1937), directed by Michael Powell.

The studios were owned by British National Films Company between 1939 and 1948, although during this period a large portion of the studio was taken over by the British government for war work.

During 1953, the studios were bought by Douglas Fairbanks Junior, mainly for television production, who renamed them "National Studios", although they were informally known as "Fairbanks Studios". Early productions included the Douglas Fairbanks Presents series (1953–1957), and a few episodes of Alfred Hitchcock Presents.

=== ATV ===
The studios were sold to Lew Grade's Associated Television (ATV) in May 1958. The original intention of the new owners was to use the facility for production of the affiliated ITC filmed series. The Adventures of William Tell (1958–59) was produced here, but ATV's existing television studios were insufficient for its requirements. A 7.5 acres (3.0 hectares) site on London's South Bank had been purchased, but completion of a wholly new complex would be some years in the future, while the need for more studio space was urgent. As a result, the Eldon Avenue centre was re-equipped as an electronic television complex, and most of ATV's live and video-taped shows were made there. The series made by the affiliated ITC, such as The Saint, Gideon's Way, and The Prisoner, were shot on 35mm film at other companies' neighbouring Elstree facilities or elsewhere, mostly at the ABPC Elstree (Film) Studios, and MGM-British Studios.

Originally, some ATV programmes were made at the Alpha studios in Aston, Birmingham. This was because ATV had the weekday ITV Midland franchise as well as the weekend London franchise until network changes in 1968. After 1970, programmes such as Crossroads were made at the new Birmingham studios at the ATV Centre. Larger-scale productions, including many drama programmes, continued to be recorded at the Elstree facility for the rest of ATV's existence. In the period of its occupation of the Elstree complex, the smaller Studios A and B were used for schools TV and sitcoms, while Studio C was a drama studio. Studio D, with permanent audience seating, was used for light entertainment programmes such as the ATV Morecambe and Wise series (Two of a Kind, 1961–68) and The Muppet Show (1976–81).

ATV was restructured as Central Independent Television for the new contractual period beginning in January 1982. One of the conditions of its licence renewal by the governing body of the ITV network, then the Independent Broadcasting Authority (IBA), was that ATV should vacate any London-based facilities and become entirely focused on the English Midlands, the region of the United Kingdom for which it had held the ITV franchise since 1968. For the last 18 months of its use as an ITV production studio, the complex was under the ownership of Central Independent Television; as ATV ceased to exist as a company at the end of 31 December 1981. The studios remained in operation by Central TV up until July 1983 (the final production under Central ownership being a Max Bygraves-era episode of Family Fortunes), when its new East Midlands Television Centre in Nottingham was completed.

=== BBC Elstree Centre ===
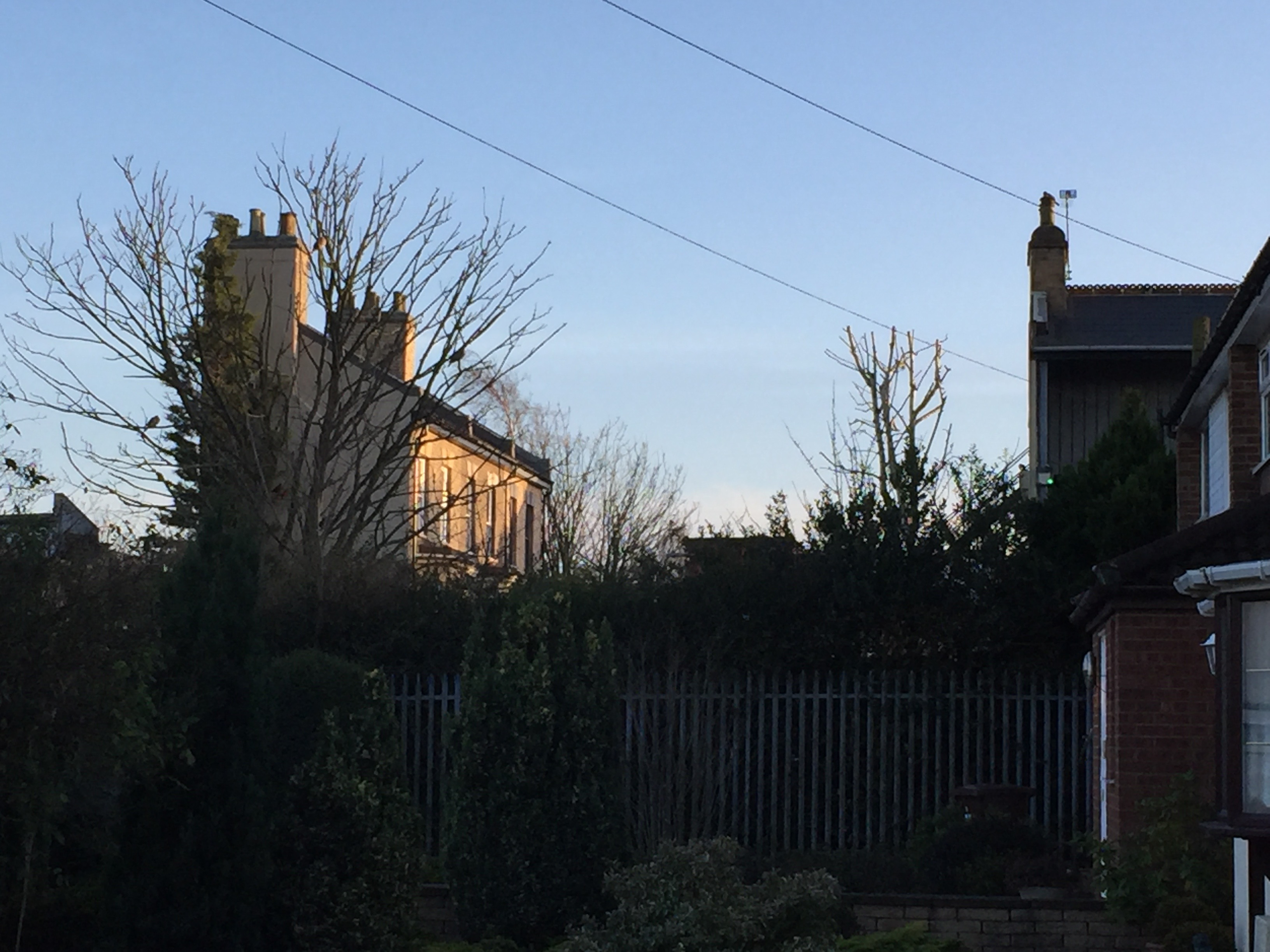
Back of Albert Square, external part of the set of EastEnders.

EMI 2001s on their last day in BBC Elstree Studio C in July 1991. The last programme in the world to use EMI 2001s to record images was EastEnders.

When the BBC bought the Elstree site in 1984 to produce its new soap opera EastEnders (first aired on 19 February 1985), it did not purchase the equipment within the building. Some sources state that, as a consequence, Central TV's studio technicians were instructed to make the equipment left behind inoperable (there are particular claims about the camera prisms being smashed). Other sources dispute this, claiming the equipment was already so old and worthless there would have been no gain in intentionally disabling it. When the BBC moved in, it repaired equipment that was not beyond repair, sometimes using spare parts from identical pieces of equipment already in BBC use. The EMI 2001 television cameras used in Studio 3 at BBC Television Centre, Shepherd's Bush, were moved into the newly renamed 'BBC Elstree Centre' as part of that studio's refurbishment, instead of being stripped down for spare parts. Central TV's own EMI 2001s were considered to be beyond economic repair by BBC staff sent to examine the site, regardless of whether they had been intentionally disabled or not by Central TV employees. Elstree kept the EMI 2001s until 1991. Elstree's first new cameras were to be Thomson TTV-1531s, one of the last plumbicon-tubed cameras to be made. These cameras were again replaced in the mid-1990s with Thomson TTV-1542 and TTV-1647 lightweight cameras using the then-new camera technology of a charge-coupled device (CCD). Widescreen was introduced in 1999, using Philips/Thomson LDK 100s. In 2010, the cameras across the site were again upgraded, this time to Sony HSC-300s.

In August 2022, it was reported that the BBC was considering selling the studios and leasing them back for production.

By 2024, BBC Studioworks had completed a deal with AXA and Oxygen Studios where a large part of the BBC Elstree site was sold for redevelopment. Eastenders will remain in a now reduced BBC Elstree site as part of a deal made, where Eastenders can reside there for 25 years. EastEnders left their Studio C in July 2024 and the large audience based Studio D closed in December 2024. The election 'hub' in the old galleries of studio C has been moved to BBC New Broadcasting House in central London. BBC Studioworks have now taken over control Stages 5 and 6 at Elstree Film and TV Studios, with these stages now being used by Eastenders, as a replacement for Studio C. BBC Studioworks have also taken over control of George Lucas Stage 1 at Elstree Film and TV Studios, which will now be used as a replacement for Studio D.

== Buildings ==
Fairbanks With its distinctive green-tiled roof, this is the oldest surviving building on the site, part of the studios constructed during the 1930s. It sits adjacent to the largest studios, Studio C and D.

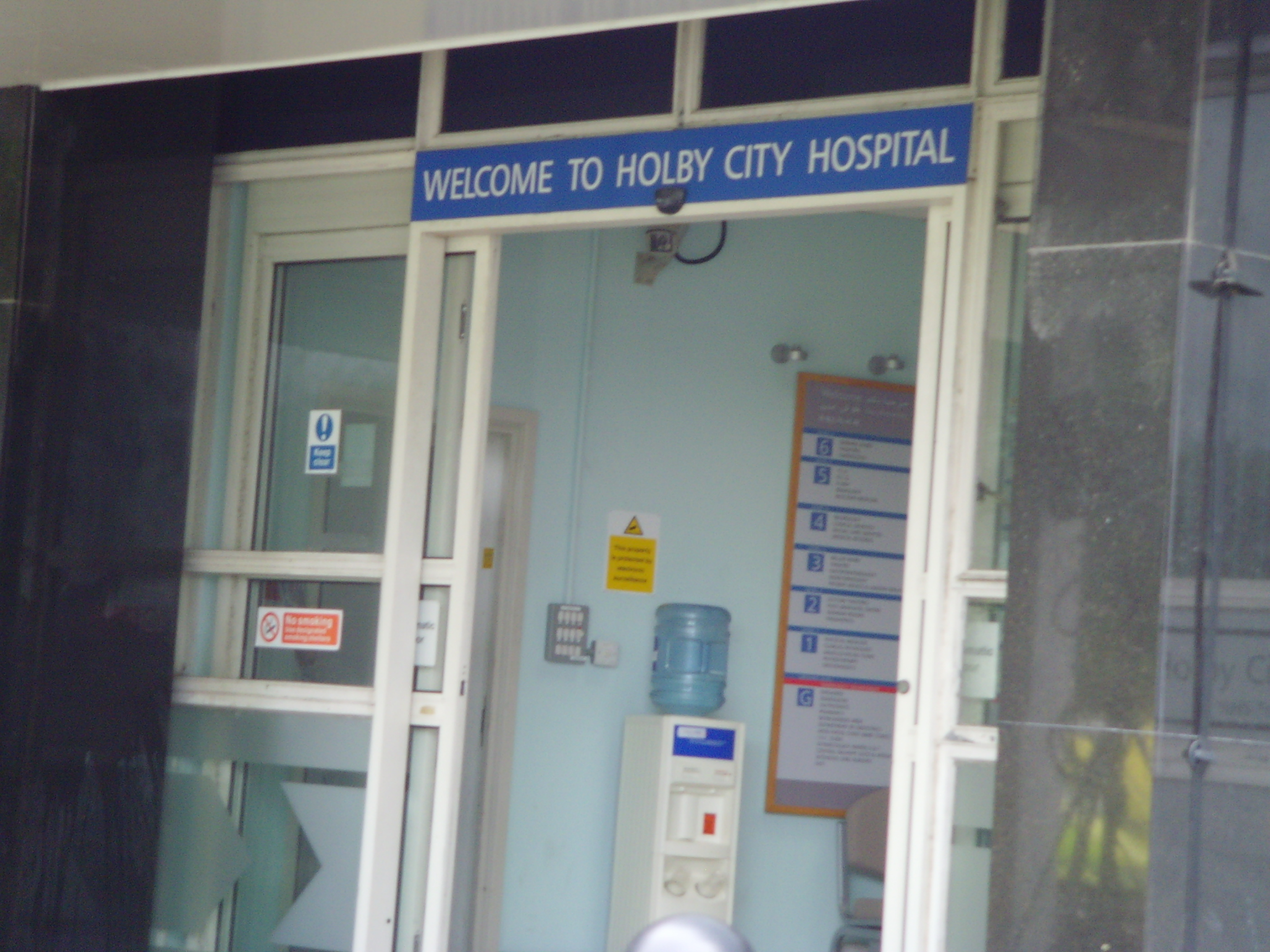
Holby City Hospital reception entrance, as used on the fictional medical drama Holby City, filmed at Elstree.

Neptune House was built during the 1960s, and has a glass-fronted entrance. It has featured in several popular television series, including as the school in Grange Hill from 1985 to 1989, and since 1999, as the hospital reception for Holby City. A purpose-built set was constructed for Grange Hill at the back of the building in 1989, but was dismantled when the series left Elstree in 2002. Neptune House can be seen in the opening titles of Gerry Anderson's science-fiction series UFO (1970) as Harlington-Straker Film Studios, the (literal) cover for the secret and below-ground headquarters of SHADO. The hospital 'wards' in Holby City are actually the top floor of Neptune House, fully kitted out, allowing genuine outside views from the windows. The building's staircases are seen almost constantly in the series.

=== Backlot ===
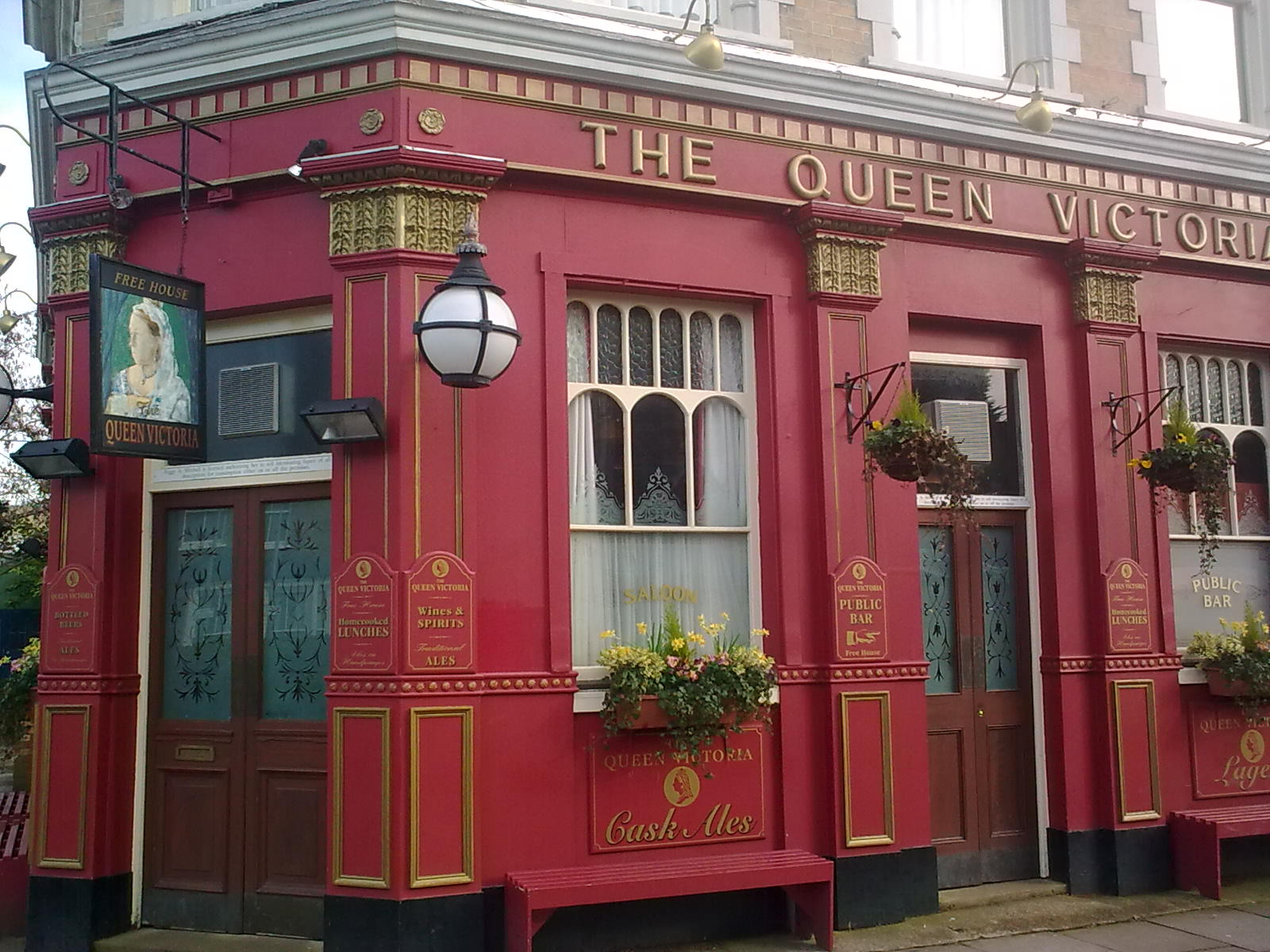
Exteriors and interiors of the Queen Vic are filmed on site

The exterior set for the fictional East London setting Albert Square in EastEnders is located in the permanent backlot at 51°39′32″N 0°16′40″W. Originally constructed in 1984, the set is outdoors and open to the elements; by 2010, it was looking increasingly shabby. It was rebuilt for compliance with the requirements of high-definition television on the same site in 2013–2014, using mostly real brick, with some areas using a new improved plastic brick. Throughout rebuilding filming still took place, and so scaffolding was often seen on screen during the process, with some story lines written to accommodate the rebuilding, such as the Queen Vic fire.

In January 2014, the BBC announced on the EastEnders website that the set has been approved to be expanded by twenty per cent; creating a new permanent front lot, located on the site of the former staff car park. This expansion project is the 'E20' project, which by 2018 had already gone over-budget. Filming on the front lot commenced in January 2022.

=== Studios ===
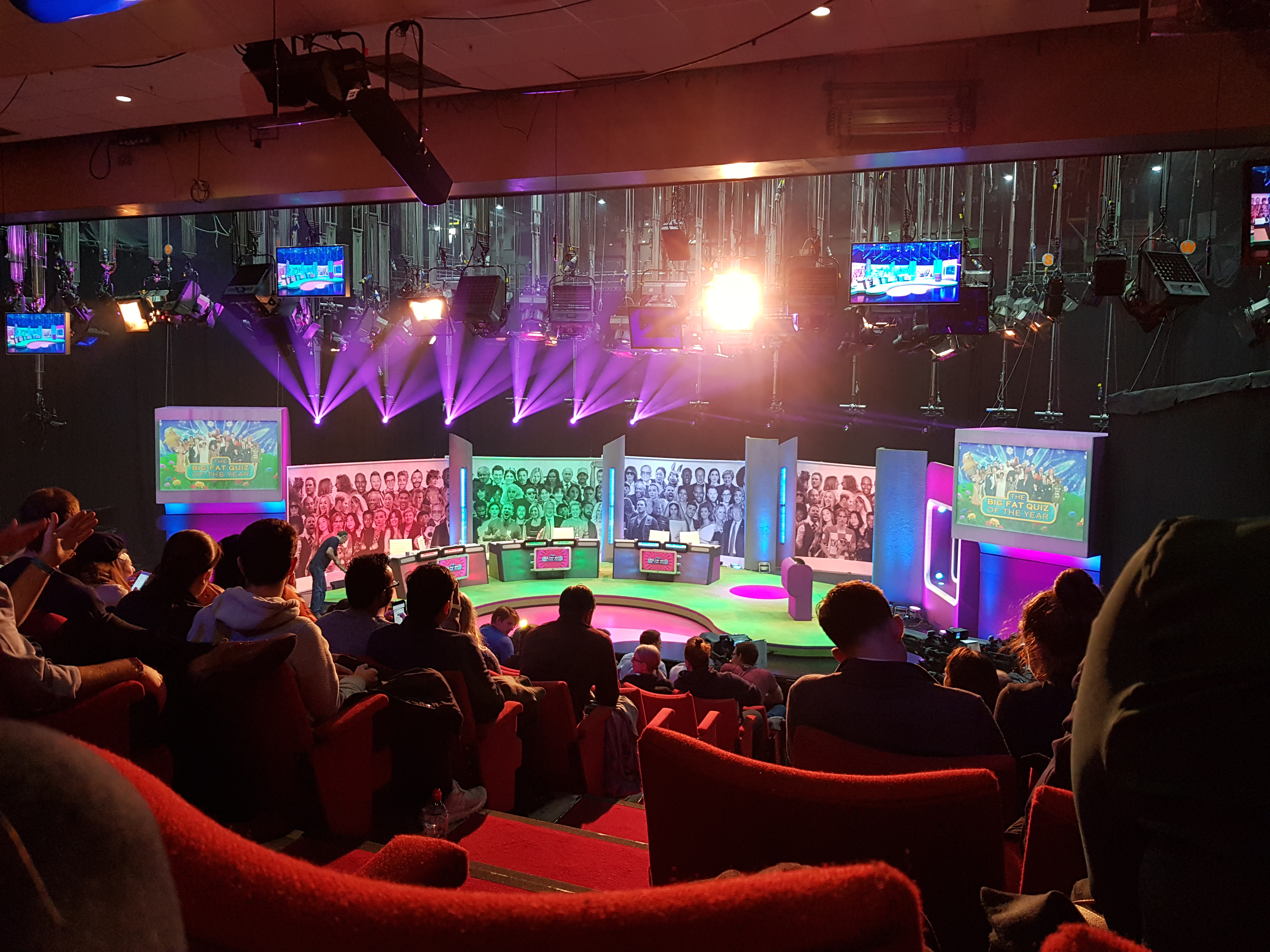
The Big Fat Quiz of the Year set in Studio D

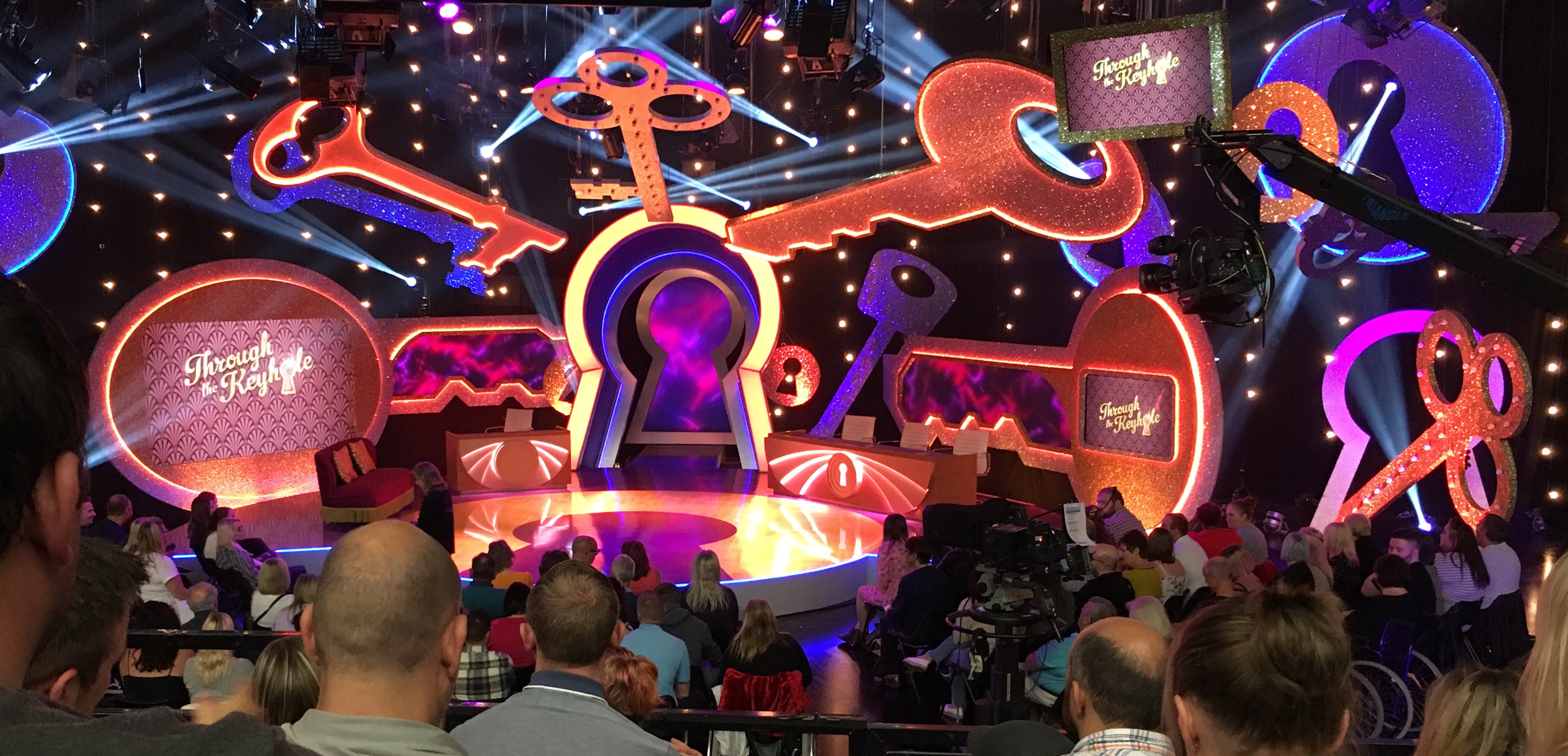
Through the Keyhole set in Studio D

Of the seven large studios on site, all are operated by BBC Studioworks. However, only one (Studio D) is available for hire, the other six being permanently dedicated to EastEnders. There are also a number of smaller studios used for the filming of Holby City. The current configuration is as follows:

==== Studio A ====
66 × 62 metric feet within fire lanes.

Part of the EastEnders studio facilities. It has an overhang in one corner with production galleries above, but these areas are no longer used.

==== Studio B ====
70 × 62 metric feet within fire lanes.

Part of the EastEnders studio facilities. Like A, C and D, it has an overhang in one corner with production galleries above. The original gallery facilities have been modified into two separate production galleries for use on EastEnders, and both can control any of the studios on site (other than Studio D) plus the backlot.

==== Studio C ====
102 × 68 metric ft within fire lanes.

Formerly part of the EastEnders studio facilities. Like A, B and D, it has an overhang in one corner with production galleries above. The original gallery facilities were converted into a switching and engineering area for BBC News' election broadcasts. Studio C closed down in July 2024 and was sold to AXA and Oxygen Studios as part of a sale deal with BBC Studioworks.

==== Studio D ====
114 × 78 metric feet, excluding audience seating.

Up until December 2024 this was the only studio at BBC Elstree available for hire to television productions. The studio closed down in December 2024 as part of the sale agreement to AXA and Oxygen Studios as part of their redevelopment of the site. This was a 8,892 sq ft (826.1 m^{2}) light-entertainment studio with permanent audience seating in a recessed area of one wall. Like A, B and C, it has an overhang in one corner with production galleries above.

==== Studio E ====
Adjacent to Studio D, Studio E, which is 1,134 square feet (105.4 square metres), is used as props handling.

==== Stage 1 ====
154 × 60 metric feet outside fire lanes.

Part of the EastEnders studio facilities. It includes a number of control rooms and associated facilities along one wall, which can control the backlot plus any of the studios on site (other than Studio D). This is the home of the standing sets of The Queen Victoria and the cafe.

==== Stage 2 ====
Part of the EastEnders studio facilities. Located in the same complex as Stage 1 and 3.

==== Stage 3 ====
Part of the EastEnders studio facilities. Located in the same complex as Stage 1 and 2.

== See also ==
- Category:Films shot at Rock Studios (1928–1939)
- Category:Films shot at British National Studios (1939–1958)
- Category:Television shows shot at British National Studios (before 1958)
- Category:Television shows shot at ATV Elstree Studios (1958–1983)
- Category:Television shows shot at BBC Elstree Centre (since 1984)
