= Alan Dedicoat =

English TV announcer

- Born: 1954 (age 71–72); Hollywood, Worcestershire, United Kingdom
- Occupations: Announcer, newsreader
- Years active: 1979–present
- Employer: BBC

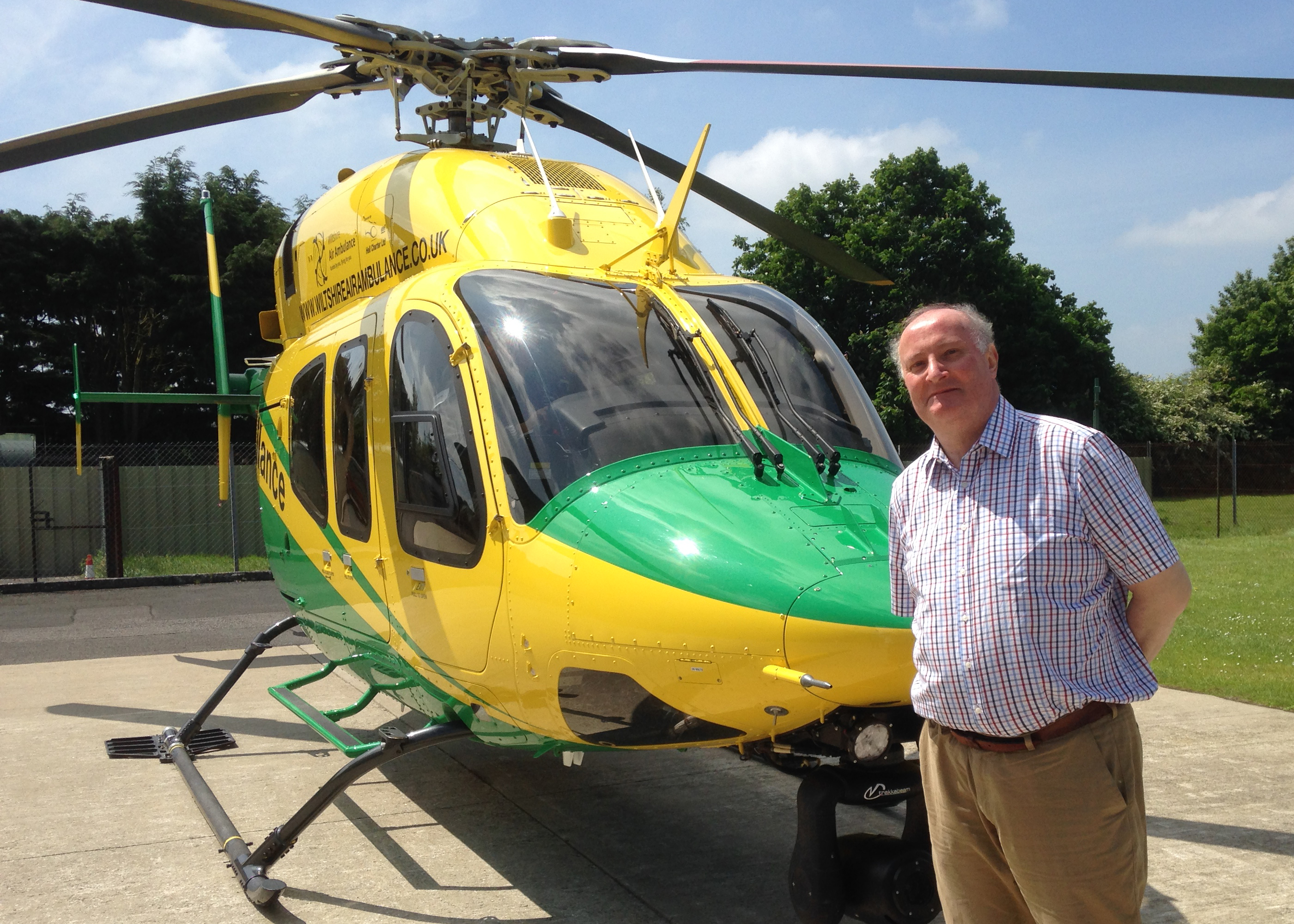
Dedicoat and Wiltshire Air Ambulance in 2016

Alan Dedicoat (born December 1954) is a British announcer from Hollywood, England, for programmes on BBC One. He is known as the "Voice of the Balls" on the National Lottery programmes, providing a voiceover for the draws since 1995. He was a BBC Radio 2 newsreader until his retirement from this role in March 2015. Since their inceptions in May 2004 and June 2005 respectively, Dedicoat has been the announcer on the BBC One reality TV competition Strictly Come Dancing and its American version Dancing with the Stars.

== Early life ==
Dedicoat was born in Hollywood in Worcestershire. The son of a newsagent, Dedicoat was educated at King Edward VI Camp Hill School for Boys in Birmingham, and the University of Birmingham. Dedicoat worked in the Civil Service as an executive officer before joining the BBC.

== Career ==
Dedicoat joined BBC Radio WM at Pebble Mill in 1979 as a presenter, before moving to BBC Radio Devon four years later. After working in the West Country, he moved to London to join the Presentation Department of BBC Radio 2 in 1986 at Broadcasting House and later became its head, a position he retained until his retirement in 2015. The National Lottery and its draw programmes were launched on BBC Television in 1994. The following year, Dedicoat began working as the show's announcer. He acquired the nickname "Voice of the Balls" from presenter Sir Terry Wogan. He read the news on BBC Radio 2's weekday breakfast show, Wake Up to Wogan, until it ended in December 2009.

In September 2023, Dedicoat joined Portsmouth-based Victory Online where he currently hosts a Sunday morning show titled the "Sunday Supplement".

Dedicoat has also provided voiceovers for the Outstanding Security Performance Awards (OSPAs) and associated industry award schemes since inception.

== Personal life ==
Dedicoat is the co-owner of multiple examples of the AEC Routemaster (the best-known London red bus) with fellow broadcasters Charles Nove, Ken Bruce and Steve Madden. He is Patron of the Hospital Broadcasting Association, and has taken part in the National Hospital Radio Awards, both as the voiceover and in person. In addition, Dedicoat is the president of Hospital Radio Bedside, a hospital radio station broadcasting to hospitals in Bournemouth, Poole, Christchurch and Wimborne and also of Hospital Radio Reading (Royal Berkshire Hospital).

Dedicoat is ambassador for Wiltshire and Bath Air Ambulance Charity.
