= John Heap (geographer) =

John Arnfield Heap, CMG (5 February 1932 – 8 March 2006) was an English polar scientist who helped protect Antarctica from exploitation. He was also a civil servant in the Polar Regions Section of the Foreign and Commonwealth Office, ultimately head of section. Later he was director of the Scott Polar Research Institute.

== Career ==
John Heap was born in Manchester, England. He was educated at the Quaker-founded Leighton Park School in Reading and the University of Edinburgh where he studied geography. He began his career with pioneering research on Antarctic sea ice, for which he was awarded his doctorate at Clare College, Cambridge and the Scott Polar Research Institute (SPRI).

Dr Heap served with the Polar Regions Section of the Foreign and Commonwealth Office, and was head of the section between 1975 and 1992, during which time he advocated for the Convention on the Regulation of Antarctic Mineral Resource Activities to enable strictly regulated mining in Antarctica, but which ultimately was not ratified internationally. He was than director of the SPRI in Cambridge from 1992 to 1997.

After his retirement in 1997, he was chair of the UK Antarctic Heritage Trust and treasurer of the International Glaciological Society. He also was elected as a Liberal Democrats councillor in South Cambridgeshire District Council for Harston.

== Personal life ==
Heap married Margaret (Peggy) Spicer in 1960 and had two daughters, Sarah and Alice, and one son, Tom Heap, the BBC's Rural Affairs Correspondent and presenter of BBC One's Countryfile programme and a reporter for Panorama and BBC Radio 4's Costing the Earth programme.
