= Farming Today =

Radio programme about food, farming, and the countryside

- Genre: Farming and rural affairs news
- Running time: 13 mins (Monday-Friday); 25 mins (Saturday)
- Country of origin: United Kingdom
- Language: English
- Home station: BBC Third Programme (1960–1964); BBC Home Service (1964–1967); BBC Radio 4 (1967–present)
- Hosted by: Charlotte Smith, Anna Hill
- Produced by: Emma Campbell, Toby Field, Beatrice Fenton, Lucy Taylor
- Edited by: Dimitri Houtart
- Recording studio: BBC Bristol (2011-present), BBC Birmingham (1960-2011)
- Original release: 20 September 1960
- Website: Farming Today
- Podcast: Podcasts

Farming Today is a radio programme about food, farming, and the countryside broadcast on BBC Radio 4 in the United Kingdom.

It is broadcast each weekday morning (having been recorded the day before) from 5.45 to 5.59, and a longer programme (Farming Today This Week) is broadcast on Saturdays between 6.30 and 6.55. Each episode is available as a podcast.

== History ==
Farming Today began life on 20 September 1960 as a weekly 15-minute programme subtitled A review of current affairs in agriculture at home and abroad and broadcast at 19.15 on Tuesdays as part of the BBC's Third Network's sequence of educational broadcasting known as Network Three. From 3 October 1961 the programme's start time was moved to 19.00, and from 7 January 1964 it changed again, to 19.45.

The run of weekly programmes on Network Three came to an end on 25 August 1964 and from 31 August Farming Today (now subtitled News, market trends, and current topics) moved to a 6.35–6.50 slot on Monday to Saturday mornings on the BBC Home Service (later to become BBC Radio 4 in 1967), where it replaced the 10-minute Farm Bulletin which had been broadcast on that network at 6.40 on six mornings a week since 10 July 1962.

Between 1964 and today, with the lengthening of the Home Service / Radio 4 broadcast day, the start time of the weekday programme (which has varied between 13 and 20 minutes in length) has gradually shifted earlier, and now stands at 5.45.

== Content ==
The programme explores matters of current concern to farmers, fisherpeople, and others with an interest in countryside issues.

Farmers, environmentalists, politicians, the Soil Association, and National Farmers Union leaders are amongst those regularly interviewed for the programme.

=== Range of topics ===
Recent topics have included

- Farming and Brexit
- Badger culling
- The EU Common Agricultural Policy
- The EU Common Fisheries Policy
- Foot-and-mouth disease
- GM food and crops (biotechnology)
- Pesticides
- Organic farming
- Rural social issues e.g. housing, broadband, shops, schools, churches

== Presenters ==
The programme's main presenters are Anna Hill and Charlotte Smith. Caz Graham also presents occasionally.

=== Former presenters ===
- Robin Hicks - from 1968 to 1977, when the programme was live and transmitted from London. Later the programme team moved to Birmingham and produced a recorded edition with presenters Miriam O'Reilly and Mark Holdstock.

== See also ==
- Countryfile, on BBC One
- Agriculture in the United Kingdom
