= Water of Luce =

River in Dumfries and Galloway, Scotland

Coordinates: 54°51′N 4°50′W

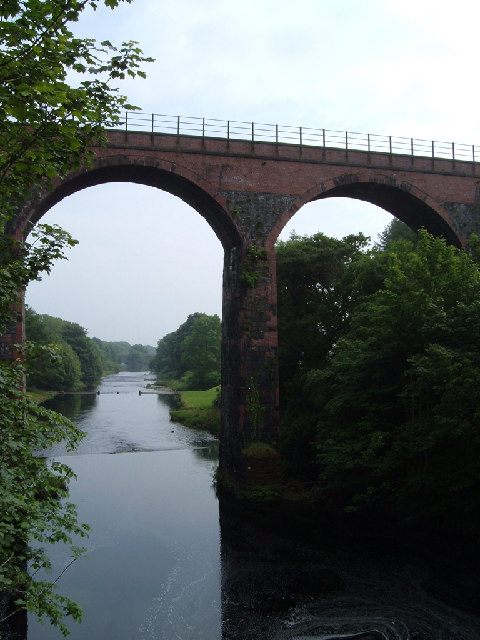
Glenluce Viaduct

The Water of Luce is a river in Dumfries and Galloway, in south west Scotland.

The Main Water of Luce rises in South Ayrshire, flows south to New Luce, where it is joined by the Cross Water of Luce, and flows into the Solway Firth at Luce Bay. The Luce is crossed by the eight-arch Glenluce Viaduct near to Glenluce. This once carried the Portpatrick Railway to Stranraer.

== Fishing ==
The Upper Proprietor is Dr Sir Nicholas Spicer Bt. of the Lagafater Estate, whilst the lower proprietor is the Rt Hon. Earl of Stair of Stair Estates. The fishing is governed by the Luce District Salmon Fishery Board.
