= Anna Hill =

British radio presenter and journalist

Anna Hill is a British radio presenter and journalist. She has presented Farming Today on BBC Radio 4 for thirty years.

== Education ==
Hill has a post-graduate diploma in radio journalism from the London College of Printing.

== Career ==
Hill's first job involved sewing trousers for a company in Wiltshire.

Following the completion of her journalistic training, Hill worked for a year and a half at a number of local radio stations. She joined the BBC as a reporter in 1986. She covered the Great storm of 1987 just after joining BBC Radio Sussex. After working at the station, she then worked at other BBC Local Radio stations before working at BBC Radio 4.

In the 1990s, Hill was a continuity announcer and newsreader at BBC Radio 4.

In 1995, Hill joined Farming Today, a programme covering news relating to, and current affairs within, UK agriculture, on BBC Radio 4. As of September 2017, she had been a presenter of the programme for over 20 years. She remains a presenter of the programme, along with Charlotte Smith and Caz Graham.

As of 2019, Hill had been a director of the Oxford Farming Conference since 2017.

As of 2023, Hill was also a presenter of On Your Farm on BBC Radio 4.

Hill has also chaired conferences, such as an OECD Rural Development conference; in 2024, she hosted a discussion between stakeholders about the future of the seed testing sector at an international association's conference. She has also reported for Countryfile and the BBC World Service about agricultural issues in countries other than the UK. She won Gold Sony Award for an episode of On Your Farm which featured a family whose dairy farm had been flooded.

== Personal life ==
Hill grew up in Dorset, and in a 2017 interview described herself as a fan of the poetry of Henry Thoreau and of kayaking. As of 2019, she lived in Norwich.
