= Antonia Bolingbroke-Kent =

British travel writer and film producer (born 1978)

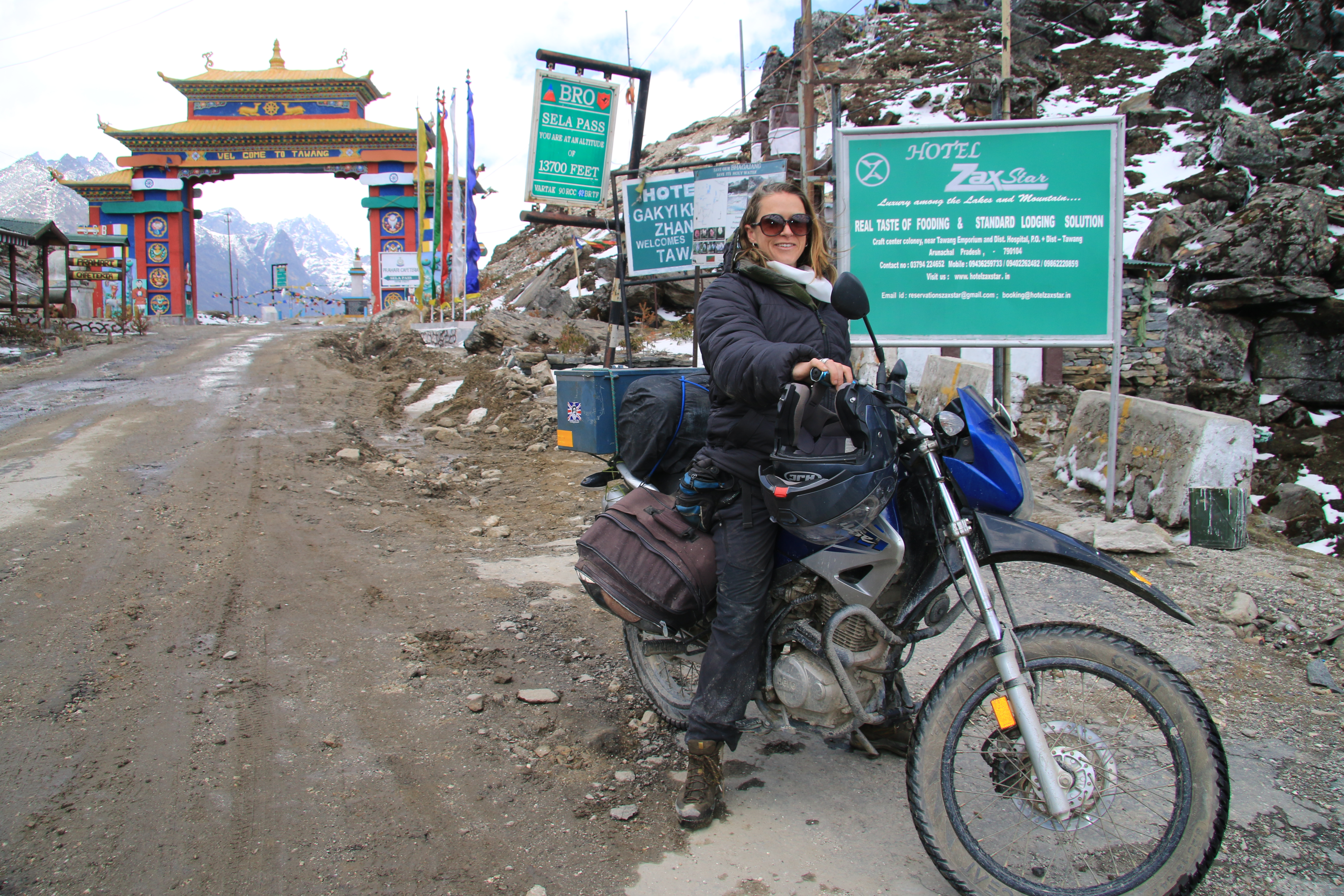
Antonia Bolingbroke-Kent in Tawang (Arunachal Pradesh)

Antonia Bolingbroke-Kent (born 29 November 1978) is a British travel writer and broadcaster who specialises in solo journeys through remote regions. Her book, Land of the Dawn-lit Mountains, was shortlisted for the 2018 Edward Stanford Travel Writing Awards.

== Personal life ==
Bolingbroke-Kent was born in Norfolk and educated at Wycombe Abbey School and The University of Edinburgh, where she studied Modern History. She is the granddaughter of Admiral Sir Walter Thomas Couchman.

== Career ==
In 2005 Bolingbroke-Kent left her job on The South Bank Show to drive an auto rickshaw from Bangkok to Brighton with her friend Jo Huxster. Their 98-day, 12,561 mile journey took them across 12 countries, including China, Kazakhstan and Russia. By completing the journey, they raised £50,000 for the mental health charity Mind, and broke the Guinness World Record for the longest ever journey by auto-rickshaw. The pair were later awarded Cosmopolitan magazine's Fun, Fearless Female Award. The comedian Stephen Fry called it a ‘brave and marvellous adventure.’

In 2013 Bolingbroke-Kent followed the remains of the Ho Chi Minh Trail through Vietnam, Laos and Cambodia on a Honda Cub motorcycle. This was her first major solo adventure. A book about this trip, A Short Ride in the Jungle, was published by Summersdale (UK) in 2014. The Irish travel writer Dervla Murphy said that she ‘enormously enjoyed every page’, and Cosmopolitan magazine described it as ‘A jaw-dropping adventure, part travelogue, part thriller….an adrenaline-fuelled, fascinating ride.’

In 2016 Bolingbroke-Kent spent three months exploring the remote Northeast Indian state of Arunachal Pradesh. Travelling by foot and motorcycle, she spent time with the Idu Mishmi, Adi, and Monpa tribes. The resulting book, Land of the Dawn-lit Mountains, was published by Simon & Schuster in the UK, India and the US.

In 2019 she was the recipient of the Royal Geographical Society's Neville Shulman Challenge Award, and spent two months exploring the Naga tribal territories of Northeast India and Myanmar.

Bolingbroke-Kent's other journeys include circumnavigating the Black Sea, motorcycling the Pamir Highway and walking a section of Georgia's Trans-Caucasian Trail.

She is a regular contributor to publications including The Telegraph, The Guardian, Wanderlust and Geographical. She has also recorded several stories for Radio 4's From our Own Correspondent. She has also produced and presented a number of documentaries for BBC Radio 4's Costing the Earth (about community-based conservation efforts in Nagaland and Tajikistan) and Open Country.

Bolingbroke-Kent has spoken about her travels at the Royal Geographical Society, the Financial Times Festival, the Kendal Mountain Festival and the Cheltenham Festival.

Until 2018, Bolingbroke-Kent worked as a freelance television producer. Her credits include World’s Most Dangerous Roads (BBC2), Tom Hardy’s Poaching Wars (ITV), Joanna Lumley’s India (ITV) and Joanna Lumley’s Silk Road Adventure (ITV).

She is also the co-founder and director of the travel company Silk Road Adventures.

== Books ==
2007

Tuk tuk to the Road: Two Girls, Three Wheels, 12,500 miles. The Friday Project (UK).

2014

A Short Ride in the Jungle: Motorcycling the Ho Chi Minh Trail. Summersdale (UK).

2017

Land of the Dawn-lit Mountains: A Journey Across India’s Forgotten Frontier. Simon & Schuster (UK, USA, India).

== Articles and broadcasts ==
The Guardian, 2022 - Trophy Hunting in Tajikistan

The Guardian, 2020 – ‘I swapped my gun for binoculars – conservation in Nagaland.’

BBC Radio 4, 2020 - ‘Fate of the Falcons’

Adventure.com, 2019 – Climbing with the Bedouin in Jordan’s Wadi Rum.

Wanderlust, 2019 – The Last Inhabitants of Kichkuldashi

The Guardian, 2017 - ‘Tribes and Shamans become your hosts..’

Interview on Radio 4’s Midweek programme. 2014.

Interview on Radio 4’s Saturday Live about the Ho Chi Minh Trail. 2014.
