= Around the World in 80 Days (2009 TV series) =

British travel documentary

- Genre: Entertainment
- Narrated by: Frank Skinner
- Country of origin: United Kingdom
- Original language: English
- No. of series: 1
- No. of episodes: 6

Production
- Executive producer: Julian Mercer
- Producer: Kez Margrie
- Running time: 60 minutes
- Production company: BBC

Original release
- Network: BBC One, BBC HD
- Release: 13 October – 17 November 2009

Related
- Children in Need 2009

Around the World in 80 Days is a British travel documentary series made to support the annual BBC Children in Need charity appeal in 2009. It sees twelve celebrities attempt to circumnavigate the globe in eighty days without using air transport, recreating the journey of Phileas Fogg and Michael Palin. Like Fogg and Palin, the journey begins and ends at the Reform Club in London. It was first shown on BBC One and BBC HD in October and November 2009.

== Production ==
The challenge for the celebrities was to travel around the globe in eighty days, starting and ending at the Reform Club in London, re-enacting the challenge made to Phileas Fogg in the 1873 Jules Verne novel, Around the World in Eighty Days, and Around the World in 80 Days with Michael Palin. In each episode, a pair of celebrities travels a single leg of the round-the-world journey, trying to meet the next pair at a handover point in sufficient time, in relay race fashion. The journey could be completed by any means except by flight. At the handover, they pass to the succeeding team a carpet bag containing, amongst other items, a journal and a phone. Each of the celebrity pairs contributed to the journal as their leg of the journey progressed, and ahead of the trip Palin wrote an entry containing advice for the travellers.

Throughout the journey, the celebrities collected various items on their leg of the journey. These were then auctioned to raise money for Children in Need, as was the journal completed by the travellers at the end of the trip.

== Episodes ==
No.	Stage	Celebrities	Directed and produced by	Original release date	Viewers (overnight estimates)
1	"England to Turkey"	Frank Skinner and Lee Mack	Rupert Miles	13 October 2009	4.2 million
Comedians Frank Skinner and Lee Mack travel from the Reform Club in London, England via the English Channel, France, Germany, Austria, Slovakia, Hungary, Serbia and Bulgaria to Turkey (crossing the Bosphorus Strait).
2	"Turkey to Kazakhstan"	Nick Hewer and Saira Khan	Matt Brandon	20 October 2009	3.6 million
Nick Hewer and Saira Khan from The Apprentice planned to travel from Turkey via Iraq, Iran, Turkmenistan and Uzbekistan to Kazakhstan, but had to travel via Georgia, Azerbaijan and the Caspian Sea after they were unable to travel through Iran due to the 2009 Iranian election protests and their visas for Uzbekistan were rejected. The pair flew by helicopter part of the way through Kazakhstan, to make up for delays resulting from not being able to take their original planned route.
3	"Kazakhstan to Mongolia"	Julia Bradbury and Matt Baker	Robert Murphy	27 October 2009	4.2 million
Countryfile presenters Julia Bradbury and Matt Baker travel to Mongolia from Kazakhstan, via Russia and the Trans Siberian Railway (China was planned but abandoned).
4	"Mongolia to California"	Bill Turnbull and Louise Minchin	Justin Kelly	4 November 2009	4.1 million
BBC Breakfast presenters Bill Turnbull and Louise Minchin travel from Mongolia (with China abandoned, the route was retraced back into Russia) via Russia, Sea of Japan, South Korea and the Pacific Ocean (crossing the International Date Line) to California, United States.
5	"California to Tennessee"	Myleene Klass and John Barrowman	Karen Selway	10 November 2009	3.9 million
Television presenters and singers Myleene Klass and John Barrowman travel across the United States from California to Tennessee via the Colorado River, Arizona, New Mexico, Texas, Louisiana and Mississippi.
6	"Tennessee to England"	Josie Lawrence and Shane Richie	Rupert Miles	17 November 2009	3.7 million
EastEnders actors Josie Lawrence and Shane Richie travel across the United States from Tennessee via Mississippi, Tennessee, Georgia and South Carolina to North Carolina, where they cross the Atlantic Ocean and return to the Reform Club in London. The pair completed the journey on the 80th day after an emergency plan was enacted to compensate for the fact that the Atlantic leg aboard the ICL ship Independent Venture was delayed due to Hurricane Bill and could no longer meet the deadline. Instead of disembarking the ship in Belgium, they disembarked on the move in the English Channel, and were taken to Plymouth by Ellen MacArthur aboard a sailing yacht, before finally catching a train to London.

== Auction items ==
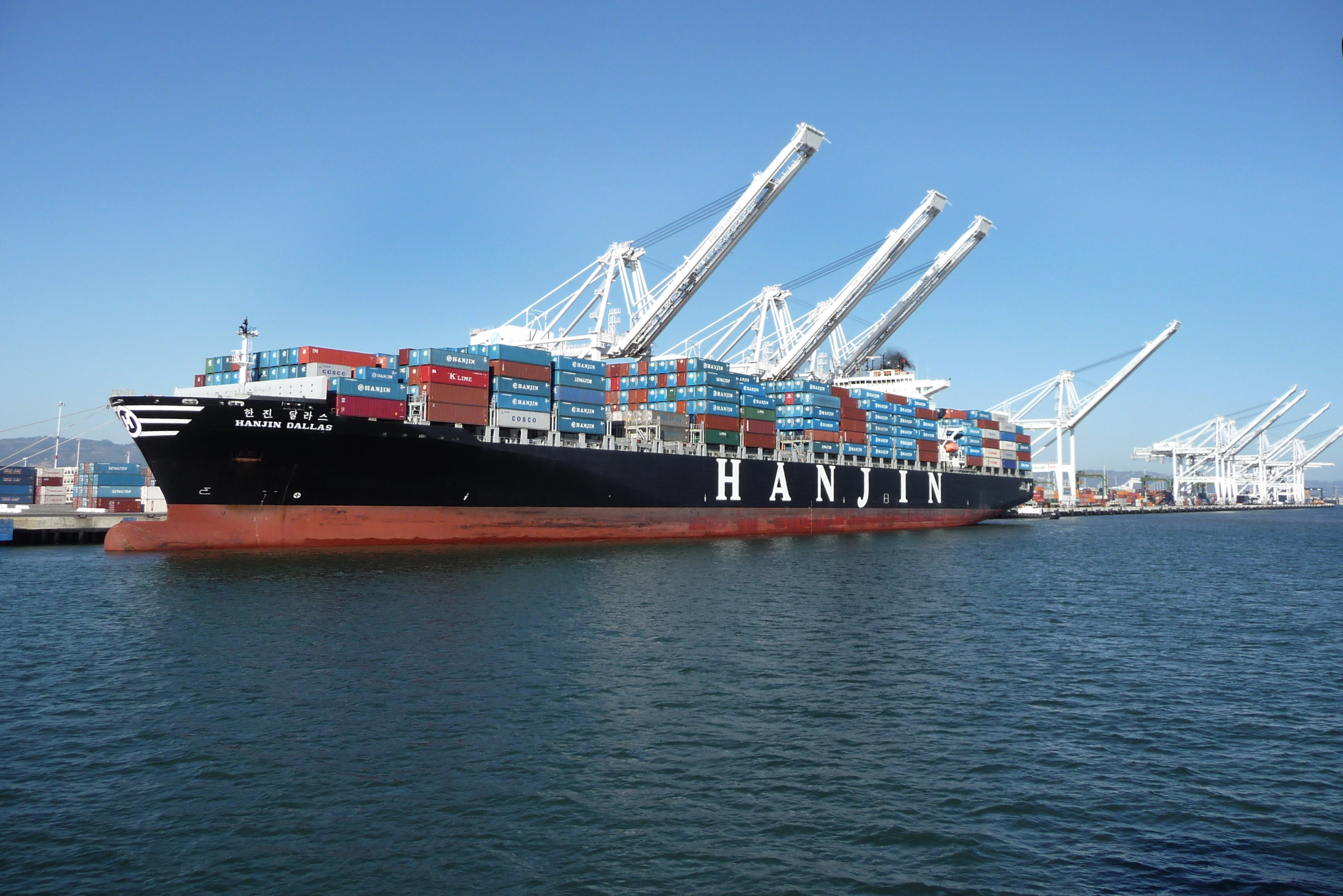
The Hanjin Dallas container ship used to cross the Pacific Ocean from Busan to Long Beach

UK to Turkey

- Ukulele played by Frank Skinner
- Pudsey bear signed by Frank Skinner
- Pudsey bear signed by Lee Mack

Turkey to Kazakhstan

- Pudsey bear signed by Nick Hewer
- Pudsey bear signed by Saira Khan

Kazakhstan to Mongolia

- Pudsey bear signed by Julia Bradbury
- Pudsey bear signed by Matt Baker

Mongolia to USA

- Selection of paintings by Louise Minchin
- Pudsey bear signed by Bill Turnbull
- Pudsey bear signed by Louise Minchin

USA (California) to USA (Memphis)

- Pink tutu
- Pair of Around the World in 80 Days Boots
- Pudsey bear signed by John Barrowman
- Pudsey bear signed by Myleene Klass

USA to UK

- Shane Richie's Outfit from 'Cargo'
- Josie Lawrence's Outfit from 'Cargo'
- Pudsey bear signed by Shane Richie
- Pudsey bear signed by Josie Lawrence
- Silver Harmonica

Other

- Around the World in 80 Days Journal
- Around the World in 80 Days Carpet Bag
