= Secret Britain =

- Genre: Nature documentary
- Presented by: Ellie Harrison (2015-2016); Denise Lewis (2016); Chris Hollins (2016); Adam Henson (2015); Matt Baker (2010); Julia Bradbury (2010)
- Country of origin: United Kingdom
- Original language: English
- No. of series: 3
- No. of episodes: 11

Production
- Running time: 60 minutes

Original release
- Network: BBC One
- Release: 15 August 2010 – 28 April 2016

Related
- Countryfile

Secret Britain is a BBC documentary series that was originally broadcast on BBC One in 2010. Two further series were broadcast in 2015 and 2016. The series explores some of the United Kingdom's hidden corners such as deserted beaches and tumbling waterfalls, showcasing the very best of what the British countryside has to offer.

The show focuses on a variety of areas of the British countryside, with a few minutes dedicated to each particular area of interest.

== Episodes ==
=== Transmissions ===
Series	Start date	End date	Episodes	Presenters
1	15 August 2010	5 September 2010	4	Julia Bradbury and Matt Baker
2	8 April 2015	22 April 2015	3	Ellie Harrison and Adam Henson
3	30 March 2016	20 April 2016	4	Ellie Harrison, Chris Hollins and Denise Lewis

=== Series 1 ===
Episode number	Name	Air date	Description
1	The Crowded South	15 August 2010	The first episode starts off in Cornwall and ends in Dover. Some of the locations seen in this episode are: Pentire – Pentire Headland, Pentire Point; Padstow – Lundy Hole; Mevagissey – Cornish Alps; Bodmin Moor; Tintagel – Rocky Valley; Devon – Dartmoor National Park, Black-a-Tor Copse, Haytor Granite Tramway, Stover Canal; Salisbury Plain; South Downs; Dungeness – Shingle Beach; Dover – Langdon Bay
2	The Hidden Heart	22 August 2010	The second episode starts in the flatlands of East Anglia and ends at the wild, rugged Welsh coast. Some of the locations seen in this episode are: Norfolk Broads – Heigham Holmes; Lincolnshire Wolds; The Chilterns – Barton Caves; Peak District – The Winking Man, The Roaches, Back Forest, Lud's Church, High Peak Trail, Middleton Mine; Staffordshire – Rudyard Lake; Shropshire – Silvington Common; Snowdonia National Park – Cwm Idwal Hanging Gardens, Devil's Kitchen; Pembrokeshire – Bosherston Lily Ponds, Castlemartin Range
3	True North	29 August 2010	The third episode begins in Derbyshire and travels north to the coast of County Durham. Some of the locations seen in this episode are: Peak District – Fin Cop Hillfort, Mam Tor Hillfort; Cheshire – Trent and Mersey Canal, Lion Salt Works, Anderton Boat Lift; Morecambe Bay; Sunderland Point – Sambo's Grave; Chorley – Rivington Pike, Chinese Gardens; Yorkshire – Limestone Pavement, Alum Pot; Cumbria – Howgill Fells, Pendragon Castle; Lake District – Derwent Island House, Surprise View; Kirkby Stephen – Nine Standards Rigg; Peterlee – Castle Eden Dene
4	Borderlands and Beyond	5 September 2010	The fourth episode starts at the borders and travels to the North West point of Britain. Some of the locations seen in this episode include: College Valley; Antonine Wall; Dunmore Pineapple; Kirriemuir's Camera Obscura; Loch Etive; Glen Coe – Three Sisters and Hidden Valley; Caledonian Sleeper – Corrour railway station; Sands of Forvie; Outer Hebrides – Machair, North Uist; Corrieshalloch Gorge – the Falls of Measach; Whaligoe steps; Cape Wrath – Kearvaig beach from Kinlochbervie and Faraid Head

=== Series 2 ===
Episode number	Name	Air date	Description
1	Water World of Wales	8 April 2015	
2	Mysterious Moors of Yorkshire	April 2015	
3	Hidden Highlands of Scotland	April 2015	

=== Series 3 ===
Episode number	Name	Air date	Description
1	The Lakes	30 March 2016	Filmed in the Lake District
2	Kent	6 April 2016	
3	Devon	20 April 2016	
4	Northern Ireland	28 April 2016	
