= Caz Graham =

British broadcaster

Catherine Graham (born 1965) is a British broadcaster, known mostly for her work on Farming Today on BBC Radio 4.

== Early life ==
She went to school in Cumbria, becoming head girl at her comprehensive school. She studied Politics (BSc) at the University of Bristol. She was born in Carlisle and grew up on a farm in north Cumbria.

== Career ==
She started at BBC Radio Cumbria in the 1990s, then moving to BBC Scotland in Glasgow from 1994–98 as one of the Fred Macaulay Show producers. She was an occasional producer for Woman's Hour and short Radio 4 programmes. She has also written for Cumbria Life Magazine since 2013

=== Farming Today ===
She presents Farming Today, along with Charlotte Smith and Anna Hill. She also presents On Your Farm on BBC Radio 4.

== Personal life ==
She lives in Kendal, Cumbria. She married Rigby Jerram in 2003 in Cumbria. She has two children, a daughter and a son.
