= Pump It Up =

Pump It Up may refer to:

- Pump It Up (video game series)
- Pump It Up (TV series), a children's television series
- "Pump It Up" (Elvis Costello song)
- "Pump It Up" (Joe Budden song)
- "Pump It Up!" (Danzel song), remixed in 2019 by British DJ Endor
- "Pump It Up", a song by MC Hammer
