= The Lagafater Estate =

Estate in Dumfries and Galloway, Scotland

- Interactive map of The Lagafater Estate
- Coordinates: 55.044051°N 4.914675°W
- Website: www.lagafater.co.uk

Lagafater is a 7000-acre (2832.8 ha) former sporting estate near New Luce in Dumfries and Galloway, Scotland. Since 1910 it has been in the family of its present owner, Sir Nicholas Spicer, Bt.

== History ==
Originally in the hands of the Earl of Cassillis, lands including Lagafater were gifted to Thomas Kennedy of Bargany in 1541 and 1550. The estate remained in the wider Kennedy family before being sold in 1822 to the Trustees of John, Earl of Stair. From there, it was sold to Robert Stewart of Corfin in 1847, to Sir George de la Poer Beresford in 1859, to the noted solicitor William White Millar SSC in 1863 and finally to the British Linen Company in 1887.

In 1894, White Millar re-purchased the Estate, and united it with the Dalnigap Estate which he had previously purchased in 1892. White Millar was subsequently imprisoned for embezzlement, and the estate was sold in 1910 to Cedric Randall Boult, father of the internationally noted conductor, Sir Adrian Boult. Sir Adrian's musical commitments were such that he could not visit often, and the estate was inherited by his sister, Olive I E Boult, before passing to her step-great-nephew, Sir Nicholas Spicer Bt.

== The Houses ==
The principal dwelling is Lagafater Lodge, a large Edwardian hunting lodge that was built by Robert Stewart esq. in 1846 as a 'house for the accommodation of Sports Men'. The estate crofts and cottages have comprised Lagafater Cottage, Strabracken (ruined), Barnvannoch and Shennas (now sold). Dalnigap House, originally the principal dwelling for the Dalnigap Estate, is now also in private hands.

The earliest habitations, however, are evidenced by the ancient Hut Circles that lie 800m south of Lagafater Lodge. These were recognized by the Royal Commission on the Ancient and Historical Monuments of Scotland (RCAHMS) in 1981.

== The Estate ==
Originally a large heather moorland, the best preserved areas can be found in the Black Glen, to the north of the estate. The high point, Beneraird (439m) affords a view over four kingdoms (England, Scotland, Man, and Northern Ireland). In addition, there are several large coniferous plantations throughout the estate.

Alongside the Main Water of Luce, a category 3 Salmon River, the estate is home to many burns: Laggie, Scraby Lane, Lagganbeastie, Drummanmoan Loan, Pinwherran and the Loan of Turchloy. There are a number of dramatic falls, notably at Whisky and Dungeon Glens and at Loups of Dalnigap.

A large part of the estate falls within the Glenapp and Galloway Moors Site of Special Scientific Interest (SSSI).

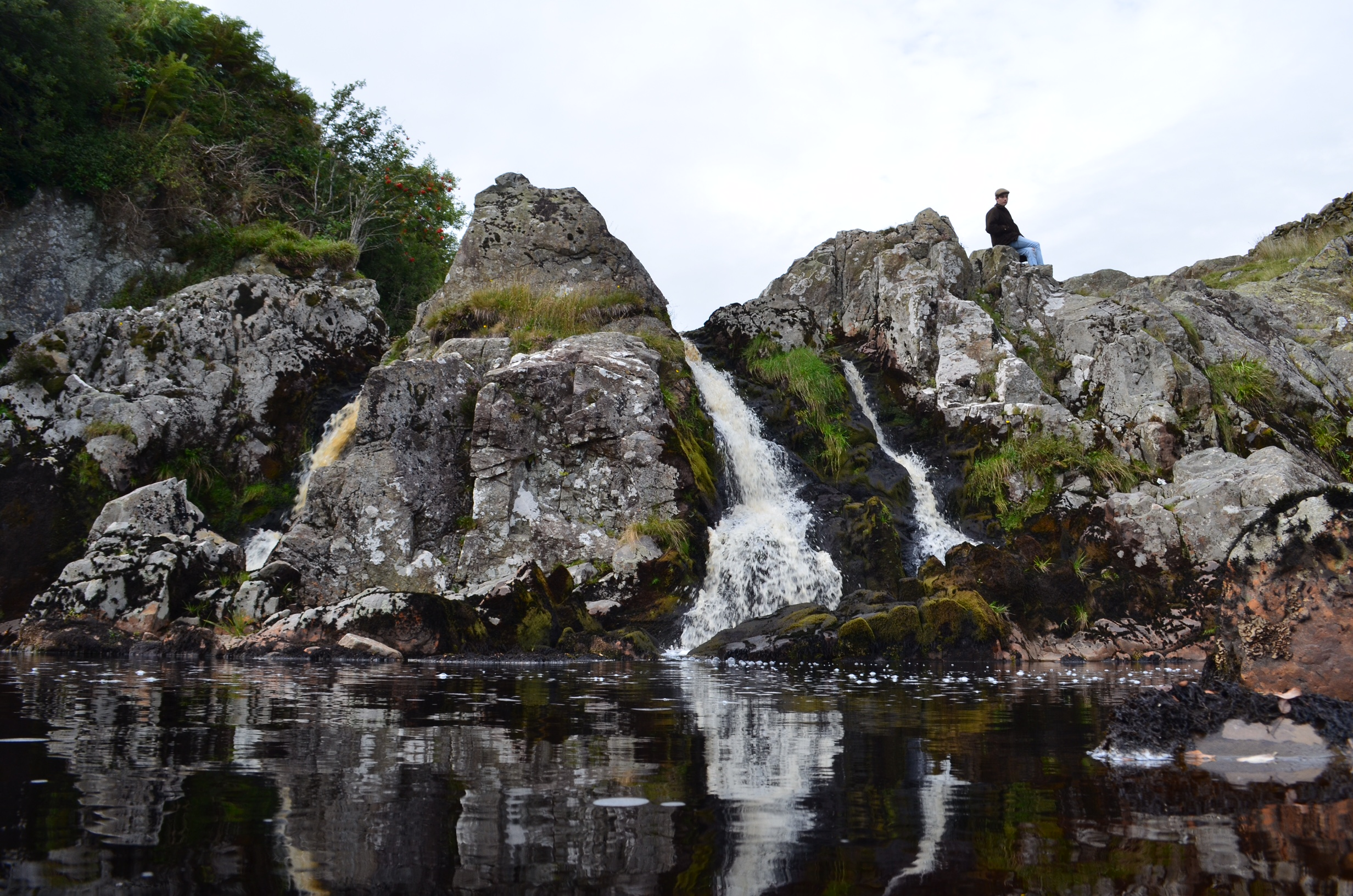
Loups of Dalnigap

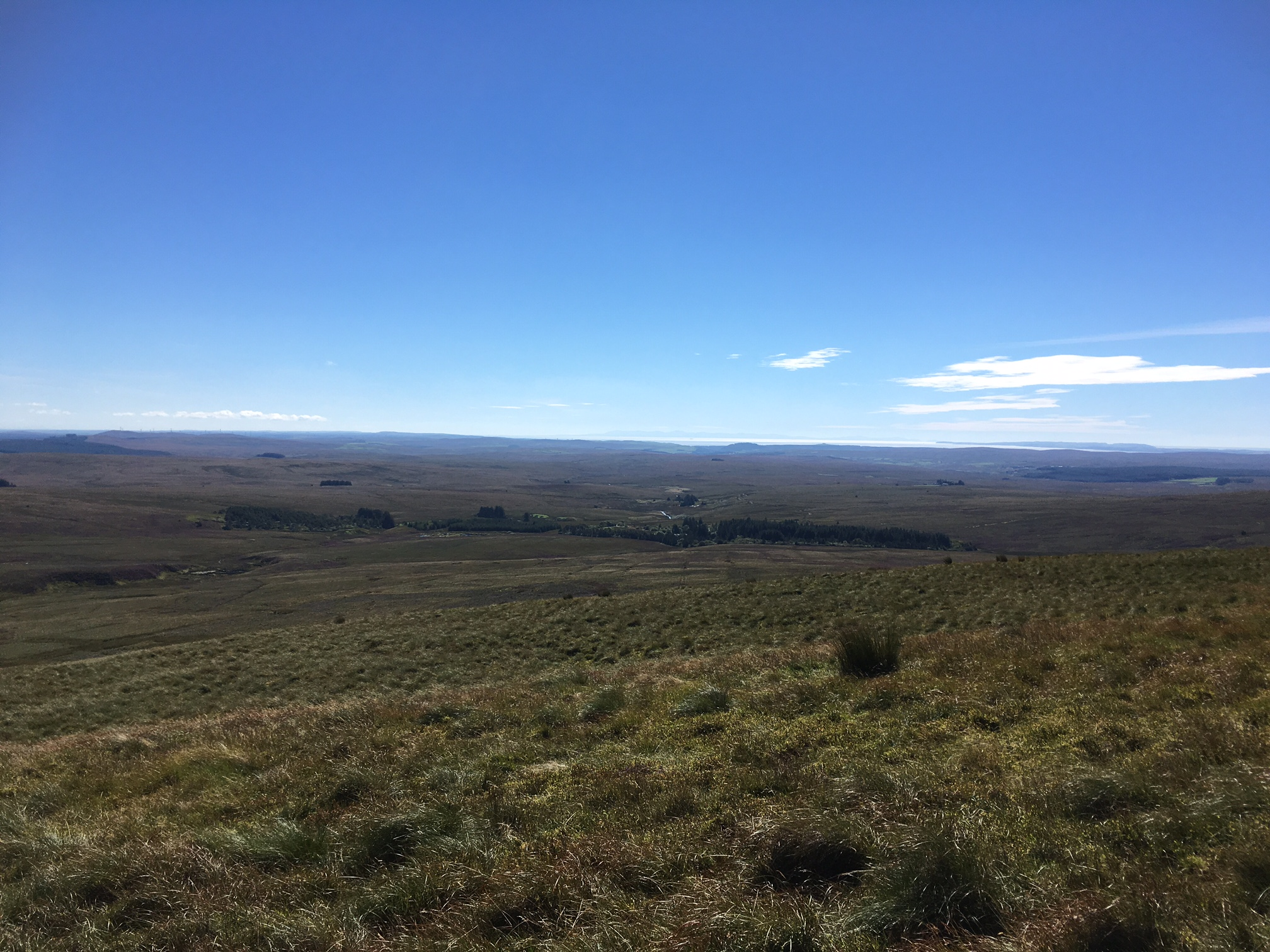
The Black Glen

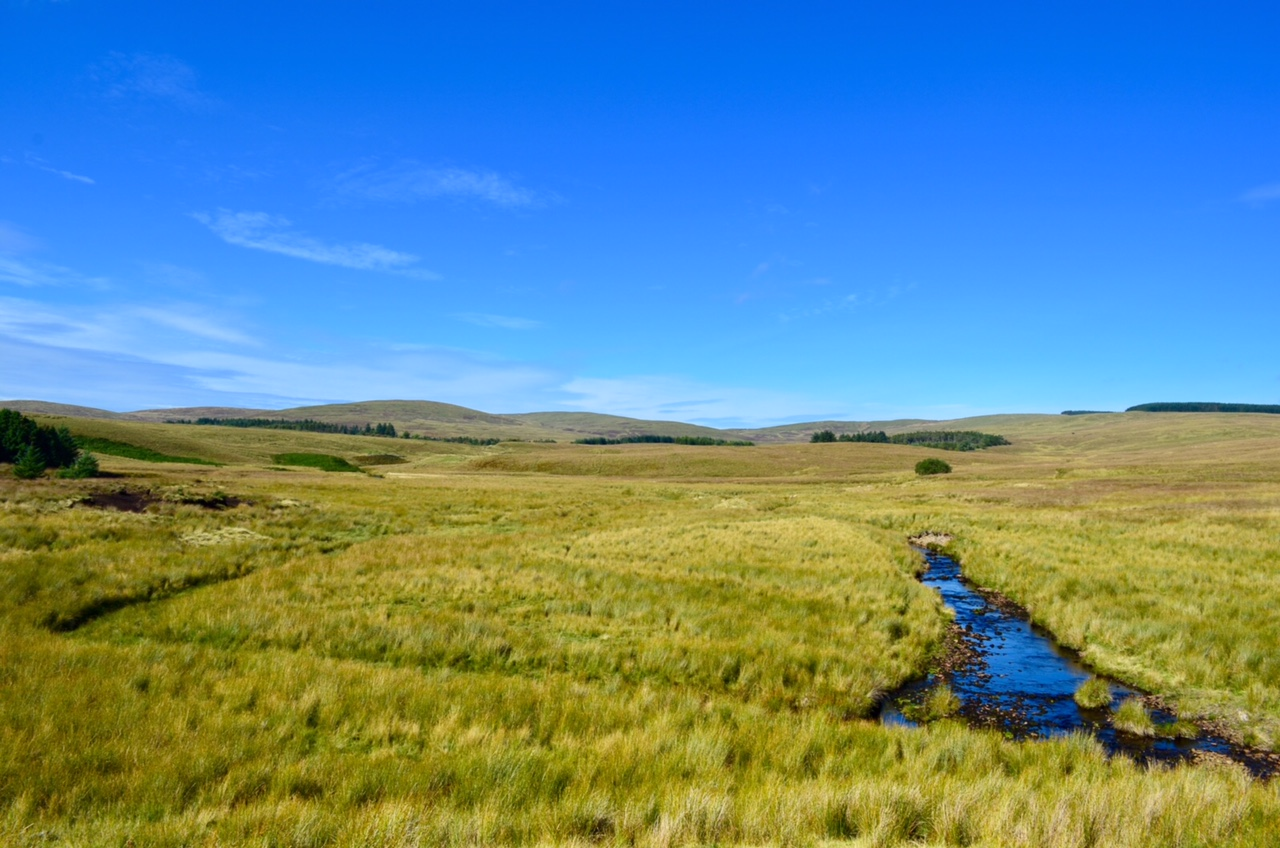
The Centre of the Estate, from the dismantled dam.

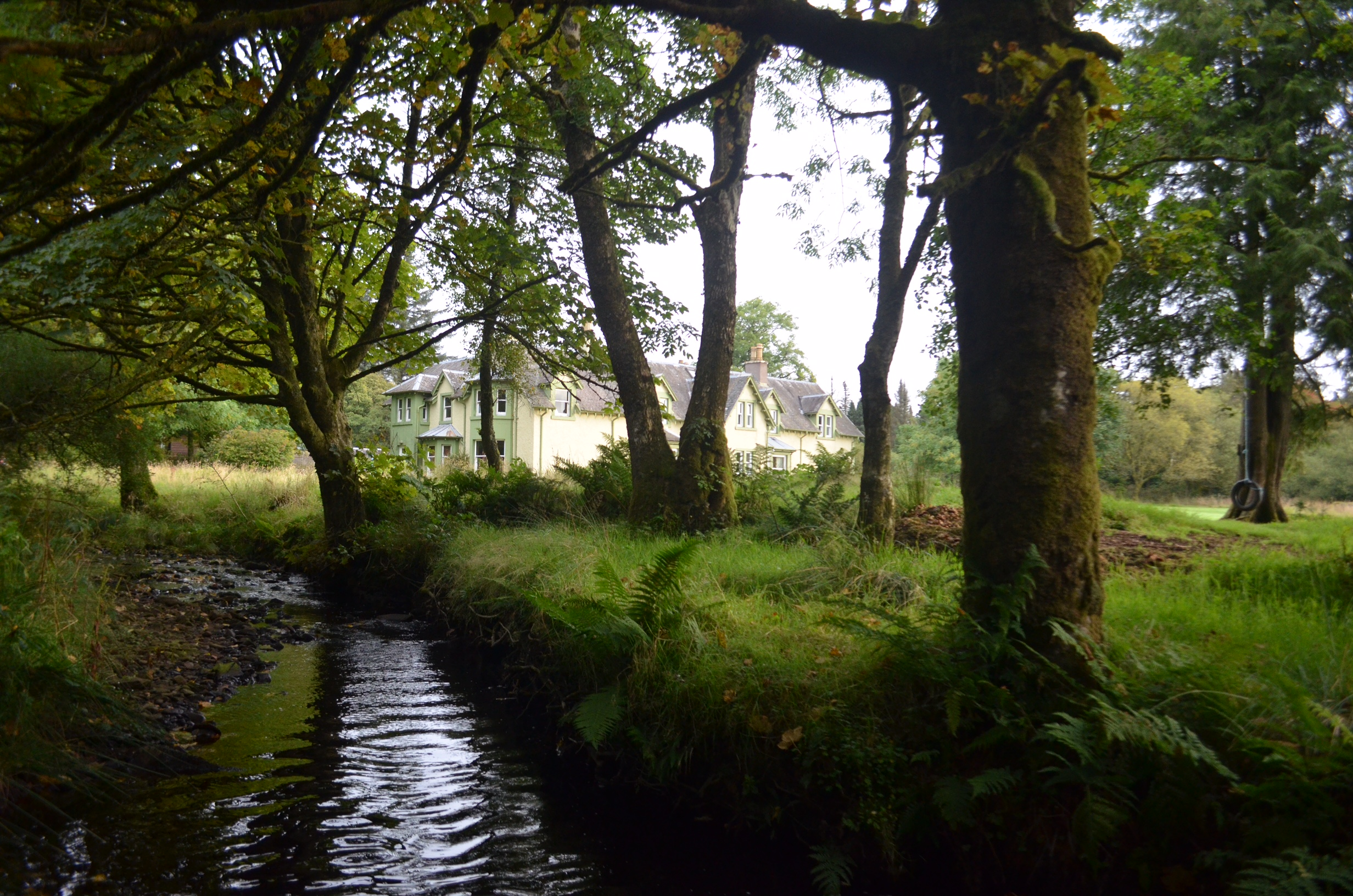
Lagafater Lodge from Laggie Burn

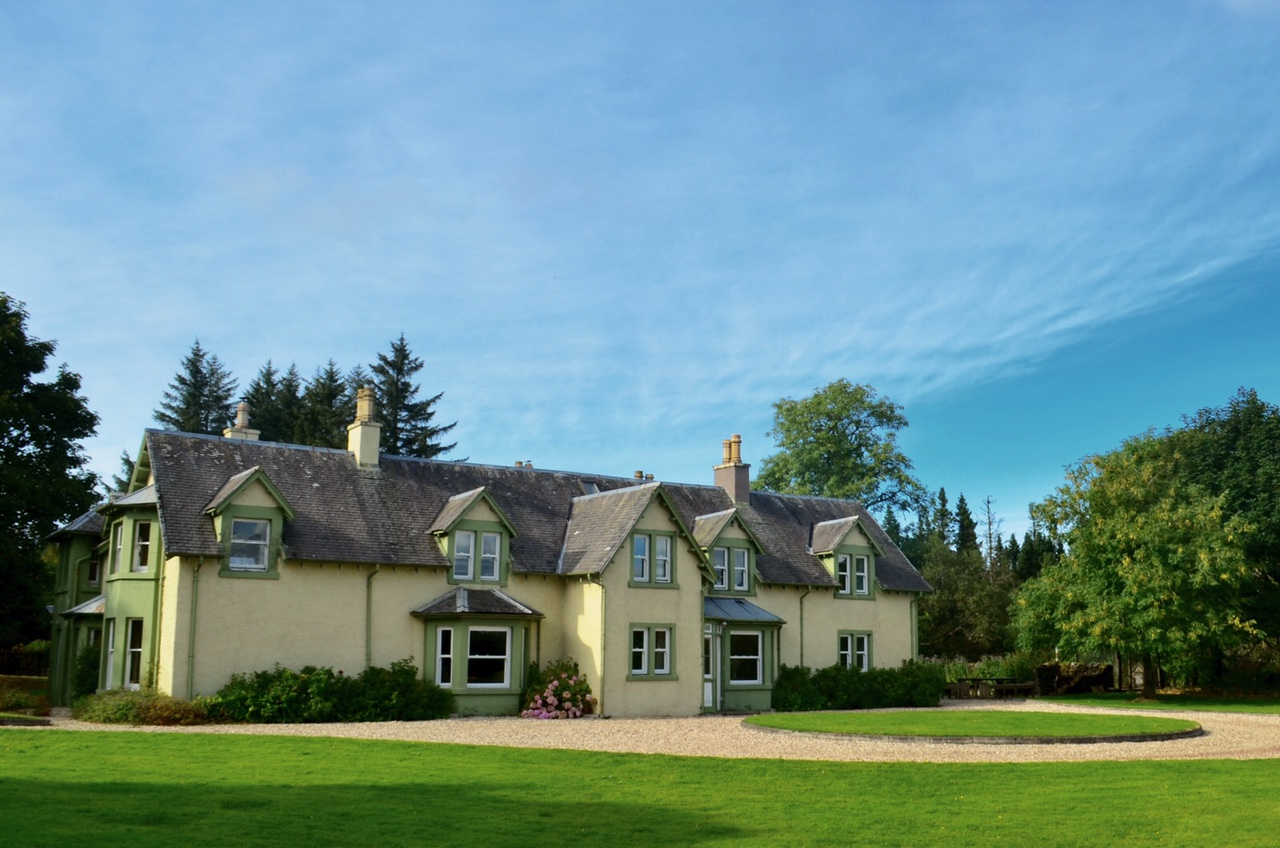
The main façade of the Lodge
