= Sir William Romney's School, Tetbury =

Sir William Romney's School

Location
- Tetbury, Gloucestershire, GL8 8AE; 51°38′48″N 2°09′37″W

Information
- Type: Academy
- Established: 1610 (as Tetbury Grammar School)
- Department for Education URN: 136985 Tables
- Ofsted: Reports
- Headteacher: Will Ruscoe
- Age: 11 to 16
- Enrolment: 484
- Houses: Pegasus, Orion, Andromeda, Hydra
- Website: swr.gloucs.sch.uk

Sir William Romney's School is an 11–16 secondary school with academy status in Tetbury, Gloucestershire, England. Pupils come from the Tetbury, Leighterton, Stroud, Cirencester, Nailsworth and Avening areas. In 2016 the school achieved a 'Good' rating from Ofsted.

== History ==
Sir William Romney (died 1611), a native of Tetbury, was one of the founders of the East India Company. He set aside some money in his will for a school to help children read and write.

In 1837 a National School was built off the Charlton road. In 1921 a grammar school called Sir Willam Romney's School was opened in Long Street. In 1952 it had become a comprehensive school, and in 1969 it moved to the current site at the end of Lowfield Road. The school was awarded Performing Arts status in 2005.

Despite a fight to keep the school's sixth form from closing, Sir William Romney's 16 to 18 provision ended in 2007.

The school's 400th anniversary was celebrated in 2010. In 2020 Sir William Romney's School joined The Athelstan Trust, a multi-academy trust consisting of secondary schools in Wiltshire and Gloucestershire.

=== Headteachers ===
- 1995–2008: Eric Dawson
- 2008–2016: Steven Mackay
- 2016–2022: Jon Bell
- 2023: Rob Skipp (acting head)
- Since 2023: Will Ruscoe

== Pipe organ ==
In 2017 a 19th-century pipe organ, built by William Sweetland of Bath, was relocated to the school from Claremont Methodist Chapel, Bath. The two-manual organ is in the main hall and has 13 speaking stops. The cost of relocating the organ was met by parents and friends of the school. The organ relocation was carried out by head of music, Peter Dillon, assisted by a retired organ builder.

The organ has the following departments and stops:

- Pedal: Bourdon 16′
- Great: Open Diapason 8′, Dulciana 8′, Clarabella 8′, Principal 4′, Flute 4′, Fifteenth 2′
- Swell (fully enclosed): Open Diapason 8′, Lieblich Gedact 8′, Salicional 8′, Vox Celeste 8′, Principal 4′, Oboe 8′

== Notable alumni ==
- Ellie Harrison – television presenter (Countryfile)
- Colin Kazim-Richards – footballer, attended the school for one year in 1998
- Shaun Williamson – known for playing Barry Evans in Eastenders, attended the school in the 1970s
- Charlie Austin – footballer
- Jack Leach – cricketer
- Andy Bush – radio presenter
- Simon Rimmer – chef and television personality
