= Matt Baker =

British television presenter (born 1977)

Matt Baker MBE
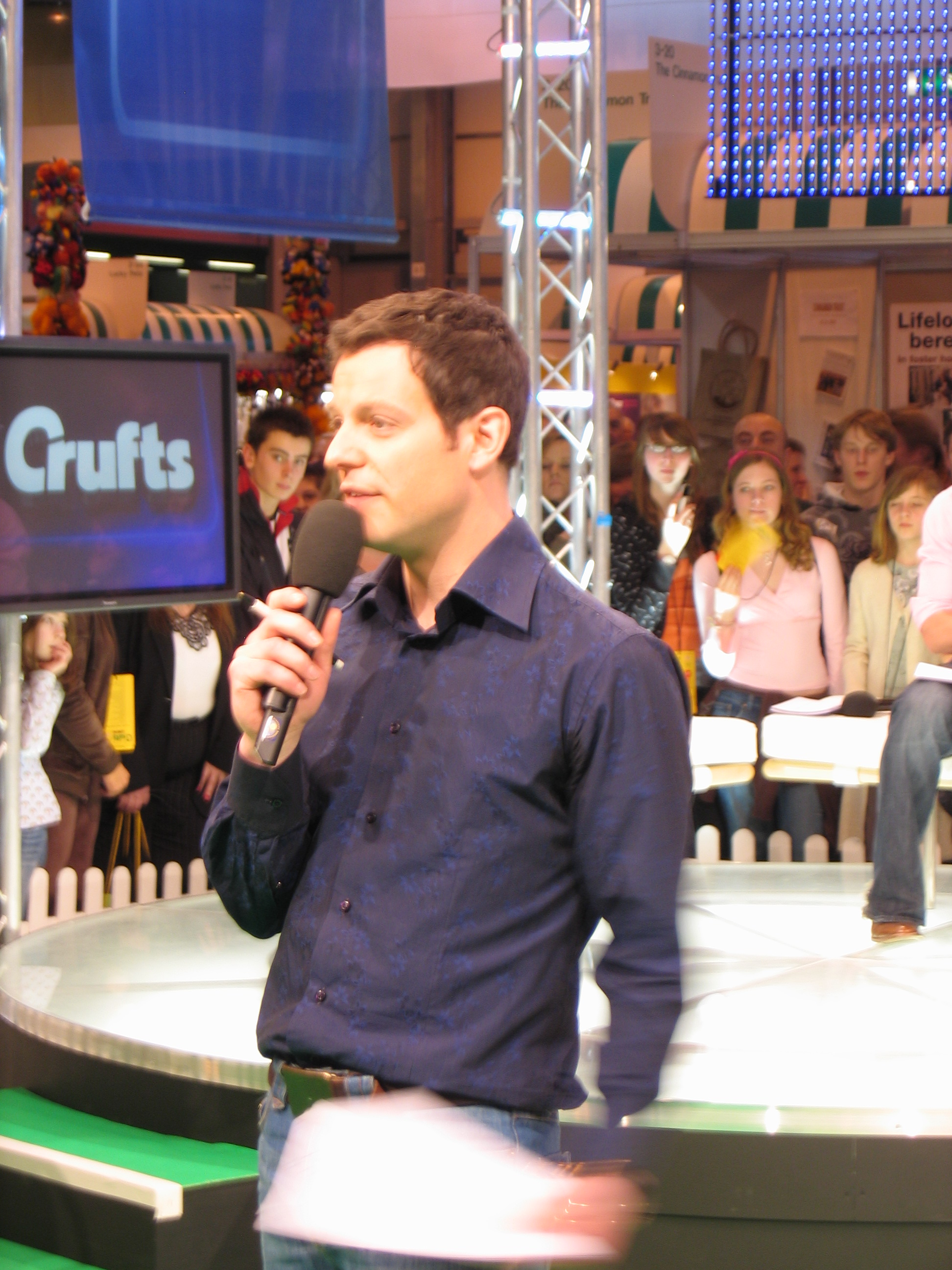
- Matt Baker presenting the BBC's coverage of Crufts 2008
- Born: Matthew James Baker; 23 December 1977 (age 48); Easington, County Durham, England
- Education: Queen Margaret University
- Occupation: Television presenter
- Years active: 1999–present
- Television: Blue Peter; Countryfile; The One Show; The Gift; Big Blue Live; Wild Alaska Live; The Great Rickshaw Relay Challenge
- Spouse: Nicola Mooney (m. 2004)
- Children: 2

Matthew James Baker MBE (born 23 December 1977) is a British television presenter. He co-presented the children's television show Blue Peter from 1999 until 2006, BBC One's Countryfile since 2009 and The One Show from 2011 to 2020, with Alex Jones.

== Early life ==
Baker was born on 23 December 1977 at Easington in County Durham where his father ran a newsagent's shop, and his parents had a smallholding in the village. He has one sister and two half-sisters.

Matt attended Easington Village School until age ten when his parents bought a farm west of Durham, which they moved into and renovated. From the age of five, Baker was a keen dancer and began competing as a gymnast whilst at school. He continued his education at Belmont Comprehensive School in Durham where he was a budding gymnast. After being diagnosed with anaemia at age 14, he was forced to give up gymnastics. He took A-levels in Drama, Biology and Sports Science at Durham Sixth Form Centre. Baker moved to Edinburgh to train as an actor at Queen Margaret University School of Drama.

In the late 1990s, as a drama student at Queen Margaret University College, Baker worked as an entertainer, and with a 1970s comedy disco-dancing revival show called "Disco Inferno", which toured the north of England.

== Career ==
=== Blue Peter ===
Baker wanted to become a physiotherapist, but did not achieve the necessary academic standards. After an appearance in the school production of Grease, it was suggested that he attend drama school. Having just finished the second year of a three-year course at Queen Margaret College, Edinburgh, his future wife's aunt spotted that Blue Peter was looking for a new presenter. After calling into the Editor's office direct, Baker put together a showreel with footage in the farmyard; reading a story; and riding a unicycle. He was asked to come to London the next day for an interview, and made his first appearance on the show on 25 June 1999. His gymnastic background helped him in physical challenges, including training as a stuntman, and passing the recruitment courses for both the Royal Marines and the Parachute Regiment. In 2003, Baker learned to fly hang gliders and made a successful tandem world record-breaking flight with Airways Airsports instructor Judy Leden MBE.

During his seven years on Blue Peter, Matt's colleagues were Katy Hill, Konnie Huq, Simon Thomas, Liz Barker, Zöe Salmon and Gethin Jones. He won two BAFTAs for Best Children's Presenter two years in a row and a Royal Television Society award. Baker left Blue Peter at the end of its 2005–06 series; his last live show was broadcast on 26 June. Baker's dog Meg, seen alongside him on the programme from 2000 onwards, left with him.

=== Countryfile ===
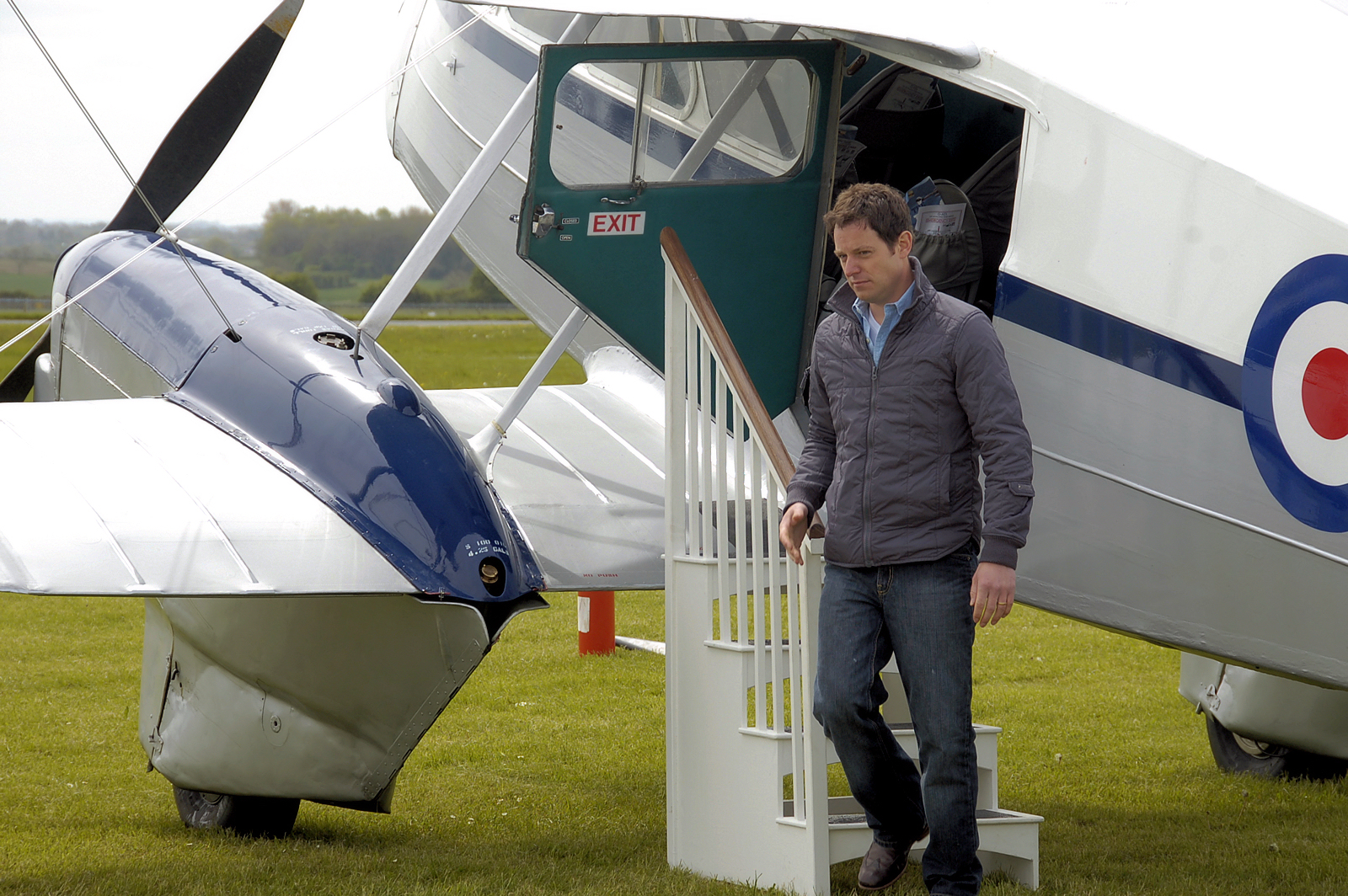
Matt Baker filming Countryfile at Cotswold Airport in Gloucestershire

Baker co-presented Countryfile Summer Diaries on weekday mornings on BBC One, along with Open Country for Radio 4 and Animal Rescue Squad and Animal Rescue Squad International for Channel 5. From 2009, he has co-presented BBC One's Countryfile on Sunday evenings. In August 2010, Baker co-presented the first series of Secret Britain with Julia Bradbury and presented One Man and His Dog with Kate Humble.

=== The One Show ===
From May to August 2010, Baker was a guest presenter on BBC One's magazine programme The One Show, standing in for Jason Manford. Following Manford's resignation on 18 November 2010, Baker acted as a guest co-host on the programme. He later took over as a permanent presenter on the show, co-hosting with Alex Jones from Monday to Thursday.

On 8 March 2011, Baker gained media attention by asking then-Prime Minister David Cameron, "How on earth do you sleep at night?". Will Heaven, Deputy Editor of Telegraph Blogs, wrote: "Was this the unearthing of a true Northern lefty? Or did Baker just misspeak?".

On 4 December 2019, Baker announced on The One Show that he would be leaving in the spring of 2020. He announced it in an emotional speech to camera where he thanked everyone for their support, especially for the money donated to The Rickshaw Challenges.

Matt's last show on The One Show was on Tuesday 31 March 2020, where he was not on the couch with co-presenter Alex Jones, but was at home in self isolation in the COVID-19 pandemic.

=== Other television work ===
In 2003, Baker was a guest on A Song For Europe contest to decide the UK entry to the Eurovision Song Contest, where he announced the scores for the North of England. He was one of three main presenters on the final series of the BBC One reality series City Hospital. In March 2007, and again in 2008, Baker co-presented coverage of Crufts. Also in 2007, he co-presented five episodes of Animal Rescue Live with Selina Scott. The episodes were shown across a week and were broadcast live from Battersea Dogs & Cats Home in London.

As part of the celebration for London's winning bid to host the 2012 Olympics, Baker co-hosted the London 2012 party with Claudia Winkleman on 24 August 2008, after the closing ceremony of the Beijing Olympics. For the BBC's coverage of the 2008 Summer Olympics in Beijing, Baker commentated on the gymnastics events. He provided commentary for the gymnastics at the 2012 Summer Olympics in London, as well as doing some presenting other morning coverage. Matt Baker was also a Torch Bearer for the Olympic Flame as it was carried into Durham City as part of the flame's tour of Great Britain. In 2016, Baker again provided the commentated on and presented from the gymnastic events at the Rio Olympics. Matt continued his previous commentating work by providing commentary for the Tokyo 2020 and Paris 2024 gymnastics events.

Baker has also commentated on the gymnastics for the BBC at World and European Championships, as well as the Commonwealth Games. For the Glasgow 2014 Commonwealth Games, Baker presented from and commentated on live gymnastics events. He also commentated on the gymnastics for the Gold Coast 2018 and Birmingham 2022 games.

In October 2009, Baker took part in the reality programme Around the World in 80 Days to raise money for Children in Need. He undertook the Kazakhstan to Mongolia leg with Julia Bradbury. For Children in Need, Baker rode a bicycle towing a rickshaw 484 miles from Edinburgh to London in 2011, which took about a week up to the fund raising night on 18 November. He averaged around 60 miles per day, raising well over £1.5 million for the charity. In the summer of 2006, Baker was a celebrity showjumper in the Sport Relief event Only Fools on Horses.

In 2015, Baker along with Mel Giedroyc co-hosted four-part BBC One series The Gift. In 2015, Baker co-hosted a three-part factual series Big Blue Live for BBC One. The series focussed on marine wildlife in Monterey Bay, California. He hosted alongside Steve Backshall, Liz Bonnin, Hugh Fearnley-Whittingstall and Lindsey Chapman.

In July 2017, Baker co-presented Wild Alaska Live on BBC One with Steve Backshall and Liz Bonnin.

=== Strictly Come Dancing ===
In 2010, Baker participated in the eighth series of Strictly Come Dancing, where he was partnered with professional ballroom dancer Aliona Vilani, finishing in second place to the winners Kara Tointon and Artem Chigvintsev in the final. Baker and Vilani also participated in the 2011 Strictly Come Dancing Live Tour. They performed in all thirty-five shows on the tour in arenas throughout Britain and Ireland, winning on twenty-six occasions.

Performances

Week	Dance/song	Judges' score					Result
Week	Dance/song	Horwood	Goodman	Dixon	Tonioli	Total	Result
1	Cha-Cha-Cha / Ain't No Mountain High Enough	7	8	8	8	31	N/A
2	Foxtrot / She Said	7	8	8	8	31	Safe
3	Quickstep / Dreaming of You	8	7	8	8	31	Safe
4	Charleston / Forty-Second Street	9	9	9	8	35	Safe
5	Argentine Tango / Bat Out of Hell	8	8	9	9	34	Safe
6	Viennese Waltz / Where the Wild Roses Grow	8	9	9	9	35	Safe
7	Rumba / Too Lost in You	8	9	9	9	35	Safe
8	Samba / Young Hearts Run Free	9	9	10	10	38	Safe
9	American Smooth / Empire State of Mind (Part II) Broken Down	8	8	8	9	33	Safe
10	Jive / Soul Bossa Nova	8	9	9	9	35	Safe
11	Salsa / Spinning Around	7	7	7	7	28	Safe
11	Swing / In the Mood	N/A	N/A	N/A	N/A	2nd/4 points	Safe
11	Tango / Hung Up	9	10	10	9	38	Safe
12	Samba / Young Hearts Run Free	9	9	10	10	38	Second place
12	Showdance / I Like The Way (You Move)	7	9	9	9	34	Second place
12	Paso Doble / Don't Let Me Be Misunderstood	9	8	9	9	35	Second place
12	Viennese Waltz / Where the Wild Roses Grow	9	9	10	9	37	Second place

=== Acting ===
In 2005, Baker briefly appeared as himself, as the presenter of Blue Peter, in an episode of sci-fi series Doctor Who, when The Doctor was flicking through television channels. In June 2006, Baker played the role of Dick from The Famous Five in The Queen's Handbag.

In 2008, Baker returned to his native North East England to play the role of Caractacus Potts in a production of Chitty Chitty Bang Bang at the Sunderland Empire.

== Personal life ==
Baker met his future wife Nicola, a physiotherapist, when he was performing in the disco show at Pier 39 in Cleethorpes. The couple married at Winston in Teesdale, in 2004 and live in Buckinghamshire with their son and daughter.

Baker was appointed Member of the Order of the British Empire (MBE) in the 2022 New Year Honours for charitable and voluntary services to fundraising.

=== Charity ===
In early 2011, Baker was elected as the president for the National Federation of Young Farmers' Clubs. He is president for Here4Horses.

=== Awards ===
Baker has been elected to receive an honorary Doctor of Science from Durham University for January 2025.

== Filmography ==
Television

Year	Title	Roles	Notes
1999–2006	Blue Peter	Presenter	
2005	Doctor Who	Himself	"Aliens of London" episode
2006	The Famous Five	Dick	
2006	Only Fools on Horses	Contestant	Finished third
2006	Gymnastics on the BBC	Commentator	
2006	The One Show	Reporter	
2006–2008	Evacuation	Presenter	
2007	Crufts	Presenter	
2007	Animal Rescue Live	Co-presenter	With Selina Scott
2008	Countryfile Summer Diaries	Presenter	
2008	2008 Summer Olympics	Presenter	Gymnastics
2008	London 2012 Party	Co-presenter	With Claudia Winkleman
2009	Around The World in 80 Days	Contestant	With Julia Bradbury
2009–	Countryfile	Co-presenter	
2010	The One Show	Presenter	Stand-in presenter
2010	Secret Britain	Co-presenter	With Julia Bradbury
2010	Strictly Come Dancing	Contestant	Finished as runner-up
2011–2020	The One Show	Co-presenter	Monday–Thursday co-host, with Alex Jones
2012	2012 Summer Olympics	Presenter	Gymnastics coverage
2014	The Sport Relief Games Show	Co-presenter	With Alex Jones and John Inverdale
2014	2014 Commonwealth Games	Presenter	Gymnastics coverage
2015	The Gift	Co-presenter	With Mel Giedroyc
2015	Big Blue Live	Co-presenter	Three-part BBC series
2015	Gymnastics World Championships	Presenter	Gymnastics coverage
2016	2016 Summer Olympics	Presenter	Gymnastics coverage
2017–	Wild Alaska Live	Co-presenter	Three-part BBC series
2017	Gymnastics: World Championships	Presenter	BBC Two
2018	2018 Gymnastics World Cup	Presenter	Studio Presentation & Commentator
2018	Royal Wedding Watch	Co-presenter	With Meredith Vieira for PBS
2018	European Gymnastics Championships	Presenter	Studio Presentation & Commentator
2019	Classic FM	Presenter	Stand-in presenter
2019	2019 Gymnastics World Cup	Presenter	Studio Presentation & Commentator
2019	European Gymnastics Championships	Presenter	Studio Presentation & Commentator
2019	Magic Breakfast	Presenter	Stand-in presenter for Magic FM breakfast show
2019	Gymnastics World Championships	Presenter	Studio Presentation & Commentator
2020	The Big Night In	Co-presenter	
2021	2020 Summer Olympics	Presenter	Gymnastics coverage
2021–	Matt Baker: Our Farm in the Dales	Presenter	Channel 4
2021	BBC Children In Need – The Great Rickshaw Relay Challenge	Presenter	BBC1
2022–2024	Matt Baker: Travels with Mum & Dad	Presenter	Channel 4
2022	Birmingham 2022 Commonwealth Games	Presenter	Gymnastics coverage
2022	Liverpool 2022 Gymnastics World Championships	Presenter	Studio Presentation & Commentator
2023	Matt Baker's Travels in the Country: USA	Presenter	More 4
2024–	Our Dream Farm with Matt Baker	Host	Channel 4
2025	Matt Baker's British Isles	Presenter	More 4
2026	Our Barn in the Dales	Presenter	More 4

Guest appearances

- A Song for Europe (2003)
- Never Mind the Buzzcocks (2007)
- Through the Keyhole (2007)
- The Wright Stuff (2007, 2008)
- Richard & Judy (2007)
- What Are You Like? (2008)
- The Paul O'Grady Show (2009)
- Pointless Celebrities (2011)
- W1A (2015)
- Strictly The Best (2018)
- Blue Peter 60th Anniversary (2018)
- Top Gear (2019)

== See also ==
- List of Blue Peter presenters
- List of Strictly Come Dancing contestants
