= Take On the Twisters =

British game show

- Genre: Game show
- Created by: Josephine Brassey; Liz Gaskell; Chris Greenwood; John Lomax
- Directed by: Ian Hamilton
- Presented by: Julia Bradbury
- Theme music composer: Will Slater
- Country of origin: United Kingdom
- Original language: English
- No. of series: 1
- No. of episodes: 30

Production
- Executive producers: Andy Culpin; Michael Mannes; Matt Walton
- Producer: Stefan Iriarte
- Production location: The London Studios
- Running time: 60mins (inc. adverts)
- Production company: 12 Yard

Original release
- Network: ITV
- Release: 22 July – 30 August 2013

Related
- Five Minutes to a Fortune

Take On the Twisters is a British game show in which four contestants must use a combination of knowledge and skill. It was broadcast on ITV and is hosted by Julia Bradbury.

The show began airing on 22 July 2013 for a 30-episode run as a summer replacement for The Chase and finished on 30 August 2013.

== Format ==
Four new contestants compete in each episode, facing a set of eight hourglasses ("Twisters") marked in different colours. A different cash value from £300 to £1,000 is assigned to each Twister and initially kept hidden from everyone.

=== Rounds 1 to 4 ===
One contestant is asked a question and must decide whether to answer it ("stick") or pass it to the opponent of their choice ("twist"). The host then reveals three answer options, and the responding contestant chooses one. The outcome is determined as follows:

- Stick, answer correctly: Contestant chooses one Twister to light up and keeps control for the next question.
- Stick, answer incorrectly: Next contestant in line gets control.
- Twist, answer correctly: Nominated contestant lights a Twister and gets control.
- Twist, answer incorrectly: Nominating contestant lights a Twister and keeps control.

Once a total of six Twisters have been lit, they all flip and begin to run while the contestant in control answers open-ended quick-fire questions for 60 seconds. After each correct answer, they may choose to either leave all the Twisters as they are ("stick") or flip one ("twist"). Any Twisters that run out are removed from play, and the round ends immediately if all of them run out.

The time required for a Twister to run out decreases as its value increases. The value of an individual Twister is only revealed if it is brought into play and kept from running out; from that point on, the value remains visible to the contestants.

Once time expires, the values of all Twisters that have not run out are revealed (in the case of any that are not yet visible) and added to the contestant's bank. If the values of all eight Twisters are revealed, they are doubled for the remainder of the game.

A different contestant is given initial control in each round. The contestant with the highest bank total after four rounds advances to the Final Twist round for a chance to win it, while the others leave with nothing.

=== Final Twist ===
The contestant's money is secretly hidden behind one Twister, and they must answer questions for 60 seconds as in the previous rounds. Now, though, all eight Twisters are in play and the contestant must try to keep as many of them running as possible. If any Twisters are still active when time expires, the contestant is offered a chance to take £200 (later £250) for each of them and quit the game. If they turn down this offer, the location of the money is revealed; the contestant wins the entire bank if it is behind an active Twister, or nothing if it is behind one that has run out. Should all the Twisters run out before time expires, the round ends immediately and the contestant leaves with nothing.
