= Five Minutes to a Fortune =

- Genre: Game show
- Created by: Stuart Shawcross
- Presented by: Davina McCall
- Country of origin: United Kingdom
- Original language: English
- No. of series: 1 (inc. 1 celebrity)
- No. of episodes: 25 (inc. 5 celebrity)

Production
- Running time: 60 minutes (inc. adverts)
- Production company: Victory Television

Original release
- Network: Channel 4
- Release: 6 April – 5 May 2013

Related
- Take On the Twisters

Five Minutes to a Fortune was a British game show, which aired on Channel 4 from 6 April 2013 to 5 May 2013 and was hosted by Davina McCall. It offered pairs of contestants the chance to win a top prize of £50,000 (or £100,000 for celebrity specials). The show aired weekdays at 5:00pm but was unable to generate high ratings to compete with ITV's The Chase and BBC's Pointless, both of which air roughly in the same timeslot.

== Format ==
In the studio stood a 15-foot (4.6 m) hourglass filled with tokens that represented an initial prize pot of £50,000. At the start of the game, the two contestants each decided which role they would play. One was the "Game Player" and played through five rounds; the other was the "Time Keeper," responsible for deciding how much time the Game Player would have to complete each round before the prize pot began to decrease. In addition, the Time Keeper chose the category for each round. Seven vague categories were presented at the start of the game, such as Animal Lover, Couch Potato, Film/History Buff, Trivia Junkie, and Wordsmith; categories were removed from the list as they were used. The Time Keeper was given a total of five minutes to allot over the five rounds, and was advised to give more time to categories that may have posed a challenge to the Game Player.

=== Gameplay ===
In each round, the Game Player had to give five correct answers. Once the Time Keeper chose a category, an example of the specific game to be played (27 in all during the first series) was shown to both contestants, after which the Time Keeper set the time limit. Frequently, the Game Player had to respond in an unconventional manner, such as spelling the answer backwards or by using the numbers on a touch-tone telephone keypad. They might have pass as often as desired, but as there was a limited bank of questions for each round, passing too often would eventually cause the questions to cycle. The Game Player might have guessed on any question as many times as desired, but could move on to a new one only by giving the correct answer or passing. Answers to any passed questions were revealed once the round was complete.

If the Game Player reached the final 10 seconds of the time allotted by the Time Keeper, the hourglass began to flip. Once time ran out, the tokens started to drain into the lower section and the prize pot began to decrease accordingly, at a steady rate of £625 every three seconds (£12,500 per minute, thus requiring four minutes to drain the entire original prize pot). The round continued until either the Game Player gave a fifth correct answer or the hourglass had completely emptied. In the former case, the draining stopped as soon as the answer was given; in the latter case, the Game Player "crashed out," the game ended, and the contestants left with no money. If the Game Player completed the round within the allotted time, the prize pot remained intact but any extra time remaining on the clock was permanently lost.

The two contestants could not confer at any time once they had chosen their roles. Once during the game, the Time Keeper might have pressed an Emergency Stop button to halt a round if the Game Player was struggling badly. The current category was thrown out, and the Game Player played a makeup round (the "Emergency Game") using a category randomly chosen from the ones that were still in play. The Game Player had the same time limit for the Emergency Game as they had for the one stopped by the Time Keeper, but this time was not deducted from the team's overall five-minute allotment. Money drained during the stopped game was not replaced in the hourglass.

At the end of each round, the drained money was counted and removed from the hourglass, and the remainder was kept in play for the next round.

=== Final game ===
After the fifth round, the Time Keeper played one last game, choosing one of the two remaining categories (or the last one if the Emergency Stop has been used) and with no help from the Game Player. The Time Keeper was shown the heading of a list with 10 hidden answers, and the hourglass began to turn once the heading had been read aloud. (E.g. "The first 10 children's books written by Roald Dahl.") After 10 seconds of play, money began to drain at the same rate as in the previous rounds. If the Time Keeper named any five of the hidden answers before the hourglass was empty, the draining stopped and the contestants split the remaining money. If not, they left with nothing.

=== Celebrity episodes ===
Five episodes were filmed with pairs of celebrities competing on behalf of selected charities. The initial prize pot for these episodes was doubled to £100,000, and the money draining rate was also doubled to £1,250 every three seconds (£25,000 per minute).

== Production ==
The show was recorded in Studio 8 at BBC Television Centre. Contestant auditions took place in London, Cardiff, Birmingham, Manchester, Newcastle and Edinburgh.

The hourglass was the creation of Julian Healy and Scott Fleary.

== International versions ==
The French channel TF1 was the first international broadcaster to launch a local format of the show. A pilot was filmed, called Pas une seconde à perdre ! (Not a second to lose!) and was to be hosted by Estelle Denis and Gérard Vives. In this version, the hourglass would've contained €25,000 and would have premiered on the channel, at the end of January 2014.

Country	Local title	Host(s)	Network	Premiere	Top Prize
France	Pas une seconde à perdre !	Estelle Denis; Gérard Vivès	TF1	January 2014	€25,000
Russia	Пять минут minut	Darya Tarasova	RTS	30 October 2016 – 22 December 2018	руб. 50,000

== See also ==
- Take On the Twisters, another 2013 British game show based around the use of an hourglass.
