= Dinosaur Britain =

- Genre: Documentary
- Presented by: Ellie Harrison and Dean Lomax
- Narrated by: Ellie Harrison
- Composers: Nainita Desai and Malcolm Laws
- Country of origin: United Kingdom
- Original language: English
- No. of series: 1
- No. of episodes: 2

Production
- Executive producer: Dan Goldsack
- Producer: Caroline Lee
- Cinematography: Tom Pridham
- Running time: 45-46 minutes
- Production company: Maverick Television

Original release
- Network: ITV
- Release: 31 August – 1 September 2015

Dinosaur Britain is a two-part British documentary on ITV telling the story of many of the dinosaurs that once roamed Great Britain, revealing how they hunted, what they ate and how they died from the evidence revealed from their bones. Presenter Ellie Harrison teams up with young paleontologist Dean Lomax in order to depict different species of dinosaurs set to the backdrop of modern Britain.

== Episodes ==
No.	Title	Produced and directed by	Original release date
1	"Episode 1"	Gareth Johnson	31 August 2015
This episode features Baryonyx depicted wandering the halls of the British Natural History Museum before going fishing in the Thames, along with the first dinosaur to be named, Megalosaurus, as it rampages through the streets of Oxford. It then depicts the large herbivorous Iguanodon feeding among the anchronistic statues of itself at Crystal Palace, and Nuthetes, a relative of the famous Velociraptor, hunting and causing mischief in and around Stonehenge, as well as the armoured Scelidosaurus.
2	"Episode 2"	Gareth Johnson	1 September 2015
In this episode, the duo travels to the Isle of Skye and the Isle of Wight to meet Cetiosaurus and Echinodon. They meet paleontologist Darren Naish, who shows evidence for a fight between two dinosaurs, Mantellisaurus and Neovenator, and they meet Proceratosaurus, an ancestor to T. rex, as well as Dacentrurus. The episode concludes with a recent discovery that has yet to be named (now called Dracoraptor).
