= Planet Earth Live (TV series) =

- Genre: Nature documentary
- Directed by: Will Clough; Phil Jennings; James Morgan
- Presented by: Richard Hammond; Julia Bradbury
- Composer: Will Slater
- Country of origin: United Kingdom
- Original language: English
- No. of series: 1
- No. of episodes: 8

Production
- Executive producer: Tim Scoones
- Producers: Roger Webb; Stuart Armstrong; Lucinda Axelsson; Andy Chastney; Vanessa Coates
- Production locations: Kenya, United States, South Africa, Sri Lanka, Peru
- Running time: 60–70 minutes
- Production companies: BBC Natural History Unit; National Geographic Channel

Original release
- Network: BBC One
- Release: 6 May – 24 May 2012

Related
- Planet Earth

Planet Earth Live was a live-action nature documentary screened on British television. Produced by the BBC Natural History Unit and broadcast in May 2012, the programme was presented by Richard Hammond and Julia Bradbury.

== Format ==
Planet Earth Live featured real-time footage of young animals from five continents throughout the month of May. Broadcast three times per week, teams of nature experts and documentary makers monitored the activity of animals in their area, reporting back on the day's events. Animals featured included meerkats in the Kalahari Desert, American black bears in Minnesota, lions and African bush elephants in East Africa, toque macaques in Sri Lanka, gray whales off the coast of California, polar bears in Svalbard and giant otters in Peru.

The programme was shown in May 2012 on BBC One in the United Kingdom and was broadcast in 140 countries in total, making it the most ambitious global wildlife series the BBC had ever undertaken. In the US it was retitled 24/7 Wild and aired on NatGeo Wild; in South Africa, Asia, Australia, Italy, Nordic countries, New Zealand and Poland it was shown on BBC Knowledge; and in India on BBC Entertainment.

== Ratings ==
Episode No.	Airdate	Total viewers	Weekly channel ranking
1	6 May 2012	6.06m	8
2	9 May 2012	4.12m	24
3	10 May 2012	4.06m	26
4	13 May 2012	5.18m	10
5	16 May 2012	4.64m	17
6	17 May 2012	Under 4.15m	Outside top 30
7	20 May 2012	4.31m	27
8	24 May 2012	Under 3.32m	Outside top 30

== Critical reception ==
The show was criticised for the lack of live coverage, with many of the animal scenes having been pre-recorded. There were also mixed reviews with regard to the style of presenters. Some of the viewers praised the choice of Richard Hammond and Julia Bradbury as fresh and they conveyed facts in an easy-to-understand way. However, others felt that because the presenters were not wildlife experts, they were out of their depth and were therefore, inappropriate for the genre. The BBC claimed that the show has a huge viewership and only a relatively small number of complaints.
