= Loups of Dalnigap =

Coordinates: 54.99670°N 4.91870°W

Loups of Dalnigap is a waterfall of Scotland. It sits below Dalnigap House, in the South of the Lagafater Estate.

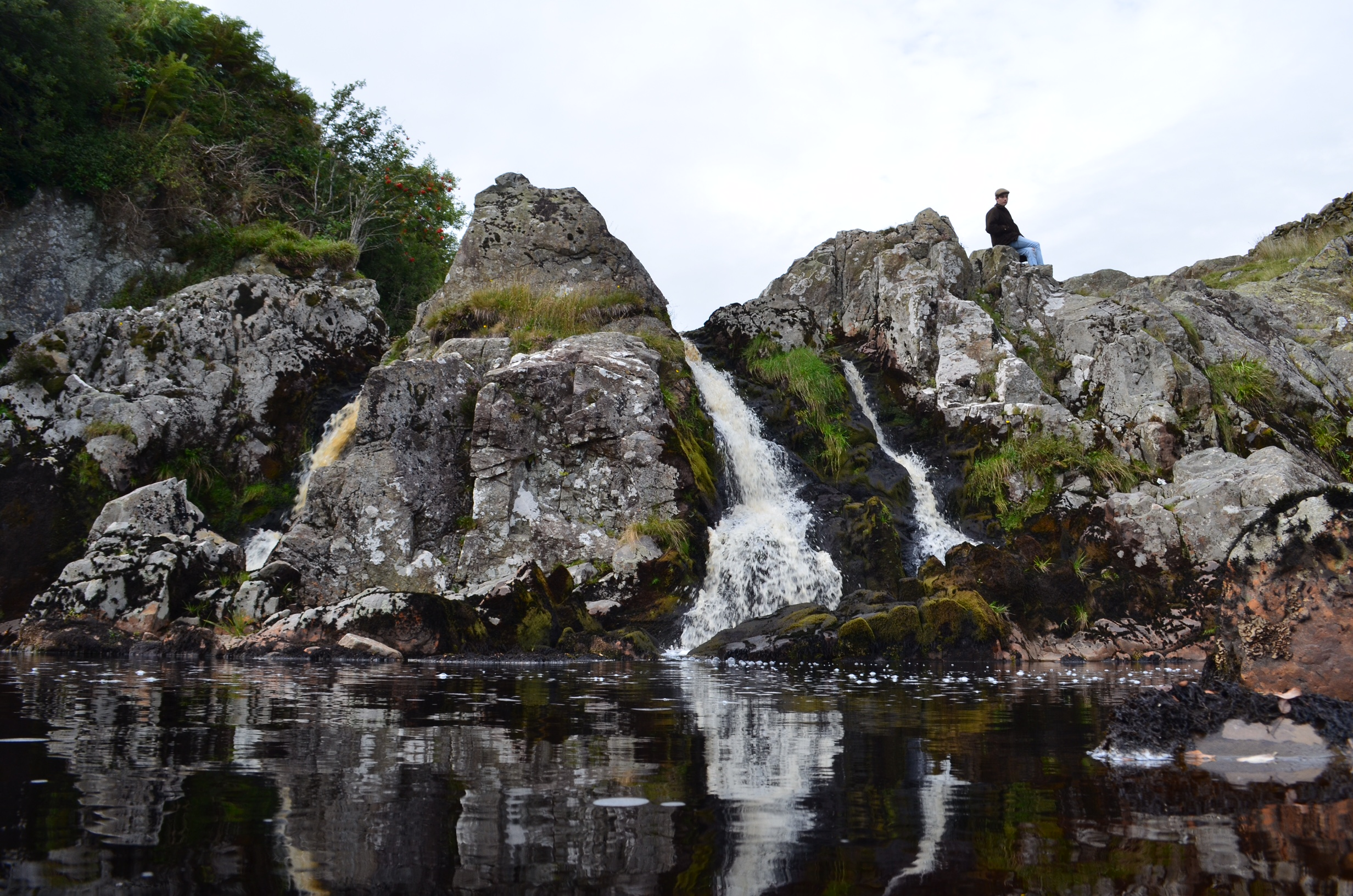
Loups of Dalnigap

== See also ==
- Waterfalls of Scotland
