= Ellie Harrison (journalist) =

English TV host

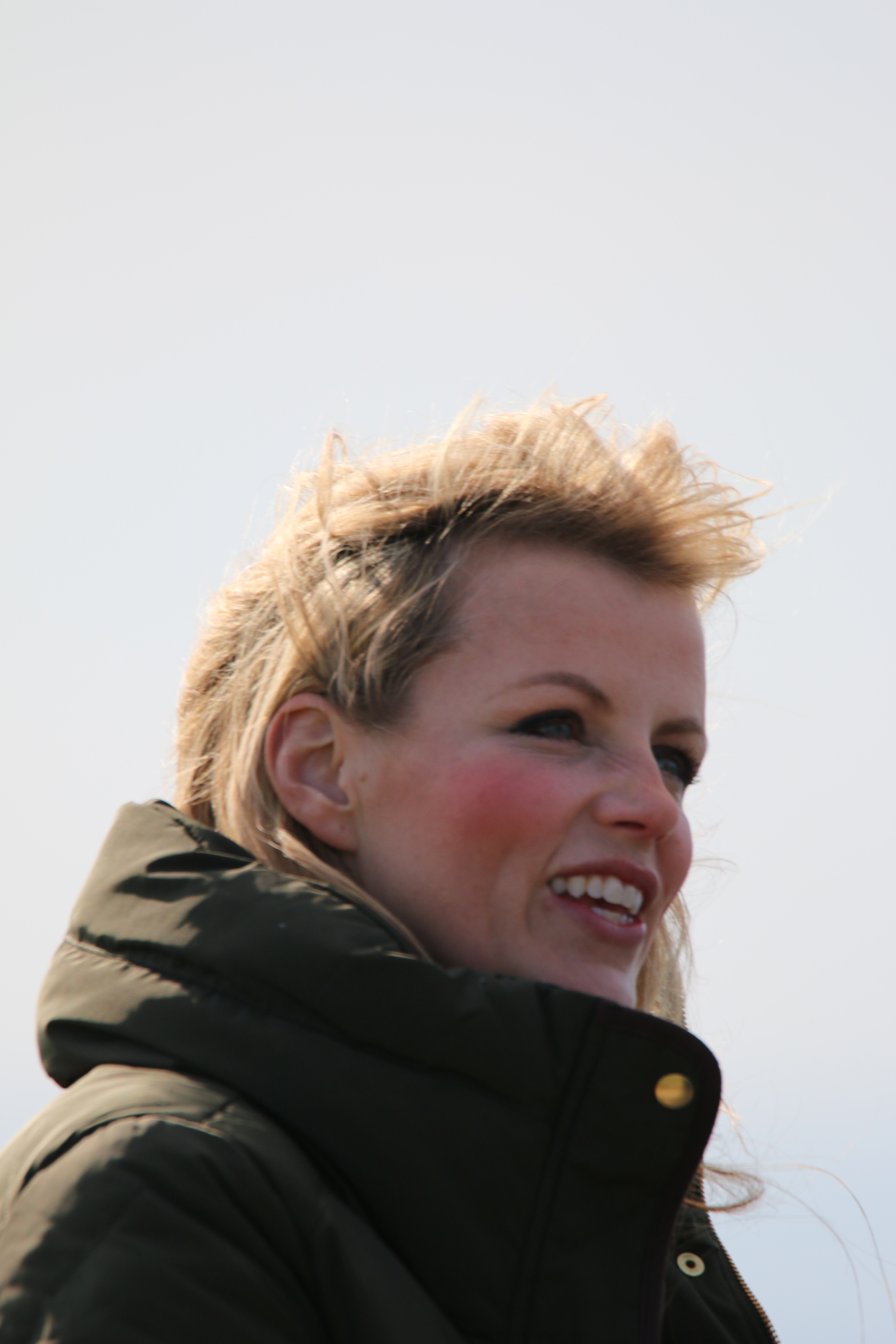
- Harrison at RSPB Bempton in 2015
- Born: Eleanor Harrison; 17 November 1977 (age 48)
- Education: Sir William Romney's School, Tetbury
- Alma mater: King's College London
- Occupation: Television presenter
- Employer: Freelance
- Known for: Countryfile; Daily Planet; Michaela's Wild Challenge; Secret Britain
- Height: 1.65 m (5 ft 5 in)
- Spouse: Matt Goodman (m. 2005)
- Children: 3

Eleanor Harrison (born 17 November 1977) is an English television presenter, best known for co-presenting Countryfile from 2009 to 2023.

== Early life ==
Born to a father who was a carpenter and a mother a midwife, Harrison grew up in rural Gloucestershire close to Cirencester, where the family grew their own fruit and vegetables and kept chickens. She was educated at Sir William Romney's School, Tetbury, and later Cirencester College for her A-levels.

While at university, she was in a relationship with Nathan Hutchings, son of actor Geoffrey Hutchings. Hutchings, who had a degree in Zoology, took Harrison to Zimbabwe to stay with contacts he had acquired from his father who previously visited the country to shoot the Clint Eastwood film White Hunter Black Heart. It was during this trip that Harrison gained her interest in wildlife. She graduated from King's College London with a degree in Ecology and Geography in 2000.

== Career ==
To support herself while exploring a career in country music, Harrison undertook a series of temporary jobs, ending up as a secretary at Channel 5. Picked from a line-up to host the children's show Milkshake!, she turned the job down, but a year later was chosen to fill in for Michaela Strachan's maternity leave, presenting Michaela's Wild Challenge for over a year, during which time the show won a children's BAFTA. Following this, she became a freelance television presenter, presenting on the BBC, ITV, Channel 4, Channel 5 and the Discovery Channel.

Harrison currently provides filmed reports or is a presenter on various TV shows, including: Countryfile, Country Tracks, The Great British Winter and The One Show for the BBC; and Daily Planet & Outrageous Acts of Science for the Discovery Channel.

In December 2014, Harrison took over as President of the Gloucestershire Wildlife Trust from Sir Henry Elwes.

From 2015 she co-presented Secret Britain on BBC One. In 2015, she presented Dinosaur Britain, a two-part documentary for ITV. In 2016, she presented Britain's Sharks and Britain's Whales, also for ITV. She appeared at Countryfile Live at Blenheim in August and Countryfile Ramble for Children in Need in Edinburgh, returning to Countryfile in November 2016 after maternity leave. In November 2017 she danced and sang as part of a special Countryfile country music routine for BBC's Children in Need.

In October 2023, after over thirteen years working on Countryfile, Harrison announced that she had left the series to spend more time with her family and to work on other projects.

== Personal life ==
Harrison and Matthew Goodman were married in 2005, and they have two daughters and a son.
