= Steve Brown (wheelchair rugby) =

Former paralympian and television presenter (born 1981)

Personal information
- Nationality: British
- Born: 2 June 1981 (age 45) Chatham, Kent, England
- Website: SteveBrownGB.com

Sport
- Sport: Wheelchair rugby
- Team: (United Kingdom) Great Britain

Achievements and titles
- Paralympic finals: Captain 2012
- Updated on 2 October 2012

Stephen Brown (born 2 June 1981) is an English television presenter, public speaker, athlete mentor and a former member and captain of the Great Britain wheelchair rugby squad.

== Early life ==
Brown was raised in a family that supported Crystal Palace Football Club and was inspired by them. He attended Borden Grammar School in Sittingbourne, Kent and represented the school in football, cricket and cross-country.

Alongside his sport, Brown's greatest pleasure was in exploring the countryside around his home. His interest was so great that he wanted to be a wildlife presenter. "If I wasn't playing football with my mates I was catching tadpoles and slowworms, and I loved programmes like The Really Wild Show and everything with David Attenborough. So that’s what I wanted to be. But the careers master just told me I wouldn't be able to do that and to forget it."

== Injury and recovery ==
At the age of 23, Brown fell from a first-floor balcony while working in Germany as an area manager for a holiday company. He recounts: "I tripped and fell from a first-floor balcony. I was looking up when I landed, so when my body stopped my head went back over my shoulders, like a severe whiplash. It snapped my neck, dislocating the C7 [one of the cervical vertebrae, below the skull] and trapping my spinal cord." Soon after arriving at Stoke Mandeville Hospital, Brown was taken to watch wheelchair rugby.

== Wheelchair rugby ==
Brown's potential in wheelchair rugby was noted by the head coach of the Great Britain squad. In 2006, he gained a place in that squad and in 2007 was a member of the team which won gold in the IWRF European Championships.

Brown was not selected for the 2008 Beijing Paralympic Games however, he led the Olympic and Paralympic Parade of the Heroes through London on the team's return. In 2010, Brown broke his sternum while playing in Germany. In 2011, Brown became captain of team, leading them to a fifth place finish in the London 2012 Paralympics. He has since commented that “Being captain at your home Games is the biggest thing that you could do. I was incredibly proud.”

After the London 2012 Paralympics, Brown retired from playing international wheelchair rugby. However he remains involved in the sport as a player and the head coach for Canterbury Hellfire Wheelchair Rugby Club. He is one of the most recognised faces in the sport, having featured in national newspapers and television broadcasts including Channel 4's Inside Incredible Athletes.

== Television ==
Since 2012, Brown has worked in television broadcasting as a presenter and reporter. He has presented on the BBC's Truth or Scare, The One Show and Springwatch, and has been a roving reporter for Game Changers on Sky Sports.

From 12 to 16 October 2015, was a presenter for the ITV live broadcast of the BT World Wheelchair Rugby Challenge at the Copper Box Arena, Queen Elizabeth Olympic Park, London. He co-presented with Martin Bayfield, the former England and British & Irish Lions rugby union player.

Brown worked as a reporter and commentator for the BBC's coverage of the Invictus Games in 2014, 2016 and 2017. He has described this work as "the privilege of watching people bond and go from being individuals with things in common to being part of a team." In September 2016, he was a member of the Channel 4 team that covered the Rio 2016 Paralympic Games.

In April 2017, Brown joined the BBC's Countryfile team. For him this was the realisation of a long-held ambition and a refutation of the careers advisor at school who told him that he would never be a wildlife presenter. He remarked that "[i]t is worth every flat tyre, every muddy set of hands, every wet lap… I want to be judged on my performance. I'm hoping people will see it's about ability, not disability.” He has presented Escape to the Country as well as Escape to the Perfect Town, a spin-off from Escape to the Country.

== Other work ==
Brown is a Sky Sports Scholar and a Sky Sports 'Living for Sport' mentor. He is a public speaker and has spoken for organisations including Allianz and Sky. His charitable work includes being an ambassador for Wooden Spoon, a patron of Panathlon and a trustee for the Swale Youth Development Fund.
