= Pump It Up (game show) =

British children's game show

- Presented by: Andy Collins; Julia Bradbury; Fearne Cotton
- Narrated by: Richard Webb
- Country of origin: United Kingdom
- Original language: English
- No. of series: 2
- No. of episodes: 26

Production
- Producer: Carlton Television
- Running time: 25 minutes

Original release
- Network: ITV (CITV)
- Release: 26 February 1999 – 31 March 2000

Pump It Up is a British game show for children produced by Carlton Television, broadcast on CITV from 26 February 1999 to 31 March 2000. Andy Collins was the host and was joined by Julia Bradbury in the first series and Fearne Cotton in the second series. Richard Webb provided voiceovers.

== Series overview ==
Series	Episodes	First aired	last aired
1	13	26 February 1999	30 April 1999
2	13	7 January 2000	31 March 2000
