= Julia Bradbury =

English television presenter (born 1970)

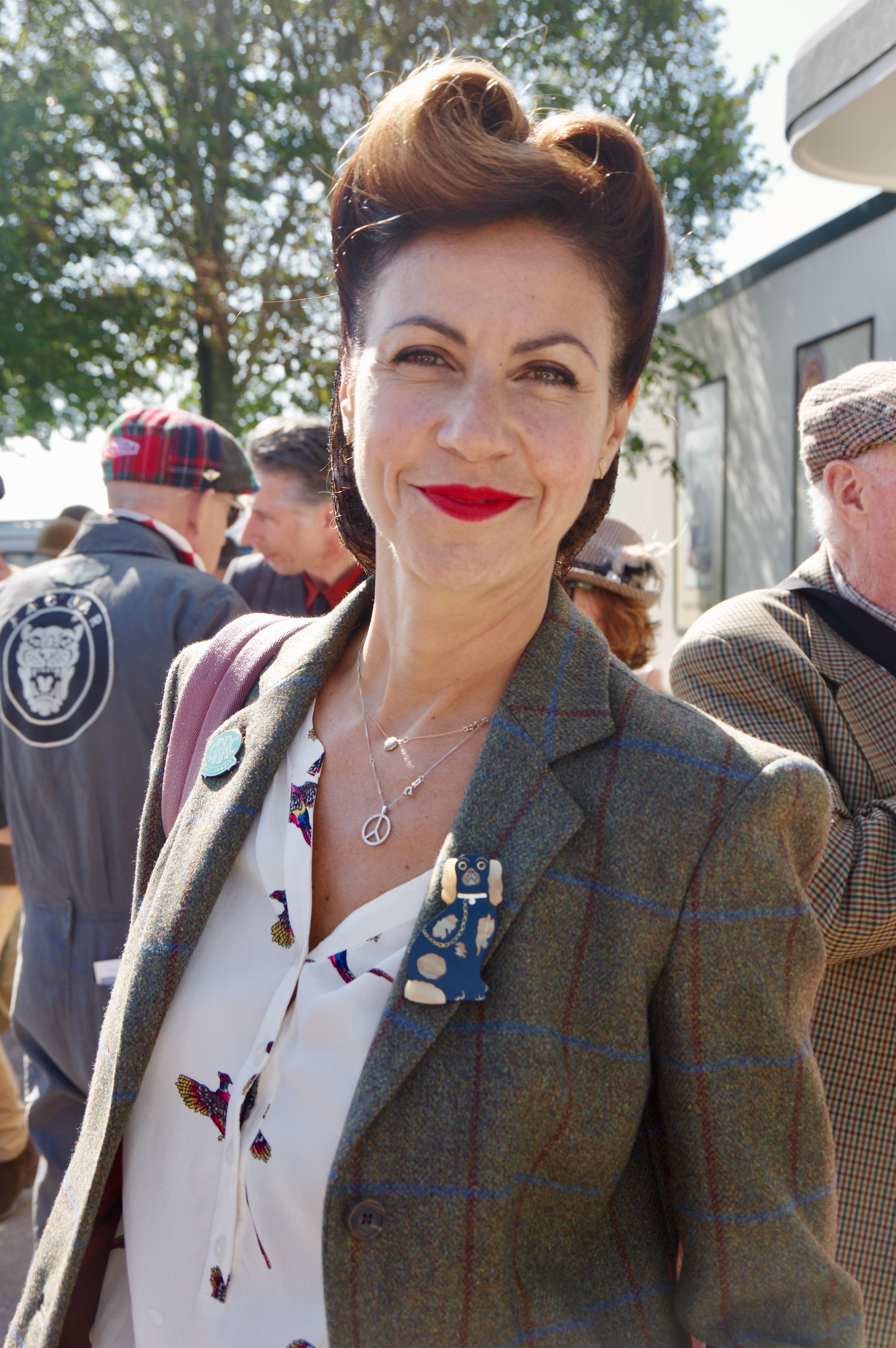
- Bradbury at the Goodwood Revival in 2019
- Born: Julia Michele Bradbury; 24 July 1970 (age 56); Dublin, Ireland
- Occupations: Journalist; television presenter
- Employers: ITV (current); BBC (former)
- Notable credits: Watchdog (2005–2009); Countryfile (2009–2014); Take on the Twisters (2013); Fightback Britain (2013); Mystery Map (2013); Keeping Britain Safe 24/7 (2013–2014); The Wonder of Britain (2015); Best Walks with a View (2016); Famous, Rich and Homeless (2016); Britain's Best Walks (2017)
- Partner: Gerard Cunningham
- Children: 3
- Website: juliabradbury.com

Julia Michele Bradbury (born 24 July 1970) is an English journalist and television presenter, employed by the BBC and ITV, specialising in documentaries and consumer affairs.

She is best known for presenting a series of outdoor walking programmes across multiple TV channels in addition to co-presenting the BBC One programme Countryfile with Matt Baker from 2004 until 2014. She also presented Watchdog (2005–2009) and Planet Earth Live (2012) for the BBC and Take on the Twisters (2013), The Wonder of Britain (2015) and Britain's Best Walks (2017) for ITV.

She has a website called The Outdoor Guide, which is run by her sister Gina. In 2021, they launched The Outdoor Guide Foundation, raising money to donate outdoor kit to state primary schools and make the outdoors more accessible to all.

== Early life ==
Bradbury's father Michael Bradbury, a Derbyshire-born, steel and engineering industry marketing director and Greek mother were in the Republic of Ireland when Bradbury was born. The family returned to Britain, where she grew up in an old rectory in Edith Weston, Rutland, where she attended primary school, followed by King Edward VII School in Sheffield, where her father worked for British Steel Corporation and her mother ran a fashion business. Bradbury attended acting classes, and took part as a child in the Crucible Theatre's stage production of Peter Pan, starring Joanne Whalley and Paula Wilcox.

== Career ==
=== Early career ===
Bradbury started as a television presenter with Chrysalis TV, followed by L!VE TV, before making the transition in 1996 from cable TV to terrestrial with GMTV as its Los Angeles correspondent. Bradbury also worked as a co-host on Top Gear during the 1990s.

Alongside Tim Vine, Bradbury was the first presenter on Channel 5 when the channel launched on 30 March 1997 with a countdown from the Spice Girls.

=== BBC ===
Bradbury and co-host Arkin Salih hosted the BBC's Are We Being Served?, which examined customer service in the UK and ran for six programmes in the summer of 2006. The show later received strong criticism from comedian Lee Mack when he named it as "the most evil programme ever made" during his appearance on the tongue-in-cheek comedy showTV Heaven, Telly Hell.

From 2008 to 2011, Bradbury presented four series of Kill It, Cook It, Eat It on BBC Three. The first series concentrated on commercially farmed animals such as chickens, pigs, sheep and cattle. The second series featured hunted wild game such as ducks, rabbits, deer and grouse. The third series focused on fast food; a group of six people went through the process of killing, cooking and eating animals. The fourth series focused on how animal products from the first series are used outside of the meat trade. Bradbury was joined by young consumers to uncover the animal origins of many of western society's favourite things as body parts were transformed from abattoir to shop display.

From 2 March 2009, Bradbury temporarily stepped down from BBC One's Watchdog following allegations in the press concerning irregularities in her Virgin Atlantic frequent flyer account. Anita Rani stepped in to co-present the show with Nicky Campbell. On 15 April 2009, Bradbury was cleared of any wrongdoing in the investigation, and it was confirmed that she would return to present Watchdog, which she did on 20 April 2009. It was incorrectly reported in several newspapers at the time that Bradbury had to repay £20,000 worth of Air Miles – in fact her account (and several others) had been tampered with by an employee who was later arrested and charged. In April 2009, it was announced that Bradbury would present the relaunched primetime Countryfile with Matt Baker. Anne Robinson returned to Watchdog after an eight-year absence.

In August 2007, Bradbury presented Ultimate Britain – Climbing on BBC One, with rock climber Tim Emmett. Bradbury's lifetime ambition to be a "real" rock climber was achieved when the pair successfully ascended Cornwall's Commando Ridge, Crackstone Rib in the Llanberis Pass, and the Old Man of Stoer.

That year, Bradbury also presented Wainwright Walks on BBC Four, in which she followed the mountain routes of the renowned fell walker and guidebook author Alfred Wainwright. The series was later repeated on BBC Two and ran for two series. Her appearance in this and the Railway Walks series earned her the title of "Walking Man's Totty". On 20 July 2009 her series Coast to Coast started on BBC Two.

In 2010, Bradbury went to South Africa and embarked on a series of South Africa Walks as part of South Africa season for the BBC during the 2010 World Cup.

In December 2010, she presented another walking-themed series, Julia Bradbury's German Wanderlust on BBC Four in which she explored Germany and its Romantic movement through a series of walks across the country. The series was repeated on BBC Two in January and February 2011. In May 2011, she presented Canal Walks with Julia Bradbury.

Another walking programme, Julia Bradbury's Icelandic Walk, aired on 11 May 2011 on BBC Four. Her challenge was to walk the 60 kilometres of Iceland's most famous hiking route, which includes the newest hills on Earth. This route ends at Eyjafjallajökull, the volcano whose copious eruptions of volcanic ash brought air traffic across Europe to a standstill in April 2010. She also presented a new series in May 2011, following the routes of some of the UK's canals.

From November to December 2011, Bradbury presented a series called That's Britain! with Nick Knowles, focusing on the good, the bad and the ugly in Britain. She presented with Hugh Dennis a four-part BBC One documentary series The Great British Countryside, which began in February 2012. She has co-presented (with Richard Hammond) a programme about the wildlife of different countries called Planet Earth Live in 2012, which has aired on BBC One.

In 2013, Bradbury co-presented the BBC One show Fightback Britain with Adrian Simpson and the BBC One show Keeping Britain Safe 24/7 with Matt Allwright.

On 3 March 2014, it was announced that Bradbury would be leaving Countryfile and the BBC completely later in the year before joining ITV full-time after doing odd jobs for them in the past. In 2016, she took part in the third series of Sport Relief's Famous, Rich and Homeless programme.

=== ITV ===
She presented Wish You Were Here...? for ITV.

In 2013, Bradbury co-presented the two-part ITV series Mystery Map with Ben Shephard. In the same year, she presented teatime quiz show Take On the Twisters, a summer replacement for The Chase.

In 2015, Bradbury presented an ITV primetime series called The Wonder of Britain.

In 2016, Bradbury began presenting her own eight-part ITV series Best Walks with a View with Julia Bradbury. A book, Unforgettable Walks, was published alongside the series.

Beginning in January 2017, Bradbury presented Britain's Best Walks for ITV. In 2018, she co-presented a one-off programme called Britain's Favourite Walks: Top 100, as voted for by the public. Ore Oduba co-presented.

In 2019, she presented Australia with Julia Bradbury and My £10K Holiday Home, a new primetime ITV series. In Episode 4 of Australia with Julia Bradbury she said "You won't find that on Wikipedia" when told by indigenous Australian Neville Poelina that putting a vegetable or fruit under one's armpit is a good way to find out whether or not it's safe to eat.

On 10 January 2020, she presented the first of a new ITV series entitled The Greek Islands with Julia Bradbury.

The three-part ITV series Julia Bradbury’s Wonders of the Frozen South; documenting her 23-day journey through the Southern Ocean will air in early 2026.

=== Channel 5 ===
From 1997, she anchored Exclusive! for Five (now Channel 5). With Tim Vine, she presented the launch of Channel 5 in 1997.

=== Radio ===
Bradbury has also presented on radio for BBC London 94.9, and Radio 5 Live. She crossed NUJ picket lines to present Radio 5 Live's breakfast programme on 15 July 2011. She presented the programme with Ian Payne who also broke the strike.

=== Books ===
- Julia Bradbury's Railway Walks (7 October 2010)
- Canal Walks (3 March 2011)
- Julia Bradbury's Wainwright Walks (1 November 2012)
- Julia Bradbury's Wainwright Walks: Coast to Coast (20 March 2013)
- Unforgettable Walks (9 February 2017)
- Walk Yourself Happy (14 September 2023)
- Hack Yourself Healthy (4 September 2025)

== Personal life ==
Bradbury lives in Rutland and Notting Hill, West London. In summer 2006, Bradbury was treated for endometriosis. Her long-time partner Gerard Cunningham works in property and the couple have a son and twin daughters. Bradbury was diagnosed with breast cancer, and in 2021 had a single mastectomy to remove a 6 cm tumour.

Bradbury is an ambassador for several charities, including the Pink Ribbon Foundation, The Outdoor Guide Foundation, Bowel & Prostate Cancer, and Keep Britain Tidy.

In 2009, she competed in the Macmillan 4x4 UK Challenge with her sister, Gina Fox, raising £7,000 towards the £105,000 raised for Macmillan Cancer Support. Later that year, she travelled from Kazakhstan to Mongolia with Countryfile co-star Matt Baker in the BBC's Around the World in 80 Days in aid of Children in Need.

Bradbury was president of the Friends of the Peak District from 2008 until 2016 (remaining as a vice-president) and she is vice-president of the CPRE in South Yorkshire. In April 2010, she became president of the Ramblers.

Bradbury works with the British Heart Foundation to encourage people to exercise more. She is an ambassador for The Scout Association.

In October 2013, she became president of the Camping and Caravanning Club. This made her the first woman to hold the post.

== Awards and honours ==
On 14 November 2013, Bradbury was awarded an honorary doctorate by Sheffield Hallam University.

== Filmography ==
=== Television ===
Year	Title	Channel	Role
1997–1998	Exclusive	5	Main presenter
1999	Pump It Up	CITV	Co-presenter
2005–2009	Watchdog	BBC One	Co-presenter
2006	Are We Being Served?	BBC	Co-presenter
2007	Wainwright Walks	BBC Four	Presenter
2008	Rough Guide To...	5	Co-presenter
2008–2011	Kill It, Cook It, Eat It	BBC Three	Presenter
2009–2014	Countryfile	BBC One	Co-presenter
2010	Railway Walks With Julia Bradbury	BBC One	Presenter
2011	That's Britain!	BBC One	Co-presenter
2012	The Great British Countryside	BBC One	Co-presenter
2012	Planet Earth Live	BBC One	Co-presenter
2013	Take On the Twisters	ITV	Presenter
2013	Mystery Map	ITV	Co-presenter
2013	Fightback Britain	BBC One	Co-presenter
2013	The One Show	BBC One	Stand-in presenter
2013	Keeping Britain Safe 24/7	BBC One	Co-presenter
2015	The Wonder of Britain	ITV	Presenter
2016	Best Walks with a View with Julia Bradbury	ITV	Presenter
2016	Famous, Rich and Homeless	BBC One	Participant
2017	Britain's Best Walks with Julia Bradbury	ITV	Presenter
2018	Britain's Favourite Walks: Top 100	ITV	Co-presenter
2018	My £10K Holiday Home	ITV	Presenter
2019	Australia with Julia Bradbury	ITV	Presenter
2020	The Greek Islands with Julia Bradbury	ITV	Presenter
2020–2021	For the Love of Britain	ITV	Co-presenter
2021	Cornwall and Devon Walks with Julia Bradbury	ITV	Presenter
2021	Orkney: Britain's Green Islands with Julia Bradbury and Alex Beresford	ITV	Co-presenter
2022	Julia Bradbury: Breast Cancer and Me	ITV	Presenter
2023	Julia Bradbury's Irish Journey	Channel4	Presenter
2023	The Real Full Monty	ITV	Participant
2024	Warship: Life in the Royal Navy	Channel 5	Co-presenter
2025	Today at the Great Yorkshire Show 2025	5	Co-presenter

=== Guest appearances ===
- Just the Two of Us (2007) – Contestant
- Celebrity Come Dine with Me (2009) – Contestant
- Around the World in 80 Days (2009) – Participant
- The Paul O'Grady Show (2009, 2013) – Guest
- The Magicians (2011) – Guest
- The Alan Titchmarsh Show (2011, 2012, 2013) – Guest
- Daybreak (2013) – Guest
- The Agenda (2013, 2014, 2016) – Guest
- Loose Women (2013) – Guest
- Lorraine (2013, 2015, 2016, 2017) – Guest
- Sunday Brunch (2013, 2016) – Guest
- Countdown (2014) – "Dictionary Corner" guest
- This Morning (2015) – Guest
- The Saturday Show (2016) – Guest
- The One Show (2016, 2018) – Guest
- Good Morning Britain (2016, 2018) – Guest
- The Superhumans Show (2016) – Guest

=== DVDs ===
- Wainwright Walks Series 1 – presented by Julia Bradbury (2007)
- Wainwright Walks Series 2 – presented by Julia Bradbury (2008)
- Julia Bradbury's Railway Walks (2009)
- Wainwright Walks: Coast to Coast (2009)
- The Julia Bradbury Collection (2009)
- German Wanderlust with Julia Bradbury (2010)
- South Africa Walks (2010)
- Julia Bradbury's Canal Walks (2011)
- Best Walks with a View with Julia Bradbury (2016)
- Britain's Best Walks with Julia Bradbury (2017)
