= Costing the Earth =

- Genre: Factual
- Running time: 30 minutes
- Country of origin: United Kingdom
- Language(s): English
- Edited by: Dimitri Houtart
- Narrated by: Tom Heap
- Original release: 27 April 2007
- Website: Official BBC page
- Podcast: BBC Episode Listing

Costing the Earth is a factual programme on BBC Radio 4 about the environment. The show has been broadcast since 2007 and is also available to download as a podcast.

The programme is produced by the Radio 4 team based in Bristol.

== Presenters ==
The show is currently presented by Tom Heap, with some episodes narrated and hosted by other presenters depending on topic and location.

The founding presenter of the programme was future BBC Environment Analyst Roger Harrabin. Other presenters include former BBC Environment Correspondent Alex Kirby, Professor Alice Roberts and Miranda Krestovnikoff.

== Episodes ==
The programme takes a look at the impact of humans effect on the environment and how the environment reacts, questioning accepted truths, challenging those in charge and reporting on progress towards improving the world.

A variety of topics gets discussed on the programme, some of which may be on little discussed issues - for example, the programme broadcast on 5 February 2013 discussed the use of robots in farming. More widely discussed topics, such as the Common Fisheries Policy are also tackled.

The majority of episodes are presented in the format of introducing the topic, then interviewing experts and interested parties in locations around the United Kingdom and rest of the world, relating to the premise of the episode. However, some topics are also presented as a panel discussion in which multiple experts put their views across with the host posing questions of each guest.

Notably the series worked with BBC2's Newsnight programme and the BBC World Channel's Our World to produce a special report on Africa's Energy Revolution.

== Broadcasts ==
Episodes are broadcast on BBC Radio 4 each Tuesday at 15:30 and Wednesday at 21:00. They are usually broadcast in series blocks twice a year during spring and autumn. Special episodes are also occasionally produced and broadcast.
