= Charlotte Smith (broadcaster) =

British journalist and radio presenter

Charlotte Victoria Smith (born 1964) is one of two main presenters of BBC Radio 4's Farming Today.

== Early life ==
Smith was born in 1964 and grew up in Quorn, Leicestershire, and has a brother. She attended Loughborough High School, where she was head girl. She studied English and Drama at the University of Kent from 1983–86.

She volunteered on BBC Radio Leicester.

== Career ==
Smith was put on the BBC's Local Radio Reporters Scheme, then toured the local radio stations of Sussex, Cumbria and Devon. She then returned to Radio Leicester as a news reporter. At Radio Leicester she worked with Julian Worricker, who would later become her colleague at BBC Radio 4.

She worked on BBC national radio, on The World Tonight. More locally to Leicestershire, she became a reporter and sports presenter on East Midlands Today. Returning to national radio on BBC Radio 5 Live, she was a producer, reporter and presenter.

Prior to Farming Today Smith worked as a reporter for You and Yours, the lunch-time consumer programme on Radio 4. She has also since been a television reporter on BBC1's Countryfile, until 2009, and returned as an occasional relief reporter from 2014.

== Personal life ==
She lives in London with her husband, Mike, and has two children. She was diagnosed with Lymphangioleiomyomatosis in 2010.
