= Spicer baronets =

Baronetcy in the Baronetage of the United Kingdom

Escutcheon of the Spicer baronets of Lancaster Gate

The Spicer Baronetcy, of Lancaster Gate in the Borough of Paddington, is a title in the Baronetage of the United Kingdom. It was created on 17 July 1906 for Albert Spicer. He was Chairman of James Spicer & Sons Ltd (since 1922 ″Spicers Ltd″), paper makers, and also represented Monmouth and Hackney Central in the House of Commons as a Liberal. The fourth Baronet did not use his title.

== Spicer baronets, of Lancaster Gate (1906) ==
- Sir Albert Spicer, 1st Baronet (1847–1934)
- Sir Albert Dykes Spicer, 2nd Baronet (1880–1966)
- Sir Stewart Dykes Spicer, 3rd Baronet (1888–1968)
- Peter James Spicer, presumed 4th Baronet (1921–1993). Did not use the title.
- Sir Nicholas Adrian Albert Spicer, 5th Baronet (born 1953)

Baronetage of the United Kingdom
Preceded by Schwann baronets	Spicer baronets of Lancaster Gate; 17 July 1906	Succeeded by Johnson-Ferguson baronets
