= Countryfile =

British television news programme

- Genre: News magazine
- Presented by: Matt Baker; John Craven; Adam Henson; Ellie Harrison; Helen Skelton; Paul Martin; Tom Heap; Margherita Taylor; Naomi Wilkinson; Steve Brown; Sammi Kinghorn; Anita Rani; Charlotte Smith; Sean Fletcher; Vick Hope
- Theme music composer: David Lowe
- Country of origin: United Kingdom
- Original language: English

Production
- Executive producer: William Lyons
- Running time: 60 minutes
- Production company: BBC Studios Factual Entertainment Productions

Original release
- Network: BBC One
- Release: 24 July 1988 – present

Related
- Landward

Countryfile is a British television programme which reports on rural, agricultural, and environmental issues. It airs weekly on BBC One.

The programme is currently presented by John Craven, Adam Henson, Matt Baker, Tom Heap, Ellie Harrison, Paul Martin, Helen Skelton, Charlotte Smith, Steve Brown, Sean Fletcher, Anita Rani and Sammi Kinghorn.

== History ==
The show was first broadcast on 24 July 1988 as Country File. While farming remained a core ingredient, the programme held a much broader brief—to investigate rural issues and celebrate the beauty and diversity of the British countryside.

Anne Brown, Ian Breach, Roger Tabor, Chris Baines and Caroline Hall fronted the programme for its first year under its original producer Mike Fitzgerald. The programme was modelled on a regional BBC magazine series called "Your Country Needs You", presented by Chris Baines, directed by Ann Brown and produced by Mike Fitzgerald.

Broadcaster John Craven started fronting the Sunday morning programme in 1989. The programme was originally 30 minutes in length. Craven is currently the longest-serving Countryfile presenter.

In 2001, Adam Henson joined the team as co-presenter.

In April 2009, Countryfile moved to an early Sunday evening slot, with Matt Baker and Julia Bradbury joining Craven as co-presenters. Tom Heap and Ellie Harrison also joined in 2009. In 2014, Helen Skelton became a presenter and in 2015, Anita Rani joined the programme. In 2023, Sammi Kinghorn joined the programme.

The programme currently airs 52 weeks of the year and includes a five-day weather forecast live from the BBC's weather studio in London.

Countryfile was originally produced by BBC Birmingham, moving to BBC Bristol in 2012.

== Overview ==
Episodes are typically centred on two lead presenters visiting a place or region, and uncovering the stories, characters and traditions which make that area distinctive. Typical subject matter includes wildlife, conservation, farming and food production, the arts, countryside crafts, social history and leisure activities. Presenters and guests are often wearing British country clothing, episodes may include several segments with other presenters, uncovering other stories in the region. Compilation programmes occasionally air with a thematic focus, with a reduced number of original segments typically featuring one lead presenter only, and several other segments repeated from previous shows.

Journalism remains an integral part of the programme's agenda. BBC News's Rural Affairs Correspondent Tom Heap, Charlotte Smith or John Craven presents a weekly investigation into the big issues affecting the British countryside. Recent examples include the impact of animal diseases, the move towards renewable energy, environmental disasters, threats to rural services as well as changes to farming policy and practices.

Farmer Adam Henson joined the programme in 2001 following a search to find a new presenter amongst programme viewers. In 2009 he started fronting the weekly "Adam's Farm" strand which gives viewers an insight into the challenges of running a mixed farm in the Cotswolds. His father, Joe Henson, was one of the original founders of the Rare Breeds Survival Trust.

In 2013 the programme marked its 25th anniversary with a special edition guest-edited by The Prince of Wales. Countryfile: A Royal Appointment saw the team joining the Prince on his Gloucestershire farm where he shared his passion for the British countryside, rare breed animals, organic farming and hedge-laying. Countryfile also accompanied him on a trip to County Durham to find out what was being done to help struggling hill farmers, before heading to a London comprehensive where pupils were growing and cooking their own food. The Silver Jubilee celebrations continued well into July when 250 viewers were invited to a traditional summer fayre held on Henson's farm. The anniversary was marked by a new title sequence and re-versioned music composed by David Lowe.

October 2013 also saw the programme uniting with another BBC institution. Ireland went on to win Countryfile's One Man and His Dog, which was broadcast on 27 October.

=== Magazine ===
The BBC's Countryfile magazine was launched in 2007 and is now published by Our Media. As of January 2018, the editor is Fergus Collins.

=== Photographic competition ===
The Countryfile Photographic Competition remains a highlight of the programme's year. Viewers are invited to submit entries and the best make up a wall calendar sold in aid of Children in Need. The 2017 calendar raised over £2.2 million for the charity.

=== Spin-off programmes ===
Year	Name	Presenters	Notes
2009–2012	Country Tracks	Joe Crowley; Helen Skelton; Ellie Harrison; Liz Bonnin; Mark Beaumont; Jodie Kidd; Ben Fogle	
2010, 2015–2016	Secret Britain	Matt Baker (2010); Julia Bradbury (2010); Ellie Harrison (2015–2016); Adam Henson (2015); Denise Lewis (2016); Chris Hollins (2016)	
2016—	Countryfile: Spring Diaries	John Craven; Keeley Donovan; Jules Hudson; Margherita Taylor; Paul Martin Steve Brown	
2016—	Countryfile: Summer Diaries	John Craven; Keeley Donovan; Jules Hudson; Margherita Taylor; Paul Martin Steve Brown	
2016—	Countryfile: Autumn Diaries	John Craven; Keeley Donovan; Jules Hudson; Margherita Taylor; Paul Martin Steve Brown	
2017—	Countryfile: Winter Diaries	John Craven; Keeley Donovan; Jules Hudson; Margherita Taylor; Paul Martin Steve Brown	

== Ageism case ==
In November 2010, the BBC faced an employment tribunal following allegations of sexism and ageism brought against the corporation by ex-reporter, Miriam O'Reilly. O'Reilly sued the BBC due to the allegations following her dismissal from the programme in 2009, along with other female reporters, Michaela Strachan, Juliet Morris and Charlotte Smith. Former BBC One controller Jay Hunt told the tribunal the claims were "entirely and categorically untrue" as well as "profoundly distressing and utterly offensive", arguing that the only reason for O'Reilly's departure was because she was not recognisable to a peak time audience.

On 11 January 2011, the employment tribunal found in favour of O'Reilly's claims on the grounds of ageism and victimisation, but not sexism. The BBC accepted the tribunal's findings after what O'Reilly described as "an incredibly stressful 14 months."

== On-air team ==
=== Main presenters ===
- John Craven (1989—)
- Adam Henson (2001—)
- Matt Baker (2009—)
- Tom Heap (2009—)
- Helen Skelton (2014—)
- Anita Rani (2015—)
- Sean Fletcher (2015—)
- Vick Hope (2025—)

=== Reporters, relief presenters and co-presenters ===
- Charlotte Smith (1998–2009, 2014—)
- Jules Hudson (2009—)
- James Wong (2009—)
- Joe Crowley (2014—)
- Naomi Wilkinson (2015—)
- Steve Brown (2017—)
- Margherita Taylor

=== Former presenters ===
- Ellie Harrison (2010—2023)
- Clare Balding (2011–2012)
- Julia Bradbury (2004–2014)
- Chris Baines (1988–1992)
- Anne Brown (1988–1989)
- Ian Breach
- Michael Collie (1989–1995)
- Ben Fogle (2001–2009, 2014–2015)
- Caroline Hall (1988-1989)
- Joe Henson (–2015)
- Shiulie Ghosh (1993–1995)
- Katie Knapman (2009–2013)
- Juliet Morris (until 2009)
- Miriam O'Reilly (until 2009)
- Rupert Segar (1990)
- Michaela Strachan (1999–2009)
- Roger Tabor (1988–1989)

== International broadcast ==
Countryfile started airing on BBC Knowledge New Zealand in early 2016.

== See also ==
- Countrywise
- Landline (similar Australian programme broadcast on ABC Television)
