= Freak Like Me (disambiguation) =

"Freak Like Me" is a 1995 single by Adina Howard, also remixed by Tru Faith & Dub Conspiracy and covered by Sugababes.

Freak Like Me may also refer to:

- Freak Like Me (TV series), 2010 reality series on BBC Three
- "Freak Like Me" (Halestorm song), 2013
- "Freak Like Me", a song by Brook Candy on the album Sexorcism
- "Freak Like Me", a song by Night Club on their 2016 album Requiem for Romance
- Freak Like Me, a book by the Jim Rose Circus
