= Knickerbockerglory (production company) =

British television production company

- Industry: TV Production
- Founded: February 28, 2011; 15 years ago in United Kingdom
- Founder: Jonathan Stadlen
- Headquarters: Shepherd's Bush, London, England
- Products: Boom Town; Stage School
- Website: https://www.knickerbockerglory.tv/

Knickerbockerglory is a television production company based in the UK.

== History ==
The production company was founded in 2011 by Jonathan Stadlen. Stadlen and other founding producers had worked on the Pineapple Dance Studios TV series which was cancelled about 2010 though recognised with a BAFTA nomination in 2011. Knickerbockerglory claims to be the first production company to share its profits with its production teams.

== Productions ==
The list of programmes and series produced by Knickerbockerglory include:

Programme	Genre	Original network	First broadcast
Boom Town	comedy sketch	BBC3	2013
GPs: Behind Closed Doors	factual	Channel 5	2014
In Therapy	reality tv	Channel 5	2015
Lookalikes	reality tv	Channel 4	2015
Me & My ...	documentary	Channel 5	2016
South Side Story	structured reality	BBC3	2015
Stage School	factual	E4	2016
