= Russell Kane =

English writer, comedian, and actor (born 1975)

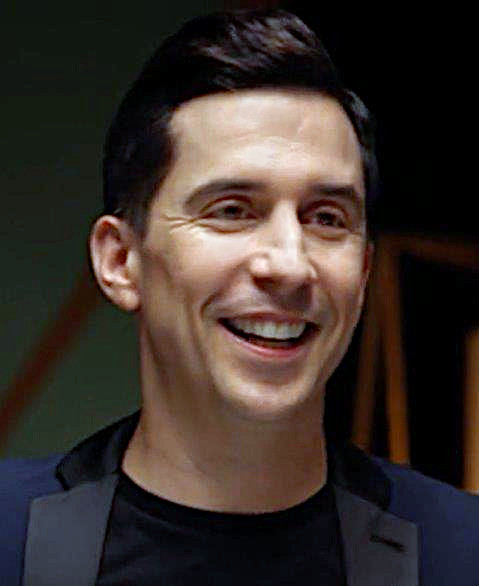
- Kane in 2019
- Born: Russell David Anthony Grineau; 19 August 1975 (age 51); London, England
- Occupations: Writer, comedian, actor
- Years active: 2004–present
- Spouses: Sadie Hasler (m. 2010; div. 2011) Lindsey Cole (m. 2014)
- Children: 1
- Website: russellkane.co.uk

Russell Kane (born Russell David Anthony Grineau; 19 August 1975) is an English writer, comedian, and actor. He has four times been nominated at the Edinburgh Comedy Awards, winning the Best Comedy Show award in 2010. Although known mainly for stand-up comedy, for television, he has presented Big Brother's Big Mouth (2007), I'm a Celebrity Get Me Out of Here – Now (2009–2011), Freak Like Me (2010), Geordie Shore: The Reunion and Britain Unzipped (2012), Live at the Electric (2013), Stupid Man, Smart Phone (2016), and hosted the BBC Radio 4 series Evil Genius in 2018 as well as a television show by the same name on Sky History in 2023.

== Early life ==
Kane was born to David and Julie Grineau in Enfield, North London and brought up in Essex, where he still lives. He studied English at Middlesex University and graduated with a degree in Media Writing.

== Career ==
Kane's father had worked as an extra and took on a couple of youthful acting roles in the early 1990s, under the name Russell Grineaux.

Turning to comedy, in 2004, Kane won the Laughing Horse New Act of the Year, and in the same year he was runner-up to Nick Sun in So You Think You're Funny. In 2005, he joined Ray Peacock, Russell Howard and Reginald D. Hunter on the national Paramount Edinburgh and Beyond tour. He was a roving reporter alongside Annie Mac, for the live music event Guerrilla Gig, which aired on BBC Three in March 2006. In July 2006, he wrote and presented travelogues for the newly launched Five US.

In August 2006, Kane performed his debut comedy show The Theory of Pretension at the Edinburgh Fringe, where he was nominated for a best newcomer Edinburgh Comedy Award. He presented Big Brother's Big Mouth on E4 and Channel 4 in June 2007.

In 2008, Kane was the host of BBC Radio 2's Out to Lunch from series 4 onwards. He presented a Sunday afternoon show on the relaunched Q Radio digital radio station. Later the same year, he took his stand-up show Gaping Flaws to Glasgow and the Edinburgh Festival, earning 2008 Best Comedy Show Nominee at the Edinburgh Comedy Awards. He also wrote an hour-long play, The Lamentable Tragedie of Yates's Wine Lodge based on his own creation of Fakespeare. On 20 November 2008, Kane performed at the Hammersmith Apollo for the BBC's Live at the Apollo.

In 2009, Kane returned to Edinburgh with a stand-up show entitled Human Dressage, which was nominated for 2009 Best Comedy Show Edinburgh Comedy Award for the second time. Kane appeared on the presenting team of the 2009 ITV2 spin-off show I'm a Celebrity Get Me Out of Here – Now, which he co-hosted with Laura Whitmore and Joe Swash. Two contestants that year were Gino D'Acampo and Katie Price. He returned to Australia for the show in 2010 and 2011.

In April 2010, while appearing on the Australian TV show Good News Week, Kane made a joke centred on autistic children, prompting an apology from the network and criticism from the Parliamentary Secretary for Disabilities. Later that year, Kane appeared live in Cardiff, along with his impressionist and comedienne wife Sadie Hasler, who preceded his act. Kane was narrator and presenter Freak Like Me on BBC Three during the winter of 2010.

In August 2011, he appeared for the first time on the BBC Radio Four comedy panel game Just a Minute, which he won. In November 2011, he won a Children in Need edition of Celebrity Mastermind, with the specialist subject "The Life and Novels of Evelyn Waugh". On 5 July 2011 and 27 March 2012, he presented Geordie Shore: The Reunion for MTV.

His debut novel, The Humorist, was published by Simon & Schuster in April 2012. In 2012, he co-presented Britain Unzipped with Greg James on BBC Three, which was renamed Unzipped for series 2. He was the presenter of the BBC Three show Live at the Electric, which ran for three series, and co-hosted the 2013 chat show Staying In with Greg James.

In 2016, Kane presented the BBC Three travel series Stupid Man, Smart Phone.

In January 2018, Kane participated in And They're Off! in aid of Sport Relief.

In March 2018, Kane started hosting the BBC Radio 4 series Evil Genius. This programme is an exploration of famous people in contemporary history.

== Awards ==
- 2004 Laughing Horse New Act of the Year
- 2004 So You Think You're Funny: 2nd Place
- 2006 Edinburgh Comedy Awards: Best Newcomer nominee
- 2008 Edinburgh Comedy Awards: Best Comedy Show nominee
- 2009 Edinburgh Comedy Awards: Best Comedy Show nominee
- 2010 Edinburgh Comedy Awards: Best Comedy Show
- 2011 Barry Award

== Personal life ==
Kane married fellow comedian Sadie Hasler in 2010. They met while studying at Middlesex University. They divorced nine months later. He married the hair and makeup artist and entrepreneur, Lindsey Cole in 2014. They had met when Cole had attended one of his shows and later connected through social media. They have one daughter. Kane said in 2015 that he is often mistaken for Nick Grimshaw.

In 2015, it was revealed that Kane had been lying about his age, claiming to be five years younger than his actual age.

Kane has been an ambassador for The Prince's Trust, a charity.

== Bibliography ==
- The Humorist, 2012 (novel)
- Son of a Silverback, 2019 (memoir)
- Pet Selector! A Hilarious Guide to All the Usual and Unusual Household Pets (Illustrated by Erica Salcedo)

== Stand-up DVDs ==
- Smokescreens & Castles Live (7 November 2011)
- Live (30 November 2015)
