= Stupid Man, Smart Phone =

- Starring: Russell Kane
- Country of origin: United Kingdom
- No. of episodes: 6

Original release
- Network: BBC Three
- Release: May 2016

Stupid Man, Smart Phone is a British reality TV series which sees Russell Kane dropped into a different, treacherous environment every episode. Kane and a guest must survive with no training or knowledge of the local language or customs, only their mobile phones.

Commissioned by BBC Three and BBC Worldwide, it is a co-production from Kalel Productions and Second Star, part of Objective Media Group. It aired on BBC Three and BBC Two in May 2016.

The Guardian described it as "entertaining (and) amusing", and preferable to Bear Grylls.

== Episodes ==
1. Morocco
2. Norway
3. Costa Rica: Jungle
4. Italy
5. Poland
6. Costa Rica: Desert Island
