= South Side Story (2014 TV series) =

- Country of origin: United Kingdom
- Original language: English
- No. of series: 1
- No. of episodes: 6

Production
- Running time: 30 minutes
- Production company: Knickerbockerglory

Original release
- Network: BBC Three; BBC Three HD
- Release: 26 January – 3 March 2015

South Side Story is a structured reality entertainment programme first broadcast on BBC Three on 26 January 2015. The six-part series is about musicians and artists in South London. The series has been described as The Only Way is Essex meets Glee.

== Production ==
The series was commissioned by Zai Bennett and Sean Hancock, and produced by Knickerbockerglory. A non-transmission pilot episode was made in 2013. The director is Ben Cook and executive producer is Jonathan Stadlen.

=== Main cast ===
Cast member	Occupation
Alaric	Personal Trainer, Bouncer and was a contestant on the fifth series of The Voice UK
Alistair	Singer
Annabell	Model
Deke	Singer
Fayy	Street Dancer
Gilly	Choreographer
Jayden "Fresh"	Personal Trainer and Appeared on the third series of Ex on the Beach
Jaynee	Singer
Jodie	Singer
Kelz	Rapper
Lady Lykez	Rapper
Levi	Dancer
Mim	Aspiring Radio Presenter
Nyomi "Ny"	Singer
Rachelle	Model and single mum
Shahnequa	Aspiring Actress
Suzette	Choreographer
Sylvia	Glamour Model
Yinka	Radio Presenter
