= Unzipped (TV series) =

British comedy television series

- Also known as: Britain Unzipped
- Genre: Comedy
- Directed by: Graham Proud; Jeanette Goulbourn
- Presented by: Russell Kane; Greg James
- Theme music composer: Mathieu Karsenti
- Composer: Mathieu Karsenti
- Original language: English
- No. of series: 2
- No. of episodes: 14

Production
- Executive producers: Leon Wilson; Ruby Kuraishe
- Producer: Natalie Green
- Production locations: Riverside Studios, London
- Editors: Matt Roberts; Philip Lepherd; Graham Portbury
- Running time: 60 minutes (series 1); 45 minutes (series 2)
- Production company: Talkback

Original release
- Network: BBC Three
- Release: 24 April – 21 November 2012

Unzipped (known as Britain Unzipped for the first series) is a comedy British television programme broadcast on BBC Three between 24 April 2012 and 21 November 2012. It was presented by Greg James and Russell Kane.

== Format ==
In the show, presenters Greg and Russell try to find out what is weird and wonderful about the people of Britain. Over the course of six weeks, they asked a total of five-hundred questions to people, and put together the 'Britain Unzipped Report', made up of statistics taken from the overall answer to each question. Such questions include 'Have you ever woken up and had no idea where you were?' and 'would you watch a friends sex tape if it was leaked on the internet?'. They then ask these questions to a celebrity guest, and to special members of the audience, the 'Britain Unzipped Sample', which have been specifically chosen to be the most likely to give entertaining answers.

James said of the series: "I'm pretty sure we live in a nation full of characters – this show will find out once and for all just how weird we actually are. It'll also make me feel better about how often my Internet history is cleared!" Kane commented: "I am absolutely thrilled to be involved in this project. Given that I don't even have a clue who I am, I'm going to enjoy picking apart who everyone else is." BBC Three controller Zai Bennett says of the series: "Britain Unzipped will be a unique show examining the state of the nation that is the BBC Three audience. With Greg and Russell at the helm it promises to be an irreverent and hilarious look at exactly what our audience are up to and what they think of one another."

On 11 June 2012, less than a week after the first series ended, it was announced that Britain Unzipped had been recommissioned for a second series. On 6 August 2012, it was announced on the official Facebook of BBC Three that Britain Unzipped would be returning as Unzipped and not as Britain Unzipped, though a reason for this has not yet been given. The second series began on BBC Three on 3 October 2012.

== Features ==
Features of the series include:

- Normality Rating (Series 1–2) – Greg and Russell ask questions from the unzipped report to their celebrity guest(s), to find out if they are normal or abnormal. Their answers are calculated into a normality rating percentage and then placed on a chart which rates from boring to super weird. At the end of the series, the weirdest celebrity of all becomes the winner.
- Man vs. Woman (Series 1) – Greg and Russell pit a man and woman against each other in a three question shootout, to see which gender is most down-to-earth. The winning gender receives a number of prizes based on their gender.
  - The Reality Check (Series 2) – In the second series, the celebrity guest(s) play against two people from the unzipped sample under the same rules as Man vs. Woman but this time, the prizes are based on or related to the celebrity guests who are present on the show that week, such as albums, books etc.
- Celebs Unzipped (Series 1) – Greg and Russell invite their celebrity guest(s) to attempt to win booze for the entire audience by answering five questions correctly based on confessions made by nine celebrities for the celebrity guest to choose on a tic-tac-toe board.
  - Celebrity Confessions (Series 2) – In the second series, the celebrity guests now need to answer three questions correctly to win booze for the audience and the tic-tac-toe board was replaced by a fictional spinning on-screen wheel to decide which of the celebrity confessions the celebrity guests will be attempting to answer.

== Episodes ==
=== Overview ===
Series	Start date	End date	Episodes
1	24 April 2012	5 June 2012	6
2	3 October 2012	21 November 2012	8

=== Series 1 ===
Episode	Air date	Guest(s)	Normality rating	Man vs. Woman
1	24 April 2012	Holly Willoughby		
2	1 May 2012	Christine Bleakley		
3	8 May 2012	Emily Atack; Adam Deacon		
4	15 May 2012	Kimberly Wyatt		
5	29 May 2012	Charlie Brooks; Tinchy Stryder		
6	5 June 2012	Chelsee Healey; Joe Swash		

=== Series 2 ===
Episode	Air date	Guest(s)	Weirdo of the Week	The Reality Check
1	3 October 2012	Anthony Joshua; Sara Cox	Anthony Joshua	Sara Cox wins
2	10 October 2012	Fearne Cotton; Aiden Grimshaw	Aiden Grimshaw	Fearne wins
3	17 October 2012	Nancy Dell'Olio; Louis Smith	Nancy Dell'Olio	Nancy Dell'Olio wins
4	24 October 2012	Emma Bunton; Jade Jones; Dappy	Dappy	Celebrities win
5	31 October 2012	Harry Judd; Danny Jones; Amanda Byram	Danny Jones	Unzipped Sample win
6	7 November 2012	Example; Jerry Springer; Heidi Range	Example	Unzipped Sample win
7	14 November 2012	Danny Dyer; Laura Whitmore	Danny Dyer	Celebrities win
8	21 November 2012	The Best of Unzipped	Nancy Dell'Olio^{1}	—N/a

^{1} Nancy Dell'Olio was voted 'Weirdo of the Series'.
