= Stage School (TV series) =

British reality elevision series

- Genre: Reality television
- Opening theme: Mo's Opening
- Composer: Kevin Kerrigan
- Country of origin: United Kingdom
- Original language: English
- No. of series: 2
- No. of episodes: 60

Production
- Executive producer: Jonathan Stadlen
- Production locations: Bromley, England
- Running time: 23 minutes
- Production company: Knickerbockerglory

Original release
- Network: E4
- Release: 5 September 2016 – 3 November 2017

Stage School is a British reality television series, set at the D&B Academy of Performing Arts, a drama school in Bromley, London. The series follows the lives of staff and students who are trying to make their dreams a reality. It began broadcasting on E4 on 5 September 2016, and was described as a cross between The Only Way is Essex meets Glee meets High School Musical. The second and final series was broadcast from 25 September 2017 to 3 November 2017.

== Cast members ==
Main cast member	Occupation/roles
Angela Russell	Singer, dancer and actor
Betsy-Blue English	Singer, actor and vlogger. She was a member of the group Only The Young who competed in the 11th series of The X Factor.
Casey Johnson	Singer who auditioned for the 11th series of The X Factor and was put together with the group Stereo Kicks. He was briefly a member of Union J.
Daniella Byrne	Actor, dancer and daughter of headmistress and founder of D&B Donna
Durone Stokes	Singer, dancer and actor.
Jamie Knox	Singer, dancer and actor. He is the younger brother of actor Rob Knox
Joe Crick	Dancer
Joe Radford	Actor and Jamie's friend
Josh Harwood	Dancer and trainee director
Leah Bauckham	Dancer
Luciee Closier	Lead singer of Luciee and the Wolf
Luke Higgins	Actor and dancer
Megan Jossa	Singer and actor. She is the cousin of actress Jacqueline Jossa
Mo Mansaray	Singer, dancer and actor
O.J. Budak	Dancer and rapper
Pia Smith	Singer, dancer, actor
Rachael O'Connor	Singer who competed in the 3rd series of The Voice UK
Supporting cast member	Occupation/role
Alex Cowlishaw	Music producer and singer/songwriter
Bonnie Sullivan	Founder of D&B Academy and runs it with her sister Donna
Cathy Foster	Inspired dancer and Jamie girlfriend
Charlotte Morris	Singer and dancer
Dan Walter	Actor and dancer
Donna Sullivan	Founder of D&B Academy and runs it with her sister Bonnie
Jordi Whitworth	Singer who took part in 11th series of The X Factor. He was one 5th of the group Overload Generation
Kerri Doolan	Teacher at D&B
Leanne Elms	D&B talent agent
Neville Bradley Jr	Singer, dancer, actor and gossip blogger
Nikki Gummer	Vocal coach
Sydnie Christmas	Singer
