= Kookyville =

- Genre: Comedy
- Created by: Nichola Hegarty
- Written by: Nichola Hegarty
- Directed by: Eddie Stafford
- Narrated by: Fenella Fielding
- Country of origin: United Kingdom
- No. of series: 1
- No. of episodes: 1

Production
- Executive producers: Nichola Hegarty; Lee Hupfield; Andrew Newman
- Production location: England
- Editor: Ollie Aslin
- Camera setup: Ben Dee; David Capon; Andrew Dishman
- Running time: 22 mins.
- Production company: Objective Productions

Original release
- Network: Channel 4
- Release: 25 November 2012

Kookyville is a British comedy sketch show that aired on 25 November 2012 on Channel 4. The programme, created by Nichola Hegarty, is different from other sketch shows in that "These people are not actors or comedians, and there's no script...they're just real funny people."

It was cancelled after one episode.

== Reception ==
The show received negative reviews from critics. Hugh Montgomery of The Independent said that Kookyville, "...nothing less than the first example of "constructed reality comedy", in no way the kind of idea that would be farted out by an Apprentice contestant should they ever be asked to tackle TV production.", although he did admit that "Not every scene was unwatchable. The one involving two Essex girls' protracted intellectual struggle at a farm was merely a failed audition piece for The Only Way Is Essex, while Bradford entrepreneur Afzal safely plumped for being re-christened Ricky Meh-vais with his unofficial tribute to David Brent." Mouthbox.co.uk said "Kookyville is lowest common denominator, dumbed down TV at its very worst. In a month in which Channel 4 have also launched the dreadful animated series Full English, one does wonder at the lack of judgement and expertise currently being shown by the channel's commissioning editors."

Steve Bennett of chortle.co.uk stated, "Someone at Channel 4 mistook Kookyville for a decent idea. Memo to new Channel 4 comedy chief Phil Clarke – whose current company Objective has to be held responsible for this programme: No more, please. This has to be the worst pilot since Mohamed Atta." Vikki Stone of The Daily Mirror said "...I deliberately approached [Kookyville] with an open mind and as much as it pains me to say it, within the first few moments it did make me laugh. But I wasn't laughing at the jokes, or at a comedy moment timed to perfection... I was simply laughing at the quality of it. I was laughing at genuinely awful acting and mistiming. It was the telly equivalent of am dram."

== See also ==
- Boom Town – a similar series later commissioned for BBC Three in 2013
