= Alice Levine =

British broadcaster, DJ, and narrator (born 1986)

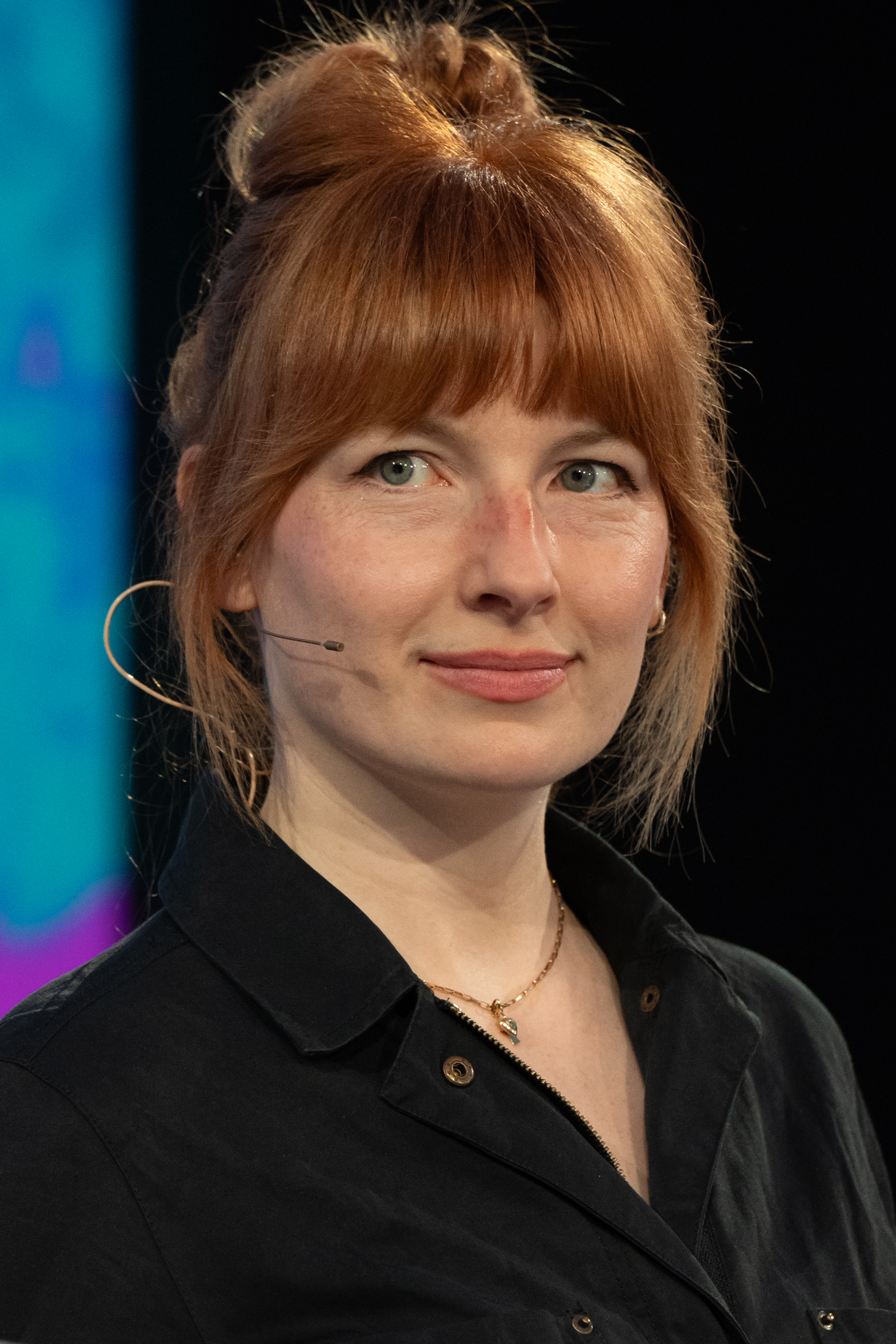
- Levine in 2026
- Born: 8 July 1986 (age 40); Beeston, Nottinghamshire, England
- Education: University of Leeds (BA)
- Occupations: Radio and television presenter
- Years active: 2008–present
- Employer(s): BBC, Channel 4, Wondery
- Known for: BBC Radio 1; My Dad Wrote a Porno; British Scandal
- Television: Big Brother's Bit on the Side; Sex Actually with Alice Levine

Alice Levine (born 8 July 1986) is an English radio and television presenter, writer and narrator. She was a radio DJ for BBC Radio 1 from 2013 to 2020. She co-created and presented the podcast My Dad Wrote a Porno, and is the co-founder of the podcast festival Crossed Wires. Levine has also presented several television programmes, including Sleeping with the Far Right (2019) and Sex Actually with Alice Levine (2021–2023).

== Early life and education ==
Levine was born in Beeston, Nottinghamshire. Her mother was a painter and her father a Sociology lecturer. She has a brother.

Levine studied English at the University of Leeds. There, she met Jamie Morton and James Cooper, her collaborators on My Dad Wrote a Porno, in the TV department. Levine took part in Leeds Student Television, the university's TV station. She and Cooper created a magazine show called LS6. It won Best Light Entertainment Programme at the National Student Television Awards and Levine was voted Best On-Screen Female.

Levine spent some time working in Melbourne. She moved to London in 2007.

== Career ==
In 2007, Levine and James Cooper presented Launch Pad for Bebo in collaboration with RDF digital, where they sent people's messages into space.

In 2008, Levine co-presented the weekly teenage magazine show b-box with Cooper, streamed on Bebo.

=== Television ===
Levine's first television role was for MTV in 2011.

From 2011 to 2013, Levine hosted Big Brother's Bit on the Side with Jamie East on Channel 5. She was also the voice of Big Brother at this time.

Levine has presented coverage for awards including the Europe Music Awards for MTV, the Ivor Novellos Awards and the Isle Of Wight Festival for Sky Arts, the BBC Young Writer's Awards. In 2014, Levine hosted the Barclaycard Mercury Music Sessions and the Mercury Music Prize on Channel 4. Levine has also presented music and arts coverage for a number of music awards and festivals including Glastonbury for the BBC, backstage at the BRIT Awards for ITV2 in 2017 and the BRITs Red Carpet in 2018, Radio 1’s Big Weekend from Derry in May 2013 for BBC Three (co-hosted by Greg James), LoveBox festival for Xbox in 2013. She also hosted the “Red Bull Soapbox Race” live from Alexandra Palace for UKTV on Dave in the summer of 2013.

Levine has also presented various music awards, including the AIM awards in 2015, and the Women in Music awards (at least ten times). She was also the red carpet and backstage host for the BAFTA Craft Awards and the BAFTA TV Awards in May of the same year.

In 2018, Levine co-hosted a series of Channel 4's reality show, The Circle, with Maya Jama.

Broadcast from September to October 2020, Levine co-hosted the 15th series of the BBC Radio 4 programme The Museum of Curiosity alongside John Lloyd.

Levine presented Levine on Love in 2017, a series for the BBC in which she explored the world of modern romance.

Levine has appeared on many comedy shows, including Never Mind the Buzzcocks on BBC2, 8 Out of 10 Cats, Alan Davies: As Yet Untitled for Dave, Room 101, Travel Man with Richard Ayoade, QI, and Would I Lie to You?. In 2018, Levine was one of five contestants in the sixth series of the comedy game show Taskmaster.

==== Sleeping with the Far Right (2019) ====
In February 2019, Channel 4 broadcast Sleeping with the Far Right, a film in which Levine lived for a week with British nationalist Jack Sen in Southport, Merseyside. Sen was a former member of UKIP, which he was expelled from for an anti-Semitic tweet, and the BNP, from which he was suspended for his extremism. He was born Dilip Sengupta to a half-Indian, half-South African father and English mother, grew up (aged seven to twenty) in America, and moved to the UK where he married a Ukrainian woman. Levine said that "it's not really a film about politics, it's film about identity at the heart". She stayed in the house with the director, and the production rented a house nearby in case there was any need for the team to remove themselves from the home.

==== Sex Actually with Alice Levine (2021–2023) ====
In September 2021, Levine presented the first series of the Channel 4 show Sex Actually with Alice Levine [originally titled Sex Odyssey], which was co-produced by documentary maker Louis Theroux and his production company Mindhouse. It explored unconventional relationships across the world. The first series covered 'cam' models (episode 1); BDSM (episode 2); and sex and wellness (episode 3). The second three-part series began airing on 27 February 2023. It covered the integration of technology in sex (episode 1); multi-partner relationships (episode 2); and 'feedism' and 'gaining' (episode 3). In 2023, Levine told Country & Town House that she was working with Theroux and Mindhouse on new documentary projects and ideas.

=== Radio ===
==== BBC Radio 1 (2013–2020) ====
In January 2013, Levine joined BBC Radio 1 to present a show with Phil Taggart in the John Peel slot (10pm to midnight, Mondays to Thursdays). In August 2014, she left her weeknight slot with Taggart to launch and present a solo weekend afternoon show on the station (1–4pm), taking over from Huw Stephens.

On 15 July 2020, Levine announced in an Instagram post that she was leaving Radio 1 after nine years at the station. Her last show was on 9 August 2020 after a series of three farewell shows.

=== Podcasting ===
==== My Dad Wrote a Porno (2015–2022) ====
Levine is one of the three co-creators of the podcast My Dad Wrote a Porno, alongside Jamie Morton and James Cooper who met whilst studying at Leeds University. It launched in September 2015 and ended in 2022 after 181 episodes. Each episode of the podcast featured Morton reading a new chapter of Belinda Blinked, an amateur erotic novel series written by his father under the pen name Rocky Flintstone. Morton, Cooper, and Levine reacted to the material and provided a running commentary.

The podcast had shorter spin-off episodes called 'Footnotes', featuring a range of a-list names, such as Dame Emma Thompson, Lin Manuel Miranda and Michael Sheen. Levine says she looks up to Julia Davis, and was very pleased when Davis and Vicky Pepperdine (as their characters Joan and Jericha) appeared on the podcast.

The podcast had two world tours, which included locations such as the Sydney Opera House, Royal Albert Hall, and Radio City Music Hall. It also went to the Edinburgh Fringe Festival. In 2019, the team produced an HBO special based on their live show.

Merchandise was created for the series. The team (Levine, Morton, Cooper and Morton's father) also created a book, My Dad Wrote a Porno: The Fully Annotated Edition of Belinda Blinked, published in October 2016 by Quercus.

My Dad Wrote a Porno has been dubbed the "most successful podcast in British history". It was given awards including the British Podcast Awards, and a Webby Award in 2019 in the comedy category. It surpassed fifty million downloads worldwide in 2015, and by the end of its final sixth series had reached 430 million downloads. It was regularly at the top of the iTunes podcast chart.

At the end of the series in 2022, the presenters said there would be something else to come out of this project, but this has yet to materialise.

==== British Scandal (2021) ====
In April 2021, Levine began hosting Wondery true crime podcast British Scandal with Matt Forde, which tells the stories of British history. The series was nominated for Best Entertainment Podcast and won The Spotlight Award at the British Podcast Awards in 2022.

==== Other (2022–present) ====
In the 2022, Levine presented Very Modern Quests, a role-playing improv podcast released as an Audible Original. The series featured participants such as Greg James, Joe Lycett and Phil Wang.

In 2024, Levine produced and presented The Price of Paradise, a true story based around 2002 TV show No Going Back, detailing the story of Jayne Gaskin, who bought a private island off Nicaragua.

Levine co-founded and runs the Crossed Wires Podcast Festival, held in Sheffield, alongside producer Dino Sofos and Tramlines co-founder James O'Hara. The first festival was supported by the South Yorkshire Mayoral Combined Authority, which provided £325,000 of funding for the event. In the second year, Greg James also joined as Creative Director.

=== Other work ===
In 2013, Levine co-founded a supper club, Jackson & Levine, with business partner Laura Jackson. In 2014, the pair wrote a food column for Company magazine. In 2015, they completed a Channel 4 Shorts series, My Pop-Up Restaurant. In 2017, they produced a book, Round to Ours, published by Quadrille, which includes recipes used at their supper clubs. They have collaborated on two ranges for Habitat: a range of table linens in 2017, and a range of ceramic tableware in 2018.

== Awards and nominations ==
- Best On-Screen Female, National Student Television Awards.
- 2015 – The Music Week Best Music Show Award for her solo weekend show on BBC Radio 1.

Levine had a Nottingham City bus named after her.

== Filmography and broadcast history ==
=== Television ===
Year	Title	Channel	Role	Notes	Ref
2010	Celebrity Bites	MTV	Presenter		
2011–2013	Big Brother's Bit on the Side	Channel 5	Main weekend presenter	with Jamie East	
2012–2013	The Hot Desk	ITV2	Presenter		
2013	Crazy Beaches		Narrator		
2013	Red Bull Soap Box	Dave	Co-presenter	with Ed Leigh	
2013	LoveBox festival coverage	Xbox	Presenter	with Greg James	
2013–2019	Radio 1's Big Weekend	BBC Three	Co-presenter	with various	
2014	Invasion of the Job Snatchers		Narrator	1 series	
2014	Barclaycard Mercury Music Sessions	Channel 4	Presenter		
2014	Mercury Music Prize	Channel 4	Presenter		
2015	Girls Can Code		Presenter	2 episodes	
2015	My Dad Wrote a Porno	HBO	Herself	Special; also executive producer	
2015	My Pop-Up Restaurant	Channel 4		Shorts series with Laura Jackson	
2015, 2017	Glastonbury Festival		Presenter		
2016	Debatable		Panel member	4 appearances	
2016	Books That Made Britain		Presenter		
2016	Bargain Hunt		Contestant	Children in Need special	
2016	Celebrity Advice Bureau		Herself	3 episodes	
2016–2017	Alan Davies: As Yet Untitled		Panellist		
2017	Levine on Love	BBC	Presenter	3 episodes	
2017–2019	Brit Awards		Backstage presenter		
2018	The Circle	Channel 4	Co-presenter	with Maya Jama	
2018	Taskmaster	Channel 4	Contestant	Series 6; Episodes 1–10	
2019	Sleeping with the Far Right	Channel 4	Presenter		
2021	Sex Actually with Alice Levine	Channel 4	Presenter	Series 1	
2023	Sex Actually with Alice Levine	Channel 4	Presenter	Series 2	

=== Radio ===
Year	Title	Station	Role	Notes	Ref
2013 – 2014		BBC Radio 1	Presenter	with Phil Taggart	
2014 – 2020		BBC Radio 1	Presenter		
2020	The Museum of Curiosity	BBC Radio 4	Presenter	with John Lloyd	

=== Podcasting ===
Year	Title	Network	Role	Notes	Ref
2015 – 2022	My Dad Wrote a Porno	Acast	Co-creator, Presenter	181 episodes	
2021	British Scandal	Wondery	Presenter	with Matt Forde	
2022	Very Modern Quests	Audible	Presenter		
2024	The Price of Paradise		Presenter		
2026	Bad Chat with Greg James and Alice Levine		Presenter		

== Personal life ==
Levine has lived in London most of her adult life. She lives in East London.
