= Rebecca Morelle =

British science journalist

Rebecca Sabrina Morelle (born 1978) is a British science journalist, former BBC News global science correspondent and currently BBC News Science Editor.

== Early life ==
Born in London, Morelle attended Goffs School (now Goffs Academy) in Cheshunt in Borough of Broxbourne, south-east Hertfordshire.

== Career ==
Morelle graduated from the University of Oxford in July 2001, with a first class degree in chemistry, and then worked as senior press officer at the Science Media Centre.

In November 2005, Morelle was the first recipient of the Ivan Noble Bursary at BBC News.
