= My Dad Wrote a Porno =

British comedy podcast

- Genre: Comedy
- Language: English

Cast and voices
- Hosted by: Jamie Morton; James Cooper; Alice Levine

Technical specifications
- Audio format: Acast; iTunes; SoundCloud; Spotify

Publication
- No. of episodes: 194
- Original release: 4 October 2015 – 12 December 2022

Reception
- Ratings: 4.6/5

Related
- Website: mydadwroteaporno.com

My Dad Wrote a Porno is a British comedy podcast hosted by Jamie Morton, James Cooper, and Alice Levine. Published from 4 October 2015 to 12 December 2022, each episode of the podcast features Morton reading a new chapter of Belinda Blinked, an amateur erotic novel series written by his father under the pen name Rocky Flintstone. Morton, Cooper, and Levine react to the material and provide running commentary.

During its run, the podcast was downloaded over 430 million times. On 11 May 2019, HBO aired a comedy special of the show which featured a "lost chapter" from one of the books. The special was filmed over two nights in front of a live audience at the Roundhouse theatre in London.

== History ==
The podcast was devised and presented by television writer and director Jamie Morton, digital executive James Cooper, and television and radio presenter Alice Levine. The three originally met at the University of Leeds before they began working in broadcasting, and had previously worked together on other projects.

The podcast originated at a family gathering for Morton's sister's birthday, where Morton's father took him into his study and handed him some chapters of a novel he had been writing under the pen name "Rocky Flintstone" in his garden shed (which Morton claims is because his mother won't let his father write it in the house). Morton realised with shock that he was reading the first chapter of his father's erotic novel, Belinda Blinked. He shared the chapter with friends at a Christmas lunch, where Levine suggested that they should create a podcast about it.

The podcast began on 4 October 2015. Morton played the My Dad Wrote a Porno pilot to his family, who were mostly encouraging, but his mother initially found it disgusting, although she was later supportive.

The podcast concluded on 12 December 2022, after six series.

== Format and recording ==
The podcast recording usually took place informally in one of the hosts' houses and each 90-minute recording was edited into a 40-minute episode. The podcast is hosted by Acast, which secured the advertising that funded the production. The adverts were scripted into the advertising section of the podcast and performed by the three presenters. The rest of the podcast is unscripted and spontaneous.

=== Main podcast ===
Cooper and Levine had not heard the chapters before the recording, whereas Morton read them through shortly before recording the episode to familiarise himself with the phrasing and prepare for any accents and characters he may have to adopt.

=== "Footnotes" ===
The podcast featured "Footnotes" episodes which ran concurrently with the series, in which they discussed aspects of the phenomenon and invited notable listeners to discuss Belinda Blinked, offer suggestions, and discuss potential film castings. Footnotes began with episodes featuring Flintstone's biography and questions from listeners. Guests have included Hayley Atwell, Ben Barnes, Rachel Bloom, Charlotte Crosby, George Ezra, Josh Groban, Nicholas Hoult, Dan Levy, Joe Lycett, Stephen Mangan, Thomas Middleditch, Lin-Manuel Miranda, Daisy Ridley, Michael Sheen, Emma Thompson, Jessie Ware, Samara Weaving, Mara Wilson and Elijah Wood.

=== "The Best Of (And Unheard Bits)" ===
The podcast started to release monthly episodes titled "The Best Of (And Unheard Bits)" from 31 July 2023, where the hosts relive some of their "favourite funny moments from all six series PLUS some unheard bits". Each episode is based on different topics with the first episode focusing on the hosts' childhood.

== Other media ==
=== Book (2016) ===
The first series of My Dad Wrote a Porno was published as a book on 27 October 2016. It was designed as a spoof "study guide" with comments, annotations, character appraisals, key themes, and games provided by the hosts. In June 2017, a copy of the book signed by the hosts and Flintstone was auctioned as part of a fundraiser for the victims of the Grenfell Tower fire.

=== Live Show ===
The My Dad Wrote a Porno live show has toured the UK, Ireland, New Zealand, Australia, Canada and the United States including the Edinburgh Festival Fringe in Scotland and Just For Laughs comedy festival in Canada. Another tour celebrating "Belinda's 30th Birthday" commenced with a new format called "Pick Your Own Porno". The tour ended with their final show in Radio City Music Hall, New York City on 30 June 2022, which had been delayed due to COVID-19 pandemic.

=== HBO special (2018) ===
On 27 August 2018, it was announced that HBO had plans to produce a comedy special based on the live tour of My Dad Wrote A Porno. It features a "lost chapter" from one of the books, and has various segments, including audience participation and live reenactments. The special was filmed over two nights in front of a live audience at the Roundhouse theatre in London. The special aired on HBO on 11 May 2019, and in the UK on Sky Atlantic on 16 May.

=== Other ===
The team have also been approached about adapting the material into a film. Based on the "Footnotes" episodes the team have postulated, "Elijah Wood's playing the youngish man. Daisy Ridley's the Duchess. Michael Sheen's Dr. Robbins, he was very excited about that. Thomas Middleditch wanted to be Dr Robbins too, so they'll have to fight for that. Rachel Bloom in prosthetics wanted to be Jim Sterling." At the Edinburgh TV Festival, Cooper said they had also considered musical and animated versions of the podcast, and had previously attempted a pilot for a British broadcaster but this had not worked out.

Belinda's Big Bonus: A Belinda Blinked Game, a boardgame by Amabel Holland, was published by Hollandspiele in October 2025.

== Belinda Blinked (novels) ==
Belinda Blinked is a series of at least six main books, and at least nine spin-off titles, available as self-published e-books for sale and download on Amazon. As of 2017, Flintstone was working on the sixth book and said he intends to continue as he "needs the money".

=== History ===
It was revealed by Flintstone during the final episode of My Dad Wrote a Porno that the inspiration for the first novel came from a conversation he had with his wife, with whom he had written many travel books; his wife mentioned that their books did not sell well, prompting him to remark that "the only thing that sells these days is sex". When his wife replied that she could not write erotica, he took it as a challenge to do it himself. He said he wanted to write a novel along the lines of what he called "50 Colours of Grey".

The first four books were written and completed before the podcast began airing in 2015. The fifth book in the series was the first book written after the podcast premiered, in December 2019.

The main books in the series are (as of March 2026):

- March 2015 – Belinda Blinked 1: A modern story of sex, erotica and passion. How the sexiest sales girl in business earns her huge bonus by being the best at removing her high heels.
- July 2016 – Belinda Blinked 2: The continuing story of, dripping sex, passion and big business deals.: Keep following the sexiest sales girl in business as she earns her huge bonus by removing her silk blouse.
- May 2017 – Belinda Blinked 3: The continuing erotic story of sexual activity, dripping action and even bigger business deals as Belinda relentlessly continues to earn her huge bonus.
- November 2018 – Belinda Blinked 4: An erotic story of sexual prowess, sexy characters and even bigger business deals whilst the darkness increases;.
- December 2019 – Belinda Blinked 5: Belinda Blumenthal, worldwide Sales Director of Steeles Pots and Pans is in big trouble. Can the sexiest girl in sales continue to remove her brassiere whilst the evil grows.
- August 2021 – Belinda Blinked 6: Belinda Blumenthal, ex worldwide Sales Director of Steeles Pots and Pans is finding her new role tough. Can this sexy salesgirl reassert ... & intrigue... (Belinda Blinked; Book 7)

Flinstone has also released several spin-off books in the series:

- December 2015 – The Rocky Flintstone Bottle of Wine a Day Diet: How Belinda Blinked and the Glee Team lose weight and still enjoy life!
- November 2020 – a special lockdown-themed book was released, set during the spring of 2020 during the COVID-19 pandemic called Belinda Blinked; Lockdown 69: A very special Belinda Blinked book written during very unspecial times...
- January 2022 – Belinda Blinked The Extra Bits 1: All the Xmas Specials and The Road to Completion... a naughty look at buying your first home.
- August 2022 – The Belinda Blinked Character Rankings Nos 1-122: Yes Number 122 down to number 1.
- September 2023 – a book meant to be set between books 6 and 7 was released, Belinda Blinked; 6a The MI6 Spanish Mission;: Belinda Blumenthal; Terminated; What does a successful ex Sales Director with time on her hands do? Well... she cleans out her musty old garage.
- September 2023 – a book said to be where Belinda Blumenthal "outlines the secrets of her success and how you can emulate her" – Belinda Blinked; Business Tips for Go Getters from Belinda Blumenthal;: A Life Tips book from Belinda Blumenthal & Rocky Flintstone.
- January 2024 – Belinda Blinked; How to Buy the Best Property for You.: A Life Tips book from Belinda Blumenthal, Bella Ridley and Rocky Flintstone;
- May 2024 – a prequel book was released Belinda Blinked 3a: Belinda Down and Under.
- May 2025 – Rocky Flintstones Sweet Treats... jus treatin!: Recipes from Rocky's Irish Childhood! A Wilma and Rocky Blinkin' cooking extravaganza!! With comments from ... Glee Team.

There has also been a Spanish translation of Belinda Blinked 1.

Flinstone also started a new series called Bill Badger, which contains characters from Belinda Blinked:

- May 2023 –Bill Badger 1: Bill is an irresistible hunk; he’s also a fine goods delivery driver who finds sex staring him in the face at every other address. This is Bill's story.
- May 2025 - Bill Badger 2: Bill is an irresistible hunk; but he’s got problems, women problems. His Father’s new fling Carmen Maria da Silva is a gold digger...

=== Rocky Flintstone ===
"Rocky Flintstone" is the pen name of Morton's father, a retired Northern Irish builder. According to Flintstone, the name "Rocky" was inspired by The Rockford Files and a family friend's dog living in Brazil, also named Rocky. "Flintstone" is inspired by the author's degree in geology and his self-identification with Fred Flintstone as he batters on the door waiting to be allowed back indoors at the end of each Flintstones episode. Before retiring, Flintstone worked as a builder, teacher, and, like his protagonist, in sales. Prior to writing Belinda Blinked, Flintstone self-published a number of non-fiction works on subjects of his personal expertise, including a tourist's guide to Brazil, a mineral identification manual, and a gardening book. The Belinda Blinked series is his only known work of fiction. Flintstone prefers to remain out of the podcast spotlight.

=== Plot ===
The novels tell the story of the sexual exploits of Belinda Blumenthal and her work in the sales and marketing department of the fictional company "Steeles Pots and Pans". Belinda's work takes her around the world, where she meets various sales reps, suppliers, and business associates. Many characters regularly appear throughout the series, although some are introduced only to never be heard from again, or some even change name halfway through a chapter. The writing is erratic, as Morton says: "One moment Belinda is handcuffed to a trellis in a 'medium-sized maze', the next she's at a charity tombola raising funds for the Asses & Donkeys Trust."

== Reception ==
The podcast initially ran into problems with its title, with iTunes refusing to list it and advertisers being reluctant to be involved. However, in 2016, it was at the top of the iTunes charts. By the conclusion of the show's run in December 2022, the podcast had been downloaded over 430 million times.

Dedicated fans are known as "Belinkers"; and, on Mondays, when a new episode was released, the hashtag #PornoDay trended on Twitter. The writing style has been described as "unerotic" and "hideous" (The Guardian), "unintentionally hilarious" and having an "extremely sketchy knowledge of female anatomy" (The Times), as well as "Shakespearesque" (Michael Sheen).

My Dad Wrote a Porno has been cited in best UK podcasts lists compiled by GQ, Square Mile, The Guardian, Huffington Post, BuzzFeed, and Stuff. In 2025, My Dad Wrote a Porno was named as one of the 100 best podcasts of all time by Time.

== Awards ==
- 2016 – Audio and Radio Industry Award (ARIAS) award in the category Podcast of the Year (nominated)
- 2017 – Webby award in the category Comedy (Podcasts & Digital Audio) (nominated)
- 2017 – Listener Choice category of the British Podcast Awards (nominated)
- 2017 – 7th annual Lovie Awards presented by the International Academy of Digital Arts and Sciences (nominated)
- 2019 – "Podcast Champion 2019" at the British Podcast Awards
- 2019 – Webby award in the Comedy category for Podcasts & Digital Audio.
- 2023 – My Dad Wrote a Porno became the first inductee into the British Podcast Awards' Hall of Fame on 28 September 2023.
