= Robb Leech =

British documentary filmmaker

Robb Leech is a British documentary filmmaker and former tree surgeon.

His stepbrother, Richard Dart, converted to an extreme form of Islam in 2009 and later became a convicted terrorist. Leech made two films charting Dart's conversion and later conviction and imprisonment: My Brother the Islamist in 2011 and My Brother the Terrorist in 2014.

In 2015, Leech made a third film, Welcome to the Mosque, which explored the everyday life at the East London Mosque in Whitechapel, one of the biggest mosques in the UK. Leech's filming coincided with three schoolgirls from nearby Bethnal Green Academy going to Syria to join the so-called Islamic State and documented the mosque's attempts to help the missing girls' grieving families, while battling allegations from sections of the media that it was responsible for radicalising the girls themselves.

== See also ==
- Jihad
- Islamism
- British Bangladeshis
- British Pakistanis
