= My Brother the Islamist =

2011 documentary

- Directed by: Robb Leech
- Starring: Richard Dart, Robb Leech
- Country of origin: United Kingdom
- Original language: English

Production
- Producer: Robb Leech

Original release
- Network: BBC Three
- Release: 2011

My Brother the Islamist is a 2011 documentary produced and directed by film-maker Robb Leech. It charts his attempt to reconnect with his stepbrother, Richard Dart, who had in the summer of 2009 converted to Islam under Anjem Choudary, the leader of now proscribed Islamist group Islam4UK. Leech began filming with Dart just a few months after the conversion and continued up until the moment he left for his first Hajj, late in 2010. The film presents a rare insight into the world of Islamic fundamentalism, the young men caught up in it, and the devastating effect it has on families.

First aired on BBC Three in April 2011, My Brother the Islamist has since been broadcast across the world, in countries including Australia, Austria, Canada, Germany, Japan, New Zealand and the USA. The Metro described the film as "...an object lesson in objective filmmaking".

My Brother the Islamist was nominated for a number of awards, including: Best Newcomer Documentary - The Grierson Awards (2011), Best Single Documentary - Royal Television Society West awards (2011), Best Single doc - Televisual Bulldog Awards (2012), Best Documentary - Broadcast Awards (2012) (Highly Commended). The documentary also won Robb Leech Best Debut Director - Edinburgh Television Festival (2011).

A sequel titled My Brother the Terrorist was aired on BBC3 on 28 April 2014.

== See also ==
- British Pakistanis
