= Invasion of the Job Snatchers =

- Genre: Factual
- Narrated by: Alice Levine
- Country of origin: United Kingdom
- Original language: English
- No. of series: 1
- No. of episodes: 6 (list of episodes)

Production
- Executive producer: David Williams
- Producer: Sebastian Grant
- Editor: Sandi Scott
- Running time: 60 minutes

Original release
- Network: BBC Three; BBC Three HD
- Release: 2 April – 7 May 2014

Invasion of the Job Snatchers is a British television series that was first broadcast on BBC Three on 2 April 2014. The six-part series, narrated by Alice Levine, shows previously unemployed people given work experience in Christchurch, Dorset.

== Episode list ==
No.	Title	Original release date
1	"Episode 1"	2 April 2014
2	"Episode 2"	9 April 2014
3	"Episode 3"	16 April 2014
4	"Episode 4"	23 April 2014
5	"Episode 5"	30 April 2014
6	"Episode 6"	7 May 2014

== The Young People ==
- Adam Pike - Adam left mainstream schooling at 14 and fell in with the wrong crowd. His saving grace was the strong work ethic instilled in him by his mum and dad. Adam found it hard to cope when he was made redundant from his job cleaning coaches a year ago. His job placement as a ferry-hand offers the promise of a new career and a fresh start in life.
- Benny Cracknell - Flamboyant Benny has been unemployed since being made redundant from his bar job 6 months ago. He's desperate to find work and support himself financially. His love of Performance Art could make him the perfect candidate for a permanent position currently available at Peek's Party Store.
- Carl Owen - Carl, from Warrington has found himself virtually unemployable. He ended up homeless, at times sleeping rough on the streets, freezing and hungry. 65 year old Master Butcher Robin Lambe is willing to give Carl that much needed fresh start. With a clean slate, it could just be the break of a lifetime Carl's been longing for.
- Christian Richards - The son of an ex-professional footballer, Christian takes all tasks in his life very seriously including his fitness; his body is his temple. Christian doesn't want to be stuck in a dead-end job and wants an opportunity that combines with his love of fitness, but having struggled to find any employment at all recently, and with a young daughter to support, it's now a case of taking whatever comes along.
- Deneka Johnson - Having grown up in care, living in hostels and being held back by her poor school grades, Deneka is struggling to get a proper start in life. She's been applying for everything in her area, but most of the time she's not even getting as far as an interview. All she wants is the chance to better herself, and 64 year old salon owner Irene Soarse is ready to give her that chance.
- Ellie Strocchi - Ellie trained to be a veterinary nurse in her native home town in Italy, but without the relevant UK qualifications, she's unable to pursue her first love of looking after animals. Ellie's tried her hand at various jobs like modeling, and holiday lets, but the 26-year-old fears that her Italian accent sometimes holds her back during job interviews.
- Glenn Page - Aspiring politician Glenn is a sofa surfing political activist. Despite being educated with ‘A’ levels in Media studies, History and IT and a 2:1 degree in Ancient History, none of this has helped him secure a job. With mounting debts close to £25 thousand, he's come to envy the friends who left education early and are now making good money. He needs to start earning, and earning fast. Will the future politician get Christchurch's’ vote?
- James Wilkes - James has never had a job so he's channeled all his energy into volunteering. It's a great way for him to keep busy and also to meet people, as he's a loner in his home Town in Gwent where the cooler kids call him ‘Blade’ because of his long black coats. James has volunteered now for 2 years, even winning himself the title of “Volunteer of the Year”, but it's never amounted to a paid job. James is now struggling for opportunities in his area, which he is desperate to leave. A self-confessed computer geek, James would love a career in design, but at this stage just wants an opportunity. Will Christchurch give him that chance and welcome him with open arms?
- Rachel Walsh - Since being sacked from her bar job 3 months ago, Goby Goth girl Rachel has been unable to get a job. She's determined to tame her temper, put her wild ways behind her, and secure herself a brighter future in Christchurch.
- Remus Williams - DJ and ex-club promoter Remus is a bubbly 22-year old from Leicester. He loves to play up to an audience with his djing, but knows it's time to find himself a ‘proper job’.
- Amber Wood - Self-confessed Daddy's girl Amber is the first to admit that she's used to being spoilt. This 18 year-old still doesn't know how to work a washing machine, or even cook an egg... but she's decided that it's time to cut the apron strings and start becoming independent. First step on that journey is to get herself a job!
- Renee Gordon - Renee used to be an independent woman in her own right, but since losing her job at a call centre, Renee has been relying on her mum for financial support. However, she practices what she preaches and remains positive throughout which Renee puts down to her faith and relationship with God. Having put her partying days behind her, Renee is now a devout Christian, preferring to spend her time at church or spreading a positive message about life to others. If Renee can learn to knit and master enough knitting knowledge she could be offered a part-time job and become part of the Christchurch community.
- Sean Blain - Until 3 years ago Sean worked in a bakery, but since losing that job single dad Sean has not found anything else in his local city of Liverpool, and has had to move back in with his parents who are helping him raise his little girl. Sean realizes it's time to move away and look for work elsewhere in the country.... Even if it means having to be away from the daughter he dotes on.

== Reception ==
Sam Wollaston of The Guardian called the first episode "good television" and criticised Tony Hall for axing BBC Three. The Mayor of Christchurch, John Lofts, said the title of the programme "doesn't reflect what we believe the content of the programme to be".
