= Undercover Princesses =

- Narrated by: Russell Tovey
- Country of origin: United Kingdom
- Original language: English
- No. of series: 1
- No. of episodes: 4

Production
- Executive producers: Nick Parnes; Adam Adler
- Running time: 60 minutes

Original release
- Network: BBC Three
- Release: 7 March – 28 March 2010

Related
- Undercover Princes

Undercover Princesses is a BBC Three reality TV show which took three royal claimants from foreign cultures and placed them in Ingatestone where they had to 'live and date' like normal people. The idea for the programme came from the 1988 Eddie Murphy film Coming to America. The contestants are Xenia Gabriela Florence Sophie Iris, (Xenia Sachsen de), Germany, b. 1986 (great-great-granddaughter of King Friedrich August III of Saxony); Princess (Omumbejja) Sheillah Cinderella Nvannungi of Buganda, Uganda, b. 1982 (daughter of Prince (Omulangira) George William Juuko Walugembe Kassabbanda) although this claim by her is disputed; and Princess Aaliya Sultana Babi of Balasinor, India, b. 1974 (daughter of Muhammed Salabat Khan, Hereditary Prince of Balasinor).

The three women lived in a house together in Essex and the primary focus is on their search to find love in the UK whilst at the same time getting used to doing things for themselves. Only one of the princesses, Sheillah Cinderella Nvannungi, was able to find a long lasting relationship, with former Tobagonian basketball player Paul David as her candidate.

The series was narrated by Russell Tovey.

Four episodes were produced. A male counterpart, Undercover Princes, was made in 2009. A compilation episode entitled Undercover Princes and Princesses, which includes some updates and previously unaired footage from both series, was transmitted on 12 April 2010.
