= Goffs Academy =

School in Waltham Cross, Hertfordshire, England

Location
- Goffs Lane; Waltham Cross, Hertfordshire, EN7 5QW; England; 51°42′23″N 0°03′25″W

Information
- Type: Grammar (1964–1980); Comprehensive (1980–2011), Academy (2011–present)
- Motto: "Sola Virtus Invicta" (1964 – 2006) "Respect Confidence Achievement" (2006 – 2020) "Respectful Resilient Responsible" (2020 – Present)
- Established: 1964
- Trust: Generations Multi Academy Trust
- Department for Education URN: 137532 Tables
- Ofsted: Reports
- Chairman: Andrew Clarke
- Executive headteacher: Alison Garner
- Principal: Mark Ellis
- Gender: Mixed
- Age: 11 to 18
- Enrolment: 1331 (of which 248 are sixth form)
- Houses: Hawk, Phoenix, Falcon and Eagle
- Website: www.goffs.herts.sch.uk

Goffs Academy is a secondary school and sixth form with academy status located in Cheshunt, Hertfordshire, England with around 1,300 students.

The school's motto was "Sola Virtus Invicta", (which roughly translates from Latin to "strength of character alone remains invincible"), in 2006 it was changed to "Respect Confidence Achievement" and in 2020 the motto was changed to "Respectful Resilient Responsible".

The school has had seven head teachers to date: Colin Hadley, John Versey, Jan Cutler, Paula Kenning, Alison Garner, (who took over in September 2010), Ben Pearce and Mark Ellis.

In the most recent Ofsted report the school was deemed "good."

== History ==
Building on the site started in 1964 as a development of Goffs Grammar School.

== Houses ==
Goffs Academy consisted of six houses, each named after an influential person from history: Brontë, Churchill, Columbus, Curie, Mandela and Monet. The original house names that existed during the Dr Hadley administration were Davies, represented in yellow, Trayhern in blue, Booker house in green and Morgan in red. These houses would compete in inter-house sports and enterprise competitions, and tutorial form and registration sessions would be organised in mixed year groups under each house. However, changes introduced in 2009 have taken emphasis off of the house structure – form lessons now occur in year groups, and many inter-house championships have not been reformed to fit the new system. The six-house structure was introduced in 2002; the original house structure consisted of four houses: Davies, Booker, Morgan and Trayhern. House events often took place including charitable activities towards each house's chosen charity. In 2014 the houses were renamed from Holmes, Pratchett, Branson and Westwood, to Hawk, Phoenix, Falcon and Eagle. Inter-house championships and competitions are being re-introduced within this system to reinvigorate community spirit in the school.

== Sports ==
Many of Goffs' sports teams have performed well at the county and in some cases national level. Aside from this, the school often runs inter-house competitions in various sports, such as rugby and a swimming gala in which students and teachers can take part.

The school hosts a sports day annually, held in the summer, which consists of track and field events.

Sporting Facilities at the school include Astro-turf, Sports Hall and a Large Field.

== Notable former pupils ==
- Suzannah Dunn, historical fiction author

=== Goffs School ===
- Zai Bennett, television executive
- David Bentley, professional footballer
- Rebecca Morelle (1990–97), BBC science correspondent

=== Goffs Grammar School ===
- Richard Lewis, professional tennis player, Chair of Sport England, chief executive officer The All England Lawn Tennis Club, Wimbledon.

== See also ==
- Goffs-Churchgate Academy
