= Goffs-Churchgate Academy =

Location
- College Road; Cheshunt, Hertfordshire, EN8 9LY; Great Britain
- Coordinates: 51°42′04″N 0°02′43″W

Information
- Type: Academy
- Motto: Respect, Aspire, Nurture, Achieve
- Opened: September 2017 (–July 2018 first year of service)
- Local authority: Broxbourne Borough Council
- Trust: Generations Multi Academy Trust
- Department for Education URN: 145297 Tables
- Ofsted: Reports
- Executive headteacher: Alison Garner
- Principal: Danny Bryant
- Gender: Coeducational
- Age: 11 to 16
- Enrolment: Approximately 600 students
- Houses: Attenborough, Rashford, Seacole, Trott
- Colours: Green, Red, Blue, Yellow
- Website: www.goffschurchgate.herts.sch.uk

Goffs-Churchgate Academy is a secondary school with academy status located in Cheshunt, Hertfordshire, England with around 600 students.

== History ==
Cheshunt Grammar School was built in 1935 in Windmill Lane. Over the years many newer buildings were added around the original building. In 1988 the County Council closed the nearby Bishopslea School in College Road, and distributed the pupils around the other local schools, although Cheshunt Grammar School took most of the pupils and some teachers. In 1990, it was decided to move the entire school to the old Bishopslea School site in College Road.

The new school was called Cheshunt School and opened in September 1992. The old Grammar School was demolished and became a housing estate, despite the County Council's explicit prior assurances during a consultation period with local residents that the site would not be used for housing and that it would instead be put to use for the local community, before the school was closed, with street names reflecting the names of past people at the school. Until 2005, the old outdoor pool remained disused and undeveloped, but has since been turned into flats. The school was previously known as Cheshunt School up until 2017 when it merged with Goffs School.

== Notable former pupils ==
- Tim Brown, Chief Executive since 2014 of Jersey Post, and Chief Executive from 2008 to 2011 of the Postal Services Commission
- Matt King, comedian, actor, played Super Hans in Peep Show
- Ryan Mason, footballer

=== Cheshunt Grammar School ===
- Prof John Brooks, Vice-Chancellor from 2005 to 2015 of Manchester Metropolitan University and from 1998 to 2005 of the University of Wolverhampton
- Geoffrey Hodgson, academic
- Peter Moules and Tommy Moeller (singer) from Unit 4 + 2
- Robin Plummer Libyan Hostage 1984–85
- Heather Tomlinson, Director of Education from 2001 to 2004 for Nottinghamshire
- Benjamin Travers FRS, surgeon
- Sir David Watson (although later attended Eton), academic, Professor of Higher Education Management from 2005 at the UCL Institute of Education, Vice-Chancellor from 1992 to 2005 of the University of Brighton, and Director from 1990 to 1992 of Brighton Polytechnic
- Andy Parker, drummer and founding member of legendary British rock band UFO

=== Cheshunt Secondary Modern School ===
- John Dalton, bass guitarist in The Kinks (replacing Pete Quaife in 1969)
- Bob Henrit, musician with Unit 4 + 2 and The Kinks
- Buster Meikle and Brian Parker, from 1960s group Unit 4 + 2
- Cliff Richard (Harry Webb), pop singer
