= Harry Watling =

English football coach

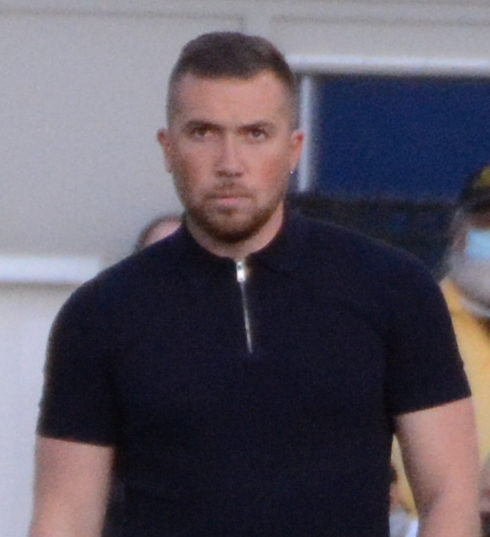
- Watling with Hartford Athletic in 2021

Personal information
- Full name: Harry Watling
- Date of birth: 28 November 1989 (age 36)
- Place of birth: London, England

Managerial career
- Years: Team
- 2021–2022: Hartford Athletic
- 2022: Queens Park Rangers (first team coach)
- 2022–2023: Rangers (assistant coach)
- 2024: Ebbsfleet United
- 2025: Middlesbrough (assistant)
- 2025–2026: Wolverhampton Wanderers (assistant)

Harry Watling is an English football coach, whose last job was as the assistant head coach of English club Wolverhampton Wanderers.

== Coaching career ==
Watling earned his UEFA B licence at age 18, A licence at 26 and his Pro licence at 33. He went on to work as an academy coach with Chelsea from 2009 to 2014, Millwall from 2014 to 2018, and West Ham United from 2018, before becoming head coach of USL Championship side Hartford Athletic on 13 January 2021.

He won his first match in charge of Hartford against New York Red Bulls II, and in his fourth match recorded the club's biggest ever win with a 7–0 victory, again against New York Red Bulls II. Hartford registered a 5th place league finish in Watling's first season. On 25 June 2022, Watling resigned from his role as Hartford coach to attend to family matters in England.

On 25 July 2022, Watling joined Championship side Queens Park Rangers as a first team coach. 4 months later he followed departing manager Michael Beale to Rangers.

On 12 September 2024, Watling was appointed manager of National League club Ebbsfleet United. On 11 December 2024, the club announced his departure by mutual consent. He was announced as part of the backroom staff of Rob Edwards for Middlesbrough on 24 June 2025. After the pair led the club to a record start to top the championship, in early November, Watling followed Edwards to the Premier league as assistant head coach at Wolverhampton Wanderers.

== Personal life ==
Watling is married to Northern Ireland women's national football team player Ciara Watling.

== Managerial statistics ==
Managerial record
Team	Nat	From	To		Record						
Team	Nat	From	To	P	W	D	L	GF	GA	GD	Win %
Hartford Athletic	(United States)	13 January 2021	25 June 2022	49	20	9	20	80	62	+18	40.82%
Ebbsfleet United	(England)	12 September 2024	11 December 2024	18	3	6	8	20	34	-14	16.6%
