= Ivan Noble =

British journalist (1967–2005)

- Ivan Noble
- Born: June 1967; Leeds, England
- Died: 31 January 2005 (aged 37); London, England
- Occupations: translator, journalist
- Years active: 1990–2005
- Spouse: Almut

Ivan Noble (June 1967 – 31 January 2005) was a British journalist who worked for BBC News Online, and became well known for his diary documenting his fight against cancer.

Born in Leeds, he lived in East Germany working as a translator between 1988 and 1990. He then joined the BBC, originally working for them as a translator, then as a sub-editor in Nairobi. He later worked in the Science and Technology section of the BBC News website, where he was known for his love of complicated gadgetry.

He was diagnosed with glioblastoma multiforme on 29 August 2002, and wrote about his battle against the cancer on the BBC News website in a series entitled Tumour Diary. Noble continued to write stories for the series until 30 January 2005, the day before he died. The tumor left him with serious visual impairments on the right side. In December 2004, having completed several courses of chemotherapy, and after a brief remission, his tumor started to grow again. Noble enjoyed a huge amount of public support during this period.

His final comment before his death ended with the statement "I will end with a plea. I still have no idea why I ended up with a cancer, but plenty of other cancer patients know what made them ill...If two or three people stop smoking as a result of anything I have ever written then the one of them who would have got cancer will live and all my scribblings will have been worthwhile."

Noble died in a London hospice aged 37. He was survived by his wife, Almut, and two children (a son and daughter).

== Legacy ==
A book entitled Like a Hole in the Head (ISBN 0-340-86428-1), which chronicles Noble's fight with cancer, was released in May 2005. A bursary was established by the BBC in Noble's memory; it will provide annual funding for a newly qualified journalist to work at the science and technology desk of the BBC News website for six months. The first recipient of this bursary was Rebecca Morelle.

== See also ==
- List of notable brain tumor patients
