= Doctor Who: Greatest Monsters & Villains =

- Title card.
- Presented by: Joel Dommett
- Country of origin: United Kingdom
- Original language: English
- No. of series: 1
- No. of episodes: 10

Production
- Executive producer: Mark Cossey
- Producer: Bernard Markey
- Running time: 46 min - 100 min

Original release
- Network: BBC Three
- Release: 15 November – 17 November 2013

Related
- Doctor Who

Doctor Who: Greatest Monsters & Villains is a BBC countdown of Doctor Who's ten most popular monsters and villains as voted for by viewers, presented by Joel Dommett to commemorate the 50th anniversary of the long running sci-fi drama. The compilations looks at antagonists that have featured in one of the revived series. Later that episode is played in full, and the show shows clips from the classic series.

== Episode list ==
Episode #	Air Date	Antagonists Ranking #	Monster/Villain	Doctor Who Episode/s	Doctor faced in episode	Companion faced in episode
1	15 November 2013	10	Judoon	"Smith and Jones"	Tenth Doctor	Martha Jones
2	15 November 2013	9	Silurians	"A Good Man Goes to War"	Eleventh Doctor	Amy Pond and Rory Williams
3	15 November 2013	8	Ood	"Planet of the Ood"	Tenth Doctor	Donna Noble
4	15 November 2013	7	Clockwork Robots	"The Girl in the Fireplace"	Tenth Doctor	Rose Tyler and Mickey Smith
5	16 November 2013	6	Ice Warriors	"Cold War"	Eleventh Doctor	Clara Oswald
6	16 November 2013	5	Cybermen	"The Next Doctor"	Tenth Doctor	Jackson Lake
7	16 November 2013	4	The Silence	"The Impossible Astronaut" / "Day of the Moon"	Eleventh Doctor	Amy Pond and Rory Williams
8	17 November 2013	3	The Master	"Utopia"	Tenth Doctor	Martha Jones and Captain Jack Harkness
9	17 November 2013	2	Weeping Angels	"Blink"	Tenth Doctor	Martha Jones
10	17 November 2013	1	Daleks	"Dalek"	Ninth Doctor	Rose Tyler
