= Julian Bellamy =

British television producer

Julian Bellamy is a British television executive and managing director of ITV Studios.

Bellamy began his career as a freelance assistant producer working on ITV's World in Action and The Big Story, and Channel 4's Dispatches. He was appointed editor of current affairs at Channel 4 in 1998. He spent eight years at Channel 4, including commissioning editor of Big Brother from 2001, head of factual entertainment from February 2003, and head of E4 in 2005, before being appointed controller of BBC Three in 2006. He returned to Channel 4 to become head of programming in 2007, moving on to work for Discovery Communications and ITV.

In June 2019, Bellamy appeared before the Digital, Culture, Media and Sport Committee to respond to criticism of the recently cancelled ITV production The Jeremy Kyle Show, which was axed followed the death of one of its participants. He appeared alongside Tom McLennan, who served as executive producer of the show, and Graham Stanier, head of the show's after care.

Media offices
| Preceded by Stuart Murphy | Controller of BBC Three; 2006–2007 | Succeeded by Danny Cohen |
