= Stuart Murphy =

British television executive (born 1971)

Stuart Neil Luke Murphy CBE (born 6 November 1971 in Leeds) was the Chief Executive of the English National Opera (2018–2023). He was educated at St Mary's School, Menston and Clare College, Cambridge.

From 2012 to 2015, he was Director, Entertainment Channels at Sky overseeing Sky 1, Sky Living, Sky Arts and the launch of Sky Atlantic. Sky won its first Emmy Awards and Oscar nominations as well as BAFTAs, British Comedy Awards and Royal Television Society Awards during this period. Murphy also had responsibility for Sky Arts, which as well as a channel is an on-demand library of arts and cultural content in Europe.

In 2003 Murphy launched BBC Three and commissioned Little Britain, Gavin and Stacey and Flashmob The Opera. Before BBC Three, he was Channel Controller of BBC Choice, and previously he ran UK Play, a music and comedy channel co-owned by BBC Worldwide.

Previously a board member of the A&E Networks International, and Silicon Valley–based Jaunt Virtual Reality Company. He was made a Fellow of the Royal Television Society in 2016.

Under Stuart Murphy, the ENO broadened the appeal of opera and mixed the age, ethnicity, and social background of ENO's audience by introducing radical ticketing schemes by offering free tickets for under-21s and subsidised tickets for under-35s (ENO being the only opera company in the world to offer such a scheme).

As a teenager, he played clarinet for the Leeds Youth Orchestra and Leeds Youth Opera.

== Early and personal life ==
Stuart grew up in Leeds, where his passion for classical music was sparked by playing the clarinet in Leeds Youth Orchestra and Leeds Youth Opera.

He attended St. Mary's Menston in West Yorkshire. He studied Political Geography at Clare College, Cambridge in 1990. He has two sons with his ex-wife. He is openly gay and first spoke publicly about his sexual orientation in a 2012 interview.

His partner, David Clews is Creative Director of TwoFour, and directed the BAFTA-award-winning Educating Essex.

== Career ==
He started his career as a tea boy at BBC Manchester working in DEF II programming. He then worked on shows such as Reportage, The Sunday Show, Fist of Fun, and Lifeswaps with Paul O'Grady. He later worked as a producer at MTV on Hanging Out with Davina McCall, and at the Big Breakfast. He re-joined the BBC to work for Jane Root in the Independent Commissioning Group, and later developed Radio One TV for Roly Keating, on UKTV.

He launched and ran UK Play, a music and comedy channel owned by UKTV from 1998.

In 2016 Murphy was made a Fellow of the Royal Television Society.

=== BBC Choice ===
In 2000, Murphy became the Head of Programmes at the BBC's digital entertainment channel BBC Choice, the forerunner to BBC Three, before being promoted to channel controller. Whilst at the channel, he commissioned the nightly entertainment news programme Liquid News.

=== BBC Three ===
Having been the controller of its predecessor, Murphy continued and was the first channel controller of BBC Three, which launched in February 2003 replacing BBC Choice. He commissioned comedies including Little Britain (which had been originally commissioned by BBC Radio 4), Pulling, and Early Doors as well as various dramas including Torchwood, and Conviction. He kickstarted parenting programming on TV, with Who Rules The Roost, Honey, We're Killing The Kids, Little Angels and The House of Tiny Tearaways both presented by Tanya Byron. Other commissioned shows included Flashmob The Opera (a live opera from Paddington station) and Flashmob The Opera: Meadowhall. He announced he was to step down from BBC Three in October 2005, with Julian Bellamy taking over as the second channel controller.

He was tipped as an outsider in the running for the controllership of BBC One in 2007. In 2004 The Observer included Murphy in a list of 80 young people who they believed would shape people's lives in the early 21st Century.

=== Commercial Broadcasters ===
After BBC Three he joined RDF Media in 2006 where he stayed for 11 weeks.

Between 2006 and 2008, he was the Creative Director of Twofour Broadcast.

== Sky1 ==
He joined Sky1 in May 2009 and commissioned a variety of drama, entertainment, and factual programmes including Got to Dance, Must Be the Music, A League of Their Own, Terry Pratchett's Going Postal, Strike Back, Mad Dogs, The Runaway, Little Crackers, Ross Kemp: Middle East Special, Pineapple Dance Studios, Louie Spence's Showbusiness, An Idiot Abroad, Trollied, Mount Pleasant, Spy, Stella, Starlings, among many others.

== Sky Atlantic ==
In November 2010 he was made Director of Commissioning across all Sky Entertainment channels. He was also given responsibility for launching Sky Atlantic, a new entertainment channel which is the home of the majority of HBO content in the UK. He bought Mad Men (previously at the BBC), Entourage (previously at ITV) as well as Blue Bloods and The Borgias. He commissioned screenwriter Paul Abbott to make Sky Atlantic's first drama, Hit & Miss, starring Chloë Sevigny, commissioned cult comedy This is Jinsy, brought Alan Partridge back to TV, commissioned Kathy Burke's Walking and Talking, Julia Davis's new comedy Hunderby, as well as documentary Flying Monsters with David Attenborough.

Sky Atlantic launched on 1 February 2011.

In May 2012, he was made Director of Entertainment Channels at Sky, overseeing all of the entertainment and commissioning portfolio.

In November 2015, he made the decision to leave Sky to pursue more creative endeavours, he has signed a deal to develop his own scripts with Sky Vision.

== English National Opera ==
In March 2018, Murphy was appointed Chief Executive of the English National Opera, where he worked with Annilese Miskimmon (joined 2020) and Martyn Brabbins on ENO's leadership team, a position he held until September 2023.

=== Free tickets scheme ===
As part of Murphy's 'seismic' mission to attract a younger audience to ENO, in December 2018 he announced free tickets for under-18s on Friday and Saturday nights in the balcony of the London Coliseum. He saw cost as a 'barrier to entry for under-18s" and by removing it helped to promote the idea that opera is not "elitist".

In May 2021, ENO's free tickets initiative was extended to under-21s for every night of the week and was not limited to specific seating, even "the most expensive stall seats".

Additionally, the discount has now been extended to under-35s, who are able to get some of the best seats for £35 and under by having an under-35 membership.

=== Controversy ===
His position at ENO has not been without criticism. In an article attacking ENO's 2019 decision to limit reviewers to a single free ticket as "morally wrong", opera gossip columnist Norman Lebrecht said Murphy "makes his predecessors seem reasoned and adept. He maintains you don’t have to know anything about opera in order to run an opera house. The damage of his thoughtless actions is already evident and the consequences may be lasting".

Murphy was appointed Commander of the Order of the British Empire (CBE) in the 2024 New Year Honours for services to opera.

Media offices
New creation	Controller of BBC Three; 2003–2006	Succeeded by Julian Bellamy
