= The Indestructibles (2006 TV series) =

- Starring: Jonathan Goodwin; Victoria Kruger; Jamie Hull; Richard Hull
- Narrated by: Paul Darrow
- Country of origin: United Kingdom
- No. of episodes: 10

Production
- Running time: 28 minutes

Original release
- Network: BBC Three
- Release: 3 October – 5 December 2006

The Indestructibles is a 2006 British documentary series made for the BBC.

The show involves four characters, Doc Damage, Data Girl and the Petri Twins, who experiment on themselves to uncover the secrets of the human body.

== Presenters ==
=== Doc Damage ===
Played by Jonathan Goodwin

The main character of the show who usually performs the stunts.

He puts his life on the line to figure out how the stunts work and tries to push his body to the limit.

=== Data Girl ===
Played by Victoria Kruger

A researcher who finds people who have done or been involved in body stunts and impressive shows of strength. Where possible, the stunt artists will be invited to demonstrate the feat. In other episodes, experts are brought in to describe and explain historical stunts.

=== The Petri Twins ===
Played by Jamie Hull & Richard Hull

A set of identical twin brothers who compete against each other in various challenges in which the brothers will attempt different approaches to the same task in an attempt to take advantage of their identical genetic composition. Often the challenges are related to the production of bodily fluids, including saliva and semen, or physically harming one another. The winner of each challenge is either given a reward or spared an undesirable forfeit.

The twins are identified by the colour of their shirt.

== Episodes ==
Season 1
No. in series	Title
1	"Helicopter Crash"
A news helicopter crashes into a roof in the middle of the city.
2	"Crushed by an SUV"
A car crash sends an SUV flying towards a pedestrian.
3	"15,000-Foot Freefall"
A skydiving instructor falls 15,000 after a double parachute malfunction.
4	"Mauled by Lions"
A zookeeper is attacked by lions at feeding time.
5	"Electrocuted Skydiver"
A skydiver crashes into a power line.
6	"Baby Car Crash"
An incident occurs while a father on a walk with his family.
7	"Lost at Sea"
A giant wave sends a man into an underwater cave.
8	"Seven Minutes Under Water"
A kayaker survives being stuck underwater for 7 minutes.
9	"Flying Car Crash"
A car crash breaks one car apart and sends another across the highway.
10	"High-Speed Bike Crash"
Professional speed biker, Éric Barone, crashes while riding down a volcano at 108 miles per hour.
