= Undercover Princes =

- Narrated by: Dawn Porter
- Country of origin: United Kingdom
- Original language: English
- No. of series: 2
- No. of episodes: 8

Production
- Executive producers: Nick Parnes; Adam Adler
- Running time: 60 minutes

Original release
- Network: BBC Three
- Release: 15 January – 5 February 2009

Undercover Princes is a BBC Three reality TV show which took three royal claimants from foreign cultures and placed them in Brighton where they had to 'live and date' like normal people. The idea for the programme came from the 1988 Eddie Murphy movie Coming to America.

The contestants were Remigius Jerry Kanagarajah, descendant to the royal family of the historical Jaffna Kingdom; Africa Zulu, a Zulu chief from South Africa; and Manvendra Singh Gohil of Rajpipla in north west India.

The three men lived in a house together and the primary focus is on their search for a 'princess' (or in Gohil's case, prince) in the UK whilst at the same time getting used to having to do things for themselves. All three ultimately failed to find a lasting relationship.

The series was narrated by Dawn Porter. A female counterpart, Undercover Princesses, was made.

== Ukrainian TV ==
In 2012 the Ukrainian TV channel 1+1 did a Ukrainian interpretation under the Russian title: "Принц желает познакомиться" with Prince Lorenzo de' Medici from Italy, Count Jacques von Polier from France, and Prince Daniel Nii Armah Tagoe from Ghana.
