= Peckham Finishing School for Girls =

British TV documentary series

- Country of origin: United Kingdom
- No. of episodes: 3

Production
- Running time: 60 minutes

Original release
- Network: BBC Three
- Release: 16 June – 6 July 2010

Peckham Finishing School for Girls is a British TV documentary series, broadcast in 2010 on BBC Three.

The series followed four young women from privileged families aged between 22 and 26, featuring Stephanie, Serena, Claire and Cat, as they travelled to Peckham to live with and experience the lifestyle of their new 'Peckham Sisters' Lashan, Kerri, Aleisha and Sarah, who come from much less affluent backgrounds. In the series, the Peckham neighbourhood is portrayed as rough and dangerous.
