= Ciara Watling =

Northern Irish footballer (born 1992)

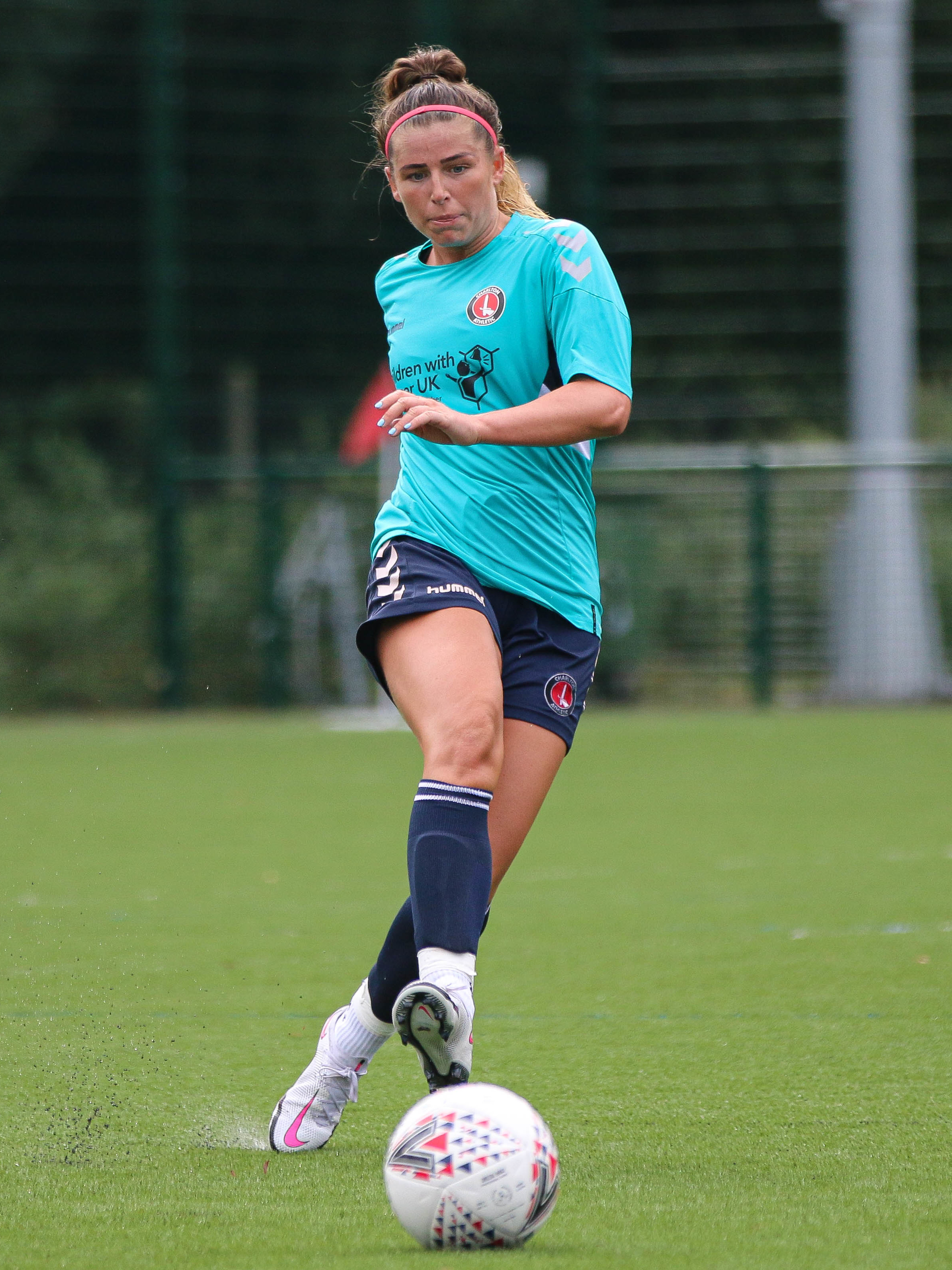
- Watling playing for Charlton in 2020

Personal information
- Full name: Ciara Alice Watling
- Date of birth: 18 August 1992 (age 34)
- Place of birth: Sidcup, England
- Height: 1.68 m (5 ft 6 in)
- Position: Midfielder

Team information
- Current team: Millwall Lionesses

Youth career
- Swanscombe
- 2007–2010: Charlton Athletic

Senior career*
Years	Team	Apps	(Gls)
2010–2012	Charlton Athletic	20	(0)
2012–2016	Millwall Lionesses	93	(22)
2016–2020	Crystal Palace	37	(8)
2020–2021	Charlton Athletic	15	(1)
2021–2023	Southampton	10	(6)
2024–	Millwall Lionesses	0	(0)

International career^{‡}
2015–	Northern Ireland	37	(0)
- * Club domestic league appearances and goals as of 09:52, 14 October 2021 (UTC) ‡ National team caps and goals as of 18:19, 23 February 2021 (UTC)

Ciara Alice Watling (née Sherwood; born 18 August 1992) is a Northern Irish professional footballer who plays as a midfielder for Millwall Lionesses.

== Club career ==
Watling joined Charlton Athletic at the age of 15 after a successful trial following recommendation from Keith Boanas, where she was awarded Player of the Season for the academy in her first season.

After a season with Charlton's first team, Watling went on loan to Millwall Lionesses before moving permanently. During the 2013–14 season, Watling captained the Millwall Lionesses Development Squad. Watling made her debut for the first team as a substitute against London Bees in the FA WSL Cup in May 2014. She made her first start two months later against Watford.

During the 2016 FA WSL mid-season transfer window, Watling left Millwall Lionesses by mutual agreement before signing for Crystal Palace for the 2016–17 season. Watling moved back to Charlton on January 15, 2020.

After her first full season with Charlton, Watling signed for Southampton in the FA Women's National League that summer. Following their successful promotion push in the 2021–22 season, she will play the 2022–23 season in the FA Women's Championship. At the end of the 2022–23 season, Watling left the club after agreeing to terminate her contract.

Ciara signed for Millwall Lionesses on 25 January 2024.

== International career ==
Watling made her debut for the Northern Ireland national team on 24 October 2015 against Georgia.

== Personal life ==
Watling is married to English football coach Harry Watling. She is a cousin of EastEnders actresses Jacqueline Jossa and Megan Jossa.
