= Megan Jossa =

English former actress (born 1996)

Megan Hailey Jossa
- Born: Megan Carmel Hollie Jossa; 29 January 1996 (age 30); Eltham, London, England
- Occupation: Actress
- Years active: 2006–2017
- Relatives: Jacqueline Jossa (cousin); Ciara Watling (cousin)

Megan Carmel Hollie Jossa (born 29 January 1996) is an English actress, known for playing Courtney Mitchell in the BBC One soap opera EastEnders in 2006.

== Career ==
Jossa played Courtney Mitchell in the BBC soap opera EastEnders from March to June 2006. Jossa has also appeared in The Bill, and played Amy in Coming of Age.

Jossa starred as Debbie in Billy Elliot the Musical at the Victoria Palace Theatre in the West End from 2008 until 30 May 2009 alongside British actor Tom Holland.

== Personal life ==
She is the cousin of EastEnders actress Jacqueline Jossa, who plays Lauren Branning.

== Awards ==
In 2006, Jossa was nominated for the Best Young Actor award at the Inside Soap Awards.

== Filmography ==
Year	Title	Role	Notes
2006	EastEnders	Courtney Mitchell	24 episodes
2007	The Bill	Annie Moore	Episode: "Daddy's Girl"
2008	Coming of Age	Amy	Episode: "We Have Been Naughty Haven't We?"
2009	The Take	Kim	4 episodes
2016–2017	Stage School	Herself	Main role

=== Theatre ===
- Billy Elliot (2008 - Victoria Palace Theatre, London)
