= Jacqueline Jossa =

English actress (born 1992)

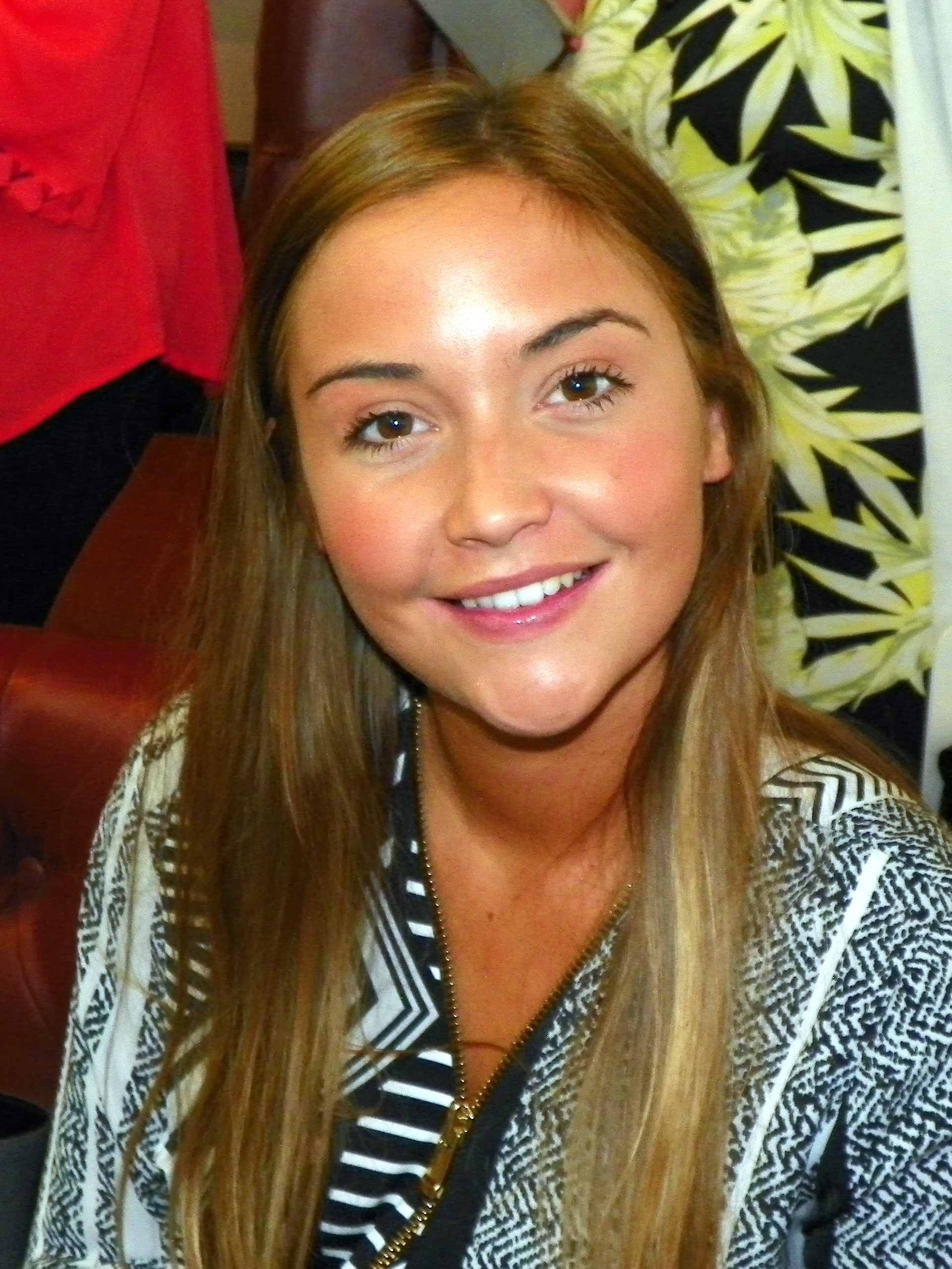
- Jossa in 2016
- Born: Jacqueline Mary Jossa; 29 October 1992 (age 33); Bexley, London, England
- Occupation: Actress
- Years active: 2010–present
- Spouse: Dan Osborne (m. 2017; sep. 2026)
- Children: 2
- Relatives: Megan Jossa (cousin); Ciara Watling (cousin)

Jacqueline Mary Osborne (née Jossa) (born 29 October 1992) is an English actress. She is known for portraying Lauren Branning in the BBC soap opera EastEnders since 2010. In 2019, Jossa won the nineteenth series of I'm a Celebrity...Get Me Out of Here!.

== Early life ==
Jacqueline Mary Jossa was born on 29 October 1992 in Bexley. She trained at D&B Theatre School in Bromley and later at the Royal Academy of Music in London. She has one older sister, Katrina, and two older brothers who died in infancy. She is the cousin of former EastEnders actress Megan Jossa. Her cousin, Ciara Watling, is a Northern Ireland international footballer.

== Career ==
=== EastEnders ===
Jossa was cast in EastEnders in 2010 as Lauren Branning, taking over the role from Madeline Duggan, who had portrayed the character since 2006. Her first appearance was on 27 September 2010. Jossa also appeared in Lauren's internet spin-off series, Lauren's Diaries, with two series in 2010 and 2011. In September 2017, it was revealed that Jossa would be leaving EastEnders after seven years alongside on-screen sister, Lorna Fitzgerald. Their exit was a decision made by the new temporary producer John Yorke. A spokesperson for the soap said, "We can confirm that Jacqueline and Lorna will be leaving EastEnders. They have both been wonderful to work with, and we wish them all the best for the future". Jossa's exit scenes aired on 16 February 2018.

Jossa returned to the show in December 2022 for the episode that saw the funeral of Lauren's step-grandmother Dot Cotton (June Brown), before departing again in the following episode. Jossa made a previously unannounced appearance in the episode broadcast on 22 June 2023 that accommodated the permanent return of Ian Beale and Cindy Beale, alongside Peter Beale, now played by Thomas Law. In October 2023, it was confirmed that Jossa would be returning to EastEnders permanently.

=== Other ventures ===
In 2013, she appeared as a panellist on the BBC Three comedy panel show Sweat the Small Stuff. In November 2019, Jossa was a contestant on the nineteenth series of the ITV reality TV show I'm a Celebrity...Get Me Out of Here!. She subsequently won the show, and was crowned 'Queen of the Jungle'. Jossa's current role includes advertising products on social media as an influencer. In June 2022, the Advertising Standards Agency publicly reprimanded her for not disclosing financial connections with advertisers.

== Personal life ==
On 24 June 2017, Jossa married television personality Dan Osborne. They have two daughters together, born in 2015 and 2018. The couple separated in March 2026.

== Filmography ==
=== Television ===
Year	Title	Role	Notes
2010–2018, 2022–present	EastEnders	Lauren Branning	Regular role
2010–2011	EastEnders: E20	Lauren Branning	Recurring role (series 1); guest (Series 2, 3)
2019	I'm a Celebrity...Get Me Out of Here!	Herself	Winner (season 19)
2026	Michael McIntyre's Big Show	Lauren Branning	1 episode

== Awards and nominations ==
Jossa was nominated for the 2011 TV Choice Awards for "Best Soap Newcomer". On 25 January 2012 Jossa won "Best Newcomer" at the National Television Awards. She was shortlisted in the category "Sexiest Female" in The British Soap Awards in 2012, 2013 and 2014 but lost to Michelle Keegan (Tina McIntyre) of Coronation Street. Jossa received the 2013 Inside Soap Award for Best Actress, nominated for Best Storyline in 2013 ("Lauren's struggle with alcohol"), and for four consecutive years (2013 to 2016) for 'Sexiest Female'.

Year	Ceremony	Award	Work	Result
2011	TV Choice Awards	Best Soap Newcomer	EastEnders	Shortlisted
2012	National Television Awards	Best Newcomer	EastEnders	Won
2012	All About Soap Awards	Best Dressed Soap Star	EastEnders	Shortlisted
2012	The British Soap Awards	Sexiest Female	EastEnders	Shortlisted
2012	Inside Soap Awards	Sexiest Female	EastEnders	Shortlisted
2012	Inside Soap Awards	Best Dressed Soap Star	EastEnders	Shortlisted
2013	National Television Awards	Serial Drama Performance	EastEnders	Longlisted
2013	All About Soap Awards	Best Stunt: Joey and Lauren's Crash	EastEnders	Shortlisted
2013	All About Soap Awards	Forbidden Lovers: Joey and Lauren	EastEnders	Shortlisted
2013	British Soap Awards	Sexiest Female	EastEnders	Shortlisted
2013	Inside Soap Awards	Best Actress	EastEnders	Won
2013	Inside Soap Awards	Sexiest Female	EastEnders	Shortlisted
2013	Inside Soap Awards	Best Storyline: Lauren's Struggle With Alcohol	EastEnders	Shortlisted
2014	British Soap Awards	Sexiest Female	EastEnders	Shortlisted
2014	Inside Soap Awards	Sexiest Female	EastEnders	Won
2015	Inside Soap Awards	Sexiest Female	EastEnders	Shortlisted
2016	Inside Soap Awards	Sexiest Female	EastEnders	Won
2025	National Television Awards	Serial Drama Performance	EastEnders	Shortlisted
2025	TVTimes Awards	Favourite Soap Actor	EastEnders	Nominated

Preceded by Harry Redknapp	I'm a Celebrity... Get Me Out of Here! Winner & Queen of the Jungle; 2019	Succeeded by Giovanna Fletcher (only as Winner as Giovanna is Queen of the Castle. Jill Scott as "Queen of the Jungle" )
