= Boom Town (2013 TV series) =

British television series

- Genre: Structured-reality television, comedy
- Written by: Scenario producers: Piers Torday; Christoper Davies; Ali Crockatt; David Scott
- Directed by: Hannah Springham
- Country of origin: United Kingdom
- Original language: English
- No. of series: 1
- No. of episodes: 6

Production
- Producer: Jonathan Stadlen
- Cinematography: Nick Martin
- Camera setup: Adrian Marciante
- Running time: 30 minutes
- Production company: Knickerbockerglory

Original release
- Network: BBC Three
- Release: 14 August – 18 September 2013

Boom Town is a structured-reality television and comedy sketch show series produced by independent company Knickerbockerglory for BBC. It first aired on BBC Three in August and September 2013. Directed by Hannah Springham and produced by Jonathan Stadlen, the series features a cast of eccentrics playing their own alter-egos, including their "own catchphrases, eccentricities and larger than life personalities".

== Concept ==
If all of Britain's most eccentric real-life people lived in the same place, then that town would be called "Boom Town". Everyone who appears in the show is completely real, featuring their real lives, passions and dialogue which are all their own.

However, some of the scenes have been "enhanced" for viewers' entertainment, and the way that the scenes are cut together pushes strongly on the conventions of a comedy sketch show.

== Main stars ==
Cast	Alter-Ego(s)	Location
Alan J. Jones	The Care Home Worker	
Anthony Youel	The Pub Landlord	The Monkey, Thurgoland, South Yorkshire
Cream (Kai Taylor)	The Rapper, Multi Award Winning Hip Hop Artist	Beaconsfield, Buckinghamshire
Dorota Lopatynska-de-Slepowron; Atonu Pal	The Actress & Exclusive Lady; The Husband & Manager	
Garth Delikan	The Life Coach	Chertsey, Surrey
Joel Hazeldene	The Trainspotter	Windsor, Berkshire
Jonny Na$h	The Ladies' Man	
Kevin Carlyon	The White Witch	St Leonards-on-Sea, East Sussex
Rebecca Wall; Roger Hayhurst (Radio presenters)	Knight Warriors (The Superheroes)	Salford, Greater Manchester
Louis Webb	The Stripper	Bexleyheath, South East London
Pablo Bubar (Actor)	The Romantic	
Stella Mushonga	The Fashion Designer	
Talina D'zyuban (Model, Actress)	The Temptress	

== Production ==
The series is scheduled to comprise six 30-minute episodes, produced by Jonathan Stadlen for Knickerbockerglory. It was commissioned for BBC Three by Zai Bennett, Controller and Karl Warner, Executive Editor, Entertainment of BBC Three. After commissioning a pilot in April 2012, Warner commented:

Boom Town will be the first sketch show to make stars out of real people. Some of the characters we've already met are laugh-out-loud funny and would sit well in any scripted comedy. BBC Three is always keen to try trying new things and this feels like an original proposition.

Although the residents may come from distinct parts of the UK, most of the scenes for many of them were shot in studios or contracted outside set locations, mostly in Southwest London. Outside the UK, Boom Town will be distributed by ITV Studios Global Entertainment, which showcased the series at MIPTV Media Market in Cannes, France, in April 2013.

== Reception ==
=== Critical reception ===
After commissioning a pilot in 2012, a year before its transmission, Paul Jensen, writing for Chortle, called Boom Town "the last straw" for his time of watching BBC Three. In its own review of episode 1, Chortle compared the programme to Channel 4's failed similar comedy project Kookyville, which, after the pilot was slated by critics, was not commissioned for a full series. Simon Horsford, writing for The Daily Telegraph, commented: "(it's) the kind of pointless series you might find on Channel 5 or E4 (in its bad days). Described as 'structured reality', Boom Town follows/mocks a collection of 'real-life' eccentrics." Yolanda Zappaterra for Time Out commented: "If you liked Fonejacker and You've Been Framed! you may like this, in which some very strange people use their own scripted dialogue in 'enhanced' scenes to create set-ups that range between uncomfortable viewing and a smile."

=== Ratings ===
Episode viewing figures from BARB.

Episode no.	Date	Total viewers	BBC Three weekly ranking
1	14 August 2013	Under 728,000	Not in Top 10
2	21 August 2013	Under 687,000	Not in Top 10
3	28 August 2013	Under 784,000	Not in Top 10
4	4 September 2013	Under 810,000	Not in Top 10
5	11 September 2013	Under	Not in Top 10
6	18 September 2013		Not in Top 10
