= Freak like Me (TV series) =

British reality television series

Freak Like Me is a British reality television series which ran for six episodes on BBC Three in 2010. In the series, comedian Russell Kane introduces members of the public who have eccentric habits, and speaks about his own odd habits.

== Content ==
Some of the odd habits of members of the public included always being naked while defecating, or collecting dead bees. Others blow-dried their entire bodies, ate meals in the bath, bite their toenails or eat from public bins. There was also a British teenager who wished to be a New York police officer, a man who wore new boxer shorts every day, and a woman who burst the acne of her boyfriend's back.

== Reception ==
In a scathing review, Tim Walker of The Independent found the guests' eccentricities to be exaggerated and Kane's habits – such as paying in exact money or washing up before dinner – to not be odd. He considered it to be unworthy of a 9 pm primetime slot, and the type of programme that makes people cancel their BBC licence fee.

A review in Metro was more positive, finding the show entertaining but deeming Kane's presenting as annoying and childlike.

== Notable guests ==
Christian Richardson, who wished to be an American police officer, changed his name to America Luke Richardson and later joined Greater Manchester Police as a special constable. He was dismissed in 2014 for stealing uniform and making unauthorised visits to schools. In 2016, he was jailed for five years for a series of child sexual offences. The Manchester Evening News shared a video of his Freak Like Me appearance after his conviction.
