= Zai Bennett =

British television executive

Zai Bennett (born 1974) is a television executive. He is CEO and Chief Creative Officer for BBC Studios' global content-making division BBC Studios Productions, a position he took up in November 2024. and former Managing Director of Content for Sky UK and Ireland, and former controller of BBC Three.

== Early life ==
Zai Bennett was educated at Goffs School, Hertfordshire and studied History and Politics BA and Modern History MA at the University of London.

== Career ==
Zai Bennett started his career in 1995 in the post room at Carlton Television, then worked as presentation scheduler for the launch of Channel 5 in 1997. He worked for ITV from 1998 in a number of roles including Head of Programme Strategy, ITV Digital Channels and ITV2 Programming and Acquisitions Manager. He was Controller of ITV2 from 2006 to 2009. In April 2010 he was appointed ITV's Director of Digital Channels and Acquisitions, where he was responsible for overseeing editorial content on ITV's digital channels (ITV2, ITV3, ITV4 and the CITV channel), including all commissioning and scheduling across the channels. In December 2010 the BBC announced he would become Controller of BBC Three in 2011.

In April 2014, after it was announced that BBC Three would become an online-only service, Bennett revealed he would be joining Sky Atlantic as the channel's director.

Zai was appointed to the role of Managing Director of Content in 2019 and was responsible for Sky’s portfolio of entertainment, cinema and children's services. Under his leadership, in 2020, Sky Arts became a free-to-air channel and Sky launched six new channels, including an entirely new factual division.

Media offices
Preceded by Danny Cohen	Controller of BBC Three; 2011–2014	Succeeded by Sam Bickley
