= BBC Three =

Television channel operated by the BBC

- Logo used since 2022
- Country: United Kingdom
- Broadcast area: United Kingdom; Isle of Man; Channel Islands
- Network: BBC Television; BBC One (2019–2022)
- Headquarters: London, England

Programming
- Language: English
- Picture format: 1080i/1080p (Note: 1080p25 sometimes only on Freeview) HDTV (downscaled to 576i for the SDTV feed)

Ownership
- Owner: BBC
- Sister channels: BBC One; BBC Two; BBC Four; BBC News; BBC Parliament; CBBC; CBeebies; BBC Scotland; BBC Alba

History
- Launched: 9 February 2003; 23 years ago (original); 1 February 2022; 4 years ago (relaunch)
- Replaced: BBC Choice (2003)
- Closed: 16 February 2016; 10 years ago (original)

Links
- Website: bbc.co.uk/bbcthree

Availability

Terrestrial
- Freeview: Channel 23 (SD); Channel 107 (HD; England and NI only); Channel 7 (Original)

Streaming media
- BBC iPlayer: Watch live (UK only)

BBC Three is a British free-to-air public broadcast television channel owned and operated by the BBC. The corporation's third flagship channel, it primarily broadcasts programmes targeting a teenage and young adult audience aged 16 to 34, including comedy, drama, reality, music and factual programmes focusing on youth-oriented topics and social issues. The channel broadcasts daily from 7:00 p.m. to 4:00 a.m., timesharing with CBBC (which starts at 7:00 a.m.).

BBC Three first launched on 9 February 2003, replacing the digital service BBC Choice; its original remit focused on "innovative" programming highlighting new talent, and an emphasis on interactivity via digital platforms. The original era of the channel was marked by multiple long-running comedies including Gavin & Stacey, Little Britain, Two Pints of Lager and a Packet of Crisps, and Being Human, as well as dramas such as the Doctor Who spin-off Torchwood.

In 2015, amid cuts to the BBC and a shift towards digital platforms among the demographic, it was announced that the BBC Three television channel would close in 2016, and that it would be relaunched as a digital content brand for young adult-oriented content across the BBC iPlayer and social media platforms. Operating under a reduced budget, new comedy, dramas, reality series and documentaries were commissioned for BBC Three on the iPlayer. In 2019, selected BBC Three programmes began airing in a branded late-night block on BBC One.

In March 2021, amid the success of programmes such as Fleabag, Normal People, and RuPaul's Drag Race UK, the BBC announced that it planned to relaunch BBC Three's linear television channel in 2022; the relaunch occurred on 1 February 2022, operating under a similar remit to its original incarnation. In October 2026, as part of cuts by the BBC, it was announced that the BBC Three television channel would close again in early 2027.

== History ==
=== Original run on linear television ===
Logo used from 2003 to 2008

Logo used from 2008 to 2016

In mid-2000, the BBC decided to reposition and rebrand their two digital channels so that they could be more closely linked to BBC One and BBC Two. Their plan was for BBC Knowledge to be replaced with BBC Four in May 2002, and for BBC Choice to be replaced with BBC Three. Stuart Murphy was appointed its controller on 8 December. However, questions were raised over the proposed format of the new BBC Three, as some thought the new format would be too similar to the BBC's commercial rivals, namely ITV2 and E4 at the time. It would be unnecessary competition. Whilst BBC Four, the BBC's proposed children's channels and digital radio stations all received approval, the BBC Three plans were rejected in September 2001.

The channel's proposal was approved on 17 September 2002, one year after its initial rejection, following a change to the remit of the channel where a 15-minute news programme and an altered target age range of 25–34 audiences. BBC Three was launched on 9 February 2003. The channel was launched by Stuart Murphy, who previously ran BBC Choice, and before that UK Play, UKTV's music and comedy channel that closed the year prior. At 33, Murphy was the youngest channel controller in the country, a title he had held since launching UK Play at the age of 26; although on 20 October 2005, it was announced that Murphy would leave the channel to work in commercial television. On 12 May 2011, BBC Three was added to the Sky EPG in the Republic of Ireland on channel 229. It was later moved to channel 210 on 3 July 2012, to free up space for new channels. Murphy's approach to BBC Three program commissioning was motivated by newness and experimentation, in order to win over the 16–34 year-olds who were watching Channel 4. Initially, BBC Three policy was that "every aspect of the production plan 'had to have new in it.'" This included the programme idea, the host, the filming and production style.

For the duration of the 2012 Summer Olympics, BBC Three increased its broadcasting hours to 24 hours to provide extra coverage of Olympic events. Broadcast hours were extended again for the 2014 Commonwealth Games with BBC Three broadcasting from 9:00 am to 4:00 am for the duration of the games. On 16 July 2013 the BBC announced that a high-definition (HD) simulcast of BBC Three would be launched by early 2014. The channel launched on 10 December 2013.

The fourth controller of the station, Zai Bennett, left to join Sky Atlantic in July 2014, and Sam Bickley became acting controller before being replaced by Damian Kavanagh.

=== Relaunch as a digital service ===
==== Proposal ====
In February 2014 at the Oxford Media Conference, BBC Director-General Tony Hall stated that as part of the "Delivering Quality First" initiative at the corporation (which, as motivated by the government freeze of television licence fee costs, aims to reach £700 million in cost-savings across the BBC up to the end of the 2016–2017 television season), the BBC was in the process of finalising plans to make another £100 million in cuts to be announced the following month. Believing that general budget cuts across the entire corporation would compromise the quality of its in-house productions, especially dramas, which he described as being the "essence" of the BBC, Hall stated that these cuts could require "hard decisions" to be made. He explained that the corporation had "reached the point where salami-slicing would affect quality and distinctiveness. Rather than seek to preserve a less good version of our past, we decided to focus on what we do best: from drama to taking iPlayer into the next generation."

On 5 March 2014, the BBC announced several cost-savings proposals, subject to the approval of the BBC Trust. Among them were plans to discontinue BBC Three as a television channel, and convert it into an online service. In its proposal, the BBC stated that while motivated by financial considerations, the conversion was a "future-facing move" that would "develop a ground-breaking new online service which will bring high quality, distinctive UK-originated long form and new form interactive content to 16–34 year olds", and take advantage of the increased use of online services by the channel's target demographics. It was outlined that the service would have to leverage the "strengths" of BBC Three, such as curation, original productions, and "best-in-class storytelling", and adapt them to the "immediacy" and interactivity of digital.

As the service would not be bound to the limitations of linear schedules, the scope of the BBC Three digital service would fall under three "editorial pillars" as opposed to programming genres: "Make Me Laugh" reflects comedic and "personality-driven" programmes, and "Make Me Think" reflects current affairs, drama, and other factual programming. A third pillar, "Give Me a Voice", reflects that the service's content would be of topical interest to the 16–34 year-old demographic, and would encourage discussion and participation especially through social media. The overall programming budget of the service would be reduced by nearly half in comparison to the BBC Three channel. While it would have a larger focus on short-form web series, the service planned to continue investments into commissioning long-form programmes and "comedy at near current levels", and serving as an incubator for new talent. The service's output would primarily be delivered through iPlayer, but plans called for a revised "branded space" to showcase the content, as well distributing short-form productions from alternative outlets such as YouTube.

When the BBC revealed the full detail in December 2014, it admitted there was widespread opposition from BBC Three viewers, but said there was support for the wider package of proposals. They believed the public would enjoy a BBC One +1 as it admitted "a vast majority of viewing" was still from linear television. The "Save BBC Three'" campaign disclosed this was a contradiction to what the BBC said about BBC Three. The BBC Trust began a 28-day public consultation regarding the plans on 20 January 2015 and it ended with a protest outside Broadcasting House. As part of the consultation a letter of 750 names against the move from the creative industry was sent to the BBC Trust, and was endorsed by a number of celebrities including Daniel Radcliffe, Aidan Turner, Olivia Colman and Lena Headey. The polling company ICM concluded a "large majority" of those that replied to the consultation were against the move, with respondents particularly concerned about those who cannot stream programming online, the effect of the content budget cuts, and the BBC's own admission the audience numbers would decrease. Jimmy Mulville and Jon Thoday of independent production companies Hat Trick Productions and Avalon reportedly considered legal action against the Trust if it continued with the closure of the channel. They had previously offered to buy the channel to keep it on television, but the BBC said the channel was not up for sale.

Media writer Roy Greenslade considered the change to be "unquestionably the most sensible or perhaps the least worst" way of cutting costs. While admitting BBC Three's success in targeting its demographic and its role as a launchpad for new talent, he argued that BBC Three was "a marginal channel with a small share of the overall television audience", and that "'Hard decisions' are just that. If the BBC is to have any hope of sustaining its quality core output then a sacrifice had to be made."

==== Approval and launch ====
Logo from 2016 to 2020

Logo used from 2020 to 2021

Logo used from 2021 to 2022

The transition was finalised by the BBC Trust in November 2015. The trust cited the shifting viewing habits of BBC Three's target audience from linear television to digital services, and that the discontinuation of BBC Three as a television channel would allow the BBC to "deliver more distinctive content online, while bearing down on costs". Conditions were imposed on other BBC properties to complement the changes; BBC One and Two were required to develop "distinctive programmes designed for younger audiences", as well as air repeats of all full-length programmes commissioned for BBC Three. The trust also approved related proposals to allow first-run and third-party content on iPlayer, and extend CBBC's broadcast day to 9:00 p.m. (CBBC signed off at 7:00 p.m. to conserve Freeview bandwidth for BBC Three) with a focus on an older youth audience.

On 4 January 2016, it was announced that the new BBC Three digital service would launch on 16 February 2016. BBC Three controller Damian Kavanagh explained that the digital service would feature the "same award-winning programmes freed from the constraints of linear TV", emphasising the ability to distribute content across "whatever format and platform is most appropriate". Hall described the internal atmosphere surrounding the new BBC Three as being like a "startup", explaining that "I love the feeling of going and being with Damian's team. It feels creative, energetic and mischievous as well, just as it should be." Kavanagh felt that the concise "pillars" of BBC Three, combined with its new structure, would give creators more flexibility and immediacy in how they produce content. He explained that "we can allow people to do things that I don't think other broadcasters can really do at the moment—in terms of giving people room to try things and also play around with form in a way we couldn't have done if we'd stayed on television", with the remainder of the BBC's content ecosystem as a "safety net". Kavanagh also emphasised a continued goal to use the service as an incubator for new talent, hoping that it would be remembered as "the place that spotted the next James Corden, the next Aidan Turner, the next whoever."

On 13 February 2016, prior to the service's launch, it was reported that the BBC was considering merging BBC Three and BBC Radio 1 under unified management if the digital BBC Three service is not successful. Kavanagh stated that he himself was unaware of this proposal, but added that BBC Three was "a really powerful youth brand with 13 years' heritage" and that he was debatable about the closure of a channel which "has that audience, and has that badge of quality, and has that heritage."

The BBC Three television channel formally signed off during the late-night evening of 15 February 2016, concurrent with the official relaunch of the new BBC Three a day later. The last programme aired was an episode of Gavin & Stacey, introduced by its co-star James Corden from the set of The Late Late Show in Los Angeles. The channel space continued to carry promotional information regarding the BBC Three online service, as well as a marathon of selected programmes from midnight, until it officially shut down on 31 March 2016.

=== Return to linear television ===
In March 2019, programmes from BBC Three began to be carried by BBC One from Monday to Wednesday after the BBC News at Ten under the name BBC Three on BBC One.

In May 2020, the BBC submitted its annual general plan for 2020–2021. It stated that the broadcaster was considering reinstating BBC Three as a linear channel with a doubled budget, citing that its content "now has the potential to reach a wider audience on a linear channel, as well as the key demographic which will continue to watch online." A number of series carried by the service, including Fleabag and Normal People, had achieved strong critical acclaim, with Fleabag in particular winning multiple Primetime Emmy Awards. Research released in September 2020 showed that BBC Three was being viewed for 89% less time per-year since the closure of its linear broadcast platform, and 72% if rebroadcasts of its content on other BBC linear channels were included. In the year after it closed its linear broadcast platform its weekly audience of viewers aged 16–34 declined 69% compared with the year before the closure.

On 2 March 2021, the BBC officially announced plans to reinstate BBC Three as a linear channel by January 2022, subject to approval by Ofcom. The channel returned to timeshare with the CBBC channel and broadcast from 7:00 p.m. to 4:00 a.m. nightly. There were pre-watershed programming targeting teenagers as part of the schedule.

On 16 September 2021, the UK media regulator Ofcom announced provisional approval for allowing BBC Three to return as a broadcast channel in 2022. As a public service channel it had the right to appear in the top 24 channels on EPGs. Sky complained that this would cause other channels to change their channel portions lower on the list to a less prominent position. On 25 November 2021, Ofcom announced it had given final approval for BBC Three to relaunch as a broadcast channel with a set period of February 2022, one month later than originally planned.

On 5 January 2022, CBBC returned to its pre-2016 hours and BBC Three began test broadcasts on 10 January 2022, prior to its relaunch on 1 February 2022. Following an introduction by Bimini Bon-Boulash, the relaunched channel's first programme was The Launch Party, a preview special hosted by BBC Radio 1's Clara Amfo and Greg James. This was followed by news programme The Catch Up, an Eating With My Ex celebrity special, and the premieres of RuPaul's Drag Race: UK vs. the World, Lazy Susan, and the documentary Cherry Valentine: Gypsy Queen and Proud.

On 8 September 2022, BBC Three, Four, and one of the BBC Red Button channels were suspended due to the death of Elizabeth II, in order to preserve bandwidth for the broadcast of news coverage and tribute programming on BBC One and Two.

=== Second closure of linear channel ===
On 20 October 2026, the BBC announced that it would close the BBC Three channel for the second time (alongside BBC Scotland and BBC Radio 4 Extra) as part of wide-ranging cuts across the broadcaster in early 2027. It will revert to an online-only service on iPlayer, and some of its programmes would continue being broadcast on BBC One.

== High definition ==
BBC Three HD logo (2013–2016)

A high-definition version of BBC Three launched on 10 December 2013, along with high-definition versions of BBC Four, BBC News, CBBC and CBeebies. The service initially closed in 2016, along with the BBC Three linear channel.

BBC Three HD was relaunched in 2022 to coincide with the channel's return to linear television. However, since the channel's closure and eventual relaunch, its bandwidth had been reallocated in Scotland (to BBC Scotland HD) and Wales (to an HD simulcast of S4C). As a result, BBC Three HD is only available on Freeview in England and Northern Ireland. The SD variant is freely available in all regions and BBC Three HD is universally available on Sky, Freesat, cable and online via BBC iPlayer.

== Controllers of BBC Three ==
- 2003–2006: Stuart Murphy
- 2006–2007: Julian Bellamy
- 2007–2010: Danny Cohen
- 2010–2014: Zai Bennett
- 2014: Sam Bickley
- 2014–2019: Damian Kavanagh
- 2019–present: Fiona Campbell

== Programming ==
The remit of BBC Three is to bring younger audiences to high quality public service broadcasting through a mixed-genre schedule of innovative UK content featuring new UK talent. The channel should use the full range of digital platforms to deliver its content and to build an interactive relationship with its audience. The channel's target is 16–34-year-olds.

— BBC Three Remit

The channel's target audience is 16–34-year-olds, and it faces heavy competition from rivals including ITV2 and E4, for an audience that the BBC has traditionally had difficulty in attracting. In 2008, it reached 26.3% of 16–34-year-olds in digital homes, the channel's highest ever such reach and above that of E4, ITV2, Dave and Sky 1.

On average, nine million people watched BBC Three every week, and it had a 2.6% share of the 15–34-year-old audience and 1.4% of the whole population, according to the Broadcasters' Audience Research Board (BARB). These ratings by BARB, the official ratings agency, average out BBC Three's viewing figures over a 24-hour period despite the channel only broadcasting in the evening, giving a distorted sense of the channel's viewership. Despite several official complaints from the BBC, BARB continued to publish figures which the BBC argued were unrepresentative.

BBC Three's programming consists of comedy, drama, spin-off series and repeated episodes of series from BBC One and BBC Two, and other programmes that attempted to alert others of their actions through a series of programmes challenging common beliefs.

An example of BBC Three's comedy output includes Little Britain, which in October 2004 broke its previous viewing record when 1.8 million viewers watched a new series. Little Britain was later broadcast on the BBC's terrestrial analogue channels BBC One and BBC Two. The channel's longest-running comedy programme is Two Pints of Lager and a Packet of Crisps, which ran for ten years, eight of which were on BBC Three (having previously aired on BBC Two and BBC Choice) and continued to be repeated on the channel several years after the show's conclusion. Some of the most popular comedy programmes on the channel in its original incarnation featured stand-up comedians performing their own take on a subject, usually the news, examples of which include Russell Howard's Good News (which later transferred to BBC Two, partly due to its success, and partly to BBC Three's move to online only) and Lee Nelson's Well Good Show.

=== Comedy and drama ===
The channel airs various comedies and dramas; one of its most popular sitcoms is Gavin & Stacey, which first aired in May 2007 and was written by and starred James Corden and Ruth Jones. The sitcom was an instant hit, with subsequent series being moved to other BBC channels and the show producing a Christmas special. Another example is Being Human, a comedy drama in which a ghost, a vampire and a werewolf share a flat, which became a success and heralded several new series. American programming were also imported for the channel, including American Dad! and Family Guy.

Numerous popular series were either repeated on the channel or have spin-offs created from them. In early 2003, viewers could watch episodes of BBC soap opera EastEnders on BBC Three before they were broadcast on BBC One. This programming decision coincided with the relaunch of the channel and helped it break the one million viewers milestone for the first time. An episode of EastEnders Revealed, which was commissioned for BBC Three and looking behind the scenes of the programme, attracted 611,000 viewers. In 2005, BBC Three commissioned the documentary series Doctor Who Confidential, which was shown immediately after episodes of the new series of Doctor Who had aired on BBC One. Another documentary was produced in July 2005, when it began to air repeats of both programmes.

In October 2005, it was announced that BBC Three had commissioned a spin-off drama series from Doctor Who, Torchwood, designed as a post-watershed science fiction drama for a more adult audience. Torchwood launched with 2.4 million viewers in October 2006. Torchwood is the first science fiction programme ever to have been commissioned by the channel, and its popularity led to it being broadcast on BBC Two for the second series, and on BBC One for subsequent series. In 2010, BBC Three began airing episodes of the fifth series of BBC drama series Waterloo Road after they had aired on BBC One as part of its "catch-up" programming. From January 2015, BBC Three aired the remaining episodes of Waterloo Road before being repeated on BBC One later the same day.

Among its original programming, the channel also gave viewers the comedy drama Pramface, which was written by Chris Reddy and comprised 19 episodes over three series, broadcast between 2012 and 2014.

=== Documentaries ===
BBC Three also aired several youth-focused documentaries, including Our War, Blood, Sweat and T-shirts (as well as its subsequent sequels), Life and Death Row and numerous films focused on mental illness. BBC Three also aired specialist factual documentaries, such as How Drugs Work and How Sex Works.

Stacey Dooley, since her appearance on Blood, Sweat and T-shirts in 2008, presented documentaries including Stacey Dooley in the USA (2012–2014), Coming Here Soon (2012), The Natives: This is our America (2017), Beaten by My Boyfriend (2015), Stacey Dooley in Cologne: The Blame Game (2016), Sex in Strange Places (2016), Stacey Dooley: Hate and Pride in Orlando (2016), Stacey Dooley on the Frontline: Girls, Guns and Isis (2016), Brainwashing Stacey (2016), Stacey Dooley: Face to Face with Isis (2018), and several other titles under the umbrella title Stacey Dooley Investigates (2009–present).

BBC Three also commissions a number of one-off documentaries, including Growing Up Down's (2014), My Brother the Islamist (2011), Small Teen Big World (2010); Stormchaser: The Butterfly and the Tornado (2012) and The Autistic Me (2009). Many were commissioned through BBC Three's FRESH scheme which provided an opportunity for "the next generation of directors" to make their first 60-minute documentaries for the channel.

In July 2022, a number of documentaries from the regional We Are England strand (featuring celebrities such as Bimini, Jayde Adams and Jassa Ahluwalia) were repeated on BBC Three, alongside a number of similarly formatted 30 minute documentaries, now produced to have a premiere showing on BBC Three. However, rather than being grouped under a master brand, like BBC One's We Are England or Our Lives programmes, these new documentaries are now listed under one-off titles such as Filthy Business and Queen of Trucks on the BBC iPlayer and in programme guides.

=== News and sport ===
In its original incarnation, BBC Three featured 60 Seconds, an hourly summary of news, sport and entertainment headlines. They were presented in a relaxed style in keeping with the rest of the channel. As part of the BBC's discussions with the government regarding the founding of the channel, a longer news programme had been promised to provide a daily section of news and current affairs. The News Show, as it was called at launch, was a Newsbeat-style fifteen-minute bulletin, later rebranded and reformatted as the more satirical and frivolous half hour The 7 O'Clock News. However, the BBC discontinued the bulletin in December 2005, following a recommendation made in the 2004 Barwise Report, which found that the channel's target audience sought news from elsewhere. With the 2022 relaunch of BBC Three, a new summary of news, sport and entertainment was launched under the name The Catch Up. This programme is also broadcast on the BBC News channel.

The channel has also aired sports programming. Match of the Day Live broadcast international football matches featuring Wales, often when an England match was being shown on BBC One. The channel also showed some matches of England's Women's team. The 2002, 2004, 2006 and 2008 Africa Cup of Nations tournaments were shown on the channel, while it aired the semi-finals and final of the 2021 edition.

=== Online ===
While the linear channel was suspended between 2016 and 2022, the BBC Three service was delivered primarily via iPlayer, offering new, original content, as well as full series of previous BBC Three programmes (branded as "Box Sets"). New content consisted of full-length programmes, and short-form web series and features; Kavanagh explained that the BBC Three digital service would focus primarily on original comedies and documentaries. All long-form programmes commissioned for BBC Three had to be aired at a later date on BBC One or BBC Two. In February 2019, it was announced that BBC Three programmes would air Mondays to Wednesdays on BBC One following the News at Ten, beginning on 4 March 2019.

Despite the refocus on comedy, the proportion of the channel's output (in minutes) devoted to comedy actually fell post-switch, from 41% to 33%. By contract, the proportions of the channel's output devoted to factual programming did increase.

BBC Three produced two curated content channels; The Daily Drop, which featured blogs, videos, photo galleries, social network content, and other content trending online, and The Best Of. 20% of the outlet's budget went towards web series.

Programmes from the original BBC Three channel continued on the digital service, including new series of Cuckoo, Life and Death Row and People Just Do Nothing. The initial slate of new programs to debut through BBC Three included the Doctor Who spin-off Class (which was cancelled after a single series), the dramas Clique and Thirteen, Live from the BBC, a stand-up comedy series focusing on up and coming comedians; the three-part web series The Man Who Witnessed 219 Executions; and Unsolved: The Boy Who Disappeared. Promoted as being a British equivalent to the web series Serial, Unsolved would feature weekly instalments investigating a real-life crime story. The service also produced a series of short films in collaboration with Idris Elba and up and coming talent. In 2017, the millennial relationship series Just a Couple premiered

With the service's budget cut to £30 million, some of BBC Three's historic staples, such as panel shows, Don't Tell the Bride, and American animated comedy Family Guy did not return on the digital service. Some BBC Three series had already been moved to other outlets in anticipation of the shutdown; Russell Howard's Good News was moved to BBC Two in 2014, and Don't Tell the Bride was moved to BBC One for a single series before being acquired by Sky One. ITV2 acquired rights to new episodes of Family Guy and other Seth MacFarlane series in March 2015, although the BBC continued to hold rights to older episodes of Family Guy until 2017.

The annual minutes of programming being made available by BBC Three on iPlayer after the channel closed its broadcast platform was around 80% less than the annual minutes of programming broadcast before the closure.

The comedy-drama Fleabag premiered on BBC Three in 2016, and was renewed for a second series premiering in 2019. The series achieved critical acclaim, with its second series receiving eleven nominations at the 71st Primetime Emmy Awards (on behalf of American co-production partner Amazon Prime Video) and winning in six categories, including Outstanding Comedy Series. The following year, Normal People received four nominations at the 72nd Primetime Emmy Awards (on behalf of American co-production partner Hulu).

In 2019, BBC Three premiered RuPaul's Drag Race UK, an adaptation of the American reality drag competition series RuPaul's Drag Race. In 2020, it was announced that BBC Three had acquired the UK broadcast rights to Canada's Drag Race.

=== List of series ===
==== General comedy ====
- Brain Candy (2003)
- 2004: The Stupid Version (2004)
- Three's Outtakes (2005–2010)
- Welcome To My World: Funny Business (2006)
- Conning The Conmen (2007)
- It's Adam and Shelley (2007)
- Two Pints of Lager: The Outtakes (2008–2011)
- The Wall (2008)
- Russell Howard's Good News (2009–2013)
- Special 1 TV (2010–2011)
- World's Craziest Fools (2011–2013)
- The Pranker (2011)
- World Series of Dating (2012)
- Unzipped (2012)
- BBC Comedy Feeds (2012–2015)
- Impractical Jokers UK (2012–2014)
- People Just Do Nothing (2014–2015)

==== One-off comedy pilots/specials ====
- Sort-It-Out-Man (2003)
- The Bunk Bed Boys (2004)
- Sweet and Sour (2004)
- From Bard to Verse (2004)
- Killing Time (2004)
- Hurrah for Cancer (2004)
- AD/BC: A Rock Opera (2004)
- 10:96: Training Night (2005)
- Marigold (2005)
- Cubby Couch (2006)
- Bash (2007)
- Living With Two People You Like Individually... But Not As A Couple (2007)
- Under One Roof (2007)
- Green (2007)
- Moonmonkeys (2007)
- Be More Ethnic (2007)
- Biffovision (2007)
- Splitting Cells (2007)
- Placebo (2008)
- Delta Forever (2008)
- Torn Up Tales (2008)
- Barely Legal (2008)
- MeeBOX (2008)
- LifeSpam: My Child Is French (2009)
- Ketch! And HIRO-PON Get It On (2009)
- Vidiotic (2009)
- Things Talk (2009)
- Brave Young Men (2009)
- Mark's Brilliant Blog (2009)
- May Contain Nuts (2009)
- The Site (2009)
- Above Their Station (2010)
- This Is Jinsy (2010)
- Laughter Shock (2010)
- Stanley Park (2010)
- Dappers (2010)
- The Inn Mates (2010)
- The Klang Show (2010)
- The Adventures Of Daniel (2010)
- D.O.A. (2010)
- Chris Moyles' Comedy Empire (2012)
- The Comedy Marathon Spectacular (2012)
- An Idiot's Guide To Politics (2015)
- The Totally Senseless Gameshow (2015)

==== Sketch comedy ====
- 3 Non-Blondes (2003)
- Monkey Dust (2003–2005)
- Little Britain (2003–2004)
- The Comic Side of 7 Days (2005)
- High Spirits with Shirley Ghostman (2005)
- Tittybangbang (2005–2007)
- Man Stroke Woman (2005–2007)
- The Message (2006)
- Touch Me, I'm Karen Taylor (2006–2008)
- Little Miss Jocelyn (2006)
- Comedy Shuffle (2007)
- Rush Hour (2007)
- Marc Wootton Exposed (2008)
- Scallywagga (2008–2010)
- The Wrong Door (2008)
- Horne & Corden (2009)
- La La Land (2010)
- Lee Nelson's Well Good Show (2010–2011)
- Wu-How: The Ninja How To Guide (2010)
- One Non Blonde: Down Under (2010)
- The Revolution Will Be Televised (2012–2015)
- Lee Nelson's Well Funny People (2013)
- Boom Town (2013)
- Lazy Susan (2022–present)

==== Comedy gameshow ====
- Celebdaq (2003)
- HeadJam (2004)
- Stars in Fast Cars (2005–2006)
- Rob Brydon's Annually Retentive (2006–2007)
- The King is Dead (2010)
- 24 Hour Panel People (2011)
- Sweat the Small Stuff (2013–2015)

==== Sitcom ====
- Swiss Toni (2003–2004)
- Two Pints of Lager and a Packet of Crisps (2003–2011)
- Grass (2003)
- Nighty Night (2004)
- 15 Storeys High (2004)
- Catterick (2004)
- Cyderdelic (2004)
- Coupling (2004)
- The Mighty Boosh (2004–2007)
- The Smoking Room (2004–2005)
- My Life In Film (2004)
- Ideal (2005–2011)
- I'm with Stupid (2005–2006)
- Snuff Box (2006)
- Grownups (2006–2009)
- Live!Girls! present Dogtown (2006)
- Pulling (2006–2009)
- Thieves Like Us (2007)
- Gavin & Stacey (2007–2008, 2022–present)
- Coming of Age (2007–2011)
- The Visit (2007)
- How Not to Live Your Life (2007–2011)
- Lunch Monkeys (2008–2011)
- Trexx and Flipside (2008)
- Massive (2008)
- Clone (2008)
- Off the Hook (2009)
- We Are Klang (2009)
- The Gemma Factor (2010)
- Mongrels (2010–2011)
- Him & Her (2010–2013)
- White Van Man (2011–2012)
- Pramface (2012–2014)
- Dead Boss (2012)
- Bad Education (2012–2014; 2022–2024)
- Cuckoo (2012–2014; 2022)
- Some Girls (2012–2014)
- Way to Go (2013)
- Bluestone 42 (2013)
- Badults (2013–2014)
- Uncle (2014–2015)
- Siblings (2014–2016)
- Crims (2015)
- Murder in Successville (2015)
- Top Coppers (2015)
- Fried (2015)
- Together (2015)
- Josh (2015)
- Ladhood (2019–2022)
- Peacock (2022–present)
- PRU (2022–present)
- Funboys (2025–present)

==== Comedy drama ====
- Grease Monkeys (2003–2004)
- Spine Chillers (2003)
- Outlaws (2004)
- Twisted Tales (2005)
- Casanova (2005)
- Funland (2005)
- Drop Dead Gorgeous (2006–2007)
- Sinchronicity (2006)
- Phoo Action (2008)
- Being Human (2008–2013)
- The Last Word Monologues (2008)
- Personal Affairs (2009)
- Mouth to Mouth (2009)
- Becoming Human (2011)
- Wreck (2022–present)
- Boarders (2024–present)

==== Live music and stand-up comedy ====
- Paul and Pauline Calf's Cheese and Ham Sandwich (2003)
- Glastonbury Festival (2003–2015)
- The Fast Show Farewell Tour (2003)
- Eurovision Song Contest Semi-finals (2004–2015, 2022)
- 28 Acts in 28 Minutes (2005)
- MOBO Awards (2006–2013)
- The Mighty Boosh Live (2008)
- Russell Howard Live (2009)
- Edinburgh Comedy Fest Live (2010–2014)
- Russell Howard Live: Dingledodies (2010)
- Three@TheFringe (2011)
- Simon Amstell: Do Nothing Live (2011)
- Stand Up For Sport Relief (2012)
- Live at the Electric (2012–2014)
- Chris Ramsey's Comedy Fringe (2012)
- Greg Davies Live: Firing Cheeseballs At A Dog (2012)
- Russell Howard: Right Here, Right Now (2012)
- Russell Kane: Smokescreens & Castles (2012)
- Lee Nelson Live (2013)
- Seann Walsh's Late Night Comedy Spectacular (2013–2014)
- Kevin Bridges – The Story Continues (2013)
- Jack Whitehall Live (2013)
- Nick Helm's Heavy Entertainment (2015)

==== Drama ====
- Burn It (2003)
- Bodies (2004–2006)
- Conviction (2004)
- Torchwood (2006)
- West 10 LDN (2008)
- Dis/Connected (2008)
- Spooks: Code 9 (2008)
- Personal Affairs (2009)
- Lip Service (2010–2012)
- Frankenstein's Wedding (2011)
- The Fades (2011)
- In the Flesh (2013–2014)
- Orphan Black (2013–2015)
- Murdered by My Boyfriend (2014)
- Our World War (2014)
- Waterloo Road (2015)
- Tatau (2015)
- Red Rose (2022)
- Mood (2022–present)
- Life and Death in the Warehouse (2022–present)

==== Documentary ====
- Appleton On Appleton (2003)
- Dreamspaces (2003–2004)
- Liquid Assets (2003–2004)
- Fatboy Slim: Musical Hooligan (2003)
- Body Hits (2003)
- Posh & Becks' Big Impression: Behind the Scenes & Extra Bits (2003)
- Mind, Body & Kick Ass Moves (2004)
- Destination Three (2005)
- Spendaholics (2005–2008)
- Doctor Who Confidential (2005–2011)
- Generation Jedi (2005)
- Forty Years of F*** (2005)
- Kick Ass Miracles (2005)
- F*** Off I'm Fat (2006)
- Japanorama (2006–2007)
- The Indestructibles (2006)
- Torchwood Declassified (2006)
- Most Annoying People (2006–2011)
- Freaky Eaters (2007–2009)
- Body Image (2007)
- Castaway: The Last 24 Hours and Castaway Exposed (2007)
- Kick Ass in a Crisis (2007)
- The Bulls**t Detective (2007)
- Say No to the Knife (2007)
- Pranks Galore (2007)
- The Most Annoying TV We Hate to Love (2007)
- The Most Annoying Pop Songs We Hate To Love (2007)
- Find Me the Face (2008)
- The Mighty Boosh: A Journey Through Time and Space (2008)
- Blood, Sweat and T-shirts (2008)
- Alesha: Look But Don't Touch (2008)
- The Most Annoying Couples We Love to Hate (2008)
- Gavin and Stacey 12 Days of Christmas (2008)
- Two Pints: Fags, Lads and Kebabs (2009)
- Comic Relief's Naughty Bits (2009)
- Two Pints: The Love Triangle (2009)
- Blood, Sweat and Takeaways (2010)
- The Autistic Me (2009)
- Stacey Dooley Investigates (2009–2015)
- My Life as an Animal (2009)
- Great Movie Mistakes (2010–2012)
- Blood, Sweat and Luxuries (2010)
- Peckham Finishing School for Girls (2010)
- Small Teen Big World (2010)
- Great TV Mistakes (2010)
- Sun, Sex and Suspicious Parents (2011–2015)
- Pop's Greatest Dance Crazes (2011)
- My Brother the Islamist (2011)
- Stormchaser: The Butterfly and the Tornado (2011)
- Stacey Dooley in the USA (2012–14)
- Coming Here Soon (2012)
- Unsafe Sex in the City (2012)
- Websex: What's the Harm? (2012)
- People Like Us (2013–2014)
- Hotel of Mum and Dad (2013–2014)
- Cherry Healey: Old Before My Time (2013)
- Doctor Who: Greatest Monsters & Villains (2013)
- Tough Young Teachers (2014)
- Growing Up Down's (2014)
- Junior Paramedics (2014)
- Life and Death Row (2014)
- Invasion of the Job Snatchers (2014)
- My Brother the Terrorist (2014)
- Tyger Takes On... (2014–2015)
- Excluded: Kicked Out of School (2015)
- Bangkok Airport (2015)
- Beaten by my Boyfriend (2015)
- Traffic Cops (2016)
- Sex in Strange Places (2016)
- We Are England (2022)
- Doctor Who: Unleashed (2023–present)

==== Chat show ====
- This Is Dom Joly (2003)
- The Graham Norton Effect (2005)
- Lily Allen and Friends (2008)
- Comic Relief's Big Chat With Graham Norton (2013)
- Backchat with Jack Whitehall and His Dad (2013–2014)
- Staying In With Greg & Russell (2013)

==== Repeats ====
- The Murder Game (2003)
- Angry Kid (2003)
- Absolutely Fabulous (2003)
- EastEnders (2003–2016, 2022–present)
- Spooks (2003–2009)
- Doctor Who (2005–2016, 2023–present)
- Top Gear (2006–2016, 2022–present)
- The Apprentice (2006, 2011–2013, 2024–present)
- That Mitchell and Webb Look (2006–2010)
- Giving You Everything (2008)
- Wallace & Gromit's Cracking Contraptions (2008–2009)
- The Voice UK (2012–2015)
- Live at the Apollo (2015–2016)
- Fleabag (2022–present)
- This Country (2022–present)
- Killing Eve (2022–present)
- Back to Life (2022–present)
- Waterloo Road (2015, 2023–present)
- Champion (2023–present)
- Planet Earth (2023–present)

==== Unscripted and reality ====
- The 7 O'Clock News (2003–2005)
- Re:covered (2003)
- Liquid News (2003–2004)
- The Bachelor (2003–2005)
- 60 Seconds (2003–2016)
- Little Angels (2004–2006)
- Slam Poets (2004)
- The House of Tiny Tearaways (2005–2007)
- The Real Hustle (2006–2012)
- Anthea Turner: Perfect Housewife (2006–2007)
- The Apprentice: You're Fired! (2006)
- Celebrity Scissorhands (2006–2008)
- The Baby Borrowers (2007)
- Kill It, Cook It, Eat It (2007–2010)
- Comic Relief Does Fame Academy (2007)
- Last Man Standing (2007–2008)
- Don't Tell the Bride (2007–2014)
- Bizarre ER (2008–2011)
- Snog Marry Avoid? (2008–2013)
- Britain's Missing Top Model (2008)
- Make My Body Younger (2008–2009)
- The World's Strictest Parents (2008–2011)
- Undercover Princes (2009)
- Young, Dumb and Living Off Mum (2009–2011)
- Freak Like Me (2010)
- I Believe in UFOs: Danny Dyer (2010)
- Hotter Than My Daughter (2010–2011)
- Dancing on Wheels (2010)
- Nicola Roberts: The Truth About Tanning (2010)
- Undercover Princesses (2010)
- Are You Fitter Than a Pensioner? (2010)
- Junior Doctors: Your Life in Their Hands (2011–2013)
- The Call Centre (2013–2014)
- Sexy Beasts (2014)
- Hair (2014)
- Killer Magic (2014–2015)
- Life Is Toff (2014)
- South Side Story (2015)
- I Survived a Zombie Apocalypse (2015)
- Asian Provocateur (2015)
- RuPaul's Drag Race: UK vs the World (2022–present)
- The Catch Up (2022–present)
- The Fast and the Farmer(ish) (2022–present)
- Hungry For It (2022–present)
- The Drop (2022–present)
- Gassed Up (2022–present)
- Love In The Flesh (2022–present)
- Charlotte in Sunderland (2023–present)
- I Kissed a Boy (2023–present)
- I Kissed a Girl (2024–present)

==== Imports ====
- 24 (2003)
- Taken (2003)
- The Practice (2004)
- The Office: An American Workplace (2005)
- Family Guy (2006–2016)
- American Dad! (2007–2016)
- Assy McGee (2007–2009)
- Jonah from Tonga (2014)
- Devin (2010)
- The Next Step (2022)
- Ghosts (airing as Ghosts US) (2022–present)
- SpongeBob SquarePants (2025–present)
- Top Gear (airing as Top Gear America) (2023–present)
- The Traitors (airing as The Traitors US) (2023–present)
- Love, Victor (2023)
- Crazy Fun Park (2023) (Note: Originally set to be broadcast on CBBC, but was reclassified before broadcast as a BBC Three programme.)
- Gremlins: Secrets of the Mogwai (2023)

=== Most watched programmes ===
The following is a list of the ten most watched broadcasts on BBC3 since launch, based on data supplied by BARB. Number of viewers does not include repeats. In January 2024, an update was made to how the top 50 programmes are reported. This includes viewing in television and non-television homes. This includes repeats that aired within the reporting week and to the same broadcaster group have been aggregated since this date, whereas this was reported separately before.

Rank	Programme	Viewers	Date
1	EastEnders Live: The Aftermath	4,537,000	19 February 2010
2	Olympics 2012	4,289,000	11 August 2012
3	Olympics 2012	2,771,000	1 August 2012
4	Torchwood	2,510,000	22 October 2006
5	Torchwood	2,498,000	22 October 2006
6	Olympics 2012	2,368,000	29 July 2012
7	Thailand: The Dark Side of Paradise	2,361,000	8 September 2025
8	EastEnders: Backstage Live	2,257,000	20 February 2015
9	Olympics 2012	2,162,000	4 August 2012
10	Match of the Day Live	2,069,000	26 June 2013

== Presentation ==
One of the "Blobs" idents used between 2003 and 2008

The Discovery package was used between October 2013 and January 2016, prior to the channel's online move.

The channel's original idents were conceived by Stefan Marjoram at Aardman Animations and were used from launch until February 2008. Stuart Murphy was touring Aardman Animations looking for new programming ideas for BBC Three when he spotted the cone shaped creatures. He then took the idea back to the Lambie-Nairn agency, responsible for the BBC Three identity package. A feature of this identity is also the song "Three Is a Magic Number", with only the lyrics copied, based on Schoolhouse Rock!.

BBC Online provided a number of downloads and activities based on the channel's identity: these included "BlobMate", screensavers, wallpapers and also games such as BlobLander and BlobBert. The idea used by both Lambie-Nairn, who had developed the branding for CBeebies and CBBC, and Aardman, was to create the BBC Three blobs as a relation to the green and yellow blobs of the children's channels. Kieron Elliott, Dean Lydiate, Duncan Newmarch, Lola Buckley, Gavin Inskip and Jen Long provided out-of-vision continuity.

On 22 January 2008 a new channel identity was unveiled, which began to be used on 12 February. Rebranding was produced by Red Bee Media, along with agencies MPG and Agency Republic with music and sound design by creative audio company Koink.

In October 2013, BBC Three introduced a new series of idents with a theme of "discovery". Designed by Claire Powell at Red Bee Media, the idents utilised projection mapping effects. The soundtrack for the idents was composed by Chris Branch and Tom Haines at Brains & Hunch.

On 4 January 2016, alongside the announcement of the date for BBC Three's relaunch as an online-only service, a third logo was unveiled. Inspired by the iconography of mobile apps, the new logo incorporated the Roman numeral for the number three, with the third bar replaced by an exclamation mark. Marketing head Nikki Carr explained that the three bars represented the three principles of BBC Three as a service; making viewers "think", "laugh", and have a voice. The new logo received mixed reactions from the public, with some drawing comparisons to the album cover of Plan B's Ill Manors, a Roman numeral "2" with an exclamation point ("BBC 2!"), and a proposed redesign of the BBC's logo seen in an episode of the mockumentary series W1A. In regards to the W1A comparison, Carr joked that "thanks to W1A we're cursed at the BBC when it comes to marketing and I don't want to come across all Siobhan Sharpe but forgive me some lingo." The channel also parodied the comparisons in a Vine video.

The "tricon" was used as the service's primary logo until 2020, when a more conventional logo box was adopted, connecting and modifying the "T" and "H" in "Three" to resemble the tricon emblem. In October 2021, this wordmark was replaced with one in the BBC's corporate font "Reith Sans" as part of a larger rebranding of the BBC's television channels. The tricon remained in use as a secondary logo, such as in an ident used to present BBC Three programmes on BBC One after the rebrand.

With the service's linear relaunch in February 2022, BBC Three adopted a new identity developed by Superunion and BBC Creative, with idents featuring three animated, pink and purple-coloured hands named "Captain", "Spider", and "Pointer" interacting in a lime green backdrop. The channel's presentation features the hands "irreverently [observing] what's going on in popular culture and young people's lives".

== Awards ==
The channel has received critical success and popularity for its programmes. In 2017, it won Broadcast Magazine's Digital Channel of the Year Award for Best General Entertainment Channel, and MGEITF Non Terrestrial Channel of the Year.

In 2008, BBC Three's Gavin & Stacey won the BAFTA Audience Award and Best Comedy Performance was awarded to James Corden for his role.

== Criticism ==
The channel has received criticism from several corners, the most prominent of which came from some of the BBC's long-standing presenters. These included John Humphrys, who argued that BBC Three and BBC Four should be shut down in the face of budget cuts to BBC Radio 4's Today programme, which he presented, as well as Jeremy Paxman.

In July 2010 a UK music magazine printed a letter from the pressure group Friends of Radio 3 that criticised BBC Three for having "comedies, game shows, films and documentaries, but no arts programming at all". In a later issue another correspondent endorsed this assessment on the basis of a search through issues of the Radio Times, and cast doubt on the BBC's claim (in the document Performance Against Public Commitments 2009/10) that the channel broadcast "54 hours of new music and arts programming" in that year. Two months later the same correspondent wrote in to inform readers that the BBC had refused his "Freedom of Information" request concerning the titles of the programmes used in calculating the "54 hours" total.
