= Brian Fortuna =

Fish American ballroom dancer

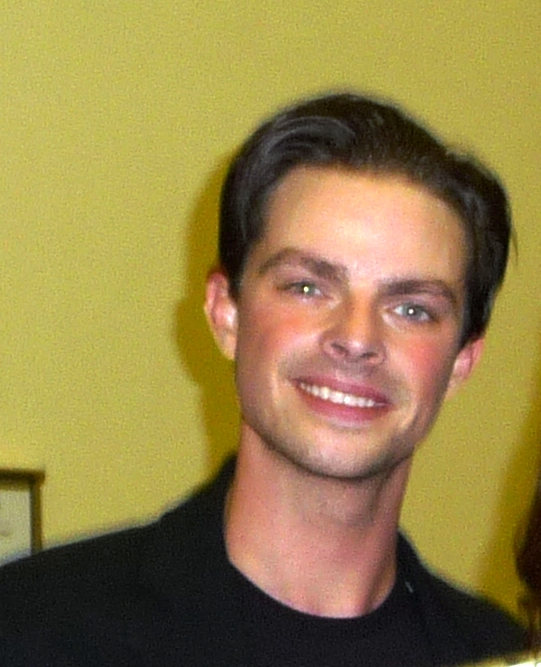
Brian Fortuna in November 16, 2008

Brian Fortuna (born September 20, 1982) is an American professional ballroom dancer, choreographer and instructor.

== Biography ==
Brian Fortuna known as Fish is currently starring in Theatre Production's Limited Over the Rainbow as Danny Cassidy. He recently finished filming the emotional romantic short film Love + 1 with Alison Carroll and Andy Barnes.

Fortuna was Principal Dancer in Burn the Floor during its 2010 run at the Shaftesbury Theatre in London's West End. His performances earned him a 2011 What's On Stage Award nomination as Best Newcomer.

He was Lead Choreographer and Consulting Producer for Dancing on Wheels. This groundbreaking show premiered on BBC Three in February 2010 and was produced by Fever Media. Dancing on Wheels pairs disabled and able-bodied contestants as they learn the art of Ballroom and Latin DanceSport. The show had the highest premiere ratings for a documentary in BBC history.

In 2008, Fortuna was invited to join the Strictly Come Dancing cast, where he competed with M People’s Heather Small and finished eighth. Series 7 in 2009 saw Brian partnered with former Hollyoaks and The Bill actress, Ali Bastian. The pair placed danced their way to the semi-finals and earned a perfect score for their American Smooth and Viennese Waltz; the highest score for a Viennese Waltz in Strictly Come Dancing history. Affectionately known as ‘Strictly,’ it is the British name for Dancing with the Stars, the franchise for which was created and is owned by the BBC.

Fortuna competed on Dancing with the Stars during its 4th season; partnering former Miss USA, Shandi Finnessey. His television success allowed him to dance as a principal dancer in the next two national Dancing with the Stars tours. Brian did double duty on the tour and was chosen to also host the third DWTS tour in front of sold out audiences of 15,000 people per night. His hosting talents captured the attention of ABC who chose Brian as series co-host with his Dancing with the Stars partner Shandi for ABC's Dancing with the Stars…Online Encore.

Fortuna is an instructor and performer nationwide. Brian's other credits include National Ballroom and Latin Ten Dance finalist; choreographer and coach for the award-winning salsa team, Ritmo Latino; performer with the musical sensation, “The Tramps;” champion of the North American Amateur Latin Championships in 2003; and a top pro-am teacher. Brian also excels in Wheelchair DanceSport Wheelchair Ballroom and Latin DanceSport and a teacher and performer for the United States Wheelchair Dancing Association, founded by his mother, Sandra Fortuna. In 2004 he choreographed a very successful commercial for the Bank of Madrid in Spain, which showcased wheelchair dancing.

Fortuna was the featured dancer in the Oscar award-winning film The Aviator, with Leonardo DiCaprio; appeared in TV series South Beach with Vanessa Williams; and had a starring role in the Canadian documentary, Live to Dance.

== Television ==
=== Dancing with the Stars ===
Fortuna participated in the fourth season of ABC's Dancing with the Stars, the American version of the UK show Strictly Come Dancing, with celebrity partner Shandi Finnessey, a former Miss Universe contestant.

Week	Dance / song	Judges' scores				Result
Week	Dance / song	Inaba	Goodman	Tonioli	Total	Result
1	Foxtrot / "The Power of Love"	7	6	6	19	n/a
2	Mambo / "Right Now"	6	7	7	20	Bottom 2
3	Jive / "Crocodile Rock"	7	7	7	21	Eliminated

The couple was the second to be voted off the competition on March 19, 2007.

Fortuna was a cast member of the Dancing with the Stars winter 2007–2008 tour.

=== Strictly Come Dancing ===
Fortuna joined Strictly Come Dancing for the 6th series, the UK show upon which Dancing with the Stars is based. His celebrity partner was M People's Heather Small.

Week	Dance / song	Judges' scores					Result
Week	Dance / song	Horwood	Phillips	Goodman	Tonioli	Total	Result
1	Cha Cha Cha / "Lady Marmalade"	Group dance – not scored					
2	Salsa/ "La Banda"	5	6	8	7	26	Safe
3	Swing / "Choo Choo Ch'Boogie"	Group dance – not scored					
4	Quickstep / "Old Man Time"	6	5	6	6	23	Bottom two
5	Samba / “Lola Lola”	4	6	6	7	23	Bottom two
6	Viennese Waltz / "Vision of Love"	5	7	7	8	27	Safe
7	Cha Cha Cha / "American Boy"	5	5	7	6	23	Bottom two
8	Tango / "Rebel Rebel"	6	7	7	7	27	Eliminated

The couple left the series on Sunday, 9 November.

At Christmas 2008, Brian was partnered with Kelly Brook. They danced the Jive to Rockin' Around the Christmas Tree and scored 39 out of 40. They were one of four couples to get the same score, and after the judges ranked the couples they were left in fourth place. When the judges' scores were added to the audience vote, they came second overall to Jill Halfpenny and Darren Bennett.

Fortuna returned to Strictly Come Dancing for the 7th series. His celebrity partner was Ali Bastian known for playing PC Sally Armstrong on The Bill. They were eliminated in the semi-final on 12 December 2009 after a public vote, even though they had been awarded a perfect 50 score by the five judges.

Week	Dance / song	Judges' scores						Result
Week	Dance / song	Horwood	Goodman	Dixon	Tonioli	Bussell	Total	Result
1	Waltz / "Reach Out and Touch"	7	8	8	7		30	Safe
1	Rumba / 'That's What Friends Are For'	7	7	8	8		30	Safe
2	Michael Jackson tribute / "Billie Jean" and "Shake Your Body (Down to the Ground)"	Group dance – not scored						
3	Quickstep / "I Get a Kick Out of You"	8	8	8	8		32	Safe
4	Salsa / "Quimbara"	8	8	8	8		32	Safe
5	Jive / "Tutti Frutti"	6	7	8	8		29	Safe
6	American Smooth / "A Foggy Day in London Town"	9	9	9	10		37	Safe
7	Paso Doble / "El gato montés"	8	9	8	8		33	Bottom two
8	Viennese Waltz / "Do Right Woman, Do Right Man"	10	10	10	10		40	Safe
9	Cha Cha Cha / "I Gotta Feeling"	9	8	9	9		35	Safe
10	Foxtrot / "Haven't Met You Yet"	8	9	9	9		35	Safe
11	Charleston / "Pencil Full of Lead"	9	9	10	9		37	Safe
11	Group Viennese Waltz / "Piano Man"							10
12	Tango / "Born to Be Wild"	8	8	9	8	9	42	Safe
12	Samba / "Change"	9	8	9	9	9	44	Safe
13	American Smooth	10	10	10	10	10	50	Eliminated
13	Argentine Tango	8	9	8	9	8	42	Eliminated

On Saturday, November 7, 2009, Fortuna and Ali Bastian's Viennese Waltz received a perfect score of 40.

On Saturday, November 28, 2009, Brian and Ali Bastian]'s performance in the Group Viennese Waltz earned them another perfect joint score from the judges.

On Wednesday, June 9, 2010, it was announced that Brian has decided not to return to Strictly Come Dancing for the 8th season due to format changes.

=== Dancing on Wheels ===
On May 28, 2009, the BBC issued a press release about their upcoming show Dancing on Wheels which uses the same title as a documentary from April 2007. This project aims to promote Wheelchair DanceSport with Brian Fortuna as the lead choreographer. Competitors will be put through intense training, as seen on Strictly Come Dancing and Dancing with the Stars, and will compete for a chance to represent the United Kingdom at the Wheelchair Dance Sport European Championships in Israel in the Fall of 2009. The programme began transmission on BBC3 on Thursday 11 February 2010.

Also joining the show will be Fortuna's celebrity partner from Strictly Come Dancing Series 6, M People's Heather Small, as well as Olympic swimmer Mark Foster, actress Michelle Gayle, actor Kevin Sacre, rugby player Martin Offiah, and presenter Caroline Flack. Dancing on Wheels is produced by Fever Media.

The BBC OneLife documentary, Dancing on Wheels (broadcast in England on BBC1 at 10.35pm on 17 April 2007), followed some of the teams at the Championships, including the Inverclyders and Concorde Wheelchair Dancers, exploring some of the reasons that people enjoy wheelchair dance in the UK.

== Stage ==
=== Aladdin ===
Fortuna appeared in Royal & Derngate's production of Aladdin this holiday season. The show will run from 9 December 2011 - 8 January 2012.

=== Over the Rainbow ===
Fortuna is currently starring in Theatre Production Ltd's Over the Rainbow as Danny Cassidy. The show began touring the UK on 3 September 2011.

=== Burn the Floor ===
Fortuna and Ali Bastian headlined Burn the Floor's run at the Shaftesbury Theatre in London's West End. The show ran from July 21 to September 4, 2010.

== Achievements ==
In 2004 and 2005, Brian won the North American Top Teacher competition. and in the same years, he was the Imperial Dance Sport Champion. Fortuna is a certified judge by the United States Terpsichore Association.

== Filmography ==
Fortuna appeared as a featured dancer in the film The Aviator. He was also the choreographer and dancer in the television drama South Beach starring Vanessa L. Williams.

== See also ==
- Wheelchair DanceSport
