= Carolyne Underwood =

British television personality (born 1982)

- Born: 3 March 1982 (age 44); England
- Known for: Dancing on Wheels, The Undateables
- Parents: Richard (father); Ann (mother)

Carolyne Underwood (born 1982) is a British television personality. She became paralysed in January 2007 when she had spinal cord lesion after a blood vessel burst in her back while she slept.

== Background ==
A former bar manager, Underwood now uses a wheelchair although she is determined to walk again. Initially, she had thought she would be well again within a few months, but had further complications to her condition and been told it is unlikely she will ever recover. In 2008, she received a donation of £24,000 from a mystery benefactor to enable her to fly to the United States to receive stem cell therapy. Her health condition prevented her from taking up the opportunity at that time. She lives in Stalybridge, Greater Manchester.

== Reality TV contestant ==
Underwood was one of the first disabled Reality TV show contestants to appear in two different Reality TV shows about disability. Sophie Morgan, who appeared in Beyond Boundaries and Britain's Missing Top Model, is the other disabled woman who has also appeared in two reality shows in the UK. Underwood participated in BBC Three's Dancing on Wheels in 2010, competing in a ballroom dancing competition with the English rugby league player Martin Offiah as her dancing partner, and in the first series of The Undateables, which was shown on Channel 4 in 2012. Underwood also appeared briefly at the end of the second series of The Undateables in an episode shown on Channel 4 on 5 February 2013 entitled 'Series One Revisited', and in Episode 5 of Series 4 in February 2015 in an episode entitled "Two weddings and a baby".

== Personal life ==
In 2014, Underwood gave birth to a son called Declan
