= Ian Mills =

- Born: Ian Mills; May 4, 1969 (age 56); London, U.K.
- Occupations: Director, Producer, Choreographer

Ian Mills (born 4 May 1969) is a producer, director and choreographer.

He has produced, choreographed and directed a number of West End shows and television programmes, including David Bedella Live In Concert and Britain's Missing Top Model.

He has worked with Broadway stars, TV celebrities and fashion icons, including David Bedella, Christopher Biggins and John Paul Gaultier.

== Britain's Missing Top Model ==
In July, 2008 Mills appeared in the TV show Britain's Missing Top Model alongside winner, Kelly Knox and leading photographer, Rankin.

On the show, he was catwalk choreographer for the girls, where he had just 48 hours to get the girls ready to perform in front of an audience that included a panel of judges who scrutinised their every step.

He was also responsible for giving the girls advice how to tackle making it in the fashion industry.

His work was subsequently described by the female fashion website FemaleFirst as a masterclass.

== Filmography ==
Mills has also choreographed television shows, such as Naked, Cabbies and Estate Agents. Also appeared on the Graham Norton show.
