= Richard Hopkins (TV producer) =

British television producer

- Born: Richard England Hopkins; 15 December 1964; Newport Pagnell, Buckinghamshire, England
- Died: 7 January 2012 (aged 47); London, England
- Education: Bedford School, University College London
- Occupations: Television producer/production company founder, director, TV Network Department Director
- Known for: Creating TV series Big Brother, Strictly Come Dancing

Richard England Hopkins (15 December 1964 – 7 January 2012) was a British television producer, best known for producing reality television series, such as Big Brother and Strictly Come Dancing.

== Biography ==
Born on 15 December 1964 in Newport Pagnell, Buckinghamshire, Richard Hopkins was educated at Bedford School and at University College London, where he read English literature. He worked in publishing and for various radio stations in Britain and France before he began working for the independent production company Planet 24, and became associate producer of Channel 4's The Big Breakfast, presented by Chris Evans and Gaby Roslin.

In 1996, Hopkins became the producer and director of BBC One's Hotel Babylon and, in 1997, he became the series producer of Baby Baby. In 2000, he became the producer of Channel 4's satirical The 11 O'Clock Show, producer of the British version of Big Brother, and, as executive producer, revamped Channel 4's The Big Breakfast. He produced Fear Factor between 2001 and 2003, and Fame Academy between 2002 and 2003.

Between 2003 and 2006, Hopkins ran the BBC's format entertainment department, and became executive producer of Mastermind, Weakest Link, A Question of Sport and Strictly Come Dancing. He left the BBC in 2006 in order to found Fever Media, producing The People's Quiz in 2007, and Move Like Michael Jackson in 2009.

Richard Hopkins died of cancer in London on 7 January 2012 at the age of 47.
