= Sensational =

Sensational may refer to:

- Sensational (Yung Gravy album), 2019
- Sensational (Michelle Gayle album), 1997
- Sensational (Erika de Casier album), 2021
- Sensational (horse) (1974–2000), US racehorse
- Sensational (musician) (1974–2026), Guyanese-American hip hop artist
- "Sensational" (song), a 2023 song by Chris Brown
- "Sensational", a song by English singer Robbie Williams, from his 2016 album The Heavy Entertainment Show

== See also ==
- Sensationalism
