= Do You Know (Michelle Gayle song) =

1997 single by Michelle Gayle

Single by Michelle Gayle

from the album Sensational
- Released: 27 January 1997
- Genre: Pop; R&B
- Length: 3:39
- Label: RCA; BMG; 1st Avenue
- Songwriters: Michelle Gayle; Shep Soloman
- Producer: Johnny Douglas

Michelle Gayle singles chronology
"Happy Just to Be with You" (1995)	"Do You Know" (1997)	"Sensational" (1997)

Music video
- "Do You Know" on YouTube

"Do You Know" is a song by British singer-songwriter Michelle Gayle, released in January 1997 by RCA, BMG and 1st Avenue Records as the first single from the singer's second album, Sensational (1997). The song was co-written by Gayle and received positive reviews from music critics. It peaked at number six on the UK Singles Chart and number two on the UK R&B Singles Chart, making it her second-highest-charting single. The accompanying music video for "Do You Know" was directed by Randee St. Nicholas and filmed in Los Angeles.

== Critical reception ==
Music Week gave the song four out of five, adding, "Strong R&B and house remixes will boost the profile of a pop song which, though not as uplifting as previous hits, is sung stunningly well." Music Week editor Alan Jones wrote, "Michelle Gayle is easily the most accomplished singer to emerge from television drama in recent years – no apologies to Robson & Jerome, or any of their ilk – and her career as a recording artist should be furthered by her latest single, 'Do You Know'. A jangly, semi-acoustic mid-tempo pop song, it allows Gayle plenty of room to demonstrate her fine vocal style. Busier and more rhythmically accentuated house mixes deliver this one to the dance floor too, making its success all the more likely." David Sinclair from The Times complimented it as a "gently appealing, acoustic pop song more in the Joan Armatrading vein than the sugary sound of Gayle's previous hits."

== Track listings ==
The "In the Mix" version of "Do You Know" contains six excerpts from various mixes of Gayle's songs: the Classic Expo and Tin Tin Out mixes of "Freedom", the West End mix of "Sweetness", the K-Klass mix of "Do You Know", the Bottom Dollar's Cream dub of "Happy Just to Be with You", and the Evolution mix of "Looking Up". The Japanese version does not include the Classic Expo mix of "Freedom".

- UK CD1
1. "Do You Know" (radio edit)
2. "Do You Know" (In the Mix)
3. "I'll Find You" (Body Bump 12-inch mix)
- UK CD2 (The Mixes)
1. "Do You Know" (radio edit)
2. "Do You Know" (Ignorants 'Spoonin' mix)
3. "Do You Know" (Linslee remix)
4. "Do You Know" (Best Kept Secret remix)
5. "Do You Know" (Tony De Vit mix)
6. "Do You Know" (K-Klass vocal mix)
7. "Do You Know" (Full Intention vocal mix)
- UK 12-inch single

A1. "Do You Know" (K-Klass vocal mix)
A2. "Do You Know" (K-Klass Pharmacy dub)
B1. "Do You Know" (Full Intention vocal mix)
B2. "Do You Know" (Linslee remix)
B3. "Do You Know" (Ignorants 'Spoonin' mix)

- UK cassette single and Japanese CD single
1. "Do You Know" (radio edit)
2. "Do You Know" (In the Mix)
- European CD single
1. "Do You Know" (K-Klass Klub edit)
2. "Do You Know" (radio edit)
- German maxi-CD single
1. "Do You Know" (radio edit)
2. "Do You Know" (Ignorant 'Spoonin' remix)
3. "Do You Know" (Linslee remix)
4. "Do You Know" (Tony De Vit mix)
5. "Do You Know" (K-Klass vocal mix)
6. "Do You Know" (Full Intention vocal mix)
- Australian CD single
1. "Do You Know" (radio edit)
2. "Do You Know" (In the Mix)
3. "Do You Know" (Tony De Vit mix)
4. "Do You Know" (K-Klass vocal mix)
5. "Do You Know" (Full Intention vocal mix)

== Charts ==
=== Weekly charts ===
Chart (1997)	Peak position
Estonia (Eesti Top 20)	5
Europe (Eurochart Hot 100)	44
France Airplay (SNEP)	92
Israel (Israeli Singles Chart)	30
Scottish Singles Sales (Official Charts)	7
UK Singles (Official Charts)	6
UK Hip Hop/R&B (Official Charts)	2
UK Pop Tip Club Chart (Music Week)	1

=== Year-end charts ===
Chart (1997)	Position
UK Club Chart (Music Week)	20

== Release history ==
Region	Date	Format(s)	Label(s)	Ref.
United Kingdom	27 January 1997	12-inch vinyl; CD; cassette	RCA; 1st Avenue	
Japan	21 May 1997	CD	RCA	

== Samples ==
In 2004, Dutch DJs Zentveld & Oomen, under the alias Angel City, created a track called "Do You Know (I Go Crazy)", which samples the lyrics of "Do You Know" and places them over the instrumental composition "Children" by Italian record producer Robert Miles. Released as a single in late 2004, "Do You Know (I Go Crazy)" became Angel City's highest- and longest-charting single in the UK, where it reached number eight on the UK Singles Chart, spending 15 weeks in the top 100. In Hungary, it reached number eight on the country's Dance Top 40 in January 2005. The song also charted in Ireland, the Netherlands, and the Flanders region of Belgium.
