= Para dance =

Para dance may refer to:

- Para Para, a synchronized dance
- Wheelchair DanceSport, a disabled dance sport
