= Natricia Bernard =

British choreographer

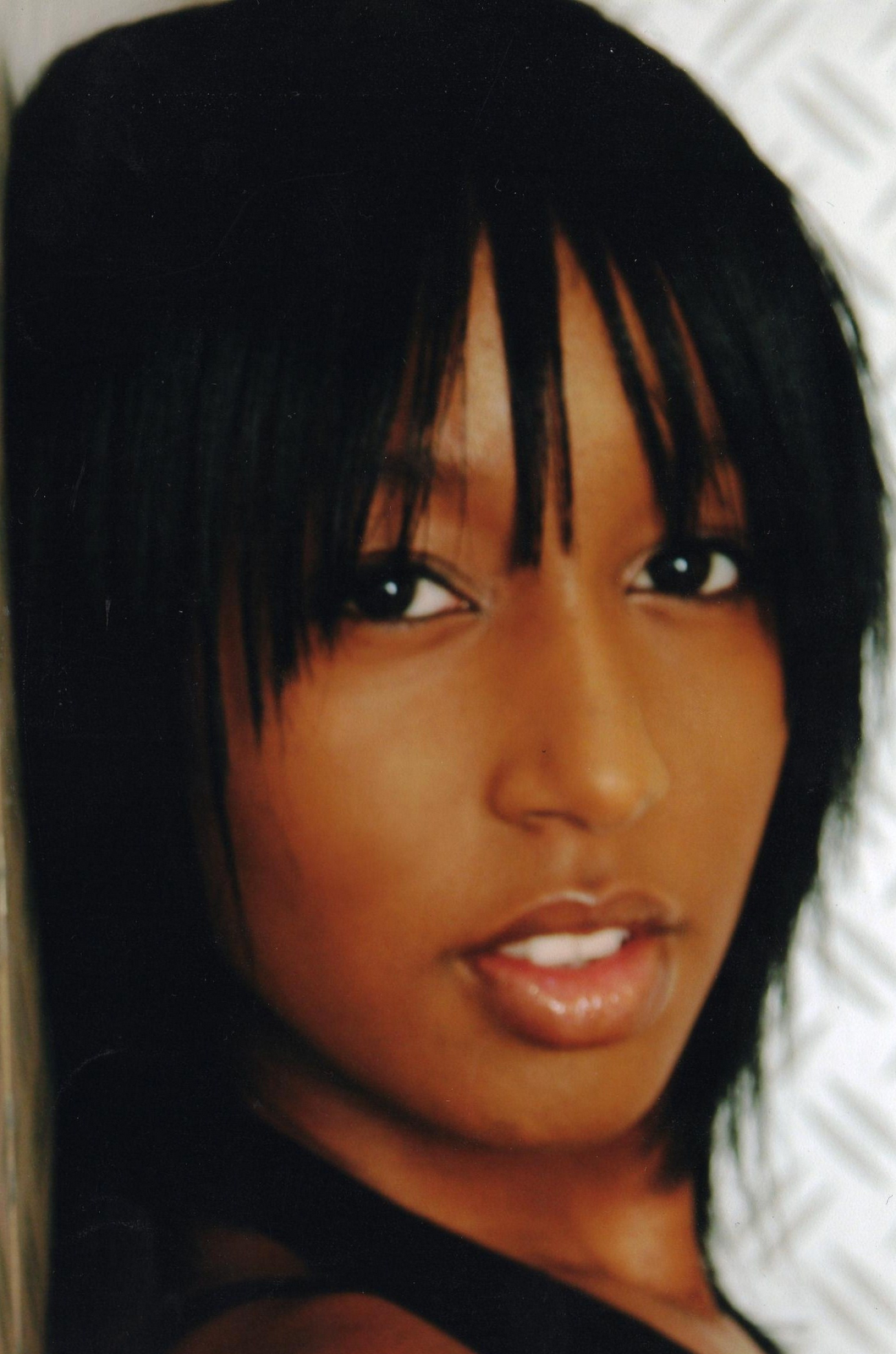
- Born: Natricia Tara Bernard
- Occupations: Creative director and choreographer
- Website: natriciabernard.com

Natricia Tara Bernard is a choreographer and creative director based in the UK who has worked with many leading artists for over 20 years. After appearing in a commercial at the age of 5, she trained at the Super Arts Stage school for 12 years, completing her training at the London Studio Centre. She has since worked with many big names in the entertainment industry, appearing on television, award shows, modelling, and choreographing for various work including music videos, commercials, television and events.

In 2009, Bernard was awarded companionship by the Liverpool Institute for Performing Arts for her contribution to the world of entertainment, a distinction similar to an honorary degree.

In 2010 she choreographed Katy Perry's "Firework" music video, which won an MTV award for Video of the Year.

Natricia Bernard is represented by Mark Summers in the UK, and Go 2 Talent in Los Angeles.

== List of work ==
A selection of notable productions for which Bernard served as a choreographer and/ or creative director.

=== Promos ===
Year	Client	Production	Director
2012	Gossip	Move in the Right Direction	Price James
2010	Katy Perry	Firework	Dave Meyers
2010	Paolo Nutini	Pencil Full of Lead	Corin Hardy
2009	Justin Timberlake/ 50 Cent/ Timbaland	Ayo Technology	Joseph Khan
2009	Florence and the Machine	Drumming Song	Dawn Shadforth
2009	Marina and the Diamonds	Mowgli's Road	Chris Sweeney
2008	Duffy	Rain on Your Parade	Sophie Muller
2008	Sugababes	No Can Do	Marco Puig
2008	KT Tunstall	Hold On	Peru
2008	Fedde le Grand vs Ida Corr	Let Me Think About It	Marus Adams
2007	Mika	Love Today	Sophie Muller
2007	Arctic Monkeys	Brainstorm	Huse
2007	Scissor Sisters	Kiss You Off	Robert Hales

=== Commercials ===
Year	Client	Title	Director
2013	Dsquared2	Behind The Mirror	Mert & Marcus
2012	KFC	I-Twist	Ray Kay
2012	Kia	Soulberg 1789	Carl Rinsch
2012	Smirnoff	Nocturnal Awakening	Nima Nourizadeh
2011	Clean & Clear	Morning Burst Body Wash	Alek Keshishian
2011	Heineken	Date	Fredrick Bond
2010	KFC	I-Twist	Andy Lambert
2010	DJ Hero	Commercial	Jess Scott-Hunter
2010	Radox	Daily Element Pure Clear	Danny & Ezra
2008	Berocca	Treadmill	Hadi
2008	Body & Soul	Scarlet	Tudor Payne

=== Tours & PA's ===
Client	Production
Florence and the Machine	Grammy's 2011
Kanye West	Wireless Festival 2009
Duffy	Rockferry World Tour 2009
Florence and the Machine	Cosmic Love Tour
Kanye West	London European Concerts 2009
Natalie Imbruglia	Stage Show 2009

=== Other credits ===
Natricia Bernard was the Movement director for Dizzee Rascal and Florence and the Machine's BRIT Awards performance in 2010, several award show performances by Duffy, and was the associate choreographer on the BBC show Move Like Michael Jackson. In 2009 she was the choreographer for the London castings for Michael Jackson's 2009 This Is It concerts.

In October 2012, Natricia Bernard was at the world premiere of Show Me with the cast of YMA at Friedrichstadt-Palast Berlin Germany. She is one of the choreographers of the show, for which she has choreographed four songs with 60 dancers.

In November 2012, Bernard secretly trained Edinburgh couple Gemma and Darren Tunesi to have them ready to take the floor for the new STV show First Dance and won the £10,000 prize.
