= I'm Spazticus =

British television series

I'm Spazticus is a British hidden camera prank show by Channel 4, produced by Jamie O'Leary. From the Channel 4 website, I'm Spazticus is where "A cast of disabled talent prank members of the public in a cheeky and irreverent way".

== Episodes ==
Series 1 was first broadcast in August 2012 in the run up to the 2012 Paralympic Games, and starred Tim Baggaley, Tanyalee Davis, Tim Gebbels, Maxwell Laird, Andrew Martin and Simon Stevens. Series 2 was broadcast in August–September 2013, and the cast from Series 1 were joined by Martin Dougan, Kelly Knox and Deepa Shastri.
