= Find Me the Face =

2008 British television series

- Genre: Documentary
- Directed by: Danny Fildes; Nik Warner
- Country of origin: United Kingdom
- Original language: English
- No. of series: 1
- No. of episodes: 6

Original release
- Network: BBC Three
- Release: 12 February – 18 March 2008

Find Me the Face is a documentary which was made by Fever Media and first broadcast on BBC Three between 12 February and 18 March 2008. The show was brought in to go with BBC Three's new revamp. The show bases around two UK model scouts, Becky Southwick and Jody Furlong to find new talent.

Jody Furlong is one of the UK's leading casting directors and founder of The Eye www.theeyecasting.com – a casting and model agency based in London.

== Episodes ==
- "Lingerie Girls"
- "Yummy Mummy"
- "Urban Boy"
- "Plus Size Girl"
- "Catwalk Girl"
- "Beauty Model"

The director of episodes 1, 3 and 5 is Nik Warner. Danny Fildes directs the other episodes.
