= Piotr Iwanicki =

Polish wheelchair dancer

Piotr Iwanicki (born May 15, 1984) is a multiple wheelchair World Latin Champion. Winner of wheelchair dancing World Cup and European Championships. In 2006 Iwanicki has been one of the most accomplished wheelchair dancers in the world. He has won four world championships, two European Championships and seven Polish championships—all between 1999 and 2006. He has also garnered a few World Cup crowns.

Since 2002 he is dancing with able-bodied Dorota Janowska. In June 2006 they were selected as athletes of the month by the International Paralympic Committee. His previous partner was Monika Zawadzka. He represents Poland and dance club Swing-Duet.

== Career highlights ==
- 2002, 2004-2006 Gold Medal at the IPC Wheelchair Dance World Cup
- 2005 Gold Medal at the IPC Wheelchair Dance Sport Open European Cup
- 2002 and 2004 Gold Medal at the IPC Wheelchair Dance World Latin Championships
- 2003 Gold Medal at the Wheelchair Dance European Championships
- 2002-2006 Gold Medal at the Wheelchair Dance International Polish Championships
