= Kate Thornton =

English TV presenter (born 1973)

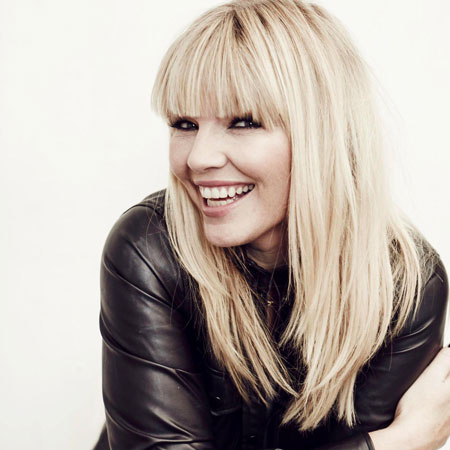
- Born: Kate Louise Thornton; 7 February 1973 (age 53); Cheltenham, Gloucestershire, England
- Occupations: Television presenter, journalist
- Years active: 1995–present
- Television: Don't Try This at Home! (1998–2001); The X Factor (2004–2006); Loose Women (2009–2011); This Morning (2009–2012); 71 Degrees North (2010)
- Partner: Darren Emerson (2004–2011)
- Children: 1

Kate Louise Thornton (born 7 February 1973) is an English journalist and broadcaster, best known as the first presenter of The X Factor (2004–2006) and for presenting daytime shows including Loose Women (2009–2011) and This Morning (2009–2012). In 2010, she co-presented the first series of 71 Degrees North alongside Gethin Jones.

== Career ==
=== Journalism ===
In 1995, at 21 she became the youngest editor of pop magazine Smash Hits. She left a year later, having been unable to prevent a further slide in sales of the magazine. In 1997, she became a Features Editor at the Sunday Times, a post she held until 2001, and also a contributing Editor for magazine Marie Claire, in which position she continued until 2003.

=== Television ===
Whilst undertaking these new editorial roles, Thornton began a second career in television. In February 1997, Thornton was given her first TV presenting job, on the ITV current affairs programme Straight Up. She was tasked with putting together a photo tribute with music for Princess Diana on the day of her death. In an interview in March 2011, Thornton said: "...because it was a Sunday, the music library was shut and the only thing I had in my car, the only piece of music that was appropriate was "Candle in the Wind" from Elton John's greatest hits." Colleagues attributed the subsequent airplay and then the re-recording of the song to this event. Thornton is quoted as having been doubtful initially, but later having come to accept the possibility: "I never dared to assume for one minute that I was the link. But Nick Knowles (co-presenter on the show) has convinced me that whatever came as a result of it was all down to me."

Thornton was the first presenter of the UK series of The X Factor. She presented three series of the show from 2004 until 2006 before being replaced by Dermot O'Leary. Thornton later anchored ITV's daytime series Loose Women, in rotation with Andrea McLean. She presented 233 episodes of the show from 2009. She, and fellow Loose Woman Zoë Tyler, were replaced in 2011 by Carol Vorderman and Sally Lindsay.

Thornton was a regular stand-in presenter on This Morning and in 2010, she co-presented the first series of 71 Degrees North alongside Gethin Jones. Neither returned for the second series. In 2010, she narrated The Nation's Favourite Abba Song. Thornton also presented A Night with Will Young in 2011. She guest presented six episodes of Lorraine in 2012.

Thornton also presented Gravity Games for BBC Two, Women: The Naked Truth Honest for Channel 4 and Breasts Uncupped for Sky1.

She currently hosts The Royal Beat - a topical royal chat show - on True Royalty TV, which is available via Amazon Prime and Apple TV.

=== Radio ===
Thornton has presented a number of programmes for BBC Radio 2 since 2002. Along with presenting, Thornton was also the writer of the radio documentary From Band to Brand in 2004, and the creator of the radio series Line of Enquiry, inviting an audience to put questions to a number of celebrities, which began in 2007.

From 10 March until 28 April 2013, Thornton presented The Boots Feel Good Forum, a radio show dedicated to health and fitness, which aired on Real Radio and Smooth Radio.

From 2014 to 2016, Thornton presented Paper Cuts, a radio series for BBC Radio 2. The show ran for four series and, in the show, Thornton would chat to celebrities about the headlines they had been involved in. The first guest was Craig Revel Horwood.

She joined Greatest Hits Radio on 26 February 2022, where she broadcasts every Sunday. She has taken over the weekday afternoon show from 11 November 2024. From September 2026, she is moving back to Saturday Afternoons when Zoe Ball joins weekday afternoon slot while still doing Sunday Evenings.

=== Other work ===
Thornton launched cashback site TBSeen in January 2016, along with TV presenters Myleene Klass, Amanda Byram and Denise Van Outen, celebrity chef Lisa Faulkner, actresses Tamzin Outhwaite, Julie Graham and singers Heidi Range and the band All Saints, Nicole Appleton, Natalie Appleton, Mel Blatt and Shaznay Lewis. TBSeen entered administration in September 2018.

Thornton hosted the live Strictly Come Dancing tour in 2008, 2009, 2010, 2012 and 2013.

In 2019 Thornton launched "White Wine Question Time", a podcast that sees her sit down with a celebrity guest each week to ask them three thought provoking questions over three glasses of wine. The podcast first aired in January 2019 with guests Heidi Range, Lisa Faulkner and Angela Griffin. There are currently over 300 episodes in the back catalogue featuring the likes of HRH Princess Eugenie, actress Hannah Waddingham, award winning singer Raye and a host of household names.

During the UK's COVID-19 lockdown in 2020, she also created and hosted "Up Close And Socially Distant", a video series for Yahoo!, where she talked over video call to famous celebrities, front line workers and those leading initiatives to help serve the community during lockdown. The show ran for nine weeks and won a Silver Lovie award.

== Personal life ==
Thornton began dating DJ Darren Emerson in 2004. The couple became engaged in 2007. She gave birth in 2008. Her relationship with Emerson ended in 2011.

In January 2012, Thornton said that after leaving Loose Women she had enrolled at college to study counselling because her television career had "hit the kerb".

== Filmography ==
Television

Year	Title	Role
1998–1999	Top of the Pops	Presenter
1998–1999	Dishes	Presenter
1998–1999	The Power List	Presenter
1998–2000	The Kate and Jono Show	Co-presenter
1998–2000	Don't Try This at Home	Presenter
1998–2000	This Morning	Reporter
2000	The TV BAFTAs	Presenter
2001	The Brits are Coming	Presenter
2001	The Brits: Backstage	Presenter
2001	BAFTA Children's Awards	Presenter
2001–2002	The Ideal Home Show	Presenter
2001–2003	Pop Idol: Extra	Presenter
2001–2003	Holiday – You Call the Shots	Presenter
2002	Lad's Army	Presenter
2003	VH-1's Behind the Movies: Top Gun	Narrator
2004	American Idol	Guest
2004	Westlife - She's The One	Host
2004–2006	The X Factor	Presenter
2005	Celebrity Wrestling	Co-presenter
2005	Happy Birthday Elton John	Presenter
2005	Greatest Britons	Presenter
2007	Britain's Classroom Heroes	Co-presenter
2007	Royal Variety Performance	Co-presenter
2008	Countdown to Midnight: Take That Live	Presenter
2008	Don't Miss a Trick	Presenter
2008	Hello Goodbye	Presenter
2008	Elton's New Year's Eve Party	Presenter
2009–2011	Loose Women	Presenter
2009–2012,2018	This Morning	Relief presenter
2010	71 Degrees North	Co-presenter
2010	The Nation's Favourite Abba Song	Narrator
2011	A Night with Will Young	Presenter
2011, 2012	This Morning's Hub	Relief presenter
2012	Lorraine	Guest presenter
2018	The One Show	Presenter of special segment on Smash Hits
2019	Richard Osman's House of Games	Panellist
2021	Celebrity Mastermind	Contestant
2023	The Hit List	Contestant
2024	The Royal Beat	Presenter

Radio

Year	Title	Role	Network	Notes
2010–2020	Let's Talk	Presenter	BBC Newcastle	Regular presenter
2011	Going Out with Alan Carr	Stand-in presenter	BBC Radio 2	
2013	The Boots Feel Good Forum	Presenter	Real Radio & Smooth Radio	1 series
2014–2016, 2019	Paper Cuts	Presenter	BBC Radio 2	4 series (2014–2016) Christmas Special (2019)
2015	Magic's Music of My Life	Presenter	Magic	1 series
2017	Saturday Breakfast	Stand-in presenter	BBC Radio 2	
2017	Kate Thornton's 90s	Presenter	BBC Radio 2	One-off special
2017–2019	The Zoe Ball Show	Stand-in presenter	BBC Radio 2	
2022–2024	Saturday Nights	Presenter	Greatest Hits Radio	
2023-present	Weekend Anthems	Presenter	Greatest Hits Radio	
2023–2024	The Smash Hits Years	Presenter	Greatest Hits Radio	
2024, 2026-present	Saturday Afternoons	Presenter	Greatest Hits Radio	
2024–present	The UK Pop 40	Presenter	Greatest Hits Radio	
2024-2026	National Afternoon Show	Presenter	Greatest Hits Radio	
