= Debbie van der Putten =

Dutch model (born 1985)

Debbie Heldens - van der Putten
- Born: Debbie van der Putten; 1985 (age 40–41); Helmond, Netherlands
- Occupations: Model/Leisure and Tourism
- Years active: 2007–present
- Known for: Britain's Missing Top Model Contestant
- Modelling information
- Height: 1.68 m (5 ft 6 in)
- Hair colour: Brown
- Eye colour: Blue
- Agency: Julia Barton Milan

Debbie van der Putten (born 1985) is a Dutch model who also works in the tourism industry. She is particularly known for her physical disability, after she lost her right arm above the elbow as a result of a bus crash in the south of France in 2005; and as a contestant on reality TV programmes such as the Dutch show Miss Ability (2007) and the BBC3 show Britain's Missing Top Model (2008).

== Career ==
Between 1998 and 2002, van der Putten studied Tourism and Catering at De Rooi Pannen, a vocational training college.

Before appearing on Britain's Missing Top Model, van der Putten was the first amputee to be featured in a European edition of Playboy in 2007, when she modelled nude for the Dutch edition in an issue which broke sales records.

In 2008, van der Putten worked in tourism as a career. Since Britain's Missing Top Model she was part of Angel Sinclair's diversity campaign in London through 'Models of Diversity'. In January 2012, she was signed by the Ben Barry agency in Canada, an agency that has now closed. Barry's agency specialised in diverse models. Sinclair founded the 'Models for Diversity' campaign to promote models that challenge convention. Models for Diversity featured van der Putten on its first billboard campaign, held during the 2012 Summer Paralympics in London.

In 2014, Debbie featured in a campaign for the Dutch department store chain De Bijenkorf, although The Huffington Post noted that she was seen only on the app, while the website showed the same dress worn by a different model.

In 2023, she made a comeback posing for Steve Madden (company) in the #tobitefor campaign featuring Dutch television presenter/stylist Fred van Leer

In various international sources, she has been cited alongside Aimee Mullins as an example of a disabled fashion model.
