= Sophie Morgan =

English television presenter (born 1985)

- Born: 24 February 1985 (age 41); Crowborough, East Sussex, England
- Occupation: Television presenter
- Website: sophiemorgan.com

Sophie Morgan (born 1985) is a British television presenter and disability advocate who is paraplegic. As a wheelchair user, she is often considered a social media influencer in the disability advocacy space, using online platforms to discuss disability awareness. She is also a travel writer. She became a presenter after appearing on reality television. In 2021, she was a lead presenter for Channel 4's TV coverage of the Summer Paralympics in Tokyo. She has been voted one of the most influential disabled people in the UK as part of the Shaw Trust's Disability Power 100. Morgan has been working on television for over twenty years.

== Early life ==
Morgan was born near Crowborough, East Sussex, in 1985. Her father is a wine broker and her mother held various positions as a nurse, gundog trainer and air stewardess. Morgan was educated at Cumnor House School, Danehill, East Sussex and Gordonstoun School. "Having been chucked out of school in England, Sophie was sent to Gordonstoun School" in Moray, Scotland.

Morgan sustained a T6 spinal cord injury in a road traffic accident in 2003, at the age of 18. This left her with paralysis from the chest down, and she has since used a wheelchair.

Prior to the accident, Morgan had planned to study law at the University of Manchester. Having returned to live with her parents in Brighton, she instead opted to study art at the City College Brighton & Hove After completing her art foundation course, she started a Bachelor of Arts degree in fine arts at Goldsmiths, University of London (2007–2009). During her degree, a second career opportunity arose, as she was asked to participate in an expedition across Nicaragua (Beyond Boundaries, BBC 2004). She later obtained a diploma in arts therapy from the Institute for Arts in Therapy and Education.

As of 2024, Morgan resides in Los Angeles, after moving from London.

=== Stalker ===
In August 2018, Robert Keegan was convicted of harassing Morgan and given a 12-month prison sentence, suspended for 18 months, and an indefinite restraining order stopping him from contacting her. He subsequently breached the restraining order and in March 2019, on trial at Inner London Crown Court, was ordered to be detained in a secure psychiatric hospital for assessment awaiting sentencing.

== Career in television ==
In 2004, nine months after her accident, Morgan took part in the first series of BBC Two's Beyond Boundaries, which followed 11 disabled people on an expedition to traverse 220 miles across Nicaragua from its Atlantic coast to its Pacific coast. She contracted amoebic dysentery in the jungle, requiring 5 days' hospitalisation, and was unable to complete the expedition. A follow-up program, Beyond Boundaries: Where Are They Now?, was broadcast in 2009.

In 2008, Morgan appeared in BBC Three's Britain's Missing Top Model. For the series, 8 women with disabilities competed to impress a panel of judges and "prove that they have what it takes to become a model." The winner received a fashion shoot for Marie Claire magazine with photographer Rankin. Danny Cohen said that the series aimed to challenge boundaries in the beauty and fashion industries." Morgan was the runner-up to Kelly Knox. In 2011, Morgan was one of 12 women who were part of Stella McCartney's Adidas campaign for her 'MY2012' sportswear collection.

In 2013, Morgan presented Licence to Kill, a documentary for BBC Three about road accidents like hers caused by young drivers. The documentary won the Royal Television Society's award for Best Current Affairs film of 2013. Tom Sutcliffe, for The Independent, described it as "an often heartbreaking film, focusing on the misery that follows road-traffic accidents and the terrifying insouciance of young people about their own survival."

In 2015 Morgan travelled to Ghana, West Africa, to present The World's Worst Place To Be Disabled?, a documentary for BBC Three made as part of the channel's Defying the Label season. Nora Groce, an anthropologist working with people with disabilities in the developing world, described the documentary as "an accurate depiction of the life faced by millions of persons with disabilities".

In 2018 Morgan co-hosted a British Channel 4 TV series, Best Laid Plans, with architectural designer Charlie Luxton. They came to the aid of homeowners whose domestic renovation projects had hit problems, helping the couples resolve their differences and come to decisions on how to proceed with their projects. The show lasted for one season.

In 2021 she presented Living Wild: How to Change Your Life. in a road trip across the UK, meeting people united by a desire to build new lives around the things they love.

From 2021–24, Morgan was one of the rotating panellists on ITV's Loose Women.

=== Reportage ===
Morgan has appeared in Horizon for BBC Two, The One Show for BBC One and has reported for Channel 4 News as part of the No Go Britain series which examines accessibility and transport issues for disabled people.

In 2019, Morgan presented 'The Secrets of Amazon', an edition of the Channel 4 current affairs series Dispatches.

=== Sports broadcasting ===
Morgan had a small role as a presenter for Channel 4's sports coverage of the 2012 Summer Paralympics in London, and co-hosted, with JJ Chalmers, the channel's coverage of the 2016 Summer Paralympics in Rio de Janeiro Morgan has also co-hosted Channel 4's paralympic magazine show, The Superhuman Show, with Alex Brooker, and presented coverage of the 2016 IPC Swimming European Championships.

Morgan was chosen for another presenting role for the 2020 Summer Paralympics.

Morgan is doing the Paris 2024 Summer Paralympics coverage from NBC Sports headquarters from Connecticut.

== Disability advocacy ==
In recognition of her work with The Back Up Trust, a charity providing support for people with spinal cord injuries, Morgan was named Girl of The Year by Cosmopolitan in 2004. In 2013, she was named Ultimate Campaigner of the year in Cosmopolitan's Ultimate Women Awards. In 2015 Morgan became a patron of disability charity Scope. She is also Global Ambassador for Leonard Cheshire and on the special advisory board for Human Rights Watch.
