= Mark Summers (casting director) =

British casting director

Mark Summers is a British casting director who works in North America and Europe.

== Career ==
Mark Summers began his career as an actor, training at the Barbara Speake Stage School, before moving into casting for adverts, music videos, film and world tours in both Britain and America.

He won the British Advertising Craft Award for Best Casting Director in 2003, and has been nominated on six other occasions. Additionally, Summers has been the chairman of the awards for Best Performance.

He has over 12,000 casting credits to his name. Performers he has cast have been in works such as East is East, The Boat That Rocked and Queer Eye, and in adverts for, among others, Aussie, Boots, Häagen-Dazs, Macy's and Virgin.

Summers has also cast music videos and tours for artists including 50 Cent, Beyoncé, Justin Timberlake, Robert Plant and Metallica.

Summers runs a class teaching the 'do's and dont's' of casting.

=== Television ===
Mark Summers and his team (including Associate Director Louise Mason) have also been involved with numerous television shows, most notably joining Jermaine Jackson in December 2009 as a judge on the 6-part BBC show Move Like Michael Jackson. The show also went into production in Belgium and The Netherlands, aired on SBS 6, where Summers also served as a judge.

He is a regular media commentator on dance, media and casting, with a column in Campaign, and has hosted/appeared on many TV shows, including:

- Britain's Missing Top Model
- Move Like Michael Jackson, BBC (UK) and SBS6 (Benelux)
- Bump and Grind (Trouble TV)
- Make Me a Supermodel (UK TV series)
- The Boss is Coming to Dinner (C5)
- The Model Agent Ireland (The Model Scouts)
- Bust a Move (MTV Networks UK)

=== Other media ===
In 2009 Summers and his team were chosen to be the UK Casting Directors on Michael Jackson's This Is It concerts.

=== Awards ===
Mark Summers has received many nominations and awards for his work. Having won the British Advertising Craft Award for Best Casting Director in 2003, he set a new record by being nominated on six additional occasions.

In 2008 he was a Craft Finalist for the Casting category at the British Arrow Awards, an honor which he also won in 2003.

In 2010, Summers was honored by Sir Paul McCartney at the Liverpool Institute for Performing Arts (LIPA), made a ‘Friend of LIPA’, and was awarded a 'Companionship', one of the highest honors ever bestowed by the University. In 2011 Summers was also made mentor and patron of The Royal Academy of Dance. For the past number of years he has also been on the jury panel for Best Performance by an Actor/Actress at the British Television Advertising Awards (BTAA).

== Mark Summers (agency) ==
Mark Summers, located in Kensington, London, UK, consists of three separate divisions: casting, dance, and management. They have worked on over 10,000 productions across the world for film, TV, voice-overs, commercials, dance, print, world tours and fashion.

=== Mark Summers Dance & Choreography ===
In addition to retaining trained dancers, the dance division represents choreographers such as Wade Robson, Natricia Bernard, Litza Bixler, Travis Payne and Brian Friedman.

The dance division's choreographers and dancers have worked with artists including Madonna, Kanye West, P!nk, Lady Gaga and Jennifer Lopez.

=== Mark Summers Casting ===
Mark Summers is the Casting Director to David LaChappelle, Alek Keshishian, Tony Kaye, Sam Bayer and Paul Hunter.

=== Mark Summers Studios ===
Located next to the West Kensington Underground, Mark Summers Studios has one of the largest casting studios in London.

=== Mark Summers Management ===
The management division represents actors, dancers, and choreographers, as well as other performers.
