= Dancing on Wheels =

- Created by: Harry Lansdown
- Judges: James Jordan; Ola Jordan; Ade Adepitan
- Narrated by: Preeya Kalidas
- Country of origin: United Kingdom
- No. of series: 1
- No. of episodes: 6

Production
- Running time: 60 mins
- Production company: Fever Media

Original release
- Network: BBC Three
- Release: 11 February – 18 March 2010

Dancing on Wheels is a British Reality TV show made by production company Fever Media and first broadcast on BBC Three on 11 February 2010. The concept of the show is that an able-bodied celebrity dances with a wheelchair user. The couples dance each week, and each week one couple is eliminated in a dance-off. In the final, the two remaining couples both perform two dances, and one couple wins the show and is selected to represent the UK in the European Championships.

== Judges ==
The judges for the first series were:

Judge	Notes
James Jordan	Professional on Strictly Come Dancing
Ola Jordan	Professional on Strictly Come Dancing
Ade Adepitan	Presenter, wheelchair basketball player and actor

== Choreographers ==
The choreographers for the first series were:

Choreographer	Notes
Brian Fortuna	Professional on Strictly Come Dancing
Kristina Rihanoff	Professional on Strictly Come Dancing

== Contestants ==
The contestants for the first series were:

Celebrity	Known for	Disabled partner	Status
Caroline Flack	TV Presenter	James O'Shea	Winners
Mark Foster	Olympic swimmer	Diana Morgan-Hill	Runners-up
Michelle Gayle	Singer	Harry Maule	Eliminated
Heather Small	Singer	Paul Jacob	Eliminated
Martin Offiah	Rugby league player	Carolyne Underwood	Eliminated
Kevin Sacre	Hollyoaks actor	Simone Milani	Eliminated

== See also ==
- Wheelchair DanceSport
