= Demi Holborn =

Welsh singer

Demi Ann-Marie Holborn is a Welsh professional singer, one of the UK's youngest female solo artists to hit the Top 40 of the UK Singles Chart.

== Singing career ==
The youngest of four children, Holborn began her career in the music business at the age of eight and was offered two recording contracts. In 2002, her eldest brother secretly entered her in GMTV's Totstars competition. After weeks of waiting, the phone votes were counted and out of approximately 200,000 votes, Holborn received 164,365. From this, Holborn won a record contract with Universal Records and a scholarship to the Barbara Speake Stage School, beating 6,000 competitors for the top prize. She then released a record with covers of "I’d Like to Teach the World to Sing" / "My Boy" with the bonus track "Ben", which reached number 27 on the UK Singles Chart, number 5 in Wales and 61 in Germany. As a result of the charting she unseated Lena Zavaroni as the youngest female solo artist to make the UK Top 40.

In 2005, Holborn was believed to be an early contender for the Junior Eurovision Song Contest, but was ultimately disqualified from the competition as she had already charted a song and was therefore no longer considered an amateur.

Holborn has performed at many events in Wales such as Party in the Park 2002 and the Millennium Stadium meeting. Since the competition, she has performed to help raise funds for various charities in the UK.

Holborn released her latest single "If I Could" on various sites on 5 August 2012.

== Personal life ==
Holborn was a pupil at Pontnewynydd Primary School when she started her professional singing career, and became the youngest singer in Guinness World Records.
