= Rebecca Le'gon =

British publisher

- Born: 1980 (age 45–46); Colchester, Essex, England
- Occupations: Publisher; model

Rebecca Le'gon (born 1980) is director and publisher of Manchester-based magazine, Viva Lifestyle and Viva London, a free glossy publication and online website about lifestyle, fashion, beauty, fine dining, motoring, property, live music and events. Viva was launched in May 2010 in Manchester and Cheshire, and is targeted at 25- to 45-year-old young professionals. It specialises in events and PR, marketing, advertising campaigns and design work. Le'gon is a former model.

== Personal life ==
Le'gon was born with a hip that did not grow and a shortened left leg. She was fitted with a prosthetic limb at eighteen months. She is a fitness fanatic whose father, a ski instructor in the army, encouraged her to learn to ski.

== Early modelling career ==
In 2008, Le'gon was one of eight physically disabled women contestants in Britain's Missing Top Model a TV reality show on BBC3. She appeared in two episodes and was eliminated in the first round. In 2010, Le'gon signed to DK Model Management, a modelling agency in Sheffield, South Yorkshire.
