= Barbara Speake Stage School =

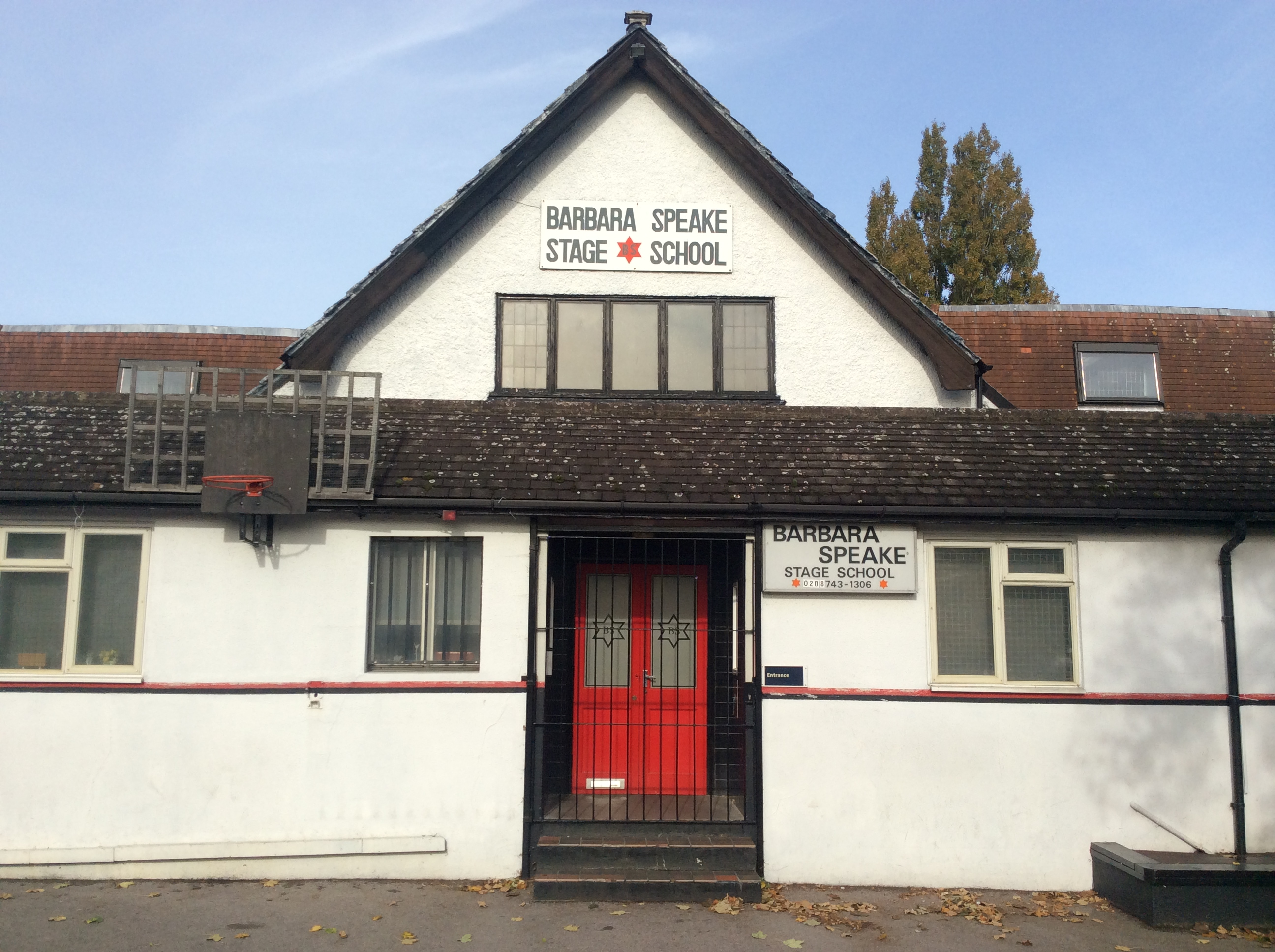

Location
- East Acton Lane; East Acton, London, W3 7EG; England; 51.51234°N 0.25517°W

Information
- Type: Independent school Day school Co-educational school
- Established: 10 February 1945
- Founder: Barbara Speake
- Closed: 15 July 2020
- Local authority: Ealing Council
- Department for Education URN: 101948 Tables
- Principal: Shereen Boucher
- Headteacher: David Speake
- Gender: Co-educational
- Age: 4 to 16
- Campus: Urban campus

The Barbara Speake Stage School was an independent performing arts school in London, England between 1945 and 2020. It was initially set up as a dancing school by the founding principal Barbara Speake, opening on 10 February 1945. Located in East Acton, the school was fee-paying but non-selective in its admissions. The school closed in 2020.

== History ==
In 1961, June Collins (mother of drummer/singer Phil Collins) joined forces with Barbara Speake to become the school's agent. Collins supplied the entertainment industry with children for every major production in the West End, TV and Theatre. Due to the success of both the agency and dancing school, in 1963 the decision was made to turn their successes in to a full-time educational establishment for the performing arts. Collins discovered Jack Wild playing football and decided that he was a child with potential, and persuaded his family to let him attend the full-time school. Wild went on to receive an Academy Award nomination for his portrayal of "The Artful Dodger" in Oliver! Collins died in November 2011.

Barbara Speake was appointed a Member of the Order of the British Empire (MBE) in the 2007 New Year Honours, for services to drama in London.

The School received an Inadequate Ofsted rating at its last inspection (30 April 2019). The decline from a Satisfactory rating began with an emergency inspection on 4 July 2014 which found that the welfare, health and safety of pupils was at risk following the installation of CCTV without appropriate changing facilities being provided. The inspection found that there were no changing facilities for female pupils.

== Alumni ==
- Aml Ameen (born 1985), actor
- Amma Asante, screenwriter, film director and former actress
- Rachel Brennock actress, singer and songwriter
- Naomi Campbell, model
- Keith Chegwin, child actor and TV presenter
- Julie Dawn Cole, actress
- Phil Collins, Genesis member and solo artist, music producer, actor (and June Collins' son)
- Brian Conley, comedian, actor, singer and TV presenter
- Alison Dowling, actress
- Michelle Gayle, actress and singer
- Kim Goody, actress and singer
- Denise Gyngell, singer, member of the 1980s pop group Tight Fit
- Grange Hill cast members Lindy Brill (Cathy), Paul McCarthy (Tommy), Mark Baxter (Duane), Mark Savage (Gripper), Gary Love (Jimmy), Ian Congdon-Lee (Ted), Darren Cudjoe (Clarke)
- Demi Holborn (born 1992), singer
- Keith Jayne, actor
- Kwame Kwei-Armah, actor and playwright
- Lindy Layton, lead vocalist of Beats International and 1989 number one single Dub Be Good to Me
- Angie Le Mar, comedian
- Sylvestra Le Touzel, actress
- Paul J. Medford, actor
- David Parfitt, film producer
- Jeff Stevenson, comedian
- Sara Sugarman, writer, director, and actress
- Mark Summers, casting director
- Jack Wild, child actor
- Kedar Williams-Stirling (born 1994), actor
