= Michelle Gayle (album) =

Studio album by Michelle Gayle
- Released: 10 October 1994
- Length: 64:00
- Labels: RCA; BMG
- Producer: Narada Michael Walden

Michelle Gayle chronology
Michelle Gayle (1994)	Sensational (1997)

Singles from Michelle Gayle
- 1. "Looking Up" Released: 26 July 1993; 2. "Sweetness" Released: 12 September 1994; 3. "I'll Find You" Released: 5 December 1994; 4. "Freedom" Released: 15 May 1995; 5. "Happy Just to Be with You" Released: 14 August 1995

Michelle Gayle is the debut album by British R&B-soul singer Michelle Gayle, released in 1994 by RCA Records of BMG UK. The album was produced and co-written in parts by Narada Michael Walden who had previously worked with artists such as Whitney Houston. According to the sleeve notes of the single "Sweetness", the album was originally scheduled to be titled Walk with Pride.

The album includes Gayle's biggest hit single "Sweetness", which reached No. 4 on the UK Singles Chart, along with four other UK top-40 singles; "Looking Up" (No. 11), "I'll Find You" (No. 26), "Freedom" (No. 16) and "Happy Just to Be with You" (No. 11). "Happy Just to Be with You" was remixed for single release; this version features on Gayle's second album, Sensational.

== Critical reception ==
Professional ratings
Review scores
Source	Rating
AllMusic	4/5 stars
NME	7/10

Emma Forrest from NME wrote, "She has an impressive range, from sharp and sassy on the upbeat numbers, to feathery and soothing on the soulful tracks. Over the 15 songs, she hits every note perfectly, unlike some other crossover stars we won't mention." AllMusic rated the album four out of five stars.

== Track listing ==
Michelle Gayle track listing
No.	Title	Writer(s)	Producer(s)	Length
1.	"Get Off My Back"	Michelle Gayle; Ronnie Wilson; Dennis Charles	Wilson; Charles	4:09
2.	"Happy Just to Be with You"	Gayle; Narada Michael Walden; Preston Glass	Walden; Claytoven Richardson; Mike Mani	4:35
3.	"Walk with Pride"	Gayle; Wilson; Charles	Wilson; Charles	4:01
4.	"Looking Up"	Dave James; J. Rawe	James	4:33
5.	"Girlfriend"	Gayle; James	James	4:10
6.	"Freedom"	Walden; Sally Jo Dakota	Walden; Richardson; Mani	4:08
7.	"Personality"	Gayle; T. Morris	James; Wilson; Charles	3:49
8.	"I'll Find You"	Steve Jervier; Jonathan Wales; Paul Jervier	S. Jervier; Wales; P. Jervier	5:32
9.	"Your Love"	Gayle; James	James	5:10
10.	"Sweetness"	Walden; Glass	Walden; Glass	3:36
11.	"One Day"	S. Jervier; Wales; P. Jervier	S. Jervier; Wales; P. Jervier	3:45
12.	"Say What's on Your Mind"	Gayle; Wilson; Charles	Wilson; Charles	3:44
13.	"Rise Up" (Blacksmith Remix)	Simon Climie	Climie; Blacksmith^{[a]}	3:39
14.	"Baby Don't Go"	Gayle; Walden; Dakota	Walden; Richardson; Mani	5:03
15.	"All Night Long"	Walden; Mani; Monty Steward	Walden; Mani; Steward	4:42
Total length:				64:00

Notes

- ^{^[a]} signifies a remix producer

== Charts ==
Weekly chart performance for Michelle Gayle
Chart (1994)	Peak position
Scottish Albums (OCC)	80
UK Albums (OCC)	30
UK R&B Albums (OCC)	5
