= Greatest Britons =

2007 awards show

Greatest Britons was a one-off awards show on ITV, celebrating the best of British talent. It is distinct from 100 Greatest Britons.

Greatest Britons recognises the most creative and successful people from across the UK who've achieved worldwide fame within their professional fields. The winners of most of the awards are decided by an expert panel of judges. The award of Greatest Living Briton is voted for by the public.

The awards aired on Monday 21 May 2007, with Kate Thornton as host, and they were produced by Shine Limited in association with The Sun and Marks & Spencer.

== Panelists ==
- Duncan Bannatyne
- Andrea Catherwood
- Lord Coe
- Richard Curtis
- Zac Goldsmith
- Colin Jackson
- Kelly Hoppen
- James King
- Trevor Nelson
- Kelly Osbourne
- Zandra Rhodes
- Stuart Rose
- June Sarpong

== 2007 Awards ==
- Greatest Living Briton
  - Winner: HM The Queen
  - Nominees: Dame Julie Andrews; Sir Paul McCartney; Baroness Margaret Thatcher; Robbie Williams
- The Arts
  - Winner: Banksy
  - Nominees: Antony Gormley; Sam Mendes
- Business
  - Winner: innocent Drinks
  - Nominees: Simon Fuller; Gordon Ramsay
- Campaigner
  - Winner: Duncan Goose
  - Nominees: Kierra Box; Shami Chakrabarti
- Fashion
  - Winner: Giles Deacon
  - Nominees: Christopher Bailey; Stella McCartney
- Film
  - Winner: Dame Helen Mirren
  - Nominees: Sacha Baron Cohen; Daniel Craig
- Import
  - Winner: David Beckham
- Music
  - Winner: Amy Winehouse
  - Nominees: Sir Elton John; Take That
- Sport
  - Winner: Sir Ranulph Fiennes
  - Nominees: Joe Calzaghe; Lewis Hamilton
- Television
  - Winner: Ricky Gervais
  - Nominees: Simon Cowell; Ashley Jensen
