= Tanyalee Davis =

Canadian-American comedian

- Born: 27 November 1970 (age 55); Winnipeg, Manitoba
- Website: tanyaleedavis.com

Tanyalee Davis (born 27 November 1970) is a Canadian-American comedian.

Davis has a form of dwarfism called diastrophic dysplasia and is 3 feet 6 inches (107 cm) tall.

== Career ==
In November 1999, she placed second in the Seattle Comedy Competition. She was the first woman in 10 years to make it into the finals. In October 2012, she placed sixth overall in the San Francisco Comedy Festival. In April 2001, she headlined at the Melbourne International Comedy Festival.

She won the 2003 Norman G. Brooks Standup Comedy Scholarship Competition held at the Hollywood Improv. In August 2003, she was part of the "US Comedy Invasion" show, performing at the world's largest arts festival, the Edinburgh Festival Fringe in Scotland. She then embarked on a UK tour in the spring of 2004. She featured at the Edinburgh Fringe again in 2013.

In the US, she was featured on Last Comic Standing in 2004, on Animal Planet's hit show, Pit Boss (2012) as well as Dr Drew on CNN. Previous credits include Austin Powers in Goldmember film teaser, "For the Love of Money"(Movie 2002), MTV's Bash of Carson Daly (TV 2003) and the Fox network's reality show 30 Seconds to Fame.

In 2005, she performed as part of the Abnormally Funny People show, with Steve Best, Liz Carr, Steve Day, Chris McCausland and Simon Minty. As part of the Edinburgh Festival Fringe the following year she appeared with Carr in Bravetarts. In 2007 she performed her one-woman show Little Do They Know. She then revamped the fringe show and had a six-month contract at the Clarion Hotel and Casino in Las Vegas in 2011.

In August 2013, Davis went back to the Edinburgh Fringe with her new one-person show "Big Trouble in Little 'Gina" which was based on a terrible medical ordeal starting at the end of 2012.

In 2011–2012, Davis was a series regular on Channel 4 TV show I'm Spazticus.

Davis was featured in a few British-produced programmes such as Sky TV's documentary of the making of Abnormally Funny People as well as ITV's SuperHuman: World's Smallest People (which also aired on TLC in the US). Her extensive spinal surgery was a focus in this show. On 28 August 2013, she appeared as a special guest on the live comedy Paralympics show The Last Leg, discussing Jim Davidson's comments about "midgets".

In 2015, she appeared on two major UK television shows, both on BBC: The John Bishop Show and Live at the Apollo.

On 15 July 2018, Davis was "harassed and humiliated" after a train guard for Great Western Railway attempted to force her to move her mobility scooter from a disabled space on the train. The guard made an announcement to the train passengers that she was "causing problems" and threatened to call the police if she did not move and give her space to a woman with a pram. An investigation into the incident was begun by the rail company. On 20 July 2018, Davis was left stranded on a train when staff at York railway station failed to arrive with a ramp, and the train departed for Darlington, adding an hour's delay to her journey. On 29 August 2018 it was reported that Davis had to wait two hours for her mobility scooter at Stansted Airport; she then found that airline Ryanair lost a vital attachment to the chair.
