= 71 Degrees North =

Reality television series on ITV

- Also known as: 71° North
- Genre: Reality
- Based on: 71° nord (1999–2020)
- Presented by: Gethin Jones and Kate Thornton (2010); Paddy McGuinness and Charlotte Jackson (2011)
- Country of origin: United Kingdom
- Original language: English
- No. of series: 2
- No. of episodes: 16

Production
- Production locations: North Cape, Norway
- Running time: 60 minutes (inc. adverts)
- Production companies: Fever Media; Nordisk Film TV

Original release
- Network: ITV
- Release: 11 September 2010 – 1 November 2011

Related
- 71° nord – Norges tøffeste kjendis (since 2010)

71 Degrees North is a reality television series on ITV which began broadcasting on 11 September 2010. Ten celebrities had to battle it out to see who would make it to the 71st parallel north, with challenges along the way. It returned for a second and final series in 2011.

== Broadcast ==
71 Degrees North is a British adaptation of the Norwegian television series 71° nord, which had been broadcast on TVNorge since 1999, and adapted in Sweden, Denmark, Poland, The Netherlands, and Belgium. The format was distributed by Banijay International. Mazda formerly sponsored the show, Continental tires were the final sponsors.

In the UK, the show was made by London-based production company Fever Media and finished broadcasting its first series on 2 November 2010. The show was aired at 9 pm on Tuesday nights. Series 1 hosts were Gethin Jones and Kate Thornton. Marcus Patric was crowned champion after a closely fought final with Gavin Henson in the first series.

A second series was commissioned by ITV and started airing on 13 September 2011 hosted by Paddy McGuinness and Charlotte Jackson with 12 celebrities taking part. As with the first series, the second series aired on Tuesday evenings at 9 pm. In 2011, six countries acquired both series of the UK version. They were: TV Norge, Network Ten in Australia, TVNZ in New Zealand, Sic in Portugal, TV5 in Finland and Évasion in Canada.

== Format ==
The show followed ten (twelve in the second series) celebrities who attempted to make it to the North Cape at 71 degrees north. The contestants are split into Blue and Red teams at the start of each Challenge. The team that wins each challenge gets to stay in a log cabin, while the losing team has to camp. The winner of immunity from the previous Challenge becomes captain of one of the teams. At the end of each episode, the celebrity who performed worst on that day's challenge was eliminated.

== Series 1 (2010) ==
Marcus Patric was crowned champion after a closely fought final with Gavin Henson.

=== Episodes ===
Series One (2010)
Episode	Celebrity eliminated	Airdate
1	Lauren Socha	11 September
2	Konnie Huq	14 September
3	Diarmuid Gavin	21 September
4	Michelle Mone	28 September
5	Shane Richie	5 October
6	Andrew Castle	19 October
7	Joe Absolom	26 October
8	Susie Amy (3rd Place)	2 November
8	Gavin Henson (Runner-up)	2 November
8	Marcus Patrick (Winner)	2 November

=== Celebrities ===
Celebrity	Occupation	Status
Lauren Socha	Misfits actress	Eliminated 1st on 11 September 2010
Konnie Huq	Blue Peter presenter	Eliminated 2nd on 14 September 2010
Diarmuid Gavin	Garden designer & television presenter	Eliminated 3rd on 21 September 2010
Michelle Mone	Model & entrepreneur	Eliminated 3rd on 28 September 2010
Shane Richie	EastEnders actor	Eliminated 4th on 5 October 2010
Andrew Castle	Retired tennis player & GMTV presenter	Eliminated 5th on 19 October 2010
Joe Absolom	Former EastEnders actor	Eliminated 6th on 26 October 2010
Susie Amy	Footballer's Wives actress	Third Place on 2 November 2010
Gavin Henson	Wales rugby player	Runner-Up on 2 November 2010
Marcus Patric	Hollyoaks actor	Winner on 2 November 2010

=== Challenges ===
In episode 6, the winning team had the chance to spend the night in an Ice Hotel. Joe took this opportunity, Andrew opted for a warmer log cabin.

Episode	Team Event or Immunity Challenge	Challenge	Winner(s)
1	Team Event:	Dog Sledding	Blue Team
1	Team Event:	Each team must dog sled to collect their camping equipment, then, get to the camping site. After a night stop, both teams race to the finish line. The race length is 30 km.	Blue Team
1	Immunity Challenge:	Ice Swim	Gavin Henson
1	Immunity Challenge:	Each person in each team must go into freezing water, and whoever swims the furthest will be guaranteed a place in the next expedition.	Gavin Henson
2	Team Event:	Stretcher Race	Red Team
2	Team Event:	A team member is tied to a stretcher and the first team to get to the end has to cross a ravine by rope with the stretcher to win.	Red Team
2	Immunity Challenge:	Ice Climb	Joe Absolom
2	Immunity Challenge:	Each person must climb an ice wall..Whoever climbs the fastest/furthest wins immunity in the second vote off.	Joe Absolom
3	Team Event:	Snow Cave Digging	Blue Team
3	Team Event:	Each team must find an equipment package using a tracker and then build a snow cave to sleep in that night. To win, the teams must build the cave to specific regulations.	Blue Team
3	Immunity Challenge:	Rope Holding	Gavin Henson; Andrew Castle
3	Immunity Challenge:	One partner holds a rope that is hoist over a tree, while the other is attached to it. The two teams who hold on the longest compete in the final.	Gavin Henson; Andrew Castle
4	Team Event:	Cliffhanger	Red Team
4	Team Event:	Each team must trek 5 km to spend the night in a tent hanging from separate vertical cliffs. The following day, one member of each team must climb to the top of their cliff and traverse on ropes to the opposite cliff to collect a flag and then, return it to the starting point.	Red Team
4	Immunity Challenge:	Reindeer Race	Shane Richie
4	Immunity Challenge:	Each contestant must race around a track on a sled pulled by a Reindeer. The winner of each race will progress to the next round. Susie Amy received a bye from the first heat due to the odd number of contestants.	Shane Richie
5	Team Event:	Snow Mobile Race	Red Team
5	Team Event:	Each team must race by snow mobile to the top of a frozen waterfall which, they will then abseil back down. Once at the bottom, they must melt a block of ice to get the key to the luxury cabin. The team with the fastest time in each stage will get a head start in the next. (The blue team were invited by the reds to share the log cabin with them due to the extreme cold temperatures.)	Red Team
5	Immunity Challenge:	Frozen River Assault Course	Gavin Henson
5	Immunity Challenge:	Each contestant must race around the course and then complete a math problem. The person with the fastest time avoids elimination.Failing or not completing the math problem in 2 minutes adds 5 minutes to their time.	Gavin Henson
6	Team Event:	Race and Reindeer Herding	Blue Team; Andrew & Joe
6	Team Event:	Each team must race 40 miles on snow mobiles to the camp site where, they must construct and spend the night in a Lavvu. The first team to reach camp will take a 5-minute lead into tomorrow. Due to dangerously cold temperatures, the teams stayed in a log cabin rather than the Lavvu that night. The following day, the teams must herd 3000 reindeer over a distance of 2.5 km. The team with the fastest time wins.	Blue Team; Andrew & Joe
6	Immunity Challenge:	Tobogganing	Joe Absolom
6	Immunity Challenge:	Each contestant will compete in a time trail down the 500m course to decide who progresses to the semi-finals and then the final. The winner will be immune from the vote off.	Joe Absolom
7	Team Event:	Hell Race	Red Team; Joe & Marcus
7	Team Event:	Each team must hike to the bottom of a canyon and set up camp. The first team to reach camp will take a 15-minute lead into tomorrow. The following day, the teams must build a sledge out of their equipment and pull it a further 9 km to the finish line.	Red Team; Joe & Marcus
7	Immunity Challenge:	Dangling from a Dam	Gavin Henson
7	Immunity Challenge:	Each contestant must run across the face of a dam 110m high and collect a series of flags from boxes in numerical order..The fastest contestant wins immunity.	Gavin Henson
8	Semi Final:	Swim Under a Frozen Lake	Winner: Marcus Eliminated: Susie
8	Semi Final:	Each contestant must swim under a frozen lake into holes cut in the ice. Susie was Eliminated at this stage as she swam 2 holes in the ice in 33 seconds compared to Gavin's 20 seconds, Marcus swam to the 3rd hole and automatically progressed to the Final Challenge.	Winner: Marcus Eliminated: Susie
8	The Final:	Race to 71 Degrees North	Series Winner: Marcus Patric
8	The Final:	In the first part of the final, both contestants must hike 2 km to the camp site..The winner chooses to sleep in the tent or the snow cave and has the opportunity to dig for a luxury food package. The following day, the contestants must race by dog sled for 20 km, the winner will take the winning margin into the next stage. In stage 3, the finalists must run to and then make their way across a 35m rope crossing, 100m above the Arctic. Once across, they must sprint to the finish line and set a beacon on fire. The first to light it is the Champion.	Series Winner: Marcus Patric

== Series 2 (2011) ==
On 1 March 2011, ITV confirmed that a second series has been commissioned and would begin airing on 13 September 2011, lasting 8 weeks before finishing on 1 November 2011.

=== Episodes ===
Series Two (2011)
Episode	Celebrity eliminated	Airdate
1	Nicky Clarke	13 September
2	Sean Maguire (withdrew)	20 September
2	John Thomson	20 September
3	Martin Kemp (withdrew)	27 September
3	Lisa Maxwell	27 September
4	John Barnes	4 October
5	Charlie Dimmock (withdrew)	11 October
5	John Barnes	11 October
6	Richard Arnold	18 October
7 (Semi-Final)	Brooke Kinsella	25 October
8 (Final)	Amy Williams (3rd Place)	1 November
8 (Final)	Angelica Bell (Runner-up)	1 November
8 (Final)	**Rav Wilding** (Winner)	1 November

=== Celebrities ===
On 18 July 2011, the 10 confirmed celebrities for Series 2 were revealed, They were:

Celebrity	Occupation	Status
Nicky Clarke	Celebrity hairdresser	Eliminated 1st on 13 September 2011
Sean Maguire	Television actor	Withdrew on 20 September 2011
John Thomson	Comedian	Eliminated 2nd on 20 September 2011
Martin Kemp	EastEnders actor & singer	Withdrew on 27 September 2011
Lisa Maxwell	Actress & Loose Women panelist	Eliminated 3rd on 27 September 2011
Charlie Dimmock	Garden designer & television presenter	Withdrew on 11 October 2011
John Barnes	Former England footballer	Eliminated 4th on 4/11 October 2011
Richard Arnold	Daybreak presenter	Eliminated 5th on 18 October 2011
Brooke Kinsella	Former EastEnders actress	Eliminated 6th on 25 October 2011
Amy Williams	Olympic skeleton racer	Third Place on 1 November 2011
Angellica Bell	Television & radio presenter	Runner-Up on 1 November 2011
**Rav Wilding**	**Crimewatch presenter**	**Winner** on 1 November 2011

=== Challenges ===
Team captains are in Bold.

Episode	Team Event or Immunity Challenge	Challenge	Winner(s)
**1**	Team Event:	**Dog Sledding**	Red Team; **Sean**, Amy, Angellica, Charlie & Rav
**1**	Team Event:	Each team must dog sled to collect their camping equipment, then, get to the camping site. After a night stop, both teams race to the finish line. The race length is 30 km.	Red Team; **Sean**, Amy, Angellica, Charlie & Rav
**1**	Immunity Challenge:	**Ice Swim**	Rav Wilding
**1**	Immunity Challenge:	Each person in each team must go into freezing water, and whoever swims the furthest will be guaranteed a place in the next expedition.	Rav Wilding
**2**	Team Event:	**Trawler Dive and Abseil Race**	Red Team; **Rav**, Brooke, Charlie, Martin & Sean
**2**	Team Event:	The teams must dive off a boat into a lake and then swim to shore. Once on shore they make their way to a cliff where they will abseil face-down before racing to the finish line.	Red Team; **Rav**, Brooke, Charlie, Martin & Sean
**2**	Immunity Challenge:	**The Hangover**	Amy Williams
**2**	Immunity Challenge:	Each contestant must hold onto a rope which is tied to the underside of a bridge, when they can't hold on any longer they will drop. The contestant to hold on the longest wins, and will be immune from the weeks vote off.	Amy Williams
**3**	Team Event:	**Buried Alive**	Red Team; **Amy**, Angellica, Rav & Richard
**3**	Team Event:	The two teams compete in a relay-race up a mountain. The teams will start as a group before dropping off one contestant at a time as they reach a crate. The dropped off contestant then digs a hole where they will stay whilst the rest of the team continue. This repeats until the final team member reaches the top. The first dropped off contestant then continues up the mountain collecting the other teammates. The first team to have all members at the top first, wins.	Red Team; **Amy**, Angellica, Rav & Richard
**3**	Immunity Challenge:	**Tobogganing**	Amy Williams
**3**	Immunity Challenge:	Each contestant will compete in a time trail down the 500m course to decide who progresses to the semi-finals and then the final of the challenge. The winner of the final will be immune from the vote off.	Amy Williams
**4**	Team Event:	**Kidnapped**	Red Team; **Amy**, Angellica & Charlie
**4**	Team Event:	Two team captains are "kidnapped" and locked in individual huts, whilst their teams battle through a course, being navigated by the team captains using walkie-talkies. The team to reach the hut and unlock their team captains first, wins.	Red Team; **Amy**, Angellica & Charlie
**4**	Immunity Challenge:	**Ice Plunge**	Rav Wilding
**4**	Immunity Challenge:	Each contestant will jump into a pool of frozen water, stay in for 60 seconds before climbing out, stripping down to their underwear and then run to the finish line. The fastest contestant will be immune from the vote off.	Rav Wilding
**5**	Team Event:	**Cliffhanger**	Blue Team; **Angellica**, Amy & Richard
**5**	Team Event:	Each team must climb up the side of a cliff face to reach their overnight tents, which hang off the side of the cliff. The first team to their respective tents win a luxury food package. The following day the teams must zip-wire from the top of the cliff to reach a flag, they must collect the flag before restarting the descent to the end point. The first team across, wins.	Blue Team; **Angellica**, Amy & Richard
**5**	Immunity Challenge:	**Reindeer Race**	Brooke Kinsella
**5**	Immunity Challenge:	Each contestant must race around a track on a sled pulled by a Reindeer. The loser of each heat will be out, and not progress to the semi. The winners of the heat will face the runners-up, with the winners of the semis reaching the final.	Brooke Kinsella
**6**	Team Event:	**The Decision**	Red Team; **Brooke** & Rav
**6**	Team Event:	The teams must walk 5 km through the snow until they reach a canyon. To cross the canyon the teams have to go via a cargo net which spans the 30-metre gap. They then race to a checkpoint where the first team there has to make a decision about which route to take next. The routes can either be 8 km on snowmobiles or 2 km on cross-country skis, the other team must take the alternate route. The first team to the finish line wins a night in the Ice Hotel.	Red Team; **Brooke** & Rav
**6**	Immunity Challenge:	**Icy Assault Course**	Rav Wilding
**6**	Immunity Challenge:	Each contestant must climb an ice wall and on their way they must collect 5 letters. They then zip wire to the bottom where they must spell out a word using the letters. Whoever completes the challenge in the fastest time wins immunity.	Rav Wilding
**7** (Semi-Final)	Team Event:	**The Epic Race**	Blue Team; **Amy** & Brooke
**7** (Semi-Final)	Team Event:	The first section of the race sees the contestants tandem kayak from one side of a lake to the other. Then the contestants must head on to their camp, via a checkpoint, 10 km away. The following morning the contestants must walk through the snow to another checkpoint, before continuing their walk where they will reach a dog sled. The contestants will then race on the sledges to the finish line. The first team to reach the finish line will win a night of luxury.	Blue Team; **Amy** & Brooke
**7** (Semi-Final)	Final Immunity Challenge:	**Hell Drop**	Amy Williams
**7** (Semi-Final)	Final Immunity Challenge:	Each contestant must descend down a wire ladder hanging over the edge of a canyon passing flags on the way down. Once at the very bottom of the ladder, they must climb back up to the top. The fastest contestant wins immunity and a place in the final.	Amy Williams
**8**	Final challenge:	**Swim Under a Frozen Lake**	Winners: Angellica Eliminated: Amy
**8**	Final challenge:	The three finalists must survive the night in a hand-built snow cave before swimming under the ice of a frozen lake. Angelica is the only contestant from both series to complete this challenge by reaching the.fourth and final ice hole in about 90 seconds.	Winners: Angellica Eliminated: Amy
**8**	The Final:	**Race to 71 Degrees North**	Series Winner: Rav Wilding
**8**	The Final:	The remaining two finalists then face the challenge of crossing a single rope suspended 300m above the ground in the race to the finish line. Before reaching the rope climb, each contestant much race on snowmobiles to their chest containing their harness equipment and melt a key inside a block of ice needed to open their chest.	Series Winner: Rav Wilding

== Transmissions ==
Series	Start date	End date	Episodes
1	11 September 2010	2 November 2010	8
2	13 September 2011	1 November 2011	8

== International versions ==
The concept has been sold to several countries. The Danish, Belgium/Netherlands and UK versions were all filmed in Norway. The other series were recorded in the respective countries. Around 2000 or 2001, German broadcaster RTL2 were sold the format but no series was made.

Legend: Ongoing Finished

Country	Local name	Host(s)	TV station	Top prize	Airdate
Belgium; Netherlands	71° noord	Evi Hanssen (2006, 2008); Ernst-Paul Hasselbach (2008); Ruben Nicolai and Leki (2009–10)	(Belgium) 2BE (2006, 2008); Vtm (2009–10) (Netherlands) RTL 5 (2008); AVRO (2009–10)	€50,000	2006, 2008, 2009–10
Canada; United States	No Boundaries	Troy Hartman	Global TV (Canada); The WB Television Network (Note: Cancelled after 4 episodes due to low ratings; later picked up by OLN); OLN (USA)	Ford Explorer Sport Trac + $100,000	2002
Denmark	71° nord	Unknown (2001); Nicolai Moltke-Leth (2002)	TV Danmark	Suzuki Grand Vitara (2001); Safari in Kenya + Luxus bathing holiday (value 100,000 DKr)	2001–02
Norway	71° nord (1999–2020); 71° nord – Norges tøffeste kjendis (celebrity version, 2010–)	Tom Stiansen (2006–); Elin Tvedt (2001–05); Tom Strømnæss (2000); Janne Horgen Friberg (1999)	TVNorge	New car + Prize money for completing tasks (2009–)	1999–
Poland	Ekspedycja	Radosław Pazura	TVN	Subaru Forester GL 4WD	2001
Sweden	69° nord	Kim Rydeheim	Kanal5	Trip around the World (2 persons)	2001
Switzerland	Abenteuer Schweiz	Björn Hering	TV3	75,000 CHF (+ Ice axe as trophy)	2000
