= Sensational (Michelle Gayle album) =

Studio album by Michelle Gayle
- Released: 1997 (UK)
- Length: 49:24
- Label: RCA; BMG
- Producer: Vassal Benford; Johnny Douglas; Mike Mani; Claytoven Richardson; Narada Michael Walden

Michelle Gayle chronology
Michelle Gayle (1994)	Sensational (1997)	Looking Up (2000)

Sensational is the second album by the British R&B-soul singer Michelle Gayle, released in 1997. It includes three singles which reached the UK Top 20: "Do You Know" (UK #6), "Sensational" (UK #14) and the remixed version of "Happy Just to Be with You" (UK #11), which had been released as a single in 1995. The original version of the song appeared on Gayle's self-titled debut album.

== Critical reception ==
Professional ratings
Review scores
Source	Rating
AllMusic	3/5 stars
Music Week	4/5 stars
NME	5/10

AllMusic editor Stephen Thomas Erlewine rated the album three ouf of five stars. He wrote that "while Gaye is in strong voice throughout the record and the album has an alluring, classy production, the material is generally colorless, relying more on style than substance." Music Week found that "this sultry album flavoured at turns by soul, disco and acoustic guitars, has the big songs necessary to showcase Gayle's impressive voice."

== Track listing ==
Sensational track listing
No.	Title	Writer(s)	Producer(s)	Length
1.	"Fly Away"	David Williams; Steve Russell; Vassal Benford	Benford; Russell^{[a]}; Harvey Mason, Jr.^{[a]}	3:24
2.	"Do You Know"	Michelle Gayle; Sheppard Solomon	Johnny Douglas	3:38
3.	"Sensational"	Gayle; Solomon	Douglas	3:09
4.	"Working Overtime"	Gayle; Solomon; Douglas	Douglas	3:48
5.	"Don't Keep Me Waiting"	Mason; Benford	Benford; Russell^{[a]}; Mason^{[a]}	4:33
6.	"No Place Like Home"	Gayle; Solomon	Douglas	6:07
7.	"It's a High"	Gayle; Solomon; Douglas	Douglas	4:06
8.	"Yesterday"	Mason; Benford	Benford; Russell^{[a]}; Mason^{[a]}	4:26
9.	"Talk It Over"	Gayle; Solomon	Douglas	4:46
10.	"Fakin' It"	Mason; Benford	Benford; Russell^{[a]}; Mason^{[a]}	3:28
11.	"Fly Away" (Interlude)	Williams; Russell; Benford	Benford; Russell^{[a]}; Mason^{[a]}	3:45
12.	"Happy Just to Be with You" (Nigel Lowis Remix)	Gayle; Narada Michael Walden; Preston Glass	Walden; Claytoven Richardson; Mike Mani; Nigel Lowis^{[b]}	3:51
Total length:				49:24

Notes

- ^{^[a]} signifies co-producer(s)
- ^{^[b]} signifies additional producer(s)

Sample credits

- "Talk It Over" contains a sample from "For the Love of You" (1975) as written and performed by The Isley Brothers.

== Charts ==
Weekly chart performance for Michelle Gayle
Chart (1997)	Peak position
UK Albums Chart	17
