= Sweetness (Michelle Gayle song) =

1994 single by Michelle Gayle

Single by Michelle Gayle

from the album Michelle Gayle
- B-side: "Say What's on Your Mind"; "Looking Up"
- Released: 12 September 1994
- Genre: R&B; pop
- Length: 3:41
- Label: RCA; 1st Avenue
- Songwriters: Narada Michael Walden; Preston Glass
- Producers: Narada Michael Walden; Preston Glass

Michelle Gayle singles chronology
"Looking Up" (1993)	"Sweetness" (1994)	"I'll Find You" (1994)

"Sweetness" is a song by British R&B-soul singer, songwriter, actress and author Michelle Gayle, released on 12 September 1994, by RCA and 1st Avenue Records, as the second single from Gayle's eponymous debut album (1994). It is her most successful hit single, reaching number four on the UK Singles Chart and number one on the UK R&B Singles Chart. It also peaked within the top 40 in New Zealand and several countries across Europe, including Denmark, where it entered the top 10 and peaked at number seven. The accompanying music video was directed by Randee St. Nicholas.

== Critical reception ==
In his weekly UK chart commentary, James Masterton wrote, "The follow-up has been a long time in coming but has been well worth the wait, belying the soap origins of the singer. Radio loves it to death, hence this high entry and I would be very surprised if this does not scrape a Top 10 placing." He added, "Its the kind of single that grows on you with each play". A reviewer from Music & Media commented, "Like tea-for-one, there's now also new jill swing for individuals. The radio mix is the sweetest, but the West End mix is far more adventurous and memorable." Alan Jones from Music Week wrote, "Penned by Narada Michael Walden and Preston Glass, it's quite odd with some ill-advised spoken segments alongside the better sung parts. It never gets into overdrive, but will still be a hit." Emma Forrest from NME viewed it as "disconcertingly cheery". Female pop-punk music duo Shampoo reviewed the song for Smash Hits, giving it a score of two out of five. Rob Pendry of Swansea Sound called it "excellent" and concluded that "Sweetness" set a "great future" for Gayle, proving she could branch out from her acting career. In 2012, the Official UK Chart named "Sweetness" a "pop gem" and a "sparkling piece of sheer pop brilliance".

== Music video ==
The music video for "Sweetness" was directed by American director Randee St. Nicholas and choreographed by Fatima Robinson. It consists of footage in both black-and-white and colours. "Sweetness" was a Box Top on British music television channel The Box in October 1994. Later, it received "break out" rotation on MTV Europe and was C-listed on German VIVA in December 1994.

== Track listings ==
- UK, European, and Australian CD single
1. "Sweetness" (radio mix)
2. "Sweetness" (West End mix)
3. "Say What's on Your Mind"
4. "Looking Up" (radio mix)
- UK 7-inch and cassette single
1. "Sweetness" (radio mix)
2. "Looking Up" (radio mix)
3. "Say What's on Your Mind"
- UK 12-inch single

A1. "Sweetness" (West End mix)
A2. "Sweetness" (Steve Jervier mix)
B1. "Sweetness" (the Mellow Drum & Bass mix)
B2. "Sweetness" (the All In mix)

- French CD single and Japanese mini-CD single
1. "Sweetness" (radio mix)
2. "Sweetness" (West End mix)

== Charts ==
=== Weekly charts ===
Chart (1994–1995)	Peak position
Denmark (IFPI)	7
Europe (Eurochart Hot 100)	18
Europe (European AC Radio)	14
Europe (European Dance Radio)	5
Europe (European Hit Radio)	15
Germany (GfK)	53
Ireland (IRMA)	11
Israel (Israeli Singles Chart)	24
Netherlands (Dutch Top 40)	40
Netherlands (Single Top 100)	38
New Zealand (Recorded Music NZ)	27
Scottish Singles Sales (Official Charts)	6
Switzerland (Schweizer Hitparade)	21
UK Singles (Official Charts)	4
UK Dance (Official Charts)	18
UK Hip Hop/R&B (Official Charts)	1
UK Airplay (Music Week)	3
UK Dance (Music Week)	18
UK Club Chart (Music Week)	3

=== Year-end charts ===
Chart (1994)	Position
UK Singles (OCC)	36

== Certifications ==
Region	Certification	Certified units/sales
United Kingdom (BPI)	Silver	200,000^{^}
^{^} Shipments figures based on certification alone.

== Release history ==
Region	Date	Format(s)	Label(s)	Ref(s).
United Kingdom	12 September 1994	7-inch vinyl; 12-inch vinyl; CD; cassette	RCA; 1st Avenue	
Australia	10 October 1994	CD; cassette	RCA; 1st Avenue	
Japan	8 March 1995	Mini-CD	RCA	
