= Michelle Gayle =

British singer

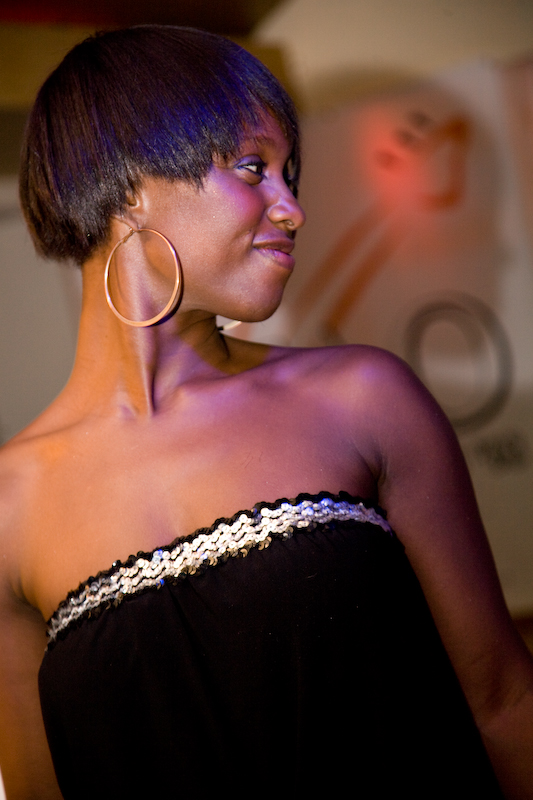
- Gayle in 2008

Background information
- Born: Michelle Patricia Gayle; 2 February 1971 (age 55)
- Origin: Harlesden, London, England
- Genres: R&B; soul
- Occupations: Singer; songwriter; author; screenwriter; actress
- Years active: 1988–present
- Labels: RCA (1993–1997); EMI (1997–1999); N2 Records (2003–2005)
- Spouse: Mark Bright (m. 1995; div. 2008)

Michelle Patricia Gayle (born 2 February 1971) is a British singer, songwriter, actress and writer. Gayle had success as a soul and R&B singer in the 1990s, having achieved seven top-40 singles in the UK Singles Chart. These include "Sweetness" and "Do You Know". She released two top 40 albums through RCA Records but they parted company in 1997, and although Gayle has recorded other albums, they have not been released.

As an actress, Gayle is known for her work on television, in particular playing Hattie Tavernier in BBC's EastEnders from 1990 to 1993. She has also had various roles in film and theatre, such as playing Belle in the West End musical Beauty and the Beast in 1999. She has taken part in several celebrity-based reality television shows, and, in June 2007, she became a panellist for ITV's topical chatshow Loose Women. Gayle also branched out into writing, and the rights to her first novel were acquired by Walker Books in 2010. The book, Pride and Premiership, was published on 5 May 2011.

== Acting, presenting and personal appearances ==
=== Acting ===
==== 1987–88 ====
Gayle was born in 1971 in the northwest part of London, in the Harlesden area. She attended the Barbara Speake Stage School in Acton, west London, at a time when Naomi Campbell, Amma Asante and Kwame Kwei-Armah were also attending. She first became publicly known when she appeared in the children's BBC television programme Grange Hill in 1988 and 1989 as Fiona Wilson, who was most notably part of a rap duo named Fresh 'n' Fly.

==== 1990–1993 ====
Gayle later appeared as an extra in TV drama London's Burning and in the Children's ITV television programme Press Gang in 1990 as a background member of the news team, and that same year she won the role of Hattie Tavernier in the BBC soap opera EastEnders. The introduction of the Tavernier family heralded the first time that an entire family had joined the programme all at once. Their introduction was also a well-intentioned attempt to portray a wider range of black characters than had previously been achieved on the show. Gayle's character remained in the show for three years as Ian Beale's PA and was featured in an array of storylines including being abandoned by her fiancé Steve Elliot (Mark Monero) and suffering a miscarriage as a result. However, music was always Gayle's first passion, and in 1993 she left EastEnders to pursue a singing career.

==== 1999 onwards ====
In 1999, Gayle played Belle, the lead female, in Disney's Beauty and the Beast, and she returned to television acting in 2003, guest-starring in the BBC television dramas Doctors and Holby City. She went on to play the role of Lara in the Five soap opera Family Affairs (2005), and played the lead female character, Yvonne, in the film Joy Division, which was released in November 2006. The film tells the story of a German boy who is orphaned in World War II and then groomed as a KGB sleeper. Gayle starred in Jason Barrett's British feature film The Naked Poet as character Joanne; it was screened in London's Mayfair Hotel in December 2011.

On stage, she played the role of Brenda in Angie Le Mar's The Brothers at the Hackney Empire in April 2006, and she went on to play Jill in Pat Ashworth's ensemble stage production Mum's the Word, which toured the UK from February to June 2007. She appeared in the CBBC series Wolfblood as Imara.

In March 2018, she began playing the role of Alison in the musical Son of a Preacher Man, which is based on the life of Dusty Springfield.

In November 2019, she began playing the role of Hermione Granger in the West End production of Harry Potter and the Cursed Child.

=== Presenting and reality television ===
Gayle was a contestant on ITV's reality-television show Reborn in the USA, competing against artists such as Elkie Brooks, Sonia, Gina G, Leee John and Tony Hadley. Gayle made it to the final and finished second behind Hadley. In 2004, Gayle presented the UMA Awards with ex-EastEnder Gary Beadle, and in 2005, she appeared as a celebrity mentor on the Five documentary Pushy Parents.

In March 2006, she took part in the fourth series of the Channel 4 reality-television show The Games, competing against various other celebrities in a series of sports events. Gayle came third in the competition and raised more than £5,000 for her chosen charity, the Willow Foundation. She later became a guest panellist on ITV's topical chatshow Loose Women, in June 2007.

In June 2009, it was announced that Gayle would be one of several celebrities competing in Dancing on Wheels, BBC's spin-off show to the reality television competition Strictly Come Dancing. Dancing on Wheels paired able-bodied celebrities with those in wheelchairs. The winning pair represented the UK at the Wheelchair Dance Sport European Championships in Israel in October 2009. Gayle and partner Harry Maule reached the semi-finals, but were beaten in the dance-off by Diana Morgan-Hill and Olympic swimmer Mark Foster.

== Musical career ==
=== 1993–1998 ===
Before she gained commercial success, Gayle sang with a rap duo called R-MOR-FUS, performing gigs at various clubs and low-key venues. In 1993, while she was still on the cast of EastEnders, Gayle signed with RCA Records and launched herself as a solo artist. Her debut single "Looking Up" reached number 11. By 1994, she had her biggest-selling single to date, "Sweetness", which reached number 4, spent 16 weeks in the UK Singles Chart and was certified silver, selling more than 300,000 copies. Gayle had further chart success in 1994 with the number-26 hit "I'll Find You"; in 1995 with the number-16 "Freedom"; and the number-11 "Happy Just to Be with You" which sampled The Sugar Hill Gang's "Rapper's Delight" and Chic's "Good Times". These five singles were taken from Gayle's self-titled debut album Michelle Gayle, which was released in 1994, peaked at number 30 in the UK Albums Chart, and was certified gold.

Gayle also appeared on the Childliners charity record "The Gift of Christmas" in 1995, alongside acts such as Backstreet Boys, Boyzone, E.Y.C., Sean Maguire, Deuce, Ultimate Kaos, Let Loose, East 17, Peter Andre, MN8, Dannii Minogue and many more. It peaked at number 9.

Gayle returned in 1997 with her sixth single, "Do You Know", which reached number 6. This was followed by the song "Sensational", which reached number 14. Both singles were taken from Gayle's second album, Sensational, which had multiple producers, and was recorded in both London and Los Angeles. Despite Sensational being praised by critics, the album had disappointing sales. It entered the album chart at number 17, but quickly fell out of the top 40 the following week. Due to poor album sales, Gayle left RCA. During the time she was signed to the label, Gayle received three BRIT Award nominations: two in 1995 for 'Best Single' and 'Best Female Artist', and one in 1998 for 'Best Female Artist'.

=== 1999–2004 ===
Following her departure from RCA, Gayle signed with EMI. She recorded an album for that label, but due to an artist rostering re-shuffle, she had left the company by 1999 before the album was released. After leaving EMI in 1999, Gayle took to the West End stage and played Belle in Disney's Beauty and the Beast. After an extended break from show business to look after her son, Isaiah, Gayle began developing her music production company M Media Productions. She also appeared on other artists' albums, including those of Ivan Matias, Me One, Shabba and Lemon D.

In 2003, Gayle accepted the offer to appear in the reality television series Reborn in the USA, a televised singing competition where former British pop acts were transported to the US, with the hope of revitalising their music careers. Gayle finished second in the competition, taking runner-up position to Tony Hadley in the final. Following her success on the programme, Gayle began working on new material.

Gayle reinvented herself as a UK R&B artist, and worked on material for her third album with New York record producer Terence Dudley – famous for working on 50 Cent's album Get Rich or Die Tryin'. At the end of 2004, Gayle appeared on several TV shows promoting the release of her new single, "Gotta Be Me", but the single was pulled before its release. In an interview with The Voice newspaper in April 2006, she divulged that she did make a new album, but her record company (N2 Records) folded.

=== Eurovision 2008 ===
Gayle was one of the participants of the pre-selection stage of Eurovision – Your Decision, which determined who the United Kingdom would send to the Eurovision Song Contest in Serbia on 24 May 2008. Gayle co-wrote her song, "Woo (U Make Me)", with Rashelle Davies and Morten Schjolin, and described it as "pop in essence, but with a very cool 60's vibe to it". Gayle came second in the public vote on 1 March 2008, behind Andy Abraham.

=== 2020s ===
In June 2023 Gayle made a surprise appearance on stage at singer Louise's concert at the Shepherd's Bush Empire to perform "Sweetness".

== Writing career ==
During an interview with the Blackpool Gazette in February 2007, Gayle mentioned that she was in the process of writing her first novel. The plot involved an unpleasant TV talent-show judge who discovers he is dying. She said: "It's sort of fiction but not fiction but it is made up and true, so when you read it you'll see it's fictional but also real, and I hope it explains a few things about the pop business." It was never published.

Walker Books acquired the rights to Gayle's novel, Pride and Premiership, in 2010 and the book was published on 5 May 2011. The novel, aimed at a teen market, depicts the story of two girls who aspire to be WAGs, or wives/girlfriends of football players. Gayle, who was once married to a professional footballer, has commented, "In the time of Jane Austen's Pride & Prejudice a woman had to get married to support herself. We’ve got to an age where a woman can support herself but still wants to marry a footballer to support her. I'm not WAG-bashing or footballer-bashing, I just want girls to make informed decisions about their future."

She has also written for television, contributing episodes of Wolfblood and A Discovery of Witches.

== Personal life ==
Gayle was married to ex-professional footballer and football pundit Mark Bright for ten years, and had one son with him. The couple separated in 2007 and divorced on 18 April 2008. Gayle is godmother to the daughter of the actress Jacqui Gordon-Lawrence, who played her on-screen mother, Etta Tavernier, in EastEnders. Gayle is a teetotaller and does not eat meat. On 4 August 2011 it was announced on The Wright Stuff that she was pregnant. On Twitter, she announced the birth of her son on 2 November 2011.

== Discography ==
Michelle Gayle discography
- Studio albums: 2
- Compilation albums: 1
- Singles: 10

=== Albums ===
Title	Album details	Peak chart positions			Certifications
Title	Album details	UK	UK R&B	SCO	Certifications
Michelle Gayle	Released: 10 July 1994; Label: RCA/1st Avenue (74321234122); Formats: CS, CD	30	5	80	UK: Gold
Sensational	Released: 28 April 1997; Label: RCA/1st Avenue (74321419322); Formats: CS, CD	17	7	32	
Looking Up	Released: 21 August 2000; Label: RCA/1st Avenue (74321766792); Formats: CD	—	—	—	
"—" denotes items that did not chart or were not released in that territory.

=== Singles ===
Year	Title	Peak chart positions										Certifications	Album
Year	Title	UK	UK Dance	UK R&B	EUR	GER	IRE	NED	NZ	SCO	SWI	Certifications	Album
1993	"Looking Up"	11	—	—	—	—	—	—	—	—	—		Michelle Gayle
1994	"Sweetness"	4	18	1	18	53	11	38	27	6	21	UK: Silver	Michelle Gayle
1994	"I'll Find You"	26	8	3	79	—	—	—	—	24	—		Michelle Gayle
1995	"Freedom"	16	6	2	38	—	—	—	—	31	—		Michelle Gayle
1995	"Happy Just to Be with You"	11	13	2	31	66	—	40	44	18	—		Michelle Gayle
1997	"Do You Know"	6	—	2	44	—	—	—	—	7	—		Sensational
1997	"Sensational"	14	—	7	85	—	—	—	—	20	—		Sensational
2004	"Got to Be Me"	—	—	—	—	—	—	—	—	—	—		Non-album singles
2008	"Woo (U Make Me)"	—	—	—	—	—	—	—	—	—	—		Non-album singles
2018	"You Don't Have to Say You Love Me"	—	—	—	—	—	—	—	—	—	—		Non-album singles
"—" denotes items that did not chart or were not released in that territory.

=== B-sides and other tracks ===
- "Say What's on Your Mind" ("Sweetness" B-side/Michelle Gayle album track)
- "Tell Me" ("I'll Find You" B-side)
- "I Thought I Was Your Lady" ("Happy Just to Be with You" B-side)
- "Juicy" ("Sensational" B-side)
- "Give Me a Try" ("Sensational" B-side)
- "Sunshine After Rain" ("Sensational" B-side)
- "Until You Come Back to Me" (Reborn in the USA album track)
- "Love Me Tender" (Reborn in the USA album track)
- "Got to Be Me" (unreleased single)
- "Don't Want It" ("Got to Be Me" unreleased B-side)
