= The People's Quiz =

2007 British game show

- Genre: Game show
- Presented by: Jamie Theakston
- Starring: William G. Stewart; Myleene Klass; Kate Garraway
- Country of origin: United Kingdom
- Original language: English
- No. of series: 1
- No. of episodes: 12

Production
- Running time: 60 minutes
- Production company: Fever Media

Original release
- Network: BBC One
- Release: 24 March – 23 June 2007

Related
- The National Lottery Draws

The People's Quiz (originally known as The National Lottery People's Quiz) is a BBC National Lottery game show broadcast on BBC One from 24 March to 23 June 2007, hosted by Jamie Theakston and featuring William G. Stewart, Myleene Klass and Kate Garraway as the 'Quiz Panel', who asked the questions to the contestants.

The show originally featured National Lottery branding, with the National Lottery draws taking place during the programme. Following poor ratings and negative reaction from critics, the National Lottery cut its association with the show, and from episode six onwards, the show was retitled as simply The People's Quiz with the National Lottery draws moved to a separate live broadcast for the remainder of the series.

== Auditions ==
Auditions were held throughout January 2007 all around the UK.

The quiz was open to nearly everyone, in that the only excluded categories were:

- BBC Employees and their immediate families
- Under 16's
- Those with a criminal conviction in the last seven years
- Bankrupts or people with a County Court Judgement in the last five years

=== Round 1 ===
The first round of the audition consisted of contestants turning up at six major venues in the UK: Birmingham, Cardiff, Glasgow, Manchester, Belfast and London. Contenders had to get ten questions in a row correct to progress to the second round.

Contestants were allowed multiple attempts to qualify but organisational problems meant that this was not always possible at the earlier venues.

=== Round 2 ===
On the evening of 5 February 2007, all surviving contestants rang a phone line to receive a randomly selected 20 question quiz. The contestants were split into six categories based on age and sex. The top eight in each category qualified for the final audition round.

=== Round 3 ===
The 48 survivors turned up for what had been billed as a three-day quiz boot camp on 16 February 2007. The contestants were split into a male and female group and further subdivided into three age categories:

- Under 25s
- Over 40s
- Those in between

Each contestant was given a Mastermind style two-minute general knowledge round (interrupting the question master was allowed) and each contestant was then summoned back in front of the quiz panel to hear of their fate: four in each category went through and four did not.

=== Audition Controversies ===
The open auditions were clearly a very ambitious and time-consuming process and teething problems were inevitable. In particular a thread on the Quizzing.co.uk website has led to over 400 posts, many of them from disgruntled contestants.

Complaints ranged from long delays at the early auditions through to being effectively kept in solitary confinement at Pinewood Studios.

== Studio phase ==
=== Rules of the Game ===
Ten players competed in each show.

The first round was called "Only the Strong survive" and was played four times to find the four qualifiers for round two. Each time this game was played the competitors started with one life and were eliminated by getting a question wrong. At the end of the allotted time period – 2 minutes (or 90 seconds in the final show) – all the survivors got an "On the Buzzer" question. A correct answer qualified a player for round two. A wrong answer to the "On the Buzzer" question also eliminated the player and a new question must be asked.

The Second round was called "Brain Chain" where the four contestants who qualified from "Only the Strong survive" took turns to try to make a chain of questions in 90 seconds. Whoever made the longest saved chain went through to the head-to-head play-off called "Do or Die".

The winner of "Brain Chain" selected who s/he thinks would be the weakest competition out of the other nine for the final round. The winner qualified for The Grand Final, the loser was eliminated from the competition. There were 12 categories on the screen – five of them had a 'Q' hidden behind it and seven did not. The winner of "Brain Chain" started by picking a category, and then the fastest person to buzz in and get the answer right got to see if there was a 'Q' behind that category. If there was, the contestant got the Q and whoever got three Qs won and won their round and qualified for the final. The next week, the eight contestants from the start who didn't play in "Do or Die" were joined by two of the other survivors from the Final Audition Weekend.

=== Finalists ===
- Olav Bjortomt

He defeated Amanda 3–0 (6–0 on questions answered) on 21 April 2007.

- Mark Labbett

He defeated Danielle 3–0 (6–0 on questions answered) on 28 April 2007.

- Mick McCarthy

He defeated Ben Dali 3–2 (6–6 on questions answered) on 5 May 2007. With only one question left it was 2–2, and Mick buzzed in a fraction of a second before Ben, getting it right.

- David Buckle

He defeated Lucy 3–2 (9–3 on questions answered) on 19 May 2007. He answered 6 questions correctly before getting a Q. At the end, it was 2–2 and there was one category left. Lucy buzzed in and answered incorrectly, and David then got it right.

- Will Cudmore

He defeated Barbara 3–0 (5–1 on questions answered) on 26 May 2007.

- Stephanie Bruce

She defeated Martin 3–0 on 2 June 2007.

- Julia Hobbs

She defeated Carol 3–0 on 9 June 2007.

- Judith Searle

She defeated Cate 3–1 on 16 June 2007.

- Alan Morgan

He was the winner of the People's Quiz Wildcard series on BBC2, taking the last available place at the last available minute.

=== Final ===
In the Grand Final only Stephanie, Mark, Mick, and Will respectively qualified from "Only the Strong survive" and into "Brain Chain". Will and Mick both managed to save a chain of zero meaning Mark and Stephanie only needed one to qualify. Stephanie did just that, but Mark managed a score of six giving him an advantage into the final.

Mark and Stephanie went on to battle in the final "Do or Die" round of the series. Stephanie won with three 'Q's to Mark's one, taking home the £200,700 prize money. This was, and as of 2009 still is, the largest cash prize ever awarded on a BBC quiz or game show.

== Quizmasters ==
The quiz had three celebrities making up the Quiz Panel: William G. Stewart, Kate Garraway and Myleene Klass.

== International versions ==
Country/Region	Name	Host	Network	Questioneers	Premiere	Prize
(Arab League) Arab World	مسابقة الجماهير; Musabaqet El Jamahir	Ashraf Hamdi	MBC 1	George Kurdahi; Mona Zaki; Sarah El Dandarawi	11 January 2011	SR2,000,000
Belgium	Le Grand Quiz Des Belges	Jacques van den Biggelaar	RTL-TVI	Philippe Malherbe; Sabrina Jacobs; Julie Taton	13 January 2009	€100,000
France	Le Plus grand quiz de France	Sandrine Quétier	TF1	Jean-Pierre Foucault; Mareva Galanter; Christophe Dechavanne; Alexia Laroche-Joubert (Season 1)	6 November 2009	€250,000 + €10,000
Spain	El gran quiz	Nuria Roca	Cuatro	Marta Sánchez; Jaume Figueras; Carlos Blanco	16 April 2008	€400,000
Turkey	Bir milyon kimin	Pelin Çift	Show TV	Okan Bayülgen; Bülent Özveren; Gülben Ergen	September 2013	TR1,000,000
