= Fever Media =

Fever Media Ltd
- Industry: Television production
- Founded: 2006
- Headquarters: London
- Key people: David Mortimer, Richard Hopkins, Juliet Lomas, David Tibballs, Jack Burgess
- Website: http://www.fevermedia.co.uk

Fever Media Ltd was a British television production company based in London. It was launched in 2006 by former BBC Executive Producers Richard Hopkins and David Mortimer. It develops and produces quizzes, game shows, factual entertainment, factual formats, documentary, entertainment performance and music programming for the UK and International markets. Fever works closely with Sony Music on a number of artist and music-related projects, as well as creating formats to discover new musical talent.

== Productions ==
- 71 Degrees North, Series 1 and 2, ITV1 (2010, 2011)
- Remembrance Week, BBC One (2010, 2011)
- Bang Goes The House, Sky One (2011)
- Bums, Boobs and Botox, Channel 4 (2011)
- Dancing on Wheels, BBC Three (2010)
- Bill Bailey's Birdwatching Bonanza, Sky One (2010)
- Move Like Michael Jackson, BBC Three (2009)
- No Place Like Home, Series 1 and 2, ITV1(2007, 2009)
- Lifesavers, Five (2008)
- Britain's Bravest, Five (2008)
- Find Me The Face, BBC Three (2008)
- Murder Most Famous, BBC2 (2008)
- The People's Quiz Wildcard, BBC1 (2007)
- The People's Quiz, BBC1 (2007)
- Fortune: Million Pound Giveaway, ITV1 (2006)
