= Wheelchair dancesport =

Partner dance competition where at least one of the dancers is in a wheelchair

Wheelchair Dance
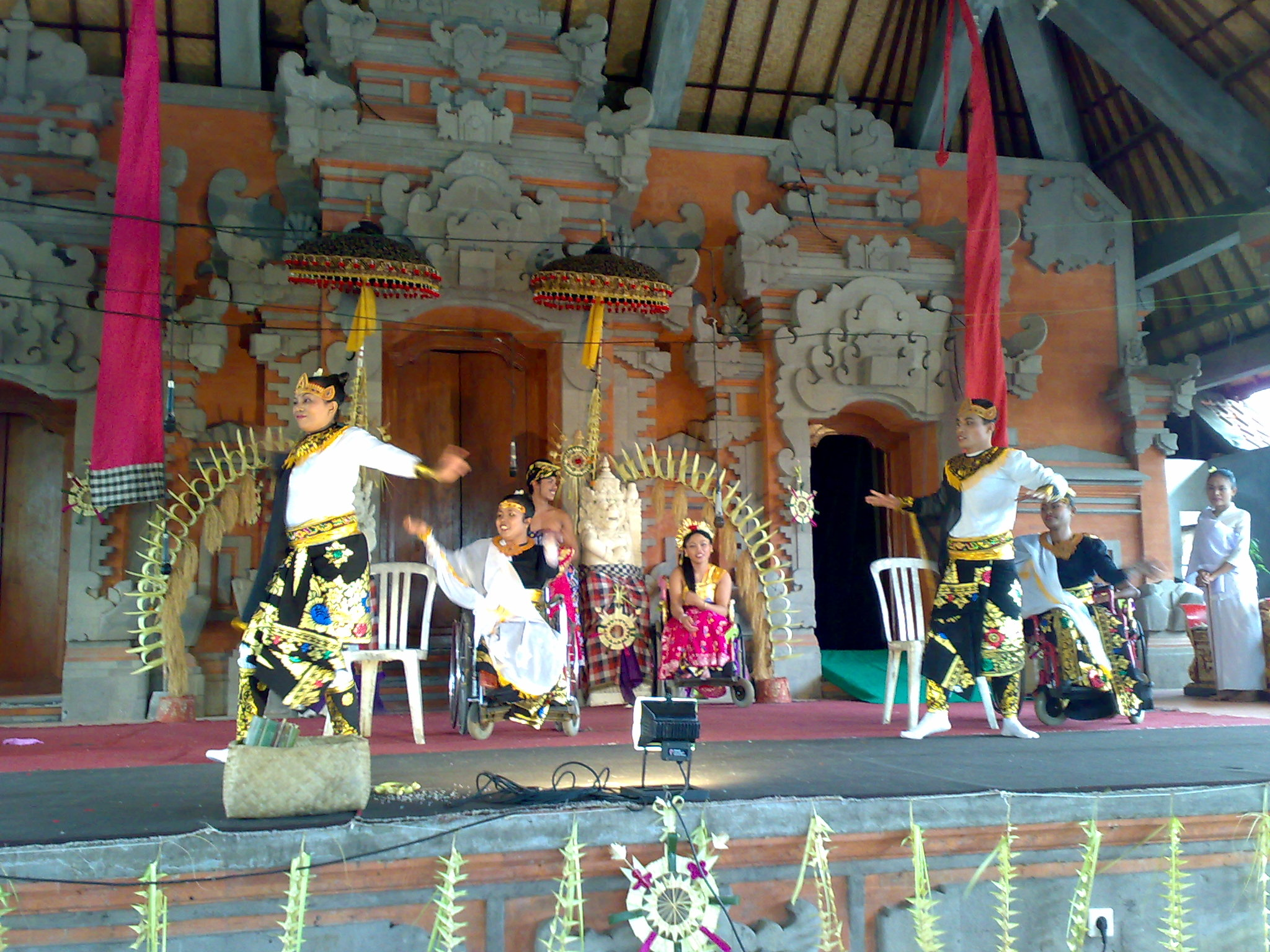
- Senang Hati-Diah Larasati-Wheelchair Dance
- Highest governing body: World Abilitysport
- First played: 1968 Sweden

Characteristics
- Contact: Yes
- Team members: Single competitors, doubles, or teams
- Mixed-sex: Yes
- Type: Indoor
- Equipment: Wheelchair
- Venue: Dance hall

Presence
- Country or region: Worldwide

Wheelchair dancesport, also known as Para dance sport, is a form of competitive dancesport where at least one of the dancers is in a wheelchair. The sport corporates the rules of the World DanceSport Federation (WDSF).

== Sport ==
Wheelchair couple dances are for two wheelchair users or for one wheelchair user with a "standing" partner and include standard dances such as waltz, tango, Viennese waltz, slow foxtrot and quickstep and Latin American dances such as samba, cha-cha-cha, rumba, paso doble and jive. There are also formation dances for four, six or eight dancers.

Wheelchair dancing started in Sweden in 1968, originally for recreation or rehabilitation, with the first competition held in 1975. The first international competition was also held in Sweden, in 1977. Several regional and international competitions followed and the first World Championship was held in Japan in 1998. From 1998 to 2024, Wheelchair dancesport was governed by World Para Dance Sport, a subcommittee of the International Paralympic Committee (IPC). As part of the rebranding of the IPC's governing subcommittees as World Para Sports, the IPC began to refer to the sport as "Para dance sport" in 2016. The rebranding was also part of an effort to "further grow participation in the sport beyond wheelchair users", such as governing dancesport events involving competitors with prosthetics.

In 2021, the IPC began the process of transferring the governance of its self-governed sports to third-parties. In January 2024, the IPC transferred governance of the sport to World Abilitysport (formerly IWAS).

Para dance sport was considered for inclusion in the 2024 Summer Paralympics, but the IPC did not select it for consideration, and ultimately chose against adding any new sports.

=== Classification ===
- Combi: dancing with an able-bodied (standing) partner
- Duo: dance for two wheelchair users together
- Formation: dances for four, six or eight couples dancing in formation

Athletes are placed into one of two classes:

- LWD 1: 14 points or less
- LWD 2: more than 14 points

=== World Para Dance Sport Championships ===
Edition	Year	Host City	Country	Events
1	1998	Nagano	Japan	
2	2000	Oslo	Norway	
3	2002	Warsaw	Poland	
4	2004	Tokyo	Japan	
5	2006	Arnhem	Netherlands	
6	2008	Minsk	Belarus	
7	2010	Hannover	Germany	
8	2013	Tokyo	Japan	
9	2015	Rome	Italy	
10	2017	Malle	Belgium	

=== European Para Dance Sport Championships ===
Edition	Year	Host City	Country	Events
1	1991	Munich	Germany	
2	1993	Oslo	Norway	
3	1995	Duisburg	Germany	
4	1997	Härnösand	Sweden	
5	1999	Athens	Greece	
6	2001	Arnhem	Netherlands	
7	2003	Minsk	Belarus	
9	2007	Warsaw	Poland	
10	2009	Tel Aviv	Israel	
11	2014	Łomianki	Poland	
12	2016	Kosice	Slovakia	

=== Asian Para Dance Sport Championships ===
Edition	Year	Host City	Country	Events
1	2016	New Taipei City	Chinese Taipei	

== Social ==
Wheelchair dancing is a popular social and recreational activity, with participants in over 40 countries. The physical benefits of wheelchair dancing include the maintenance of physical balance, flexibility, range of motion, coordination and improved respiratory control. The psychological effects of ballroom dancing are social interaction and the development of relationships. For social dancers, it is an opportunity to engage in a fun and a friendly event with others. For competitors, it assists in the development of fair play, sportsmanship and communication skills. Wheelchair dancing is an activity that integrates the wheelchair user and able-bodied person.

== Courses ==
In February, 2008 the University of Delaware Collegiate DanceWheels Program was created to instruct students in wheelchair dancing. This is the first accredited course of its kind in the United States. The program was developed in conjunction with the American DanceWheels Foundation through a grant from the Christopher and Dana Reeve Foundation.

== See also ==
- Physically integrated dance
- Dancing on Wheels (a British television show)
- Piotr Iwanicki
- Brian Fortuna
