= Britain's Missing Top Model =

2008 British television series

- Judges: Wayne Hemingway; Lara Masters; Marie O'Riordan; Mark Summers
- Narrated by: Joe Duttine
- Country of origin: United Kingdom
- No. of series: 1
- No. of episodes: 6

Production
- Running time: 60 minutes

Original release
- Network: BBC Three
- Release: 1 July – 30 July 2008

Britain's Missing Top Model is a British Reality TV modelling show for disabled women, aired on BBC Three. The premiere episode aired on 1 July 2008. The show courted controversy, with many arguing that the show made disability a spectator event.

The show followed eight young disabled women, who competed for a modelling contract (which included a photo shoot with Rankin and a cover photo in Marie Claire). One of the contestants, Sophie Morgan, had already appeared on another reality TV show, Beyond Boundaries, in 2005. The series aired over a period of five weeks. The women lived together and competed in a series of challenges and photo shoots. Each week, at least one contestant was sent home.

The winner of the competition was 23-year-old Kelly Knox.

== Episode guide ==
Promotional photograph of the cast of Britain's Missing Top Model

=== Episode 1 ===
Original Airdate: 1 July 2008

The eight women met up in the penthouse where they would be living. Jonathan Phang met them and gave them their first outfits: a white vest, shorts and trainers, simple hair and make-up, to show their shape. They met up with the judges and they were asked questions. They were told their first task was called "Objects of desire" – an haute couture shoot, which involved being photographed seated in a chaise longue with an object that represented how they feel about their disabilities. They went to a market to search for their objects.

- Debbie: Hand mirror – after her accident, she couldn't bear to look in mirrors, but now she is happy to look
- Jenny: Crucifix pendant – her faith in God helped her to recover from her accident, re-learning to speak and other activities
- Jessica: Make-up box – unsaid
- Kellie: Hand mirror – unsaid, but from the series, Kellie said she was teased as a child by other schoolchildren, being called ugly, making her not like her appearance. She has been Miss Deaf UK and competed for the Miss Deaf World title, meaning she now sees herself as beautiful and likes her appearance
- Kelly: Riding crop – unsaid, but from the series, Kelly said she was taught to be tough and not let anyone put her down, so she aptly chose a riding crop
- Lilli: Jewelled bracelet – unsaid
- Rebecca: Perfume bottle – unsaid
- Sophie: Cracked hand mirror (using a hammer to crack the mirror) – she was looking at the cracked rear-view mirror the moment she crashed and became a paraplegic

After the photoshoot, the girls lined up on Trafalgar Square and their photos were shown on a big screen for everyone to see. Sophie commented that this was why her accident happened; so she can do things like this.

After the photoshoot, the women returned home to find a buffet had been laid out for them. Jessica was questioned why she didn't drink. She replied that she wanted to always have control of her body. She then got emotional that her disability will ultimately kill her. The other women were sympathetic yet also apathetic about their own views on their own disabilities; Kelly said "I don't give a fucking shit!" about her missing forearm. Sophie didn't want to dwell on disability and wanted to enjoy the evening.

When the judges saw the pictures, they questioned Lilli about how she would cope being a model and being deaf. This angered her as they never asked personal questions regarding being deaf to Kellie, the only other deaf contestant.

- First Call-Out: Kellie Moody
- Bottom Two: Lilli Risner & Rebecca Le'gon
- Eliminated: Rebecca Le'gon, for not showing the right emotion in her face
- Featured Photographer: Christopher Sims
- Special Guests: Jonathan Phang (mentor), Melissa Richardson
- Other details: During showing the Wayne Hemingway and Lara Masters regretted their decision to eliminate her, but Mark Summers was happy with the decision.

=== Episode 2 ===
Original Airdate: 8 July 2008

The first task was to be a lingerie window model in a lingerie shop. The response was positive from the public. However, Sophie complained that Kellie, one of the deaf contestants, did not look disabled, that she had "big boobs, big arse, a body that's great," whereas she's a paraplegic and looks disabled. Jonathan Phang, their mentor, invited himself round to dinner, and purposefully did not bring a sign language interpreter, his reason being that Kellie and Lilli have to be able to cope without an interpreter if they were models, which upset them both.

The second task given was a casting challenge to win the opportunity to show Louis Mariette's hats at a fashion show. Each model was given one of Mariette's hats to pose in and was asked questions, like in a beauty pageant. Kellie won, which displeased Sophie as Kellie was able to pose in different positions and she couldn't pose as much, and using Kellie is not the same as using a disabled model as the only difference is language: "It's the same as picking someone who speaks French"

That night, they all went out to party, except Jessica who needed to sleep because of her myalgic encephalomyelitis.

The next morning, they were phoned by the casting location to be there in half an hour. This was to test their punctuality when they need to be at a casting call quickly. Debbie, Kelly, Sophie and Jenny all rushed ahead to get a taxi, leaving Jessica, Lilli and Kellie to get to the location themselves. Lilli and Kellie were annoyed that the others didn't take the time to explain what was happening, but Debbie was insistent that she was being clear. Jonathan Pang wasn't happy with their lack of cooperation. They each took it in turn to be interviewed by a casting director, and modelled an item of clothing.

A 1950s pin-up photoshoot followed, where the photos would be judged. The photoshoot was 1950s pin-up, the task that their photos would be judged by the judges. The scenarios of the models' photoshoots were as follows:

- Debbie: Lying on the floor, speaking on the phone, wearing a short white top and shorts, black stockings and white stilettos
- Jenny: Looking over her shoulder, wearing black lingerie, and fanning herself with a purple feather
- Jessica: Sitting on a puff, dressed as a sexy cowgirl
- Kellie: Standing beside a drape and cushions, dressed as a sexy maid, and holding a feather duster
- Kelly: Kneeling on a white cushion, wearing white lingerie, holding something red
- Lilli: Sitting on a stool, wearing naval-designed lingerie and a sailor's hat
- Sophie: Sitting beside a map and a box with a pilot's jacket laid on top, wearing red lingerie and a pilot hat

At the end of the day, when the women sat at the table, Kellie and Lilli brought earplugs for the others to help them understand what it's like to be deaf. They sat around and had to mouth their speech, which proved difficult for them to understand each other.

The judges announced that 2 people would be eliminated. The judges were presented with 1950s pin-up photos. When they met the judges, Lilli was upset yet again at their feedback – they told her she should tone up her belly.

- First Call-Out: Kellie Moody
- Bottom two: Lilli Risner and Debbie van der Putten
- Eliminated: Lilli Risner, for her untoned belly, and Debbie van der Putten, for her uncomfortable facial expression
- Featured photographer:
- Special guests: Louis Mariette, Jonathan Pang, Michelle Paradise
- Extra details: * Lilli said she was happy to go and didn't ever want to be part of the modelling world. Debbie was more optimistic, saying there will be plenty of opportunities for her.
- Rebecca Le'gon, eliminated in the first episode, returned to the 1950s pin-up photoshoot to take a photo with the rest of the contestants. Her outfit was a red silk top, cream waistcoat and a red feather in her hair, and black stockings.

=== Episode 3 ===
Original Airdate: 15 July 2008

This task was a catwalk. They met with a choreographer who taught them how to walk. He paid close attention to how to help Sophie move her wheelchair in a model-like fashion. Sophie got upset as she missed walking and dancing. It proved difficult for Jenny also as her ataxia makes it difficult to walk, let alone walk in stilettos. Jessica spent part of her time there asleep due to her ME. They were also given a selection of outfits that they would model on the catwalk. They were each given a new hairstyle as well. They were also given MP3 players with the music they would walk to, which had to be put on the loudest possible volume for Kellie, who's deaf, so she could feel the vibrations. Jenny also got upset as she found the catwalk difficult due to her ataxia making her body shake; "My body won't do what I tell it to do."

At the catwalk, the judges and Jonathan Phang (mentor) were in the audience, as well as family members and friends. Jenny wore flat shoes so she could walk easier. Kellie missed her cue as the director had forgotten about her and didn't let her know when to go. Afterwards, Jenny talked to Mark Summers, one of the judges, and jokingly grinded and flirted with him.

At the judging part, this was used against her and Mark asked her if that was appropriate behaviour towards him. Jenny apologised for her behaviour, but replied that she knows she is a flirty person. Jenny also said to Jessica that she couldn't do this. Jessica was understandably upset by this, but Sophie backed Jenny's comment by saying that Jenny wasn't niggling over her shoulder, but questioning whether it was possible for her because of her conditions as she needs sleep, which was proved at the training. Jessica replied that she is getting better. When the girls left so the judges could decide, Jenny exclaimed that Jessica was "a fucking child", and "she's not getting any better, she's faking it!"

- First Call-Out: Kelly Knox
- Bottom Two: Jessica Kellgren-Hayes & Jenny Johnston
- Eliminated: Jenny Johnston, for her behaviour towards Mark
- Featured Photographer:
- Special Guests:
- Extra details After Jenny had been eliminated, she said to the judges how embarrassed she was for being too sexual, but Wayne Hemingway went up to her saying "This is a shit industry" and she's better off without it. After Jenny left, Mark and Wayne argued about the decision and the words used by Mark, and Wayne threatened to leave

=== Episode 4 ===
Original Airdate: 22 July 2008

This task featured male models Daniel Lake, Tommy Maxwell, Matthew McDonough and Eric Monjoin. For the first part each contestant was paired up with a male model and had to hug and touch each other to get used to the closeness for the photoshoots. The second part was a challenge set by Alenka. The challenge was for each couple to star in an advert, advertising a fake brand ice cream, Pang's Ice cream (names after Jonathan Pang, their mentor). Kellie struggled the most as she was told to speak, when she was more comfortable signing. She argued that British Sign Language is her language and Sophie was allowed her wheelchair on the catwalk task, why shouldn't she be allowed to sign? By learning that models used in adverts are sometimes dubbed, she did two adverts – she spoke in one, and signed in the other. Jessica slept through most of the rehearsal due to her ME.

- 4th place: Kellie and Daniel Lake, due to Kellie's unwillingness to speak
- 3rd place: Kelly and Matthew McDonough, due to the long passionate kiss, which Alenka said was "too steamy for morning television," plus her Essex accent wasn't right for the advert
- 2nd place: Jessica and Eric Monjoin; their acting was best, but their childish behaviour when they came in was unacceptable
- 1st place: Sophie and Tommy Maxwell; Sophie choked on the ice cream on the first take, but Alenka felt their overall performance was best

The contestants and the male models returned to the penthouse where they were treated to a chocolate fountain. Jessica felt embarrassed about how Sophie and Kelly loudly pointed out she was a lesbian, which she felt was unnecessary. Kellie got upset that she wasn't following the conversation with the others and left.

At the photoshoot, the women were photographed with their partners in an old house. Sophie had to be carried by her partner up the stairs as there was no lift. The photographs are as follows:

- Jessica: laying on a bed with Matthew McDonough
- Kellie: standing in front of Daniel Lake
- Kelly: sitting on Eric Monjoin's lap
- Sophie: laying across Tommy Maxwell's lap

After the photoshoot, Phang treats them to eat at a posh restaurant. Jessica compares her disabilities to Kellie and Sophie's disabilities and lists the things she can't do, which is quickly pointed out by Sophie. Jessica explains that she needs to prove her disability to other people, to get help. Sophie doesn't like how Jessica desires to be labelled and to be recognised as disabled, which ends in Sophie telling her, "Stop feeling sorry for yourself!"

The judges commented on Kellie's picture that she looked uneasy and uncomfortable in her picture. They equally told Kelly that her appearance was cold.

- First Call-Out: Sophie Morgan
- Bottom Two: Jessica Kellgren-Hayes & Kellie Moody
- Eliminated: Kellie Moody, for her poor photo
- Featured Photographer: Anna Stephenson
- Special Guests: Alenka, Daniel Lake, Tommy Maxwell, Matthew McDonough, Eric Monjoin, Jeremy Stockwell
- Extra details: Kelly was upset that Kellie had gone and Jessica didn't deserve to stay. She also cried about Kellie's treatment in the ice cream task; Kellie was forced to speak when she couldn't, and Kelly queried, "How can you be someone that you're not?" This also reflected Phang's comment that looks cold in her pictures and needs to let down her guard.

=== Episode 5 ===
Original Airdate: 29 July 2008

The episode was split into 2 rounds. The first round was a photo shoot at an East London housing estate. The photographer made sure that their disabilities were hidden; Kelly was positioned so her missing forearm was hidden, Sophie was out of her wheelchair, and Jessica took off her wrist splints. The photos are as follows:

- Jessica: stood in front of a house with an umbrella and watering can in hand, wearing a green dress and purple stockings
- Kelly: sat on the grass, wearing a yellow dress
- Sophie: sat on the roof, wearing a pink dress, leopard print stockings and sunglasses

During the photoshoot, Kelly complained that there's nothing wrong with Jessica as she held the watering can with no problem. Jessica slept for some of the time due to her ME, but when she awoke, the zip from her jacket left an imprint on her face and needed make up to cover that.

In the evening, the girls accompanied Jonathan Phang at a ball, acting as ambassadors for the disabled modelling cause. Kelly didn't eat much and became drunk after Phang left. She leapt onto a bush and threw up. Sophie was unimpressed as they were acting as ambassadors and Kelly was not representing the cause well.

The judges looked at the photos. Lara Masters, who is a wheelchair user herself, was upset at how the photographer had hidden their disabilities, but the other judges dismissed her comment, stating that not all the photos have to show their disabilities. Mark Summers commented about Jessica holding the watering can. Without her wrist splints, Jessica's hands are paralysed, but she showed how her fingers naturally curled up and she was able to hold the watering can by her fingers. When she was asked how much sleep she needs (which had been an issue through the series) she replied that there is no telling when she needs to sleep.

- First Call-Out: Kelly Knox
- Bottom Two: Jessica Kellgren-Hayes & Sophie Morgan
- Eliminated: Jessica Kellgren-Hayes
- Featured Photographer: Amelia Troubridge

When Jessica was eliminated, she said she would 'rule the world' one day.

The final challenge was a monochrome nude photoshoot. Kelly let the photographer tell her what to do; which resulted in her photo being of her kneeling on a couch, just being made apparent that her forearm is missing. Sophie made suggestions of what she could do, and her photo was of her sitting on the floor with her foot on the wheel of her wheelchair.

- Final Two: Kelly Knox & Sophie Morgan
- Britain's Missing Top Model: Kelly Knox
- Featured Photographer: Oliver Pearce
- Special Guests:
- Extra details: After the winner was announced, Sophie was told that the decision was based on looks. Sophie got upset and angry when she lost, and left abruptly. She told Phang that Kelly wouldn't make changes to the industry.

=== Episode 6 ===
Original Airdate: 5 June 2008

In this episode, Kelly had a photo shoot with Rankin, and the photos were assessed by individuals from Marie Claire magazine. The episode also contained interviews with the 7 other contestants, recapping on their best and worst moments throughout the series.

== Contestants ==
(ages stated are at time of contest)

Contestant	Age	Hometown	Disablement(s)	Other Information	Rank
Rebecca Le'gon	27	Colchester, Essex, England	Leg amputee	Born without a left hip and a short left leg. She wears a prosthetic leg and uses a walking stick	8th
Lilli Risner	20	London, England	Deaf	Born deaf. Uses British Sign Language	7th/6th
Debbie van der Putten	22	Helmond, The Netherlands	Arm amputee	Lost her right arm in a bus accident	7th/6th
Jenny Johnston	22	Seattle, Washington, United States	Ataxia	Caused by a car accident in her teens. Wore a cast on her left arm (unrelated to her disability) throughout the series	5th
Kellie Moody	23	Leicester, Leicestershire, England	Deaf	Born deaf. Uses British Sign Language and speech	4th
Jessica Kellgren-Hayes	19	Bristol, England	Deaf, HNPP, MCTD, POTS, ME, blind in left eye, and no feeling left side of face.	Wears wrist splints and uses a wheelchair for long distances. Uses Sign Supported English and speech.	3rd
Sophie Morgan	23	Brighton, England	Paraplegic	Caused by a car accident in her teens	Runner-up
Kelly Knox	23	Enfield, Greater London, England	Missing forearm	Born missing a left forearm	Winner

== Summaries ==
=== Call-out Order ===
Mark's Call-out Order
Order	Episodes					
Order	1	2	3	4	5	
1	Kellie	Kellie	Kelly	Sophie	Kelly	Kelly
2	Jessica	Jessica	Kellie	Kelly	Sophie	Sophie
3	Kelly	Kelly	Sophie	Jessica	Jessica	
4	Debbie	Jenny	Jessica	Kellie		
5	Jenny	Sophie	Jenny			
6	Sophie	Debbie				
7	Lilli	Lilli				
8	Rebecca					

The contestant was eliminated
The contestant won the competition

- Kellie won a challenge in episode 2.
- Sophie won a challenge in episode 4.
- In episode 6, Kelly had one last shoot for having won the series. Additionally, past eliminated contestants were interviewed about their journey on the show.

=== Makeovers ===
The hair makeovers were administered by Lino Carbosiero at the Daniel Galvin Salon.

- Jenny: cut shorter with more blonde added
- Kellie: given a bang fringe
- Jessica: stylish bob cut, dyed red
- Sophie: trimmed and roots dyed blonde
- Kelly: cut shorter with side swooped fringe

== International broadcasts ==
- In the United States, this programme commenced airing on BBC America each Tuesday at 9pm E/P (8pm C) from 1 December 2009.
- In Australia, this programme started screening on ABC2 each Wednesday at 9:30pm from 2 March 2011.

== See also ==
- Britain & Ireland's Next Top Model
