= Move Like Michael Jackson =

- Developed by: BBC
- Presented by: Reggie Yates
- Judges: Jermaine Jackson; Jamelia; Mark Summers
- Country of origin: United Kingdom
- No. of series: 1
- No. of episodes: 6

Production
- Producer: Fever Media
- Camera setup: Multi-Camera
- Running time: Various lengths
- Production companies: Fever Media; Gogglebox Entertainment

Original release
- Network: BBC Three
- Release: 14 December – 21 December 2009

Move Like Michael Jackson is a British talent show made by independent production company Fever Media and Gogglebox Entertainment and broadcast on BBC Three. It aimed to find people who can dance like the pop singer Michael Jackson. The show aired months after Jackson's death in June 2009. Presented by television personality Reggie Yates, the programme broadcast the auditions of hopefuls as they perform in front of the show's judges: Mark Summers, contemporary R&B singer Jamelia, and Jackson's elder brother and former Jackson 5 band member Jermaine.

== Background and production ==
Entertainer Michael Jackson died in June 2009, in his home in Los Angeles, California. He was regarded as one of the greatest dancers of the 20th century, and popularized several dance moves, including the moonwalk and robot. Jackson adapted choreography from figures such as Michael Peters and Jeffrey Daniel and used them his music videos.

In creating the six-part series, the producers stated that they were aiming to find individuals "with the showmanship and technical ability of [Jackson]". Jermaine Jackson was drafted to judge the show, and said of his younger sibling at the time of production, "[He] inspired people across the world to master his moves and create their own unique routines." He added that he was "really excited and delighted" to be a part of the series and looked forward "to finding the UK's most talented and inspiring dancers".

Auditions for the talent show were held in October and were open to any persons aged 16 and over. The Move Like Michael Jackson participants had to learn Jackson's signature dance move, the moonwalk, as well as create new Jackson-inspired dance steps for the series. Karl Warner, executive producer for BBC Entertainment Commissioning, said that the show's production staff wanted to "hear from anyone who's ever been inspired by the moonwalk, the Smooth Criminal lean or the crotch grab and find out if they can move like Michael Jackson."
