= Kelly Knox =

British fashion model (born 1984)

- Born: 1984 (age 41–42); Enfield, London, England
- Occupation: Fashion model
- Years active: 2008–present
- Known for: Britain's Missing Top Model winner
- Modelling information
- Height: 5 ft 8 in (1.73 m)
- Hair colour: Blonde
- Eye colour: Blue
- Website: kellyknox.com

Kelly Knox (born 1984) is a British fashion model. She has been voted one of the most influential disabled people in the UK, and is one of the few fashion models in the world with a physical disability. In 2017, Knox became one of the first models with a disability to star at London Fashion Week.

== Early life ==
Kelly Knox was born in Enfield, North London and raised in both Enfield and Poplar, East London. She was born without a left forearm but, from the age of seven, refused to wear a prosthetic arm and since then has never used a prosthesis.

== Career ==
In 2008, she was the winner of the BBC Three Reality TV show, Britain's Missing Top Model. One of eight disabled women contestants, among her competitors were two deaf women, a wheelchair user and a woman with one leg. As the winner of Britain's Missing Top Model, she won a photoshoot with top fashion photographer, Rankin, and a feature in Marie Claire magazine. Unlike Britain's Next Top Model, a modelling contract was not part of the prize, but she was offered an introduction to Take 2 Models (London) who signed her after the show but shortly after went into administration. She has since been signed to a number of modelling agencies.

In August 2023, Knox was signed to Base Models agency.

== Television ==
Knox has featured in two series of Gok Wan's How to Look Good Naked television series. She has also appeared on television in Celebrity Ready Steady Cook with Jonathan Phang, and has modelled and been interviewed on This Morning and BBC Breakfast.

In 2013, she starred as a lead actress in the second series of Channel 4's hidden camera series I'm Spazticus, that seeks to change perceptions of disabilities.

In 2020, she appeared as a celebrity judge on the second episode of Sky TV's Rankin's 2020, in his search for the best photographers, capturing the spirit of that year in pictures taken by members of the public.

== Modelling ==
She has modelled in catwalk shows such as London Fashion Week and in September 2016, she walked on Carrie Hammer's runway as part of New York Fashion Week., and walked in the 'Trends for 2013 Fashion Show' for Procter & Gamble Beauty 'Vision House' in Beijing. She has featured in advertising campaigns for VO5 and Samsung. Knox continued to break fashion barriers in 'Tenk Nytt' or 'Think New' advertising campaign for Oslo City.

In April 2013, it was announced that Knox would feature in the latest campaign for high-street store Debenhams, the first high street chain to use disabled models in its campaigns. Knox's photo was featured in British Vogue magazine in April 2013. The imagery supposedly "celebrates diversity in the retail sector".

Magazines include: Marie Claire UK (2008), a cover for Diva (2010) and Marie Claire China (2013). Knox was interviewed for Australian disability magazine Link, for their October 2014 issue. Knox featured in Fabulous Magazine, Feb 2016. She has appeared twice on the cover of Grazia magazine, in 2020 and in 2018.

She has worked in the UK, United States, Germany, China, Norway and Pakistan.

Knox shot for exclusive Parisian Fashion brand Yperlab in October 2014.

In 2018, Knox fronted a modelling campaign for Primark. In 2021, she fronted Asda's new maternity campaign.

== Campaign Work ==
In 2008, Knox launched a charity auction of celebrity shoes to raise money for landmine victims in aid of the Mines Advisory Group. She also worked with youth and education charity Raleigh. In 2013, Knox became an ambassador for Reach Charity, the association for children with upper limb deficiency.

In 2013, Knox presented a short video for United Response creative disability project 'Postcards from the Edges', to encourage other people affected by disability to create a postcard of their own to express what is important to them.

As part of the London College of Fashion's Better Lives Seminar on 10 March 2014, she spoke about "Ableism in Fashion".

On three occasions (2014, 2016 and 2017), Knox was voted one of the top 100 most influential people with a disability by the Shaw Trust and listed in the Power 100.

A decade after she won Britain's Missing Top Model she featured in an article for the BBC about why disabled models continue to be excluded from the mainstream.

In early 2016 she co-founded the Diversity Not Disability campaign to promote equal opportunities for models with disabilities.

In 2016 Knox was shortlisted for Celebrity of The Year at The National Diversity Awards.

Knox was interviewed by Lou Stoppard at Nick Knight's Showstudio.com as part of their Prosthetics: Conversations, talking about the fashion industry's treatment of diverse bodies and her decision not to wear a prosthetic arm.

Knox is an ambassador (2016) for Parallel London and Disability Confident. In 2018, she was invited to give a TED (conference) talk in Glasgow.
