= Scott Mills (radio show) =

BBC radio programme

- Genre: Entertainment, comedy and music
- Running time: 150 minutes (2020–2022); 240 minutes (2020); 180 minutes (2012–2020); 165 minutes (2004–2012)
- Country of origin: United Kingdom
- Language: English
- Home station: BBC Radio 1
- Hosted by: Scott Mills and Chris Stark (co-presenter)
- Produced by: Amy Johnson
- Recording studio: Studio 82Mills, Broadcasting House, London
- Original release: 7 June 2004 – 25 August 2022
- Audio format: present Stereo
- Website: BBC Homepage
- Podcast: Scott Mills Daily

Scott Mills was a British radio show broadcast on BBC Radio 1 from 2004 to 2022. It was hosted by Scott Mills, with contributions from Chris Stark. Other contributors have included Mark Chapman, Laura Sayers, and Beccy Huxtable, the last of whom left the show in 2013.

== History ==
Scott Mills joined Radio 1 on 12 October 1998, hosting the early breakfast show between 4–6:30am. On his fourth day on the job, he was asked to substitute for Zoe Ball on the Radio 1 Breakfast Show at the last minute, and he remained the regular cover host for many years thereafter, continuing for Sara Cox, Chris Moyles, Nick Grimshaw and Greg James. In January 2004, he was moved from early breakfast to the 1-3pm slot at weekends. In May 2004 Mills returned to weekday-afternoon programming as a temporary replacement for Cox, who was on maternity leave. When Cox decided not to return to afternoons Mills became permanent host in the drive-time slot with Cox's former co-host, Mark "Chappers" Chapman. The show originally aired from 3–5:45pm, moving to a later 4–7pm slot in a schedule reorganisation later in 2004. Mills remained here, with producer Emlynn Dodd until March 2012.

On 25 July 2008, a special edition of the show was broadcast live from Barry Island in South Wales as part of Radio 1's summer events. The special broadcast was dedicated to a regular feature on the show (called "Barryoke"), during which listeners named Barry ring in to cover a song and change the lyrics to include their name. Barry Chuckle of the Chuckle Brothers recorded a special edition of "Barryoke" for the Barry Island show, changing the lyrics of Jay-Z's "99 Problems" from "I got 99 problems but a bitch ain't one" to "I got 99 problems but a Barry ain't one".

On 28 February 2012 it was announced that Mills would be moved to the 1–4pm time slot, with Greg James replacing him in the drivetime show from 2 April.

For Christmas 2012, Mills and team set themselves a challenge to make the perfect Christmas single, one that would stand the test of time and still be good in 20 years. He enlisted the help of Frisky & Mannish, as well as Chris and Beccy, and created "Scott Mills & His Pigs in Blankets—The Perfect Christmas Single (Frankinsensational)", which is available as a free download on the Radio 1 website. It has been downloaded more than 170,000 times. There was also a BBC Radio 1's Stories documentary made about the making of the song.

Beginning January 2013, the Official Chart Update was incorporated into Mills' Wednesday show, running from 3:30 to 4 pm. This was initially cohosted with Jameela Jamil, and then Clara Amfo. Following the move of the chart to Fridays in June 2015, The Official Chart Update moved to air on Mondays at 4pm during Nick Grimshaw's drivetime show (4pm–7pm).

In May 2014, Scott decided he wanted to get involved in the 2014 FIFA World Cup by making a football song better than the official World Cup song by Pitbull, Jennifer Lopez and Claudia Leitte. To do this, he enlisted the help of Australian pop rock band 5 Seconds of Summer, and Scott performed a rap on the song. "Hearts Upon Our Sleeve (Feat. Scott Mills)" premiered on Monday 2 June 2014, and was available for a short time as a free download at the Radio 1 website. The song gained airplay abroad, in both Australia and the United States of America, albeit without recognition for Mills. Former co-host and sports reader Chappers returned on 30 May 2014 under the guise of "90s music expert" to judge Scott's single, and promote the 2014 FIFA World Cup coverage on the BBC.

On 14–15 March 2017, Mills and Stark took part in a 24 Hour LOLathon for Comic Relief. This 24-hour broadcast, which began on Tuesday 14 March at 4pm (after Scott's regular show aired from 1-4pm) involved Scott and Chris staying on air for 24 hours, and had to tell a specified number of jokes in each link. They were joined by the regular host of each show and a number of other guests including Russell Brand, Harry Hill and Russell Kane. In total, this raised £275,263.

Following changes to Radio 1's weekend schedule in March 2018, Maya Jama joined the team as a regular guest co-host on Fridays for a short period. From June 2018, the show only runs 4 days a week (Monday to Thursday) while Scott Mills hosts the official chart on Friday (4–7pm).

On 30 March 2020, the show (and Clara Amfo's show) was temporarily changed to 11am – 3pm for the indefinite future due to the COVID-19 pandemic. The decision was made to reduce the number of people in the Radio 1 Studios. The new show schedule included a 15-minute break at 12:45pm for Newsbeat. Chris Stark consequently co- hosted from his home. During late March to early April, Scott Mills and Chris Stark took over the Radio 1 Breakfast Show whilst regular host Greg James was on holiday (at home). For the first two weeks of July 2020, the pair also once again covered for Greg James. Scott and Chris covered Nick Grimshaw's Drivetime show whilst he was on holiday (at home) in early June.

As of September 2020, the show reverted to its normal timeslot at 1:00pm but had the final half-hour cut, meaning Grimmy's drivetime show starts at 3:30pm. This is part of Radio 1's commitment to continue supporting new music, with Annie Mac's Future Sounds moving forward to 6:00pm and Jack Saunders' new Future Artists starting at 10:00pm.

On a Friday, to make up for the lack of a show, a podcast called "The Scott Mills Daily: Gold" is released containing some classic moments from the shows history. Previous editions have been centered around "Transfer Deadline Day" which involved people breaking up with their partners before Valentines Day and "The Old Lady" in which Mills dresses up as an old lady.

From 2021 to 2022, Mills was the regular cover for Ken Bruce on BBC Radio 2 and so, in these instances, presented that show from 9:30am to midday, before being heard again on the BBC an hour later, in his normal Radio 1 slot.

On 1 July 2022, it was announced that Mills and Stark would leave Radio 1, bringing an end to "Scott Mills" on the station after 24 years. It was announced that Mills would be moving to replace Steve Wright in the afternoon slot on Radio 2, although Wright continued to present for the station until his death in February 2024. Stark left the BBC completely to become part of the Capital Breakfast Show on the station, though returned to present the Radio 2 Breakfast Show in February 2025.

The final "Scott Mills" show on Radio 1 aired on 25 August 2022. The final song played on the show was "Night Changes" by One Direction.

== Format ==
The show contained a mix of music, talk and features. Scott and Chris shared stories from their lives, prompting responses from listeners on text, Twitter and on the phone, with Scott often talking to listeners with similar experiences. Often listeners themselves would share their own stories and dilemmas prompting further discussion – a large portion of the show was listener-generated. Sometimes strange experiences would lead to Scott or Chris going out to investigate, and pulling some stunt that was played out on air. They also discussed amusing or strange things they have seen, which often became a theme in future shows, "a thing". Prank phone calls were also a staple of the show, as were games with other Radio 1 presenters. As of late 2017, the last half-hour of the show from 3:30 was dedicated to new pop music and Radio 1's Greatest Hits, with minimal talking from Mills and Stark. The show in general did become noticeably more music-heavy over the years, especially from 2017 onwards.

The show regularly topped the Audience Appreciation Index, which ranks the most popular shows on Radio 1. Mills is also on the Popjustice Readers Poll as being the Best DJ on the Radio, coming fourth in 2014, first in 2013, first in 2012, first in 2011, first in 2010, and first in 2008.

== Team ==
The show largely follows a zoo format, featuring regular contributor Chris Stark. Stark was originally introduced as Scott's friend, and began to appear regularly in 2011 with features such as 24 Years at the Tap End. He became a permanent team member in April 2012.

Maya Jama was part of the team on Fridays from 23 February 2018 to 15 June 2018, leaving when the show was replaced by The Official Chart on Fridays.

The show was previously produced by Emlyn Dodd (known as "The One That Doesn't Speak" due to his non-vocal role on the show). Dodd previously worked for Top of the Pops, The Official Chart and The Radio 1 Breakfast Show with Zoe Ball and Sara Cox. It was announced in January 2013 that Dodd was to leave the show and the BBC in February 2013. His final show aired on 22 February 2013.

Previous contributors include sports reader Mark Chapman (known as "Chappers"), who had worked with previous occupant of the drivetime slot Sara Cox before joining Mills as a team member. He became famous for his Annual Wimbledon Men's Semis joke, which still happens on the day of the Men's Semis even after his departure. Chapman left the show and the station on Christmas Eve 2009 to pursue work with BBC Sport. on Friday, 30 May 2014, for a guest appearance as a "90s Music Expert" and to advertise the World Cup on the BBC.

Laura Sayers was the broadcast assistant, and then assistant producer of the show from 2004 to 2008, and was responsible for features such as "Laura's Diary" and "One Night with Laura".

Mills was also joined by assistant producer Beccy Huxtable. She became a vocal part of the team, participating in games and features such as Beccy's Classifieds and What's Beccy's Forte?. She replaced original assistant producer Laura Sayers. Beccy left the show on 18 January 2013, after being diagnosed with MS; however, she was still referenced and occasionally made on-air appearances in the months following her departure.

In February 2013, as a result of Dodd and Huxtable's departures, a change in the production team ensued. Cara O'Brien took up the post of Producer and Chris Sawyer took up the Assistant Producer role. Sawyer also read out the 'Real or No Real' facts when Chris Smith was unavailable. O'Brien and Sawyer occasionally contribute on air, but are usually just referenced by Scott and heard in the background. O'Brien left her role on the show in 2014 and was replaced by Will Foster. Foster now works on the Radio 1 Breakfast Show and Will Wilkin now produces the show.

Other former contributors include 'The Posh Radio 4 Lady' (Kathy Clugston), who reads listeners' emails in Dear Scott, and Greg James, Charlie Sloth, Alice Levine and Danny Howard who come in to play 'Real or No Real'.

== Features ==
Recurring features on the programme included:

- Brother or Lover— In this notoriously difficult game, Scott and Chris get two people on and try to guess of they are siblings or "having it off." They ask questions such as "Have you ever shared a bedroom?" and "Have you ever went on holiday together?". Letchy Leila often asks a rather risqué, usually job related, question to attempt to ascertain the two peoples situation. Examples of this include "has the engineer brother or lover ever inspected your pipes?"
- Bamboléo Wednesday—On Wednesdays, Scott will play a section from the Gipsy Kings song Bamboléo to help listeners get over the "hump day", whilst Chris sings along out of tune. It originated from a Real or No Real fact in January 2014. The boys also play clips popular clips from the show. There is also a "gap" before the first chorus, in which show highlights and other entertaining clips are played.
- Bangers—Scott and Chris both choose a song to play and listeners call in and one listener chooses between the songs usually at 2:40 pm.
- Don't Look It Up - a game in which you shouldn't use the internet to look for answers, but use your brain. Scott and Chris compete each other, with producer Amy Johnson adjudicating their scores. This was introduced when the Covid 19 pandemic hit the UK and was based on the Quiz Craze which people across the UK participated in.
- Granny Tinder - Zofia, who sometimes works on the show, invites her Gran to go through her Tinder profile live on air - allowing her to swipe potential matches right, or to bin them off. This feature has introduced a segment in which Granny Tinder gives advice to a listener.
- The WHOOO Game—A game piloted on 3 March 2014 and invented by listener Joe, where Scott and multiple callers take turns to list things that can be considered "WHOOO"s, until one person runs out. This is usually played on Mondays.
- Where do you think they were? A listener finds out from their parent where, when and how they were made in detail. In September 2019 the boys announced that everyone that takes part will get a sticker with a picture of an egg and sperm on that says 'I found out where I was conceived live on Radio 1'.

During the programme, "Scott Mills Points" were awarded by Mills to those who contacted the show (by telephone, SMS or Twitter) with an amusing, helpful or positive response. Scott Mills points came into existence in 2010, although they are now rarely referenced.

There are also many running gags made by Scott and Chris, including shouting "WHOOOOOOOOOOOOOOOOOOOOO" when an out of target or old fashioned reference is made (a take on an old Mark and Lard catchphrase), and saying "Hello (name), its nice to see you sober" as a greeting, quoting the infamous turkey episode of Family Fortunes where host Max Bygraves greets contestant Bob Johnson in that way. Scott will also say "Love you bye!" to all callers to the show, often prompting an awkward response, or more often, the caller declaring their love back. Other former catchphrases include "Alright treacle", "Oy oy saveloy!" and "Its only bley Friday!".

=== Former features ===
View from "Scott Cam" of Mills presenting the show in his living room

- Running out of music—A feature played occasionally that is based on Chris' theory that there are a finite combination of notes that can be used to make songs and therefore at some point the world will run out of new music. To illustrate this, Chris plays a selection of recent songs to Scott and compares them to older songs that sound similar.
- Ghostbusters—Scott invites listeners who have been "ghosted" to get in touch, and share their experience. Scott or Chris will then attempt to contact the "ghost" (person who ghosted the listener) and obtain an explanation for their sudden disappearance. Often, ghosts are unwilling to appear on-air although some offer explanations.
- James the PI—James, a real life private investigator originally phoned the show to share some stories about his line of work. He is now the show's official PI and at one point appeared every Thursday (formerly Friday) to tell a story about a job, usually with a particular theme.
- The Google Game—Scott, Chris and a guest (usually a fellow Radio 1 DJ) will be given a prompt consisting of the first few words of a question commonly searched on Google. They must then work together to complete the sentence to guess what the most popular searches are, often revealing things about themselves in the process.
- Flirt Divert—Mills provides a phone number for men on blind dates with homely women. Their calls went to the Flirt Divert answer phone, and Mills played them on the air.
- One Night with Laura—In 2006 Mills launched "One Night With Laura", a competition to find Laura (then assistant producer of the show) a boyfriend. The show went on the road with a tour bus, and held auditions in five UK cities to find Laura a date. Auditions in each city involved 20 single men, who were picked from thousands of entries. Judges for the auditions included Laura's father and sister; the "One Night with Laura" website drew 11.8 million hits.
- Scott Cam—On 29 September 2008, "Scott Cam" was launched. Mills had six cameras (on from 6 am to 11 pm; around the clock in the kitchen) placed in various rooms of his house for one week, with the show broadcast live from his house. The cameras were viewable by going to the Radio 1 website. "Scott Cam" was launched after the success of "Beccy Cam" (a live streaming webcam on the Radio 1 office desk).
- Innuendo Bingo—A game that involves playing clips from other radio or TV programmes (particularly other BBC programmes), where what is said can be misconstrued as innuendo. A celebrity guest or BBC personality takes a drink of water and holds it in their mouth as the clips are played; the goal is to get that person to laugh hard enough to spit the water across the studio. Chris frequently takes part in the game as well, sitting directly across from the guest with his own mouthful of water. Celebrities that have played this game have included Hugh Jackman, Will Ferrell, Gerard Butler, Daniel Radcliffe, Lewis Capaldi, Olly Murs, Zayn Malik, Jack Whitehall, Peter Crouch, Freddie Flintoff, Jessie J, Pixie Lott, Frankie Bridge, Joel Corry, Ella Henderson, Becky Hill and Jonas Blue along with other Radio 1 presenters such as Greg James, Mollie King, Danny Howard and Matt Edmondson. This is played on Tuesdays and Thursdays at 1:45pm. From September 2017 – February 2019, Innuendo Bingo was on hiatus (a previous hiatus had occurred from January – April 2016), however on 6 February 2019, the game returned with Davina McCall as the celebrity guest. The final edition aired on 12 November 2020, due to the feature being complicated by COVID-19.
- The Take Away Game—Resembles many prank call games. This involves two take-away stores; Mills rang one, ordered food from its menu and put it on hold. He then rang the second take-away store; before he gave his order he asked the first take-away store to repeat his order. It was repeated to the second take-away store, with the expected confusion.
- The Florist Game—A florist (normally foreign) was rung up, apparently to buy flowers; however, the real intention was to write a message which was actually a song (normally hip-hop or rap). Mills tried to get the florist to repeat the message, which was later played over the real song.
- The Great American Name Game—Finding humorous names in American telephone directories, with the objective of getting the callees to say their name
- The Library Book Game—Involved ringing a library and enquiring about the existence of a (fake) book and author, the combination of which is a double-entendre.
- The Honesty Game—a feature in which Mills, Chapman and Beccy answered questions from the public as truthfully as possible. This game occasionally included a guest (normally another Radio 1 DJ—such as Huw Stephens or Zane Lowe—or BBC Radio 5 Live presenter Colin Murray).
- The Wonder Years—Scott Mills would play 20 or so song in year by year order. This was dropped from the show after Scott Mills and Greg James swapped time slots.
- Livestock Lounge—Involved live animals that must be identified while blindfolded, and was performed in the Live Lounge. Chapman conducted the first segment (on 20 April 2007), which included a rabbit, a duck, a lamb and a snake. The second segment, on 20 December 2007, involved Chapman identifying a turkey, a ferret and a toy singing goat. Mills revived the feature (renamed "Livestock Lounge Extreme") on 9 April 2009 with a python, a squirrel monkey and a warm-weather penguin.
- Phonebook Roulette—Involved writing a text message on a mobile phone and sending the message to a random person by scrolling through the phone book. The message was usually curious or had mild innuendo, enticing the recipient to text back with an inquiry.
- Beccy's Classifieds—Beccy found strange (or interesting) online classifieds, then had Radio 1 announcers read them. On 7 August 2008, the only classified they purchased was an empty jar purported to contain the ghost of George Harrison. Missed connection advertisements became a part of more-recent features.
- What's Beccy's Forte?—Beginning on 28 May 2009, it involved Beccy trying to find something at which she excelled. The first segment featured UK beatboxer Beardyman. Cheerleading, mind-reading, tennis, interviewing celebrities and escapology were also unsuccessfully attempted.
- Just for the pun of it—Beccy and Mills phoned specialist shops, trying to slip into the call as many puns related to the profession as they can. Phone calls included a cheese shop, a pet shop and a French restaurant.
- Coxipedia—First heard in September 2010, Sara Cox talked for a minute about a listener's chosen subject. The feature aimed to have more entries in Coxipedia than Wikipedia by 2011; listeners applied to have their idea featured on the radio 1 website.
- Scott Mills: The Musical—Performed at the Pleasance One Theatre at the Edinburgh Festival Fringe from 11 to 13 August 2009, listeners supplied ideas for the musical due to its lack of stage material. The team requested audition videos for the role of Mills; the finalists were Adam from Southampton, Joe from Gloucestershire and Luke from Merseyside. The phone lines were opened early on Friday, 17 July for listeners' votes; Joe was declared the winner that afternoon.
- Laura's Diary—Former assistant-producer Laura had her teenage diary read by her younger sister, Mary (including stories of her first love, Ben, and difficult times at university).
- Treadmill Trivia—Quiz-based feature involving a treadmill and a contestant. For every question answered incorrectly, the treadmill's speed increases (usually to the point where the contestant falls off, to comic effect).
- It's Only Bleyyyy Friday!—Every Friday Mills shouted "It's Only Bleyyyy Friday!" in a nearly-incoherent voice, usually over classical music; the segment was dropped when the show's time slot changed.
- Who's That Tweeting?—A celebrity's tweet is read, and participants must guess its origin.
- Oh What's Occurring?—Long-running daily feature (after Chapman left the show on 24 December 2009), in which Mills records three situations in which Becky and a pre-selected listener guess the outcome of a situation. The caller challenges Becky; if they win, they stay on for another game. If they lose, a new caller appears the next time. The rules are flexible, with Mills changing them at will. The feature was retired in July 2010, but revived in April 2012 when the show moved to its new time slot. The feature went on hiatus again in November 2012, being replaced by Real or No Real.
- Scott Talks To Men in the Toilet—Scott sends Chris to the toilets in a nearby pub or at the BBC. Scott would talk into Chris' ear and tell him to ask questions of men in other toilet cubicles.
- 24 Years At The Tap End—an autobiography of contributor Chris Stark that ended in 2013 apart from specials.
- Fish Pie Sue—A contact in your phone that you have no memory about. Maybe some one you met on a night out and had a memorable feature about them that (at the time) you thought would trigger your memory the following morning. Scott get people to phone their Fish Pie Sue back to find out who they really are.
- Loving the Trolls—A segment where Mills read out abusive tweets and Facebook messages through the voice of Laurence, the automated speech system. This was revived whilst covering The Radio 1 Breakfast Show in April 2014, and was done with Lily Allen.
- The Speech Jammer—A Radio 1 personality would come in and try to call someone they know, but hear their voice on a small delay whilst doing so, making them slur their speech and giving the impression to the person on the other end of the phone that they are drunk.
- The Freshers Line—An answer phone line was set up during Freshers Week 2013, where freshers could call up to check in with Scott and make sure they were still listening. The best calls were played out on air, and often consisted of Freshers during nights out.
- Lisa and Steve—In September 2013, after Scott and Chris discussed two friends who tried dating for 40 days as an experiment, listener Lisa called up, who wanted to try it with her friend Steve. This resulted in Chris calling up Steve to ask him out on Lisa's behalf, and them trying dating for a week, calling in each day to report on the previous nights date. Chris wrote a theme tune for this feature, and in the final edition, they decided they would remain friends and not continue dating.
- Chris Stark: Plan B—Occasional feature during 2013. Stark gets invited by listeners to take part in activities where one member of their friendship group is unable to attend, as their Plan B. Plan Bs included playing Call of Duty at a listener's house and co piloting a Boeing 747 simulator.
- Follow Me, Follow You. Who Follows Who?—A feature where Chris Stark guesses whether particularly likely celebrity pairings actually follow one-another on Twitter.
- Dear Scott—A long-running feature in which listeners have their e-mails, texts and letters read by Kathy Clugston (also known as 'The Posh Radio 4 Lady' or 'PR4L'). Questions are answered on-air. This feature last aired in 2013.
- The Homes Under the Hammer Game—Scott and Chris hear clips from TV show Homes Under the Hammer, and try to guess what song will be played in the background from what they are saying.
- Real or No Real—A feature in which Newsbeat newsreader Chris Smith reads out a statement which could be true or completely fabricated. Stark and another Radio 1 personality (or occasionally Mills) then decide whether the facts are real or fake ("real" or "no real" respectively), for 10 "Scott Mills Points". This game hasn't been played since mid-2017, with 30 minutes of continuous music taking its place.
- Who's That Tweeting?—Tweets from a "famous's" Twitter account are read out by "The Voice of the Tweets" (a member of Radio 1 staff), and Mills and Stark must guess who tweeted them.
- The Instagram Game—Descriptions of photos posted on Instagram are read out by "The Voice of Instagram", and Mills and Stark must guess who posted them, in a similar format to "Who's That Tweeting?".

== Controversy ==
BBC Radio 1 was criticised by Ofcom in 2006 for what they said was "serious misjudgement" over a prank call on the programme. The regulator said that the call was "overtly aggressive" and "clearly unsuitable for broadcast". The woman who was the recipient of the call was told to "shut the fuck up", and her child called a "little shit" (although those words were bleeped out when the call was played on-air).

In 2008, Ofcom and the BBC received complaints about "Badly Bleeped TV", a feature where words were bleeped from TV or radio clips and the co-presenters are asked to guess what they are. Ofcom ruled this a breach of broadcasting regulations, and the feature was dropped from the show. It returned upon the show's move to the early-afternoon time slot as part of "Oh, What's Occurring".

== Podcast ==
In February 2006, a daily podcast of the show, Scott Mills Daily, became available for download from the BBC as part of its downloads trial. The podcast varies in length, depending on the amount of suitable material from the show available each day, but is usually around 30 minutes long. The podcast used to be around 40 minutes long, but due to Mills playing an increased amount of music, the length of the podcasts has decreased.

It is intended to contain the highlights of the programme (usually features, guests and talk). Due to copyright issues, the podcast does not contain music played on the show. A comprehensive archive of these podcasts are available on the Unofficial Mills podcast archive. Scott Mills Daily has done well in the UK iTunes Store chart (#13 in most-downloaded podcasts). Early figures from the BBC had shown it had been downloaded 330,471 times; during a week in December 2006, The Sun reported that Scott Mills Daily had been downloaded 535,051 times. In October 2014, the BBC announced that The Scott Mills Daily has been downloaded 53.4 million times in the UK since it launched in 2006. It is the third most popular BBC podcast after Radio 4's Friday Night Comedy and The Archers.

== Awards ==
Year	Ceremony	Award	Result
2006	Sony Radio Academy Awards	Interactive Programme Award	Gold
2007	Loaded Lafta Awards	Funniest Radio Show	Won
2007	Sony Radio Academy Awards	Interactive Programme Award	Bronze
2008	Sony Radio Academy Awards	Entertainment Award	Silver
2008	Loaded Lafta Awards	Funniest Radio Show	Won
2009	Sony Radio Academy Awards	Music Radio Personality of the Year	Nominee
2010	Loaded Lafta Awards	Funniest Radio Sidekick (Beccy Huxtable)	Won
2010	Sony Radio Academy Awards	Music Radio Personality of the Year	Won
