= Greg James (radio show) =

British weekday radio show

- Other names: The Greg James Show, Radio 1's Drivetime Show
- Genre: Music and talk
- Running time: 210 minutes (as Radio 1 Breakfast; 2018-present); 165 minutes (2012-2018); 180 minutes (2009-2012); 150 minutes (2007-2009) (4:00 pm – 7:00 pm)
- Country of origin: United Kingdom
- Language: English
- Home station: BBC Radio 1
- Starring: Greg James, Chris Smith
- Produced by: Chris Sawyer; Grace Hopper (assistant producer)
- Recording studio: Studio 82D, Broadcasting House
- Original release: 1 October 2007 – 19 July 2018
- Audio format: Stereo
- Opening theme: Film Trailer Music
- Website: www.bbc.co.uk/programmes/b0080x5m
- Podcast: Greg James: That's What He Said

Greg James is a British weekday radio show previously broadcast on BBC Radio 1, starring Greg James as the main presenter. It was broadcast Monday to Thursday from 4:00pm until 7:00pm, which included a 15-minute break for Newsbeat at 5:45pm. The main focus of the show was music and entertainment in the form of features and celebrity interviews. The show achieved a Sony Radio Academy Award in 2014 for 'Best Entertainment Programme' and an ARIA in 2016 for 'Best Entertainment Production'. The final show aired on 19 July 2018 as James went on to present Radio 1 Breakfast.

== History ==
After joining BBC Radio 1 in June 2007 and presenting the early breakfast show from October 2007, on 21 September 2009, a new schedule was launched on Radio 1, and it was announced that James would move to an Early Afternoon slot; 1pm to 4pm - replacing Edith Bowman, who moved to the weekend breakfast slot. It was in this early afternoon slot that the majority of the features in the current show were formed. His early breakfast show was taken over by Dev.

It was announced on 28 February 2012 that James and Scott Mills would swap shows as of 2 April 2012. James hosted the 'drive time' show (4–7pm) weekdays, while Mills took over the weekdays 'early afternoon' show (1–4pm).

James's drivetime show was initially produced by Laura Sayers (known as Headmistress Laura), with Sarah Underwood, and later Pippa Taylor as Assistant Producer. After Sayers left the show to go on maternity leave, she was replaced by Taylor, and new Assistant Producer Travis Walby joined. James is joined regularly by newsreader Chris Smith (referred to as Chris Smith With The News), who takes part in a number of segments during the show, when he is free of Newsbeat duties. There used to be a daily handover at 19:00 with Zane Lowe, prior to his departure from Radio 1. This tradition ended when Annie Mac took over Zane's show. Dev is the regular cover, who would also involve Smith, Taylor and Walby in the discussions, and continue some of the regular features. In June 2015, Taylor and Walby left the show; Taylor to eventually work on The Chris Moyles Show on Radio X, Walby to produce the weekend shows. Their final show was on 5 June 2015. Ian Chaloner took over producing, with Jenny Keough as assistant producer. It was at this point that Chris Smith's involvement in the show was reduced somewhat, with him no longer participating in links and features between 4:30 and 5:45, including Nerd Alerts and Rage Against the Answer Machine, or regularly speaking to Greg after the news. He now appears only between 6:10 and 6:30 on certain days.

The show has over five million listeners, and won a Sony Radio Academy Award in 2014 for 'Best Entertainment Programme'. It won silver the year before. It won the Gold for Best Entertainment Production at the ARIAS 2016.

From 10 December 2012 for a week, James hosted his show from the BFBS Radio Studio in Camp Bastion, Afghanistan. Whilst in Camp Bastion, James met with a large number of troops and invited some personnel to 'shout-out' to their family and friends, and also invited celebrities to read out messages from the families of serving soldiers from the BBC Radio 1 studios in London.

In the week leading up to T in the Park, Greg often takes the show to Scotland to participate in activities there. In 2012 and 2013, this was 'Sofa Surfing', where Greg would stay with listeners and take part in activities chosen by them. In 2014, he put on G In the Park, a mini-music festival from the BBC in Glasgow, with tents where he and several listeners would sleep, and music acts would play on a stage. Every night was live streamed online, on Radio 1's website and on YouTube..

On 24 October 2013, the first episode of the That's What He Said podcast was released, featuring Greg and newsreader Chris Smith chatting about what happened on his radio show over the previous week, and playing out the highlights.

In March 2015, following changes to the global release day for singles, Radio 1 announced its own changes to the Official Chart Show. From July 2015, it will move to Friday afternoons, between 16:00 and 17:45, integrating into James' current show, with James as host.

In February 2016, Greg took part in the Gregathlon for Comic Relief, in which he completed five triathlons in five days in five cities. This was whilst still doing the show every day at 4pm from the city he had done the triathlon in. During this week, Alice Levine co-hosted the programme from the location.

It was announced on 31 May 2018 during the Radio 1 Breakfast Show that current Breakfast Show host Nick Grimshaw would be switching shows with James in September 2018 effectively ending the Greg James show. Some features of the Greg James show will move with him to the Breakfast Show with James stating "There will be bits that will come with me and the spirit of the show will come with me". It was announced on 7 July 2018 edition of the podcast that Chris Smith would not be joining Greg on the breakfast show, ending their on-air partnership after seven years. A change.org petition was started by fans in an attempt to reverse this decision.

== Features ==
=== Most Popular ===
- Big Thursday Guest - A high-profile celebrity guest would come on the show on a Thursday.
- Film Reviews - Radio 1 Movie Critic Ali Plumb, and previously Rhiannna Dhillon, reviewed the latest releases in the cinema every Thursday.
- Impossible Karaoke - Two callers went against each other with their renditions of difficult-to-sing songs.
- The Official Chart Update
- Rage Against the Answer Machine - People would call a special phone number (03703 333 433) to rant about things that annoy them, which Greg and a guest (usually a fellow Radio 1 DJ, including the likes of Clara Amfo, Alice Levine, Annie Mac, Huw Stephens, Scott Mills, Chris Stark and Charlie Sloth) then go through on a Wednesday. This feature has created a number of running gags, including "I can't do a survey if it's not in the right place, Simon". Messages are often started by saying, "Do you know what really (somethings) my (something else commonly associated with something). This feature began in early 2013, and uses the song "Killing in the Name" by Rage Against the Machine. It used to be hosted every week by Greg and Chris Smith, but this changed to a rotation of DJs in mid-2015."
- Shouldn't Be News - Greg was joined by Chris Smith to go through well known facts that listeners have only recently learnt.
- The Ten Minute Takeover - This feature began on the afternoon show, usually happening daily at about 15:00, and moved to the drivetime show happening straight after Newsbeat at 18:00, Monday to Thursday, and also the Breakfast Show at 09:00. Listeners contact the show requesting a song, of which three are chosen, one each from the text, Facebook and Twitter. The following criteria have to be met in order for it to be played: it must not have been played on the show already that day, and it must be in the Radio 1 computer system. This second rule has created much controversy over the years, because songs are regularly not in the system, leading Greg to criticize the 'music police', who delete songs they consider to be too old for the station. The feature is a parody of the former 'Ten Hour Takeover' request feature that used to happen on bank holidays.
- Unpopular Opinions - People would call or text, or get in touch via social media, to voice opinions that are likely to be deemed unpopular by other people. The theme tune was that of the BBC TV show Playdays.
- What's My Age Again - Greg and Chris would speak to three callers and ask them questions, with the objective of guessing their age. Whoever guessed the closest won the round, and the winner was decided via the best of three. The theme tune was "What's My Age Again?" by Blink-182.
- Wrong 'Uns - Introduced in August 2015, a quiz in which a caller must answer a series of questions incorrectly. This was broadcast every Tuesday at 17:10. Producer Ian Chaloner takes the role of 'quiz adjudicator' and gives a score at the end of the quiz, ensuring answers were not repeated or too irrelevant for the question context. Callers were encouraged to beat the previous week's score. This feature replaced Nerd Alerts.

=== Recurring ===
These features didn't happen regularly, but reappeared from time to time, some more frequently than others.

- Rent-A-Greg - A feature where Greg runs random errands for listeners, including driving a listener to the airport at 2:00am and acting as a receptionist in a nail salon. This first aired during the summer of 2016, and returned for the summer of 2017.
- Accent or Faccent- This game involves three callers doing accents. Greg, Chris Smith or a guest must ask them three questions after which they must decide which caller(s) is/are doing a real accent (accent), and which are doing a fake accent (faccent). The theme tune is the theme tune to Keeping Up Appearances.
- Just What the Doctor Ordered - Chris Smith plays the part of a doctor, who needs certain things. Greg must remember as many as he can. This feature happened only a few times, on the afternoon and drivetime show.
- Lady Time (with Greg and Chris) - Ladies call up Greg and Chris to ask for advice about lady problems. Lady Time happens once a month, and the theme is "Lady Time, with Greg and Chris", sung over Jazz Talk by Doug Perkins. This has been done on many occasions with guests on the show, and on one occasion, whilst sitting in, Alice Levine hosted an edition of 'Lad Time'.
- The Mayor of Where - Long running feature that began in early 2014. Greg and Chris get a mayor on the phone, and ask them five questions in order to ascertain their 'mayorabouts' and guess what town they are the mayor of. This used to happen on a Thursday, but was moved to Wednesday to create time on Thursday's show for the fired Apprentice candidates, and was never returned to its original slot. When the mayor is Scottish, the feature is renamed "The Provost of Wovost", and when a mayor is unavailable, the feature is replaced with "The Claire of Where", "The Clown From Which Town" or in December 2016, "The Dame From The Town Of What Name" when Greg and Chris had to guess which town a pantomime dame was performing in.
- Talk 'Til The Cows Come Home - Two callers would compete to talk about a certain subject for as long as possible. Chris Smith With the Moos was the a-moo-dicator, who would sound a cow's moos when he believes they have run out of things to say. It is based loosely around Radio 4 comedy Just a Minute. It began in late 2014.
- The Tiny Big Thursday Guest Game - On occasions where a Big Thursday Guest could not be booked, Greg and Chris play this instead. Clips from guests who have been on the show are played out, but at a higher pitch, and a caller must guess who the guest was.
- North Star Caller - A variation of 'Star Caller' done at Christmas, where young children get phoned by Santa Claus (played by Chris Smith).
- Tiny Celebrity Party - Chris Smith reads a story involving tiny celebrities, and Greg does their voices using a voice changer to make himself more high pitched. Tiny celebrities have included Tiny Gary Barlow, Tiny Hillary Devey, Tiny Fearne Cotton, Tiny Nick Grimshaw, and Tiny Kanye West.
- Tiny Kanye's Big Quiz- Tiny Kanye West spawned his own feature. He is the host of his Big Quiz, involving questions given to a caller from him and other Tiny Celebrities.

=== Former ===
- Ask the Nation - This began on the afternoon show, and continued on the drivetime show until mid-2014, when it was replaced with Nerd Alerts. A listener would call up with a dilemma, to which they would put several options to the nation. Ten calls would then be taken, telling the listener which option to choose, or often creating solutions of their own. It used the theme music to Little Britain.
- The Blunder Log - The natural successor to 'Best Bit of the Radio'. It involved Greg playing out clips of mistakes from other radio stations or TV programmes. This feature began on the drivetime show, and happened sporadically. It hasn't featured since early 2013.
- Feet Up Friday - This began on the afternoon show. Two teams of listeners would come in and play games, including 'The Yes/No Game' and 'The Square' to win Feet Up Friday. When Greg moved to drivetime, the feature was reinvented so that the two teams make music choices to be played between 17:15 and 17:45, the winning team, that got to play their choices, was chosen by listener vote. This feature ended when The Official Chart occupied the Friday show.
- Flash Flash - At the beginning of the Early Breakfast show, Greg would play the piece "In the Mood" by Glenn Miller, whilst singing "flash flash" to the tune and encouraging listeners to flash any lights they had available in time with the music.
- The Going Home Song - A song sung every day (except Fridays due to the Official Chart) at 16:10 between June 2012 and December 2017, with three people who are going home singing to the tune of "Nut Rocker" by B. Bumble and the Stingers. It is often themed, for people with specific characteristics. In May 2016, singer Craig David recorded his own version of the "Going Home Song".
- Greg's Best Bit of the Radio From Yesterday - A daily feature on the early breakfast and afternoon shows. Greg played out a clip from another radio station that he finds amusing, usually of slip ups. On Monday, this would be Greg's Best Bit of the Radio from Friday.
- Nerd Alerts - This feature began in 2014, and happens on a Tuesday. People email in to report inaccuracies (acts of nerder) spotted on TV and Radio, and Greg and Chris go through them and point them out, or at times proving the nerds to wrong. When this happens, Greg will sing the "Up Yours" song. The correspondence often causes passionate discussion amongst the nerds, with each trying to prove the last wrong. Greg has often stated that it is not a nerd hunt, but a celebration of nerds and pedantry. The theme tune is the theme from Star Wars, with Greg and/or Chris singing "Nerd Alerts" over the top. It was quietly dropped in late 2015.
- Pun Pong - Greg and a caller compete to come up with the most puns on a given topic. The topic is revealed, after which they have the duration of one song to come up with the puns and must deliver them in a quickfire alternating style. Producer Ian is known as the "Iandependent adjudicator" with the occasions where he is absent filled by assistant producer Jenny. The loser is the first person to run out of puns. The theme tune is the Take Me Out theme. This replaced Star Caller on Mondays.
- Secret Teacher - This feature ran from September 2012 to early 2013 on Wednesdays. Greg would hear weekly from an anonymous 'secret teacher', in her first term as a newly qualified teacher at a secondary school. She wrote a diary, detailing her embarrassing situations, and often criticized her rival 'Miss Perfect'. The feature ended after people from her school began to discover her identity.
- Star Caller - The feature began on the afternoon show, and took place on Monday. A celebrity phones up someone, who has the opportunity to chat to them and ask a question. It was decided in 2015 that people being called were no longer allowed to ask for a follow on Twitter, after people complaining about it on Rage Against the Answer Machine.
- The Summer Mix - An hour of upbeat, uninterrupted music mixed together from 6pm until 7pm every day. Broadcast throughout the summer holiday period of 2015, it replaced any other features usually taking place in that slot (such as the Ten Minute Takeover Monday-Thursday and Dance Anthems on a Friday). It returned in the summer of 2016 but in a modified format, so that it was only half an hour and ran from 15:45-16:15, thus only occupying fifteen minutes of Greg's show.

=== One Off ===
These features may have only appeared once or twice.

- Count the Cocks - An audio montage was played out containing clips of cockerels. Greg and Chris had to count them up, with the person with the least accurate answer having to present with a live cockerel called Penny on their head, as can be seen in this video. The theme tune was the words, "all you have to do is count the cocks / count the little cocks", to the tune of 'Old Macdonald Had a Farm'.
- Don't Put All Your Gregs In One Basket - This feature involved Chris Smith reading the entertainment news from a cardboard box as a forfeit, and the theme tune was the "James Bond Theme". It can be heard on 31 January 2014 podcast.
- How's Your Father - Greg gets people on the phone and asks them how their father is. The theme tune is the Thomas the Tank Engine theme.
- John Romero Thursdays - Since 5 May 2016 the Going Home song has been a special recording of accordion player and Britain's Got Talent contestant, John Romero, who played Nut Rocker for his audition on his show. It has become tradition that on Thursdays listeners will text the studio to remind Greg that they don't need participants for Friday's Going Home Song as there is no Going Home Song on a Friday (thanks to The Official Chart), and he kept incorrectly informing them this was the case by mistake.

== Parody videos ==
A common way in which James promotes his show is his parody videos, in which he dresses up as popular (often female) pop artists and does ridiculous parodies of their music videos. A popular recreation was of Miley Cyrus' 'Wrecking Ball'. It is one of Radio 1's most viewed YouTube videos.

He also did a version of Kiesza's 'Hideaway' and drove Taylor Swift around London while performing a 'lip-sync' video for her new song 'Blank Space'.

In 2013, Chris Smith wrote a Christmas parody of the Robin Thicke and Pharrell Williams song, Blurred Lines. Called Mulled Wines, and sung by Father Chris Smith and Pharrelf, the video featured celebrities such as Chris Martin, Fearne Cotton, Charlie Sloth, Jamie Oliver, and Jake Bugg. Zane Lowe said that if the song got more than one million views on YouTube, he would play it on his show. The video can be seen here.

== Awards and nominations ==
Year	Ceremony	Award	Result
2013	Sony Radio Academy Award	Best Entertainment Programme	Silver
2014	Sony Radio Academy Award	Best Entertainment Programme	Gold
2016	Audio & Radio Industry Awards (ARIAS)	Best Entertainment Production	Gold
