= Rebecca Huxtable =

British radio personality and producer

Rebecca 'Beccy' Huxtable
- Born: 12 August 1981 (age 44)
- Occupation: Radio Personality
- Employer: BBC
- Known for: The Scott Mills Show; 2CR FM - Now the Heart Network

Rebecca 'Beccy' Huxtable (born 12 August 1981) is a British radio personality and producer, best known for her work as an assistant producer and co-host of The Scott Mills Show with Scott Mills on BBC Radio 1. She left the show in January 2013 due to being diagnosed with multiple sclerosis, but plans to stay at the station and work with Aled Jones, presenter of The Surgery with Aled.

== Early life ==
Rebecca was born in Taunton, Somerset. She attended Crispin School and studied at Bournemouth University, graduating with a degree in Journalism.

== Radio career ==
She gained experience in radio broadcasting at local radio station, 2CR FM. She later worked freelance for Virgin Radio, and also briefly as a newsreader.

At BBC Radio 1, Huxtable worked with Sara Cox on her weekend radio show and then moved to work with Scott Mills. In April 2008 she replaced Laura Sayers as producer. She worked with Mills for almost five years before stepping down following long periods of time off due to ill health. In an interview she said "I haven't been on the show full time for a while. A while ago I got MS which is rubbish. I stopped walking, being able to rap. I want to come back to work full time but I can't do it".

During her time with Mills, she was the subject of, and brains behind, many show features. BeckyCam involved a camera being placed on her office desk and the footage streamed live on the Radio 1 website. The feature included visits from many celebrities, and evolved into ScottCam where Mills had cameras placed in his house for a week.

What's Beccy's Forte? began in May 2009 and set out to discover a skill that Huxtable could be successful at. Beatboxer Beardyman attempted to teach her to beatbox, and she also went on to try cheerleading, mind-reading, tennis, interviewing celebrities, and escapology. Beccy's Classifieds included her finding online adverts for obscure items that she thought were funny enough to buy. Only one item was ever purchased, a glass jar which was claimed to contain the ghost of ex-Beatle George Harrison. During the five years, she also produced the successful Scott Mills Daily podcast/free download.

== Awards ==
In January 2010, Huxtable won the Funniest Radio Sidekick in the Loaded Lafta Awards.
