= Chris Smith (newsreader) =

British children's author and broadcaster

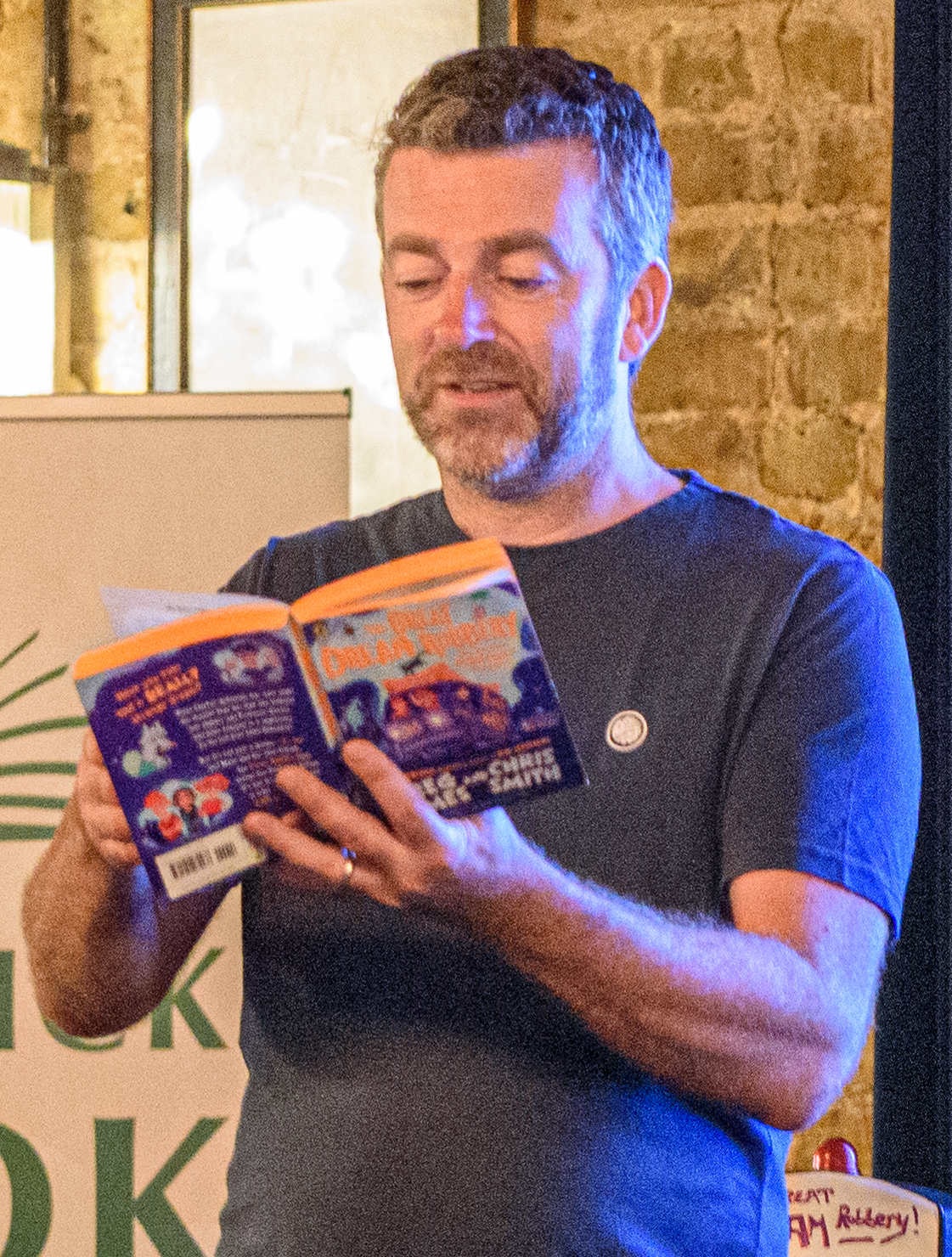
- Smith in 2022
- Born: Christopher Smith; January 24, 1973 (age 53); Kettering, England
- Education: Queens University of Belfast
- Occupation: Radio presenter
- Employer: BBC
- Known for: Children’s author and former presenter of Newsbeat on BBC Radio 1
- Website: www.chrissmithauthor.co.uk

Christopher Smith is a British children’s author and radio newsreader. He co-wrote the Kid Normal series of books, presented Newsbeat on BBC Radio 1 and co-hosted the That's What He Said podcast alongside Greg James.

== Early life ==
Smith was born in Kettering, England and grew up in Raunds. He studied English at Queen's University Belfast and was offered on-the-job training at a radio station afterwards. Then, he started reading the news on air.

== Radio ==
Smith first broadcast on Chiltern Radio in Dunstable, where he started as an intern and became trainee journalist afterwards. He then moved to the newly launched Heart 106.2 in London. He was the newsreader and cohost on the Christian O'Connell breakfast show on XFM London. When O'Connell moved to Virgin Radio (now Absolute Radio), Smith joined him. He left in 2007 and began reading the news on BBC Radio 1. He took over from Tulip Mazumdar as the regular afternoon newsreader in May 2011. These bulletins were simulcast on BBC Radio 1Xtra from September 2012. He regularly presented both the 12:45 and 17:45 Newsbeat programmes.

Smith joined Radio 1's Greg James Show regularly and took part in a number of segments during the show, when he was free of Newsbeat duties. Smith was also co-host of the "Greg James - That's What He Said Podcast", that started in October 2013 and was released every Friday until August 2018.

On the podcast, Smith established himself as a singer/songwriter by writing, producing and singing 'The Ghost Owl' song and the theme tune to the game 'Mug on a Dog'.

In March 2015, Smith travelled to Uganda alongside James, 1Xtra's Yasmin Evans and other celebrities including Alex Jones, Richard Hammond and Dermot O'Leary to participate in Comic Relief's Operation Health, a project to refurbish the Iyolwa Health Centre in eastern Uganda. Radio 1 listeners raised £551,405.

It was announced on the That's What He Said podcast that Smith would not be moving with Greg James to read the news on the Radio 1 Breakfast Show, and shortly after Greg left drivetime, Smith announced he was moving to an off-air role. He presented his final Newsbeat programme on Friday 10 August 2018, during which his colleagues paid tribute to him.

== Other work ==
Together with Greg James, Smith wrote a children's book titled Kid Normal. It was published by Bloomsbury on 13 July 2017 in the UK and is available in three languages, English, Spanish and German.

Smith features on the George Michael song "Outside". The track samples Smith reading the sentence "George Michael has been arrested in a park in Los Angeles" as part of a news bulletin. His voice is also heard towards the end of the Bad Education Movie reading out a news story about the resignation of a fictitious Conservative Member of Parliament for Cornwall.
