= Laura Busson =

British radio personality

Laura Margaret Busson
- Born: Laura Margaret Sayers; 11 October 1978 (age 48); York, England
- Occupations: Radio programme controller and executive, author
- Known for: The Scott Mills Show, Laura's Diary, Radio 1's Official Chart Show, Nick Grimshaw, Huw Stephens, Greg James
- Spouse: James Busson

Laura Margaret Busson (née Sayers; born 11 October 1978) is BBC Radio 2's Commissioning Executive and deputy to the Head of Station, Helen Thomas. She was well known for her former role as sidekick and Assistant Producer for Scott Mills on BBC Radio 1. She later became the producer for Greg James, before leaving to join Heart Yorkshire as programme controller.

== Background ==
Originally from York, England, where she was educated at The Mount School, York, Sayers later moved to Glasgow where she studied for 4 years achieving a Master of Arts in theatre and the English language. This is where she had her first experiences in radio at student station Subcity Radio.

== Radio 1 ==
Laura started at Radio 1 by applying for a BBC Talent production traineeship with Jocelin Stainer from The Chris Moyles Show, near the end of the traineeship she started working on the Scott Mills show.

As well as being an assistant, she occasionally produced shows for Scott Mills, Sara Cox, Jason King and Joel Ross. At the end of March 2008, she was promoted to a new position within Radio 1 as producer of Fearne Cotton and Reggie Yates' weekend shows, which includes the official chart show. For a time she was the assistant producer of the Nick Grimshaw show, Monday – Thursdays 10pm-midnight. She produced Huw Stephens' two Wednesday night shows and subsequently replaced producer Neil as Greg James' producer.

=== Laura's Diary ===
During October 2005, when the team were temporarily presenting The Chris Moyles Show, Laura's sister Mary Sayers (now Jones) who had found Laura's teenage diaries in her bedroom at her family house in York, was asked to read the diaries out on air.

The team decided to carry this feature on again when they next covered for Moyles during January 2006 and began Season 2, entitled "The College Years". This season consisted of the revelation of her love of her piano teacher in 1996.

'Laura's Diary' became such a hit with Mills' listeners, it was moved to the afternoon show.

In Season 4, Laura talks of troubles at university and the woes of attempting to have a long-distance relationship with Ben. The season ends with Ben dumping Laura by letter.

Mills joked a couple of times during the readings that because Laura was "unlucky in love" he would make it his mission to help her. This led to the hit Radio 1 tour 'One Night with Laura' – an X Factor-style tour of the UK auditioning suitable boyfriends for Sayers.

=== One Night with Laura ===
Potential partners were asked to fill in a form on BBC Radio 1's website and, because of the success, in the last week of March 2006 a tour known as 'One Night with Laura' took place in Southampton, Cardiff, Nottingham, Newcastle and Glasgow. The contestants had to impress Laura, and a panel of judges, enough for it to be decided that they were right for her. This included many strange occurrences such as a contestant lying on a bed of nails and asking Sayers to stand on his back.

On the judging panel were herself, Scott Mills, her father Stephen and Mark "Chappers" Chapman. On the last two nights Chapman, who had other commitments, was replaced by Laura's sister, Mary Sayers, and Jo Whiley. The auditionees came and went and were whittled down to just four partners from each of the auditions in Southampton, Cardiff, Nottingham and Newcastle (nobody qualified from Glasgow). These were Ben, James, Gareth and Shep. James was the first person to be voted out by the public.

Each of the final three were paraded on Radio 1 over a week of breakfast shows, participating in tasks and taking part in interviews to try to win over their all important votes. The final took place on 7 April 2006 and saw Gareth from Chard win the public vote.

She dated one of the original contestants (whom she later married) James Busson from Chichester. She had earlier voiced her disappointment that James did not make it to the final.

=== Laura's Diary – The Book ===
Because of the success of the diary on Radio 1, Laura's Diary was released to the public as a book on Thursday 30 November 2006. It included entries not heard during the radio broadcasts.

== Heart Radio ==
Busson left BBC Radio 1 to work for Heart Yorkshire as Programme Controller in July 2015.

== Radio 2 ==
In August 2020 Busson rejoined the BBC as BBC Radio 2's Commissioning Executive and deputy to the Head of Station, Helen Thomas.
