= I Survived a Zombie Apocalypse =

- Genre: Reality Game show
- Presented by: Greg James
- Country of origin: United Kingdom
- Original language: English
- No. of series: 1
- No. of episodes: 8

Production
- Running time: 60 minutes
- Production company: Tiger Aspect Productions

Original release
- Network: BBC Three
- Release: 15 February – 30 March 2015

I Survived a Zombie Apocalypse is a 2015 reality TV game show made for BBC Three. It is described as "the toughest reality show on TV" and is presented by Greg James.

The show is centered on a group of contestants who must survive for seven days in an abandoned shopping centre overrun by zombies set six months after exposure to "5G Wifi". They have to make base, secure food, shelter and safety, and complete tasks set by the army. After seven days the army will evacuate any survivors out of the area to a "global tropical quarantine area".

The show was filmed at the Freeport Leisure and Retail Village in West Calder, Scotland. The zombies were all trained by ScareScotland a company that specialises in horror actors for film, theatre, events and television.

== Contestants ==
Name	Age	Hometown	Arrived	Status
Amena Jefferies	18	Leeds	Day 1	Survived
Leah Guttridge	24	Wolverhampton	Day 1	Survived
Megan Oxtoby	20	Malvern	Day 1	Survived
Nic Sanderson	27	York	Day 4	Survived
Aston Wilkins	24	Farnborough	Day 1	Died Day 7
Jackie McKenzie	56	Solihull	Day 1	Died Day 6
Jordan Lewis	18	Bedford	Day 4	Died Day 6
Sara Donegan	18	London	Day 1	Died Day 5
Jonas Zimnickas	32	Cambridge	Day 1	Died Day 5
Natasha "Tasha" Maltman	22	Larne	Day 4	Turned into a Zombie Day 5
Kavon Everett	20	London	Day 1	Died Day 3
Thom Oakley	26	Birmingham	Day 1	Died Day 2
Luke Shaw	33	Cambridge	Day 1	Died Day 2

== Series summary ==
According to the prequel comic by illustrator Nik Holmes, "5G Wi-fi" is released by tech mogul Declan Hugh who had exploited a legal loophole by pushing existing Wifi infrastructure without adequate testing, thus weakening the blood-brain barrier culminating in infection to the user. Over the coming days, a majority of the UK public begin developing a pink eye infection culminating in zombification. With the situation out of hand, the army has ordered all civilians to the Monroe Shopping Village and await extraction in seven days.

The series is set six months after the outbreak, and originally follows a group of 10 contestants who have successfully reached the shopping centre, now abandoned and overrun by zombies. They take refuge in a two-level clothing store, which has been hastily transformed into a barricaded shelter by the army. The shelter is equipped with a communications room for contact with the outside. During their stay, the army periodically requests the survivors to nominate individuals to leave the shelter and undertake dangerous tasks, such as retrieving food and supplies to improve the group’s living conditions. After seven days, the army will evacuate any remaining survivors to a “global tropical quarantine area” until the crisis subsides, allowing them to eventually return to their normal lives.

Each episode chronicles events during the 7 day period with sporadic intervals from presenter Greg James, (who in the show's fictional premise, is one of the remaining presenters still alive in the country after the outbreak, and is surviving on his own, far away from the shopping center) commenting on the progress of the contestants and Public Service Announcement's from the "Preventative Agency for Neurological Transformations and Zombification" (P.A.N.T.Z.) advising how to stay alive during the outbreak, in black humor sketches for comic relief.

== Episodes ==
No.	Title	Original release date
1	"Day One"	15 February 2015
The contestants (known as survivors) make their way to Monroe Shopping Village in groups or individually with Megan and Aston arriving first followed by the trio of Amena, Jackie and Kavon. The survivors locate a walkie-talkie in the food hall which provides communication with the army and are directed to a supply crate with basic rations. Jonas is the next person to join the group and attempt to forcibly enter their main compound (a two-level clothing store) without success. Luke, Sara and Thom make their way to the rest of the group under instruction from the army to obtain a keycode from Frank, a dead security guard. The nine survivors begin to set up their temporary home after gaining entry to the main hall and designate beds and roles to ease the stress of the situation. The army activate a video link in a communications room and inform Kavon and Amena that evacuation will be in seven days, to be cautious with their rations and have plenty of sleep. Thom and Sara spend a lot of time together as well as Kavon and Amena whilst Jonas admits to struggling with English when it comes to telling jokes. During their first meal together, talk turns to someone within the group potentially being a zombie with Thom administering army-approved tests such as searching backpacks for wireless technology, skin lesions and performing a balance test. Aston and Luke go on the first mission to Walking Ed's Camping Store and get basic comfort items. They succeed, but not before being chased by three zombies. As the survivors talk among themselves in the seating area, the final survivor, Leah runs to the door with everybody going to help except Jonas who says to not let her in. The episode closes with Leah joining the group and the survivors going to sleep. Ending music: Zombie by Jamie T Survivors remaining: 10
2	"Day Two"	22 February 2015
With food and water supplies running low, attention turns to how they will manage rations from day to day. Jonas asks Amena about a potential relationship with Kavon which she denies any involvement in. The army instruct the survivors to reach a "missing persons" wall in the event that people may be looking for them and potentially, more survivors with Thom and Sara volunteering despite Sara having reservations about the mission, whilst this occurs an electrical storm scrambles the system that the army use to track the survivors location whilst on missions. Returning to base, Thom and Kavon have a disagreement dividing the group. Thom beings to question whether or not they should be saved as there are more important people to be saved over them, whilst the group have resorted to using boiled rain water as a drinking source. Their next mission tasks Leah, Amena and Jonas to reach a water supply and fill canteens which they complete with relative ease that lifts the morale, Jonas explains how he lost his leg leading to how he obtained his prosthetic and Leah reveals to Thom and Sara that she was born male. As night falls, the electrical storm passes over with the army instructing three survivors to find food at an abandoned shopping centre. During the mission, Luke, Megan and Kavon are trapped by several zombies and attempt to distract them without much success, seeing an opening to escape, Megan and Kavon manage to do so whilst Luke is killed. Returning to base, the group mourn Luke's death but all agree they would happily have Luke alive rather than the food. The earlier conflict between Thom and Kavon continues with Sara, Leah and Thom talking about how Amena and Kavon are separating themselves from the group and aren't being team players. At the height of the storm, lightning strikes and the power supply opens the shutters to the base camp with Thom and Amena going to restore power though some believe the pairing to be ineffective. Thom and Amena successfully restore power but Amena inadvertently slams a panel alerting a lurking Zombie in her vent. Thom is unable to escape and is killed by another zombie lurking in his vent. The episode closes with the army discussing how to retain the remaining survivors whilst the base suffers a flood, restricting their space further and the audience hears the last words of Luke and Thom before their deaths. Ending music: Zombie Delight by Buck 65 Survivors remaining: 8
3	"Day Three"	1 March 2015
With the electrical storm passed, the survivors anxiously await their next mission by personalising their living space. Lacking essential cleaning supplies, Aston and Amena head to the shopping centre and narrowly escape infection when a group of faster-than-normal zombies almost penetrate the first blockade of the base. Jackie, Sara and Jonas then head out to replenish their water supply - the group discuss strength in the group and notice that Jackie is arguably the weakest as she cooks for the group and is more likely to avoid going on missions. Sara confides to Jackie that she feels pressured by Amena to perform better despite her going on two missions. As night falls, the army instruct three survivors to reach a garden centre for supplies which leads to a heated argument between Amena and Sara as Amena believes Sara only goes on missions during the day. Aston, Kavon and Megan head out however visibility has been reduced. Collecting the supplies, the army patch through to the survivors on mission and inform that they're working on a way to get them back to base. Back at base, Sara apologises to Amena for the earlier incident and volunteers herself for the next mission regardless of the time of day. Back on the mission, a hoard of zombies have gathered outside and in order for the three to return safely they must separate to avoid suspicion. Aston goes first by smothering himself in zombie remains (to cover his scent) and returns to base. Amena is once again questioned about her alleged relationship with Kavon but denies it admitting Kavon is like a brother after stating she wouldn't eat until he returns. Kavon chooses to go through a research area where several zombies are chained together, under orders to stay quiet and move slowly, he runs and jumps on tables alerting the zombies to his presence and is killed. With all available routes blocked, Megan must reach a scaffolding tower and navigate several floors of zombies then work her way back down to return to base which she successfully does. The group believe Kavon to have died as he left before Megan which upsets Amena as she didn't get the chance to say goodbye to him. Leah criticises Amena's choices for the mission and the two get into a shouting match. The episode closes on Amena still mourning the loss of Kavon. Ending music: DJ, Ease My Mind by Niki & The Dove Survivors remaining: 7
4	"Day Four"	8 March 2015
With eighty-seven hours remaining until army evacuation and emotions running high the group are solemn except for Megan and Aston who both dreamed that they were eaten by zombies. Jonas attempts to comfort Amena whilst talk turns to who will go on the next mission. Sometime later, Jordan and Nic, two new survivors are seen approaching the northwest side of the shopping village but are blocked by a disused checkpoint which has a smartphone that when rung alerts the infected. Nic takes the phone to distract the zombies giving Jordan the chance to unlock the cage and reach base camp, however exposure to the phone has started a countdown in which Nic has four hours to be cured otherwise he'll become infected. As the survivors in base camp watch on, Jordan bangs on the door though Jackie is skeptical about him. After completing the army approved tests, he is welcomed. As the army scan for preventative antibiotics, Amena and Jackie bring Jordan up to speed about the situation. With the zombies focused on Nic, the rest of the area is clear and with the antibiotics located, Leah and Sara head out to retrieve the medicine but are given the option to spend the money on alcohol instead. The group decide on the antibiotics. With time running out and the horde growing in number around Nic, Jackie and Jordan head out to rescue him. Jordan is tasked to divert attention away whilst Jackie administers the medicine, Nic is rescued and joins the group and he settles in. He then announces he is deaf, but is able to communicate via lipreading. Jonas and Amena head on the next mission to retrieve more food from a morgue but must act dead as a group of zombies scour the area, upon returning to base, Amena and Jonas are both sick. After settling down for their evening meal, the group decide by drawing the lowest numbered playing card to determine who goes on the next mission with Megan and Aston being selected though Megan is starting to show unusual behavior. As they race back to base, the army locate a new survivor behind the approaching zombie horde following Aston and Megan. After being tested, she introduces herself as Tasha but when she is questioned on her missing backpack, she claims to have left it in a caravan and she ran straight through a group of zombies. Amena tells Megan and Jordan that she doesn't like Tasha as she is behaving erratically. Jackie feels nervous about Tasha and suggests to Jonas that someone stay up all night to keep an eye on her whilst Amena suggests that Aston and Megan begin a romance which they both laugh off. The episode closes on Greg James telling the audience that Tasha's backpack contained a 5G smartphone which she had used previously and her exposure to it has endangered the entire base. Ending music: She's a Zombie Now by The Meteors Survivors remaining: 10
5	"Day Five"	15 March 2015
New arrivals Jordan and Nic have integrated themselves into the group, however Tasha has shown signs of sleep deprivation and feeling unwell. Jackie questions the zombies shrieks and movements whilst Aston admits he would have sex with the zombie known as "The Bride". Attention turns to an eaten can of kidney beans to which Jackie believes that Tasha could be from another group of survivors and that she has joined them to sabotage their efforts of rescue, Tasha meanwhile complains of nausea to the Communications Room with the rest of the group theorise about her true intentions and why she did not have her bag with her. The army pick up an unusual signal and scan the area for antibiotics to no avail, however they find a food and water source near the disused caravan where Tasha had been previously and sent Nic, Amena and Tasha though before leaving, Jackie warned Amena to not trust Tasha. As the three approach the caravan, the army potentially discover a 5G signal but instead of aborting the mission they continue on. Nic searches for an exit whilst Amena looks for the food and Tasha grabs her rucksack, though the effects of the 5G cause her symptoms to worsen, turning her into a zombie and attacking Nic and Amena though she fails to kill them - the army restrict movement in the area as Tasha is now barricaded around the caravan. The pair return to base with Jackie feeling guilty about judging Tasha so early, but happy that her instincts were right and assume that any indications of flu-like symptoms could lead to a zombie infection. The army instruct the group to complete the balance test. Later on, Jonas creates a space for exercising which the group noting how strong he truly is. On their daily water collection, Jonas and Jordan are instructed to reroute the water mains as the supply has run dry. At the water mains supply, Jordan directs Jonas via a headset as he navigates a dark room to turn on the water however a loud hiss when activating the mains alerts the Zombies and as he is about to leave the room, Jonas is caught. Jordan returns on his own with the group upset at Jonas' death but shortly after all the survivors are sent out as a group to collect fresh food from the Garden Centre. During their mission, a group of recently infected zombies approach with the survivors all climbing into an abandoned vehicle. The army deduce that the zombies are still able to run and instead order the Survivors to return to base individually with Sara going first but she is caught and killed, her death gives the others the distraction needed to return to base. Jackie, however is trapped within the car. After a while, she manages to make it back to base unharmed, but not before being chased by a group of ravenous zombies. The group compare the deaths of Jonas and Sara as Sara's death was treated as light-hearted due to her apparent "zombie suicide" with Amena and Jackie contemplating whether or not their last mission was every man for themselves. The episode closes on the group toasting to Jonas and Sara. Ending music: Do The Zombie by The Symbols Survivors remaining: 7
6	"Day Six"	22 March 2015
The army pick up an unusual zombie heat signature, leading to the assumption of a previously tested zombie being the reason behind it. On their daily water mission, Jackie insists on a third person joining her and Leah who is agile enough to outrun the faster zombies though nobody volunteers. Whilst at the pump, the zombie detected by the army appears which they mistake as a slower zombie though he is shown to be fast and begins pursuit of Leah and Jackie. They make it back to base but do not secure the first barricade, allowing regular zombies and the larger Abomination (Stevie J. Douglas) to reach the food hall. The survivors watch as Abomination tears apart one of the surrounding zombies and then activates the shutter release but as the shutter does not open fully and the door is locked, he leaves. Greg James informs the audience that prior to the apocalypse Abomination was a security guard at the shopping village but due to his size he was antagonised by locals which filled him with hatred and coupled with the 5G signal makes him an uncontrollable force. The army observe his frantic behaviour and send two survivors to out to a laboratory on site to discover any weaknesses. Aston briefs the group with all eyes on Jackie to go out but she refuses with Nic and Jordan heading out. Whilst at the laboratory, the pair discover "The Abomination Project" and that changes in temperature will either increase of decrease the chance of Abomination attacking and unlike other zombies he is highly intelligent and self-aware, whilst gathering information they are almost caught but return to base. Jordan believes if they can lure Abomination into a freezer it would stop him permanently. Sometime later as Nic and Jordan head to the Communications Room, Jackie rallies the others to send Jordan back out as he is trying to send everyone else out and come up with a plan to flatter him. Amena believes that Jordan is trying to go out on a mission with her so she can be used as bait with Leah stating that at this point it is every man for themselves and Aston saying that Nic and Jordan should be next to die, leaving the original survivors to reach quarantine. The army locate a freezing unit that requires unblocking and request one survivor to complete the mission, Jackie's plan works as Jordan agrees to go with the intention of him being sent to his death. With tracking on Abomination at a standstill, Jordan unblocks the fan but cannot avoid the speed of Abomination who chases him and is killed. Back at base camp, the army relay Jordan's death to the group with Jackie reassuring the others that Jordan going for the mission wasn't strategical due to his annoying behaviour. With the group down to six, Nic is the only newcomer remaining in the group is assumed to be the next target. With the freezer active, the army tasks a team of four to lure and trap Abomination with Megan and Amena (the trap team) and Aston and Jackie (the luring team) taking the lead. The trap team head out first to ready the door whilst Aston and Jackie bait Abomination, though Jackie mistakenly runs into the freezer and is trapped with Abomination and ultimately killed as well as Abomination being subdued. The episode closes on Leah jokingly blaming Megan and Amena killing Jackie by locking her in the freezer as regular zombies begin to repopulate the perimeter. Ending music: Ready or Not by The Fugees Survivors remaining: 5
7	"Day Seven"	29 March 2015
With six hours to go until rescue, and zombie activity high around the base; the survivors are told by the army to prepare, and be ready to move at any moment with little warning. They inform the survivors that there is a silver case containing a flare, as well telling them they need fresh water and to eat. Leah admits they've eaten all the food, but may have some spare. The survivors spend some time packing their belongings into their bags; Amena remarks that "you can't make friends with zombies". As the group focus on what could happen today, Amena expresses worry. Megan tells everyone that it'll be okay as long as they all stick together, stay calm and listen to what the army's instructions. As the rescue helicopter's ETA becomes 30 minutes, the army see that the zombies are still moving towards the base, which may mean the group have to run for it to survive. A loud bang, followed by clattering, scares the survivors. It turns out the zombies have broken through the glass panels and into the food hall. The CCTV goes down, hindering the army's attempts to see how many zombies there are. When the CCTV comes back on, the zombies have vanished from the food hall and are now making their way to the rear of the base. A banging in the base confuses the survivors for a moment, until a wooden panel is broken through, reveal some of the large zombie horde attempting to reach the survivors. The army instruct the survivors to leave through the food hall as it is now clear, but not to forget the silver case with the flare. Nic runs back to grab the flare, narrowly missing the zombie horde as they fill up the base. The survivors are told to find a way to block the zombies if they want to make it to the rendezvous with the rescue helicopter. They use the missing persons wall, oil drums and wooden crates as a makeshift barrier, before hiding in the morgue. As they hide in the morgue, the survivors notice a zombie, and instantly assume that all of the horde are going to be coming their way. With zombies at the landing site and near morgue, the army focus on getting the survivors out the morgue safely. They instruct them to cover their bodies with the remains of the people bagged up in the morgue, so that the zombies won't be able to smell them. They do this, but not without complaining about the smell. The zombies lose interest in the area, as the army decide that one survivor should climb the scaffolding and light the flare, whilst the army's ground forces try to remove the zombies from the landing site. The survivors all try to make their way up to the top of the scaffolding as quietly as possible, with Nic setting the flare off just as the zombies break through the barrier. The survivors are instructed to hide in the supermarket now that the landing site is at risk of being overrun with zombies. The survivors barely make it to the supermarket, barricading the entrance as they try to hide out of sight of the horde. Some of the zombies manage to find a way around the barricade, by means of an air vent, which causes the survivors to try and use the shelves to hide themselves. Eventually the zombies lose interest and move away from the supermarket, but they are now blocking the only clear route to the landing site. The army decide the only way for the survivors to get there is to risk going past the chained zombies in the research area, despite the fact Kavon died in that area when he was sent through there. They tell the survivors to move slowly and cautiously in order to make it through. Leah, Amena and Megan make it through, despite each almost being grabbed. When Aston takes his turn through the area, he tries to hide between two zombies. Unfortunately, the zombies are just able to reach him and he is killed. Nic runs through whilst the zombies are distracted. Despite having to make it through the research area, the exit is now not clear. The army send the survivors through the contamination ward, where zombies are tied to beds, appearing to be asleep. As the survivors go through the screening doors one by one, the noise of the doors and the scan wakes the zombies. The zombies become more agitated with each survivors passing through the doors. When last to go through the doors, Leah, is scanned, the door detects a potential infection, and gives a warning of 30 seconds to leave, or exits are sealed. Amena and Nic follow instructions to hold a button in the doctor's office for five seconds to override the scan successfully, but the zombies are now escaping their restraints, due to the noise making them aggressive. The ground support arrives as the survivors escape the contamination ward. They all get inside the vehicle which drives around in a large circle, to pull the zombies away from the landing site. The survivors celebrate their victory a bit early, as they now need to be checked for any sign of infection before being allowed on the helicopter. The army will not allow anyone on board if they show even the slightest sign of infection. The survivors all manage to board the helicopter safely and quickly, as the zombies gather where the helicopter was, the group continue to celebrate the fact they have indeed, survived a zombie apocalypse. The credits are backed not with zombies this time, but the survivors in order of first dead to last alive. Ending music: Alive by Chase & Status feat. Jacob Banks Survivors rescued: 4
8	"Finale"	30 March 2015
The episode starts by going over how the infection started, showing news stories, BBC presenters being attacked by zombies and that Greg James was the only presenter to survive. As he narrates over the video, he begins to recap the events at the shopping village, starting with the survivors first entering the food hall and gaining access to the base. The rescued survivors begin to give their comments on living in the base. Amena remarks that it was "disgusting" as no-one could wash properly, as well as living off corned beef and pasta being "awful". Leah also says it was disgusting to live in the base. The first mission, where Aston and Luke retrieve bedding supplies, is shown, along with the power going down for the night. Greg James narrates that they were unaware of what was to come. The start of day two is shown, with Jackie telling Jonas there's not much water left, and Jonas answering back by telling Jackie they can drink each other's urine. The mission to retrieve supplies from the supermarket, which resulted in Luke being the first survivor to die, is shown. Megan narrates that it was scary, and she thought she was going to die there too. The mission involving returning power to the base is then shown, including where Thom met his death in the vents at the hands of a zombie policeman. Greg James comments that two deaths in one day was a clear sign of how deadly the missions were. Day three's mission of foraging for fresh food in the greenhouse being set and the argument between Amena and Sara about her not taking any missions was shown. Aston, Megan and Kavon being trapped and each taking their separate routes to try to escape is shown, with Greg James stating that the loss of Kavon "hit one of the survivors pretty hard". Amena admits that when Kavon died, she was "an emotional wreck". The arrival of Nic and Jordan on day four was shown. Greg James narrated that Nic's choice to use a 5G phone to distract the zombies was "brave or stupid, you choose". Nic narrates that he feels he's proven that despite being deaf, he proved himself useful. Natasha's arrival during the last mission of the day was noted to be a shock arrival and that she was welcomed at "arms length rather than with open arms", as the group suspected she was infected. Natasha's mentioned of feeling unwell on day five was mentioned, along with her turning into a zombie during the first mission of that day. Greg James then goes on to narrate how Natasha turning into a zombie wasn't really the big upset of that day, as the water mission that Jordan and Jonas went on, became more than just a simple water mission, and resulted in Jonas dying, which hit the group hard. Megan says how she would've liked to see Jonas survive. The last death of the day, Sara's is shown and mentioned as a "grizzly end". Day six, and the Abomination's arrival, including where it killed another zombies, was shown, along with how the group figured out extreme cold would be the best way to stop it. Jordan's death as he completed a mission was described as "a very tasty starter" by Greg James; he then described Jackie's death during the mission to freeze the Abomination as a "main course". Day seven was shown, as a day that, despite the five remaining survivors believing they were now safe, was completely the opposite. The attempt to go through the area where Kavon had died previously is shown, and Aston's death is described as him slipping at the last hurdle by Amena. Nic says that he thought that he should've gone but Aston had decided to go before him. With the rescue of the four remaining survivors shown, they quickly describe how they think it went. Nic says he'd never do it again, Leah says it was hell, Amena says she's glad to not have to see a zombie ever again and Megan says she wants to go have a bath as soon as. The episode ends with Greg James getting a 'group hug' from the zombies, as well as an update on the survivors from quarrantine. Amena is being persuaded by the army to sign up as they want her, Leah is considering a role in post-apocalyptic politics after being head hunted by the Prime Minister, Nic stands to make millions if he accepts a pay-per-view cage fight with a zombie, Megan has been offered a cookery show chance by the BBC, which will be titled 'How to be a meat free zombie' and Greg James is shown to now be a zombie after the group hug' he received earlier. Zombies are apparently being rehabilitated and integrated back into society, with examples such as the bride zombie finally getting to have a wedding and a zombie featuring on a cookery show as a guest. Ending music: Alive and Kicking by Simple Minds

=== Missions ===
In each episode, the Army instructs the Survivors via a Communications Room (or through a radio whilst out of base) to complete Missions which could potentially lead to those chosen having to face the Zombies and risking death. The Survivors either decide as a group or are nominated by the Army to venture out of base. A crossed out name indicates that the Survivor died during the mission. A mission is deemed complete if the primary objective is accomplished.

Day #	Briefing	Participated	Details	Result
1	Choosing two contestants who were agile, quick thinking and good at solving puzzles, they would race to Walking Ed's Camping Store, which doubled as a makeshift morgue, and retrieve basic comfort items for their bunks.	Aston, Luke	Aston and Luke reached the camping store and located the stock room. Retrieving the key from the general manager's corpse, the two gathered the comfort items and returned to base camp, but not before being chased by several zombies.	Completed
2	Choosing two contestants, they must reach "Zone B" and discover if any of their identities are shown on a missing persons wall.	Thom, Sara	Sara starts to have doubts about the mission with Thom reassuring her that it will be fine as long as they stick together. Arriving at the wall, Sara sees notices from her sister and father but after two zombies start to approach they return to base.	Completed
2	Three contestants selected by the army must reach a water pump in "Zone 2B" and fill up as many bottles as possible.	Leah, Amena, Jonas	Leah, Amena and Jonas reach the pump but the water runs slowly. They hear loud screams from the distance which attracts a zombie but are able to return to base with the water required.	Completed
2	Choosing three contestants, they must reach a looted shopping centre located in "Zone 6A" which is heavily populated with zombies and gather as much food as they can.	~~Luke~~, Megan, Kavon	Reaching the shopping centre, Luke, Megan and Kavon begin to gather supplies but their exit is blocked by several blinded zombies and attempt to create a distraction as they begin to lose space. Believing to have an opening, the three run but Luke is caught and killed.	Completed (1 Casualty)
2	Choosing two contestants, they must restore power in two stations after an electrical storm leaves base camp vulnerable, with the only way in and out via a series of air vents.	~~Thom~~, Amena	Thom and Amena enter separate vents each with a disadvantage of either restoring power or a longer path to the fuse panel. Amena slams a panel alerting a lurking zombie in the vents and escapes without Thom. Thom struggles with the panel and activates the power in time but his path is blocked by another zombie in the vents, due to the power room being too small to avoid the zombie he is killed.	Completed (1 Casualty)
3	Choosing two contestants, they must return to the shopping centre in Zone 6A and retrieve cleaning supplies.	Aston, Amena	Reaching the centre, Aston begins to gather supplies whilst Amena stays by the door as lookout. As they switch positions part way through, a small group of faster zombies approach and the two race back to base but narrowly escape infection.	Completed
3	The army instruct three contestants who haven't been out of base for 24 hours to replenish their water.	Jackie, Sara, Jonas	The three reach the supply but a car alarm is triggered as they are about to leave. The army sends Jonas to stop the alarm to avoid further zombies approaching but proves to be difficult as two zombies are already inside. Jonas and Jackie turn the alarm off from under the vehicles bonnet and the three return to base.	Completed
3	Choosing three contestants, they must reach a garden centre to collect vegetables at the other side of the shopping centre. Those chosen must have patience, skill and can forage.	Aston, Kavon, Megan	Reaching the garden centre, the three hesitantly scour the area and begin to collect vegetables whilst Aston believes they'll need to find a hiding spot in case of an attack. Aston and Kavon find lower ground whilst Megan is left on her own but is in sight. As they regroup and leave, they avoid a zombie and barricade the exit.	Completed
3	The army instruct one of the survivors to pass through the zombie horde undetected using a variety of zombie remains as the army believe that if they smell like a zombie then they will be treated as one of their own.	Aston	Entering the horde, Aston avoided detection by mimicking the zombies movements and returns to base.	Completed
3	Going through "Zone 6F" a deserted research area where chained up zombies are, the survivor must navigate their way through in order to reach a shortcut back to base.	~~Kavon~~	Approaching Zone 6F, Kavon radios for advice and is advised to take it slowly and stay out of their reach. Instead of following instructions, he flinches and begins to jump on tables but by doing so several zombies gather in the centre and he is killed.	Failed
3	Navigating their way through a scaffolding tower in "Zone 4F" the survivor must use stealth to avoid detection and return to base.	Megan	Megan reaches the scaffolding and makes her way to the top with relative ease and hides behind a large barrel, making her way back down and back to base a group of zombies nearly open the barricade however Jonas and Aston secure the doors.	Completed
4	Approaching a disused checkpoint, Jordan and Nic must decide between themselves who will act as bait whilst the other person races to camp. The person left behind would be exposed and must be rescued within four hours.	Jordan, Nic	Nic volunteers to distract the zombies away from Jordan who will unlock his checkpoint and race to base camp.	Completed
4	Choosing two survivors, those nominated must reach the Army Research Lab in "Zone 6A" to retrieve antibiotics. A blind zombie has been reported on location and must stay quiet. Upon reaching the medicine, they must choose between using the money on the medicine or comfort items.	Leah, Sara	As Leah and Sara approach the lab, the room is covered in trip wire with metal cans attached which they must maneuver around to locate a key directly facing the blind zombie. Although they're both scared to approach, Leah grabs the key and enters the secondary room where the antibiotics are located, but they had to choose between the antibiotics and an array of comfort items such as wine. Using a radio, they relay the dilemma back to base camp. The group decide against the comfort items and take the antibiotics and both Leah and Sara return to base.	Completed
4	Choosing two survivors, one must divert attention away from Nic's cage and whilst the other must watch Nic drink the antibiotics, failing to do so would result in the group being compromised. Once released, they must return to base.	Jordan, Jackie	The pair split up with Jordan banging on oil canisters which attracts the zombies around the cage, Jackie reaches Nic and tells him to drink the medicine as she gives him his key to escape. All three return to base and keep pressure on the door as the others help the barricade.	Completed
4	Survivors must head to a morgue in "Zone 4H" where the army believe extra food is located as a previous group of survivors held base there.	Amena, Jonas	As they approach the morgue, the army radio the pair of an approaching group of zombies and to mask their smell must cover themselves in rotten remains and play dead which they do so successfully and return with the food.	Completed
4	Choosing two survivors they must replenish their water canteens.	Aston, Megan, Tasha	Reaching the supply, Megan and Aston take turns on lookout unbeknownst that a horde of zombies are approaching. After arriving at the main entrance, Aston and Megan hear screams from a new survivor and rescue her.	Completed
5	With low zombie activity, three survivors must head out to the disused caravan in "Zone 7C" to collect food, water and the contents of Tasha's rucksack. As Tasha knows the location, she will lead.	~~Tasha~~, Nic, Amena	As they approach the caravan, the army discover a potential 5G signal. Amena and Nic locate food and find an emergency exit whilst Tasha obtains her rucksack, but the army pinpoint the 5G signal specifically within Tasha's bag. As she reaches for her bag, Tasha turns into a zombie and attacks Amena and Nic, though they escape and return to base.	Completed (1 Casualty)
5	Two survivors must collect their daily water ration but are advised that despite the zombie risk is low there is ample time for being attacked. With the water source dry, they must reroute a pipe in "Zone 6D" with one survivor directing the other in a pitch-black room populated by zombies.	~~Jonas~~, Jordan	Making their way to the water pump with four canteens, Jordan acts as lookout for Jonas but are then instructed to reroute the water supply as it has run dry. Jordan stays in the control room whilst Jonas navigates the pump room in complete darkness. After a discharge of steam alerts the zombies, Jonas almost exits the room but is caught and killed. Jordan returns to base with the water.	Completed (1 Casualty)
5	All the survivors must make their way to the Garden Centre for fresh food as the processed meats are taking a toll on their morale.	Amena, Aston, Jackie, Jordan, Leah, Megan, Nic, ~~Sara~~	Whilst en route, a large group of zombies block their path and must take cover in an abandoned vehicle.	Abandoned
5	With a group of recently infected zombies blocking their path, the survivors must individually return to base as quickly as possible.	Amena, Aston, Jackie, Jordan, Leah, Megan, Nic, ~~Sara~~	Sara is the first to run but is immediately caught. Taking advantage of the distraction, Amena, Megan, Aston, Leah, Nic and Jordan flee back to base. Jackie however is stuck in the car. She manages to finally escape, but is chased by a horde of zombies. She manages to make it back to the base without being harmed.	Completed (1 Casualty)
6	Two survivors must replenish their daily water supply.	Leah, Jackie	The girls doubt their ability to carry full containers of water when filling up as a larger zombie, Abomination, appears. They return to base but do not secure the first barricade.	Completed
6	Two survivors must head to a laboratory located in "Zone 6B" to gain information on how to stop Abomination.	Jordan, Nic	Reaching the laboratory with Abomination following them, the pair discover that lower temperatures decrease Abomination's likelihood of attacking. In addition, they take numerous documents but are ambushed by Abomination and narrowly evade death.	Completed
6	One survivor must head to a frozen food store located in "Zone 6E" and unblock the fan to the freezing unit via a series of air vents.	~~Jordan~~	Upon reaching the vent, Jordan crawls into Access Vent 2 unbeknownst that Abomination is not too far behind and has entered Vent 1. As Jordan unblocks the fan and heads back to the office he hears Abomination and at the last minute is caught and killed.	Completed^{^^} (1 Casualty)
6	Four survivors must trap Abomination in the frozen food store, two of the survivors will act as bait whilst the other two trap Abomination. There is a small hatch in the store that the survivor(s) may crawl through to safety; the Abomination won't fit in, however.	Aston, Amena, ~~Jackie~~, Megan	Amena and Megan as the trap team head out first and avoid detection then Aston and Jackie as the bait team head out next and get Abomination's attention with Aston keeping as much attention away from Jackie as possible. As they reach the Store, Jackie runs into the freezer, trying to get to the hatch. The Abomination follows her in, while the trap team close the door. Jackie doesn't reach the hatch in time and is killed. The other three return to base with Aston distraught at Jackie's death.	Completed (1 Casualty)

- ^Mission 4.5 Tasha joined the mission as Aston and Megan were returning to base.
- ^Mission 6.3 Jordan completed the mission but was killed before returning to base.

== Progress chart ==
Progress Chart
Survivor	Day 1	Day 2	Day 3	Day 4	Day 5	Day 6	Day 7	Missions
Amena	SAFE	SAFE					WON	7
Leah	SAFE	SAFE	SAFE	SAFE			WON	6
Megan	SAFE	SAFE					WON	7
Nic	NOT IN GAME			SAFE			WON	5
Aston	SAFE	SAFE	SAFE				DIED	7
Jackie	SAFE	SAFE	SAFE			DIED		5
Jordan	NOT IN GAME			SAFE		DIED		5
Sara	SAFE	SAFE			DIED			4
Jonas	SAFE	SAFE			DIED			5
Tasha	NOT IN GAME			SAFE	DIED			2
Kavon	SAFE	SAFE	DIED					2
Thom	SAFE	DIED						2
Luke	SAFE	DIED						2

The survivor won I Survived A Zombie Apocalypse.
The survivor lasted the entire day and did not go on a mission.
The survivor successfully completed a mission and returned to base.
The survivor joined partway through the mission and returned to base.
The survivor turned into a zombie during the mission.
The survivor went on a mission and was killed by a zombie.
The survivor died in an earlier episode and does not appear.

== See also ==
- Fight of the Living Dead: Experiment 88
