= Tulip Mazumdar =

British journalist and broadcaster

Tulip Mazumdar is a British journalist and broadcaster who currently works for the BBC as their global health reporter.

Mazumdar is from Peterborough, Cambridgeshire, her first name chosen by her mother as she looked out on tulip fields in Lincolnshire. She is of Indian Bengali descent.

She attended The King's (The Cathedral) School, Peterborough, and then the University of Liverpool before moving to work for BBC Radio Merseyside. From there she moved to the news department broadcasting on the BBC station 1Xtra. She has also worked on the BBC Radio 1 Newsbeat programme, the Radio 4 Today programme, Newsday on the BBC World Service and appeared on BBC television where she has reported from Helmand, Afghanistan, on the conflict and its impact on local communities. In 2014, Mazumdar reported for the BBC and world media on the Ebola virus epidemic in Sierra Leone.
