= Newsbeat =

UK Radio news programme

- Genre: News
- Running time: 15 minutes
- Country of origin: United Kingdom
- Language: English
- Home station: BBC Radio 1 (since 1973); BBC Radio 1Xtra (since 2012); BBC Asian Network (since 2020)
- Produced by: BBC News
- Edited by: Danielle Dwyer
- Recording studio: Broadcasting House, London (2013–2022); The Mailbox, Birmingham (2022 – present)
- Original release: 10 September 1973 – Present
- Audio format: Stereophonic sound
- Website: www.bbc.co.uk/newsbeat

Newsbeat is the BBC's radio news programme broadcast on Radio 1, 1Xtra and Asian Network. Newsbeat is produced by BBC News but differs from the BBC's other news programmes in its remit to provide news tailored for young people.

The fifteen-minute Newsbeat programme is broadcast at 12:45 and 17:45 during the week on Radio 1, 1Xtra and Asian Network. Short bulletins are also heard throughout the day on three stations on the half-hour with extra bulletins broadcast at peak times.

== History ==
BBC Radio 1's remit as a public service broadcaster meant it is required to broadcast news. Newsbeat was launched on 10 September 1973 in response to the impending launch of a network of commercial radio stations across the United Kingdom which supplied a news service very different from the style of traditional BBC News. The programme's first presenter was the Radio 1 DJ Ed Stewart, who was then succeeded by Laurie Mayer and Richard Skinner less than a year later.

Although unconfirmed by the BBC, it is widely thought that the name "Newsbeat" was taken from the Radio Caroline news service of the same name, as was the concept of short bulletins on the half-hour. Caroline first used the name (and broadcast half-hourly headlines) in the 1960s. Roger Gale, who had previously worked on Radio Caroline North, was one of the show's first producers. The launch editor was Mike Chaney.

Until 1995, the Newsbeat brand was only used for the 15-minute lunchtime and teatime bulletins as all other news bulletins, which were always broadcast at half-past the hour, were branded as Radio 1 News. Also, for the first four years of the 1990s, Newsbeat was only broadcast at lunchtime as the evening bulletin was a 30-minute programme called News 90/91/92/93 and for the first week of 1994 until the schedule changes, News 94, as the teatime edition of Newsbeat was then reinstated.

Following changes in September 2012, the vast majority of Newsbeat bulletins are simulcast on both BBC Radio 1 and 1Xtra. Previously, bulletins on 1Xtra were bespoke and branded as 1Xtra News, with bulletins on the half-hour (as with Newsbeat), but with 15-minute programmes at 12:30 and 17:30, 15 minutes before the Radio 1 equivalents. Each station continues to have bespoke bulletins during the weekday breakfast show, before shared bulletins begin at 10:30.

Newsbeat won Gold for Best News & Current Affairs Programme at the Radio Academy Awards on 13 May 2013.

In February 2014 it was reported that the BBC World Service would pilot a global edition of Newsbeat, a bulletin on the station aimed at younger listeners.

Newsbeat's The Story of Izzy Dix was named Podcast of the Year at the UK ARIAS 2016. Newsbeat also won Best News Coverage at the awards in 2021.

In 2021, it was announced Newsbeat would relocate to Birmingham, signalling the departure of many on-air staff and editor Debbie Ramsay. The move took place in the autumn of 2022.

== Bulletins ==
Newsbeat bulletins are broadcast on Radio 1, 1Xtra and the Asian Network, which started sharing Newsbeat output when the BBC streamlined news during the COVID-19 pandemic. As well as bulletins, Newsbeat broadcasts 15-minute programmes at 12:45 and 17:45 on weekdays.

These have been simulcast since September 2012 following budget cuts. Prior to this, weekend news bulletins had been simulcast. Additionally, at this time, the number of bulletins was reduced, with the 04:30 and 05:30 bulletins during the Early Breakfast show on weekdays being dropped. There also used to be bulletins at midnight, which were stopped at some point prior to this. They are read by one newsreader, but in the past there would be a newsreader and a sport reader during breakfast and drivetime bulletins on weekdays and breakfast bulletins at weekends. Bulletins are usually 2–3 minutes in length, and feature news and some sports stories, and weather during the breakfast show bulletins.

Updates consist of news and sport. The 13:30 bulletin is read by a different newsreader each day due to the main newsreader being on lunch at that time. Bulletins are hourly at weekends with one newsreader working throughout the day.

There was also an entertainment news round up at approximately 07:40 and 09:40 during The Radio 1 Breakfast Show with Nick Grimshaw, often hosted by Sinead Garvan. This continued when Grimshaw moved to drivetime, with one bulletin at 16:40. Entertainment news slots at 12:00 during Jo Whiley's weekday mid-morning, later Fearne Cotton's mid-morning show, and at 18:30 during Greg James' show, were dropped in 2015.

Until March 2020, individual breakfast bulletins used to be broadcast to each station. Since 2020 the bulletins have been simulcast from 06:30 to 17:45. The 06:30 bulletin has been broadcast across Radio 1, 1Xtra and the Asian Network since 2020, having previously been broadcast on Radio 1 only.

In November 2017, the 16:30 bulletin on weekdays was shortened and the 17:00 bulletin dropped. In addition, the 22:00 bulletin was brought forward to 21:00, and the 16:30 and 17:30 bulletins on Saturdays were also dropped. The 21:00 bulletin was dropped in 2020 due to the COVID-19 pandemic.

From October 2021 to May 2025, the afternoon Newsbeat was dropped from BBC Asian Network on Monday to Thursday afternoons. Three-minute bulletins were broadcast each half-hour from 15:00 to 17:57 and was hosted by a different presenter to BBC Radio 1 and 1Xtra. However on Friday afternoons, it continued broadcasting the network Newsbeat bulletins at 15:30 and 16:30, plus the full 17:45 programme.

In October 2024, Newsbeat started changing timestamps for its weekday bulletins; breakfast headlines were read for two minutes instead of three, whilst the rest of the day saw bulletins read for three minutes instead of two. There was no change for weekends and bank holidays, as bulletins continue to be read for two minutes per hour. The current bulletin times are as follows:

Weekdays	Weekends
06:30	
06:58	
07:30	07:30
08:00	
08:30	08:30
09:30	09:30
10:30	10:30
11:30	11:30
12:45	12:30
13:30	13:30
14:30	14:30
15:30	15:30
16:30	
17:45	

Bank holidays follow a weekend bulletin schedule. Weekdays during the Christmas and New Year period follow a weekend bulletin schedule with the addition of bulletins at 16:30 and 17:30. Bulletins on Christmas Day are hourly from (7:30 to 10:30 on 1xrta and Asian network only)08:30 to 10:30.

== Location ==
In keeping with its specific targeting of young audiences, Newsbeat had its own set of reporters and studios based at Radio 1 in Broadcasting House in London. Since 2022, the programme is based at The Mailbox in Birmingham, as part of the BBC's effort to move some of its services away from London.

Many of the stories produced by Newsbeat are reported by other programmes across BBC News.

== Staff ==
=== Editors ===
- Danielle Dwyer (Editor)
- Ben Mundy (Deputy Editor)
- Mitch Mansfield (Assistant Editor)
- Sonal Patel (Assistant Editor)

=== Main presenters ===
- Calum Leslie (Breakfast newsreader)
- Jordan Kenny and Pete Allison (Afternoon newsreader and programme presenter)

=== Journalists ===
- Pete Allison
- Polly Bayfield
- Shaun Dacosta
- Eleanor Doyle
- Jared Evitts
- Peter Gillibrand
- Jack Gray
- Jordan Kenny (Politics reporter)
- Julia Leonard
- Áine O'Donnell
- Mollie Perella
- Andrew Rogers
- Eleanor Shearwood

=== Online and digital reporters ===
- Riyah Collins
- Ian Murphy
- Manish Pandey
- Tom Richardson

Previous reporters and main presenters include Eleanor Oldroyd, Carolyn Atkinson, Claire Bradley, Tina Daheley, Claire Cavanagh, Dominic Byrne, Georgina Bowman, Anna Foster, Tulip Mazumdar, Sybil Ruscoe, Chris Smith, Declan Harvey, Ben Mundy, Daniel Rosney, Christian Hewgill and Sinead Garvan.

Previous sports reporters include Arlo White, Andy May, Simon Mundie, Mark Chapman, David Garrido, Juliette Ferrington, Tina Daheley and Carrie Davis.

There is a long-running tradition of the DJ on air at the time chatting to the newsreader following their bulletin. Chris Moyles often shamelessly flirted with the female newsreaders for bad comic effect, and built up a good on-air relationship with afternoon newsreader Dominic Byrne, who later went on to join him on the Radio 1 and Radio X breakfast shows. Greg James also built a good relationship with Chris Smith through chatting following news bulletins.

== Editors ==
Danielle Dwyer was appointed editor of Newsbeat in October 2021. She oversaw the programme's move from London to Birmingham in Autumn 2022. The Newsbeat editor also oversees BBC Asian Network news, as well as all Newsbeat output across BBC Radio 1, 1Xtra, BBC iPlayer and online.

Debbie Ramsay was Newsbeat's previous editor. She left Newsbeat in 2021 having been in charge since 2016. Newsbeat's executive editor was former daytime editor of BBC Radio 5 Live and editor of the Victoria Derbyshire programme on BBC Two and the BBC News Channel, Louisa Compton, until 2018.

Rod McKenzie, himself was a former presenter of the programme and the news presenter on the Simon Mayo Breakfast Show on Radio 1 from 1988 to 1993, and was an editor until 2014, when he was dismissed from the station and moved to another position job within the BBC after bullying allegations.

Newsbeat's first editor was Mike Chaney – hired from The Sun by the Director-General to inject a populist flavour to the news coverage of Radio 1.

== Imaging ==
Newsbeat is notable for the distinctive musical imaging it has used for most of its history. At first, this was a just jingle at the beginning of the bulletin, but in the late 1990s this expanded to music throughout. There are different beds for news, sport and weather. The news imaging used to be changed every year, but this changed to every two years in 2005, and the most recent imaging package was on air from 2017–2022.

On air	Produced by	Tagline
Jan 1998 – Dec 1998	Vibe Music Audio Imaging	97-99FM Radio 1 – Newsbeat
Jan 1999 – Dec 1999	Vibe Music Audio Imaging	97-99FM Radio 1 – Newsbeat
Jan 2000 – Feb 2001	Vibe Music Audio Imaging	Newsbeat
Feb 2001 – Jan 2002	Vibe Music Audio Imaging	Radio 1 – Newsbeat
Jan 2002 – Jan 2003	Vibe Music Audio Imaging	Radio 1 – Newsbeat
Jan 2003 – Jan 2004	David Lowe	Radio 1 – Newsbeat
Jan 2004 – July 2004	David Lowe / Radio 1 in house production	BBC Radio 1 Newsbeat
August 2004 – January 2005	David Lowe / Radio 1 in house production	BBC Radio 1 Newsbeat
January 2005 – December 2006	Music4	Radio 1 Newsbeat
January 2007 – January 2009	Music4	Digital, FM, Online – This is Radio 1
January 2009 – June 2011	Music4 / Radio 1 in house production	Digital, FM, Online – This is BBC Radio 1
June 2011 – January 2015	Koink	Listen, Watch, Share – This is BBC Radio 1/1Xtra (as appropriate)
January 2015 – June 2017	Daniel Mumford Music	This is BBC Radio 1/1Xtra (as appropriate)
June 2017 – May 2022	Daniel Mumford / Radio 1 in house production	1/1Xtra/Asian Network (as appropriate)
May 2022 – present	Wisebuddah	Radio 1/1Xtra/Asian Network Newsbeat (as appropriate)

== Newsbeat's Oddbox ==
In 2007, Newsbeat's Oddbox was launched. A four-minute video which looked at the week's strangest news, it was presented by Dominic Byrne, with Tulip Mazumdar or Natalie Jamieson covering when Byrne was unavailable. Old episodes are available to watch at BBC Online, on the BBC Red Button and on the BBC News channel. The last episode of Oddbox was released on 14 September 2012 due to Byrne's departure from Radio 1.

== Newsbeat Documentaries ==
In 2015, Newsbeat Documentaries was launched, consisting in in-depth investigations on various subjects, like social and political themes, and broadcast by Radio 1, 1Xtra and BBC News.

== Parody ==
Satirist and broadcaster Christopher Morris parodied the 1990s presentational style of Newsbeat as "Radio 1 Newsbanger". Some of these parodies were actually broadcast on Radio 1, though most featured in the Radio 4 comedy series On the Hour.

In 1997, Morris further parodied Newsbeat by rearranging sentences of existing Newsbeat broadcasts to create nonsensical and blackly comic headlines, as part of a one-off segment on Blue Jam. Unlike On the Hour, Blue Jam was broadcast on Radio 1.
