= Greg James =

British author, broadcaster, comedian, and presenter (born 1985)

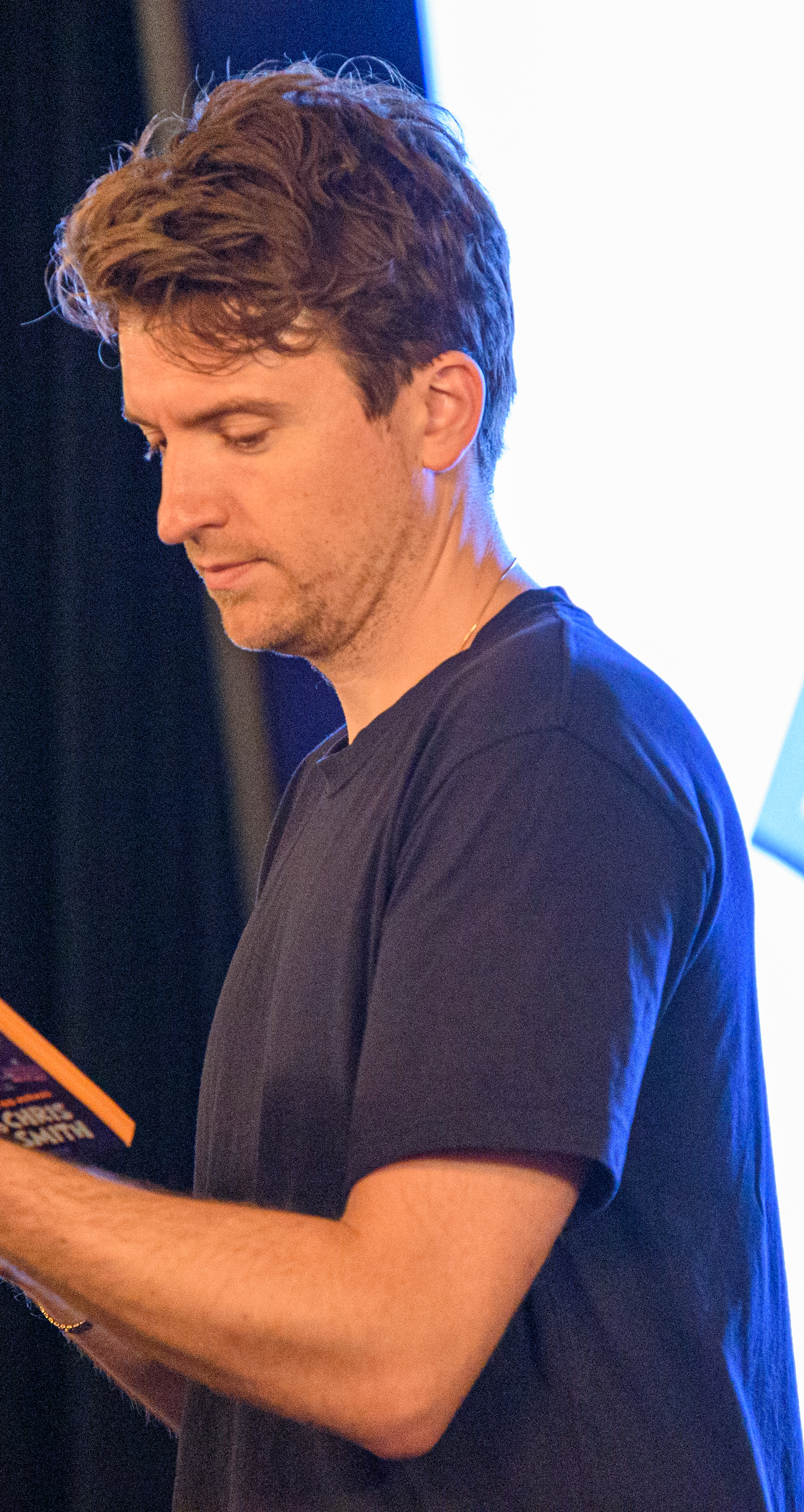
- James in 2022
- Born: Gregory James Alan Milward; 17 December 1985 (age 40); Lewisham, London, England
- Education: University of East Anglia
- Occupations: Author; broadcaster; presenter
- Years active: 2000–present
- Employer: BBC
- Known for: Radio 1 Breakfast with Greg James
- Spouse: Bella Mackie (m. 2018)
- Relatives: Alan Rusbridger (father-in-law)

Gregory James Alan Milward (born 17 December 1985), known professionally as Greg James, is a British radio DJ, television presenter and author. He has been a presenter on BBC Radio 1 since 2007, and has hosted the station's flagship breakfast show since 2018. Before then, he presented its drive-time show.

Since 2017, James has co-hosted the BBC's cricket podcast Tailenders alongside the England cricketer James Anderson and guitarist for the Maccabees, Felix White. He is also a children's author, most notable for the Kid Normal book series with Chris Smith.

== Early life ==
Gregory James Alan Milward was born to Alan and Rosemary Milward on 17 December 1985 in Lewisham, South London. His parents were both teachers; his father a headteacher, and his mother a special-needs teacher. He has a sister, Catherine. As a baby, he almost died, having to have three blood transfusions due to a rare blood disorder.

James attended four schools as a child, moving around a lot due to his father's headteacher job. He studied drama at the University of East Anglia in Norwich. At university, he lived with comedians John Kearns and Pat Cahill.

At age 14, after repeatedly asking his local hospital radio station, James was given a show; however, he later discovered that the transmitter was broken, so none of his shows actually went out. James previously played cricket for Hertfordshire Under-18s.

== Career ==
=== Radio ===
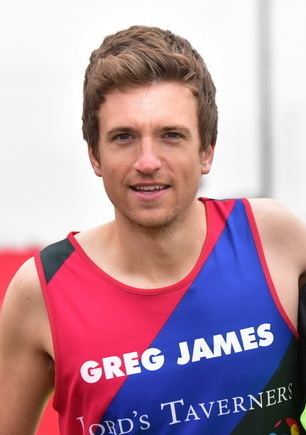
James at the 2015 London Marathon

Whilst at university, he presented several shows on the students' union radio station Livewire 1350AM, becoming the station manager in 2006, though he said it was a job he did not enjoy. He later said that he "owe[d] that place basically everything" when returning to visit the station in 2025. He also presented several breakfast shows on Future Radio in Norwich and on Pulse Rated, Salhouse before he got his break at BBC Radio 1. He won 'Best Male Presenter' at the Student Radio Awards 2005. During university holidays he presented stints on Capital North East (then Galaxy North East).

James joined BBC Radio 1 in June 2007 to present the Early Breakfast Show on Fridays and to provide cover for other presenters, including Sara Cox and Vernon Kay. He first presented the show on 1 June 2007, the day after graduating from university. In October, he was appointed as the full-time presenter of the Early Breakfast Show, which aired from 04:30 to 07:00 before being rescheduled to 04:00 to 06:30. His first full-time show was broadcast on 1 October, and his inaugural Record of the Week was "Hometown Glory" by Adele.

On 21 September 2009, BBC Radio 1 introduced a new schedule in which James moved to the early afternoon slot from 13:00 to 16:00, replacing Edith Bowman, who moved to the weekend breakfast slot.

From March 2010 to January 2013, James presented The Official Chart Update on Wednesday afternoons, initially from 15:30 to 16:00 and later from 16:00 to 16:30 after moving to the drivetime slot Scott Mills succeeded him as presenter at the original 15:30 time.

Between 2011 and 2015, James also co-hosted Not Just Cricket on 5 Live with England cricketers Graeme Swann and James Anderson. The show's main focus was cricket, but topics were varied.

He also hosted a weekly podcast That's What He Said with former BBC Radio 1 Newsbeat presenter Chris Smith. The podcast ended when James began presenting the Radio 1 Breakfast Show.

On 16 February 2013, James guest presented the BBC Radio 5 Live comedy sports programme Fighting Talk, standing in for Colin Murray.

On 15 November 2017, James along with Felix White, Jimmy Anderson, renewed producer Mark 'Sharky' Sharman (AKA Sharknado the Movie) and regular input from Bristolian Matt ‘Mattchin’ Horan began hosting a cricketing podcast Tailenders. This was initially a weekly podcast covering the 2017–18 Ashes series, but from 23 May 2018 it was renewed to continue on a 'weekly' basis. Features include 'General Cricketing Sadness', 'Mattchin's Quiz' and 'Black Wednesday/Xmas Show/App Launch'.

Since 2019, James has also presented the BBC Radio 4 series Rewinder, a show where he digs through the BBC archives to find classic material to reflect on current stories of the week.

In February 2023, James launched Formula 1 podcast The Fast And The Curious alongside former Radio 1 Newsbeat presenter Christian Hewgill and BBC Sport broadcaster Betty Glover.

=== Drivetime ===
On 28 February 2012, it was announced that James and Scott Mills would swap shows from 2 April, with James taking over the Drivetime Show from 16:00 to 19:00. Regular features during his tenure included "The 10 Minute Takeover" (Monday to Thursday at 18:00), "Impossible Karaoke", "Rage against the Answer Machine", "Mayor of Where", "Ask The Nation", "Wrong Uns", "What's My Age Again" (prior to The Official Chart moving to Fridays), celebrity guests on Thursdays and film reviews with critic Ali Plumb. The show also featured improvised games with Chris Smith, the main afternoon Newsbeat reader.

James occasionally presented the show from outside the studio, including a week broadcasting from the BFBS radio studio in Camp Bastion, Afghanistan, and hosting "G In the Park", a mini-music festival from the BBC in Glasgow prior to the T in the Park festival.

Following the change to the global release date for new music, from 10 July 2015, his Friday show was replaced between 16:00 and 17:45 by The Official Chart, followed by Dance Anthems from 18:00 to 19:00. The drivetime slot was typically divided into two segments, with a fifteen-minute break between 17:45 and 18:00 for the evening Newsbeat bulletin.

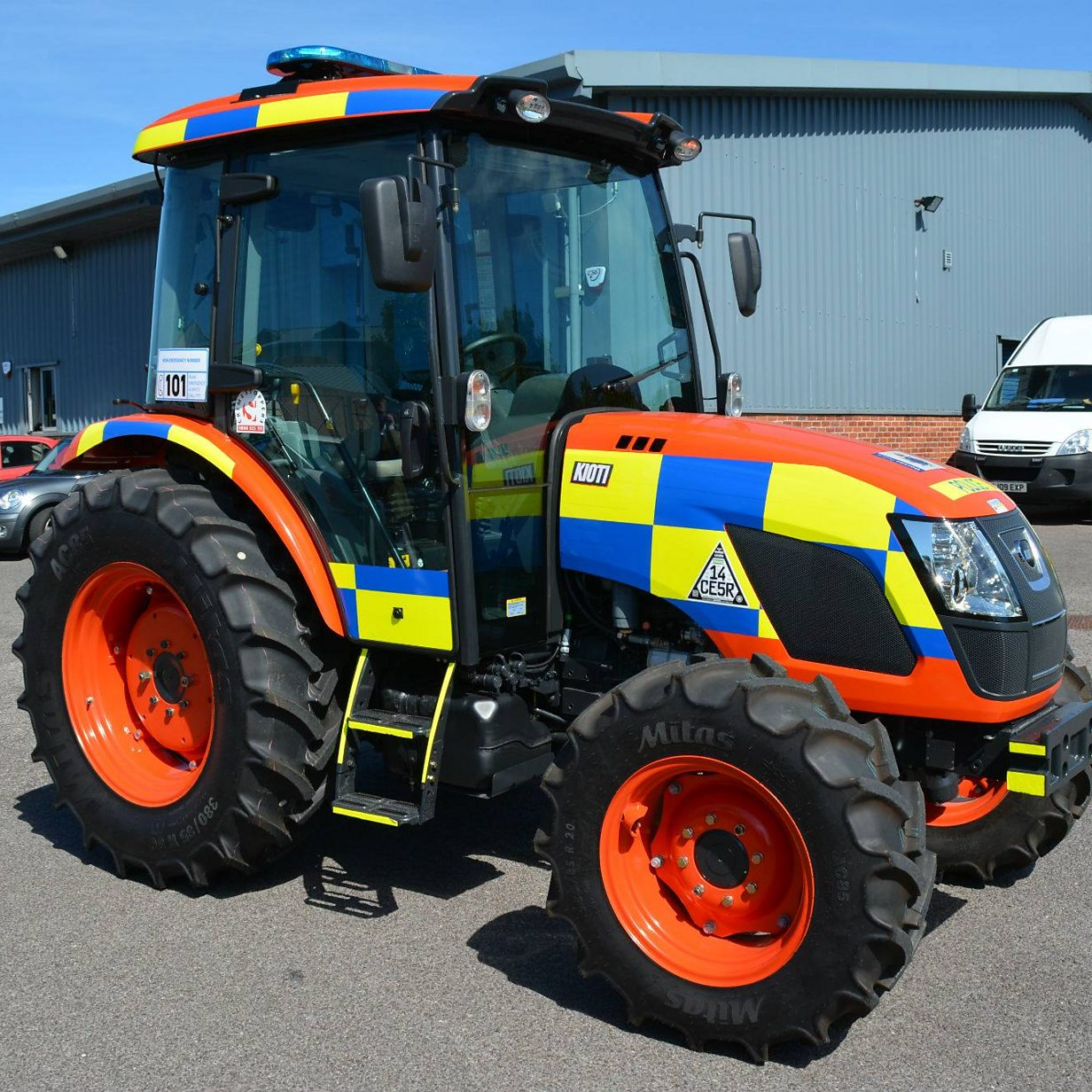
The Dorset Police tractor 'Robocrop', named by Greg James

On 19 June 2017, James chose the name "RoboCrop" from "thousands and thousands" of listeners' suggestions for a tractor on loan to Dorset Police to tour agricultural shows to raise awareness of rural crime. Dorset Police said the tractor, equipped with a siren, had a top speed of 23 mph (37 km/h) and was "not built for response policing".

=== Radio 1 Breakfast ===
On 20 August 2018, James took over Radio 1 Breakfast from Nick Grimshaw. The pair switched shows, with Grimshaw taking on the Drivetime show between 16:00–19:00. It was announced by the two presenters on Grimshaw's Breakfast Show on 31 May, with Grimshaw joking "It's time for a change, time for a new show and, most importantly, it's going to be time for a new wake-up time... preferably around 11:30 am". Both presenters were very excited about the change, with James saying that taking over would be a "big challenge" but he was ready and willing "to give it a go". His first guest on the show was Wallace the Lion from Blackpool Zoo. The show was broadcast four days a week, until December 2020 when the BBC announced changes to the Radio 1 schedule, with James' Breakfast Show now being five days a week, whilst Matt Edmondson and Mollie King moved from the weekend breakfast show to the weekend afternoon slot.

=== Television ===
James is also a TV presenter. In 2009, he presented a TV show for BBC Three called Sun, Sex and Holiday Madness, about British tourists in Magaluf and Young, Jobless and Living at Home, also for BBC Three. He has presented Sound on BBC Two's Switch and he hosted the backstage winners' podium at the 2009 BRIT Awards, which he did again in 2010.

In 2011, James had a non-speaking cameo role in the Doctor Who episode "Closing Time".

James presented the BBC Three's coverage of Glastonbury Festival 2011 and in August 2012, the Reading and Leeds Festival (both with Fearne Cotton). He presented coverage of T in the Park 2012, alongside Edith Bowman in July. In 2013, James co-presented extensive coverage of Radio 1's Big Weekend on BBC Three with Alice Levine. In June 2013, James once again hosted BBC Three's coverage of Glastonbury, alongside Gemma Cairney.

He again hosted the BBC's coverage of festivals including Radio 1's Big Weekend, T in The Park, Reading, and Glastonbury in the summer of 2014.

In 2012, James co-presented two series of Unzipped (originally named Britain Unzipped) on BBC Three with Russell Kane and later How to Win Eurovision, a special two-hour show, on 11 May 2013. In December 2012, James and Gabby Logan presented 50 Greatest London 2012 Olympics Moments on BBC Three. The show was broadcast on his 27th birthday.

On 25 September 2013, James along with Kane starred in their chat show Staying in with Greg and Russell on BBC Three. Both later appeared on the Children in Need 2013 appeal night during a Lip Sync Challenge, which James won by performing "Circle of Life" from The Lion King.

In 2014, James appeared as a contestant in the CBeebies gameshow Swashbuckle with his niece Pia.

In September 2014, James hosted the closing ceremony of The Invictus Games with Clare Balding live on BBC Two. In 2015, he presented the BBC Three reality game show I Survived a Zombie Apocalypse.

In May 2015, he played a police officer in the BBC Three comedy murder mystery series Murder in Successville. Also in 2015, James co-wrote and starred in the Comedy Feeds episode Dead Air.

In March 2016, he hosted a segment of the Sport Relief telethon with Alesha Dixon. James has guest presented several episodes of The One Show.

In November 2016, James co-presented the BBC's Children in Need appeal for the first time. He also presented the Children in Need Rocks for Terry concert at the Royal Albert Hall with Fearne Cotton.

Between 2016 and 2017, Greg presented BT Sport's cricket coverage of the South Africa tour to Australia.

In 2017 and 2018, he co-presented the primetime BBC One music show Sounds Like Friday Night with A.Dot. The show wasn't renewed for a third series.

In 2022, James became an executive producer for the Sky documentary series The Man Who Bought Cricket, focusing on billionaire and fraudster Allen Stanford. It was based on a BBC Sounds podcast presented by James on the same subject, in a series called Sport's Strangest Crimes.

In March 2023, Channel 4 announced that James would be the host of its new reality show Rise and Fall.

On 16 June 2023, he appeared as himself in Episode 1 of the BBC One comedy Queen of Oz. James is seen and heard on his radio programme questioning the outrageous antics of spoiled spare to the British crown, Princess Georgiana, played by Catherine Tate.

=== Kid Normal ===
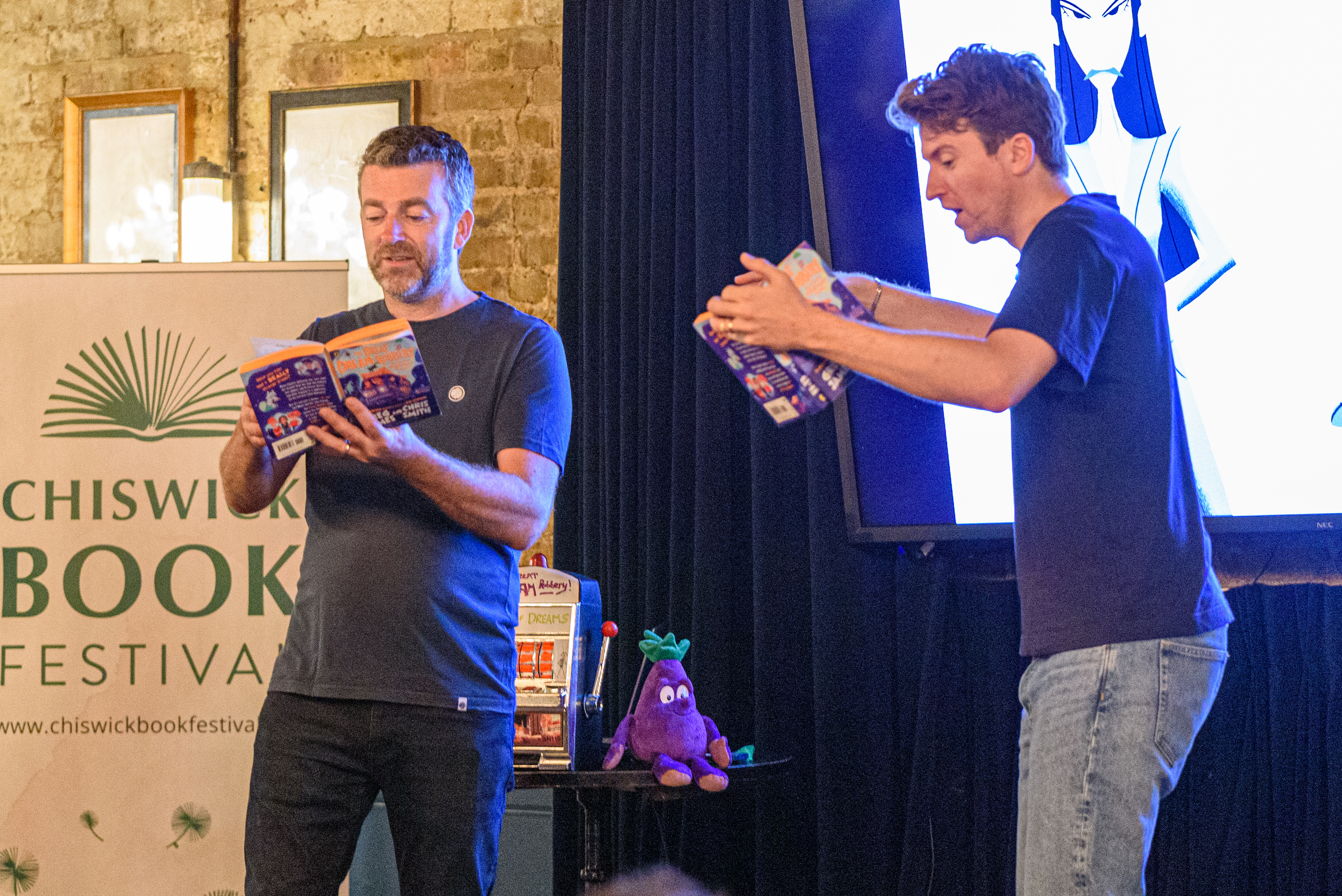
James and Chris Smith at the 2022 Chiswick Book Festival

Together with newsreader Chris Smith, James wrote the children's book series Kid Normal which is a 6-book series about a normal boy in a superhero world. The first one was published by Bloomsbury and released on 13 July 2017 in the UK and the second one the following March. The first book was the biggest selling children's debut of the year and have sold over 100,000 copies combined. The books have also been released in 19 other languages around the world.

== Charity work ==
In January 2013, along with Jack Dee, Melanie C, Dara Ó Briain, Philips Idowu and Chelsee Healey, James took part in Comic Relief: Through Hell and High Water. They journeyed along the Zambezi River for 5 days raising money to build a new school in the region. They raised well over £1 million for the charity.

On 2 March 2013, James appeared on the Let's Dance for Comic Relief judging panel alongside Arlene Phillips and Lee Mack.

In 2014, James was part of 'Team Coe' in the Sport Relief: Clash of the Titans. His team won the competition held at the Queen Elizabeth Olympic Park. He took part in the cycling, synchronized swimming and swimming relay.

In February 2015, he, Chris Smith, Yasmin Evans and Alex Jones traveled to Uganda to take part in Operation Health. There, they helped to rebuild the Iyolwa Health Centre in Eastern Uganda, using money raised by Comic Relief. He blogged about it here. In total, the Radio 1 audience raised £551,405.

In February 2016, for Sport Relief, James underwent the tough challenge, dubbed the 'Gregathlon', of completing five Triathlons in 5 days, in 5 different cities across the UK, hosting his Drivetime Radio 1 show after completing his daily Triathlon, raising £1 million for charity.

In February 2018, James undertook his second Gregathlon for Sport Relief: Pedal to the Peaks. He cycled over 500 miles (800 km) and climbed Snowdon and Scafell Pike before the challenge had to be postponed because extreme weather conditions caused by the Beast from the East. He returned to complete the challenge and climbed Ben Nevis on 16 March 2018, raising over £1 million.

In March 2026, James embarked on his third solo Comic Relief challenge. The challenge to ride 1000km across the UK on a tandem started in Weymouth on 13 March, and finished in Edinburgh on 20 March. On 16 March, The Hunter Foundation pledged to match all donations (up to £1 million).

== Personal life ==
On 1 June 2018, James announced his engagement to his girlfriend Bella Mackie, the daughter of former newspaper editor Alan Rusbridger, she is the author of the bestselling dark novel How to Kill Your Family. They married in September of the same year. They live in Kentish Town, an area of north London. and he drives a manual, thirty-year old Renault Espace. On 3 August 2026, James announced that Barney, a labrador dog that he adopted with Mackie from Battersea Dogs & Cats Home, had died after a series of illnesses.

James is godfather to Ruby, the youngest daughter of England cricketer James Anderson.

He is a keen cricket fan, and used to play for Hertfordshire Under-18s. He is a supporter of Bath Rugby and Arsenal.

He is an ambassador for two charities; The Stroke Association and The Lord's Taverners. He also took part in the 2012 NHS Team Give Blood campaign, representing O+.

== Awards ==
- 2005 – Student Radio Award for 'Best Male Presenter'
- 2013 – 'Loaded Lafta' for 'Funniest Radio Show'
- 2013 – Silver Sony Radio Academy Award for 'Best Entertainment Show'
- 2014 – Gold Radio Academy Award for 'Best Entertainment Show'
- 2016 – Gold Radio Academy 'ARIA' Award for 'Best Entertainment Production'
- 2020 – Arias Award for 'Best New Show'
- 2020 – Arias Award for 'Best marketing campaign'
- 2020 – TRIC awards for " Radio Personality"

In July 2025 The University of York announced James as an Honorary Degree recipient.

== Filmography ==
Television
Year	Title	Role	Notes
2008, 2018–2019	BBC Radio 1 Teen Awards	Co-presenter	Annually
2009	Merlin: Secrets and Magic	Narrator	
2009	Sun, Sex and Suspicious Parents	Presenter	
2010	Louis Walsh & Kian Egan's Next Big Thing - Wonderland	Narrator	2 episodes
2011	Young, Jobless and Living at Home	Presenter	
2011–present	Glastonbury Festival	Co-presenter	
2012	Unzipped	Co-presenter	2 series
2012	50 Greatest London 2012 Olympics Moments	Co-presenter	
2013	How to Win Eurovision	Co-presenter	
2013	Let's Sing and Dance	Panellist	
2013	Staying in with Greg and Russell	Co-presenter	
2013–present	BBC Radio 1's Big Weekend	Co-presenter	
2014	Commonwealth Games	Commentator	
2014	The Invictus Games: Closing Ceremony	Presenter	
2014	Swashbuckle	Contestant	
2014–2015	New Year Live	Co-presenter	
2015	I Survived a Zombie Apocalypse	Presenter	
2016	Sport Relief	Co-presenter	
2016	Children in Need Rocks for Terry	Co-presenter	with Fearne Cotton
2016	Children in Need	Co-presenter	with Tess Daly
2016–2017	BT Sport Cricket	Presenter	
2016–2019	Most Ridiculous	Narrator	
2016–2021	The One Show	Guest co-presenter	
2017	The Playlist	Starring	
2017–2018	Sounds Like Friday Night	Co-presenter	2 series
2018–2019	CBeebies Bedtime Story	Storyteller	2 episodes
2019	The Great Travel Hack	Co-presenter	2 series
2020	Greg James' Sport Relief Heroes	Presenter	
2020	Work on the Wild Side	Narrator	20 episodes
2021	Team GB Olympics: Homecoming Concert	Co-presenter	One-off special
2022	The Man Who Bought Cricket	Executive producer	Documentary mini-series
2023	Taskmaster	Panellist	New Years treat episode
2023	Rise & Fall	Presenter	1 series
2023	Sports Funniest 2023 with Greg James	Presenter	One-off comedy show
2023	Supertato	Sprouty Claus	Christmas special
2024	The Unofficial Science Of Indiana Jones	Co-presenter	

Acting roles
Year	Title	Role
2011	Doctor Who	Man in Lingerie Department (uncredited)
2015	The Bad Education Movie	Himself
2023	Queen of Oz	Himself

Radio
Year	Station	Show
2007–2009	BBC Radio 1	Early Breakfast
2009–2012	BBC Radio 1	Afternoons
2012–2018	BBC Radio 1	Drivetime
2015–2018	BBC Radio 1	The Official Chart with Greg James
2018—present	BBC Radio 1	Radio 1 Breakfast with Greg James
2017—present	BBC Radio 5 Live	Tailenders
2019—present	BBC Radio 4	Rewinder

=== Guest appearances ===
- The Gadget Show (2009)
- The Wright Stuff (2011)
- South Today (2012)
- Celebrity Juice (2012, 2013)
- What's Cooking? (2013)
- 50 Funniest Moments of 2013 (2013)
- The Apprentice: You're Fired! (2014, 2015)
- BBC Radio 1 Teen Awards (2014)
- Pointless Celebrities (2015)
- The 15 Second Interview with Joe Lycett (2015)
- BBC Music Awards (2015)
- Frank Skinner on Demand with... (2015)
- Murder In Successville (2015)
- Drunk History (2016)
- Room 101 (2016)
- Lorraine (2016, 2017, 2018, 2019)
- Weekend (2017)
- Victoria Derbyshire (2017)
- Saturday Kitchen (2017, 2020)
- Saturday Mash-Up! (2017)
- The One Show (2017, 2020, 2021)
- Zoe Ball On... (2018)
- BBC Breakfast (2018, 2019)
- This Morning (2018, 2019, 2022)
- The Sara Cox Show (2019)
- Would I Lie to You? (2019)
- Loose Women (2019)
- Ant & Dec's Saturday Night Takeaway (2020, 2022)
- Sport Relief (2020)
- The Big Night In (2020)
- Great British Menu (2020)
- Michael Palin: Travels of a Lifetime (2020)
- Morning Live (2020)
- Strictly Come Dancing (2020)
- ITV News Central (2021)
- Between the Covers (2021)
- The Great Garden Revolution (2022)
- Celebrity Masterchef (2022)
- QI (2022)
- Saturday Kitchen (2023)

Media offices
Preceded by Clara Amfo	BBC Radio 1 Chart Show Presenter; 10 July 2015–8 June 2018	Succeeded by Scott Mills
Preceded by Nick Grimshaw	BBC Radio 1 Breakfast Show Presenter; 2018–present	Succeeded by Incumbent
