= Access Entertainment =

Entertainment investment company

- Logo used since 2023
- Type: Subsidiary
- Industry: Entertainment
- Founded: May 2016; 10 years ago
- Founders: Len Blavatnik; Danny Cohen
- Headquarters: London, England, United Kingdom
- Area served: Worldwide
- Key people: Danny Cohen (president)
- Services: Film and TV finance; Private equity; Theatre producer
- Parent: Access Industries
- Website: accessentertainmentmedia.com

Access Entertainment is a British investment company that specializes in funding production companies, as well as projects in film, television, theatre, and digital media. The company, co-founded and led by Danny Cohen, is a division of Access Industries, a multinational industrialist group owned by Len Blavatnik. Notable films financed include the A24's Beau Is Afraid, The Zone of Interest, The Iron Claw, (all 2023) and Focus Features' Conclave (2024). In 2026 the company co-founded Fireside Access TV to fund and co-produce TV content.

== History ==
In late 2015, senior executive Danny Cohen in charge of television output for BBC Television left the company and joined Len Blavatnik's Access Industries. Cohen founded Access Entertainment in May 2016 to invest in the entertainment sector focusing on television and film dramas. By August 2016, Access obtained a first-look deal to develop and finance feature films from Tessa Ross and Juliette Howell's newly formed indie production company, House Productions.

In October 2016, the company entered into a $61.3 million investment deal with BBC Worldwide, allowing scripted shows greenlit by Access to be sold to international markets. In January 2017, Access, BBC Worldwide and Lookout Point jointly founded Benchmark Television, enabling producers to have their television series greenlit without the backing of a network or platform.

In March 2017, Access bought a 24.9% stake in British television production company Bad Wolf. Later in 2021, Sony Pictures Television took a majority stake in Bad Wolf for a reportedly $80 million, acquiring Access's minority shares. In April 2017, Access acquired James Packer's controlling stake in his and Brett Ratner's RatPac Entertainment company, which gave ownership of RatPac's film, television and documentary business, along with the deal of RatPac-Dune Entertainment venture to co-finance films for Warner Bros. Pictures. A year later, Warner Bros. bought RatPac-Dune Entertainments' film catalogue and its operations.

In 2023, Access began investing in A24 films. In June 2023, Access invested in A24's Euphoria makeup artist Donni Davy's beauty brand Half Magic, inspired from styles popularized by the series . As of March 2025, Access and Warner Bros. Discovery collectively hold a 26% stake in Israeli broadcaster Reshet 13.

=== Fireside Access TV ===
In April 2026, Toby Emmerich, former head of Warner Bros. Pictures, said in an interview that he was shifting his focus to television, expanding his production company Fireside Films into TV development and forming a partnership with Access. Emmerich and former Netflix executive producer Amanda Krentzman formed Fireside Access TV, a production company backed by Access Entertainment that co-finances, developments and produces TV series. The company's first project to back was the 2025 Netflix documentary aka Charlie Sheen.

== Credits ==
=== Film ===
List of films
| Year | Title | Distributor | Executive produced | Gross | Ref(s) |
|---|---|---|---|---|---|
| 2018 | The 15:17 to Paris | Warner Bros. Pictures | No | $57.1 million | |
| 2018 | Rampage | Warner Bros. Pictures | No | $428 million | |
| 2021 | Zack Snyder's Justice League | HBO Max | No | —N/a | |
| 2023 | Beau Is Afraid | A24 | Yes | $12.3 million | |
| 2023 | The Zone of Interest | A24 | Yes | $52.8 million | |
| 2023 | The Iron Claw | A24 | Yes | $45.2 million | |
| 2023 | A Kind of Kidnapping | Bulldog Film Distribution | Cohen only | —N/a | |
| 2024 | MaXXXine | A24 | Yes | $22.1 million | |
| 2024 | Bird | Mubi | Yes | $1.9 million | |
| 2024 | Conclave | Focus Features | Yes | $127.6 million | |
| 2024 | Starve Acre | Brainstorm Media | Yes | $160,498 (limited) | |
| 2025 | The Last Musician of Auschwitz | Cosmic Cat Films | Yes | —N/a | |
| 2025 | The Legend of Ochi | A24 | Yes | $3.7 million | |
| 2025 | Materialists | A24 | Yes | $106.5 million | |
| 2025 | Eddington | A24 | Yes | $13.1 million | |
| 2026 | The Deb | Rialto Distribution | Yes (Note: Blavatnik produced through AI Film, while Cohen executive produced through Access.) | $239,640 | |
| 2026 | Mother Mary | A24 | Yes | $3.1 million | |

==== Upcoming ====
List of upcoming films
| Year | Title | Distributor | Executive produced | Ref(s) |
|---|---|---|---|---|
| 2026 | Our Loves | TBA | Cohen produced under Access | |
| 2026 | Young Stalin | TBA | Yes | |
| TBD | Sweetsick | Searchlight Pictures | Yes | |

=== Television ===
- Red Skies (2023; Reshet 13)

=== Theatre ===
- A View from the Bridge (2024; Theatre Royal Haymarket)
- The Picture of Dorian Gray (2025; Broadway)
- The Deep Blue Sea (2025; Theatre Royal Haymarket)
- High Noon (2025–2026; Harold Pinter Theatre)
- Grace Pervades (2026; Theatre Royal Haymarket)
- Game of Thrones: The Mad King (2026; Royal Shakespeare Theatre)
