= Our Loves =

- Original film poster in Hebrew
- Hebrew: האהבות שלנו
- Directed by: Avi Nesher
- Written by: Avi Nesher
- Produced by: Danny Cohen; Leon Edery; Moshe Edery; Guilhad Emilio Schenker; Gideon Tadmor
- Starring: Hadas Yaron; Magi Azarzar; Lena Fraifeld; Amir Banai; Yaniv Biton; Noa Cohen
- Cinematography: Amit Yasur
- Edited by: Isaac Sehayek
- Music by: Neomi Aharoni Gal; Tom Oren
- Production companies: Access Entertainment; Fox Entertainment Studios; Moriah Media; Sipur Studios
- Distributed by: Fox Entertainment
- Release dates: 13 September 2026 (TIFF); 15 October 2026
- Country: Israel
- Languages: Hebrew; Arabic

Our Loves (Hebrew: האהבות שלנו) is a 2026 Israeli drama film written and directed by Avi Nesher. It deals with five Israeli men and women in the lead up to the October 7 attacks. The attacks deal a heavy blow to the men and women, and they must somehow rebuild their lives.

The film stars an ensemble cast with Hadas Yaron, Magi Azarzar, Evelin Hagoel, Lena Fraifeld, Amir Banai, Yaniv Biton and Noa Cohen.

It will have its world premiere at the Toronto International Film Festival on 13 September 2026. The film will be released in Israeli theatres on 15 October 2026.

== Plot summary ==
Five Israeli men and women find themselves in atypical and disjointed relationships leading up to the October 7 attacks.

Milly, a policewoman, hides her relationship with her pregnant female partner from her mother. Liri is caught up in the contentious divorce of her father.

Nicco is a security guard at the Nova Music Festival and Sapir, an attendee, is looking to get over her heartbreak at the festival after her boyfriend ended their relationship.

The October 7 attacks upend the lives of everyone, and they must all try and find ways to rebuild amid the devastation.

== Cast ==
- Magi Azarzar as Milly, a policewoman in a relationship with a woman
- Hadas Yaron as Sandra, the same-sex partner of Milly
- Evelin Hagoel as Milly's Orthodox Jewish mother
- Noa Cohen as Liri
- Shalom Michaelshvili as Shabi, Liri's father
- Yaniv Biton as Nicco, a security guard at the Nova music festival
- Amir Banai
- Daniel Gimpel
- Lena Fraifeld
- Hisham Sulliman
- Sean Mongoza
- Kim Or Azulay
- Lior Miller
- Elad Turgeman
- Nunu
- Nevo Katan
- Itamar Pinto

== Production ==
=== Pre-production ===
Nesher spoke to Variety about the personal impact of the October 7 attacks and his motivation to dramatise the events on the screen: "it shook Israelis in more ways than you can imagine, and it went on for days and days and days, so one couldn't step out of it. One was left paralyzed from the shock and sadness. I was faced with a similar sentiment six, seven years ago when I had a tragedy in my family that felt paralyzing and like we would never return back to normalcy. I lost my son, who was killed in a traffic accident. It was horrible. So, you're paralyzed and you want to do something to help out."

Nesher undertook research on five or six people in the midst of emotional turmoil, who all felt that October 6 was the worst day of their lives, without imagining what was to come on October 7. These people formed the basis of the narrative of the film, and the characters are based on these individuals.

=== Filming ===
The production team built a remote set, 30-40 kilometres from Tel Aviv to shoot the Nova Music Festival scenes and massacres. Filming was impacted by the conflict between Israel and Iran.

=== Financing ===
The film received financial support from the Paul E. Singer Foundation. It was also executive produced by Shari Redstone, Len Blavatnik, Emily Blavatnik, Fernando Szew, Jim Berk, Sheldon Rabinowitz, Michael Even and Chen Even.

== Release ==
The film will be released theatrically in Israel on 15 October 2026.

It is scheduled to receive its international premiere at the 2026 Toronto International Film Festival on 13 September 2026.

A number of smaller, private screenings have taken place, including the Writers Guild of America West in Los Angeles.

== Reception ==
The film has been nominated for 12 Ophir Awards, including Best Film.

Hannah Brown of The Jerusalem Post described it as a "a beautiful and moving film about ordinary people in extraordinary circumstances. It’s suspenseful, sad, and sometimes even funny, the kind of movie that can change the way you see the world – and yourself."
