= Vanacker =

Vanacker is a surname. Notable people with the surname include:

- Marek Vanacker (born 2006), Canadian ice hockey player
- Peter Vanacker (born 1966), Belgian-German business executive
