= Danny Cohen (media executive) =

British television executive (born 1974)

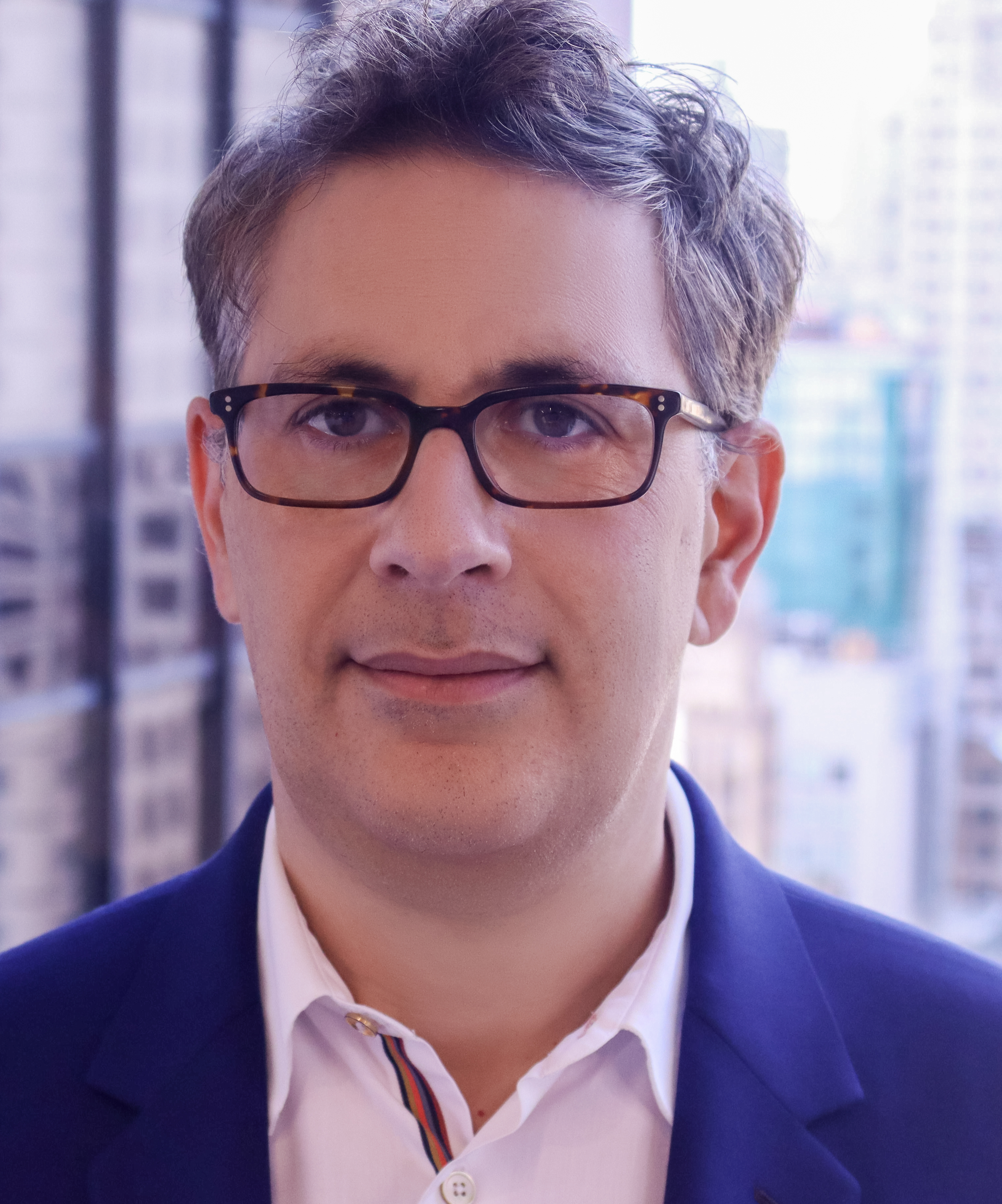
- Born: Daniel Nicholas Cohen; 15 January 1974 (age 52); Westminster, London, England
- Education: City of London School; Lady Margaret Hall, Oxford
- Occupation: Television executive
- Employer: Access Entertainment
- Known for: Former director of BBC Television
- Title: Controller of BBC Three (2007–2010); Controller of BBC One (2010–2013); Director of BBC Television (2013–2015); President of Access Entertainment (2016–present)
- Spouse: Noreena Hertz (m. 2012)

Daniel Nicholas Cohen (born 15 January 1974) is a British television executive. He is currently the president of Access Entertainment, and has previously served as the controller of BBC One and the director of BBC Television from 2013 to 2015.

== Early life and education ==
Cohen was born in Westminster, London. He attended Rosh Pinah, a Modern Orthodox Jewish primary school in Edgware, north London, followed by the City of London School. He read English literature at Lady Margaret Hall, Oxford, where he took a "double first".

== Career ==
=== Channel 4 ===
Between 2000 and 2007, Cohen worked at Channel 4 and its youth channel E4, including as Head of Documentaries for Channel 4 and Head of E4. His commissions included Skins, The Inbetweeners, Fonejacker, Supernanny and the documentary strand Cutting Edge.

=== BBC ===
Between May 2007 and October 2010, Cohen was the Controller of BBC Three. During his tenure, the channel won Digital Channel of the Year at the Edinburgh International TV Festival in 2008 and 2010. His commissions included Our War, the BAFTA-nominated Blood, Sweat and T-shirts, Britain's Missing Top Model, Stacey Dooley Investigates, and Being Human. He also acquired Summer Heights High from Australia, built a strong following for US animation Family Guy and revamped the hourly news bulletin 60 Seconds, adding a world news update.

As Controller of BBC One between 2010 and 2013, Cohen's commissions included Call The Midwife, Happy Valley, Peter Kay's Car Share, Poldark, The Casual Vacancy, The Voice, Last Tango in Halifax, Eat Well For Less, and The Missing. He led the channel's coverage of the 2012 London Olympics.

In May 2013, Cohen became Director of BBC Television, overseeing the BBC's television channels, BBC Productions, BBC Films and BBC iPlayer. BBC One's Q1 2015 prime-time audience share of 25.2% was its highest first quarter for a decade. In October 2015, he announced that he was leaving the BBC.

=== Access Entertainment ===
In May 2016, Cohen launched Access Entertainment with the businessman Len Blavatnik. The company, a division of Blavatnik's Access Industries, invests in content for theatre, film, television, gaming, the creator economy and the visual arts. It invested in the production company A24 and, alongside Blavatnik, Cohen has been executive producer on several of its films, including Beau is Afraid, The Iron Claw, the Oscar-winning The Zone of Interest and the Israeli film, Our Loves. The company has also invested in creator economy firm Spotter, the mobile game developer Tripledot Studios, and the arts centre, Lightroom.

=== The Telegraph ===
Since the October 7 attacks in Israel in 2023, Cohen has been a regular contributor to The Telegraph, attacking anti-Zionism, including accusing the BBC's coverage of the ensuing Gaza war of anti-Israel bias. He was one of 45 Jewish signatories on a letter demanding that the BBC take down its Gaza: How to Survive a Warzone documentary due to its narrator being the child of a Hamas member, the deputy Agriculture Minister. In June 2025, he wrote in one of his columns, "I declare proudly I'm a Zionist."

== Personal life ==
Cohen married economist and author Noreena Hertz in 2012 at the Bevis Marks Synagogue in the City of London, officiated by Lord Sacks, the Chief Rabbi. The couple live in Primrose Hill, London.

Media offices
| Preceded by Julian Bellamy | Controller of BBC Three; 2007–2010 | Succeeded by Zai Bennett |
| Preceded by Jay Hunt | Controller of BBC One; 2010–2013 | Succeeded by Charlotte Moore |
