= Access Industries =

British-American conglomerate holding company

Access Industries, Inc.
- Logo used since 2023
- Type: Private
- Industry: Conglomerate
- Founded: 1986; 40 years ago
- Founder: Len Blavatnik
- Headquarters: New York City, United States; London, England
- Key people: Len Blavatnik
- Products: Natural resources; Chemicals; Media; Telecommunications; Venture capital; Real estate; Film production; Television production; Music
- Owner: Len Blavatnik
- Subsidiaries: Warner Music Group (72%); Access Entertainment; DAZN Group
- Website: www.accessindustries.com

Access Industries, Inc. is a United States–based privately held multinational investment company which was founded in 1986 by businessman Leonard "Len" Blavatnik. Access Industries' focus is in seven sectors: biotechnology, entertainment, external funds, global media, strategic equity, technology ventures, and real estate. The group invests in the United States, Europe, Israel, and Latin America. It is headquartered in New York, with offices in London and Mill Valley, California.

Access Industries has stakes in companies including Warner Music Group, LyondellBasell, DAZN, Calpine Corporation, A24, Deezer, and Spotter.

== History ==
The first logo used from 1986 to 2023

Len Blavatnik founded Access Industries in 1986 as an investment company. He attended Harvard Business School while running the company on the side, graduating with an MBA in 1989.

Among its early investments, Access Industries helped form the large aluminum producer SUAL in 1996, which later became part of UC RUSAL. In 1997, Access acquired a 40% stake in the Russian oil company TNK. Half of TNK was sold to BP to form TNK-BP in 2003, in what was the largest-ever foreign investment in a Russian company. In 2013, Rosneft acquired TNK-BP for $55 billion, with Access Industries selling its stake and Blavatnik collecting US$7 billion for his share of the oil venture.

Access Industries purchased a large stake in the fashion label Tory Burch in 2004.

In 2005, Access acquired Basell Polyolefins which, after Basell's acquisition of Lyondell in 2007, became LyondellBasell Industries. The transaction was described by Forbes as "the greatest private equity deal of all time." LyondellBasell Industries was the third largest chemical manufacturer in the US as of 2023.

In 2006, Access Industries took an estimated 70% stake in Top Up TV, a pay TV service in the United Kingdom which sold its subscriber business to Sky in 2013. In 2007, Access Industries purchased a majority stake in the sports media company Perform Group. Also that year, Access became an owner in Acision, a software company focused on messaging systems. Acision was acquired by Comverse in 2015. As of 2010, Access retained ownership in companies such as Icon Film Distribution UK, Perform Group, Top Up TV, Amedia, RGE Group, and Warner Music Group (WMG). On July 20, 2011, Access acquired Warner Music Group for US$3.3 billion. WMG listed on the Nasdaq in 2020.

In May 2016, Access Industries launched Access Entertainment, a division headed up by former BBC Television boss Danny Cohen which specialises in investing in the entertainment media sector. After investing in Facebook before its IPO, Access exited its Facebook holdings in late 2015.

Since 2016, Access has been the majority owner of online sport-streaming service DAZN, and Deezer, the French music streaming service. In 2018, Access, alongside a consortium of investors, acquired Calpine Corporation for $5.6 billion. In 2018, Access bought the Theatre Royal Haymarket, the third oldest theatre in Britain.

In the second half of 2022, Access sold its stake in UC Rusal, thereby divesting of its last major asset in Russia.

== Holdings ==
=== Natural resources and chemicals ===
Among Access Industries' current holdings are businesses in oil, petrochemicals, power generation, aluminum and biotechnology. Access helped form the large aluminum producer SUAL 1996 with a combination of mergers and acquisitions. In 2007, SUAL merged with RUSAL and the alumina business of Glencore International AG to form UC RUSAL. RUSAL raised $2.24 billion in a 2010 IPO on the Hong Kong Stock Exchange, and in 2017 it was the world's largest aluminum producer. Access Industries is no longer a shareholder in UC Rusal, having fully divested of its shares in the company in the second half of 2022. This represented the last of its major assets in Russia.

In 2005 Access acquired Basell Polyolefins, a Dutch company specializing in polyolefins. On December 20, 2007, Basell acquired the commodity chemicals company Lyondell for approximately $20 billion. The resulting company, LyondellBasell Industries, was impacted by the 2008 financial crisis, and in 2009, the US operations of LyondellBasell Industries filed for bankruptcy. With financing in part from Access Industries, in 2010, LyondellBasell emerged from Chapter 11 bankruptcy protection in a significantly improved financial position. With a value of $15 billion, it was subsequently ranked as the world's third-largest chemical company based on net sales. Access Industries repurchased a large stake in the company in 2013. As of 2017, Access owned approximately 18% of LyondellBasell.

Since 2013, Access Industries has owned Clal Industries Ltd. (CII), an Israeli industrial investment group. Among CII's main investments are Nesher Israel Cement Enterprises, Hadera Paper, Golf & Co., Clal Biotechnology, and the logistics group Taavura. Also since 2013, Access has owned a significant interest in EP Energy, a North American oil and natural gas producer with a portfolio of fields in the United States and Brazil. On August 18, 2017, Access Industries and a consortium of investors agreed to acquire the energy company Calpine Corporation for $5.6 billion.

=== Media and telecommunications ===
Access Industries previously held stakes in a number of companies in the media and telecommunications industries including Ice (Norway), RGE Group (Israel), Channel 10 (Israel), Noga Communications and the Sports Channel (Israel). Access previously owned a majority stake in Amedia, a large Russian film and TV studio known for shows such as Poor Nastya. Amedia gained exclusive rights to premiere HBO content in Russia in July 2017. More recently, the company has invested in major media companies including Warner Music Group and DAZN. In 2021, Reshet 13, an Israeli free-to-air television channel operated by Reshet Media, received investment from a group of investors that included Access Industries.

Access invested in Warner Music Group (WMG) in 2004 with various co-investors. After a partial sale of WMG was completed through an IPO on the NYSE in May 2005, Access continued as a significant shareholder with a 2 percent stake prior to 2011. Access acquired WMG for US$3.3 billion, including $320 million in cash and the assumption of $2 billion of WMG debt.

Access Industries owns AI Film in London, a film finance and executive production company established in 2013. Since November 2014, Access Industries has owned a majority stake in DAZN Group Limited, a sports media company which Access formed in 2007 by merging Inform and Premium TV. Perform Group owns the sports website Sporting News and launched the sports streaming video service DAZN in 2016. As of 2019, Access held over 85% of the group.

In May 2015, Access Entertainment was established with the hiring of its president, Danny Cohen, BBC's former director of television. They took a 25% stake in the Bad Wolf international TV firm, and have a financing venture for drama programming with BBC Worldwide/Lookout Point and a development slate deal with House Productions. In April 2017, Access Entertainment purchased James Packer's ownership share of RatPac Entertainment, which includes the joint venture, RatPac-Dune Entertainment. In December 2021, Access Entertainment sold their stake in Bad Wolf to Sony Pictures Television.

Access Entertainment has financed several A24 productions, including the 2023 film The Zone of Interest, which was executive produced by Len Blavatnik and Danny Cohen. The film won the awards for Best International Feature and Best Sound at the 96th Academy Awards.

=== Technology ===
In 2015, Access Industries launched Access Technology Ventures, a venture and growth technology investment arm focused on pre-IPO "unicorns". As of 2017, it had investments in companies including Snapchat, Square, Yelp, Alibaba, Rocket Internet, Deezer, Gett, Spotify, Zalando, and DigitalOcean. In August 2017, Access Technology Ventures led a $300 million round of funding for the smartphone maker Essential Products, investing $100 million in the company. Access Industries formed First Access Entertainment in October 2015, which focuses on talent development and representation in music, entertainment, and fashion. Access Industries invested $137 million into Opendoor.

=== Real estate ===
Access owns a portfolio of hotels and other commercial and residential properties in the United States, Europe, South America, and the Caribbean, including:

- Faena Group (Buenos Aires, Argentina and Miami Beach, Florida)
- Grand-Hôtel du Cap-Ferrat (French Riviera, France)
- Grand Peaks (Denver, Colorado)
- Ocean Club, A Four Seasons Resort (Paradise Island, The Bahamas)
- Sunset Tower Hotel (Los Angeles, California)
- One High Line (Manhattan, New York City)
- Aman Miami Beach (Miami Beach, Florida)

== Political activities ==
Access Industries has made a variety of contributions to political candidates in local, state and national elections in the United States. In 2015, the company donated $1.8 million to Super PACs supporting Republican presidential candidates Scott Walker and Lindsey Graham.
