= Deezer =

French audio streaming service

Deezer S.A.
- Company type: Public
- Available in: 180+ countries and territories
- Traded as: Euronext Paris: DEEZR; CAC All-Share
- Founded: 22 August 2007; 19 years ago Paris, France
- Headquarters: Paris, France
- Owners: Access Industries (2016–2022)
- Founders: Daniel Marhely; Jonathan Benassaya
- Key people: Alexis Lanternier (CEO); Carl de Place (CFO); Aurélien Hérault (CIO); Matthieu Gorvan (CTO)
- Industry: Music, podcast, and video
- Services: Music streaming
- Revenue: €451 million in 2022 ($484 million) €400 million (2021)
- Website: deezer.com
- IPv6 support: No
- Commercial: Yes
- Registration: Required
- Current status: Active
- Native clients on: Web, Android, iOS, Windows, Windows Mobile, BlackBerry OS, macOS, watchOS, Wear OS, Android TV, Xbox, Chromecast, CarPlay, Android Auto, iMessage

Deezer is a French music streaming service and media service provider founded in 2007 that streams music, podcasts, and internet radio. Developed by Daniel Marhely and Jonathan Benassaya, it is available in over 180 countries and holds over 120 million licensed tracks. Deezer is available on Android, iOS, Windows, macOS and others with an unofficial installer for GNU/Linux operating systems.

The company is 41% owned by the Access Industries investment fund since 2016 and 8% by Orange Group. Also, the Saudi Arabian billionaire and House of Saud royal Al Waleed bin Talal Al Saud is invested through the Kingdom Holding Company (5.3%) and the Rotana Media Group (5.2%), and the Pinault family through the Artémis Group (4.4%). Deezer's primary stakeholder, Access Industries, is owned by Len Blavatnik.

== History ==
Deezer was founded in Paris, France, in August 2007 by Daniel Marhely and Jonathan Benassaya. Initially, it started as an independent project called Blogmusik, which allowed users to stream music directly from the web. After facing legal challenges concerning music copyrights, the platform rebranded as Deezer and secured licensing agreements with major record labels, allowing it to operate as a legal streaming service.

The site was relaunched as Deezer in August 2007 after reaching an agreement with SACEM, a French organization that manages music copyrights. Under this agreement, Deezer committed to compensating copyright holders through revenue generated from advertisements on the platform. Additionally, Deezer allowed users to see their streaming history on the iTunes Store, earning a commission for each purchase.

=== 2007–2011: Launch ===
First logo of Deezer from 2007 to 2019

At its launch in 2007, Deezer had not yet secured agreements with major music labels, resulting in a limited catalog. It took over two years for the platform to finalize deals with the four largest record labels, as well as several smaller ones. In its first month of operation, Deezer's website attracted approximately 773,000 visitors, and its popularity grew rapidly over the following years. By May 2008, the service had 2.75 million monthly users, which increased to seven million by December 2009. By 2011, Deezer had obtained the rights to approximately eight million songs.

Despite the high traffic, Deezer almost immediately ran into financial problems. During the first half of 2008, the company saw revenue of just 875,000 euros, which was not enough to pay its licensing fees. In July 2008, the company began running ads itself through advertising agency Deezer Media. In October 2008, Deezer secured $8.4 million in funding from AGF Private Equity and CM-CIC Capital Prive, bringing total investment in the company to $15.8 million. The company introduced mandatory registration in February 2009 to gather more precise data on users, to run more targeted ads, and in November 2009 began running audio ads between songs.

On 5 November 2009, Deezer launched a new three-tier service model. While continuing basic free web streaming, the company also introduced two subscription services: users paying €4.99 monthly received higher audio quality music without ads, and users paying €9.99 monthly gained access to downloadable applications for computers, as well as Android, BlackBerry and iOS mobile devices.

In January 2010, the company's CEO and co-founder, Jonathan Benassaya, was replaced as CEO by Axel Dauchez, after fewer than 15,000 of Deezer's 12 million users signed up for its subscription services. In August 2010, mobile operator Orange partnered with Deezer in a deal to include free access to Deezer Premium, the highest tier of Deezer's streaming packages, with some of Orange's telecommunications contracts in France. Almost immediately after the partnership began, the rate of users signing up for Deezer's premium services went from 6,000 a month to 100,000. By January 2011, 500,000 people were subscribing to the service, and the millionth subscriber mark joined in the middle of 2011, which was half a year ahead of Deezer's expectation. The two companies expanded their partnership in September 2011 to include Orange contract customers in the UK. Also in September, Deezer added Facebook integration to its service, allowing users to send music to one another via that social media service.

=== 2012–2013: International expansion ===
Deezer was launched in France in 2007, where it was the market leader as of 2017. On 7 December 2011, Deezer, at the time available only in Belgium, France and the United Kingdom, announced plans to expand worldwide during the rest of 2011 and continuing into 2012. According to the company, it planned to make its services available to all of Europe by the end of the year, to the Americas (excluding the United States) by the end of January 2012, to Africa and Southeast Asia by the end of February, and the rest of the world (excluding Japan) by the end of June.

Service was not available across the whole of Europe until 15 March 2012, and service launched in Australia, Canada, and New Zealand on 25 April. On 8 June, Deezer announced availability in 35 Latin American countries, though not in Brazil, Cuba, or Venezuela. On 15 August, Deezer announced it would be available in Indonesia, Malaysia, Pakistan, the Philippines, Singapore, and Thailand within several weeks.

On 8 October 2012, Deezer announced that it had received $130 million in funding from Access Industries, to be used for further international expansion. Two days later, the company announced that it had expanded into 76 new markets, bringing its worldwide total to 160 countries. On 21 December, Deezer announced a new service level offering two hours of free, ad-supported music streaming a month, available to users worldwide, the company's first free music streaming service outside France. CEO Dauchez said that Deezer was also looking for a partner to introduce service in the United States, who was "able to provide us with a significant volume of subscribers" to help offset what he called the "unbelievably high" costs of entering the US market.

As of December 2012, Deezer had about two million users paying for subscriptions, out of a monthly active user base of about seven million, with 20 million songs in its library. By 2016, according to CEO Dauchez, the company aimed to have five percent of the global music market.

In January 2013, Deezer announced its expansion into 22 new countries across Africa, Asia, Brazil, the Middle East, and the United States, bringing its total to 182. However, the US launch has been restricted to a limited number of device promotions. In July 2016, Deezer added the U.S. to the supported country list. As of March 2022, Deezer listed on its website 185 regions where the service was available.

=== 2013–present: After expansion ===
Countries where Deezer is available (as of March 2022)

Following this expansion, in 2013 Deezer announced partnerships with LG Electronics, Samsung Electronics and Toshiba, which meant Deezer apps were available on smart TV platforms, along with a new brand identity developed in association with the illustrator mcbess.

Since then, Deezer has made a number of announcements, including its Developer Reward Scheme, mobile App Studio and API upgrades, a new, exclusive beta version of its mobile app for Android users, and the new Deezer app for Windows 8.

April 2013 also saw Deezer update its iOS app with a new smart caching feature, allowing the app to identify and remember a user's most played tracks, even in areas of poor network coverage.

In June 2014, Deezer announced a new partnership with Samsung giving Samsung Galaxy S5 users in Europe a free, six months Deezer Premium+ subscription. Samsung and Deezer extended their partnership by offering a six-month, free of charge subscription to Deezer Premium+ for Samsung's Multiroom Wireless Audio Products, including its M5 and M7 line of Multiroom wireless audio speakers. Samsung UK and Deezer offered this promotion again from 2016 to 2018.

In June 2014, Deezer and Google announced that the Google Chromecast would be supporting Deezer's Android and iPhone apps to allow users to stream music from their phone to their televisions through the Chromecast. Chromecast support became available to Deezer Premium+ users from 25 June 2014 onwards in Australia, Belgium, Brazil, Canada, Finland, France, Germany, the Netherlands, Norway, Portugal, South Korea, Spain, Sweden, Switzerland, and the United Kingdom.

In September 2014, Deezer announced Deezer Elite, a new exclusive service made for and in partnership with Sonos. Deezer Elite provides CD-quality audio to U.S. users of Sonos Hi-Fi Systems. The service is available worldwide to Sonos users of Deezer only. Deezer Elite "High-Resolution Audio" is lossless CD quality (16bit/44.1 kHz) and not "Hi-Res" or high-resolution audio. Sonos does not support Hi-Res (24/96, 24/192 or similar) streaming.

In the US, Deezer HiFi offers 36 million tracks of 16-Bit/44.1 kHz of FLAC quality music for a $19.95 monthly subscription. It is "Only available on selected soundsystems and the Desktop App," and offers downloads to phones at 320 kbit/s.

In October 2014, Deezer announced that Bose SoundTouch and SoundLink products would now be supported for Deezer Premium+ service. This partnership will first be rolled out in the United States and then will be available to worldwide users.

In October 2014, Deezer announced that Stitcher Radio would be merging into Deezer. By 2015, Deezer users would be able to use Stitcher Radio features within Deezer.

In December 2014, Deezer and Pepsi announced a partnership to set up the Midem Artist Accelerator to support managers and labels as they grow the profiles of their artists. In June 2016, it sold Stitcher to E.W. Scripps Company for $4.5 million

Second logo from 2019 to 2023

On 7 November 2019, Deezer released Spleeter, an open-source stem separation utility written in Python that uses the TensorFlow machine learning library and pretrained models for audio stem extraction.

In September 2020, Deezer joined a number of tech companies in the Coalition for App Fairness led by Epic Games to demand better conditions for the inclusion of their apps in the app stores of Apple and Google.

In the first quarter of 2021, Deezer held a 2% market share of the music streaming service market. In July 2021, Deezer announced that free account users could use Google Assistant speakers to stream music.

On 5 July 2022, Deezer became a publicly traded company.

In June 2023, Deezer announced the launch of an AI-based tool designed to identify and label songs utilizing artificially generated vocal duplicates. This initiative is geared towards protecting the earnings of legitimate artists.

In September 2023, it was announced that Deezer and Universal Music Group had struck a deal to change the way royalty payments were split between artists. As part of the new model, streams of songs from professional artists — defined as those who generate at least 1,000 listens a month — will be given double the weight of streams from non-professionals when calculating royalty payments.

In November 2023, Deezer announced a new brand identity, changing the app's logo to a stylized purple heart, and rebranding as an "experience services platform".

== Subscription tiers ==
Subscription	Ads	Skipping and scrubbing	Offline mode	TV, HiFi, and car Support	Google Chromecast support	Accounts	Highest quality
Deezer Free	Ad-supported	Unlimited skips and scrubbing (desktop) Six skips per hour, no scrubbing (mobile)	Unavailable	Available (restricted)	Available (restricted)	1	MP3 quality (128 kbit/s)
Deezer Student	None	Unlimited skips and scrubbing	Available	Available	Available	1	CD Quality (16-Bit/44.1 kHz FLAC)
Deezer Premium	None	Unlimited skips and scrubbing	Available	Available	Available	1	CD Quality (16-Bit/44.1 kHz FLAC)
Deezer Family	None	Unlimited skips and scrubbing	Available	Available	Available	6	CD Quality (16-Bit/44.1 kHz FLAC)

== AI strategy ==
In response to the increasing proliferation of AI-generated music on streaming platforms, Deezer has implemented a multi-faceted strategy to preserve the integrity of its service and protect artists’ rights. Deezer's AI strategy centers on enhancing transparency, combating fraudulent AI-generated content, protecting artist royalties, and ensuring responsible use of AI in music streaming.

In October 2024, Deezer became the first major streaming platform to sign the "Statement on AI Training," opposing the unlicensed use of copyrighted works to train generative AI systems.

By April 2025, Deezer reported that approximately 18% of daily uploads—over 20,000 tracks per day—were fully AI-generated. In January 2025, the company deployed a sophisticated AI detection tool, which identified around 10,000 AI-generated tracks daily, and allowed Deezer to exclude such content from algorithmic and editorial recommendations. In June 2026, Deezer updated their estimates for prevalance of AI-generated music being released; they said that they receive nearly 75,000 AI-generated tracks per day, making up more than 44% of its new music delivery.

In June 2025, Deezer introduced a tagging system to label albums containing fully AI-generated tracks. The move was part of a broader fight against streaming fraud; a report indicated that up to 70% of streams of AI-generated music were fraudulent—commonly orchestrated by bots to inflate royalty payouts—and Deezer responded by blocking royalty payments for these tracks and removing them from its recommendation algorithms.

In June 2026, Deezer made its AI music detection system available to the wider music industry, claiming to help against fraudulent streaming and promoting transparency. Alongside this, Deezer also launched a freely usable tool for end users to check their own playlists, across many other streaming platforms, for presence of AI-generated music.

== See also ==
- List of streaming media systems
- Comparison of music streaming services
