= Houston Refining =

Oil refinery in Texas, United States

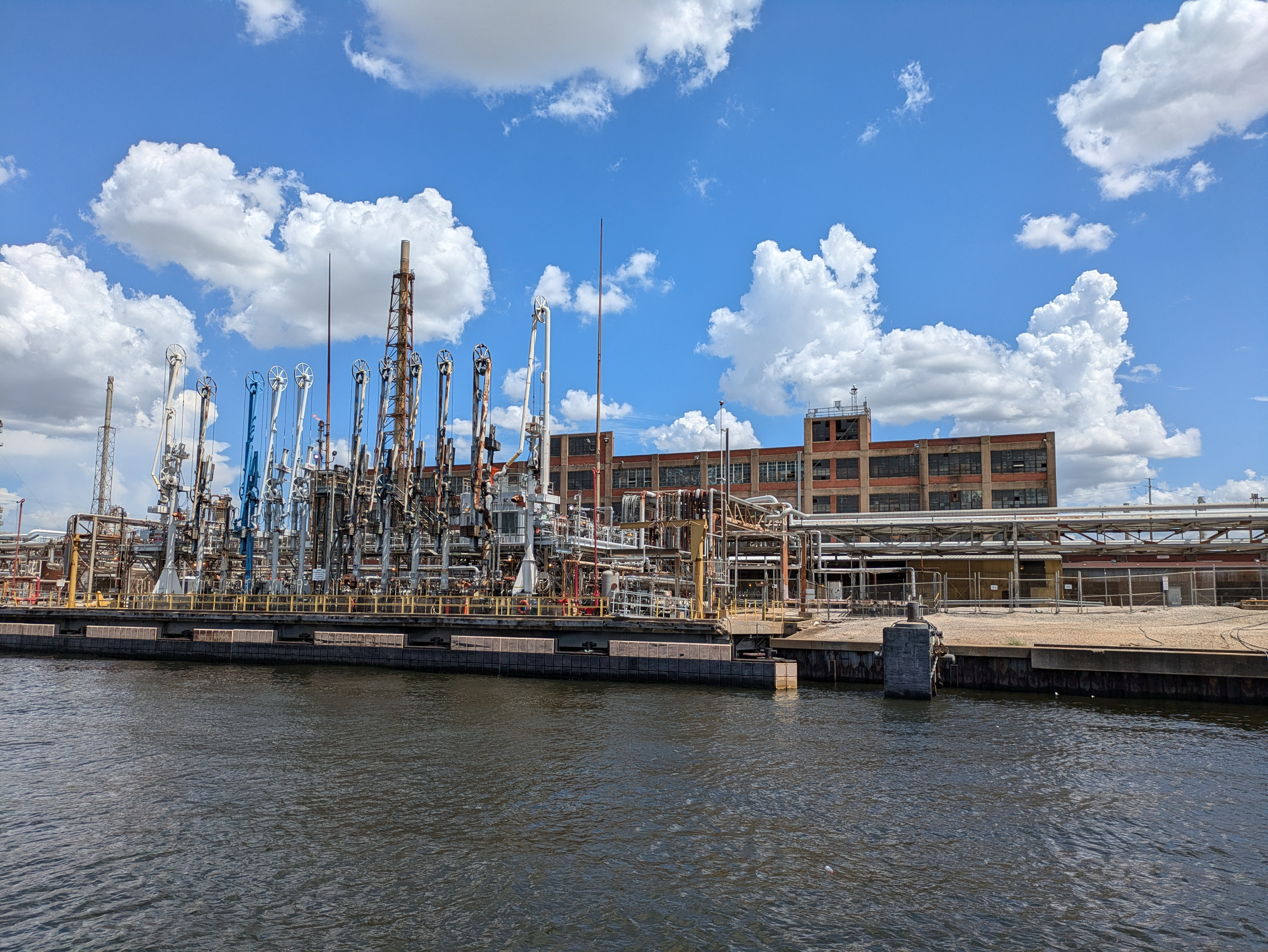
A view of LyondellBasell's Houston refinery from the Houston Ship Channel in 2024

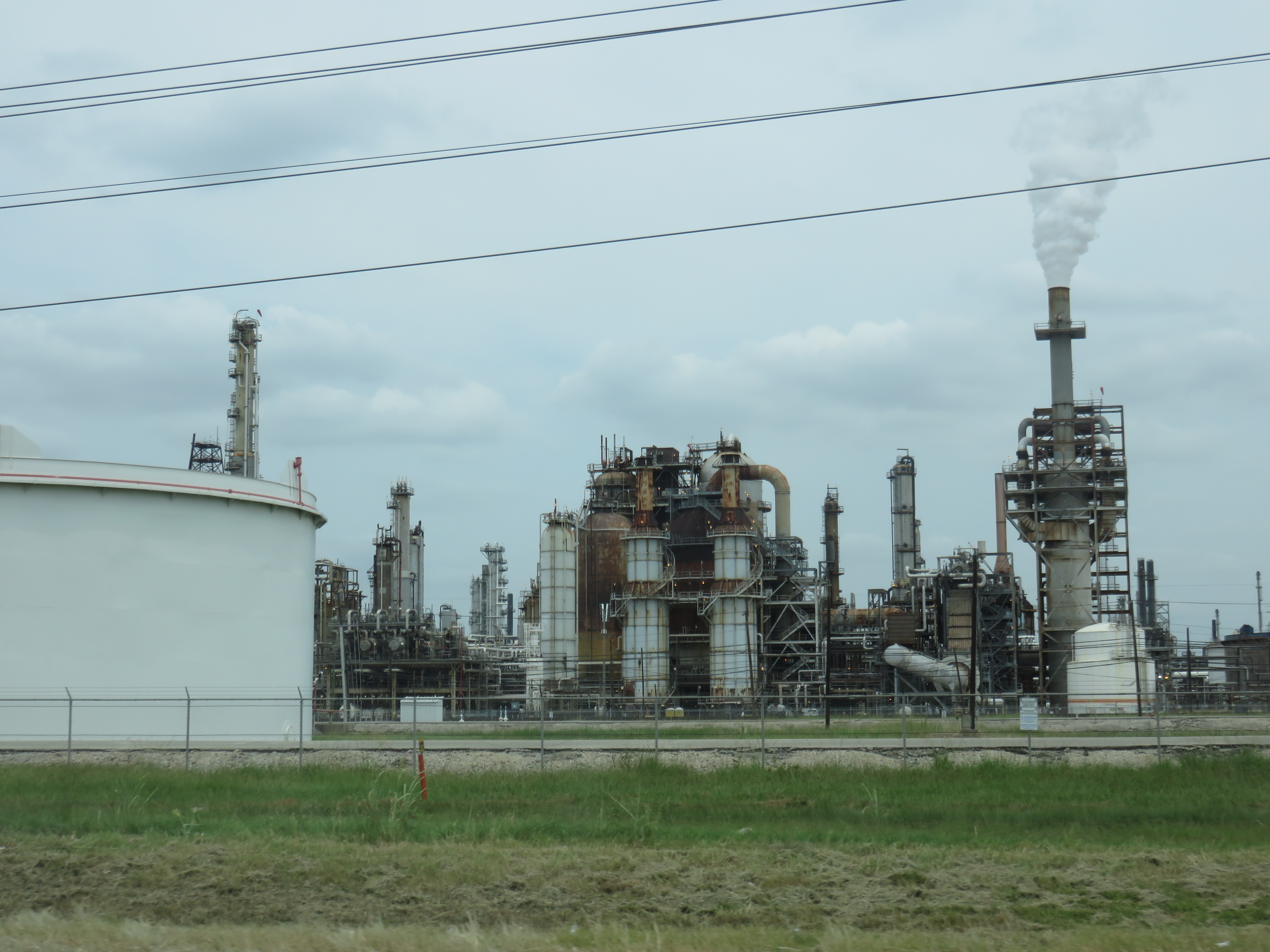
A view of the refinery from Pasadena Freeway in 2018

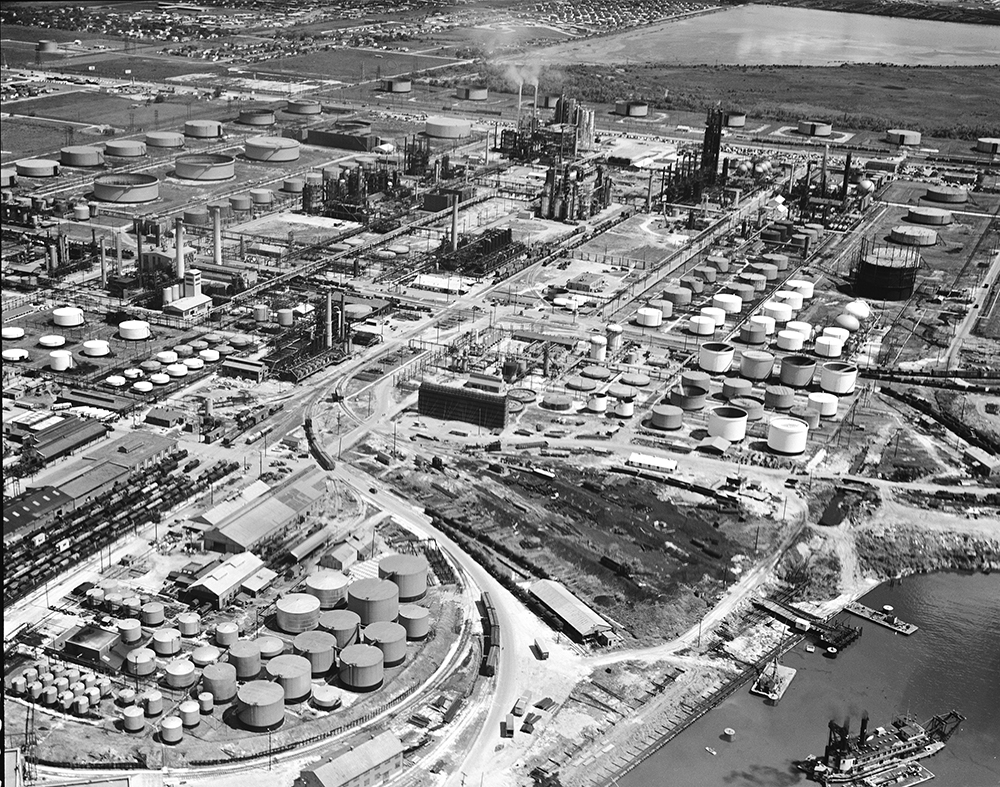
As the Sinclair Refinery in 1955, with Lawndale St in the background and the Ship Channel in the foreground

Operating as Houston Refining, LP, LyondellBasell's Houston refinery is a 268,000-barrel-per-day (42,600 m^{3}/d) refinery located on the Texas Gulf Coast in Houston that occupies 700 acres (2.8 km^{2}) along the Houston Ship Channel. This refinery has been in operation since 1918, and it currently produces gasoline, lubricant base stock, propylene, and other associated materials. LyondellBasell has announced its intention to close this refinery by 2023, to help it reach its climate-change goals.

== Products ==
The refinery has the ability to transform heavy, high-sulfur crude oil into fuels such as reformulated gasoline and low-sulfur diesel, as well as other products such as jet fuel, heating oil, lubricants, petroleum coke and aromatics. It also has the ability to transform Light Sweet Crude into Naphthenic Lube Oils, as well as treat White Oils in its Lube Oil Complex.

=== Capacity ===
- Crude run capacity: 268,000 barrels per day (42,600 m^{3}/d)
- Gasoline: 120,000 bbl/d (19,000 m^{3}/d)
- Diesel: 95,000 bbl/d (15,100 m^{3}/d)
- Sweet Crude run Capacity: 7,000 bbl/d (1,100 m^{3}/d)
- Naphthenic Lube oils: 3,600 bbl/d (570 m^{3}/d)
- White Oil: 850 bbl/d (135 m^{3}/d)

== History ==
The origins of Houston Refining date to 1918, when Harry Sinclair (Sinclair Oil) began building a battery still on the site. As the refinery grew, additional processing units were built to produce lubricants and aromatic chemicals, and with the addition of the fluid catalytic cracker in 1952, and the 736 coker in 1968, the refinery emerged as one of the earliest full-conversion refineries on the Texas Gulf Coast.

In 1969, Sinclair Oil was acquired by Atlantic Richfield (Arco). Although Arco was primarily an oil company, the company realized the potential synergies between the Houston refinery and a chemicals complex it owned in nearby Channelview, Texas. To take advantage of this, Arco invested in a major expansion of the refinery that was completed in 1976, and that enabled it to process heavy sour crude to produce refined products and chemical plant feeds. At the same time, two world-scale ethylene crackers were built at the Channelview complex that were capable of processing naphtha and heavier liquids from the refinery.

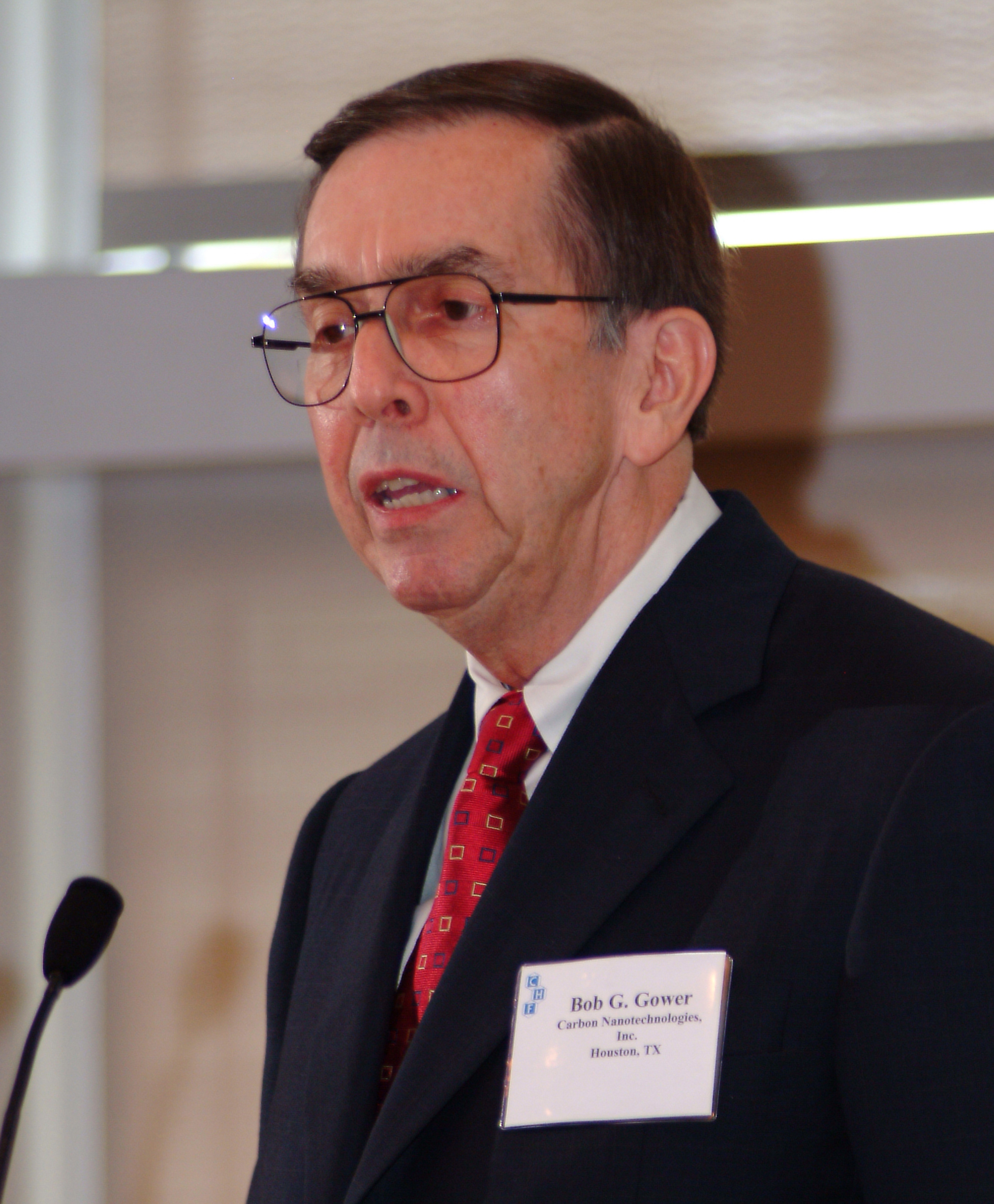
Bob Gower in 2004

By the early 1980s, however, the commodity chemicals business entered a prolonged period of oversupply, and the performance of Arco's Houston area assets began to decline. In addition, Arco's strategic planning group in Los Angeles, headed by Dr. Bob Gower, developed a long-range forecast calling for a decline in the price of crude oil. At the time Arco was in a bidding war with Chevron for Gulf Oil, but the crude oil price forecast made that acquisition look increasingly less favorable. Adding to the uncertainty was the value of Gulf's chemical assets.

Bob Gower's planning group was then tasked with the job of finding a way to either sell, spin off or shut down the Houston assets, which were losing on the order of $100 million per year by 1984. Instead Gower proposed a radical plan to combine the chemical plant and refinery into a single business unit that would take advantage of operational synergies and other opportunities to return to break-even performance. With nothing to lose, Arco approved Gower's plan and Lyondell Chemical became a wholly owned subsidiary of Arco on April 15, 1985, with Bob Gower as its president.

Arco itself also undertook a major restructuring in 1985, which included taking a $900 million write-off of the Houston area assets of what was now Lyondell Chemical. Even with the write-off Lyondell continued to lose money in 1985, albeit at a greatly reduced rate, and by early 1986, the company began to return to profitability. Aided in part by the writedown, profits for 1986, and 1987, averaged in the range of $120 million, and as the chemical cycle began an upswing in 1988 the company began seeing profits of $10–20 million per month.

Seizing an opportunity to cash out at the top of the cycle, in mid-1988, Arco decided to offer 50.1% of Lyondell Chemical to the public via an initial public offering (IPO). To ensure that the offering was fully subscribed, Arco also promised that Lyondell would pay out all cash flow in excess of capital needs in the form of special dividends to the shareholders. Arco was initially able to sell approximately 53% of its stake when the IPO occurred in January 1989; however the price quickly fell below the IPO price and Arco was forced to repurchase some of the shares which resulted in giving Arco a 49.9% interest in the Houston refinery and the other Houston area assets.

Part of Lyondell's strategy from the start was to operate as a merchant refiner. This meant that even as a wholly owned subsidiary the company was not obligated to purchase crude oil from the Arco parent, nor was it required to sell product to Arco's refined products marketing organization. However, the lack of long-term crude supply contracts meant that the company was subject to dramatic swings in the cost of raw materials and refined products. Initially the company tried to manage this risk through a hedging strategy based on crude and refined product derivatives contracts, but when this proved to be unsuccessful company planners began to investigate the sale of the Houston refinery.

In early 1990, Lyondell began talks with several interested parties regarding the sale of the Houston refinery. These talks progressed throughout the spring and summer of 1990 with several potential buyers including representatives of several mid-east oil companies. However the Iraqi invasion of Kuwait in August 1990, and the subsequent uncertainty in the global petroleum markets damped interest in the refinery and Lyondell was forced to end discussions regarding its sale.

Prior to the IPO, Lyondell's refinery evaluations team had been engaged in a project to negotiate a long-term crude supply agreement (CSA) with a major oil producer. This project was shut down when Arco decided to take Lyondell public, but when the refinery sale project ended interest in a long-term CSA was revived. Earlier discussions had indicated that in addition to locking in a guaranteed source of crude there was an opportunity to expand the refinery's heavy crude processing capability.

Petroleos de Venezuela, S.A. (PDVSA) was one of the two producers who participated in the earlier study. In a two-part transaction, Lyondell negotiated a 25-year CSA with PDVSA to supply 240 MBD of heavy Venezuelan crude to the refinery, and PDVSA's wholly owned U.S. subsidiary Citgo agreed to invest in the refinery expansion project in exchange for partial ownership of the refinery. Initially estimated to cost $500 million, the refinery expansion project would eventually top $1.2 billion and lead to some acrimonious relationships between Lyondell and Citgo.

In 1993, CITGO entered into a joint venture agreement with Lyondell Chemical to form the Lyondell-CITGO Refinery Company in Houston; of which Lyondell owned 58.75 percent and CITGO owned the remaining 41.25 percent.

On August 16, 2006, Lyondell Chemical Company bought CITGO's share, and as a result, Houston Refining became a wholly owned subsidiary of Lyondell.

In April of 2022, LyondellBasell announced plans to close the refinery by the end of 2023. The target closure date was pushed back to Q1 2025 due to a period of strong refining margins.
