= Basell Polyolefins =

International company

- Company type: Joint venture
- Industry: Polypropylene
- Fate: Acquired by Lyondell Chemical Company in 2007, subsequently merged with LyondellBasell
- Owner: BASF; Royal Dutch Shell

Basell Polyolefins was a joint venture between BASF and Royal Dutch Shell. Leonard Blavatnik's Access Industries acquired it from the venturers for $5.7 billion in August 2005. In 2007, Basell merged with the privately owned US company Lyondell Chemical Company to form LyondellBasell, which went bankrupt in the US in January 2009, and emerged from bankruptcy in April 2010.

== Company history ==
Basell's heritage comes from many companies, including BASF, Hercules, Himont, Hoechst, ICI, Montecatini, Montedison and Royal Dutch Shell. However Basell, and then later LyondellBasell, had its origin in a joint venture between BASF and Royal Dutch Shell. Spurred on by the work of Nobel Prize-winning scientists Karl Ziegler and Giulio Natta, these Basell predecessor companies were among the leaders of the polyolefin revolution that began in the late 1930s and 1950s. This transformation is still driving the petrochemicals industry today. In 2007, driven on by its then owners Access Industries and against the advice of Basell senior management, Basell acquired the privately owned US company Lyondell Chemical Company to form LyondellBasell, paying far above the market rate for the shares. The main winner was Access, who also held significant shares in Lyondell and was able to realise a massive profit by forcing Basell to overpay. This drove the new company rapidly to file for chapter 11 in the US in January 2009, from which it emerged in May 2010.

1953
LyondellBasell predecessor company scientist Professor Karl Ziegler discovers the first linear polyethylene (PE) chain.
1954
LyondellBasell predecessor company scientist Giulio Natta polymerizes the first crystalline polypropylene.
1963
Natta and Ziegler jointly awarded the Nobel Prize in Chemistry for their discoveries in polyolefins technology and catalysts.
1969
The PO/TBA process, invented by Atlantic Richfield Company. (ARCO), produces propylene oxide with tertiary butyl alcohol (TBA) as the co-product.
1975
Start-up of the first Hostalen high-density polyethylene (HDPE) process plant.
1982
Spheripol process, currently the most widely used polyolefins process technology, first introduced by predecessor company Montedison
1985
Lyondell Chemical Company is formed from selected chemical and refining assets of Atlantic Richfield Company (ARCO).
1989
Lyondell is spun off from ARCO, becoming a public company listed on the New York Stock Exchange (Ticker symbol: LYO).
1990
Lyondell acquires low-density polyethylene (LDPE) and polypropylene (PP) businesses from Rexene.
1993
LYONDELL-CITGO Refining (LCR) is formed as the Houston Refinery becomes a joint venture with CITGO Petroleum Corporation.
1997
Equistar Chemicals, LP is formed as a joint venture between Lyondell, Oxy Chemicals and Millennium Chemicals Inc.
1998
Lyondell acquires ARCO Chemical Company.
2000
Basell is formed through the merger of Montell, Targor and Elenac; a 50/50 joint venture between BASF and Shell.
2001
Basell completes start-up of the world's largest low-density polyethylene plant (LDPE) in Aubette, France, with a single line capacity of 320,000 tons per year.
2002
Lyondell increases interest in Equistar to 70.5 percent with acquisition of Occidental's share.
2004
Lyondell acquires Millennium Chemicals Inc. As a result, Equistar becomes a wholly owned subsidiary of Lyondell.
2005
Access Industries, a privately held industrial group with long-term holdings around the world, purchases Basell.
2006
Lyondell acquires CITGO’s 41.25 percent ownership interest in LCR. As a result of this transaction, Houston Refining LP(formerly LCR) becomes a wholly owned subsidiary of Lyondell.
2007
Basell and Lyondell merge to become LyondellBasell Industries - one of the world's largest polymers, chemicals and fuels companies.
2008
LyondellBasell completes acquisition of Solvay Engineered Polymers, Inc.

LyondellBasell purchases the Berre refinery, located in Berre l’Etang, France from Shell.

2009
LyondellBasell voluntarily files for protection under Chapter 11 of the U.S. Bankruptcy Code.
2010
LyondellBasell emerges from Chapter 11 protection a stronger organization, with a significantly de-levered balance sheet, a radically improved cost structure, a new leadership team and a clear focus on Everyday Excellence and Goal Zero. Listed on the NYSE as a publicly traded company (Ticker symbols: LYB and LYB.B).
