= Peter Vanacker =

Belgian-German business executive

Peter Vanacker (born 1966) is a Belgian-German business executive who has been chief executive officer of LyondellBasell since May 2022. He previously led Neste, CABB Group and Treofan Group.

Vanacker has Belgian and German citizenship.

== Education ==
Vanacker earned a master's degree in chemical engineering and polymer engineering from Ghent University.

== Career ==
Vanacker held a succession of roles at Bayer AG, including executive vice president and head of its global polyurethanes business and membership of the executive committee of Bayer MaterialScience. He later was chief executive officer and managing director of Treofan Group.

From 2015 to 2018, Vanacker was chief executive officer and managing director of CABB Group.

In February 2018, Neste appointed Vanacker to succeed the retiring Matti Lievonen as president and chief executive officer. He assumed the role on 1 November 2018.

LyondellBasell's board appointed Vanacker as the company's next chief executive officer in December 2021. He assumed the position on 23 May 2022.
