= Len Blavatnik =

Businessman and philanthropist (born 1957)

Sir Leonard Blavatnik
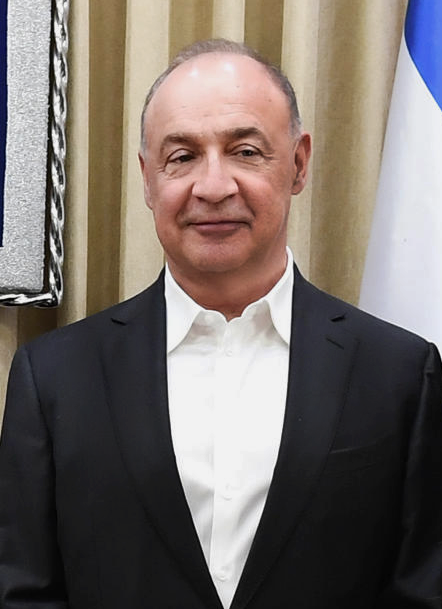
- Blavatnik in 2018
- Born: Leonid Valentinovich Blavatnik; June 14, 1957 (age 69); Odessa, Ukrainian SSR, Soviet Union (now Odesa, Ukraine)
- Citizenship: United Kingdom; United States; Greece
- Education: Moscow State University of Railway Engineering; Columbia University (MS); Harvard University (MBA)
- Occupations: Businessman; philanthropist
- Spouse: Emily Appelson
- Children: 5

Sir Leonard Blavatnik (Russian: Леонид Валентинович Блаватник, romanized: Leonid Valentinovich Blavatnik; born June 14, 1957) is a Soviet Union-born oligarch. He now also holds British, American and Greek citizenships.

Blavatnik made his initial fortune, alongside other Russian oligarchs, in the privatization of state-owned aluminum and oil assets after the collapse of the Soviet Union. As of April 2025, Forbes estimated his net worth at $26.5 billion, ranking him the 75th-richest person in the world.

Blavatnik owns most of Warner Music Group via his privately held Access Industries, and is a major donor of Harvard University. He received a knighthood for his public donations in 2017.

== Early life and education ==
Blavatnik was born in Odessa in 1957, then in the Ukrainian SSR and part of the Soviet Union, to a Jewish family. His parents moved to Yaroslavl, a Russian city north of Moscow, when he was a child. He attended Moscow State University of Railway Engineering but did not complete his coursework due to the family's request for emigration visas. At the University of Railway Engineering, he became close friends with Viktor Vekselberg, another Ukrainian Jew, who would go on to found Renova Group.

Blavatnik's family emigrated from the Soviet Union to the United States of America in 1978 and, in 1981, he received a master's degree in computer science from the School of Engineering and Applied Science at Columbia University, and an MBA from Harvard Business School in 1989.

== Career ==
In 1986, Blavatnik founded the holding company, Access Industries. The New York-based business controls 21% of LyondellBasell, the world's largest producer of polypropylene. Through Access Industries, Blavatnik owns most of Warner Music Group, and conducts most of his business operations.

=== Natural resources sector ===
After the collapse of the Soviet Union, Blavatnik used Access Industries to buy up former state assets in Russia that were privatized by the government, particularly accumulating shares in aluminum smelters to make his wealth.

One of his investments, Sual, invested in regional electricity generating stations, which it used to supply power to its energy-intensive aluminum businesses. Sual later became part of United Company Rusal, the world's largest aluminum producer. Blavatnik was a board member of Rusal from 2007 to 2016.

In 1997, Blavatnik Access Industries united with Viktor Vekselberg's Renova Group and Mikhail Fridman's Alfa Group, to form the company AAR (Alfa, Access, Renova). Blavatnik's key role within AAR was to act as a connection to western businesses such as BP.

AAR bought 40% of struggling oil producer Tyumen Oil (TNK), one of few remaining state-owned oil companies, for $800 million. AAR outbid its competitors but reportedly paid just a quarter of the agreed sum. TNK began a series of acquisitions, focusing on the oil company Sidanko, which was part-owned by BP. In 1999, TNK acquired Sidanko's best assets via bankruptcy proceedings.

BP later sued TNK in New York courts, claiming that the Sidanko assets were acquired illegally. The 1999 lawsuit was resolved in 2003 when BP acquired TNK for $8 billion, forming TNK-BP, one of the largest oil companies in Russia. The deal gave BP unprecedented access to vital Russian oil and gas. The deal also made Blavatnik, Mikhail Fridman, German Khan and Viktor Vekselberg, who controlled half of TNK-BP, billions of dollars. At the time of the purchase, Blavatnik, a U.S. citizen, was living in New York.

In 2013, the Russian oil company Rosneft paid AAR $28 billion in cash for its 50% stake in TNK-BP. AAR's original investment had been $8 billion of assets, and up to that point, AAR had taken $19 billion in dividends from the joint venture.

In 1999, Blavatnik's TNK company obtained Chernogorneft at auction for at $180 million, though the company had produced $1.2 billion worth of oil the year before. In 2022, Blavatnik sold his stake in Russian aluminum producer United Co. Rusal International PJSC, divesting his last major asset in the country according to Bloomberg News.

=== Petrochemicals and oil ===
In August 2005, Access Industries bought petrochemicals and plastics manufacturer Basell Polyolefins from Royal Dutch Shell and BASF for $5.7 billion. On December 20, 2007, Basell completed its acquisition of the Lyondell Chemical Company for an enterprise value of approximately $19 billion. The resulting company, LyondellBasell Industries became the world's eighth largest chemical company based on net sales. On January 6, 2009, the U.S. operations of LyondellBasell Industries filed for bankruptcy.

On April 30, 2010, LyondellBasell emerged from Chapter 11 bankruptcy protection in a significantly improved financial position. As part of its exit financing, LyondellBasell raised $3.25 billion of first-priority debt, as well as $2.8 billion through the rights offering jointly underwritten by Access Industries, Apollo Management, and Ares Management.

=== Entertainment ===
In early 2010, Access Industries was reported as one of a handful of bidders for Metro-Goldwyn-Mayer. On May 6, 2011, Warner Music Group announced its sale to Access for US$3.3 billion. On July 20, 2011, an Access affiliate acquired Warner Music Group for $3.3 billion. Though WMG was the World's third largest record company and considered a "trophy asset", it was also laden with debt and struggling to find an answer to online music piracy.

In May 2020, Warner Music announced it would proceed with an initial public offering that valued the company at $13.3 billion. The company listed on the Nasdaq stock exchange in June 2020. At which point, Blavatnik sold $1.9 billion of shares.

In 2012, Access Industries made a €100 million investment in Deezer, the music streaming service.

In 2014, Access acquired Perform Group for £702 million.

In 2016, Blavatnik launched Access Entertainment, which bought James Packer's stake in RatPac Entertainment and a 24.9% stake in Bad Wolf in 2017.

In 2017, Blavatnik was named as possible purchaser of the publisher Time Inc.. He prepared the bid with Edgar "Ed" Bronfman Jr, the former chief executive of Warner Music. In March 2017, Bronfman and Blavatnik walked away from the deal, citing valuation issues.

In April 2018, it was reported that Blavatnik was a front runner in the bidding to purchase Britain's third oldest theatre, the Theatre Royal Haymarket. Sources reported that the bid was around £40 million. Blavatnik's Access Entertainment finalized its purchase of the Theatre Royal Haymarket in June 2018.

Blavatnik also owns AI Film, the independent film and production company that backed Lee Daniels' film The Butler and the summer 2015 release Mr. Holmes. He was an early investor in Rocket Internet and Beats Music, helped finance fashion designer Tory Burch, and, in 2013, paid $115 million for wireless spectrum in Norway.

Blavatnik has been the owner of DAZN Group since 2014, when Access Industries increased its stake in the company from 42.5% to 77%.

=== DAZN ===
DAZN (pronounced "da zone") is a sports streaming service available in Japan, Germany, and Canada. The company is part of Perform Group, a U.K. based sports media company owned by Len Blavatnik's Access Industries. DAZN buys rights to broadcast sports including football, boxing and Formula 1 motor racing, outside of their domestic markets.

In May 2018, DAZN signed an eight-year, $1 billion deal with Eddie Hearn's Matchroom Boxing to stream fights on a new U.S. subscription service.

In June 2018, DAZN paid €600 million for domestic screening rights for Italian Serie A football matches in a three-year deal. The deal was believed to involve 2.5 billion euros ($3 billion) of payments over its three-season lifespan.

In October 2018, DAZN signed the largest commercial deal in history with a single athlete when they paid Mexican boxer Saul "Canelo" Alvarez $365 million for the rights to screen 11 fights.

DAZN's last set of published results, for the year to 2019, showed a loss of more than $1.3 billion for continuing and discontinued operations. The company's revenue decreased sharply when the COVID-19 pandemic brought a halt to live sports. DAZN refused to pay European football leagues for games that had been put on hold.

In late 2020, DAZN unveiled a slate of original documentary programming featuring global sporting icons such as Ronaldo and British boxer Anthony Joshua.

In February 2022, Blavatnik agreed a $4.3 billion recapitalisation of DAZN. The Financial Times reported that this would enable the company to target new revenue streams in betting.

In January 2025, Blavatnik acquired Australian sports broadcaster Foxtel from News Corp and Telstra via DAZN in a AU$3.4 billion deal.

=== Telecommunications ===
Access Industries purchased the mobile phone technology company Acision from the IT Group Logica for £265 million in 2007. As of 2018, Access Industries owned 60% of Ice Group, Norway's third largest telecoms company.

=== Blavatnik Archive ===
Blavatnik founded the Blavatnik Archive in 2005 to support primary source-based scholarship and education by preserving and disseminating materials that contribute to the study of 20th century Jewish and world history.

== Controversies and disputes ==
=== Claim against JP Morgan Chase ===
In 2010, Blavatnik sued JPMorgan Chase after losing $100 million by allegedly following Morgan's advice three years earlier to buy mortgage securities with AAA credit ratings. In 2013, the New York State Supreme Court ordered JPMorgan Chase to pay Blavatnik $50 million in damages.

At the time, Blavatnik told The New York Times: "The small guy can't get anywhere with suits like this. I am a wealthy man. I will spend whatever it takes."

=== Sanctions during Russo-Ukraine War ===
In the wake of sanctions targeting Russian oligarchs during the Russo-Ukrainian War, media attention debated Blavatnik's status as a Russian oligarch, and his corresponding connection to Vladimir Putin. Some outlets have suggested Blavatnik has been involved in reputation laundering through his philanthropic projects, and that he maintains close connections to Viktor Vekselberg, an oligarch sanctioned by the US government. Blavatnik denies connections to Putin, and has attempted unsuccessfully to avoid the label of oligarch. In December 2023, Ukraine's President Volodymyr Zelenskyy imposed personal sanctions against Blavatnik.

=== Protests at Tate Modern ===
In 2024, protesters outside the Tate Modern art gallery accused Blavatnik of working to stifle criticism of Israeli Prime Minister Benjamin Netanyahu by facilitating the appointment of Yulia Shamalov-Berkovich as CEO of Channel 13's news department. Blavatnik's spokesperson rejected the suggestion of Blavatnik's involvement in the matter.

=== Group chat to change U.S. public opinion on Gaza war ===
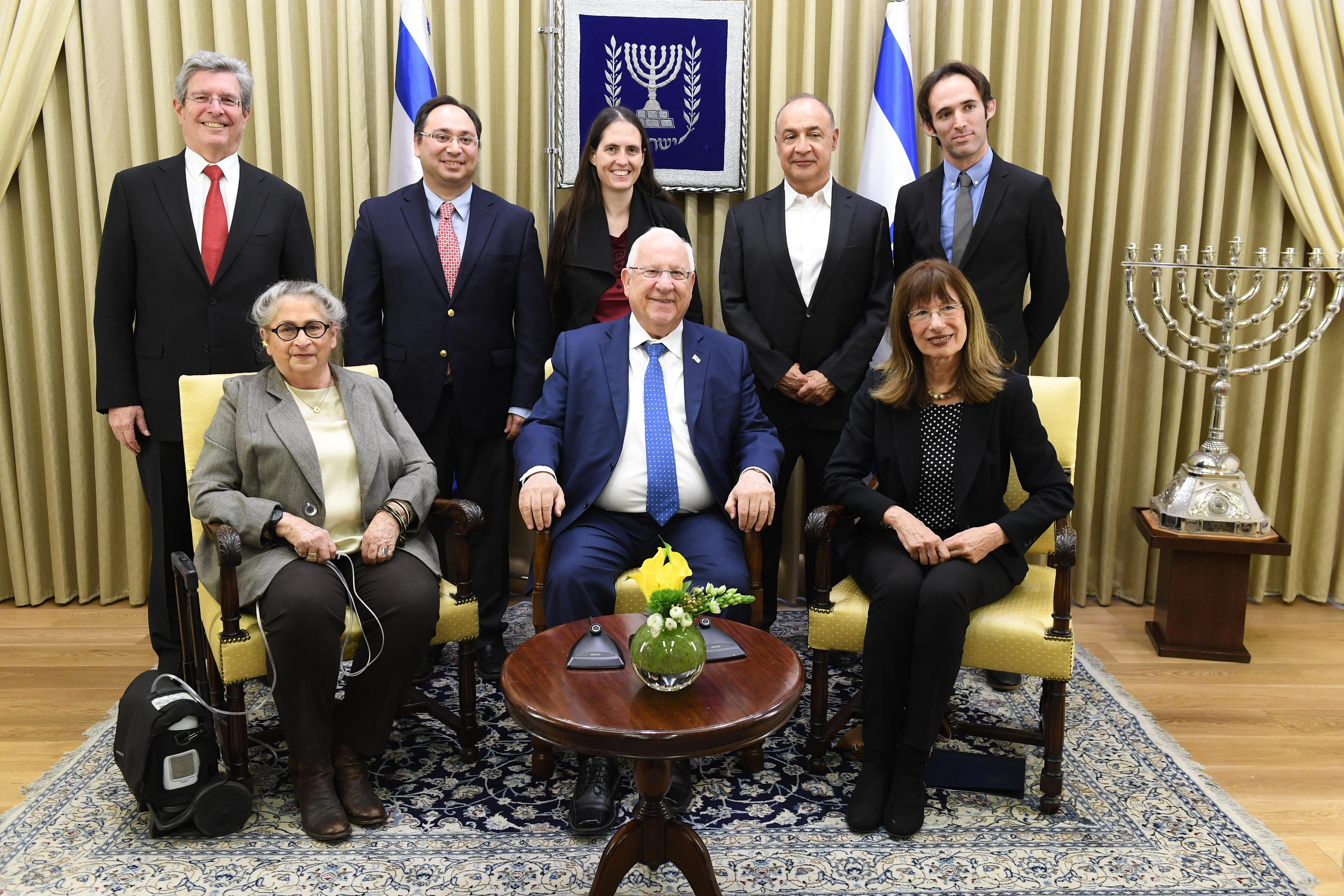
Blavatnik and Israeli President Reuven Rivlin with young scientists who have been awarded the Blavatnik Awards for Young Scientists, February 2018

Blavatnik was a member of a WhatsApp group chat that existed from November 2023 until early May 2024 involving some of the United States' most powerful business leaders with the stated goals of "chang[ing] the narrative" in favor of Israel and "help[ing] win the war" on U.S. public opinion following Hamas's October 7th attack on Israel. Members of the group chat, which included Daniel Lubetzky, Daniel Loeb, and Joseph Sitt, discussed how they received private briefings by, and worked closely with, members of the Israeli government. Blavatnik and other members also participated in a video call in April 2024 with New York City Mayor, Eric Adams in an effort to, according to reporting by The Washington Post, "pressure Columbia's president and trustees to permit the mayor to send police to the campus". They also discussed making political donations to Adams; Blavatnik himself solicited donations from others in the group.

=== Relationship with Jeffrey Epstein ===
US Department of Justice documents show Blavatnik's name in correspondence with convicted sex offender Jeffrey Epstein spanning at least 2009 to 2017. Epstein sought favours from Blavatnik through his assistant, recommended him to others as an investor, and listed him on proposed guest lists for private gatherings including figures such as Ehud Barak, Henry Kissinger, and Larry Summers. When asked in 2017 by an associate if he knew any "adequate Russian oligarchs," Epstein named Blavatnik.

== Political donations ==
In 2011, Blavatnik donated to both US President Barack Obama and his Republican Party rival, former Massachusetts governor Mitt Romney.

Blavatnik is one of the largest donors to the Republican Party and, in 2015–2016, donated a total of $7.35 million to six Republican political candidates, including South Carolina Senator Lindsey Graham, Florida Senator Marco Rubio and Arizona Senator John McCain. In February 2016, Blavatnik donated over $1 million to an anti-Donald Trump GOP group. He also donated $1 million to the committee for the 2017 inauguration of Donald Trump. In August 2017, political scientist Bo Rothstein resigned from the Blavatnik School of Government out of opposition to Blavatnik's politics.

Blavatnik and his American wife, Emily, also donated to Democratic Party candidates Kamala Harris, Chuck Schumer, and Hillary Clinton.

In 2017, two senior Trump administration officials went on record as being lobbyists for Blavatnik's Access Industries.

Since April 2016, Blavatnik has contributed $383,000 to the Republican National Committee and $1 million to Trump's inauguration fund. These donations included $12,000 directed to Trump's legal fund. However, he did not give directly to the Trump 2016 presidential campaign. Between 2015 and 2017, Blavatnik contributed $3.5 million to Republican Senate Leader Mitch McConnell's super PAC.

Blavatnik donated $5,200 to the Pete Buttigieg 2020 presidential campaign and $5,600 to the Joe Biden 2020 presidential campaign.

== Philanthropy ==
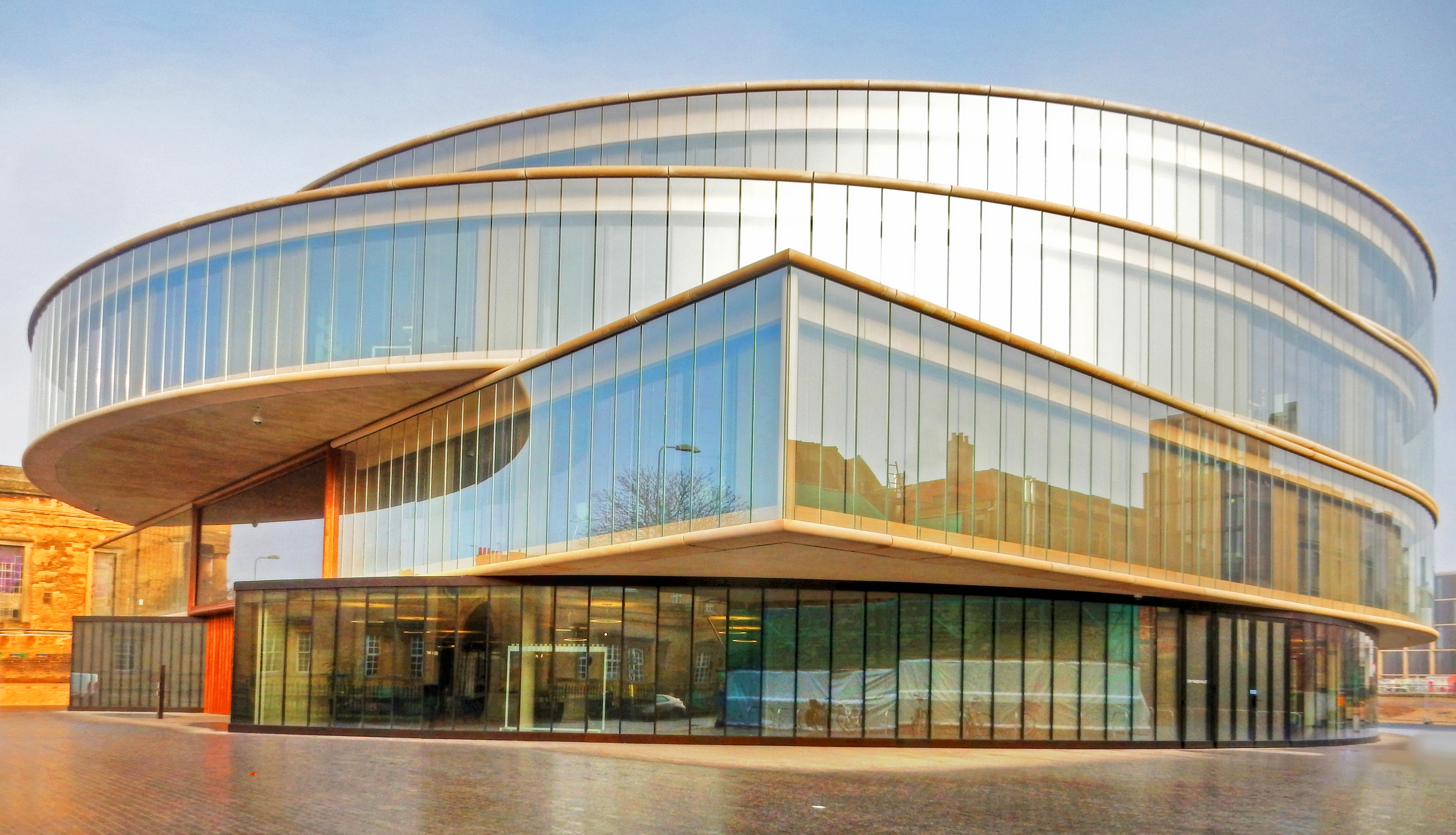
Blavatnik School of Government, Oxford

Blavatnik established the Blavatnik Family Foundation, which supports higher education, good governance, early-stage scientific research, arts and culture, and Jewish history.

Educational institutions supported by Blavatnik have included Yale University, Harvard University, and Oxford University. In 2011, Blavatnik donated more than £50 million to the Tate Modern gallery in London – the largest donation in the gallery's history. In 2017, the gallery named its new extension the Blavatnik Building.

Some critics, such as Ann Marlowe, have characterized his donations as influence-buying and whitewashing. A letter signed by 21 academic was published in The Guardian also criticizing Blavatnik's donations and Oxford University's decision to accept them.

== Board memberships ==
Blavatnik is a member of the Board of Trustees at Carnegie Hall, a member of the Board of Directors at 92NY and a member of the Board of Directors at the Center for Jewish History. He is also a member of the Harvard Medical School Board of Fellows, a member of the Council on Foreign Relations and a member of the Board of Governors at Tel Aviv University.

== Honours ==
In 2013, Blavatnik was made chevalier of the French Legion d'Honneur.

He was knighted by Queen Elizabeth II in the 2017 Birthday Honours for services to philanthropy.

== Personal life ==
Blavatnik is married to Emily Appelson Blavatnik. The couple have four children.

He owns a Grade II listed building in London on "the most expensive street in the world", Kensington Palace Gardens (number 15), which is valued at £200 million. He acquired the property in 2004. Other residents on the street include Israeli and Russian ambassadors. He also has a residence in Manhattan valued at more than $250 million.

Blavatnik holds British, American and Greek citizenship.

== See also ==
- Sunday Times Rich List 2017

== Notes and references ==
Notes
