= RatPac Entertainment =

American media company

RatPac Entertainment, LLC
- Logo used since 2014
- Type: Private
- Industry: Film; Media; Television
- Founded: 2004; 22 years ago
- Founders: Brett Ratner; James Packer
- Headquarters: Los Angeles, California, U.S.
- Area served: Worldwide
- Key people: Brett Ratner (CEO)
- Parent: Access Entertainment (2017–2018)
- Divisions: RatPac Television; RatPac Documentary Films
- Website: ratpacentertainment.com

RatPac Entertainment, LLC is an American media, entertainment and film production company that finances and produces motion pictures, television, documentaries, live theater and podcasts. The company is owned by Brett Ratner and James Packer.

== History ==
Dune Entertainment was a company founded by Steven Mnuchin in 2004.

Mnuchin founded Dune Entertainment as a side business. It financed a number of large-budget films, mostly for 20th Century Fox, including the X-Men film franchise and Avatar. In 2012, after Dune's deal with 20th Century Fox ended, Mnuchin worked with the filmmaker Brett Ratner and the Australian businessman James Packer to merge his Dune Entertainment company with Ratner and Packer's newly founded RatPac Entertainment joint venture, which would be formed into RatPac-Dune Entertainment in 2013 the following year.

Between 2013 and 2018, RatPac-Dune financed many films for Warner Bros., including American Sniper and Mad Max: Fury Road. Mnuchin was co-chairman of the trio's movie company, Relativity Media, but left seven months before it went bankrupt.

In September 2013, RatPac partnered with Dune Entertainment on a multi-year motion picture co-financing arrangement with Warner Bros., financing over $1 billion for 75 of the studio's films.

In December 2013, RatPac signed a deal starting as of January 1, 2014 to finance films as part of a production deal between Plan B Entertainment and New Regency.

RatPac Entertainment has co-financed 81 theatrically released motion pictures exceeding $17 billion in worldwide box office receipts. RatPac's co-financed films have been nominated for 59 Academy Awards, 25 Golden Globes and 43 BAFTAs and have won 25 Academy Awards, 8 Golden Globes and 24 BAFTAs.

In late 2017, Access Entertainment bought Packer's controlling stake in the company.

In 2021, Reddit r/wallstreetbets founder Jaime Rogozinski sold the rights to his life story to the company following the short squeeze of GameStop's stocks. The documentary The New Americans: Gaming a Revolution directed by Ondi Timoner debuted on Netflix on January 1, 2024.

== Dune Entertainment partnership ==
Dune Entertainment was led by Steven Mnuchin and had been co-financing Fox films since 2006. On March 17, 2006, Viacom agreed to sell a controlling interest in the DreamWorks Pictures live-action film library to Soros Strategic Partners and Dune Entertainment II. The sale was completed on May 8, 2006.

=== Dune Entertainment films ===
Produced with 20th Century Fox, Fox Searchlight Pictures, Fox Atomic and Fox 2000 Pictures as Dune Entertainment, Dune Entertainment LLC or Dune Entertainment III LLC.

- X-Men: The Last Stand (2006) (co-production with Marvel Entertainment and The Donners' Company)
- Garfield: A Tail of Two Kitties (2006) (co-production with Davis Entertainment and Ingenious Film Partners)
- The Devil Wears Prada (2006) (with Fox 2000 Pictures)
- John Tucker Must Die (2006) (co-production with Tall Trees)
- Borat (2006)
- Eragon (2006) (with Fox 2000 Pictures) (co-production with Davis Entertainment)
- Night at the Museum (2006) (co-production with 21 Laps Entertainment and 1492 Pictures)
- Pathfinder (2007)
- The Hills Have Eyes 2 (2007)
- Live Free or Die Hard (2007)
- Fantastic Four: Rise of the Silver Surfer (2007) (co-production with Marvel Entertainment, Constantin Film and 1492 Pictures)
- 28 Weeks Later (2007) (with Fox Atomic)
- The Darjeeling Limited (2007) (with Fox Searchlight Pictures)
- The Seeker: The Dark Is Rising (2007) (co-production with Walden Media)
- Hitman (2007)
- Alvin and the Chipmunks (2007) (with Fox 2000 Pictures) (co-production with Regency Enterprises, Cass Film and Bagdasarian Company)
- Aliens vs. Predator: Requiem (2007) (co-production with Davis Entertainment and Brandywine Productions)
- Choke (2008) (with Fox Searchlight Pictures)
- 27 Dresses (2008) (with Fox 2000 Pictures) (co-production with Spyglass Entertainment)
- Jumper (2008) (co-production with Regency Enterprises)
- Street Kings (2008) (with Fox Searchlight Pictures) (co-production with Regency Enterprises and 3 Arts Entertainment)
- What Happens in Vegas (2008) (co-production with Regency Enterprises, 21 Laps Entertainment and Mosaic Media Group)
- Meet Dave (2008) (co-production with Regency Enterprises, Friendly Films, Deep River Productions and Guy Walks Into a Bar Productions)
- The Happening (2008) (co-production with UTV Motion Pictures and Spyglass Entertainment)
- The X-Files: I Want to Believe (2008)
- Babylon A.D. (2008)
- The Secret Life of Bees (2008) (with Fox Searchlight Pictures) (co-production with Overbrook Entertainment and The Donners' Company)
- Max Payne (2008)
- Australia (2008)
- The Rocker (2008) (co-production with Fox Atomic and 21 Laps Entertainment)
- The Day the Earth Stood Still (2008) (co-production with 3 Arts Entertainment)
- Marley & Me (2008) (with Fox 2000 Pictures) (co-production with Regency Enterprises and Sunswept Entertainment)
- Bride Wars (2009) (with Fox 2000 Pictures) (co-production with Regency Enterprises, New Regency, Birdie and Riche Ludwig)
- Dragonball Evolution (2009)
- X-Men Origins: Wolverine (2009) (co-production with Marvel Entertainment, The Donners' Company and Seed Productions)
- Night at the Museum: Battle of the Smithsonian (2009) (co-production with 21 Laps Entertainment and 1492 Pictures)
- Aliens in the Attic (2009) (co-production with Regency Enterprises and Josephson Entertainment)
- Post Grad (2009) (co-production with Fox Atomic and The Montecito Picture Company)
- I Love You, Beth Cooper (2009) (co-production with Fox Atomic and 1492 Pictures)
- All About Steve (2009) (with Fox 2000 Pictures) (co-production with Fortis Films)
- Whip It (2009) (with Fox Searchlight Pictures) (co-production with Flower Films)
- Jennifer's Body (2009) (co-production with Fox Atomic)
- Amelia (2009) (with Fox Searchlight Pictures)
- Crazy Heart (2009) (with Fox Searchlight Pictures)
- Avatar (2009) (co-production with Lightstorm Entertainment)
- Alvin and the Chipmunks: The Squeakquel (2009) (with Fox 2000 Pictures) (co-production with Regency Enterprises, Bagdasarian Company and Tall Trees)
- Tooth Fairy (2010) (co-production with Walden Media, Blumhouse and Mayhem Pictures)
- Percy Jackson & the Olympians: The Lightning Thief (2010) (with Fox 2000 Pictures) (co-production with 1492 Pictures and Sunswept Entertainment)
- Our Family Wedding (2010) (with Fox Searchlight Pictures)
- Diary of a Wimpy Kid (2010) (with Fox 2000 Pictures) (co-production with Color Force)
- Date Night (2010) (co-production with 21 Laps Entertainment)
- Just Wright (2010) (with Fox Searchlight Pictures)
- Marmaduke (2010) (co-production with Regency Enterprises and Davis Entertainment)
- Cyrus (2010) (with Fox Searchlight Pictures) (co-production with Scott Free Productions)
- The A-Team (2010) (co-production with Scott Free Productions, Top Cow Productions and Stephen J. Cannell)
- Knight and Day (2010) (co-production with Regency Enterprises and Pink Machine)
- Ramona and Beezus (2010) (with Fox 2000 Pictures) (co-production with Walden Media)
- Predators (2010) (co-production with Troublemaker Studios and Davis Entertainment)
- Wall Street: Money Never Sleeps (2010)
- Love & Other Drugs (2010) (with Fox 2000 Pictures) (co-production with Regency Enterprises, New Regency, Stuber Pictures and Bedford Falls Productions)
- Machete (2010) (co-production with Troublemaker Studios)
- 127 Hours (2010) (with Fox Searchlight Pictures) (co-production with Everest Entertainment)
- Black Swan (2010) (with Fox Searchlight Pictures) (co-production with Cross Creek Pictures and Phoenix Pictures)
- Unstoppable (2010) (co-production with Scott Free Productions)
- The Chronicles of Narnia: The Voyage of the Dawn Treader (2010) (with Fox 2000 Pictures) (co-production with Walden Media)
- Gulliver's Travels (2010) (co-production with Davis Entertainment)
- Win Win (2011) (with Fox Searchlight Pictures)
- Diary of a Wimpy Kid: Rodrick Rules (2011) (with Fox 2000 Pictures) (co-production with Color Force)
- Water for Elephants (2011) (with Fox 2000 Pictures) (co-production with 3 Arts Entertainment)
- X-Men: First Class (2011) (Co-production with Marvel Entertainment, Bad Hat Harry Productions and The Donners' Company)
- Mr. Popper's Penguins (2011) (co-production with Davis Entertainment)
- Monte Carlo (2011) (with Fox 2000 Pictures) (co-production with Regency Enterprises and Di Novi Pictures)
- Rise of the Planet of the Apes (2011) (co-production with Chernin Entertainment)
- The Big Year (2011) (with Fox 2000 Pictures) (co-production with Red Hour Films, Sunswept Entertainment, and Deuce Three)
- The Sitter (2011) (co-production with Michael De Luca Productions)
- Alvin and the Chipmunks: Chipwrecked (2011) (with Fox 2000 Pictures) (co-production with Regency Enterprises and Bagdasarian Company)
- We Bought a Zoo (2011) (co-production with Vinyl Films and LBI Entertainment)
- Chronicle (2012) (co-production with Davis Entertainment)
- This Means War (2012) (co-production with Overbrook Entertainment)
- Prometheus (2012) (co-production with Scott Free Productions)
- Abraham Lincoln: Vampire Hunter (2012)
- The Watch (2012) (co-production with 21 Laps Entertainment)
- Diary of a Wimpy Kid: Dog Days (2012) (with Fox 2000 Pictures) (co-production with Color Force)
- Chasing Mavericks (2012) (with Fox 2000 Pictures) (co-production with Walden Media and Deuce Three Productions)
- Life of Pi (2012) (with Fox 2000 Pictures)
- Lincoln (2012) (co-production with Touchstone Pictures, DreamWorks Pictures, Reliance Entertainment, Participant Media, Amblin Entertainment and The Kennedy/Marshall Company)
- Parental Guidance (2012) (co-production with Walden Media, Chernin Entertainment and Face Productions)

== RatPac-Dune Entertainment partnership ==
RatPac-Dune Entertainment, LLC was formed in September 2013 by RatPac and Dune with a multi-year 75-picture co-financing arrangement with Warner Bros. Pictures. On November 26, 2013, RatPac-Dune finalized a $300 million credit facility with a group of banks, led by Bank of America Merrill Lynch, that has an option to be extended to $400 million. The company is the result of a 2013 joint venture between RatPac Entertainment and Dune Entertainment, following a collapse in negotiations between Dune and 20th Century Fox – which led the company to close a deal with Warner Bros. Pictures instead, replacing Legendary Pictures as Warner Bros.'s key co-financing partner.

In November 2018, RatPac-Dune's minority ownership stake in a library of 76 Warner Bros. films was put for sale, with investors in the fund backing the library to cash out. Vine Alternative Investments made a high bid for the library, but in January 2019, Warner Bros. exercised its rights to match the bid for the library, and essentially acquired RatPac-Dune's stakes for an estimated $290–300 million. The 75-picture deal passively covered all movies including those from another production financing deal with Village Roadshow Pictures, with films from Metro-Goldwyn-Mayer, Legendary Pictures, all Alcon Entertainment films between 2014 and 2017 and the 2016 film Fantastic Beasts and Where to Find Them all being exceptions.

=== RatPac-Dune Entertainment films ===
Financed with Warner Bros. Pictures

- Gravity (2013) (co-production with Heyday Films)
- Grudge Match (2013) (co-production with Gerber Pictures)
- The Lego Movie (2014) (with Warner Animation Group) (co-production with Village Roadshow Pictures, Lego System A/S, Vertigo Entertainment and Lin Pictures)
- Winter's Tale (2014) (co-production with Village Roadshow Pictures and Weed Road Pictures)
- Blended (2014) (co-production with Happy Madison Productions, Flower Films and Gulfstream Pictures)
- Edge of Tomorrow (2014) (co-production with Village Roadshow Pictures)
- Jersey Boys (2014) (co-production with GK Films)
- Tammy (2014) (with New Line Cinema) (co-production with Gary Sanchez Productions)
- Into the Storm (2014) (with New Line Cinema) (co-production with Village Roadshow Pictures)
- This Is Where I Leave You (2014) (co-production with Spring Creek Pictures and 21 Laps Entertainment)
- Annabelle (2014) (with New Line Cinema)
- The Judge (2014) (co-production with Village Roadshow Pictures)
- Inherent Vice (2014) (co-production with IAC Films and Ghoulardi Film Company)
- Horrible Bosses 2 (2014) (with New Line Cinema)
- American Sniper (2014) (co-production with Village Roadshow Pictures)
- Jupiter Ascending (2015) (co-production with Village Roadshow Pictures)
- Focus (2015) (co-production with Overbrook Entertainment and Di Novi Pictures)
- Run All Night (2015) (co-production with Vertigo Entertainment)
- Get Hard (2015) (co-production with Gary Sanchez Productions)
- The Water Diviner (2015) (U.S. distribution only)
- Mad Max: Fury Road (2015) (co-production with Village Roadshow Pictures and Kennedy Miller Mitchell)
- San Andreas (2015) (with New Line Cinema) (co-production with Village Roadshow Pictures)
- Entourage (2015) (co-production with HBO Films)
- Magic Mike XXL (2015)
- The Gallows (2015) (with New Line Cinema) (co-production with Blumhouse Productions; uncredited)
- Vacation (2015) (with New Line Cinema)
- The Man from U.N.C.L.E. (2015)
- Black Mass (2015) (co-production with Cross Creek Pictures)
- The Intern (2015)
- Pan (2015) (co-production with Berlanti Productions)
- Our Brand Is Crisis (2015) (co-production with Participant Media and Smokehouse Pictures)
- In the Heart of the Sea (2015) (co-production with Village Roadshow Pictures, Roth Films, Spring Creek Pictures and Imagine Entertainment)
- How to Be Single (2016) (with New Line Cinema) (co-production with Metro-Goldwyn-Mayer)
- Midnight Special (2016)
- Batman v Superman: Dawn of Justice (2016) (co-production with DC Entertainment, Cruel and Unusual Films and Atlas Entertainment)
- Keanu (2016) (with New Line Cinema) (co-production with Monkeypaw Productions and Principato-Young Entertainment)
- Central Intelligence (2016) (with New Line Cinema) (co-production with Universal Pictures, Perfect World Pictures, Bluegrass Films and Principato-Young Entertainment; U.S. distribution only)
- The Conjuring 2 (2016) (with New Line Cinema)
- The Legend of Tarzan (2016) (co-production with Village Roadshow Pictures, Jerry Weintraub Productions, and Dark Horse Entertainment)
- Lights Out (2016) (with New Line Cinema) (co-production with Atomic Monster and Grey Matter Productions)
- Suicide Squad (2016) (co-production with DC Films and Atlas Entertainment)
- War Dogs (2016) (co-production with Joint Effort and The Mark Gordon Company)
- Sully (2016) (co-production with Village Roadshow Pictures, The Kennedy/Marshall Company, Flashlight Films and Malpaso Productions)
- Storks (2016) (with Warner Animation Group) (co-production with Stoller Global Productions)
- The Accountant (2016)
- Live by Night (2016)
- Collateral Beauty (2016) (with New Line Cinema) (co-production with Village Roadshow Pictures, Overbrook Entertainment, Anonymous Content, PalmStar Media and Likely Story)
- The Lego Batman Movie (2017) (with Warner Animation Group) (co-production with DC Entertainment, Lego System A/S, Vertigo Entertainment, Lin Pictures and Lord Miller Productions)
- Going in Style (2017) (with New Line Cinema) (co-production with Village Roadshow Pictures)
- Fist Fight (2017) (with New Line Cinema) (co-production with Village Roadshow Pictures, 21 Laps Entertainment, and Rickard Pictures)
- CHiPs (2017) (co-production with Panay Films and Primate Pictures)
- Unforgettable (2017) (co-production with Di Novi Pictures)
- King Arthur: Legend of the Sword (2017) (co-production with Village Roadshow Pictures and Weed Road Pictures)
- Wonder Woman (2017) (co-production with DC Films, Atlas Entertainment and Cruel and Unusual Films)
- The House (2017) (with New Line Cinema) (co-production with Village Roadshow Pictures, Gary Sanchez Productions and Good Universe)
- Dunkirk (2017) (co-production with Syncopy Inc.)
- Annabelle: Creation (2017) (with New Line Cinema, Atomic Monster and The Safran Company)
- It (2017) (with New Line Cinema) (co-production with Vertigo Entertainment, Lin Pictures and KatzSmith Productions)
- The Lego Ninjago Movie (2017) (with Warner Animation Group) (co-production with Lego System A/S, Vertigo Entertainment, Lin Pictures and Lord Miller Productions)
- Geostorm (2017) (co-production with Electric Entertainment and Skydance Media)

Financed with Regency Enterprises and 20th Century Fox

- Aloha (2015) (co-production with Columbia Pictures, LStar Capital and Vinyl Films; Fox handles international distribution only)
- The Revenant (2015) (co-production with New Regency, Appian Way, Anonymous Content and M Productions)
- Rules Don't Apply (2016) (co-production with New Regency, Worldview Entertainment and Shangri-La Entertainment)
- Assassin's Creed (2016) (co-production with Ubisoft Motion Pictures, New Regency, DMC Films and The Kennedy/Marshall Company)

Financed with Universal Pictures

- The Water Diviner (2015) (co-production with Entertainment One, Mister Smith Entertainment, Seven Network, Hopscotch Features and Fear of God Films)
- Central Intelligence (2016) (co-production with New Line Cinema, Perfect World Pictures, Bluegrass Films and Principato-Young Entertainment; international distribution only)

Financed with Sony Pictures

- Aloha (2015) (with Columbia Pictures) (co-production with Regency Enterprises, LStar Capital and Vinyl Films; U.S. distribution only)
- Truth (2015) (with Sony Pictures Classics) (co-production with Echo Lake Entertainment, Blue Lake Media Fund, Mythology Entertainment and Dirty Films)
- I Saw the Light (2016) (with Sony Pictures Classics) (co-production with Bron Studios and CW Media Finance)
- Land of Mine (2016) (with Sony Pictures Classics) (studio credit only; produced by Nordisk Film and Amusement Park Film)

Financed with RKO Pictures

- Barely Lethal (2015)

== RatPac Documentary Films ==
- I Knew It Was You: Rediscovering John Cazale (2009)
- Night Will Fall (2014)
- Electric Boogaloo: The Wild, Untold Story of Cannon Films (2014)
- One Day Since Yesterday: Peter Bogdanovich & the Lost American Film (2014)
- Chuck Norris vs Communism (2015)
- The 100 Years How (2015)
- By Sidney Lumet (2015)
- In the Name of Honor (2015)
- S Is For Stanley (2015)
- Before the Flood (2016)
- Bright Lights: Starring Carrie Fisher and Debbie Reynolds (2016)
- Author: The JT LeRoy Story (2016)
- The New Americans: Gaming a Revolution (2023)
- The Noble Guardian (2025)
- Melania (2026)

== RatPac Television ==
- Rush Hour (2016) (with Warner Bros. Television)
