= 2004 in Wales =

- Centuries: 19th; 20th; 21st
- Decades: 1980s; 1990s; 2000s; 2010s; 2020s
- See also: List of years in Wales; Timeline of Welsh history 2004 in The United Kingdom England Scotland Elsewhere Welsh football: 2003–04 • 2004–05

This article is about the particular significance of the year 2004 to Wales and its people.

== Incumbents ==
- First Minister – Rhodri Morgan
- Secretary of State for Wales – Peter Hain
- Archbishop of Wales – Barry Morgan, Bishop of Llandaff
- Archdruid of the National Eisteddfod of Wales
  - Robyn Llŷn (outgoing)
  - Selwyn Iolen (incoming)

== Events ==
- 6 January – An inquest is opened into the death of Diana, Princess of Wales.
- 19 January – The jury at the inquest into the death of 12-year-old Stuart Cunningham-Jones, killed in a school bus crash near Cowbridge in December 2002, rules that this death was an accident, caused by "interference with the steering wheel" by other children on the bus.
- 23 February – The former Welsh Secretary Ron Davies announces he is joining the new Forward Wales party led by John Marek.
- 1 March
  - The Prince of Wales visits the Vale of Glamorgan and attends a special service in Cowbridge.
  - Cardiff is granted Fairtrade City status.
- 13 March – The market town of Cowbridge celebrates the 750th anniversary of its charter.
- 15 March – A second bridge over the river Monnow is opened in Monmouth.
- 31 March
  - The Taith Joint Board is established, to develop and implement actions and strategies for transport in north Wales.
  - The National Woollen Museum re-opens at Dre-fach Felindre.
- 28 April – The Wales Trades Union Congress annual conference opens at Llandudno.
- 15 May – Singer James Fox represents the UK in the Eurovision Song Contest, finishing 16th.
- 18 May – Denbighshire becomes the first local authority in Wales to ban smoking on all council property and for all its workers.
- 28 May
  - Technology Wales 2004 opens at the Celtic Manor Resort, Newport.
  - Guardian Hay Festival, annual literary festival, opens at Hay-on-Wye.
- 31 May – The Urdd National Eisteddfod opens at Llangefni.
- May – Ospreys in Britain: First ospreys in modern times breed in Wales, at the site which becomes the Glaslyn Osprey Project (where the chicks do not survive), followed by another pair near Welshpool (one chick reared successfully).
- 4 June – Professor Merfyn Jones is named as the new Vice Chancellor of the University of Wales, Bangor.
- 6 June – Rhodri Morgan, the First Minister of Wales is criticized for not attending celebrations to mark the 60th anniversary of D-Day.
- 10 June – As a result of the local elections, there is power sharing in nine councils across Wales, Labour control in eight, Independents in three, and Plaid Cymru and the Conservatives control one each.
- 24 June – Police in Swansea arrest twenty people on charges of drug dealing.
- 2 July – Jeffrey John, an openly gay clergyman originally from Tonyrefail, is inducted as Dean of St Albans.
- 6 July
  - The International Musical Eisteddfod opens in Llangollen.
  - The Queen unveils the memorial fountain erected in London in memory of Diana, Princess of Wales.
- 14 July
  - The National Assembly for Wales brings the Wales Tourist Board, Welsh Development Agency and ELWa under its immediate control.
- 19 July – The Royal Welsh Show opens at Builth Wells, celebrating its centenary.
- 28 July – It is announced that the North East Wales Institute of Higher Education, Swansea Institute of Higher Education, Trinity College, Carmarthen and the Royal Welsh College of Music & Drama will all become part of the University of Wales.
- 30 July – The National Eisteddfod of Wales opens at Tredegar House near Newport.
- 12 August – The Keep Cardiff Tidy campaign wins a special merit award at the Association of Public Service Excellence Awards 2004.
- 26 August – The Festival of History in North Wales opens in Llanfairfechan.
- 28 August – Bryn Terfel's Faenol Festival opens.
- 7 September – Kalan Kawa Karim, an Iraqi Kurd, dies after what police take to be a racist attack in Swansea city centre.
- 7 October – The Western Mail changes from broadsheet to tabloid/compact format.
- 8 October – Breconshire Brewery wins the "Champion Beer of Wales" competition at the Campaign for Real Ale (CAMRA) Great Welsh Beer Festival in Cardiff.
- 26 October – The Monmouth-based inventor, Andrew Hubert von Staufer, wins the Platinum Award for Design and Gold Award for Leisure at the British Invention Show.
- 1 November – Neil Kinnock becomes head of the British Council.
- 2 November – Flights to Egypt become available for the first time from Cardiff International Airport.
- 8 November – The Welsh Assembly Government launches its "free swimming for over-60s" pilot scheme.
- 19 November – The Wales Children in Need concert is held at Wrexham, starring Bryan Adams.
- 26 November – Official opening of the Wales Millennium Centre in Cardiff
- 31 December – In the New Year Honours List, author Leslie Thomas is made an OBE for services to literature.

== Arts and literature ==
- 23 March – The National Library of Wales successfully bids for an 18th-century Welsh manuscript auctioned in Los Angeles.
- 5 April – Launch of Katherine Jenkins' first album, Première.
- May – Foundation of Swansea City Opera company.
- 17 August – Announcement of the Dylan Thomas Prize, a new £60,000 literary prize. The first award will be made in 2006.
- November
  - Roger Rees is appointed artistic director of the Williamstown Theatre Festival in Williamstown, Massachusetts.
  - Welsh National Opera moves into the Wales Millennium Centre.
- 7 December – The Stereophonics introduce their new drummer, Argentinian Javier Weyler.
- Magenta wins the Classic Rock Society award for Best Live Band. Christina Booth wins Best Female Vocalist.

=== Awards ===
- Glyndŵr Award – Peter Prendergast
- National Eisteddfod of Wales: Chair – Huw Meirion Edwards
- National Eisteddfod of Wales: Crown – Jason Walford Davies
- National Eisteddfod of Wales: Prose Medal – Annes Glyn
- National Eisteddfod of Wales: Music Medal – Owain Llwyd
- Wales Book of the Year:
  - English language: Niall Griffiths, Stump
  - Welsh language: Jerry Hunter, Llwch Cenhedloedd
- Gwobr Goffa Daniel Owen – Robin Llywelyn, Un Diwrnod yn yr Eisteddfod
- John Tripp Award for Spoken Poetry: Clare Potter

=== New books ===
==== Welsh language ====
- Hywel Teifi Edwards – O'r pentre gwyn i Gwmderi
- Bethan Gwanas – Hi yw fy Ffrind
- Eirug Wyn – Dyn yn y Cefn Heb Fwstash

==== English language ====
- Peter Finch – Real Cardiff
- Niall Griffiths – Stump
- Mererid Hopwood – Singing in Chains: Listening to Welsh Verse
- Rhys Hughes – A New Universal History of Infamy
- Jon Ronson – The Men Who Stare at Goats

=== Music ===
- Karl Jenkins – In These Stones Horizons Sing
- Katell Keineg – July
- Alun Tan Lan – Aderyn Papur
- Lostprophets – Start Something
- Manic Street Preachers – Lifeblood
- Richard Rees – Y Baswr o Bennal (posthumous album release)
- Tom Jones and Jools Holland (album)
- Tystion – Miwsig I'ch Traed A Miwsig I'ch Meddwl

== Film ==
- Ioan Gruffudd stars as Lancelot in King Arthur.
- I'll Sleep When I'm Dead is filmed partly in Fishguard.
- The Libertine is filmed partly at Tretower Court.

=== Welsh-language films ===
- Dal: Yma/Nawr, with John Cale, Ioan Gruffudd, Guto Harri, Cerys Matthews, Siân Phillips

== Broadcasting ==
- 3 May – A new community radio station, WHAM! RADIO 1449, is launched in Blaenavon.
- 16 July – The filming of a new Doctor Who series begins in Cardiff.
- 28 July – S4C and the Royal Welsh Agricultural Society sign a deal guaranteeing nationwide TV coverage of the Royal Welsh Show for the next five years.
- 17 October – Pobol y Cwm, the Welsh language soap opera, celebrates its thirtieth anniversary by receiving a "Hall of Fame" award from the Royal Television Society.
- November – Bread of Heaven, a series of six programmes about the history of religion in Wales, presented by Huw Edwards, begins its run on BBC 1 Wales.
- November–December – Mine All Mine, written by Russell T Davies and starring Griff Rhys Jones.
- Rob Brydon stars in The Keith Barret Show.

=== Welsh-language television ===
- Alex Jones presents the first series of Hip neu Sgip?
- Ralïo

== Sport ==
- 4 June – Simon Khan breaks the course record at the Celtic Manor Wales Open golf tournament.
- 24 June – Joe Calzaghe pulls out of scheduled world title fight against Glen Johnson because of injury.
- 30 August – The 19th World Bog Snorkelling Championships are held at Llanwrtyd Wells.
- 15 September – Mark Hughes resigns as manager of the Welsh national team after being appointed manager of Blackburn Rovers.
- 16 September – The Wales Rally GB begins in Cardiff.
- 17 September – The 2004 Paralympics open in Athens: Welsh athletes will return home with twelve gold, six silver and nine bronze medals.
- 9 October – The Wales national football team loses 2–0 to England at Old Trafford in Manchester.
- 12 November – John Toshack becomes the new manager of the Wales national football team.
- 20 November – The Wales rugby union side loses 25–26 to New Zealand at the Millennium Stadium, Cardiff.
- 3 December – Wrexham A.F.C. goes into administration.
- BBC Wales Sports Personality of the Year – Tanni Grey-Thompson

== Deaths ==
- 3 January – T. G. Jones, footballer, 86
- 5 January – Vivian Jenkins, rugby player, 92
- 21 January – John T. Lewis, mathemategydd, 71
- 22 January – Islwyn Ffowc Elis, author, 79
- 5 February – Nicholas Evans, artist, 97
- 21 February – John Charles, footballer, 72
- 29 March – Eifion Jones, marine botanist, 79
- 4 April – Alwyn Williams, geologist, 82
- 5 April – Gweneth Lilly, writer and teacher, 83
- 17 April – Geraint Howells, politician, 79
- 25 April – Eirug Wyn, author, 53 (myeloma)
- May – Cyril Kieft, racing driver and sportscar manufacturer, 92
- 20 May – Dennis Coslett, Free Wales Army activist, 64
- 2 June – Alun Richards, novelist, 74
- 9 June – Harry Harris, footballer, 70
- 15 June
  - J. Gwyn Griffiths, poet, Egyptologist and nationalist political activist, 92
  - John Lasarus Williams, nationalist activist, 79
- 17 July – Sir Julian Hodge, banker, 99
- 18 July – Emrys Evans, banker
- 29 July – Linford Rees, psychiatrist, 89
- 5 August – Jim Alford, athlete, 90
- 8 August – Richard Taylor, skater and skier, 23 (injuries from skating accident)
- 20 August – Arthur Lever, footballer, 84
- 1 September – Gordon Parry, Baron Parry, 78
- 10 September – Glyn Owen, actor, 76
- 15 September – Sue Noake, athletics official
- 20 September – Bill Shortt, footballer, 83
- 25 September – Michael Treharne Davies, Catholic writer, 68
- 13 October – Bernice Rubens, novelist, 76
- 21 October – Brinley Rees, academic, 84
- 9 November – Emlyn Hughes, English footballer of Welsh parentage, 57 (brain cancer)
- 14 November – David Stanley Evans, astronomer, 88
- 15 November – John Morgan, comedian, 74
- 25 November – John St. Bodfan Gruffydd, landscape architect, 94
- 29 November – Jonah Jones, sculptor, writer, and educationist, 85
- 4 December – Sir Anthony Meyer, politician, 84
- 14 December – Harry Bowcott, international rugby player and president of the Welsh Rugby Union, 97

== See also ==
- 2004 in Northern Ireland
