= 2005 in Wales =

- Centuries: 19th; 20th; 21st
- Decades: 1980s; 1990s; 2000s; 2010s; 2020s
- See also: List of years in Wales; Timeline of Welsh history 2005 in The United Kingdom England Scotland Elsewhere Welsh football: 2004–05 • 2005–06

This article is about the particular significance of the year 2005 to Wales and its people.

== Incumbents ==
- First Minister – Rhodri Morgan
- Secretary of State for Wales – Peter Hain
- Archbishop of Wales – Barry Morgan, Bishop of Llandaff
- Archdruid of the National Eisteddfod of Wales – Selwyn Iolen

== Events ==
- 10 January – Jane Hutt loses her job as Health Minister in the Welsh Assembly Government, a post she has held since 1999. She is replaced by Dr Brian Gibbons. First Minister Rhodri Morgan denies it is a dismissal, and moves Hutt to the post of Business Minister.
- 22 January – The Tsunami Relief concert held at the Millennium Stadium, Cardiff – the largest live music event in the UK since Live Aid. Performers included Eric Clapton, Jools Holland, Manic Street Preachers, Lulu, Aled Jones, Kelly Jones, Charlotte Church, Katherine Jenkins, Feeder, Snow Patrol, Liberty X, Craig David, Heather Small, Keane.
- 14 February – An earthquake with a strength of 3.8 is felt in Llandudno.
- April – Launch of Audiences Wales.
- 2 April – First Minister Rhodri Morgan travels to Vietnam to take part in a trade mission.
- 9 April – As announced on 10 February, the Prince of Wales (now Charles III) marries Camilla Parker Bowles; however, she uses the style HRH The Duchess of Cornwall rather than Princess of Wales.
- 27 April – March Networks, a company founded by Sir Terry Matthews, makes an initial public offering.
- 5 May – In the 2005 United Kingdom general election, the Labour Party retains its national majority but the Conservative Party wins three Welsh constituencies, the first time since 1997 that they have held any parliamentary seats in Wales, and the former Labour MP Peter Law retains his Blaenau Gwent constituency standing as an independent. In the new Cabinet, Paul Murphy is replaced as Secretary of State for Northern Ireland.
- 6 May – Welsh Secretary, Peter Hain, makes a public apology to soprano Katherine Jenkins for using her image on election leaflets without her permission. Following the general election, Hain is also appointed Secretary of State for Northern Ireland, whilst retaining his Wales appointment.
- 13 June – Poet Dannie Abse is injured and his wife Joan is killed in an accident on the M4 in South Wales.
- 17 June – Gwenno Mair Davies is presented with the Crown of the Urdd National Eisteddfod at a ceremony in Caernarfon, after the original winner, Llinos Dafydd, hands it back amid accusations of plagiarism.
- 21 June – A new exhibition, "Cardiff's Century", opens to commemorate its first hundred years as a city.
- 29 June – Aspers is selected as the casino operator to invest in Cardiff's planned new £700 million International Sports Village.
- July – A rare sooty tern is spotted in the Skerries, Anglesey.
- 10 July – The Liberty Stadium opens in Swansea. On 23 July, Swansea City A.F.C. play their first match here; it is also home to the Ospreys (rugby union) team.
- 13 July – The Prince of Wales opens a new building to house the Narrow Gauge Railway Museum at Tywyn Wharf railway station, Gwynedd.
- 30 July – An anti-racism rally is held in Cardiff as a result of an attack on the Shah Jalal Mosque and Islamic Cultural Centre.
- 5 August – Aled Jones is among those admitted to the Gorsedd of bards.
- 16 September – 2005 South Wales E. coli O157 outbreak first identified in Merthyr Tydvil.
- 17–18 October – National Waterfront Museum opens in Swansea.
- 19 October – Liverpool City Council issues a formal apology for the flooding of the Tryweryn valley to create the reservoir of Llyn Celyn during the 1950s.
- 28 October – Cardiff celebrates its centenary as a city.
- November – Swansea University announces its new Institute of Advanced Telecommunications (IAT).
- 1 November – The Prince of Wales and The Duchess of Cornwall arrive in the United States for their first overseas visit since their marriage.
- 1 December – The village of Ystradfellte is connected to mains electricity, probably the last in Wales to be wired.
- 20 December – On his first visit to Wales as Leader of the Opposition, David Cameron states that "devolution is here to stay".
- Trinity College, Carmarthen, becomes part of the University of Wales.
- A Welsh language version of Scrabble is marketed for the first time.

== Arts and literature ==
- January
  - Karl Jenkins is awarded the OBE in the New Year's Honours List.
  - Sian Pearce becomes the first female musical director of the Morriston Orpheus Choir.
- 9 April – Celebration Fanfare by the Welsh composer Alun Hoddinott is performed at the wedding of the Prince of Wales.
- 17 April – Rhys Ifans wins the Best Actor award at the British Academy Television Awards. Michael Sheen is also nominated.
- May – Gwyneth Lewis becomes the first National Poet for Wales.
- 25 May – Katherine Jenkins's album Second Nature is named Album of the Year at the 2005 Classical BRIT Awards.
- 19 June – The American soprano Nicole Cabell wins the final of the Cardiff Singer of the World competition for 2005.
- 2 July – Katherine Jenkins and the Stereophonics perform in the Live8 concerts.
- November – Dawn, by Shreepali Patel, is awarded the D. M. Davies Award at the Cardiff Screen Festival.
- December – Connie Fisher makes her first professional theatre appearance in panto at Milford Haven Torch Theatre.
- Gillian Clarke is appointed Cardiff's first "Capital Poet".

=== Awards ===
- Glyndŵr Award – Dr John Davies
- National Eisteddfod of Wales: Chair – Tudur Dylan Jones
- National Eisteddfod of Wales: Crown – Christine James
- National Eisteddfod of Wales: Prose Medal – Dylan Iorwerth for Darnau
- National Eisteddfod of Wales: Drama Medal – Manon Steffan
- Gwobr Goffa Daniel Owen – Sian Eirian Rees Davies for I Fyd Sy Well
- Urdd National Eisteddfod: Chair – Hywel Meilyr Griffiths
- Urdd National Eisteddfod: Crown – Gwenno Mair Davies
- Wales Book of the Year:
  - English language: Owen Sheers, The Dust Diaries
  - Welsh language: Caryl Lewis – Martha Jac a Sianco

=== New books ===
==== Welsh language ====
- Geraint Griffiths & John Davies – Hewl
- Mererid Hopwood – Seren Lowri

==== English language ====
- Phil Carradice – Wales at War
- Richard Gwyn – The Colour of a Dog Running Away
- Gavin Henson – My Grand Slam Year
- Stefan Terlezki – From War to Westminster

== Music ==
Classical

- Jeffrey Lewis – Sacred Chants

Albums

- Feeder- Pushing The Senses
- Bullet for My Valentine – The Poison
- Charlotte Church – Tissues and Issues
- Dave Edmunds – Alive and Pickin' (album)
- The Gentle Good – Find Your Way Back Home (EP)
- Meinir Gwilym – Sgandal Fain
- Siân James – Y Ferch o Bedlam
- Llio Rhydderch – Gwenllian

Other

- Mal Pope – Amazing Grace (musical)
- Group 9 Bach formed

== Film ==
- Ioan Gruffudd stars in Fantastic Four.
- New Anglo-Welsh suspense film, The Dark, stars Sean Bean.

=== Welsh-language films ===
- Y Lleill, directed by Emyr Glyn Williams

== Television ==
- 1 March – S4C publishes its first Statement of Programme Policy.
- 21 March – BBC Wales announces major restructuring.
- 23 April – BAFTA Cymru awards ceremony held at Cardiff International Arena.
- 27 April – Gethin Jones makes his debut as a Blue Peter presenter.
- 31 May – Iona Jones is appointed S4C's new Chief Executive.

=== Welsh-language television ===
- Con Passionate (drama)
- Hacio (current affairs programme for young people)

=== English-language television ===
- Iolo's Welsh Safari 2005 presented by Iolo Williams
- Welsh Journeys (series 2) presented by Jamie Owen
- Big Welsh Challenge (series 1)
- Paul Rhys stars as Beethoven
- Doctor Who (revival) produced by Russell T Davies, made by BBC Wales (with location filming at Tredegar House)

== Sport ==
- BBC Wales Sports Personality of the Year – Gareth Thomas
- Cycling
  - 27 June – Julian Winn, former Olympic competitor, is named as the new Welsh cycling national coach.
- Rugby Union
  - 19 March – The Welsh national team defeats Ireland to win the Six Nations rugby tournament and secure its first "grand slam" since 1978.

== Deaths ==
- 19 January – Peter Dawson trade union leader, 64
- 23 January – Morys Bruce, 4th Baron Aberdare, 85
- 29 January – Eric Griffiths, musician, 64
- 24 February – Professor Sir Glanmor Williams, historian, 84
- 8 March – Alice Thomas Ellis, novelist, 72
- 26 March – James Callaghan, Lord Callaghan of Cardiff, former Cardiff MP and prime minister, 92
- 1 April – John Davies, cricketer, 79
- 2 April – Trevor Foster, Rugby league player, 90
- 21 April – Gwynfor Evans, first Plaid Cymru MP and leader of the party for 40 years, 92
- 16 May – Sir Rees Davies, historian, 66
- 17 May – John Griffith Vaughan, seed scientist, 79
- 22 May – Phil Clift, cricketer, 86
- 28 May – David Oswald Thomas, philosopher, 81
- 31 May – Martyn Davies, rugby player
- 19 June – Tich Gwilym, musician, 54
- 30 July – Derrick Morris, heart transplant survivor, 75
- 20 August – Clifford Williams, actor and director, 78
- 1 October – Peter Hubbard-Miles, politician, 78
- 3 October – Jeff Young, rugby player, 63
- 4 October – Mike Gibbins, Welsh musician and songwriter, 56
- 1 November – Lady Rose McLaren, socialite, 86
- 4 November – Wilfred Abse, psychoanalyst, 91
- 21 November – Aileen Fox, archaeologist and widow of Sir Cyril Fox, 98
