= 1995 in Wales =

- Centuries: 18th; 19th; 20th; 21st
- Decades: 1970s; 1980s; 1990s; 2000s; 2010s
- See also: List of years in Wales; Timeline of Welsh history 1995 in The United Kingdom England Scotland Elsewhere

This article is about the particular significance of the year 1995 to Wales and its people.

== Incumbents ==
- Secretary of State for Wales – John Redwood (until 26 June); David Hunt (Acting); William Hague (from 5 July)
- Archbishop of Wales – Alwyn Rice Jones, Bishop of St Asaph
- Archdruid of the National Eisteddfod of Wales – John Gwilym Jones

== Events ==
- 3 January – Tower Colliery re-opens under the ownership of the workforce buyout company Goitre Tower Anthracite.
- 1 February – Richey Edwards of the Manic Street Preachers disappears.
- 16 February – In the Islwyn by-election brought about by the resignation of Neil Kinnock, Don Touhig is elected as Labour MP for the constituency.
- April – TBI plc purchases Cardiff-Wales Airport from Glamorgan County Council.
- 20 July – Swansea-born Michael Heseltine becomes Deputy Prime Minister of the United Kingdom, an office last held by Geoffrey Howe.
- 30 July – Police in North Wales launch a murder inquiry after the body of seven-year-old Sophie Hook (who had gone missing from a nearby house during the night) is found on a beach near Llandudno by a man walking his dog.
- 6 August – Howard Hughes, a 30-year-old Colwyn Bay man, is charged with the murder of Sophie Hook.
- November – Diver Keith Hurley discovers the wreck of the submarine Resurgam (sunk 1880) off Rhyl.
- 20 November – The Princess of Wales gives a revealing interview to Martin Bashir for the Panorama current affairs television programme on BBC 1, discussing her personal problems and marriage in candid detail.
- 20 December – The Queen writes to The Prince and Princess of Wales urging them to divorce as soon as possible.
- Welsh historian Sir Rees Davies is appointed to the Chichele Chair of Medieval History in the University of Oxford.
- Welsh historian Glanmor Williams is knighted.

== Arts and literature ==
- Roger Rees is nominated for a Tony for Best Actor in a Play for his role in Indiscretions.
- Michael Ball performs in the Les Misérables tenth anniversary concert.
- Peter Karrie is voted the favourite Phantom of members of The Phantom of the Opera Appreciation Society for the second year in a row.
- The Dylan Thomas Centre, Swansea, is opened by Jimmy Carter.

=== Awards ===
- Glyndŵr Award – Kyffin Williams
- National Eisteddfod of Wales (held in Abergele)
- National Eisteddfod of Wales: Chair – Tudur Dylan Jones
- National Eisteddfod of Wales: Crown – Aled Gwyn
- National Eisteddfod of Wales: Prose Medal – Angharad Jones for Y Dylluan Wen
- Wales Book of the Year:
  - English language: Duncan Bush, Masks
  - Welsh language: Aled Islwyn, Unigolion, Unigeddau
- Gwobr Goffa Daniel Owen – Beryl Stafford Williams

=== New books ===
- Roger Boore – Y Bachgen Gwyllt
- Robin Llywelyn – Y Dwr Mawr Llwyd
- R. S. Thomas – No Truce with the Furies
- Aled Rhys Wiliam – Cywain

== Film ==
=== English-language films ===
- The Englishman Who Went Up a Hill But Came Down a Mountain, with Kenneth Griffith
- Restoration is partly filmed at Caerphilly Castle.

=== Welsh-language films ===
- Branwen

== Music ==
- Robin Huw Bowen – Harp Music of Wales (Cerddoriaeth Telyn Cymru)
- Carreg Lafar – Ysbryd y Werin
- Dafydd Iwan – Cân Celt
- Super Furry Animals – Llanfairpwllgwyngyllgogerychwyndrobwllantysiliogogogochynygofod (in space) (E.P.)
- Triskedekaphilia (compilation album)

== Broadcasting ==
- 30 September – 96.4 FM The Wave goes on air for the first time.

=== Welsh-language television ===
- A55, starring Iwan "Iwcs" Roberts
- Rownd a Rownd, a youth-oriented soap opera set and filmed around Menai Bridge, launches on S4C

=== English-language television ===
- John Rhys-Davies takes the lead in the new US drama series, Sliders.
- Somebody's Son (prizewinning documentary made for BBC2 and BBC Wales by Raw Charm).

== Sport ==
- BBC Wales Sports Personality of the Year – Neville Southall
- Rugby Union
  - 4 June – A narrow defeat by Ireland results in Wales being eliminated from the Rugby World Cup competition after only three matches.

== Births ==
- 5 January – Tom John, footballer
- 13 February – Leona Vaughan, actress
- 13 June – Anna Morris, cyclist
- 30 June – Declan John, footballer
- 4 July – Amy Hill, cyclist
- 9 October – Jasmine Joyce-Butchers, rugby player
- 12 October – Jordan Howe, Paralympic athlete
- 30 November – Seb Morris, racing driver

== Deaths ==
- 28 January – Philip Burton, theatre director and radio producer, 90
- 2 February - Raymond Bark-Jones, English-born Wales international rugby union player, 83
- 4 February - David Alexander, singer, 56
- 8 February – Don Devereux, dual-code rugby player, 62
- 8 February – Rachel Thomas, actress, 89
- 11 March – Myfanwy Talog, actress, 50
- 28 March - Julian Cayo-Evans, political activist, 57
- 10 April – Glyn Jones, poet, author and academic, 90
- 12 April – Cyril Sidlow, footballer, 89
- 21 April – Tessie O'Shea, entertainer, 82
- 21 June – Tristan Jones, sailor, 66
- 24 June – Len Blyth, Wales international rugby player, 74
- 25 September – Dave Bowen, footballer, 67
- 26 September – Lynette Roberts, poet, 86
- 5 December – Charles Evans, doctor and mountaineer, 77

== See also ==
- 1995 in Northern Ireland
