= 2003 in Wales =

- Centuries: 19th; 20th; 21st
- Decades: 1980s; 1990s; 2000s; 2010s; 2020s
- See also: List of years in Wales; Timeline of Welsh history 2003 in The United Kingdom England Scotland Elsewhere Welsh football: 2002–03 • 2003–04

This article is about the particular significance of the year 2003 to Wales and its people.

== Incumbents ==
- First Minister – Rhodri Morgan
- Secretary of State for Wales – Peter Hain
- Archbishop of Wales – Barry Morgan, Bishop of Llandaff (elected)
- Archdruid of the National Eisteddfod of Wales – Robyn Llŷn

== Events ==
- February – Former Conservative Assembly leader Rod Richards is declared bankrupt with debts estimated at over £300,000.
- 27 February – Rowan Williams is enthroned as Archbishop of Canterbury. Dominic Walker is installed as his replacement as Bishop of Monmouth.
- 9 March – Ron Davies announces that he is leaving politics after being asked to stand down by his local party following further revelations by the press about his private life.
- 29 March – Porthmadog Cob is bought by the Welsh Assembly Government and the road toll is discontinued after 192 years.
- 1 May – In the National Assembly for Wales election, Labour win 30 seats, enabling them to form a government. Following disappointing results for Plaid Cymru, Ieuan Wyn Jones stands down as party president and leader of the assembly group.
- 19 June – Prince William of Wales visits Bangor and Anglesey, to mark his 21st birthday (on 21 June).
- August
  - National Eisteddfod of Wales held at Meifod.
  - A memorial to Owain Lawgoch is unveiled at Mortagne-sur-Gironde, France.
- October – Dafydd Iwan, newly elected President of Plaid Cymru, escapes a driving ban for speeding offences on the grounds that he needs to drive to fulfil his musical and political engagements.
- 12 October – The Friends of the Leinster hold a service at Holyhead to commemorate the 85th anniversary of the sinking of RMS Leinster by a German U-boat.
- November – Michael Howard becomes leader of the Conservative Party.
- December
  - Dafydd Wigley is appointed Pro-Chancellor of the University of Wales.
  - Aberllefenni Slate Quarry ceases working.
- 7 December – The Wales & Borders train operating franchise is awarded for a 15-year period to Arriva Trains Wales.
- North Hoyle Offshore Wind Farm commences operation.
- The former Brains Brewery site in Cardiff is redeveloped into the 85,000 sq ft (7,900 m^{2}) "Old Brewery Quarter".
- Veteran Cardiff politician Stefan Terlezki goes to the European Parliament to press the case for eventual Ukrainian membership of the European Union.
- In Channel 4's 100 Worst Britons poll (which includes only living people), the following entries have Welsh connections:
  - H from Steps – 8
  - Charlotte Church – 21
  - The Prince of Wales (now Charles III) – 24
  - Catherine Zeta-Jones – 39
  - Lawrence Llewelyn-Bowen – 42
  - Vinnie Jones – 61
  - Tom Jones – 72
- The North Wales edition of the Daily Post separates from the Liverpool Daily Post.

== Arts and literature ==
=== Awards ===
- Glyndŵr Award – Elinor Bennett
- National Eisteddfod of Wales: Chair – Twm Morys
- National Eisteddfod of Wales: Crown – Mererid Hopwood
- National Eisteddfod of Wales: Prose Medal – Cefin Roberts
- National Eisteddfod of Wales: Music Medal – Owain Llwyd
- Wales Book of the Year:
  - English language: Sugar and Slate – Charlotte Williams
  - Welsh language: O! Tyn y Gorchudd – Hunangofiant Rebecca Jones – Angharad Price
- Gwobr Goffa Daniel Owen – Elfyn Pritchard, Pan ddaw'r dydd
- John Tripp Award for Spoken Poetry: Emily Hinshelwood

=== New books ===
==== English language ====
- Damian Walford Davies – Echoes to the Amen: Essays after R.S. Thomas
- Rhys Hughes – The Percolated Stars
- Bernice Rubens – The Sergeants' Tale
- Rowan Williams – Poems of Rowan Williams

==== Welsh language ====
- Bobi Jones – Beirniadaeth Gyfansawdd – Fframwaith Cyflawn Beirniadaeth Lenyddol
- Gerwyn Williams – Tafarn Tawelwch

== Music ==
=== Albums ===
- Huw Chiswell – Dere Nawr
- Elin Fflur – Dim Gair (No Words)
- Catrin Finch – Crossing the Stone
- Funeral for a Friend – Casually Dressed & Deep in Conversation
- Jakokoyak – Am Cyfan Dy Pethau Prydferth
- Karl Jenkins – Adiemus V: Vocalise
- Stereophonics – You Gotta Go There to Come Back
- Thighpaulsandra – Double Vulgar

== Theatre ==
- Theatr Genedlaethol Cymru established

== Film ==
=== English-language films ===
- Michael Sheen stars in Underworld.

=== Welsh-language films ===
- Y Mabinogi

== Broadcasting ==
=== Welsh-language television ===
- Wawffactor is S4C's answer to Pop Idol.
- Côr Cymru – S4C's search for the best choir in Wales – is broadcast for the first time.

=== English-language television ===
- Michael Sheen and Paul Rhys star in the award-winning TV drama, The Deal
- The Story of Welsh presented by Huw Edwards
- Quest For Perfection, written and presented by Russell Davies on BBC Four
- Jamie Baulch finishes third in the BBC's Superstars programme.

== Sport ==
- BBC Wales Sports Personality of the Year – Nicole Cooke
- Cricket
  - 31 December – Tony Lewis is appointed a CBE in the New Year Honours List.
- Cycling
  - Nicole Cooke wins La Flèche Wallonne Féminine for the first time.
- Football
  - Cardiff City F.C. win promotion to the Football League Championship.
- Rugby union
  - Introduction of regional rugby union teams in Wales – Professional teams launched as follows:
    - 1 April – Newport Gwent Dragons (merger of Ebbw Vale and Newport RFCs).
    - 6 June – Cardiff Blues.
    - 7 July – Llanelli Scarlets.
    - 24 July – Neath–Swansea Ospreys.
    - Summer – Celtic Warriors (merger of Bridgend and Pontypridd RFCs).
  - October – The Wales team participate in the Rugby World Cup in Australia. In the group stages Wales defeat Canada 41–10, Tonga 27–20, and Italy 41–10, but lose to New Zealand 37–53 to qualify for the knockout stages. The team lose to England 17–28 in the quarter-finals.
- Snooker
  - 9 February – Mark Williams wins his second Masters title.
  - 5 May – Mark Williams wins the World Snooker Championship for the second time.
  - 30 November – Matthew Stevens beats Stephen Hendry 10–8 to lift the 2003 UK Championship title.

== Deaths ==
- 5 January – Roy Jenkins, politician and Chancellor of Oxford University, 82
- 6 January – Glyn Davies, economist, 83
- 17 January – Goronwy Daniel, academic and civil servant, 88
- 26 January – Kingsley Jones, rugby union prop, 67
- 3 February – Trevor Morris, football player and manager, 82
- 26 February – Brian Evans, footballer, 60
- 14 April – Bob Evans, rugby player, 82
- 13 May – John Savage, prime minister of Nova Scotia 1993–97, 70
- 29 May – Trevor Ford, footballer, 79
- 8 June – Leighton Rees, darts player, 63
- 10 June – Phil Williams, politician, 64
- 16 June – Ivor Bennett, rugby player, 90
- 17 July – Dr David Kelly, government weapons expert, presumed suicide, 59
- 3 August – Norah Isaac, educationalist
- 5 August – Benjamin Noel Young Vaughan, Bishop of Swansea and Brecon, 85
- 20 September – Gareth Williams, Baron Williams of Mostyn, politician, 62
- 25 September
  - Dai Davies, Wales and British Lions international rugby union player, 78
  - David Williams, crime novelist, 77
- 29 September – Billy Cleaver, Wales international rugby union player and colliery manager, 82
- 7 October – Henry Herbert, 17th Earl of Pembroke, 64
- 13 October – Anne Ziegler, English soprano who retired to North Wales, 93
- 23 November – Paul Grant, bodybuilding champion, 60
- 27 November – Dai Francis, singer, 73
- 1 December – Hugh Rees, politician, 75
- 19 December – Roy Hughes, Baron Islwyn, politician, 78

== See also ==
- 2003 in Northern Ireland
