= 1993 in Scotland =

- Centuries: 18th; 19th; 20th; 21st
- Decades: 1970s; 1980s; 1990s; 2000s; 2010s
- See also: List of years in Scotland; Timeline of Scottish history 1993 in: The UK • England • Wales • Elsewhere; Scottish football: 1992–93 • 1993–94; 1993 in Scottish television

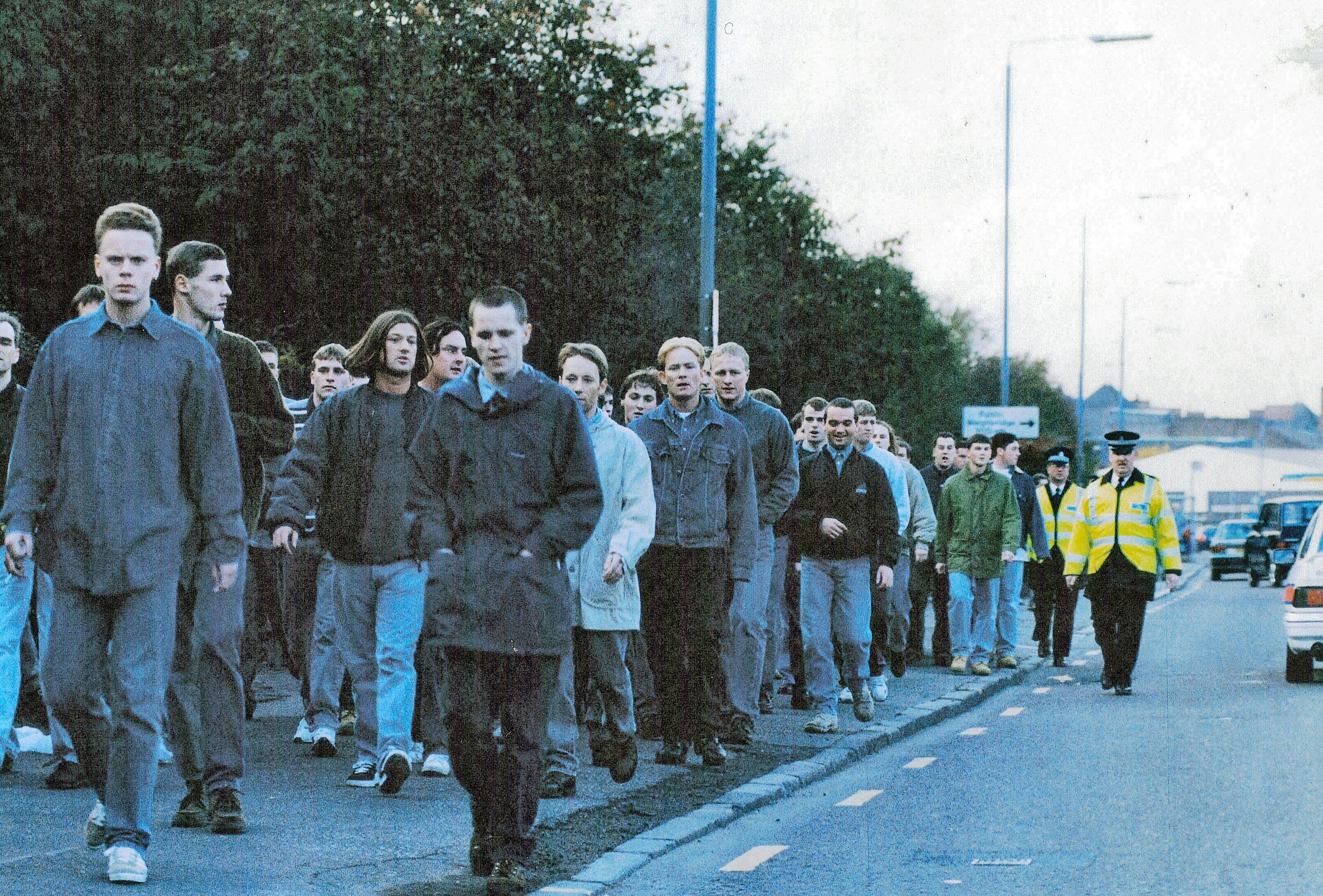
Going to a football match in Scotland in 1993.

Events from the year 1993 in Scotland.

== Incumbents ==
- Secretary of State for Scotland and Keeper of the Great Seal – Ian Lang

=== Law officers ===
- Lord Advocate – Lord Rodger of Earlsferry
- Solicitor General for Scotland – Thomas Dawson

=== Judiciary ===
- Lord President of the Court of Session and Lord Justice General – Lord Hope
- Lord Justice Clerk – Lord Ross
- Chairman of the Scottish Land Court – Lord Philip

== Events ==
- 5 January – oil tanker MV Braer runs aground on South Mainland of Shetland, spilling 84,700 tonnes of crude oil into the sea. She is broken up by the following Braer Storm of January 1993.
- 1 April
  - The Council Tax replaces the Community Charge as a means of raising revenue for local government.
  - Glasgow Caledonian University is created by merger of Glasgow Polytechnic and The Queen's College, Glasgow.
- 8 May – a new Methodist church building in Haroldswick, Shetland is dedicated, the most northerly church in the British Isles.
- 27 May – the Protection of Animals (Scotland) Act 1993, which increases the penalties for cruelty to animals, receives royal assent.
- 29 May – Rangers F.C. beat Aberdeen 2–1 to win the Scottish Cup.
- 9 June – Hulk of barque Glenlee returns to the Clyde (where she was built in 1896) from Spain under tow for restoration as a museum ship.
- July – Jim McLean steps down as manager of Dundee United after a reign of 21 years and seven months.
- 15 July – Rangers sign Duncan Ferguson for £4 million from Dundee United, a record fee between two British clubs.
- 13 September – Andy Roxburgh resigns after seven years as manager of the Scotland national football team, who now have virtually no hope of qualifying for next summer's World Cup.
- 1 November – Craig Brown appointed manager of the Scotland national football team.

== Births ==
- 26 January – Lana Clelland, footballer
- 9 May – Laura Muir, middle-distance runner
- 14 June – Graeme MacGregor, footballer
- 15 August – Vicky Wright, curler
- 4 September – Emma Brownlie, footballer
- 21 September – Kirsty Gilmour, badminton player
- 27 September – Sarah Robertson, field hockey player

== Deaths ==
- 18 January – Arthur Donaldson, former Scottish National Party leader (born 1901)
- 21 July – John Crichton-Stuart, 6th Marquess of Bute, architectural conservationist (born 1933 in London)
- 11 October – Andy Stewart, singer (born 1933)
- 24 October – Jo Grimond, former Liberal Party leader (born 1913)

== The arts ==
- April – St Mungo Museum of Religious Life and Art opens in Glasgow.
- 30 August – Irvine Welsh's novel Trainspotting is released at the Edinburgh International Book Festival.
- December – English writer Jo Rowling moves to Edinburgh where she works on her first Harry Potter novel.
- Royal Scottish Academy of Music and Drama in Glasgow becomes the first conservatoire in the United Kingdom to be granted its own degree-awarding powers.
- Peter Howson is appointed British official war artist in the Bosnian War.

== See also ==
- 1993 in Northern Ireland
- 1993 in Wales
