= 1999 in Wales =

- Centuries: 18th; 19th; 20th; 21st
- Decades: 1970s; 1980s; 1990s; 2000s; 2010s
- See also: List of years in Wales; Timeline of Welsh history 1999 in The United Kingdom England Scotland Elsewhere

This article is about the particular significance of the year 1999 to Wales and its people.

== Incumbents ==
- First Secretary – Alun Michael (from 12 May)
- Secretary of State for Wales
  - Alun Michael (until 28 July)
  - Paul Murphy
- Archbishop of Wales
  - Alwyn Rice Jones, Bishop of St Asaph (retired)
  - Rowan Williams, Bishop of Monmouth (elected)
- Archdruid of the National Eisteddfod of Wales
  - Dafydd Rowlands (outgoing)
  - Meirion Evans (incoming)

== Events ==
- January
  - Protesting farmers blockade the north Wales headquarters of supermarket chain Iceland.
  - Opening of the St David's Hotel in Cardiff Bay, Wales's first 5-star hotel.
- February – An outbreak of meningitis occurs in the Pontypridd area.
- March – West Wales and the Valleys is designated an Objective 1 region within the European Community.
- 6 May – 1999 National Assembly for Wales election, the first to be held.
- 10 May – The Queen attends a gala concert in Cardiff Bay to celebrate the opening of the Welsh Assembly.
- 12 May – The National Assembly for Wales meets in Cardiff for its first session.
- 19 May – 'Robbie', probably the last pit pony to work in the U.K. is retired at Pant y Gasseg drift mine, near Pontypool in the South Wales coalfield.
- June – Eight children in north Wales are taken ill with E. coli poisoning.
- 27 June – The Clydach murders: four members of the same family are found bludgeoned to death.
- July – Bryncelyn Brewery begins brewing.
- December – Hyder cuts 1000 jobs after being forced to make cuts in their charges for electricity and water.
- 19 December – Charlotte Church makes her debut as a television actress in Heartbeat.
- Main construction work on Cardiff Bay Barrage completed.

== Arts and literature ==
- Cysgod y Cryman by Islwyn Ffowc Elis (1953) is voted the most significant Welsh language book of the 20th century.
- Sir Harry Secombe suffers a second stroke, which forces him to give up his television career.
- Mary Hopkin joins The Chieftains on their UK tour.
- Dick Francis: A Racing Life, an unauthorised biography, suggests that his books were substantially written by his wife Mary.
- Painter Kyffin Williams is knighted for his services to the arts.
- September – Swansea Grand Theatre becomes the base for the Ballet Russe company.

=== Awards ===
- Cardiff Singer of the World – Anja Harteros
- Glyndŵr Award – Gillian Clarke
- National Eisteddfod of Wales: Chair – Gwenallt Lloyd Ifan
- National Eisteddfod of Wales: Crown – Ifor ap Glyn
- National Eisteddfod of Wales: Prose Medal – Sonia Edwards
- Wales Book of the Year:
  - English language: Emyr Humphreys – The Gift of a Daughter
  - Welsh language: R. M. Jones – Ysbryd y Cwlwm: Delwedd y Genedl yn ein Llenyddiaeth
- Gwobr Goffa Daniel Owen – Ann Pierce Jones – Fflamio

=== New books ===
==== English language ====
- Richard Booth – My Kingdom of Books
- John Davies – The Making of Wales
- Paul Ferris – Infidelity
- Patrick Hannan – The Welsh Illusion
- Craig Thomas – Slipping into Shadow

==== Welsh language ====
- Grahame Davies – Sefyll yn y Bwlch
- Mair Wynn Hughes – Hen Ŵr y Môr

=== New drama ===
- Greg Cullen – Paul Robeson Knew My Father (play)

=== Music ===
- Gillian Elisa – Haul ar Nos Hir (album)
- Gorky's Zygotic Mynci – Spanish Dance Troupe (album)
- Karl Jenkins – The Armed Man: a Mass for Peace

== Film ==
- Catherine Zeta-Jones co-stars in Entrapment.

=== Welsh-language films ===
- Cymer Dy Siâr
- Solomon a Gaenor, starring Ioan Gruffudd

=== Welsh-language television ===
- Y Palmant Aur (drama)
- Yno o hyd (documentary)
- Tri Tenor – Gala concert with performances by Welsh tenors Gwyn Hughes Jones, Rhys Meirion and Timothy Richards
- Catrin Finch (documentary)
- Ponteifi (sitcom)

=== English-language television ===
- Sea of Troubles (documentary)
- House of the Future (documentary by Malcolm Parry)
- Belonging (BBC Wales)
- The Big Picture (presented by Peter Lord)

== Sport ==
- BBC Wales Sports Personality of the Year – Colin Jackson
- Football
  - UWIC Inter Cardiff are Welsh Cup winners after beating Carmarthen Town on penalties.
  - Barry Town win their fourth successive League of Wales title.
  - Winners of the three divisions in the Welsh Football League are: Ton Pentre (Division 1), Penrhiwceiber Rangers (Division 2) & Caerleon (Division 3).
  - Flexsys Cefn Druids are champions of the Cymru Alliance.
  - AFC Llwydcoed and Garden Village are promoted to the Welsh Football League.
- Rugby
  - The Rugby World Cup is hosted by Wales, with the final being held at the Millennium Stadium in Cardiff, on 6 November. The winning team is Australia.
- Snooker
  - Mark Williams wins the Welsh Open tournament in Cardiff.
  - Mark Williams wins the UK Championship for the first time, defeating Matthew Stevens in an all-Welsh final.

== Births ==
- 12 January – Tyler Roberts, footballer
- 26 April – Jake Heyward, athlete
- 29 April – Callum Scott Howells, actor and singer
- 23 June – Cai Evans, rugby player
- 15 October – Ben Woodburn, footballer

== Deaths ==
- 3 February (in London) – Alfred Janes, artist, 87
- 8 February – Meredith Edwards, actor, 81
- 16 February – Don Hayward, Wales and British Lions international rugby player, 73
- 17 February – John Lansdown, computer graphics pioneer, 70
- 4 April – Raymond Davies Hughes, RAF airman and broadcaster, 75
- 11 April – Alan Evans, darts player, 49
- 6 May – Johnny Morris, television presenter, 82
- 11 May – Robert Thomas, sculptor, 72
- 12 July – Guy Griffiths, pilot, 84
- 16 July – Barri Jones, classical scholar and archaeologist, 63
- 5 September – Ivor Roberts, former TWW presenter, 74
- 22 September – Clive Jenkins, trade union leader, 73
- 24 October – Howard Griffiths, screenwriter, 64
- 15 November – Sir Harry Llewellyn, equestrian champion, 88
- 27 November – Ernest Zobole, artist, 72
- 6 December – Gwyn Jones, writer, 92
- 19 December – Desmond Llewelyn, actor, 85 (car accident)
- 23 December – Eirene White, politician, 90

== See also ==
- 1999 in Northern Ireland
