= 2003 in Scotland =

- Centuries: 19th; 20th; 21st
- Decades: 1980s; 1990s; 2000s; 2010s; 2020s
- See also: List of years in Scotland; Timeline of Scottish history 2003 in: The UK • England • Wales • Elsewhere; Scottish football: 2002–03 • 2003–04; 2003 in Scottish television

Events from the year 2003 in Scotland.

== Incumbents ==
- First Minister and Keeper of the Great Seal – Jack McConnell
- Secretary of State for Scotland – Helen Liddell until 13 June; then Alistair Darling

=== Law officers ===
- Lord Advocate – Lord Boyd of Duncansby
- Solicitor General for Scotland – Elish Angiolini
- Advocate General for Scotland – Lynda Clark

=== Judiciary ===
- Lord President of the Court of Session and Lord Justice General – Lord Cullen of Whitekirk
- Lord Justice Clerk – Lord Gill
- Chairman of the Scottish Land Court – Lord McGhie

== Events ==
- 29 January – Nat Fraser is found guilty of murdering his wife, Arlene, who went missing almost five years earlier, and is sentenced to life imprisonment with a recommendation to serve a minimum of 25 years behind bars.
- 15 February – Up to 100,000 people march in Glasgow to protest against the looming Iraq War.
- 25 February – The Land Reform (Scotland) Act 2003 receives royal assent.
- 3 May – 2003 Scottish Parliament election: the Labour and Liberal Democrat coalition led by First Minister Jack McConnell win a majority of seats and are re-elected. The Scottish Green Party and the Scottish Socialist Party significantly increase their representation and the Scottish Senior Citizens Unity Party gains one seat.
- 9 August – Temperatures at Greycrook in the Scottish Borders reach 32.9 °C, the highest recorded in Scotland until 2022.
- 25 August – Glasgow Zoo closes.
- 1 September – Cairngorms National Park created, Scotland's second national park.
- 21 October – Keith O'Brien is proclaimed a Cardinal by Pope John Paul II.
- 24 November – The high court in Glasgow imposes a minimum sentence of 27 years for Al Ali Mohmed Al Megrahi, the Libyan national convicted of bombing Pan Am Flight 103 over Lockerbie in 1988.
- Ownership of the Barra Estate is passed by the owner, Ian MacNeil, to the Scottish Government.

== Births ==
- 10 February - Jack Milne, professional footballer

== Deaths ==
- 26 January – George Younger, Conservative politician, former Secretary of State for Scotland (born 1931)
- 14 February – Dolly, cloned sheep (born 1996)
- 30 July – Steve Hislop, motorcycle racer, killed in helicopter accident (born 1962)
- 25 September – Alastair Borthwick, broadcaster and mountaineer (born 1913)

== The arts ==
- 7 April – James Robertson's historical novel Joseph Knight is published.
- 27 August – Leonardo da Vinci's Madonna of the Yarnwinder is stolen from the Duke of Buccleuch collection at Drumlanrig Castle in Dumfriesshire. It is recovered in 2007.
- 22 November – Two Lochs Radio begins broadcasting.
- Lin Anderson's first "Tartan Noir" novel Driftnet is published.
- Anne Donovan's first full-length novel Buddha Da is published.
- The folk band Harem Scarem is formed.
- Scottish hip hop duo Silibil N' Brains begin performing in the guise of California rappers (in London).

== See also ==
- 2003 in England
- 2003 in Northern Ireland
- 2003 in Wales
