= 1995 in Scotland =

- Centuries: 18th; 19th; 20th; 21st
- Decades: 1970s; 1980s; 1990s; 2000s; 2010s
- See also: List of years in Scotland; Timeline of Scottish history 1995 in: The UK • England • Wales • Elsewhere; Scottish football: 1994–95 • 1995–96; 1995 in Scottish television

Events from the year 1995 in Scotland.

== Incumbents ==
- Secretary of State for Scotland and Keeper of the Great Seal – Ian Lang until 5 July; then Michael Forsyth

=== Law officers ===
- Lord Advocate – Lord Rodger of Earlsferry; then Donald Mackay
- Solicitor General for Scotland – Thomas Dawson; then Donald Mackay; then Paul Cullen

=== Judiciary ===
- Lord President of the Court of Session and Lord Justice General – Lord Hope
- Lord Justice Clerk – Lord Ross
- Chairman of the Scottish Land Court – Lord Philip

== Events ==
- Early – The Deep-fried Mars bar originates at Haven Chip Bar in Stonehaven.
- 6 April – 1995 Scottish local elections are held for the 29 new mainland unitary authorities that will replace the Regional and District Councils next year.
- 7 April – Rob Roy, starring Liam Neeson as Robert Roy MacGregor, is released.
- 18 April – Caledonian MacBrayne Ullapool-Stornoway ferry MV Isle of Lewis is launched at Ferguson Shipbuilders' Port Glasgow yard.
- 24 May – Braveheart, directed by and starring Mel Gibson as William Wallace, is released; it goes on to win five Academy Awards at the 68th Academy Awards.
- 25 May – Perth and Kinross by-election: Roseanna Cunningham wins for the Scottish National Party with a swing of 11.6%.
- 16 June – FirstBus is formed by merger of Badgerline with GRT Group of Aberdeen.
- 17 June - Pride March The first Pride march in Scotland gathers on Barony Street in Edinburgh on 17 June.
- 19 July – The Children (Scotland) Act 1995, which seeks to put into legislation the provisions of the United Nations Convention on the Rights of the Child, receives royal assent.
- 17 August – Arran distillery opens.
- 11 October – Duncan Ferguson, the 23-year-old Everton F.C. striker, receives a three-month prison sentence for assaulting an opponent while playing for Rangers F.C. eighteen months earlier. Ferguson is the first British footballer to be jailed for an on-field offence.
- 12 October – Boxer James Murray suffers serious head injuries in a fight at a Glasgow hotel, leading to a declaration of brain death on 15 October, sparking calls for boxing to be banned.
- 16 October – Skye bridge opened.
- November – The first onshore wind farm in Scotland, Hagshaw Hill in South Lanarkshire, is commissioned.
- 8 November – Criminal Procedure (Scotland) Act 1995 passed.
- 24 November – Duncan Ferguson is released from prison after serving half of his three-month sentence.
- 30 November – Scottish Constitutional Convention publishes its blueprint for devolution, Scotland's Parliament, Scotland's Right.
- 30 December – Altnaharra matches the lowest temperature UK Weather Record at −27.2 °C.

== The arts ==
- Dunedin Consort formed.
- Andrew O'Hagan's first novel, The Missing, is published.
- Alan Warner's first novel, Morvern Callar is published; it is a winner of the Somerset Maugham Award in 1996.

== Births ==
- 21 January
  - Chloe Arthur, footballer
  - David McNeil, footballer
- 22 February – Ryan Christie, footballer
- 31 March – Fiona Brown, footballer
- 11 April – Thomas Muirhead, curler
- 21 April – Thomas Doherty, actor and singer
- 20 June – Caroline Weir, footballer
- 14 July – Megan Cunningham, footballer
- 6 October – Ross Muir, snooker player
- 1 December – Jenna Fife, footballer
- 11 December – Abbi Grant, footballer
- 19 December – Lewis Vaughan, footballer

== Deaths ==
- 14 January – Alexander Gibson, conductor and opera intendant (born 1926)
- February – Robert Stewart, textile designer (born 1924)
- 19 February – Nicholas Fairbairn, lawyer and Conservative politician (born 1933)
- 19 April – Neil Paterson, writer and footballer (born 1915)
- 9 October – Alec Douglas-Home, Lord Home of the Hirsel, Conservative Prime Minister of the United Kingdom (born 1903)
- 15 October – James Murray, boxer (born 1969)
- 24 October – Ronnie Selby Wright, Church of Scotland minister (born 1908)

== See also ==
- 1995 in Northern Ireland
