= 1995 in England =

- Centuries: 18th; 19th; 20th; 21st
- Decades: 1970s; 1980s; 1990s; 2000s; 2010s
- See also: 1994–95 in English football 1995–96 in English football 1995 in the United Kingdom; Other events of 1995

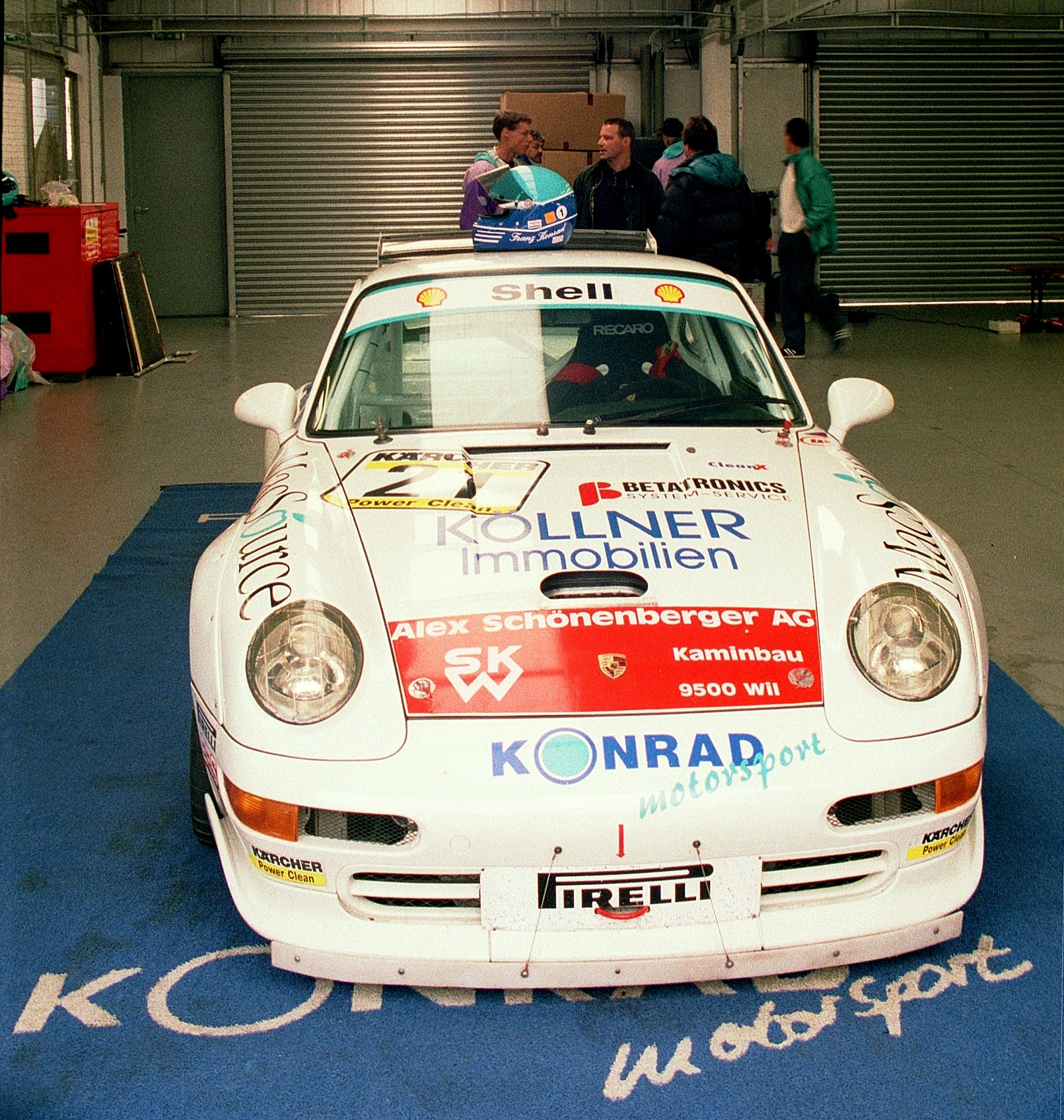
Porsche 911 GT – Franz Konrad, Toni Seiler & Andre Lara-Resende in the pits at the Norwich Union Empire Trophy, Silverstone 4 Hours 1995

Events from 1995 in England

== Incumbent ==
- Monarch – Elizabeth II
- Prime Minister – John Major

== Events ==
=== January ===
- 1 January – Fred West is found hanged in his cell at Winson Green Prison in Birmingham. The 53-year-old had been on remand since February last year, having allegedly murdered 12 people whose bodies were found at three locations in and around Gloucester. The crimes are believed to have been committed between 1967 and 1987.
- 10 January – Andy Cole, 23-year-old Newcastle United striker, becomes the country's most expensive footballer in a £7,000,000 valued deal when he joins Manchester United; £6,000,000 cash is paid for the player, with £1,000,000 valued winger Keith Gillespie joining Newcastle United as part of the deal.
- 25 January – Manchester United footballer, Eric Cantona, launches a kung-fu style kick on Crystal Palace supporter Matthew Simmons after being sent off in a game at Selhurst Park.
- 27 January – Manchester United fine Eric Cantona £20,000 and suspend him until the end of the season for his kung-fu attack on a Crystal Palace supporter.

=== February ===
- 1 February – Animal rights campaigner Jill Phipps, 31, dies after being hit by a lorry during protesting at Coventry Airport.
- 15 February – The England national football team's friendly against Republic of Ireland is cancelled due to rioting. The score (1–0 to the Republic, with a goal from David Kelly) is ordered to stand. Further scuffles break out on ferries crossing the Irish Sea after the game.
- 21 February
  - George Graham, who has been manager of Arsenal since May 1986 and won six major trophies for them during that time, is dismissed after admitting that he accepted a £425,000 bribe from an agent who handled the transfer of Danish midfielder John Jensen to the club in July 1992.
  - Eric Cantona is charged with common assault.

=== March ===
- 1 March – Formula One racing driver Damon Hill is banned from driving for seven days after admitting that he drove at 165 mph on the M40 motorway. He is also fined £350 and ordered to pay £25 in costs.
- 4 March – Andy Cole becomes the first player to score five goals in a Premier League when Manchester United beat the division's bottom placed club Ipswich Town 9–0 at Old Trafford.
- 14 March – Southampton FC's former Liverpool F.C. goalkeeper Bruce Grobbelaar, Wimbledon FC's Hans Segers and his former teammate John Fashanu (now of Aston Villa FC), are arrested on suspicion of match fixing.
- 15 March – Ronnie Kray, one of the Kray Twins, is taken to hospital after suffering a heart attack at Broadmoor secure hospital in Berkshire. He was sentenced to life imprisonment in 1969 for a series of gangland crimes including the murder of George Cornell.
- 17 March – Ronnie Kray dies in hospital aged 61.1995: Killer Ronnie Kray dies
- 23 March – Eric Cantona is found guilty of common assault at Croydon Crown Court. The trial judge sentences him to 14 days in prison, but grants him bail pending an appeal against the sentence. The Football Association has since extended his ban from football until 30 September this year and fined him a further £20,000.
- 31 March – Eric Cantona's prison sentence is quashed on appeal and replaced with a 120-hour community service order.

=== April ===
- 9 April – Paul Nixon, 35-year-old Crystal Palace supporter, is crushed to death by a coach during a pub brawl between Manchester United and Crystal Palace fans in Walsall just before the FA Cup semi-final between the two clubs at nearby Villa Park. The game ends in a 2–2 draw.
- 13 April – Manchester United beat Crystal Palace 2–0 in the FA Cup semi-final replay at Villa Park, which is attended by just over 18,000 people.

=== May ===
- 13 May – mountain climber Alison Hargreaves becomes the first woman to ascend Mount Everest without oxygen or sherpas.
- 14 May – Blackburn Rovers become Premier League champions, making them champions of the English league for the first time since 1914. It is also their first major trophy since 1928. Their manager Kenny Dalglish, who won the old Football League First Division title three times with Liverpool, becomes only the third manager to win English top division league titles with different clubs.
- 20 May – Everton lift the FA Cup with a 1–0 win over Manchester United at Wembley Stadium, with Paul Rideout scoring the only goal of the game to give Everton their first major trophy since they were league champions in 1987, and condemn Manchester United to their first trophyless season since 1989.

=== June ===
- 10 June – White and Asian youths riot in Bradford, West Yorkshire.
- 14 June – Pauline Clare is appointed as the first female Chief Constable, with Lancashire Constabulary.
- 25 June – Lawrence Bierton and Michael Pluck murder a pair of elderly sisters in Rotherham.
- 28 June – Dennis Bergkamp, 26-year-old Dutch striker, becomes Britain's most expensive footballer when he joins Arsenal in a £7,500,000 move from Inter Milan of Italy.

=== July ===
- 1 July – Just 48 hours after Dennis Bergkamp's transfer, 24-year-old Stan Collymore becomes the third player this year to set the British football transfer record when he joins Liverpool from Nottingham Forest for £8,500,000.

=== August ===
- 11 August – An inquest records a verdict of accidental death on Jill Phipps, the animal rights campaigner who was knocked down and killed by a lorry during protests at Coventry Airport.

=== September ===
- 2 September – Boxer Frank Bruno wins the WBC world heavyweight championship.

=== October ===
- 1 October – Eric Cantona returns from his suspension after eight months and scores a late equaliser for Manchester United in their Premier League fixture against Liverpool.
- 3 October – Rosemary West goes on trial at Winchester Crown Court charged with 10 of the 12 murders that were allegedly committed by her late husband Fred. Mrs West denies the charges and argues that all of the murders – not just the two committed before Rose and Fred's marriage in 1970 – were committed by Fred alone.
- 28 October – at Wembley Stadium the England national rugby league team loses the 1995 World Cup final to Australia

=== November ===
- 14 November – Graham Taylor, the former England national football team manager, resigns as manager of Division One team Wolverhampton Wanderers after 20 months in charge.
- 16 November – Essex student Leah Betts, 18, dies in hospital three days after taking ecstasy at her home in Latchingdon.
- 22 November – Rosemary West is sentenced to life imprisonment for her part in ten murders committed in conjunction with her late husband Fred between 1970 and 1987. The trial judge at Winchester Crown Court recommends that 42-year-old West should never be released from prison. She is to be imprisoned at Durham Prison, to which the notorious Moors Murderer Myra Hindley was transferred earlier this year.

=== December ===
- 8 December
  - Headteacher Philip Lawrence is stabbed to death outside his school, St George's Roman Catholic Secondary School in West London.
  - Three drug dealers, part of the notorious "Essex Boys" gang, are found shot dead in the back of a Range Rover on an isolated country road.
- 13 December – Rioting breaks out in Brixton following the death of Wayne Douglas, a 26-year-old black man, in police custody. The chaos lasts for five hours and ends with 22 arrests.
- 21 December – Jack Charlton retires after nearly 10 years as manager of the Republic of Ireland football team, during which time he helped them reach the World Cup quarter-finals in 1990 and the second round in 1994.

== Births ==
- 20 January – Calum Chambers
- 2 February – Tom Blyth, actor
- 2 February – Callum Robinson, Footballer
- 3 February – Aimee Lou Wood, actress
- 7 February – Tom Glynn-Carney, actor
- 10 February – Archie Madekwe, actor
- 13 February – Alex Mowatt, footballer
- 24 February – Jacob Murphy, footballer
- 30 March – Simone Ashley, actress
- 30 March – Tao Geoghegan Hart, road cyclist
- 17 April – Phoebe Dynevor, actress
- 4 May – Alex Lawther, actor
- 9 May – Beth Mead, footballer
- 20 June – Behzinga, YouTuber
- 9 July – Georgie Henley, actress
- 12 July – Luke Shaw, footballer
- 2 August – Vikkstar123, YouTuber
- 17 August – Alex Skeel, football coach and domestic violence survivor
- 22 August – Dua Lipa, English and Albanian singer
- 2 December – Kalvin Phillips, footballer
- 4 December – Dina Asher-Smith, sprinter
- 13 December – Emma Corrin, actor
- 21 December – Kelly Smith, rugby union player

== Deaths ==
- 22 February – Marie-Noële Kelly, traveler and hostess.
- 17 May – Geoffrey Dickens, Member of Parliament for Huddersfield West and Littleborough and Saddleworth

== See also ==
- 1995 in Northern Ireland
- 1995 in Scotland
- 1995 in Wales
