= 2001 in England =

- Centuries: 19th; 20th; 21st
- Decades: 1980s; 1990s; 2000s; 2010s; 2020s
- See also: 2000–01 in English football 2001–02 in English football 2001 in the United Kingdom; Other events of 2001

This list contains events from 2001 in England.

== Incumbent ==
- Monarch - Elizabeth II
- Prime Minister - Tony Blair

== Events ==
=== January ===
- 5 January – A report by the Department of Health suggests that Dr Harold Shipman may have killed more than 300 patients since the 1970s.
- 8 January – The High Court rules that the identities and whereabouts of the two killers of James Bulger are to be kept secret for the rest of their lives. Robert Thompson and Jon Venables, both now aged 19, are expected to be released from custody later this year.
- 9 January – Sven-Göran Eriksson begins his job as manager of the England football team six months ahead of schedule, having resigned from his previous job as Lazio manager. He had signed a five-year contract with the Football Association on 30 October 2000 to succeed Kevin Keegan.
- 12 January – Marie Therese Kouao and Carl Manning are sentenced to life imprisonment for the murder of their niece Victoria Climbie, who died last year after suffering horrific abuse and neglect at the hands of the couple in their London home. Victoria (aged eight) had been living with the pair since her parents sent her to England in order to receive a good education.
- 16 January – Mitchell Quy is convicted of the murder of his wife Lynsey Quy in Southport, Lancashire and sentenced to life imprisonment.

=== February ===
- 24–27 February – Patient Tony Collins spends 77 1/2 hours on a hospital trolley outside the toilets in the Princess Margaret Hospital, Swindon.
- 25 February – Liverpool defeated Birmingham City on penalties after a 1–1 draw in the Football League Cup final – the first cup final to be played at Millennium Stadium, Cardiff, since Wembley closed for redevelopment.
- 28 February – A rail crash near Selby kills 10 people.

=== March ===
- 8 March – The wreckage of Donald Campbell's speedboat Bluebird K7 is raised from the bottom of Coniston Water in Cumbria, 34 years after Campbell was killed in an attempt to break the world water speed record.
- 15 March – Donald Campbell's body is recovered from Lake Coniston, 34 years after he died in an attempt to break the land water speed record.
- 17 March – The Eden Project opens to the public near St Austell, Cornwall; conceived by Tim Smit with design by Nicholas Grimshaw & Partners.
- 18 March – Claire Marsh (aged 18) becomes the youngest woman in Britain to be convicted of rape after pinning down a woman who was raped by a pair of teenagers in west London. She is sentenced to seven years in prison, while her accomplices (aged 15 and 18) are jailed for five years.
- 31 March – Stuart Lubbock is found dead at the Home of Michael Barrymore.

=== April ===
- 5 April – Perry Wacker, a Dutch lorry driver, is jailed for 14 years for the manslaughter of 58 Chinese illegal immigrants who were found suffocated in his lorry at Dover ferry port in June last year.
- 15 April – Manchester United win the FA Premier League title for the third season in succession, and the seventh time in nine seasons.
- 23 April
  - Jane Andrews, a former personal assistant to Sarah, Duchess of York, goes on trial accused of murdering her fiancé Thomas Cressman.
  - Manchester United pay a British record fee of £19million for Ruud van Nistelrooy, the 24-year-old PSV Eindhoven and Netherlands national football team striker who had been due to join the club last year until the transfer was put on hold by injury.

=== May ===
- 1 May – An anti-capitalist demonstration in London, part of worldwide protests, turns violent.
- 12 May – Liverpool win the FA Cup Final when two Michael Owen goals in the final minutes of the game give them a 2–1 win over Arsenal in the final at the Millennium Stadium.
- 16 May –
  - Deputy Prime Minister John Prescott punches a protester who threw an egg at him in Rhyl.
  - Jane Andrews is sentenced to life imprisonment after being found guilty of murdering Thomas Cressman.
  - Liverpool win the UEFA Cup – their first European trophy for 17 years – with a 5–4 win over Spanish side Deportivo Alavés.
- 24 May – At Bristol Crown Court, Lee Ford is sentenced to five terms of life imprisonment after pleading guilty to the murders of his wife and four stepchildren at their home in Carnkie, near Redruth, Cornwall, in September 2000.

=== June ===
- 8 June – William Hague announces his resignation as Conservative Party leader after four years.
- 22 June – Home Secretary David Blunkett announces that Robert Thompson and Jon Venables, convicted at the age of 11 of murdering toddler James Bulger on Merseyside, are to be released on life licence later this year after the Parole Board recommended their release after eight years in custody.
- 25 June – A race riot breaks out in Burnley, with more than 200 white and Asian youths being involved in brawling, vandalism and arson.
- 29 June – The government announces plans to build a £3million fountain in memory of Diana, Princess of Wales at Hyde Park, London.

=== July ===
- 2 July – Barry George is sentenced to life imprisonment for the murder of the television presenter Jill Dando, who was killed in Fulham, London, on 26 April 1999.
- 7 July – Two people are stabbed in race riots in Bradford, West Yorkshire.
- 12 July – The British transfer record in broken for the third time in eight months when Manchester United pay Italian club Lazio £28.1million for Argentine midfielder Juan Sebastián Verón.
- 16 July – The Labour government suffers its first parliamentary defeat over the sacking of Gwyneth Dunwoody and Donald Anderson as chairs of select committees on transport and foreign affairs.
- 19 July – Politician and novelist Jeffrey Archer is sentenced to four years in prison for perjury and perverting the course of justice.
- 20 July – Rioting breaks out in Brixton, London, following the fatal shooting Derek Bennett, a 29-year-old black man, by armed police in the area. 27 people are arrested and three police officers are injured.
- 29 July – A victim support group condemns a reported £11,000 payout by the Criminal Injuries Compensation Authority to the parents of murdered Sarah Payne as "derisory".

=== August ===
- 7 August – The government takes an unprecedented step with the £27million nationalisation of a private hospital near Harley Street in London.
- 10 August – former Conservative Party MP Neil Hamilton and his wife Christine are arrested on suspicion of sexual assault.
- 16 August – Royal butler Paul Burrell charged with the theft of items belonging to Diana, Princess of Wales.
- 31 August – Neil and Christine Hamilton are cleared in connection with the sexual assault allegations.

=== September ===
- 5 September – Peter Bray completes the first crossing of the Atlantic Ocean in a kayak.
- 7 September – One million children in over 3,000 schools participate in an experiment to discover if it is possible to create earthquakes by all jumping off chairs.
- 10 September – The Bank of Scotland and the Halifax merge to form HBOS plc.
- 11 September – One Canada Square, the UK's tallest building, and the London Stock Exchange are evacuated following the terrorist attacks in the United States.
- 13 September – Iain Duncan Smith becomes leader of the Conservative Party after winning the leadership election.
- 14 September – National memorial service held at St Paul's Cathedral for the victims of the September 11 terrorist attacks.
- 17 September – Gateshead Millennium Bridge opens to the public.
- 21 September – Teenager Ross Parker murdered in racially motivated attack by Muslim Asian gang in Peterborough.

=== October ===
- 6 October – The England national football team achieves automatic qualification for next summer's World Cup in Japan and South Korea with a 2–2 draw against Greece at Old Trafford, thanks to an injury time equaliser by captain David Beckham.
- 23 October – Funeral of racially motivated murder victim Ross Parker takes place at Peterborough Crematorium with over 400 mourners attending.

=== November ===
- 9 November – Debut of the film Harry Potter and the Philosopher's Stone in London.
- 22 November – At the Ipswich by-election, the Labour Party candidate Chris Mole holds the seat.
- 24 November – The 2001 Kangaroo tour concludes with Australia defeating Great Britain in the 3rd and deciding test match of the Ashes series.

=== December ===
- 10 December
  - V. S. Naipaul wins the Nobel Prize in Literature "for having united perceptive narrative and incorruptible scrutiny in works that compel us to see the presence of suppressed histories".
  - Timothy Hunt and Paul Nurse win the Nobel Prize in Physiology or Medicine jointly with Leland H. Hartwell "for their discoveries of key regulators of the cell cycle".
- 12 December – Roy Whiting is found guilty at Lewes Crown Court of the murder of Sarah Payne, who was found dead near Pulborough, West Sussex, in July last year. It is then revealed that Whiting already had a conviction for abducting and molesting an eight-year-old girl in 1995. The trial judge sentences Whiting, a 42-year-old former mechanic, to life imprisonment and says that it is a rare case in which he would recommend to the appropriate authorities that life should mean life. It is only the 24th time that such a recommendation has been made in British legal history.
- 13 December – Lynette Lithgow, 51-year-old former BBC newsreader, is found murdered with her mother and brother at the family home in Trinidad.
- 21 December – The Metropolitan Police storm a cargo ship in the English Channel fearing that it may contain terrorist material.
- 22 December – English-born terrorist, Richard Reid, attempts to blow up American Airlines Flight 63 from Charles de Gaulle Airport in Paris to Miami International Airport, using explosives hidden in his shoes.

== Births ==
- Lauren Bell, cricketer
- 24 February Anthony Gordon, footballer
- 5 September Bukayo Saka, footballer

== See also ==
- 2001 in Northern Ireland
- 2001 in Scotland
- 2001 in Wales
