= 1999 in England =

- Centuries: 18th; 19th; 20th; 21st
- Decades: 1970s; 1980s; 1990s; 2000s; 2010s
- See also: 1998–99 in English football 1999–2000 in English football 1999 in the United Kingdom; Other events of 1999

Events from 1999 in England

== Incumbent ==
- Monarch - Elizabeth II
- Prime Minister - Tony Blair

== Events ==
=== January ===
- 22 January – Aston Villa, who have emerged as surprise FA Premier League title contenders this season, have their double hopes shattered by a shock 2–0 exit by the ambitious Division Two club Fulham.
- 28 January – Steve McManaman, captain of Liverpool Football Club, agrees to sign for Real Madrid of Spain at the end of this football season.
- 30 January – England national football team manager Glenn Hoddle gives an interview to The Times newspaper in which he suggests that people born with disabilities are paying for sins in a previous life.

=== February ===
- 2 February – The Football Association dismisses Glenn Hoddie as manager due to the controversy sparked by his comments about disabled people.
- 12 February – A 15-mile extension to the M1 motorway north of Leeds is opened by John Prescott.
- 17 February – Kevin Keegan accepts a contract to manage the England football team for their next four matches, but decides to continue with his job as Fulham manager for the time being.
- 22 February – Harold Shipman, the Hyde GP accused of murdering eight female patients last September, is charged with a further seven murders.
- 24 February – The report of the murder of black London teenager Stephen Lawrence, who was stabbed to death in 1993, condemns London's police force as "institutionally racist", as well as condemning its officers for "fundamental errors".

=== March ===
- 2 March – Singer Dusty Springfield, who received an OBE last month, dies aged 59 after a five-year battle against breast cancer.
- 11 March – Wembley Stadium is sold for £103million to a consortium backed by the Football Association. The stadium, which was opened in 1923, is set to be demolished by the end of next year and a new stadium opened in its place by August 2003.
- 20 March – Brian Jones and Swiss balloonist Bertrand Piccard complete the first non-stop hot air balloon circumnavigation of the world.
- 21 March - Comedian Ernie Wise, who formed one half of the Morecambe and Wise comedy double from 1941 to 1984, dies of a heart attack aged 73.
- 24 March – Ross Kemp, who has achieved TV stardom with his role as Grant Mitchell in EastEnders, signs a £1million deal with ITV, meaning that he will leave EastEnders this autumn after nearly 10 years.
- 26 March
  - Chelsea assistant manager Graham Rix, 41, is sentenced to a year in prison for having sex with a 15-year-old girl.
  - Paul Scholes, 24-year-old Manchester United midfielder, scores a hat-trick in a 3–1 Wembley win over Poland in Kevin Keegan's first game as England manager.
- 29 March – The family of James Hanratty, one of the last men to be executed in Britain for the A6 murder 37 years ago, are given the right to appeal against his murder conviction by the Criminal Cases Review Commission.

=== April ===
- 14 April – Edgar Pearce, the so-called "Mardi Gra bomber", convicted for a series of bombings and sentenced to 21 years in jail.
- 17 April – A bomb explodes in Brixton, South London, and injures 45 people.
- 21 April – After being two goals down, Manchester United beat Italian champions Juventus 3–2 in the European Cup semi-final in Turin to complete a 4–3 aggregate win and reach the European Cup final for the second time in their history. Their previous final appearance came in 1968 when they won the trophy.
- 24 April – A second bomb explosion in Brick Lane, east London injures 13 people.
- 26 April – TV presenter Jill Dando, 37, dies after being shot on the doorstep of her Fulham home.
- 28 April
  - Kevin Keegan reveals that he is prepared to become England manager on a permanent basis and quit his job as manager of Fulham (who are already promoted from Division Two as champions) at the end of this football season.
  - Sir Alf Ramsey, manager of England's 1966 World Cup winning team, dies of a stroke aged 79.
- 30 April – A third bomb in London explodes in the Admiral Duncan pub, in Old Compton Street, Soho, London — the centre of the London gay scene — killing two people (including a pregnant woman) and injuring over thirty. David Copeland, a 23-year-old Farnborough man, is arrested hours later in connection with the three explosions.

=== May ===
- 3 May – David Copeland appears in court charged with the recent bombings in London.
- 16 May – Manchester United win the Premier League title by beating Tottenham Hotspur 2–1 at Old Trafford on the last day of the league season. They have been league champions five times in seven seasons, and are also in the finals of the FA Cup and European Cup.
- 21 May – Jill Dando is buried in her hometown of Weston-super-Mare.
- 22 May – Manchester United win the FA Cup for a record 10th time with a 2–0 win over Newcastle United at Wembley.
- 24 May – England national rugby team captain Lawrence Dallaglio resigns after a tabloid newspaper accused him of having taken drugs.
- 26 May – Manchester United (who have already won the Premier League and FA Cup this season) complete a unique treble of major trophies when they defeat Bayern Munich of Germany 2–1 in the European Cup final at Nou Camp stadium in Barcelona, Spain.
- 31 May – The Princess Royal opens the new Midland Metro tram service in the West Midlands, which runs on a 15-mile route mostly consisted of disused railway lines between Birmingham and Wolverhampton.

=== June ===
- 8 June – former cabinet minister Jonathan Aitken is sentenced to 18 months prison for perjury.
- 10 June – At the Leeds Central by-election, Hilary Benn holds the seat for the Labour Party.
- 12 June – The Queen's Birthday Honours are announced. They include a knighthood for the Manchester United manager Alex Ferguson and the ITV newsreader Trevor McDonald.
- 16 June – David Sutch, the founder of the Official Monster Raving Loony Party, is found hanged at his home in Harrow. He was 58.
- 17 June – Cardinal Basil Hume, leader of the Roman Catholic Church in England and Wales, dies of cancer aged 76 barely two months after the illness was diagnosed.
- 18 June – Police clash with protesters at a demonstration against capitalism in London.
- 19 June – The wedding of Prince Edward and Sophie Rhys-Jones takes place at St George's Chapel, Windsor. Prior to the marriage, the Queen creates Prince Edward, her third and youngest son, Earl of Wessex and Viscount Severn.
- 22 June – Patrick Magee is released from prison under the Good Friday Agreement, 14 years into his life sentence for the Provisional Irish Republican Army bombing at the Grand Hotel in Brighton, which killed five people during the Conservative Party conference on 12 October 1984.
- 23 June
  - Fears about the future of the Rover Group's Longbridge plant in Birmingham are calmed by the news that owner BMW is to invest £2.5billion in the plant.
  - Construction of the Millennium Dome is finished.
- 30 June – Manchester United announce that they will not compete in the FA Cup in the forthcoming football season so they can concentrate on their participation in the 2000 FIFA Club World Championship in Brazil at the start of the next year. Their decision is seen as a major boost to England's hopes of hosting the 2006 World Cup.

=== July ===
- 1 July – William Whitelaw, Viscount of Penrith and former deputy prime minister under Margaret Thatcher, dies at the age of 81.
- 4 July – Rogue trader Nick Leeson returns home to England from Singapore, nearly four years after he was jailed there after his illegal dealings led to the collapse of Barings Bank with losses of £850million.
- 5 July – Chelsea pay a club record of £10million (one of the highest fees paid by any English club) for the Blackburn Rovers striker Chris Sutton.
- 22 July – At the Eddisbury by-election, Stephen O'Brien holds the seat for the Conservative Party.

=== August ===
- 11 August – The solar eclipse attracts the attention of 350million people across Europe, with Cornwall being the only region of Britain to experience totality.
- 22 August – Norfolk farmer Tony Martin, 54, is charged with the murder of a 16-year-old burglar who was shot dead at his home two days ago. He is also charged with wounding a 29-year-old man who was also present at the time of the burglary.
- 28 August – Ruud Gullit resigns after one year as manager of Newcastle United, during which they were beaten FA Cup finalists for the second year in succession.

=== September ===
- 5 September – Bobby Robson, the 66-year-old former England manager, is appointed as Newcastle United's new manager. He is nearly 30 years older than his predecessor Ruud Gullit.
- 9 September – Chris Patten's report recommends reform of Royal Ulster Constabulary.
- 23 September – At the Wigan by-election, Neil Turner holds the seat for the Labour Party.
- 24 September – The Bank of Scotland launches a hostile takeover bid for the NatWest Bank.
- 27 September – The Midland Bank adopts the name of its owner HSBC, marking an end of the Midland Bank name after 163 years.

=== October ===
- 5 October
  - The Ladbroke Grove rail crash claims the lives of 31 people when two trains collide at Ladbroke Grove Junction, 2 miles west of Paddington station, London. Many more people are being treated in hospital for injuries.
  - Harold Shipman goes on trial at Preston Crown Court accused of murdering 15 female patients who died in the Greater Manchester area between 1995 and 1998.
- 10 October – The London Eye begins to be lifted into position on the South Bank in London.
- 16 October – 26 players are sent off in Premier League and Football League matches on the same day – the most dismissals on the same day in 111 years of league football in England.
- 19 October – Tracey Emin exhibits My Bed at the Tate Gallery as one of the shortlisted works for the Turner Prize.

=== November ===
- 12 November – Rock singer Gary Glitter, 54, is jailed for four months at Bristol Crown Court for downloading child pornography. He is, however, cleared of having unlawful sex with a teenage fan 20 years ago.
- 17 November – England qualify for Euro 2000 with a 2–1 aggregate win over Scotland in the qualifying playoff round.
- 25 November – At the Kensington and Chelsea by-election, Michael Portillo holds the seat for the Conservative Party.

=== December ===
- 10 December – Launch of the European Space Agency's XMM-Newton satellite. Information from the satellite is processed at the University of Leicester.
- 30 December – Former Beatle George Harrison, 56, suffers stab wounds after being attacked by an intruder at Friar Park, his mansion near Henley-on-Thames in Oxfordshire.
- 31 December – Millennium celebrations are held across the country including the official opening of the Millennium Dome and the unveiling of the London Eye in London.

== See also ==
- 1999 in Northern Ireland
- 1999 in Scotland
- 1999 in Wales
