= 2000 in England =

- Centuries: 18th; 19th; 20th; 21st
- Decades: 1980s; 1990s; 2000s; 2010s; 2020s
- See also: 1999–2000 in English football 2000–01 in English football 2000 in the United Kingdom; Other events of 2000

Events from 2000 in England

== Incumbent ==
- Monarch - Elizabeth II
- Prime Minister - Tony Blair

== Events ==
=== January ===
- Japanese carmaker Nissan adds a third model to its factory near Sunderland; the new version of the Almera hatchback and saloon, which goes on sale in March.
- 1 January – The Millennium Dome in London is officially opened by the Queen.
- 3 January – Thames Valley Police speak of their belief that the Cézanne painting stolen from Oxford's Ashmolean Museum on New Year's Eve was taken by professional thieves.
- 22 January – The Rugby league 2000 World Club Challenge is won by Melbourne Storm who defeat St. Helens 44 – 6 at the JJB Stadium in Wigan.
- 31 January – Dr. Harold Shipman is sentenced to life imprisonment after being found guilty of murdering 15 patients in Greater Manchester between 1995 and 1998. He is also sentenced to four years in prison, to run concurrently, for forging the will of one of his victims. The subsequent enquiry considers him to have killed at least 215.

=== February ===
- 11 February – The Royal Bank of Scotland succeeds in the hostile takeover battle for its larger English rival, NatWest Bank, successfully defeating a rival offer by the Bank of Scotland.
- 25 February – 8-year-old Victoria Climbié is murdered by her great-aunt and her partner in London. The death will spark a public major changes to child protection policies.
- 28 February – The chief of British Nuclear Fuels resigns over a safety scandal at Sellafield.

=== March ===
- 15 March – BMW announces plans to sell the Rover Group, with London-based Alchemy consortium emerging as favourites for a takeover.
- 31 March – Myra Hindley, who has spent 34 years in prison for her part in the Moors Murders, loses a third High Court appeal against a Home Office ruling that her life sentence should mean life.

=== April ===
- 1 April
  - An Enigma machine is stolen from Bletchley Park Museum.
  - Section 27 of the Access to Justice Act 1999 comes into force allowing recovery of fees from the losing party in civil actions, extending the availability of conditional fee arrangements.
- 3 April – The Immigration and Asylum Act means that all asylum seekers in England and Wales will now receive vouchers to cover the cost of food and clothes.
- 4 April – Charlie Kray, one of the infamous Kray brothers, dies in hospital on the Isle of Wight after suffering a heart attack in Parkhurst Prison at age 73.
- 14 April – Kenneth Noye, the so-called "M25 killer", sentenced to life imprisonment.
- 19 April – Tony Martin is sentenced to life imprisonment for the murder of a 16-year-old burglar, Fred Barras, he shot dead at his Norfolk farmhouse eight months ago. He is also convicted of the attempted murder of Brendon Fearon, the burglar who was wounded when Martin opened fire.
- 29 April – At Murrayfield Stadium in Scotland, the 2000 Challenge Cup tournament culminates in the Bradford Bulls' 24 – 18 win in the final against the Leeds Rhinos.

=== May ===
- 1 May – May Day riot in central London by anti-capitalist protestors. The statue of Winston Churchill in Parliament Square, and the Cenotaph in Whitehall are daubed with graffiti.
- 3 May – The London Stock Exchange and Germany's Deutsche Börse announce merger plans.
- 4 May – London mayoral election: Ken Livingstone elected Mayor of London defeating Steve Norris, the Conservative Party candidate in 2nd place; and Frank Dobson, the Labour Party candidate in 3rd place.
- 4 May – At the Romsey by-election following the death of Conservative MP Michael Colvin, the Liberal Democrat candidate Sandra Gidley wins the seat.
- 12 May
  - The Tate Modern art museum is opened in London.
  - Ford announces that production of cars at its Dagenham plant will discontinue when the Fiesta is replaced in 2002.
- 20 May – Chelsea beat Aston Villa 1–0 to win the last FA Cup final at Wembley Stadium before the old stadium (which is due to close in October) is rebuilt.
- 25 May – National Waste Strategy first published.

=== June ===
- 7 June – Tony Blair receives a hostile reception during a speech at the Women's Institute, where he is heckled and slow hand-clapped by furious members.
- 10 June – The much-anticipated Millennium Bridge in London opens to the public, but has to close after it starts swaying.
- 12 June – The England national football team begins its participation in the European Championships, jointly hosted by the Netherlands and Belgium. They lose their opening group game 3–2 to Portugal despite taking an early 2–0 lead through Paul Scholes and Steve McManaman.
- 17 June – Alan Shearer, who is set to retire from international football after the European Championships, scores the only goal as England beat holders Germany 1–0 in the second group game.
- 18 June – Following a series of hooliganism incidents by England fans, UEFA threatens to expel England from Euro 2000 if there is any further trouble.
- 20 June – England's hopes of winning Euro 2000 are ended when they lose 3–2 to Romania in the final group game, again after taking the lead earlier in the game.
- 22 June – At the Tottenham by-election following the death of Labour MP Bernie Grant, the Labour candidate David Lammy holds the seat.
- 30 June – David Copeland is found guilty of causing the three nail bomb attacks in London last year. He is sentenced to life imprisonment and the trial judge recommends that he should serve at least 30 years before being considered for parole, meaning that he is likely to remain in prison until at least 2029 and the age of 54.

=== July ===
- 5 July – Colin Fallows, driving the Vampire turbojet-propelled dragster, sets a British land speed record, a mean 300.3 mph (483.3 km/h), at Elvington, Yorkshire.
- 17 July – Murder of Sarah Payne: a 6-year-old Surrey girl is found dead in West Sussex, having gone missing sixteen days earlier. On 23 July, the News of the World starts a campaign for Sarah's Law, a child sex offender disclosure scheme.

=== August ===
- 3 August – Rioting erupts on the Paulsgrove estate in Portsmouth after more than 100 people besiege a block of flats allegedly housing a convicted child sex offender, the latest vigilante violence against suspected sex offenders since the beginning of the "naming and shaming" campaign by the News of the World.
- 26 August – Gangster and murderer Reggie Kray, in the 32nd year of his life sentence at Broadmoor Hospital, is released from prison on compassionate grounds by Home Secretary Jack Straw due to bladder cancer from which he is expected to die within weeks.

=== September ===
- 18 September – Survivors of the Southall and Ladbroke Grove rail disasters criticise Railtrack for putting costs ahead of safety and causing a series of blunders which led to the tragedies.
- 23 September
  - Earthquake in Warwickshire.
  - Rower Steve Redgrave wins his fifth consecutive gold medal at the Olympics.

=== October ===
- 1 October – Reggie Kray dies of cancer in a Norwich hotel at the age of 66.
- 3 October – Approximate start of Autumn 2000 Western Europe floods (particularly affecting England) precipitated by days of heavy rain.
- 4 October – After 41 years, production of the Mini car ends at the Longbridge plant owned by MG Rover in Birmingham. The new model will go into production next spring at the Cowley plant in Oxford that is owned by BMW.
- 7 October – Wembley Stadium closes after 77 years. It is set to re-open in 2003 following a complete reconstruction that will see its capacity raised to 90,000 all-seated. In the final game at the old stadium, the England football team loses 1–0 to Germany in their opening qualifying game for the 2002 World Cup and manager Kevin Keegan resigns after 18 months in charge.
- 14 October – In the 2000 Super League Grand Final St Helens defeat Wigan Warriors 29–16 at Old Trafford, Manchester before a crowd of 58,132.
- 17 October – Hatfield rail crash: A Great North Eastern Railway InterCity 225 train derails south of Hatfield station, killing 4 people.
- 26 October – House of Lords delivers judgement in White v White, a landmark case in redistribution of finances and property on divorce.
- 30 October – Sven-Göran Eriksson, the 52-year-old Swedish coach of Italian side Lazio, accepts an offer from the Football Association to take charge of the England team for five years commencing next July. Eriksson will be the first foreign manager to take charge of the England team, but until his arrival the England team will be jointly managed by interim coaches Peter Taylor and Howard Wilkinson.

=== November ===
- 7 November – The theft of £350 million worth of diamonds from the Millennium Dome is foiled by police.
- 16 November – Actor Michael Caine receives a knighthood from the Queen.
- 20 November – Judith Keppel becomes the first person to win £1 million on the television programme Who Wants to Be a Millionaire?
- 23 November
  - The Preston by-election is won by the Labour Party candidate Mark Hendrick.
  - The West Bromwich West by-election is won by the Labour Party candidate Adrian Bailey.
- 26 November – Rio Ferdinand, the 22-year-old England national football team defender, becomes the nation's most expensive player in an £18million transfer from West Ham United to Leeds United.
- 27 November – Damilola Taylor, a 10-year-old school boy originally from Nigeria, is stabbed to death on his way home from school in Peckham, London. On 2 December two teenagers and a 39-year-old man are released on police bail after being arrested in connection with the murder.

=== December ===
- 3 December – The Church of England introduces the Common Worship series of service books.
- 22 December – 32-year-old English film producer Guy Ritchie marries American pop star Madonna, 42, at Skibo Castle in the Scottish Highlands.
- 29 December – Arctic weather conditions blight the country, with heavy snow and temperatures as low as −13C plaguing the country and causing extensive gridlocking on the roads and railways.
- 31 December – The Millennium Dome closes as planned after one year.

== Births ==
- 23 March – Jessica Stretton, archer
- 24 September – Jessica Naz, footballer

== See also ==
- 2000 in Northern Ireland
- 2000 in Scotland
- 2000 in Wales
