= Sian Eirian Rees Davies =

Welsh author

Sian Eirian Rees Davies (born 1981 in Bangor) is a Welsh writer.

She grew up on a Pen Llŷn farm before moving to Morfa Nefyn Primary School and High School, and finally College at Pwllheli. She then studied at Bangor University, gaining a degree in Welsh and Creative Writing and a Masters in Arts. She used to teach Welsh at Yale College, Wrexham, before she went back to Pwllheli.

In 2005, Rees Davies was awarded the Daniel Owen Memorial Prize at the National Eisteddfod of Wales. The award winning book, I Fyd sy Well, was subject to a plagiarism investigation by the Eisteddfod after Elvey Macdonald submitted a complaint stating there were similarities to their book, Yr Hirdaith. A Eisteddfod panel oversaw the complaint and determined there was no case against Sian Eirian Rees Davies. The complaint was closed.

In 2007 Rees Davies worked as a manager at the Cae'r Gors Heritage Centre, Kate Roberts' former house.

== Writing ==
Her works include I Fyd Sy Well (To A Better World, 2005), Nain! Nain! Nain! (Grandma! Grandma! Grandma! 2012), Nerth Bôn Braich (Strength of the Arm, 2008), and Cysgodion Y Coed (Wood Shadows, 2007).
