= 2000 in Wales =

- Centuries: 18th; 19th; 20th; 21st
- Decades: 1980s; 1990s; 2000s; 2010s; 2020s
- See also: List of years in Wales; Timeline of Welsh history 2000 in The United Kingdom England Scotland Elsewhere

This article is about the particular significance of the year 2000 to Wales and its people.

== Incumbents ==
- First Secretary (until 16 October)/First Minister
  - Alun Michael (until 9 February)
  - Rhodri Morgan
- Secretary of State for Wales – Paul Murphy
- Archbishop of Wales – Rowan Williams, Bishop of Monmouth
- Archdruid of the National Eisteddfod of Wales – Meirion Evans

== Events ==
- 3 February – At the Ceredigion by-election, Simon Thomas holds the seat for Plaid Cymru.
- 15 February – North Wales child abuse scandal: Sir Ronald Waterhouse publishes the report of his inquiry into abuse in children's homes in north Wales.
- 24 May – National Botanic Garden of Wales opens near Llanarthney in the Towy Valley, Carmarthenshire (official opening by the Prince of Wales: 21 July).
- August
  - The National Eisteddfod of Wales is held at Llanelli.
  - Donald Wales sets a UK electric land speed record of 220 km/h at Pendine Sands in Bluebird Electric 2.
- 15 October – Dedication of the new organ at St David's Cathedral.
- 16 October – Rhodri Morgan's official title as leader of the Welsh Assembly is changed from First Secretary to First Minister. The post of Deputy First Minister for Wales is simultaneously created, and Mike German is appointed.
- 18 November – Catherine Zeta-Jones marries Michael Douglas at the Plaza Hotel, New York City.
- 14 December – Penderyn whisky begins production.
- The Cardiff Bay Development Corporation is wound up, having achieved its main objective of regenerating the former docklands of Cardiff.
- The Royal Glamorgan Hospital opens at Ynysmaerdy, Talbot Green, near Llantrisant in Rhondda Cynon Taf, to replace East Glamorgan General Hospital.

== Arts and literature ==
- Siân Phillips is appointed a CBE in the Queen's birthday honours list.
- Bryn Terfel's Faenol Festival is launched.
- The Welsh Music Foundation is established.
- Between May and August, over 100 rare maps are stolen from the National Library of Wales. A man later confesses to having stolen and sold them to collectors.

=== Awards ===
- Glyndŵr Award – Robin Huw Bowen
- National Eisteddfod of Wales: Chair – Llion Jones
- National Eisteddfod of Wales: Crown – Dylan Iorwerth
- National Eisteddfod of Wales: Prose Medal – Eurig Wyn, Tri Mochyn Bach
- Wales Book of the Year:
  - English language: Sheenagh Pugh – Stonelight
  - Welsh language: Gwyneth Lewis – Y Llofrudd Iaith
- Gwobr Goffa Daniel Owen – Geraint V. Jones, Cur y Nos

=== New books ===
- Trezza Azzopardi – The Hiding Place
- Ruth Bidgood – Singing to Wolves
- Jon Gower – Big Fish
- Jerry Hunter – Soffestri’r Saeson
- Martin Johnes & Iain McLean – Aberfan: Government and Disasters
- Sheenagh Pugh – Stonelight
- Lorna Sage – Bad Blood
- Owen Sheers – The Blue Book

=== Music ===
- Richard Churches – Requiem Mass
- Larry Goves – walking underground
- Lostprophets – The Fake Sound Of Progress
- Racing Cars – A Bolt from the Blue
- Super Furry Animals – Mwng

== Film ==
=== English-language films ===
- One of the Hollywood Ten, written and directed by Karl Francis
- The Testimony of Taliesin Jones with Jonathan Pryce and Matthew Rhys
- Rancid Aluminium, based on the novel by James Hawes, with Rhys Ifans, Keith Allen and Brian Hibbard.
- 102 Dalmatians, with Ioan Gruffudd and his future wife Alice Evans

=== Welsh-language films ===
- Moth (S4C)

== Broadcasting ==
=== English-language television ===
- Rob Brydon stars in Marion and Geoff

=== Welsh-language television ===
- Cân i Gymru 2000
- Porc Peis Bach
- Hacio

== Sport ==
- BBC Wales Sports Personality of the Year – Tanni Grey-Thompson
- Golf
  - Celtic Manor Wales Open: European Tour tournament first played.
  - Phillip Price is ranked 8th in the world.
- Snooker
  - 13 February – Matthew Stevens wins the Masters.
  - 1 May – Mark Williams wins the World Snooker Championship for the first time, defeating Matthew Stevens in an all-Welsh final.

== Births ==
- 11 May – Ffion Morgan, Welsh international footballer
- 8 August – Dylan Michael Douglas, son of Michael Douglas and Catherine Zeta-Jones
- 18 October – Teddy Williams, rugby union player

== Deaths ==
- 19 January – Rex Willis, Wales international rugby union player, 75
- 19 February – Josef Herman, artist, 88
- 23 February – John Nevill, 5th Marquess of Abergavenny, 85
- 11 March – Will Roberts, painter, 92
- 7 April – Walter Vickery, Wales international rugby player, 90
- 12 April – Ronald Lockley, naturalist, 96
- 20 May – David Pearce, boxer, 41
- 28 May – Donald Davies, computer scientist and inventor, 75
- 30 May – Doris Hare, actress, 95
- 10 July – Dilwyn Lewis, designer, 76
- 19 July – Philip Jones, civil servant, 69
- 26 July – Albert Fear, Wales international rugby player, 92
- 25 August – Dennis David, RAF ace, 82
- 17 September – Paula Yates, television presenter (born in Colwyn Bay), 41 (suicide)
- 25 September – R. S. Thomas, poet, 87
- 30 September – Howard Winstone, boxing champion, 61
- 11 November – Sir Alun Talfan Davies, judge, 87
- December – George Evans, footballer, 65
- 2 December – Rosemarie Frankland, former Miss World, 57 (drug overdose)
- 22 December – Harry Payne, Wales international rugby player, 93
- date unknown – Doug Rees, footballer

== See also ==
- 2000 in England
- 2000 in Northern Ireland
- 2000 in Scotland
