= 1998 in Scotland =

- Centuries: 18th; 19th; 20th; 21st
- Decades: 1970s; 1980s; 1990s; 2000s; 2010s
- See also: List of years in Scotland; Timeline of Scottish history 1998 in: The UK • England • Wales • Elsewhere; Scottish football: 1997–98 • 1998–99; 1998 in Scottish television

Events from the year 1998 in Scotland.

== Incumbents ==
- Secretary of State for Scotland and Keeper of the Great Seal – Donald Dewar

=== Law officers ===
- Lord Advocate – Lord Hardie
- Solicitor General for Scotland – Colin Boyd

=== Judiciary ===
- Lord President of the Court of Session and Lord Justice General – Lord Rodger of Earlsferry
- Lord Justice Clerk – Lord Cullen
- Chairman of the Scottish Land Court – Lord McGhie

== Events ==
- 7 March – Outer Hebrides community radio station Isles FM is launched, broadcasting from studios in Stornoway.
- 31 March – The last Northern Lighthouse Board lighthouse is converted to automatic operation without resident keepers, Fair Isle South.
- 25 May – Torness Nuclear Power Station commissioned near the town of Dunbar, East Lothian.
- 31 May – The Sky Scottish satellite television channel closes after eighteen months on air.
- 10 June – Scotland open the 1998 World Cup, playing champions Brazil in France, though they lose 2–1 after a deflected goal in the seventy-sixth minute.
- 16 June – Scotland draw 1–1 against Norway in their second game of the World Cup.
- 23 June – Scotland lose 3–0 to Morocco in their final group stage match of the world Cup, failing to qualify for the next round.
- August – Edinburgh Modular Arm System, the world's first bionic arm, is fitted.
- 24 August – The Netherlands is selected as the venue for the trial of the two Libyans who are charged with the Lockerbie aircraft bombing that killed 270 people in December 1988.
- 5 October – Fife radio station Kingdom FM is launched, broadcasting from studios in Markinch.
- November – Scottish Socialist Party established.
- 19 November – The Scotland Act, the legislation to set up a devolved unicameral Scottish Parliament, receives its royal assent.
- 30 November – new Museum of Scotland opened in Edinburgh.
- 26 December – great Boxing Day Storm: severe gale force winds hit Ireland, southern Scotland and northern England. Roads, railways and electricity are disrupted.

== Births ==
- 1 March – Mili Smith, curler
- 23 May – Ross Cunningham, footballer
- 19 July – Erin Cuthbert, footballer
- 22 September – Isis Hainsworth, actress
- 20 October – Jordan Allan, footballer

== Deaths ==
- 10 March – Ian Dunn, gay and paedophile rights activist, founder of the Scottish Minorities Group (born 1943)
- 7 April – James McIntosh Patrick, landscape painter (born 1907)
- 15 October – Iain Crichton Smith, poet (born 1928)
- 21 October – Sir Alec Cairncross, economist (born 1911)
- November – Robin Hall, folk singer (born 1936)
- 8 November – Rumer Godden, novelist (born 1907 in England)

== The arts ==
- Martyn Bennett's Celtic fusion album Bothy Culture is released.
- Kevin MacNeil's poetry collection Love and Zen in the Outer Hebrides is published in Edinburgh.
- The BBC Scotland television drama Looking After Jo Jo, starring Robert Carlyle, is screened.

== See also ==
- 1998 in Northern Ireland
