= 1996 in England =

- Centuries: 18th; 19th; 20th; 21st
- Decades: 1970s; 1980s; 1990s; 2000s; 2010s
- See also: 1995–96 in English football 1996–97 in English football 1996 in the United Kingdom; Other events of 1996

Events from 1996 in England

== Incumbent ==
- Monarch - Elizabeth II
- Prime Minister - John Major

== Events ==
- 1 January – One man is killed and two others are wounded after they attempted to prevent an armed robbery from taking place in Bristol.
- 4 January – A fifteen-year-old boy is charged with the murder of London headmaster Philip Lawrence, who was stabbed to death outside his school in Maida Vale on 8 December last year.
- 10 January – Terry Venables, manager of the England national football team, announces that he will resign from his position after this summer's European Championships as he wishes to spend the later part of this year concentrating on clearing his name in connection with legal disputes with his former business partner, the Tottenham Hotspur chairman Alan Sugar.
- 18 January – Six major environmental organisations add their support to the campaign over the Newbury By-pass in Berkshire.
- 14 February – Bob Paisley, the most successful manager in English football during his spell as Liverpool manager between 1974 and 1983, dies at the age of 77. Paisley, who was born in County Durham, had suffered from Alzheimer's disease for five years.
- 24 March – Aston Villa match Liverpool's record of five Football League Cup wins by defeating Leeds United 3–0 in the final at Wembley Stadium.
- 25 April – The private prosecution of three men for the murder of Black London teenager Stephen Lawrence collapses. Lawrence, 18, was fatally stabbed in Eltham three years earlier after being set upon by a gang of five White youths who hurled racist insults at him and his friend Duwayne Brooks, who escaped unharmed.
- April 27 – The 1996 Challenge Cup tournament culminates in St. Helens' 40–32 victory over Bradford Bulls in the final at London's Wembley Stadium before a crowd of 75,994.
- 2 May – The Football Association confirms that Glenn Hoddle, Chelsea manager, will be appointed as coach of the England national football team after the upcoming European Championships.
- 5 May – Manchester United are confirmed Premier League champions for the third time in four seasons.
- 11 May – Eric Cantona, FWA Player of the Year for this season, scores a late winner against Liverpool in the FA Cup Final to ensure that Manchester United win it for a record ninth time, and become the first team in England to win the double twice.
- 16 May – Timothy Morss and Brett Tyler admit to the murder of nine-year-old Daniel Handley at the Old Bailey. They lured Daniel into their car in South London in October 1994 and murdered him before dumping his body near Bristol where it was found four months later. They are both sentenced to life imprisonment and trial judge, who condemns them as "vultures", recommends that they should never be released.
- 22 May – Millionaire businessman Owen Oyston, 62-year-old chairman of Blackpool football club, is sentenced to six years in prison after being found guilty of rape and indecent assault against a sixteen-year-old female model.
- 27 May – Shakespeare's Globe, the reconstruction of William Shakespeare's Globe Theatre, opens in London.
- 8 June – The UEFA Euro 1996, hosted by England begins. The first match, England vs Switzerland takes place at Wembley Stadium, London. It ends in a 1–1 draw.
- 18 June – England reach the quarter-finals of Euro 96 with a spectacular 4–1 win over the Netherlands.
- 22 June – England beat Spain on penalties after drawing 0–0 in the Euro 96 quarter-final.
- 26 June – England lose the Euro 96 semi-final on penalties to Germany after a 1–1 draw. Rioting breaks out across the country, the worst incident in Trafalgar Square, London, resulting in some 200 arrests.
- 8 July – Three young children and four adults are attacked by a man with a machete at a nursery school in the Blakenhall area of Wolverhampton.
- 10 July – Police find the bodies of 45-year-old Lin Russell and her six-year-old daughter Megan near the village of Nonington in Kent. Lin's other daughter, nine-year-old Josie, survived the attack with massive head injuries. The killer is believed to have performed the attack with a hammer.
- 15 July – Horrett Campbell, 33, is arrested on seven counts of attempted murder following last week's machete attack at a Wolverhampton nursery school.
- 18 July – Howard Hughes, 31, is sentenced to life imprisonment for the abduction, rape and murder of seven-year-old Sophie Hook at Llandudno, North Wales, 12 months ago. The trial judge recommends that Hughes should never be released from prison.
- 20 July – Caroline Dickinson, a thirteen-year-old Cornish girl, is raped and murdered at a hostel in Brittany where she was staying on a school trip.
- 29 July – Alan Shearer becomes the world's most expensive footballer when Newcastle United F.C. pay £15,000,000 for him. It beats the previous world record that was set four years ago when AC Milan of Italy signed Gianluigi Lentini for £13,000,000 and is almost double the previous national record of £8,400,000 that Liverpool paid for Stan Collymore last year. The rising wealth of football in England since the creation of the Premier League four years ago is reflected in the fact that Shearer became the country's most expensive footballer back in 1992 for a fee of £3,600,000 - less than a quarter of his latest fee.
- 11 August – Alan Shearer makes his debut for Newcastle United at Wembley Stadium, where they lose 4–0 to Manchester United in the FA Charity Shield.
- 17 August – On the first day of the English league season, David Beckham scores a spectacular goal from inside his own half as Manchester United beat Wimbledon 3–0 at Selhurst Park.
- 16 October – 37-year-old Dorset lorry driver Stuart Morgan is sentenced to life imprisonment for the murder of French student Céline Figard, whose body was found in Worcestershire ten months ago.
- 17 October – It is reported that England footballer Paul Gascoigne has assaulted his wife Sheryl.
- 22 October – Chelsea FC Vice-Chairman Matthew Harding dies in a helicopter crash in Cheshire on his way home from a Football League Cup game at Bolton Wanderers.
- 31 October – Ridings High School in Halifax is closed down due to severe disorder that left the local education authority feeling that pupil and staff safety could not be guaranteed.
- 19 November – Former England manager Terry Venables, currently chairman of Portsmouth F.C., accepts an offer to coach the Australia national football team.
- 29 November – John West, younger brother of serial killer Fred West, is found hanged at his Gloucester home. Mr West, 54, was on trial for the rape of two young women - including Fred's daughter Ann-Marie.
- 1 December – Lee Harvey, a 25-year-old Alvechurch man, is stabbed to death in a reported road rage attack on a country lane near Redditch in Worcestershire.
- 7 December – Sir John Gorst, 68-year-old Conservative MP for Hendon North in London, announces his resignation, leaving his party without a majority in the House of Commons.
- 9 December – A jury at Stafford Crown Court finds Horrett Campbell guilty on all seven counts of attempted murder relating to the Wolverhampton nursery machete attack five months previously. Campbell, 34, was scheduled to be sentenced in March.
- 19 December – Lee Harvey's girlfriend Tracie Andrews is charged with his murder, less than three weeks after his death was reported as the result of a "road rage" attack. She is freed on bail.
- 20 December – A police hunt begins in Chester for nine-year-old Kayleigh Ward, who went missing on the previous evening in the Blacon area of the city.
- 22 December – Peter Shilton, the 47-year-old former England goalkeeper, becomes the first player to make 1,000 Football League appearances when he plays for Leyton Orient in their 2–0 win over Brighton & Hove Albion in a Division Three game at Brisbane Road, London.

== Births ==
- 3 January – Florence Pugh, actress
- 7 January – Katherine Rednall, lawn bowler
- 29 January – Ellie Aldridge, sailor
- 1 June – Tom Holland, actor
- 28 December – Demie-Jade Resztan, boxer

== See also ==
- 1996 in Northern Ireland
- 1996 in Scotland
- 1996 in Wales
