= 2004 in Scotland =

- Centuries: 19th; 20th; 21st
- Decades: 1980s; 1990s; 2000s; 2010s; 2020s
- See also: List of years in Scotland; Timeline of Scottish history 2004 in: The UK • England • Wales • Elsewhere; Scottish football: 2003–04 • 2004–05; 2004 in Scottish television

Events from the year 2004 in Scotland.

== Incumbents ==
- First Minister and Keeper of the Great Seal – Jack McConnell
- Secretary of State for Scotland – Alistair Darling

=== Law officers ===
- Lord Advocate – Lord Boyd of Duncansby
- Solicitor General for Scotland – Elish Angiolini
- Advocate General for Scotland – Lynda Clark

=== Judiciary ===
- Lord President of the Court of Session and Lord Justice General – Lord Cullen of Whitekirk
- Lord Justice Clerk – Lord Gill
- Chairman of the Scottish Land Court – Lord McGhie

== Events ==
=== January ===
- January – a 428 million-year-old fossil Pneumodesmus found at Stonehaven is identified as the world's oldest-known creature to have lived on land.

=== February ===
- 16 February – Edwin Morgan becomes Scotland's first ever official national poet, The Scots Makar, appointed by the Scottish Parliament.

=== March ===
- 16 March – Fifteen-year-old Kriss Donald is abducted, tortured and murdered by a Pakistani gang in a racially motivated attack in Glasgow. This would be notorious for the first ever conviction for racially motivated murder in Scotland.

=== May ===
- 9 May – "Loch Fyne accord": an informal discussion in the car park of the Loch Fyne Oyster Bar near Cairndow between John Prescott (Deputy Prime Minister) and Gordon Brown is supposed to have agreed the latter's succession to Tony Blair as Prime Minister of the United Kingdom.
- 11 May – Stockline Plastics factory explosion: nine people die in an explosion at a factory in Glasgow.
- May – "The Bruce Tree" at Strathleven in West Dunbartonshire, an oak once in the ownership of Robert the Bruce, falls as a result of arson.

=== June ===
- 2 June – The Dalai Lama addresses the Scottish Parliament as part of his trip to Scotland.
- 6 June – Sixtieth anniversary of D-Day. Last minute pressure forces First Minister of Scotland Jack McConnell to attend commemorations.

=== July ===
- 22 July – The Scottish Parliament (Constituencies) Act, which breaks the link between the number of Scottish MPs and the number of MSPs, receives Royal Assent.

=== August ===
- 18 August – A landslide in Glen Ogle traps 57 motorists on the A85.

=== September ===
- 3 September – Alex Salmond wins the Scottish National Party leadership election, succeeding John Swinney. Nicola Sturgeon becomes the Leader of the SNP in the Scottish Parliament and the Leader of the Opposition.

=== October ===
- 9 October – Scottish Parliament Building in Edinburgh, designed by Enric Miralles, is formally opened.
- 17 October – Three men are murdered in a flat in Crosshill, Glasgow by Edith McAlinden along with her seventeen-year-old son and his friend. The crime is dubbed the "House of Blood murders".

=== November ===
- 18 November – Daanish Zahid becomes the first person to be convicted of racially motivated murder in Scotland, for killing Kriss Donald.

== Births ==
- Full date unknown – Jack Henderson, artist and charity fundraiser

== Deaths ==
- 27 January – Rikki Fulton, comedian, surviving half of Francie and Josie (born 1924)
- 1 February – Ally MacLeod, former manager of the Scotland national football team (born 1931)
- 26 February – Russell Hunter, actor (born 1925)
- 9 March – Alexander Goudie, painter (born 1933)

== The arts ==
- 26 January – serialisation of Alexander McCall Smith's novel 44 Scotland Street, set in Edinburgh, begins in The Scotsman.
- Summer – first East Neuk Festival.
- 28 September – publication of Alexander McCall Smith's novel The Sunday Philosophy Club set in Edinburgh.
- Edinburgh becomes UNESCO's first City of Literature.

== See also ==
- 2004 in Northern Ireland
