= 1997 in England =

- Centuries: 18th; 19th; 20th; 21st
- Decades: 1970s; 1980s; 1990s; 2000s; 2010s
- See also: 1996–97 in English football 1997–98 in English football 1997 in the United Kingdom; Other events of 1997

Events from 1997 in England

== Incumbent ==
- Monarch - Elizabeth II
- Prime Minister - John Major (until 2 May) Tony Blair (from 2 May)

== Events ==
=== January ===
- 1 January – Police in Sutton Coldfield, near Birmingham, launch a murder hunt after 17-year-old student Nicola Dixon is found bludgeoned to death in an alleyway in the town.
- 4 January – Tony Bullimore, a lone yachtsman, is feared drowned after his boat capsizes in the Indian Ocean.
- 8 January – Kevin Keegan stuns the football world by announcing his resignation as manager of FA Premier League title chasers Newcastle United. He had been in charge of the club since February 1992 when they were on the brink of relegation from the old Football League Second Division, but swiftly turned their fortunes around as they won promotion to the FA Premier League in 1993 and have finished in the top six every season since then, including the last football season where they were narrowly beaten to the title by Manchester United.
- 9 January – Tony Bullimore is found safe and well after being spotted by the crew of an Australian navy ship.
- 14 January – Kenny Dalglish, who managed Liverpool to three league titles between 1986 and 1990 and won the 1995 FA Premier League title with Blackburn Rovers, is appointed manager of Newcastle United.
- 16 January – The Conservative Party government loses its majority in the House of Commons after the death of Iain Mills, MP for Meriden.
- 17 January
  - A jury at the Old Bailey rules that 86-year-old Szymon Serafinowicz is unfit to stand trial on charges of murdering Jews during the Holocaust.
  - East 17 singer Brian Harvey is dismissed from the band after publicly commenting that the drug Ecstasy is safe.
- 20 January – Death of Labour Party MP Martin Redmond ends the government's minority.

=== February ===
- 3 February – Miles Evans, a 23-year-old soldier from Warminster in Wiltshire, is charged with the murder of his nine-year-old stepdaughter Zoe, who was reported missing on 9 January. Her body has not been found, but police are convinced that she is dead because they have found bloodstained clothing in the search for her.
- 6 February – The Court of Appeal rules that Mrs Diane Blood of Leeds can be inseminated with her dead husband's sperm. Mrs Blood had been challenging for the right to use the sperm of her husband Stephen since just after his death two years ago.
- 10 February – Louise Woodward, an 18-year-old au pair from Elton in Cheshire, is charged with the murder of nine-month-old Matthew Eappen, a baby in her care who died yesterday four days after being admitted to hospital in the United States.
- 14 February- Jurors at the inquest into the death of Stephen Lawrence rule that the black teenager was unlawfully killed "in a completely unprovoked racist attack by five white youths".
- 15 February – 13-year-old Billie-Jo Jenkins is found dead after being battered at her foster father's home in Hastings, East Sussex.
- 21 February – Three men who have spent 18 years in prison after being convicted of murdering 13-year-old Carl Bridgewater in 1978 have their convictions overturned by the Court of Appeal.
- 22 February – Scientists at the Roslin Institute announce the birth of a cloned sheep named Dolly seven months after the fact.
- 25 February
  - John Major promises to privatise the London Underground by the year 2000 if the Conservatives are re-elected this year.
  - A girl's body found in the River Dee near Chester today is identified as that of nine-year-old Kayleigh Ward, who went missing in the Blacon area of the city on 19 December last year.
- 26 February – John O'Shaughnessy, 30, is charged with the rape and murder of Kayleigh Ward.
- 27 February – The government loses its Commons majority again after the Labour victory at the Wirral South by-election.

=== March ===
- 9 March – Chesterfield, the Division Two club, reach the FA Cup semi-final for the first time in their history by beating fellow Division Two club Wrexham 1–0 in the quarter-final.
- 10 March – Three people die and more than 60 are injured in a multiple pile-up caused by thick fog on the M42 motorway south of Birmingham.
- 14 March – Sion Jenkins, a 39-year-old deputy headmaster, is charged with murdering his foster daughter Billie-Jo Jenkins.
- 19 March – Manchester United F.C. complete a 4–0 aggregate win over the Portuguese champions F.C. Porto to reach the European Cup semi finals for the first time in 28 years.
- 26 March
  - Andrew Devine, who was left in a persistent vegetative state by brain damage suffered in the Hillsborough disaster in April 1989, is reported to have emerged from the coma-like condition after being able to communicate to his family by using a touch-sensitive switch.
  - Middlesbrough F.C. lose an appeal against a three-point deduction imposed upon them for cancelling a game against Blackburn Rovers FC, despite chairman Steve Gibson and manager Bryan Robson insisting that it was impossible to field a team for the game due to so many players being unavailable through injury or illness. The points deduction eventually results in Middlesbrough being relegated from the FA Premier League.

=== April ===
- April – Nursery Education Voucher Scheme introduced, guaranteeing a government-funded contribution to the cost of preschool education for 4-year-olds.
- 6 April – Leicester City and Middlesbrough draw 1–1 in the Football League Cup final at Wembley Stadium, forcing a replay at Hillsborough later this month.
- 8 April – BBC journalist Martin Bell announces that he is to stand as a candidate against Neil Hamilton in the Tatton constituency on an anti-corruption platform.
- 11 April – Eight male teenagers are found guilty of raping a 32-year-old Austrian woman in King's Cross, London.
- 16 April – Leicester City win the Football League Cup for the second time in their history with a 1–0 replay win over Middlesbrough.
- 18 April – The teenagers who gang raped the Austrian woman are sentenced to between 10 and 12 years in prison at the Old Bailey.
- 22 April – Middlesbrough reach the FA Cup final for the first time in their history by beating Chesterfield 3–0 in the semi-final replay.
- 23 April
  - Denis Compton, the legendary cricketer and footballer, dies at the age of 78.
  - Manchester United's hopes of winning the European Cup are ended when they are eliminated from the semi-finals by German champions Borussia Dortmund.
- 28 April – Lord Taylor of Gosforth, famous for the Taylor Report into the Hillsborough disaster which resulted in all-seater stadiums being made compulsory in top division football, dies aged 66.

=== May ===
- 2 May – Being the leader of the party holding a majority after the General Election, Tony Blair MP is appointed Prime Minister of the United Kingdom by The Queen.
- 3 May – Katrina and the Waves win the Eurovision Song Contest with the song Love Shine a Light, the first time the UK has won the competition since 1981.
- 4 May – Manchester United F.C. win the Premier League title for the fourth time in five seasons without kicking a ball, as their last remaining contenders Newcastle United F.C. and Liverpool F.C. fail to win their penultimate games of the season.
- 17 May – Chelsea F.C. beat Middlesbrough F.C. 2–0 in the FA Cup final at Wembley Stadium to win their first major trophy for 26 years, while it is a personal triumph for their 34-year-old Dutch player-manager Ruud Gullit who becomes the first black manager and the first foreign manager to win a major trophy in England.
- 18 May – The football world is stunned by the retirement of Manchester United captain Eric Cantona six days before his 31st birthday.
- 29 May – Harrods owner Mohammed Al Fayed buys Fulham F.C., newly promoted to Division Two, for £30million.

=== June ===
- 2 June – The Halifax Building Society floats on the London Stock Exchange. Over 7.5 million customers of the Society become shareholders of the new bank, the largest extension of shareholders in UK history.
- 12 June – Law lords declare that former Home Secretary, Michael Howard, acted illegally in raising the minimum sentence of the Bulger killers Robert Thompson and Jon Venables to 15 years. They also strip the government of setting minimum terms for prisoners aged under 18 who had received life or indefinite prison sentences.
- 19 June – McDonald's wins the "McLibel" libel case, the longest trial in English legal history, against two environmental campaigners.
- 20 June – Charlie Kray, 71-year-old brother of the Kray Twins, is found guilty of planning a £39million cocaine smuggling deal.
- 23 June – Charlie Kray is jailed for 12 years.
- 26 June – Home Secretary Jack Straw launches a fresh inquiry into the Hillsborough disaster.
- 27 June – Manchester United sign the England national football team striker Teddy Sheringham from Tottenham Hotspur for £3.5million.

=== July ===
- 29 July – Tracie Andrews is found guilty of murdering her fiancée Lee Harvey, who was stabbed to death on a Worcestershire country lane nearly eight months ago in what she claimed was a road rage attack. Andrews, 28, is sentenced to life imprisonment with a recommended minimum of 14 years.
- 31 July – At the Uxbridge by-election, John Randall holds the seat for the Conservatives.

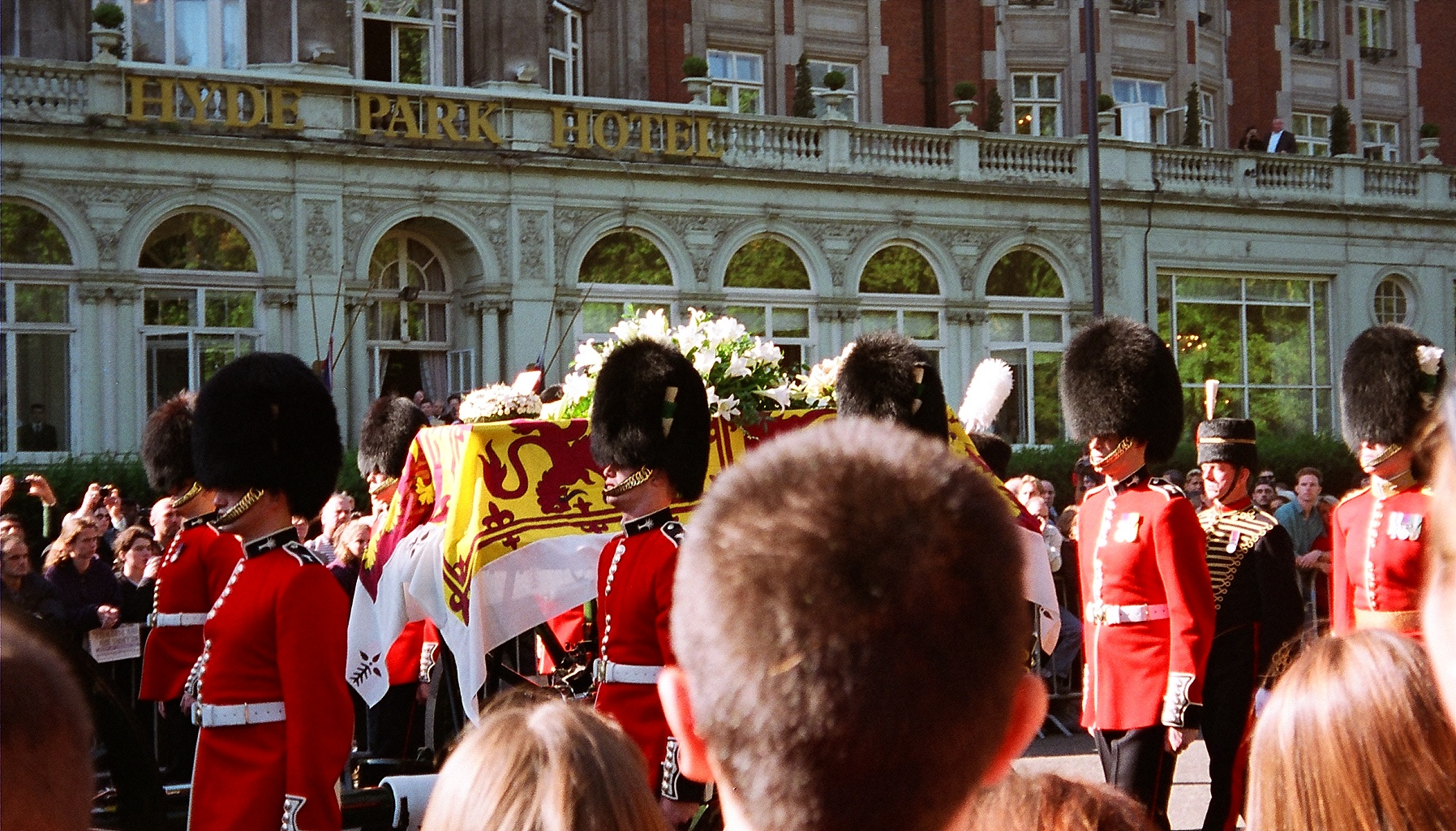
The funeral cortege of Diana, Princess of Wales

=== August ===
- 3 August – Manchester United win the FA Charity Shield on penalties after drawing 1–1 with Chelsea at Wembley.
- 18 August – An 11-year-old Bedfordshire boy is due to become Britain's youngest father, as his 15-year-old girlfriend is expecting a baby.

=== September ===
- 2 September – 18-year-old West Ham United FC defender Rio Ferdinand, the youngest current member of the England football team, is dropped from the squad after being found guilty on a drink-driving charge for which he receives a one-year ban from driving.
- 6 September – The funeral of Diana, Princess of Wales takes place at Westminster Abbey, London followed by a private burial at the estate of the Earls Spencer in Althorp, Northamptonshire. The Earl Spencer, brother of Diana, attacks the Royal Family's treatment of Diana in his funeral eulogy. TV coverage of the funeral is hosted by both BBC 1 and ITV, attracting an audience of more than 32,000,000 which falls just short of the national TV audience record set by the England national football team's victorious World Cup final in 1966.
- 10 September – The England football team beat Moldova 4–0 in their penultimate World Cup qualifying game at Wembley. They only need a draw against Italy in Rome next month to qualify automatically.
- 13 September – Release of Elton John's Candle in the Wind remade as a tribute to Diana, Princess of Wales. This will be the second best-selling single worldwide of all time.
- 19 September – Southall rail crash: passenger train collides with a freight train at Southall, West London killing six people.
- 25 September – Eight months after leaving Newcastle United, Kevin Keegan returns to football as a director of football at Division Two club Fulham. The former England midfielder Ray Wilkins is appointed team manager. Chairman Mohammed Al Fayed is targeting Premier League football for the West London club by 2002.

=== October ===
- 1 October – The final LTI FX4 London cab is produced after 39 years.
- 11 October – England qualify for the Football World Cup with a 0–0 draw against Italy in Rome.
- 15 October – Andy Green driving the ThrustSSC sets a new land speed record of 763.035 mph (1227.99 km/h), the first time the sound barrier is broken on land.
- 20 October – Michael Stone, 37, is charged with the murder of Lin Russell and her six-year-old daughter Megan, who were found bludgeoned to death in Chillenden, Kent, 15 months ago. He is also charged with the attempted murder of Mrs Russell's other daughter Josie, who was nine at the time.
- 24 October – WPC Nina Mackay, 25, is stabbed to death in Stratford, London, when entering a flat to arrest a Somali asylum seeker who was due to be deported.
- 29 October – Lawrence Dallaglio is appointed captain of the England rugby team.
- 31 October – Au pair Louise Woodward found guilty of the second degree murder of an eight-month-old child in her care in the US. She is jailed for life with a minimum of 20 years.

=== November ===
- 10 November – Louise Woodward's second degree murder conviction is reduced to manslaughter on appeal, and her life sentence is replaced by one of 279 days – the amount of time she had already spent in custody on remand. She is released from prison.
- 12 November – Brazil's Supreme Court refuses to extradite the Great Train Robber Ronnie Biggs to Britain.
- 18 November – Tottenham Hotspur, the struggling Premier League club, appoint Swiss coach Christian Gross as their new manager.
- 20 November – At the Beckenham by-election, Jacqui Lait holds the seat for the Conservatives.
- 20 November – At the Winchester by-election, Mark Oaten holds the seat for the Liberal Democrats.
- 24 November – The British Library opens its first public reading room at its new London site on the Euston Road.

=== December ===
- 5 December – Chester man John O'Shaughnessy, 31, is jailed for life after admitting the rape and murder of nine-year-old Kayleigh Ward in the Blacon area of the city 12 months ago. The trial judge recommends that he should serve at least 30 years before being considered for parole.
- 10 December – John E. Walker wins the Nobel Prize in Chemistry jointly with Paul D. Boyer "for their elucidation of the enzymatic mechanism underlying the synthesis of adenosine triphosphate (ATP)".
- 19 December
  - William Hague marries Ffion Jenkins.
  - Moors murderer Myra Hindley loses a High Court appeal against the whole life tariff which was imposed on her by Home Secretary David Waddington in 1990 and later confirmed by Waddington's successor Michael Howard.
- 22 December
  - Twelve people are arrested during protests by disabled people outside Downing Street.
  - German striker Jürgen Klinsmann, who spent the 1994–95 season at Tottenham Hotspur, returns to the club in a £175,000 move from Sampdoria of Italy as new manager Christian Gross attempts to drag the North London side clear of relegation trouble.
- 24 December – Will Straw, son of Cabinet minister Jack Straw, is arrested on suspicion of supplying cannabis.
- 31 December – Singer Elton John and football legend Tom Finney among the men receiving knighthoods in the New Year's Honours List.

== Births ==
- 1 April – Asa Butterfield, actor
- 1 October – Aimee Challenor, politician and transgender activist
- 3 December – Phoebe Paterson Pine, Paralympic archer

== Deaths ==
- 10 January – Alexander R. Todd, Baron Todd, Scottish biochemist, winner of the Nobel Prize in Chemistry (born 1907 in Scotland)

== See also ==
- 1997 in Northern Ireland
- 1997 in Scotland
- 1997 in Wales
