= 2001 in Wales =

- Centuries: 19th; 20th; 21st
- Decades: 1980s; 1990s; 2000s; 2010s; 2020s
- See also: List of years in Wales; Timeline of Welsh history 2001 in The United Kingdom England Scotland Elsewhere

This article is about the particular significance of the year 2001 to Wales and its people.

== Incumbents ==
- First Minister – Rhodri Morgan
- Secretary of State for Wales – Paul Murphy
- Archbishop of Wales – Rowan Williams
- Archdruid of the National Eisteddfod of Wales – Meirion Evans

== Events ==
- 1 March – Peter Clarke is appointed Children's Commissioner for Wales.
- 1 June – Official opening of Cardiff Bay Barrage.
- 7 June – In the UK general election:
  - Plaid Cymru retain a total of 4 seats. They lose Ynys Môn to Labour but Adam Price gains Carmarthen East and Dinefwr from Labour's Alan Williams.
  - Newly elected Labour MPs include Hywel Francis (Aberavon), Mark Tami (Alyn and Deeside), Wayne David (Caerphilly), Ian Lucas (Wrexham) and Chris Bryant (Rhondda)
  - Kevin Brennan replaces Rhodri Morgan as MP for Cardiff West.
- 16 June – Entrepreneur Terry Matthews is knighted in the Queen's Birthday Honours list.
- 11 July – Welsh language pressure group Cymuned is launched at a meeting in Mynytho.
- 1 August – Coleg Harlech Workers' Educational Association (North Wales) is created through the merger of The Workers' Educational Association (North Wales) and Coleg Harlech.
- 16 September – To commemorate "Glyndwr Day", actress Siân Phillips unveils a memorial statue to Catrin Glyndŵr in London.
- 26 October – A memorial service to celebrate the life of Harry Secombe is held at Westminster Abbey and attended by the Prince of Wales (now Charles III).

== Arts and literature ==
- 15 March – Julien Macdonald is chosen as fashion house Givenchy's new designer.
- 24 March – Opening of the exhibition Let Paul Robeson Sing! in Cardiff.
- 15 December – Rob Brydon wins Best TV Comedy Actor award in the British Comedy Awards.
- 25 December – Matthew Rhys and Tom Ward star in a TV adaptation of The Lost World.
- November – John Bourne establishes the Wrexham Stuckists group of artists.
- Jessica Garlick makes the last ten in the first series of Pop Idol.
- Andrew Vicari sells a collection of 125 paintings of the First Gulf War to Prince Khaled of Saudi Arabia for £17 million.
- Irish photographer Paul Seawright is awarded a personal chair by the University of Wales, Newport.

=== Awards ===
- Prix Hélène Rochas – Rebecca Evans
- Cardiff Singer of the World – Marius Brenciu
- Glyndŵr Award – John Meirion Morris

=== National Eisteddfod (held in Denbigh) ===
- National Eisteddfod of Wales: Chair – Mererid Hopwood (first woman ever to win the chair)
- National Eisteddfod of Wales: Crown – Penri Roberts
- National Eisteddfod of Wales: Prose Medal – Elfyn Pritchard
- Wales Book of the Year:
  - English language: Stephen Knight – Mr Schnitzel
  - Welsh language: Owen Martell – Cadw dy ffydd, brawd
- Gwobr Goffa Daniel Owen -

=== New books ===
==== English language ====
- Malcolm Pryce – Aberystwyth Mon Amour
- Alastair Reynolds – Chasm City
- Jon Ronson – Them: Adventures with Extremists
- Carole Seymour-Jones – Painted Shadow: The Life of Vivienne Eliot, First Wife of T.S. Eliot

==== Welsh language ====
- Roger Boore and Rhian Nest James – Hoff Hwiangerddi
- Gwynfor Evans – Cymru o Hud
- Tudur Dylan Jones – Adenydd
- Angharad Tomos – Cnonyn Aflonydd

=== Music ===
- Feeder – Echo Park (album)
- Hilary Tann – The Grey Tide and the Green, commissioned for the Last Night of the Welsh Proms and performed by the Royal Liverpool Philharmonic Orchestra conducted by Owain Arwel Hughes
- Catatonia – Paper Scissors Stone (album)
- Goldie Lookin' Chain – Don't Blame the Chain (album)
- Melys – Chinese Whispers (album)
- Terris – "Fabricated Lunacy" (single) and Learning to Let Go (debut album)

== Film ==
- John Rhys-Davies makes his first appearance as Gimli in The Lord of the Rings: The Fellowship of the Ring.
- Sara Sugarman writes and directs Very Annie Mary, featuring Welsh stars such as Jonathan Pryce, Kenneth Griffith, Matthew Rhys, Ioan Gruffudd, Mary Hopkin and Ruth Madoc.
- Rhys Ifans co-stars in The Shipping News.
- A Bollywood film, Mein Dil Tujhko Diya (I Gave You my Heart), is shot in Aberystwyth and the Elan Valley.
- In Gosford Park, Jeremy Northam plays a fictionalised version of Ivor Novello. Several of Novello's songs feature in the film's soundtrack.
- Nia Roberts stars in A Day Out.

=== Welsh-language films ===
- Against the Dying of the Light
- Y Delyn

== Broadcasting ==
=== Welsh-language television ===
- Y Stafell Ddirgel (drama serial)

=== English-language television ===
- The Bench

== Sport ==
- BBC Wales Sports Personality of the Year – Joe Calzaghe
- Football – Liverpool F.C. win the FA Cup the first time it is played in Cardiff's Millennium Stadium.

== Births ==
- 23 March – Dream Alliance, racehorse bred near Blackwood

== Deaths ==
- 11 January – Lorna Sage, critic, 57 (emphysema)
- 20 January – Crispin Nash-Williams, mathematician, 68
- 18 February – Claude Davey, Wales international rugby union captain, 92
- 22 February – Cledwyn Hughes, Lord Cledwyn of Penrhos, former Secretary of State for Wales, 84
- 11 April – Sir Harry Secombe, singer and comedian, 79
- 16 April – Henry Morgan Lloyd, clergyman, 89
- 26 April – Dafydd Rowlands, minister and writer, 69
- 30 April – Brian Morris, Baron Morris of Castle Morris, poet, critic and politician, 71
- 25 May – Delme Bryn-Jones, operatic baritone, 67
- 10 June – Samuel Ifor Enoch, theologian, 86
- 17 July – Val Feld, the first member of the Welsh Assembly to die, 53 (cancer)
- 19 July – Roderic Bowen, MP, 87
- August – Valerie Davies, Olympic swimmer, 89
- 19 September – Rhys Jones, archaeologist, 60
- October – John Owen, television writer (suicide)
- 6 December – Eryl Stephen Thomas, former Bishop of Monmouth and of Llandaff, 91
- 7 December – Ray Powell, MP, 73

== See also ==
- 2001 in Northern Ireland
