= 1998 in England =

- Centuries: 18th; 19th; 20th; 21st
- Decades: 1970s; 1980s; 1990s; 2000s; 2010s
- See also: 1997–98 in English football 1998–99 in English football 1998 in the United Kingdom; Other events of 1998

Events from 1998 in England

== Incumbent ==
- Monarch – Elizabeth II
- Prime Minister - Tony Blair

== Events ==
- 16 January – Two 10-year-olds go on trial, the youngest ever to be accused of rape.
- 19 February – Anthony Gormley's landmark sculpture, the Angel of the North, is erected at Gateshead.
- February - Middlesbrough Football Club launches 'Boro TV', becoming the first football club in the world to launch their own dedicated TV Channel
- 3 March – Millennium Dome construction begins.
- 6 March – Closure of South Crofty, the last tin mine in Cornwall.
- 2 April – Miles Evans, a 24-year-old former soldier, is sentenced to life imprisonment for the murder of his nine-year-old stepdaughter Zoe in Warminster last year. Shortly after her disappearance, he had appeared on television making an appeal for her safe return.
- 27 April – Kevin Lloyd, who has played Alfred "Tosh" Lines in The Bill since 1988, is dismissed from the role by ITV due to his alcoholism.
- 28 April – Donna Keogh disappears in Middlesbrough.
- 3 May – Arsenal secure the Premier League title with a 4–0 win over Everton.
- 9 May – Eurovision Song Contest held in Birmingham at the National Indoor Arena.
- 15 May – 24th G8 summit held in Birmingham.
- 16 May – Arsenal beat Newcastle United 2-0 in the FA Cup final to complete The double.
- June – Building work begins on Cambourne, a new village nine miles west of Cambridge. The first residents are expected to move into their homes next year.
- 15 June – The England national football team begin their World Cup campaign in France with a 2–0 win over Tunisia in Marseille, with goals coming from Alan Shearer and Paul Scholes.
- 22 June – England lose 2–1 to Romania in their second group game in Toulouse. Their consolation goal came from eighteen-year-old Michael Owen – who earlier this year became the youngest full England international of the 20th century.
- 23 June – The Heathrow Express begins operation.
- 26 June – England qualify for the next stage of the World Cup by beating Colombia 2-0 in Lens, with David Beckham scoring the first with a trademark 30 yard free kick, with Darren Anderton the 2nd.
- 30 June – England are out of the World Cup in the second round after losing on penalties to Argentina after a 2–2 draw in open play in Saint-Étienne. They were 2–1 up after 16 minutes thanks to goals from Alan Shearer and Michael Owen, but the Argentines later equalised and David Beckham was sent off in the second half for kicking the opponent who had fouled him.
- 2 July – Sion Jenkins, a 40-year-old deputy headmaster, is found guilty of the murder of Billie-Jo Jenkins, his 13-year-old foster daughter (the shared surname is a coincidence) and sentenced to life imprisonment. Billie-Jo was found dead at his home in Hastings, East Sussex, on 15 February last year.
- 31 July – Crime and Disorder Act receives Royal Assent. It introduces Anti-Social Behaviour Orders, Sex Offender Orders, Parenting Orders, and "racially aggravated" offences. It makes it possible for a young person between ten and fourteen to be presumed capable of committing an offence and formally abolishes capital punishment for treason and piracy, the last civilian offences for which the death penalty remained theoretically available.
- 10 August – Manchester United TV begins broadcasting, making Manchester United F.C. the world's second football team to have its own television channel.
- 24 August – First RFID human implantation tested in the United Kingdom by Kevin Warwick at the University of Reading.
- 9 September – An East London coroner records a verdict of suicide on former footballer Justin Fashanu, who was found hanged in a lock-up garage four months ago.
- November – Peugeot launches the 206 supermini, which is being built at the Ryton plant near Coventry.
- 5 November – Moors Murderer Myra Hindley loses a second High Court appeal (the first was rejected on 19 December 1997) against the Whole life tariff which has been imposed upon her by the three most recent Home Secretaries.
- 19 November – Regional Development Agencies Act establishes nine Regional development agencies across England.
- 10 December – John Pople wins the Nobel Prize in Chemistry "for his development of computational methods in quantum chemistry".
- 24 December – Silverdale colliery near Newcastle-Under-Lyme, Staffordshire, closes with the loss of more than 300 jobs, signalling the end of the North Staffordshire Coalfield after some 200 years.
- 26 December – Great Boxing Day Storm: Severe gale force winds hit Ireland, southern Scotland and northern England. Roads, railways and electricity are disrupted.

== See also ==
- 1998 in Northern Ireland
- 1998 in Scotland
- 1998 in Wales
