= Richard Taylor (skater) =

Welsh inline skater and freestyle skier (1981–2004)

Richard Taylor (6 July 1981 – 8 August 2004) was a Welsh inline skating and freestyle skiing champion.

Taylor, from Barry, Vale of Glamorgan, learned to skate because he wanted to become a stuntman. He turned professional at the age of 15 after winning the World Amateur International Inline Skate Series (IISS) and qualifying 6th in the Professional Competition in Amsterdam 1996. He went on to win the UK National In-Line skating championship twice. Taylor had a large fanbase, especially in Europe. He also competed in the British Freestyle Skiing and Snowboarding Championships in Les Deux Alpes in March 2004, winning the Big Air ski title and was about to join the Line Skis Professional Team that winter season.

== Death ==
He collided with a concrete lamp-post while skating near his home on 3 August 2004 and suffered a skull fracture that caused a coma. He also broke both legs in the accident. When he failed to regain consciousness, his parents on 8 August 2004 consented to his life support machine being turned off. His parents Gaynor and the now late John Taylor set up the Richard Taylor Memorial Fund to raise funds to have the skatepark at the Knap, Barry upgraded and dedicated to his memory, which was then opened in October of 2023.
