= Swansea City Opera =

Opera company founded in Swansea, Wales

The Swansea City Opera is a touring opera company founded in Swansea, Wales in May 2004. The company incorporates elements of Opera Box Limited, a touring opera company founded in 1989. Since its launch the opera has toured to 91 venues across the United Kingdom. The company places particular emphasis on touring within Wales, especially within Objective 1 and Communities First areas where performances are given at subsidised cost.

Swansea City Opera has fifty performers and performs its repertoire in three different versions depending on the size of the venue. In the smallest possible venues the number of performers reduces to fifteen. The Swansea City Opera's home venue is the Swansea Grand Theatre.

The company's repertoire has included:

- Cosi fan tutte,
- The Barber of Seville,
- The Pearl Fishers, and
- The Daughter of the Regiment by Donizetti.

The Swansea City Opera works in partnership with The Opera School Wales, a post-graduate training school based at the Adelina Patti Theatre, Powys, to train and develop young opera singers.
