= 2004–05 in Welsh football =

== Welsh Cup ==
Total Network Solutions beat Carmarthen Town 1–0 in the final of the Welsh Cup.

== Welsh League Cup ==
Carmarthen Town beat Rhyl 2–0 in the final of the Welsh League Cup.

== Welsh Premier League ==
- Champions: Total Network Solutions
- Relegated to Welsh Football League Division One: Afan Lido

== Welsh Football League Division One ==
- Champions: Ton Pentre - did not apply for promotion to Welsh Premier League therefore Cardiff Grange Quins promoted to Welsh Premier League

== Cymru Alliance League ==
- Champions: Buckley Town - did not apply for promotion to Welsh Premier League
