= Robin Llywelyn =

Robin Llywelyn (born 24 November 1958) is a Welsh novelist, writing in both Welsh and English. His works include From Empty Harbour to White Ocean, winner of the National Eisteddfod Prose Medal. He is also the managing director of Portmeirion Ltd which runs the Italianate village of Portmeirion built by his grandfather Sir Clough Williams-Ellis.

Llywelyn was born in Llanfrothen and was educated at University of Wales, Aberystwyth, where he studied Welsh and Irish. Llywelyn has written three novels in Welsh; Seren Wen ar Gefndir Gwyn (1992), which won the 1992 National Eisteddfod of Wales prose medal and the Arts Council of Wales Book of the Year Award; O'r Harbwr Gwag i'r Cefnfor Gwyn (1994), winner of the 1994 Eisteddfod of Wales Prose Medal and BBC Writer of the Year Award; and Un Diwrnod yn yr Eisteddfod (2004).
