= 2003–04 in Welsh football =

This article lists major events during the 2003–04 season in Welsh football.

== National team ==
Wales almost qualified for Euro 2004 in Portugal. They finished 2nd in a group that contained Italy, Serbia-Montenegro and Finland and made the play-offs. The Euro 2004 Qualifying play-offs pitted Wales with Russia. A 0–0 draw in a cold November evening in Moscow was followed by a 1–0 defeat in Cardiff.

== Welsh Cup ==
Rhyl beat Total Network Solutions 1–0 after extra time in the final of the Welsh Cup.

== Welsh League Cup ==
Rhyl beat Carmarthen Town 4–0 in the final of the Welsh League cup.

== Welsh Premier League ==
2003–04 saw Rhyl win the Welsh Premier League. TNS were about to win but a last day slip saw Rhyl claim the title.

Barry Town entered administration in the summer of 2003 having attained just 3 wins during a disastrous season and were relegated to the Welsh Football League Division One. All of their best players from the 2002–03 title winning season left and the amateur players who replaced them finished bottom of the league. The biggest win of the season in Wales was Caernarfon's 8–0 defeat of Barry Town on 30 August 2003.

== Welsh Football League Division One ==
- Champions: Llanelli – promoted to Welsh Premier League

== Cymru Alliance League ==
- Champions: Airbus UK – promoted to Welsh Premier League
