= 1997 in Scotland =

- Centuries: 18th; 19th; 20th; 21st
- Decades: 1970s; 1980s; 1990s; 2000s; 2010s
- See also: List of years in Scotland; Timeline of Scottish history 1997 in: The UK • England • Wales • Elsewhere; Scottish football: 1996–97 • 1997–98; 1997 in Scottish television

Events from the year 1997 in Scotland.

== Incumbents ==
- Secretary of State for Scotland and Keeper of the Great Seal – Michael Forsyth until 2 May; then Donald Dewar

=== Law officers ===
- Lord Advocate – Lord Mackay of Drumadoon; then Lord Hardie
- Solicitor General for Scotland – Paul Cullen; then Colin Boyd

=== Judiciary ===
- Lord President of the Court of Session and Lord Justice General – Lord Rodger of Earlsferry
- Lord Justice Clerk – Lord Ross, then Lord Cullen
- Chairman of the Scottish Land Court – Lord McGhie

== Events ==
- 22 February – Scientists at the Roslin Institute announce the birth of a cloned sheep named Dolly seven months afterwards.
- 31 March – Rail operator ScotRail (operated by National Express) begins operation of its passenger service franchise in Scotland as part of the privatisation of British Rail, the last company to be sold.
- April–October – In the Outer Hebrides, the Northern Lighthouse Board constructs a new light on Haskeir with minor lights on Gasker and on Shillay, Monach Islands.
- 1 May – The 1997 UK general glection results in all Conservative MPs in Scotland losing their seats, and Labour returning to government after eighteen years in opposition. 43-year-old, Edinburgh-born Tony Blair (Labour) becomes Prime Minister of the United Kingdom. Mohammad Sarwar, elected for Labour in Glasgow Govan, becomes the UK's first ever Muslim MP.
- 12 June – Isle of Eigg Heritage Trust acquires the island.
- 5 August – James Reid is jailed for life for the murder of four-year-old James Ward, whose skull was struck by so many blows with a slater's hammer that it was smashed into fragments, like a jigsaw.
- 7 September – Clyde Auditorium opened in Glasgow.
- 8 September – The football clubs in the Premier Division decide to split from the Scottish Football League and form the Scottish Premier League from next season.
- 11 September – referendum in Scotland on the creation of a Parliament with devolved powers takes place. Voters back the plans for a Scottish Executive with limited tax-raising powers.
- October – The Grand Theft Auto video game, developed by DMA Design in Dundee, is launched.
- 6 November – Labour holds the Paisley South by-election despite a swing of 11.3% to the Scottish National Party.
- 18 December – The bill to establish the Scottish Parliament unveiled by Secretary of State for Scotland Donald Dewar, who would become the inaugural First Minister of Scotland in 1999.
- December – Valhalla Brewery, the most northerly in Britain, opened on Unst.
- The Island of Stroma is completely devoid of permanent residents when its lighthouse is automated and its keepers and their families depart.
- Equality Network established to campaign for LGBT rights in Scotland.

== Births ==
- 17 January – Charithra Chandran, actress
- 6 May – Duncan Scott, swimmer
- 12 July – Fergus McCreadie, jazz pianist and composer
- 11 August – Sarah Clelland, footballer
- 3 October – Kathleen Dawson, swimmer
- 8 October – Josh Kerr, middle-distance runner

== Deaths ==
- 22 January – Billy Mackenzie, singer, by suicide (born 1957)
- 29 June – Marjorie Linklater, campaigner for the arts and environment of Orkney (born 1909)
- 4 September – Belle Stewart, traditional singer (born 1906)
- Angus McPhee, outsider artist (born 1916)

== The arts ==
- Wigtown and Dalmellington become book towns.
- Anne MacLeod publishes her first poetry collection, Standing by Thistles.

== See also ==
- 1997 in Northern Ireland
