= 2000 in Scotland =

- Centuries: 18th; 19th; 20th; 21st
- Decades: 1980s; 1990s; 2000s; 2010s; 2020s
- See also: List of years in Scotland; Timeline of Scottish history 2000 in: The UK • England • Wales • Elsewhere; Scottish football: 1999–2000 • 2000–01; 2000 in Scottish television

Events from the year 2000 in Scotland.

== Incumbents ==
- First Minister and Keeper of the Great Seal – Donald Dewar (until 11 October 2000), Henry McLeish (from 27 October 2000)
- Secretary of State for Scotland – John Reid

=== Law officers ===
- Lord Advocate –Lord Hardie; then Lord Boyd of Duncansby
- Solicitor General for Scotland – Colin Boyd; then Neil Davidson
- Advocate General for Scotland – Lynda Clark

=== Judiciary ===
- Lord President of the Court of Session and Lord Justice General – Lord Rodger of Earlsferry
- Lord Justice Clerk – Lord Cullen
- Chairman of the Scottish Land Court – Lord McGhie

== Events ==
- 11 January – a Scottish trawler, the Solway Harvester, sinks in the Irish Sea, killing seven crew.
- 14 January – The Crown Office and Procurator Fiscal Service formal requests Dutch authorities to extradite William Beggs back to Scotland. A warrant for the arrest of Beggs was issued by Strathclyde Police in December 1999 over the murder of Barry Wallace, an 18 year old from Kilmarnock who went missing after a night out with colleagues whose body parts were later discovered in Loch Lomond and Troon.
- 26 January – a tribunal grants the release of a school playground killer, Barbara Glover, who was ordered to be detained without limit of time for the 1991 murder of Diane Watson.
- 11 February – the Royal Bank of Scotland succeeds in the hostile takeover battle for its larger English rival, NatWest Bank, successfully defeating a rival offer by the Bank of Scotland.
- 29 February – Barry Wallace, the 18 year old from Kilmarnock who was mutilated and murdered by William Beggs, 36, in December 1999, is laid to rest at Grassyards Ceremony in Kilmarnock, 87 days after he was reported missing.
- 28 March – The extradition trial of William Beggs begins in the Netherlands.
- 7 April – the Union Canal reopens for leisure purposes from Linlithgow to Hermiston.
- 25 April – Dutch lawyers representing William Beggs submit an appeal to the Supreme Court of the Netherlands regarding his extradition back to Scotland.
- 29 April – at Murrayfield Stadium, the 2000 Challenge Cup tournament culminates in the Bradford Bulls' 24 – 18 win in the final against the Leeds Rhinos.
- May – the Scottish Parliament meets during this month in the former Strathclyde Regional Council debating chamber in Glasgow.
- 3 May – the Pan Am Flight 103 bombing trial opens at the Scottish Court in the Netherlands.
- 30 May – The Keep the Clause campaign funded by Brian Souter holds a referendum across Scotland to gauge public opinion on Section 28. 3,970,712 ballot papers were posted out and 31.8% valid votes were returned, a turnout rate lower than any Scottish national election. 86.8% were in favour of keeping Clause 28, 13.2% in favour of repeal.
- 9 June – the Abolition of Feudal Tenure etc. (Scotland) Act 2000 receives Royal Assent.
- 21 June – repeal of controversial Section 2B of the Local Government Act 1988 which prevented local authorities from "promoting homosexuality".
- 18 July – Alex Salmond resigns for the first time, as the Leader of the Scottish National Party. He would later return to the position of party leader in 2004.
- 4 August – Queen Elizabeth The Queen Mother celebrates her one-hundredth birthday in London.
- 10 August – 14 August – The first Commonwealth Youth Games take place in Edinburgh.
- 23 September – John Swinney wins the Scottish National Party leadership election, succeeding Alex Salmond as Leader of the Scottish National Party and becomes the second Leader of the Opposition.
- 26 September – The Supreme Court of the Netherlands rule that William Beggs should be extradited back to Scotland. The issue is later passed to the Dutch Government's justice minister for consideration.
- 26–27 October – Following the sudden death of Donald Dewar, Henry McLeish is nominated to serve as First Minister of Scotland by the Scottish Parliament, and is officially appointed by The Queen.
- 15 November – The Minister of Justice of the Netherlands, Benk Korthals and the Ministry of Justice and Security, confirms that William Beggs will be extradited back to Scotland.
- 21 November – Dennis Canavan MSP, resigns as MP for Falkirk West, triggering a by-election.
- 22 November – The legal team for William Beggs launches an appeal against the extradition trial of Beggs, claiming that the significant media coverage in Scotland will prevent Beggs from having a fair trial.
- 23 November – double by-election held in Glasgow Anniesland to elect successors to Donald Dewar's seats in both the UK Parliament and the Scottish Parliament. Labour holds both seats with swings to the SNP of 6% and 7%.
- 18 December – it is announced that Inverness has been awarded city status.
- 21 December – Falkirk West by-election results in Eric Joyce retaining the UK parliament seat for Labour, though with a majority reduced to just 705 votes in the face of a swing of 16.2% to the SNP.
- 22 December – American pop singer Madonna marries English-born film director Guy Ritchie at Skibo Castle, their son Rocco having been christened at Dornoch Cathedral the previous day.
- Islay LIMPET, the world's first commercial wave power device, is built.
- Sue Lawrence publishes Scots Cooking.

== Births ==
- 27 January - Euan Stainbank, Member of Parliament for Falkirk since 2024.
- 5 March – Jack Aitchison, footballer

== Deaths ==
- 2 February – Mary Docherty, Communist activist (born 1908)
- 4 March – Hermann Brück, astronomer (born 1905 in Germany)
- 1 April – Alexander Mackenzie Stuart, Baron Mackenzie-Stuart, Scottish lawyer and judge (born 1924)
- 27 May – Murray MacLehose, Baron MacLehose of Beoch, Governor of Hong Kong (born 1917)
- 11 October – Donald Dewar, politician, First Minister of Scotland (born 1937)
- 23 December – Jimmy Shand, accordionist and bandleader (born 1908)

== The arts ==
- 27 February – comedy drama television series Monarch of the Glen debuts on BBC One nationally.
- 22 March – radio situation comedy series Millport, written by and starring Lynn Ferguson, debuts on BBC Radio 4 nationally.
- James Robertson's novel The Fanatic is published.

== See also ==
- 2000 in England
- 2000 in Northern Ireland
- 2000 in Wales
