= 1996 in Scotland =

- Centuries: 18th; 19th; 20th; 21st
- Decades: 1970s; 1980s; 1990s; 2000s; 2010s
- See also: List of years in Scotland; Timeline of Scottish history 1996 in: The UK • England • Wales • Elsewhere; Scottish football: 1995–96 • 1996–97; 1996 in Scottish television

Events from the year 1996 in Scotland.

== Incumbents ==
- Secretary of State for Scotland and Keeper of the Great Seal – Michael Forsyth

=== Law officers ===
- Lord Advocate – Lord Mackay of Drumadoon
- Solicitor General for Scotland – Paul Cullen

=== Judiciary ===
- Lord President of the Court of Session and Lord Justice General – Lord Hope until 1 October; then Lord Rodger of Earlsferry
- Lord Justice Clerk – Lord Ross
- Chairman of the Scottish Land Court – Lord Philip, then Lord McGhie

== Events ==
- 13 March – Dunblane school massacre – a gunman kills sixteen children, their teacher and himself at a primary school in Dunblane, Stirling. The killer, who wounded thirteen other children and another teacher, is quickly identified as 43-year-old former scout leader Thomas Watt Hamilton.
- 1 April – The Local Government etc. (Scotland) Act 1994 takes effect with 32 unitary councils replacing the 9 Regional Councils, 53 District Councils and 3 unitary authorities that had been established under the Local Government (Scotland) Act 1973.
- 18 May – Rangers F.C., who have already won the Scottish Football League title, complete the Scottish double by beating Hearts 5–1 in the Scottish Cup final.
- 5 July – Dolly the sheep, the first mammal to have been successfully cloned from an adult cell, is born at The Roslin Institute in Midlothian.
- October – The Shetland Times and The Shetland News become involved in a landmark legal case over alleged copyright infringement and deep linking in their websites.
- 9 November – Irvine, North Ayrshire, is designated a New Town, the last of the five created in Scotland.
- 30 November (St. Andrew's Day) – The Stone of Scone is installed in Edinburgh Castle 700 years after it was removed from Scotland by King Edward I of England.
- Edinburgh Old Town and New Town become the first World Heritage Site in mainland Scotland.
- First of the Maggie's Centres for drop-in cancer care in the UK opens in Edinburgh.

== Births ==
- 13 January – Craig Storie, footballer
- 8 February – Jaison McGrath, footballer
- 1 March – Lizzie Arnot, footballer
- 15 March – Seonaid McIntosh, sport shooter
- 19 March – Kaiya Jones, actress
- 9 May – Grace Reid, diver
- 3 August – Robert MacIntyre, golfer
- 10 August – Lauren Tait, netball player
- 7 October – Lewis Capaldi, singer-songwriter

== Deaths ==
- 23 January – Norman MacCaig, poet (born 1910)
- 6 March – Stanley Booth-Clibborn, retired bishop of Manchester (born 1924 in London)
- 19 March – W. H. Murray, mountaineer and writer (born 1913)
- 13 April – George Mackay Brown, poet (born 1921)
- 14 April – David Brand, Lord Brand, advocate, sheriff and Senator of the College of Justice (born 1923)
- 25 April – John Lorne Campbell, folklorist (born 1906)
- 16 August – Eric Cullen, actor famous for playing "Wee Burnie" in Rab C. Nesbitt (born 1965)
- 25 August – Caroline Glachan, murder victim (born 1982 in Northern Ireland)
- 24 November – Sorley MacLean, poet (born 1911)

== The arts ==
- January – Indie pop band Belle and Sebastian is formed in Glasgow; on 6 June their debut album Tigermilk is released.
- James MacMillan's first opera Inés de Castro is premièred by Scottish Opera in Glasgow.
- Gallery of Modern Art in Glasgow opens.

== See also ==
- 1996 in Northern Ireland
