= 2001 in Scotland =

- Centuries: 19th; 20th; 21st
- Decades: 1980s; 1990s; 2000s; 2010s; 2020s
- See also: List of years in Scotland; Timeline of Scottish history 2001 in: The UK • England • Wales • Elsewhere; Scottish football: 2000–01 • 2001–02; 2001 in Scottish television

Events from the year 2001 in Scotland.

== Incumbents ==
- First Minister and Keeper of the Great Seal – Henry McLeish (until 8 November 2001), Jack McConnell (from 27 November 2001)
- Secretary of State for Scotland – John Reid until 25 January; then Helen Liddell

=== Law officers ===
- Lord Advocate – Lord Boyd of Duncansby
- Solicitor General for Scotland – Neil Davidson; then Elish Angiolini
- Advocate General for Scotland – Lynda Clark

=== Judiciary ===
- Lord President of the Court of Session and Lord Justice General – Lord Rodger of Earlsferry until 13 November; then Lord Cullen of Whitekirk
- Lord Justice Clerk – Lord Cullen, then Lord Gill
- Chairman of the Scottish Land Court – Lord McGhie

== Events ==
- 5 January – The International Court of Justice rule William Beggs, the main suspect in connection to the murder of Barry Wallace who went missing in December 1999 and whose body parts were later discovered in Loch Lomond and Troon, be extradited to Scotland to face trial in connection with the murder of Wallace.
- 9 January – William Beggs is extradited back to Scotland. He arrives at Edinburgh Airport and is arrested by Scottish police.
- 11 January – William Beggs appears at Kilmarnock Sheriff Court where he makes no plea or declaration in relation to the murder of Barry Wallace in December 1999.
- 31 January – the Scottish Court in the Netherlands convicts a Libyan and acquits another for their part in the bombing of Pan Am Flight 103 which crashed in Lockerbie in 1988. Lamin Khalifah Fhimah (aged 44) is cleared, but Abdelbaset al-Megrahi is found guilty and sentenced to life imprisonment (which will take place in Scotland) with a recommended minimum term of twenty years. Megrahi was released from prison on compassionate grounds in 2009; as doctors reported he had terminal prostate cancer, and he died on 20 May 2012, aged sixty.
- March – first natural gas production from the Elgin–Franklin fields in the North Sea.
- 5 April – First Minister of Scotland, Henry McLeish, meets with President of the United States, George W. Bush in the Oval Office at the White House.
- 26 May – the Forth and Clyde Canal reopens throughout for leisure purposes (12 June officially).
- 7 June – The UK general election results in the Labour Party winning 56 of Scotland's 72 seats, with the Liberal Democrats winning ten, the Scottish National Party winning five and the Conservatives gaining one.
- 17 June – Cardinal Winning, head of the Roman Catholic church in Scotland, dies of a heart attack aged 76.
- 21 June – Glasgow Science Centre opens to visitors.
- 24 June – suicide of Nicola Ann Raphael in Glasgow following bullying. She was fifteen years old.
- 14 July – Eriskay is linked to South Uist by causeway.
- 10 September – the Bank of Scotland and the Halifax merge to form HBOS plc.
- 13 September – First minister Henry McLeish moves a motion in the Scottish Parliament in the wake of the September 11 attacks in the United States. McLeish states "the Parliament condemns the senseless and abhorrent acts of terrorism carried out".
- 18 September – The trial of William Beggs begins at the High Court of Justiciary in Edinburgh in connection with the murder of Barry Wallace in December 1999.
- October
  - Date unknown – Glasgow Tower first opens to public.
  - 12 October – William Beggs, the man accused of the mutilation and murder of Barry Wallace in 1999, is sentenced at the High Court of Justiciary in Edinburgh and imprisoned for life. He is convicted of handcuffing, injuring, sexually assaulting and murdering Barry Wallace before dismembering his body in December 1999.
- 6 November – the Protection from Abuse (Scotland) Act 2001 receives Royal Assent.
- 13 December – New Lanark is designated as a World Heritage Site.
- 23 December – the Cairngorm Mountain Railway opens.
- 26 December – English-born author J. K. Rowling marries at the country house of Killiechassie which she purchased a month earlier.
- Full date unknown:
  - Wilderness Scotland tour operator is founded.

== Births ==
- 17 May – Anna Shackley, cyclist

== Deaths ==
- 27 January – Robert Alexander Rankin, mathematician (born 1915)
- 1 February – Jack Milroy, comedian and one half of Francie and Josie (born 1915)
- 12 June – Thomas Wilson, classical composer (born 1927 in the United States)
- 31 October – Angus MacVicar, writer (born 1908)
- 15 November – Megan Boyd, fly tyer (born 1915 in England)

== The arts ==
- Summer – Channel Six Dundee, a restricted television service licence station, begins its one-year operation.
- Anne Donovan's collection Hieroglyphics and Other Stories is published.
- Pop rock group Speedway formed by Glaswegians Jill Jackson (vocals) and Jim Duguid (drums).

== See also ==
- 2001 in England
- 2001 in Northern Ireland
- 2001 in Wales
