= 2002 in Scotland =

- Centuries: 19th; 20th; 21st
- Decades: 1980s; 1990s; 2000s; 2010s; 2020s
- See also: List of years in Scotland; Timeline of Scottish history 2002 in: The UK • England • Wales • Elsewhere; Scottish football: 2001–02 • 2002–03; 2002 in Scottish television

Events from the year 2002 in Scotland.

== Incumbents ==
- First Minister and Keeper of the Great Seal – Jack McConnell
- Secretary of State for Scotland – Helen Liddell

=== Law officers ===
- Lord Advocate – Lord Boyd of Duncansby
- Solicitor General for Scotland – Elish Angiolini
- Advocate General for Scotland – Lynda Clark

=== Judiciary ===
- Lord President of the Court of Session and Lord Justice General – Lord Cullen of Whitekirk
- Lord Justice Clerk – Lord Gill
- Chairman of the Scottish Land Court – Lord McGhie

== Events ==
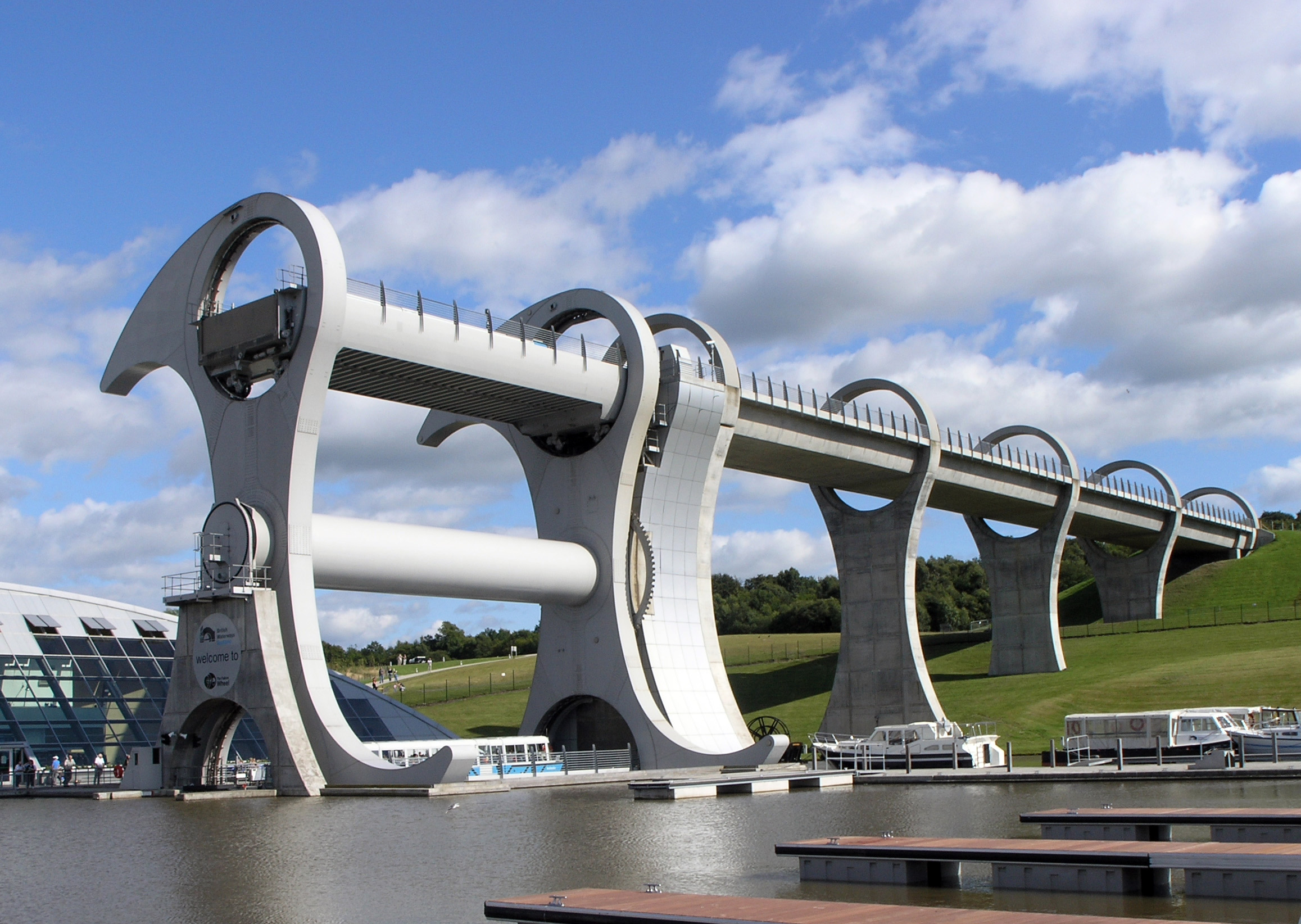
Falkirk Wheel

- February – 2002 Winter Olympics: the gold medal in women's curling is won by an all-Scottish team representing Great Britain in Salt Lake City skipped by Rhona Martin.
- 14 March – Stirling is granted city status in the United Kingdom by Queen Elizabeth II to mark her Golden Jubilee.
- 10 February – The hit preschool television series Balamory made by BBC Scotland is first broadcast.
- 14 March – appeal of Abdelbaset al-Megrahi against a conviction for murder in connection with the 1988 bombing of Pan Am Flight 103 over Lockerbie is rejected and the Scottish Court in the Netherlands is decommissioned.
- 19 March – A lesbian couple are granted parental rights over their children by an Edinburgh court.
- 29 March – Coal mining in Scotland, which has a history stretching back more than 800 years, comes to an end with the closure of Longannet coal mine in Fife after its owners go into liquidation following flooding, putting more than 500 people out of work.
- 1 May – Airdrieonians, of the Scottish Football League Division One, go into liquidation with debts of £3,000,000.
- 7 May – Prime Minister Tony Blair unveils a statue of Donald Dewar on Buchanan Street in Glasgow city centre.
- May – The Scottish Parliament meets during this month in the University of Aberdeen.
- 24 May – Falkirk Wheel boat lift opens in Scotland, also marking reopening of the Union Canal for leisure traffic.
- 28 May – The Freedom of Information (Scotland) Act 2002 receives royal assent.
- 9 July – Clydebank F.C. of the Scottish Football League Second Division become defunct after a takeover by the owners of the new Airdrie United club, who take their place in the Scottish league.
- 24 July – Loch Lomond and The Trossachs National Park created, Scotland's first national park.
- 30 July – 2002 Glasgow floods result from heavy rain overnight.
- 1 August – The Protection of Wild Mammals (Scotland) Act 2002, that bans traditional fox hunting and hare coursing, comes into effect. A similar ban would take place in England and Wales under the Hunting Act 2004, which took effect from 18 February 2005.
- Millennium Bridge, Glasgow, opens to pedestrians.

== Deaths ==
- 8 March – Hamish Henderson, folk song collector (born 1919)
- 30 March – Queen Elizabeth The Queen Mother dies aged 101 at Royal Lodge, Windsor.
- 27 May – Marjorie Ogilvie Anderson, historian and palaeographer (born 1909)
- 5 July – Jannette Anderson, academic (born 1927)
- 19 September – Rosalind Mitchison, historian (born 1919)
- October – William Dysart, actor (born 1929)
- 9 November – Neil MacCallum, political activist and poet (born 1954)
- 10 December – Ian MacNaughton, Scottish actor, director, and producer (born 1925)

== The arts ==
- 24 September – soap opera River City is first broadcast on BBC One Scotland.
- The office of Edinburgh Makar is instituted, with poet Stewart Conn as first incumbent.
- The indie rock band Franz Ferdinand is formed in Glasgow.
- David Greig's play Outlying Islands is premiered at the Traverse Theatre during the Edinburgh Festival Fringe.
- Peter Maxwell Davies composes his Piano Trio: A Voyage to Fair Isle.

== See also ==
- 2002 in England
- 2002 in Northern Ireland
- 2002 in Wales
