= List of lords of appeal =

This is a list of the last Lords of Appeal in Ordinary and other Lords of Appeal before the judicial functions of the House of Lords ended in 2009.

== Last Lords of Appeal in Ordinary ==
As of 30 September 2009, (the day before their functions were transferred to the Supreme Court of the United Kingdom), the Lords of Appeal in Ordinary appointed under section 6 of the Appellate Jurisdiction Act 1876 were, in order of seniority:

Law Lord	Served from	Served until	Mandatory retirement	Death	Prior senior judicial roles
The Lord Phillips of Worth Matravers (Senior Lord)	12 January 1999	30 September 2012	21 January 2013		Lord Chief Justice of England and Wales (2005–2008); Master of the Rolls (2000–2005); Lord of Appeal in Ordinary (1999–2000); Lord Justice of Appeal (E&W) (1995–1999); Justice of the High Court, QBD (1987–1995)
The Lord Hope of Craighead (Second Senior Lord)	1 October 1996	26 June 2013	27 June 2013		Senator of the College of Justice: (1989–1996)
The Lord Saville of Newdigate	28 July 1997	30 September 2010	20 March 2011		Lord Justice of Appeal (E&W) (1994–1997); Justice of the High Court, QBD (1985–1993)
The Lord Scott of Foscote	17 July 2000	30 September 2009	2 October 2009		Vice Chancellor of the High Court (1994–2000); Lord Justice of Appeal (E&W) (1991–1994); Justice of the High Court, CD (1983–1991)
The Lord Rodger of Earlsferry	1 October 2001	26 June 2011	18 September 2019	26 June 2011	Senator of the College of Justice: (1995–2001)
The Lord Walker of Gestingthorpe	1 October 2002	17 March 2013	17 March 2013	16 November 2023	Lord Justice of Appeal (E&W) (1997–2002); Justice of the High Court, CD (1984–1997)
The Baroness Hale of Richmond	12 January 2004	11 January 2020	31 January 2020		Lord Justice of Appeal (E&W) (1999–2003); Justice of the High Court, FD (1994–1999)
The Lord Brown of Eaton-under-Heywood	13 January 2004	9 April 2012	9 April 2012	7 July 2023	Lord Justice of Appeal (E&W) (1992–2004); Justice of the High Court, QBD (1984–1992)
The Lord Mance	3 October 2005	6 June 2018	6 June 2018		Lord Justice of Appeal (E&W) (1999–2005); Justice of the High Court, QBD (1993–1999)
The Lord Neuberger of Abbotsbury	11 January 2007	4 September 2017	10 January 2018		Lord Justice of Appeal (E&W) (2004–2007); Justice of the High Court, CD (1996–1997)
The Lord Collins of Mapesbury	20 April 2009	7 May 2011	7 May 2011		Lord Justice of Appeal (E&W) (2004–2007); Justice of the High Court, CD (1996–1997)
The Lord Kerr of Tonaghmore	29 June 2009	30 September 2020	22 February 2023	1 December 2020	Lord Chief Justice of Northern Ireland (2004–2009); Justice of the High Court (NI) (1993–2003)

== Last Lords of Appeal ==
As of 30 September 2009, the other Lords of Appeal who were, by virtue of sections 5 & 25 of the Appellate Jurisdiction Act 1876, eligible to form the quorum (3) of the House of Lords necessary to hear and determine judicial business were:

- The date in parentheses is the date after which the Lord of Appeal is disqualified from participating in judicial business. The date is set by the Judicial Pensions and Retirement Act 1993.

Eligible Lords

Lord Chancellor	Served from	Served until	Mandatory retirement	Death	Prior senior judicial roles
The Lord Mackay of Clashfern	28 October 1987	2 May 1997	2 July 2002		
The Lord Irvine of Lairg	2 May 1997	12 June 2003	23 June 2015		None
The Lord Falconer of Thoroton	12 June 2003	27 June 2007	19 November 2026		None
Law Lord	Served from	Served until	Mandatory retirement	Death	Prior senior judicial roles
The Lord Goff of Chieveley (Senior Lord)	6 February 1986	30 September 1998	12 November 2001	14 August 2016	Lord Justice of Appeal (E&W) (1982–1986); Justice of the High Court, QBD (1975–1982)
The Lord Browne-Wilkinson (Senior Lord)	1 October 1991	5 June 2000	30 March 2005	25 July 2018	Vice Chancellor of the High Court (1985–1991); Lord Justice of Appeal (E&W) (1983–1985); Justice of the High Court, CD (1977–1983)
The Lord Bingham of Cornhill (Senior Lord)	6 June 2000	30 September 2008	13 October 2008	11 September 2010	Lord Chief Justice of England and Wales (1996–2000); Master of the Rolls (1992–1996); Lord Justice of Appeal (E&W) (1986–1992); Justice of the High Court, QBD (1980–1986)
The Lord Templeman	30 September 1982	30 September 1994	3 March 1995	4 June 2014	Lord Justice of Appeal (E&W) (1978–1982); Justice of the High Court, CD (1972–1978)
The Lord Griffiths	23 May 1985	30 September 1993	26 September 1998	30 May 2015	Lord Justice of Appeal (E&W) (1980–1985); Justice of the High Court, QBD (1971–1980)
The Lord Mustill	10 January 1992	21 March 1997	10 May 2006	24 April 2015	Lord Justice of Appeal (E&W) (1985–1992); Justice of the High Court, QBD (1978–1985)
The Lord Woolf	1 October 1992	4 June 1996	2 May 2008		Lord Chief Justice of England and Wales (2000–2005); Master of the Rolls (1996–2000); Lord of Appeal in Ordinary (1992–1996); Lord Justice of Appeal (E&W) (1986–1992); Justice of the High Court, QBD (1979–1986)
The Lord Lloyd of Berwick	1 October 1993	31 December 1998	9 May 2004	8 December 2024	Lord Justice of Appeal (E&W) (1984–1993); Justice of the High Court, QBD (1978–1983)
The Lord Nicholls of Birkenhead	3 October 1994	10 January 2007	25 January 2008	25 September 2019	Vice Chancellor of the High Court (1991–1994); Lord Justice of Appeal (E&W) (1986–1991); Justice of the High Court, CD (1983–1986)
The Lord Steyn	11 January 1995	1 October 2005	15 August 2007	28 November 2017	Lord Justice of Appeal (E&W) (1992–1995); Justice of the High Court, QBD (1985–1992)
The Lord Hoffmann	21 February 1995	21 April 2009	8 May 2009		Lord Justice of Appeal (E&W) (1992–1995); Justice of the High Court, CD (1985–1992)
The Lord Hutton	6 January 1997	11 January 2004	29 June 2007	14 July 2020	Lord Chief Justice of Northern Ireland (1989–1997); Justice of the High Court (NI) (1979–1989)
The Lord Millett	1 October 1998	11 January 2004	23 June 2007	27 May 2021	Lord Justice of Appeal (E&W) (1994–1998); Justice of the High Court, CD (1986–1994)
The Lord Carswell	12 January 2004	28 June 2009	28 June 2009	4 May 2023	Lord Chief Justice of Northern Ireland (1997–2004); Lord Justice of Appeal (NI) (1992–1997); Justice of the High Court (NI) (1984–1992)
England and Wales	Served from	Served until	Mandatory retirement	Death	Prior senior judicial roles
The Lord Clarke of Stone-cum-Ebony	3 October 2005	30 September 2009	13 May 2018		Master of the Rolls (2005–2009); Lord Justice of Appeal (E&W) (1998–2005); Justice of the High Court, QBD (1993–1998)
The Lady Butler-Sloss	13 June 2006	10 August 2008	10 August 2008		President of the Family Division (1999–2005); Lord Justice of Appeal (E&W) (1988–1999); Justice of the High Court, CD (1979–1988)
The Lord Judge	1 October 2008	30 September 2013	19 May 2016	7 November 2023	Lord Chief Justice of England and Wales (2008–2013); President of the Queen's Bench Division (2005–2008); Deputy Chief Justice of England and Wales (2003–2005); Senior Presiding Judge for England and Wales (1998–2003); Lord Justice of Appeal (E&W) (1996–1999); Justice of the High Court, QBD (1988–1996)
Scotland	Served from	Served until	Mandatory retirement	Death	Prior senior judicial roles
The Lord McCluskey	29 September 1976	12 June 2004	12 June 2004	20 July 2017	Senator of the College of Justice: (1984–2000)
The Lord Cameron of Lochbroom	13 June 1984	13 June 2006	13 June 2006	28 January 2025	Senator of the College of Justice: (1989–2003)
The Lord Mackay of Drumadoon	13 December 1995	30 September 2009	30 January 2016	21 August 2018	Senator of the College of Justice: (2000–2013)
The Lord Hardie	21 May 1997	30 September 2009	8 January 2016		Senator of the College of Justice: (2000–2012)
The Lord Cullen of Whitekirk	17 June 2003	30 September 2009	18 November 2010		Senator of the College of Justice: (1986–2005)
The Baroness Clark of Calton	21 June 2005	30 September 2009	26 February 2019		Senator of the College of Justice: (2006–2019)

== See also ==
- Judicial functions of the House of Lords
