= 2000 in Scottish television =

This is a list of events in Scottish television from 2000.

== Events ==
=== February ===
- 28 February – Having decided not to adopt the 1999 ITV generic look, Scottish and Grampian launch a new on-screen logo.

=== April ===
- Capital Radio buys Border Television.

=== Unknown ===
- ITV's Gaelic news bulletin Telefios is axed.

== Debuts ==
=== BBC ===
- 27 February – Monarch of the Glen on BBC One (2000–2005)
- 7 August – Tinsel Town on BBC Two (2000–2001)

=== ITV ===
- 5 January – Meeow! on Scottish Television (2000–2003)
- 11 May – Harry and the Wrinklies on Scottish Television (2000–2002)
- August – Inside Out on Scottish Television (2000)

== Television series ==
- Scotsport (1957–2008)
- Reporting Scotland (1968–1983; 1984–present)
- Scotland Today (1972–2009)
- Sportscene (1975–present)
- The Beechgrove Garden (1978–present)
- Grampian Today (1980–2009)
- High Road (1980–2003)
- Taggart (1983–2010)
- Crossfire (1984–2004)
- Wheel of Fortune (1988–2001)
- Win, Lose or Draw (1990–2004)
- Only an Excuse? (1993–2020)
- Chewin' the Fat (1999–2002)
- Harry and the Wrinklies (1999–2002)

== Ending this year ==
- December – Inside Out (2000)
- Unknown – Telefios (1993–2000)

== See also ==
- 2000 in Scotland
