= Cullen Inquiry =

Lord Cullen has conducted inquiries into three major British disasters, all of which are known as the Cullen Inquiry:

- The Piper Alpha oil platform disaster, 6 July 1988.
- The Dunblane Massacre of schoolchildren, 13 March 1996.
- The Ladbroke Grove rail crash, west London of 5 October 1999.
