= Justice Dawson =

Justice Dawson may refer to:

- Daryl Dawson (born 1933), justice of the High Court of Australia
- John Shaw Dawson (1869–1960), justice of the Kansas Supreme Court

== See also ==
- Thomas Dawson, Lord Dawson (died 2007), judge of the Supreme Court of Scotland
- Judge Dawson (disambiguation)
