= Alan Mackay =

Alan Mackay may refer to:

- Alan Lindsay Mackay (1926–2025), British crystallographer
- Alan Mackay (reporter), Scottish television news reporter for the BBC
- Alan Mackay (footballer) (born 1943), Scottish footballer for Third Lanark, Motherwell, Dumbarton
