= Shirley McKie =

Scottish police detective

Detective Constable Shirley McKie (born August 1962) is a former Scottish police detective who was accused by fingerprint analysis staff of the Scottish Criminal Record Office (SCRO) of leaving her thumb print on the bathroom door frame of a murder crime-scene in Kilmarnock on 14 January 1997. McKie denied she had ever been in the house of murder victim Marion Ross, but she was initially suspended, then sacked, then arrested by Strathclyde Police in 1998, and tried and acquitted in 1999. A scandal subsequently developed because of allegations of misconduct on the part of the SCRO and the police.

With continuing public concern over what became known as the "Shirley McKie fingerprint scandal", Scottish Justice Secretary Kenny MacAskill announced in March 2008, that a public inquiry into the case would begin in September of that year (see Fingerprint Inquiry).

== Case in brief ==
On 8 January 1997, the body of Marion Ross was found in her home in Kilmarnock. She had been stabbed multiple times. David Asbury, a handyman who had once worked on the Ross house, became a suspect. A fingerprint found on a tin box in his home was reported to be that of Marion Ross by examiners at the Scottish Criminal Records Office. The SCRO also reported they had identified a fingerprint found on a Christmas present gift tag inside the Ross home as that of Asbury. While checking other, unidentified fingerprints from the victim's home, examiners reported one of those prints to have been identified as that of McKie. During Asbury's murder trial, at which he was found guilty, McKie testified that she had not been inside the home and could not have left her fingerprint there.

Because Marion Ross was known to hoard possessions, making it possible for Asbury to have left a print on the gift tag years earlier while he was working at the home, the print on the tin box in Asbury's home became the key piece of evidence in the case against him. McKie's testimony at Asbury's trial that she could not have left a print inside the Ross home implied, if true, that the SCRO examiners were capable of error in a fingerprint comparison. David Asbury was subsequently freed from a life sentence due to questions raised about the identification of the print on the tin box.

== Exonerated of perjury charge ==
In March 1998, DC McKie was arrested and charged with perjury. However, in May 1999, the Scottish jury at the High Court of Justiciary rejected the SCRO's fingerprint evidence and McKie was unanimously found not guilty of perjury. U.S. fingerprint experts Pat Wertheim and David Grieve and the dutch forencic Arie Zeelenberg testified during McKie's trial that the fingerprint inside the Ross house was not McKie's.

== Compensation suits and payment ==
McKie sued her employers regarding the manner in which she was arrested. She lost the case against Strathclyde Police in February 2003 and faced a legal bill of £13,000. McKie faced bankruptcy as a result, but an anonymous donor paid the legal bill in June 2004, and McKie was reported to be "absolutely overjoyed". A second civil action was then raised suing the Scottish Executive amongst others on the basis that a malicious prosecution had been caused by dishonesty of the SCRO fingerprint experts. On the morning that this was to be heard, in February 2006, McKie was offered and accepted £750,000 from the Scottish Executive in full settlement of her compensation claim, without admission of liability. The case was then dropped. At an earlier stage of the case against the Scottish Executive the Lord Advocate Colin Boyd argued that expert witnesses should always be immune from prosecution – even if they gave false evidence.

== Parliamentary inquiry ==
The Scottish parliament decided to refer the McKie case to its Justice 1 Committee whose inquiry began in April 2006 and took evidence from more than 30 witnesses. Ms McKie, accompanied by her father Iain and a team of legal advisers, appeared before the committee of MSPs on 23 May 2006. Her accusers – the four SCRO fingerprint officers Hugh Macpherson, Fiona McBride, Anthony McKenna and Charles Stewart – appeared a week later on 30 May 2006. The Justice 1 Committee proceeded to request the Scottish Executive to provide it with four McKie case reports:

- the Mackay report
- two reports by fingerprint expert, John MacLeod
- the report by independent expert, Michael Pass

Although the Lord Advocate, Colin Boyd, responded by refusing to release the Mackay report for reasons relating to "fundamental principles of our democracy, including the presumption of innocence", Justice minister Cathy Jamieson agreed to release to MSPs reports by John MacLeod and Michael Pass. Despite Boyd's refusal, a leaked copy of Mackay's 56-page report was published by the BBC.

In September 2006, the four fingerprint officers were reported to have been offered a deal by the SCRO to resign or take early retirement. Their union, Unison, criticised the timing of the offer (before the Justice 1 Committee had reported) and argued that the SCRO officers were being "harassed".

The report of the Justice 1 committee of the Scottish parliament published its 230-page report on 15 February 2007 (pages 189-190 deal specifically with Ms McKie's out-of-court settlement).

== Public inquiry ==
Following the out-of-court settlement, Opposition parties in the Scottish parliament called for a public inquiry to be held into the McKie case. In March 2006, Shirley McKie's father, Iain, and Dr Jim Swire, father of Lockerbie bombing victim Flora, met to launch a campaign for a judicial inquiry which they hoped would investigate recent revelations of a link between the McKie case and the Pan Am Flight 103 bombing trial. After the meeting, Dr Swire said:

"The reputation of our country and its criminal justice system will depend upon how these cases are sorted out."

However, the Scottish Executive ruled out any question of a judicial inquiry (which has the power to compel the attendance of witnesses) whilst Shirley McKie and her family announced their campaign for a public inquiry would end on 9 January 2007 – exactly ten years after the Marion Ross murder investigation began:

"We have given ten years of our lives to this and we are not giving any more. It is the politicians' job now to do something about it," said her father, Iain McKie. "It is not our role to fight for justice: it is their role."

In March 2008 it was announced that a public inquiry would be held. In October 2008 a public inquiry into the case was opened in Glasgow, led by former Northern Ireland judge Sir Anthony Campbell. A procedural hearing was scheduled for 21 November 2008 and proceedings started in June 2009.

=== Inquiry proceedings ===
Sir Anthony Campbell opened the inquiry proceedings at 10.30 am on Tuesday 2 June 2009 in Maryhill Community Central Hall, Glasgow. Following Sir Anthony's introductory statement, senior counsel to the inquiry Gerry Moynihan QC made a public presentation of all the material that has been collected. Thereafter, lawyers for the core participants are expected to make their opening statements. The hearing of oral evidence was scheduled to commence at 10.15 am on Tuesday 9 June.

Following the hearing of evidence at the Inquiry during 2009 the Chairman Sir Anthony Campbell published his report on 14 December 2011 in Glasgow.

A full copy of this report can be obtained online at the Fingerprint Inquiry homepage.

== Protest song ==
Scottish folk singer and poet Michael Marra has written a protest song condemning the way the McKie case was handled. The lyrics include: "I am Shirley McKie. She is me and I am she. You are too, Shirley is you. We are she because Shirley is we." And referring to first minister Jack McConnell, they say, "We lecture children if they're telling lies, they will not prosper and they will not thrive... And even the First Minister must sometimes stand naked."

== Publications ==
Shirley McKie: The Price of Innocence by Iain McKie and Michael Russell MSP, published 18 April 2007, ISBN 978-1-84158-575-8.

== See also ==
- Brandon Mayfield, misidentified fingerprint
- New York State Police Troop C scandal, fabricated crime scene fingerprints
