= Drury v HM Advocate =

- Court: High Court of Justiciary
- Decided: 2 February 2001
- Citation: 2001 SLT 1013; 2001 SCCR 583; 2001 GWD 26-1027

Court membership
- Judges sitting: Lord Justice General Lord Rodger, Lords Cameron of Lochbroom, Johnston, Nimmo Smith and Mackay of Drumadoon

Drury v. Her Majesty's Advocate is a Scottish criminal case heard before a full bench (five judges) of the High Court of Justiciary sitting as the Court of Criminal Appeal. Stuart Drury had been convicted of killing his former partner with a hammer on concluding that she had begun a new relationship with another man. The original trial judge directed the jury that a finding of culpable homicide could only be made where the accused had not intended to kill and had not displayed enough wicked recklessness to convict of murder, and that a defence of provocation was only possible if the violence was proportionate to the provocation itself.

In the Court of Criminal Appeal's judgement, the Lord Justice General, Lord Rodger, sought to clarify what he considered to be an incomplete standard definition of murder:

[M]urder is constituted by any wilful act causing the destruction of life, by which the perpetrator either wickedly intends to kill or displays wicked recklessness as to whether the victim lives or dies.

This was a controversial opinion, as it made murder a more difficult charge to prove. Normally, when prosecuting, the Crown seeks to establish the appropriate actus reus, mens rea, and lack of any defences; however, Drury suggests that the mens rea of murder is "wicked recklessness", where wicked means there is no defence. This means that, if a defence exists, there is no mens rea. The effect of this is that, if the accused successfully pleads provocation or diminished responsibility, his conviction is reduced from murder to culpable homicide.

This conflicts with the principle that a defence may be based on a mistaken belief by the accused (e.g. the belief he was being attacked), but that the belief must be reasonable (Owens v HMA). Drury cannot be reconciled with this idea because holding an unreasonable belief may be "reckless" but it is not "wicked".
