= Judge Dawson =

Judge Dawson may refer to:

- Archie Owen Dawson (1898–1964), judge of the United States District Court for the Southern District of New York
- Charles I. Dawson (1881–1969), judge of the United States District Court for the Western District of Kentucky
- Howard Dawson (1922–2016), judge of the United States Tax Court
- Joseph Dawson III (born 1970), judge of the United States District Court for the District of South Carolina
- Kent Dawson (born 1944), judge of the United States District Court for the District of Nevada
- Robert T. Dawson (born 1938), judge of the United States District Court for the Western District of Arkansas
- Thomas Dawson, Lord Dawson (died 2007), judge of the Supreme Court of Scotland

== See also ==
- Justice Dawson (disambiguation)
