= Paul Cullen, Lord Pentland =

Scottish judge (born 1957)

The Right Honourable Lord Pentland PC
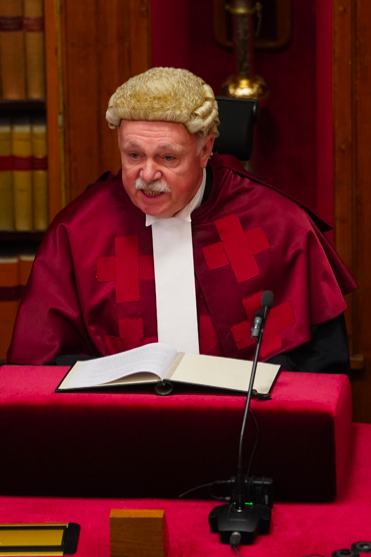
- Lord Pentland in 2025

Lord President of the Court of Session Lord Justice General of Scotland
- Incumbent
- Assumed office 3 February 2025
- Nominated by: John Swinney; As First Minister
- Appointed by: Charles III
- Deputy: Lord Beckett
- Preceded by: Lord Carloway

Senator of the College of Justice
- Incumbent
- Assumed office 5 November 2008
- Nominated by: Alex Salmond; As First Minister
- Appointed by: Elizabeth II
- Preceded by: Lord Macfadyen

Solicitor General for Scotland
- In office 7 November 1995 – 2 May 1997
- Prime Minister: John Major
- Preceded by: Donald Mackay
- Succeeded by: Colin Boyd

Personal details
- Born: Paul Benedict Cullen; 11 March 1957 (age 69) Gosforth, England
- Spouse: Joyce Nicol (m. 1983)
- Children: Stuart (1989), Richard (1992), Lindsey (1994)
- Education: University of Edinburgh
- Profession: Advocate
- Website: Scottish Courts Service

Paul Benedict Cullen, Lord Pentland, PC (born 11 March 1957) is the current Lord President of the Court of Session and Lord Justice General, the most senior judge in Scotland. He is a former Solicitor General for Scotland, Senator of the College of Justice and Chairman of the Scottish Law Commission.

== Early life ==
Born in Gosforth, Northumberland, he was educated at St Augustine's High School, Edinburgh and at the School of Law of the University of Edinburgh.

== Legal career ==
=== Department of Environment ===
Cullen was admitted to the Faculty of Advocates in 1982, devilling for Alan Rodger QC. He tutored part-time at the Faculty of Law at the University of Edinburgh from 1982 to 1986, when he was elected Clerk of the Faculty of Advocates, serving until 1991. He was Standing Junior Counsel to the Department of the Environment in Scotland from 1988 to 1991 and appointed an Advocate Depute in 1992, becoming a Queen's Counsel in 1995. A member of the Conservative Party, he became Solicitor General for Scotland, the junior Law Officer in Scotland, in 1995, when Donald Mackay succeeded Lord Rodger of Earlsferry as Lord Advocate, the senior Law Officer. He held this post until the Labour election victory in 1997, when he was succeeded by Colin Boyd, who later became Lord Advocate.

=== Gilmerton enquiry ===
He was the chairman of the public inquiry into the Gilmerton Limestone Emergency in 2001–2002, and has been Chairman of the Appeal Committee of the Institute of Chartered Accountants of Scotland and of the Police Appeals Tribunal. In 2003, The Scotsman named him the seventieth highest earner in Scotland, and third highest earner at the Bar, after Richard Keen QC (who was sixty-first with earnings of £600,000 and a former dean of the Faculty) and Michael Jones, Lord Jones (who was fifty-fifth with earnings of £750,000). He was involved in a number of high-profile cases, including the Countryside Alliance challenge to the Scottish fox-hunting ban, judicial review connected to the Stockline Plastics factory explosion, and the first two appeals to the Inner House of the Court of Session under the Freedom of Information (Scotland) Act 2002 and the first such appeal to the House of Lords.

=== Senator of College of Justice ===
In November 2008, Cullen was appointed as a Senator of the College of Justice, a judge of the High Court of Justiciary and Court of Session, the Supreme Courts of Scotland, and took the judicial title, Lord Pentland. In 2010 he was appointed as a member of the Upper Tribunal (Tax and Chancery Chamber). He has also served as an Intellectual Property judge.

Lord Pentland was appointed as Chairman of the Scottish Law Commission on 1 January 2014 for a period of five years until 31 December 2018. He was appointed to the First Division of the Inner House of the Court of Session in July 2020, and to the Privy Council in September 2020.

=== Lord President of Court of Session ===
On 9 January 2025, it was announced that Lord Pentland had been appointed as the next Lord President of the Court of Session and Lord Justice General. He succeeded Lord Carloway on 3 February 2025.

On 17 October 2025, Lord Pentland celebrated the tenth anniversary of the creation of the Sheriff Appeal Court alongside Lord Carloway, Lord Gill and Sheriff Principal Anwar.

The Regulation of Legal Services (Scotland) Act 2025 gave ultimate control and supervision of the Scottish legal profession to the Lord President. On 16 December 2025, consideration of possible detailed approaches was placed in the hands of Lord Ericht, appointed as Regulatory Judge.

== Political career ==
Cullen contested the Eastwood constituency at the 1997 general election for the Conservative Party, but finished in second place to Jim Murphy of the Labour Party. All Conservative Party representation was wiped out from Scottish constituencies at that election. Cullen served as Vice-President of the Edinburgh South Conservative Association from 1997 until he took the bench in 2008. He represented the Scottish Conservative Party on the Consultative Steering Group in 1998-99 which helped prepare procedures for the new Scottish Parliament. He was appointed Chairman of the Disciplinary Panel of the Scottish Conservatives in 2000.

== Personal life ==
Cullen is married to Joyce Nicol, former Chair of Brodies LLP (1983), with whom he has two sons and a daughter. He plays tennis and bridge, and is a member of the New Club.

Legal offices
Preceded by Donald Mackay	Solicitor General for Scotland; 1995–1997	Succeeded by Colin Boyd
Preceded by Lord Carloway	Lord President of the Court of Session and Lord Justice General; 2025–present	Incumbent
