= 2002 in Scottish television =

This is a list of events in Scottish television from 2002.

== Events ==
=== January ===
- 23 January – At a meeting of the Scottish Affairs Committee in Westminster, BBC governor Robert Smith, Baron Smith of Kelvin tells the committee that the possibility of a Six O'Clock News bulletin for Scotland will be considered again following next year's Scottish Parliament election.

=== February ===
- 4 February – MPs investigating broadcasting in Scotland visit Glasgow to hear evidence from academics and members of the Scottish Parliament.
- 11 February – On the same day that the BBC launches its two channels for children, CBeebies Alba is launched as the new programming slot for Children's Gaelic Programmes on BBC One Scotland at 2:55 pm – 3:25 pm every weekday .

=== March ===
- 14 March – 50th anniversary of BBC One Scotland.

=== June ===
- CBeebies Alba stops being broadcast on BBC One Scotland.

=== September ===
- 2 September – The preschool series Balamory is first broadcast on BBC.
- 24 September
  - Debut of Scottish soap River City.
  - Border Television is rebranded as ITV Border.

=== November ===
- The BBC's children's programming in Gaelic resume on BBC Two Scotland during CBeebies under the same name CBeebies Alba.

== Debuts ==
=== BBC ===
- 13 March – Snoddy (2002)
- 26 April – Jeopardy on BBC One (2002–2004)
- 1 September – Still Game (2002–2007; 2016–2019)
- 2 September – Balamory (2002–2005)
- 24 September – River City on BBC One (2002–2026)
- 7 October – Bits and Bobs on BBC Two (2002–2003)

== Television series ==
- Scotsport (1957–2008)
- Reporting Scotland (1968–1983; 1984–present)
- Scotland Today (1972–2009)
- Sportscene (1975–present)
- The Beechgrove Garden (1978–present)
- Grampian Today (1980–2009)
- High Road (1980–2003)
- Taggart (1983–2010)
- Crossfire (1984–2004)
- Win, Lose or Draw (1990–2004)
- Only an Excuse? (1993–2020)
- Monarch of the Glen (2000–2005)

== Ending this year ==
- 22 February – Chewin' the Fat (1999–2002)
- 12 December – Harry and the Wrinklies (1999–2002)

== Deaths ==
- 29 August – Alan MacNaughtan, 82, actor
- October – William Dysart, 72, actor

== See also ==
- 2002 in Scotland
