= Criminal Justice Information Services =

Scottish government agency

Criminal Justice Information Services is a department of the Scottish Police Services Authority. Previously called the Scottish Criminal Record Office (SCRO), it established in 1960 with a mission statement "To manage information for the Scottish Police Service, wider Criminal Justice Community and the public to assist in the prevention and detection of crime and enhance public safety." The organisation is based at Pacific Quay in Glasgow, under current Director John McLean.

The high-profile Shirley McKie case has embroiled the SCRO in controversy surrounding its provision of fingerprint identification and verification services. This controversy lead to the separation in 2001 of these services from local control by each of the eight Scottish police forces (Central Scotland Police; Dumfries & Galloway Constabulary; Fife Constabulary; Grampian Police; Lothian & Borders Police; Northern Constabulary; Strathclyde Police; and, Tayside Police) and to the establishment of the Scottish Fingerprint Service.

== Fingerprint controversy ==
In January 1997, an expert from the SCRO identified the left thumb print of DC Shirley McKie, a murder squad detective with Strathclyde Police, as coming from the bathroom door frame inside the house in Kilmarnock of murder victim, Marion Ross. Three other SCRO experts confirmed this thumb print identification but another five SCRO experts, who were asked to do so, refused. Nonetheless DC McKie, who denied ever having been inside the house, was charged with perjury. In May 1999, the Scottish High Court of Justiciary rejected the SCRO fingerprint evidence, and Shirley McKie was unanimously found not guilty of perjury.

HM Inspectors of Constabulary investigated and reported that – despite SCRO's claims – McKie's prints were never at the scene of the murder. In June 2000, the then Justice Minister, Jim Wallace, and Lord Advocate, Lord Boyd, apologised in the Scottish parliament to Shirley McKie. A former Deputy Chief Constable of Tayside Police, James Mackay, and Tayside's head of CID, Detective Chief Superintendent Scott Robertson, were then appointed by the Crown Office to conduct a further investigation into the issues relating to fingerprint evidence and to report back with their findings. Mackay's interim report on 3 August 2000 suggested that SCRO fingerprint personnel had given evidence in court that was:

"so significantly distorted that without further explanation, the SCRO identification likely amounts to collective manipulation and collective collusion."

According to a Scottish Executive Justice Department internal email written by senior official, Sheena Maclaren:

"Mr W Rae, then president of the Association of Chief Police Officers in Scotland (ACPOS) and chairman of SCRO's executive committee, decided that given all the circumstances, all Chief Constables concluded that there was no alternative but to 'precautionary suspend' the four SCRO personnel. This was done on August 3 by the Director of SCRO." Government ministers were informed of the decision to suspend the four fingerprint experts who had wrongly identified a thumb print as PC Shirley McKie's.

Marked 'confidential', the final Mackay and Robertson report was submitted to the Crown Office in October 2000. It took more than five years for details of this report to emerge, but The Scotsman newspaper published extracts from it in February 2006. The report concluded that there was criminal conduct by SCRO employees and that there was sufficient evidence to justify criminal charges. However, the Crown Office told Mackay in September 2001 that no action was to be taken against the SCRO experts. As a result, they were reinstated and employed in the newly created Scottish Fingerprint Service.

During a civil action in February 2003, brought by Shirley McKie against Stathclyde Police for malicious prosecution, the Lord Advocate Lord Boyd argued that expert witnesses should always be immune from prosecution – even if they gave false evidence.
