= 2001 in Scottish television =

This is a list of events in Scottish television from 2001.

== Events ==
=== February ===
- 23 February – Skyline Productions is commissioned to produce Rose's Patch for BBC One, a 60-minute detective comedy set in Glasgow.

=== March ===
- 30 March – The nightly Scottish opt-out of BBC Choice, BBC Choice Scotland, ends and shortly after, BBC Two's variants for Scotland are made available to digital viewers for the first time.

=== June ===
- 7 – 8 June – Television coverage of the 2001 general election.

=== July ===
- 27 July – The digital channel S2 closes following a deal with ITV Digital to screen ITV2 in Scotland.

=== August ===
- 11 August
  - ITV in England and Wales changes its name to ITV1, due to the growing number of other ITV services, including ITV2, ITV Digital, and the ITV Sport Channel, which launches on the same day. STV and Grampian are among the channels to retain their pre-ITV1 identities.
  - BBC Scotland's Saturday afternoon football results show is renamed Sportscene Results. It also becomes a programme in its own right as its predecessor, Afternoon Sportscene, had been an opt-out from Grandstand's Final Score segment.

=== September ===
- 1 September – 40th anniversary of Border Television.
- 30 September
  - 40th anniversary of Grampian Television.
  - Border Television is taken over by Granada plc.

== Television series ==
- Scotsport (1957–2008)
- Reporting Scotland (1968–1983; 1984–present)
- Scotland Today (1972–2009)
- Sportscene (1975–present)
- The Beechgrove Garden (1978–present)
- Grampian Today (1980–2009)
- High Road (1980–2003)
- Taggart (1983–2010)
- Crossfire (1984–2004)
- Win, Lose or Draw (1990–2004)
- Only an Excuse? (1993–2020)
- Chewin' the Fat (1999–2002)
- Harry and the Wrinklies (1999–2002)
- Monarch of the Glen (2000–2005)

== Ending this year ==
- 10 December – Tinsel Town (2000–2001)
- 20 December – Wheel of Fortune (1988–2001)

== Deaths ==
- 17 January – Robert Robertson, 70, actor
- 12 June – Joseph Brady, 72, actor
- 18 August – Tom Watson, 68, actor

== See also ==
- 2001 in Scotland
