= Anthony Campbell (judge) =

Irish judge (born 1936)

Sir William Anthony Campbell PC (born 30 October 1936) is a judge, former Lord Justice of Appeal in Northern Ireland from 1998 to 2008.

== Background ==
Campbell, the son of Harold Campbell CBE, attended Campbell College, Belfast, and Queens' College, Cambridge.

== Law career ==
In 1960, Campbell was called to the Bar by both Gray's Inn and the Inn of Court of Northern Ireland. He was made a Bencher of the Inn of Court of Northern Ireland in 1983 and a Bencher at Gray's Inn in 1995. Sir Anthony was appointed Queen's Counsel in 1974. He was promoted to the High Court of Justice of Northern Ireland 1988 and served until 1998 when he was further elevated to become a Lord Justice of Appeal. Sir Anthony Campbell retired during the summer of 2008.

== Post-retirement ==
In October 2008, Sir Anthony Campbell was appointed to chair the Fingerprint Inquiry, a public inquiry set up by Scottish Government ministers to investigate the steps taken to verify the fingerprints associated with the case of HM Advocate v McKie in 1999, and related matters.

He served an additional four years as a judge of the Cayman Islands Court of Appeal, retiring from that court in 2014.
