= 1997 in Scottish television =

This is a list of events in Scottish television from 1997.

== Events ==
=== January ===
- 7 January – ITV's Carlton Television presents Monarchy: The Nation Decides, a live studio debate discussing the future of the Monarchy in the United Kingdom. The debate quickly descends into a shouting match, while viewers are encouraged to vote on the issue in what is the UK's largest television phone poll. However, Carlton is forced to extend the deadline for calls following complaints from people unable to get through. Of the 2.6million callers who vote, 66% are in favour of retaining a monarch while 34% are against. The proportion of votes against is higher among Scottish viewers, with 56% in favour of replacing the monarch.

=== March ===
- 30 March – Channel 5, the UK's fifth and last terrestrial channel, launches at 6.00 pm. Coverage is limited with many parts of Scotland unable to receive the new channel.

=== April ===
- April – Establishment of Scottish Screen, the national body for film and television in Scotland.

=== May ===
- 1 May – Television coverage of the 1997 General Election.

=== June ===
- June – Grampian Television is bought by Scottish Media Group for £105 million.
- 8 June – Last football match commentated by Jock Brown for BBC Scotland which was a World Cup Qualifier when Scotland played away to Belarus to win 1–0. He leaves the station at the end of the month to take on a role as general manager at Celtic F.C.
- 25 June – The Independent Television Commission (ITC) awards the sole DTT broadcast licence to British Digital Broadcasting.

=== August ===
- 2 August – Rob MacLean becomes the main football commentator on Sportscene which returns for the new season succeeding Jock Brown.
- 31 August – BBC1 continues to air through the whole night, simulcasting with BBC World News to bring news updates of Diana, Princess of Wales's car accident. All of the day's other scheduled programmes on BBC1 Scotland are cancelled to keep viewers up to date with the latest developments with ITV cancelling its regular programmes until mid-evening. ITV broadcasts a 30-minute regional bulletin at lunchtime and BBC1 Scotland airs an extended Scottish bulletin later in the day.

=== September ===
- 6 September – The live broadcast of the funeral of Diana, Princess of Wales is watched by 2.5 billion viewers worldwide. The ceremony's footage goes down in the Guinness World Records as the biggest TV audience for a live broadcast. In the UK, 32.10 million viewers watch the broadcast. It is the UK's second most-watched broadcast of all time, behind 1966's World Cup final.
- 11 September – Television coverage of Referendum in Scotland on the creation of a national Parliament with devolved powers. BBC Scotland's coverage is broadcast across the UK on BBC1.

=== October ===
- 6 October – BBC Scotland on 1 and BBC Scotland on 2 change name to BBC One Scotland and BBC Two Scotland respectively.

=== December ===
- 20 December – The ITC awards the three pay-TV digital multiplex licences to British Digital Broadcasting.

=== Unknown ===
- Scottish Television legally changes its name to Scottish Media Group.
- Formation of BAFTA Scotland.

== Debuts ==
=== BBC ===
- 29 March – The Missing Postman (1997)

== Television series ==
- Scotsport (1957–2008)
- Reporting Scotland (1968–1983; 1984–present)
- Top Club (1971–1998)
- Scotland Today (1972–2009)
- Sportscene (1975–present)
- The Beechgrove Garden (1978–present)
- Grampian Today (1980–2009)
- High Road (1980–2003)
- Taggart (1983–2010)
- Crossfire (1984–2004)
- Wheel of Fortune (1988–2001)
- Fun House (1989–1999)
- Win, Lose or Draw (1990–2004)
- Machair (1993–1999)
- Telefios (1993–2000)
- Only an Excuse? (1993–2020)
- McCallum (1995–1998)

== Ending this year ==
- 1 January – Hurricanes (1993–1997)
- 4 May – Hamish Macbeth (1995–1997)

== Deaths ==
- 12 September – Leonard Maguire, 73, actor
- 5 October – Andrew Keir, 71, actor

== See also ==
- 1997 in Scotland
