= 1996 in Scottish television =

This is a list of events in Scottish television from 1996.

== Events ==
=== June ===
- Scottish launches a new political programme, called Platform.

=== July ===
- Scottish Television acquires Caledonian Publishing, publishers of The Herald and Glasgow Evening Times.

=== October ===
- 6 October – Scottish Television launches a new set of idents

=== November ===
- 1 November – Launch of the satellite television channel Sky Scottish.
- 22 November – After nearly four year on air, Scottish Gaelic learners' television programmeSpeaking our Language ends after 72 episodes.

== Television series ==
- Scotsport (1957–2008)
- Reporting Scotland (1968–1983; 1984–present)
- Top Club (1971–1998)
- Scotland Today (1972–2009)
- Sportscene (1975–present)
- The Beechgrove Garden (1978–present)
- Grampian Today (1980–2009)
- High Road (1980–2003)
- Taggart (1983–2010)
- Crossfire (1984–2004)
- Wheel of Fortune (1988–2001)
- Fun House (1989–1999)
- Win, Lose or Draw (1990–2004)
- Hurricanes (1993–1997)
- Machair (1993–1999)
- Telefios (1993–2000)
- Only an Excuse? (1993–2020)
- Hamish Macbeth (1995–1997)

== Ending this year ==
- 18 September - Wolf It (1993–1996)
- 22 November - Speaking our Language (1993–1996)
- 20 December - Doctor Finlay (1993–1996)

== Deaths ==
- 30 October – John Young, 80, actor (Take The High Road)

== See also ==
- 1996 in Scotland
