= Wilderness Scotland =

Travel and holiday companies of the United Kingdom

- Company type: Tour Operator
- Industry: Tourism
- Founded: 2001
- Headquarters: Aviemore, Scotland, UK
- Products: Small group adventures
- Number of employees: 36 office team and 50 guides
- Website: www.wildernessscotland.com

Wilderness Scotland is a tour operator specialising in active and nature based travel throughout Scotland, Ireland and North of England.

== History ==
Wilderness Scotland was started in September 2001 by Neil Birnie, Paul Easto and Gordon Birnie, and they were later joined by Stevie Christie. There are now 36 core staff and over 50 guides. The guides are all qualified through the National Governing Body relevant to their skills e.g. - Scottish Mountain Leader Association. Wilderness Scotland's first ever trip visited Knoydart in 2001.

== Sustainable tourism ==
Wilderness Scotland is dedicated to sustainable tourism which is environmentally, culturally and socially responsible (ecotourism) for small groups only. The company operates to strict environmental standards and is committed to supporting the local economies in which it operates. It holds the Green Tourism Gold Award. It was awarded second place in the 2008 Guardian Ethical Travel Award. It was winner of the Best Green Tour Operator award in the 2007 World Travel Awards and again in 2014.

In 2006 Wilderness Scotland was Highly Commended at the World Responsible Tourism Awards. In 2007 it received the Investing in the Environment award at the Highlands and Islands Tourism Awards. It has been part of National Geographic's survey rating adventure travel companies.

== Holidays ==
Wilderness Scotland organises small group trips including walking holidays, sea kayaking, mountain biking, ski touring holidays, canoeing, and photography. Their trips take people to locations such as Knoydart, the Cairngorms and Torridon; as well as islands including Skye, the Outer Hebrides, Orkney and Shetland. The company also offers self-guided walking holidays, family activity holidays and customised private group holidays.

== Sibling and charitable projects ==
Wilderness Ireland is Wilderness Scotland's sister company and is based on the west coast of Ireland in Sligo. The Ireland operation offers a very similar style of guided active and nature-based holidays and has been operational since 2013. The company works with Trees for Life, a registered charity, to contribute to creating a "Wilderness Forest" in Dundreggan. It also participates in the Leave No Trace education programme to promote enjoyment of the natural world through responsible outdoor access and practice.

== Business awards and achievements ==
- 2018 – 8th Great Place to Work in the UK (Small Category)
- 2014 – World's leading Green Tour Operator, World Travel Awards
- 2007 – Highlands and Islands Tourism Awards, Investing in the Environment
