= Alan Mackay (reporter) =

Scottish reporter

Alan Mackay was a long-serving reporter for BBC Scotland's Reporting Scotland. He is the brother of the High Court judge Donald Mackay, Baron Mackay of Drumadoon. He left the programme in 2007 after over twenty-five years in television journalism.

One of the most notable stories he covered was the Dunblane massacre in 1996. Mackay himself lived in the town, and his own son went to the school where the massacre took place.
