= Gerry Moynihan =

Gerry Moynihan KC is a Scottish advocate who was Standing Junior Counsel for the Scottish Office in relation to planning matters from 1990 to 1995. Moynihan was appointed QC in 1997 and was an Advocate Depute from 1995 to 1998.

Moynihan undertakes a wide range of civil litigation from commercial disputes to professional negligence. Moynihan has an extensive practice in Human Rights and Administrative Law, and is instructed on behalf of public bodies including the Scottish Criminal Cases Review Commission, for whom he acted in recovering records from the Lord Advocate. He obtained compensation for a number of litigants in a class action in 2005. He is currently Counsel to the Fingerprint Inquiry, an inquiry set by the Scottish Government under the Inquiries Act 2005.

== Previous cases ==
- Land Securities v Scottish Ministers [2006] UKHL 48, 2006 SLT 1019
- Somerville v Scottish Ministers [2007] UKHL 44, 2008 SC(HL) 45
- Spiers v Ruddy [2007] UKPC D2, 2008 SLT 39
- B v Murray [2008] UKHL 32, 2008 SC (HL) 146
- Helow v Advocate General [2008] UKHL 62, 2008 SLT 967
