= Thomas Dawson, Lord Dawson =

Scottish lawyer (1948–2007)

The Honourable Lord Dawson

Senator of the College of Justice
- In office 1995–2007
- Appointed by: Queen Elizabeth

Solicitor General for Scotland
- In office 15 April 1992 – 4 May 1995
- Prime Minister: John Major
- Preceded by: Alan Rodger
- Succeeded by: Donald Mackay

Personal details
- Born: Thomas Cordner Dawson; 14 November 1948
- Died: 1 June 2007 (aged 58)
- Education: University of Edinburgh

Thomas Cordner Dawson, Lord Dawson (14 November 1948 – 8 June 2007) was a Scottish lawyer. He was Solicitor General for Scotland from 1992 until his appointment in 1995 as a Senator of the College of Justice, a judge of the Supreme Courts of Scotland, and held this post until his death in 2007.

== Early life ==
Dawson was educated at the Royal High School of Edinburgh and studied at the School of Law of the University of Edinburgh. He lectured at the University of Dundee from 1971 to 1974, and was admitted to the Faculty of Advocates in 1973, becoming Queen's Counsel in 1986.

== Legal career ==
Dawson practised as an Advocate Depute from 1983 to 1987, prosecuting criminal cases on behalf of the Lord Advocate, and was counsel to the 1988 Piper Alpha Inquiry. In 1992, he was appointed Solicitor General for Scotland, the deputy of the Lord Advocate, succeeding Alan Rodger, who was appointed to the superior post. In 1995, Dawson was appointed a Senator of the College of Justice, a judge of Scotland's Supreme Courts with the judicial title "Lord Dawson". He was succeeded as Solicitor General by Donald Mackay, who would only months later become Lord Advocate.

A 2008 investigation by the Sunday Times found Dawson had the second highest rate of having his sentences or convictions overturned on appeal, with thirty successful appeals against sentence and three against conviction in the past five years. The judge with the most successful appeals was former Lord Advocate Lord Hardie.

== Personal life ==
Dawson married Jennifer Crombie in 1975, with whom he had two sons. He died on 8 June 2007 after a long illness.

Legal offices
Preceded by Alan Rodger	Solicitor General for Scotland; 1992–1995	Succeeded by Donald Mackay
