= Jannette Anderson =

Scottish biochemist

Kathleen Jannette Anderson OBE FRSE FRCC (1927–2002) was a 20th-century Scottish biochemist, highly involved in the transition of Napier College into Napier University.

She was appointed vice principal of Edinburgh's Napier University in 1983, becoming the first woman to be appointed to such a senior post in a Scottish university.

== Life ==
She was born in July 1927.

She was raised in Glasgow and educated at Queen's Park School, Glasgow, before studying biology at Glasgow University.

In 1972 she oversaw Napier University's first major grant-aided study: looking at the impact of Edinburgh's sewerage system on the ecology of the Firth of Forth.

Anderson was a biologist who was a Fellow of the Royal Society of Edinburgh, Fellow of the Institute of Biology, Fellow of the Royal College of Chemistry, Fellow of the Scottish Vocational Education Council and was awarded an OBE in 1987 for services to education. She developed the first interdisciplinary degree course at Napier College (now Edinburgh Napier University) and also significantly contributed to the development of research within the university.

In 1995 she was elected a Fellow of the Royal Society of Edinburgh.

In later life she was a Director of St George's School for Girls in west Edinburgh. Her address at this time was 40 Barony Terrace.

She died of a pre-existing heart condition on 5 July 2002.

== Family ==
She was married to Mark and they had one son and one daughter.

== Career ==
=== Academic ===
- Lecturer in botany at West of Scotland College of Agriculture
- Research Fellow and Lecturer in biochemistry
- Senior lecturer at Napier College
- Vice-principal at Edinburgh Napier University

=== Directorship of companies ===
Anderson was director of the following companies:

- Napier University Ventures Limited 1988 – 1992
- Scottish Vocational Education Council 1989 – 1992
- St George's School for Girls 1990- 2000
- The Royal Observatory (Edinburgh) Trust 1991 – 1999
- The Thomas Telford Trust

== Publications ==
- Read, P. A.; Renshaw, T.; Anderson, K. J. (April 1978). "Pollution Effects on Intertidal Macrobenthic Communities". The Journal of Applied Ecology. 15 (1): 15. doi:10.2307/2402918.
- Read, P.A.; Renshaw, T.; Jackes, A.D.; Watson, P.G.; Anderson, K.J. (December 1977). "Water quality in the forth estuary: A discriminant functional analysis". Environmental Pollution. 14 (4): 275–287. doi:10.1016/0013-9327(77)90139-2.
