= Inside Out (2000 TV series) =

Inside Out was a short-lived Scottish children's television show, produced by Scottish Television (now STV Central) and broadcast each Saturday and Sunday afternoon, from August to December 2000. The show was also broadcast on neighbouring ITV station, Grampian Television (now STV North).

The series was presented by David Sneddon. Sneddon went on to win the first series of the BBC's Fame Academy in 2002. He is now in 2012 a successful songwriter in London and has written music chart songs for artists such as Hurts, Morten Harket of A-ha, X Factor winner Matt Cardle, Newton Faulkner and number one selling American singer Lana Del Rey. His presenting partner on the show was the actress Christina Cochran, now known as Christina Strachan. The show consisted of on-location features, comedy and cartoons.

Cartoons on the programme included Birdz, Mythic Warriors, and Sherlock Holmes in the 22nd Century.

== See also ==
wknd@stv, a similar STV weekend children's series broadcast in 2009.
