= Fingerprint Inquiry =

2005 Scottish public inquiry

Letterhead shown in the report

The Fingerprint Inquiry was a public inquiry set up by Scottish Government ministers under the Inquiries Act 2005 to look at the steps which were taken to identify and verify the fingerprints associated with the case of HM Advocate v McKie in 1999. The Inquiry was to determine the consequences of steps taken, report on findings of fact and make recommendations.

== Terms of reference ==
The Fingerprint Inquiry had the following terms of reference:

- To inquire into the steps that were taken to identify and verify the fingerprints associated with, and leading up to, the case of HM Advocate v. McKie in 1999, and
- To determine, in relation to the fingerprint designated Y7, the consequences of the steps taken, or not taken, and
- To report findings of fact and make recommendations as to what measures might now be introduced, beyond those that have already been introduced since 1999, to ensure that any shortcomings are avoided in the future.

== Inquiry proceedings ==
The Inquiry was announced by Justice Secretary Kenny MacAskill in March 2008. An Initial Hearing was held in October 2008, followed by a Procedural Hearing in November 2008.

Chairman, Sir Anthony Campbell, opened the evidence hearings on Tuesday 2 June 2009 at Maryhill Community Central Hall, Glasgow. Following Sir Anthony's introductory statement, Senior Counsel to the Inquiry made an opening statement which included a public presentation of all the material that the Inquiry has collected. Thereafter, legal representatives for the core participants were given an opportunity to make their opening statements, followed by any submissions.

The Inquiry began taking oral evidence on Tuesday 9 June. The core participants were:

- The Lord Advocate
- Sir Stephen House, Chief Constable of Strathclyde Police
- Scottish Police Services Authority
- Alan Dunbar
- Terence Foley
- Alister Geddes
- David Halliday
- Fiona McBride
- Anthony McKenna
- Robert Mackenzie
- Hugh Macpherson
- Malcolm Ross
- Charles Stewart
- Peter Swann
- Pat Wertheim
- David Asbury (whose murder conviction was quashed on appeal)
- Shirley McKie
- Iain McKie (Ms McKie's father)

== Issues ==
In 2009 it was reported that Gerry Moynihan QC, Senior Counsel to the Inquiry, had a potential conflict of interest relating to the Shirley McKie case. Sir Anthony Campbell had considered this issue in March 2009 and decided that Mr Moynihan should continue to act as senior counsel to the inquiry. His decision was communicated to core participants on 16 March 2009 and published on the inquiry website.

In 2007, the media reported that there may have been a link between the McKie fingerprint case and the Lockerbie bombing. However, evidence of this alleged link had yet to be substantiated.

== Report ==
The Inquiry Report was published on 11 December 2011. The Inquiry's findings, summarised by the chairman, were:

1. There is no evidence other than the mark Y7 to suggest that Ms McKie at any time entered Miss Ross's house beyond the area of the porch.
2. The mark Y7 on the door-frame of the bathroom in Miss Ross's house was misidentified as the fingerprint of Ms McKie.
3. Ms McKie did not make the mark Y7.
4. There was no conspiracy against Ms McKie in Strathclyde Police and all reasonable steps were taken by that force to seek from the Scottish Criminal Record Office fingerprint bureau confirmation of the identification of Y7.
5. The mark QI2 Ross (on the tin) was misidentified as the fingerprint of Miss Ross.
6. There was no impropriety on the part of any of the Scottish Criminal Record Office fingerprint examiners who misidentified the mark Y7 as having been made by Ms McKie or the mark QI2 Ross as having been made by Miss Ross. These were opinions that they genuinely held.
7. The marks Y7 and QI2 Ross were both misidentified by the Scottish Criminal Record Office fingerprint examiners due to human error and there is nothing sinister about the fact that these two errors occurred in the same case.
8. The misidentifications of Y7 and QI2 Ross expose weaknesses in the methodology of fingerprint comparison and in particular where it involves complex marks.
9. Fingerprint examiners are presently ill-equipped to reason their conclusions as they are accustomed to regarding their conclusions as a matter of certainty and seldom challenged.
10. There is no reason to suggest that fingerprint comparison in general is an inherently unreliable form of evidence but practitioners and fact-finders alike require to give due consideration to the limits of the discipline.

The Inquiry made 86 recommendations for future action.
