= Donald Ross, Lord Ross =

Scottish judge (1927–2025)

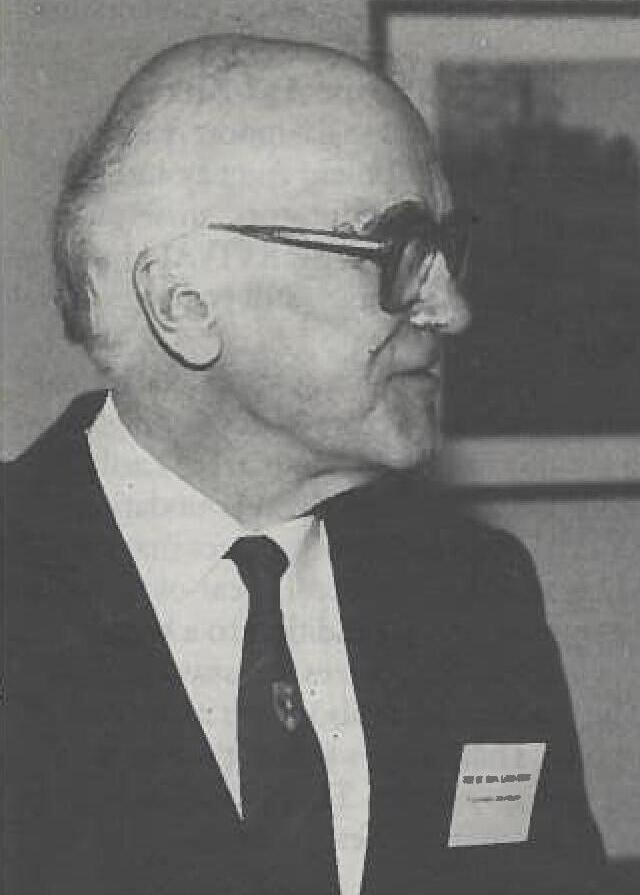
The Rt. Hon. Lord Ross, The Lord Justice Clerk of Scotland at COL's judicial education workshop in March 1992

Donald MacArthur Ross, Lord Ross, PC, FRSE (29 March 1927 – 26 April 2025) was Lord Justice Clerk, the second most senior judge in Scotland.

== Background ==
Ross was born in Dundee on 29 March 1927. He was educated at the High School of Dundee and the University of Edinburgh. Ross was married with two daughters and six grandchildren. He died on 26 April 2025, at the age of 98.

== Career ==
Ross was admitted to the Faculty of Advocates and became a Queen's Counsel in 1964. He was Sheriff of Ayr and Bute (1972 to 1973), Dean of the Faculty of Advocates (1973 to 1976), and appointed a Senator of the College of Justice on 17 November 1976. He served as Lord Justice Clerk from 1985 until 1997.

Ross also received an Honorary Doctorate from Heriot-Watt University in 1988.

In 1990 and 1991, he was Lord High Commissioner to the General Assembly of the Church of Scotland. He was an elder at Canongate Kirk in Edinburgh.

From 1997 to 2001, Ross was Chairman of the Judicial Studies Committee for Scotland. He became a Privy Counsellor in 1985 and was elected a fellow of the Royal Society of Edinburgh in 1988, where he was Vice-President from 1999 until 2002. He was the Honorary President of The Dundee High School Old Boys' Club.

He sentenced paedophile Bill Kelly, who pleaded guilty to 14 charges of indecent sexual assault on children, to a custodial sentence of 12 months as he deemed the victims to "not have suffered long term damage".

Legal offices
Preceded by Lord Wheatley	Lord Justice Clerk; 1985–1997	Succeeded by Lord Cullen
