= Donald Mackay, Baron Mackay of Drumadoon =

British judge (1946–2018)

The Right Honourable The Lord Mackay of Drumadoon PC

Senator of the College of Justice
- In office 2000–2013
- Nominated by: Donald Dewar
- Monarch: Elizabeth II

Member of the House of Lords
- Lord Temporal
- Life peerage 13 December 1995 – 17 January 2017

Lord Advocate
- In office 7 November 1995 – 2 May 1997
- Prime Minister: John Major
- Preceded by: The Lord Rodger of Earlsferry
- Succeeded by: The Lord Hardie

Solicitor General for Scotland
- In office 4 May 1995 – 7 November 1995
- Prime Minister: John Major
- Preceded by: Thomas Dawson
- Succeeded by: Paul Cullen

Personal details
- Born: Donald Sage Mackay; 30 January 1946 Aberdeen, Scotland
- Died: 21 August 2018 (aged 72) Edinburgh, Scotland
- Party: Conservative
- Spouse: Lesley Waugh (m. 1979)
- Relations: Alan Mackay (brother)
- Children: 3
- Education: University of Edinburgh; University of Virginia
- Profession: Advocate

Donald Sage Mackay, Baron Mackay of Drumadoon, PC (30 January 1946 – 21 August 2018) was a British judge of the Supreme Courts of Scotland, and a Lord Advocate, the country's senior Law Officer. He was also one of five additional Lords of Appeal in the House of Lords, where he sat as a crossbencher.

== Early life ==
Mackay was born in Aberdeen in 1946, to Donald George Mackintosh Mackay and Jean Margaret Mackay, and educated at the private George Watson's College, Edinburgh. He was the brother of the BBC news reporter Alan Mackay.

He studied at the School of Law of the University of Edinburgh (LLB, LLM), and at the School of Law of the University of Virginia (LLM).

Mackay was admitted as a solicitor in 1971 and practised for five years with Allan McDougall & Company SSC, becoming a member of the Society of Solicitors in the Supreme Courts of Scotland in 1973, before being admitted to the Faculty of Advocates in 1976. From 1982 to 1985, he served as an Advocate Depute, a prosecutor in the High Court, and took silk in 1987. From 1988 to 1992, he served as a temporary sheriff, and from 1989 to 1995 sat on the Board of the Criminal Injuries Compensation Authority.

== Government ==
In 1995, he replaced Thomas Dawson as Solicitor General for Scotland on the other's appointment as a judge of the Supreme Courts of Scotland, and later that year succeeded Lord Rodger of Earlsferry as Lord Advocate, on the other's appointment as Lord President of the Court of Session and Lord Justice General, the most senior judge in Scotland. He was duly created a life peer on 13 December 1995, as Baron Mackay of Drumadoon, of Blackwaterfoot in the District of Cunninghame, and became a Privy Counsellor in 1996. Prior to Scottish devolution in 1999, the Lord Advocate was a political appointment, therefore the Conservative defeat in the 1997 general election, saw Mackay replaced by Labour's Lord Hardie. Between May 1997 and March 2000, he combined practice as a senior counsel with an active role in the House of Lords as Opposition Spokesman on Scotland and Constitutional Affairs.

== The bench ==
Mackay was appointed a judge of the Court of Session and High Court of Justiciary, Scotland's highest courts, in March 2000. Mackay was also one of five members of the House of Lords, in addition to the twelve Lords of Appeal in Ordinary, eligible to form the quorum of the House required to hear and determine judicial business under ss.5&25 of the Appellate Jurisdiction Act 1876. In October 2009 the judicial functions of the House of Lords were transferred to the new Supreme Court of the United Kingdom under Part 3 of the Constitutional Reform Act 2005, with the twelve Lords of Appeal in Ordinary becoming the inaugural Justices of the Court. While ss.38 and 39 allow for additional judges to sit in the Court, Mackay's position as a serving judge of the Outer House of the Court of Session excluded him from both of these provisions.

He retired from the membership of the House of Lords on 17 January 2017.

== Personal life and death ==
In 1979, Mackay married Lesley Ann Waugh. They had three children.

Mackay died from dementia at a nursing home in Edinburgh on 21 August 2018, at the age of 72.

== See also ==
- Senator of the College of Justice

Legal offices
Preceded by Thomas Dawson	Solicitor General for Scotland; 1995	Succeeded by Paul Cullen
Preceded by The Lord Rodger of Earlsferry	Lord Advocate; 1995–1997	Succeeded by The Lord Hardie
