= Colin Boyd, Baron Boyd of Duncansby =

Scottish judge

The Right Honourable The Lord Boyd of Duncansby PC
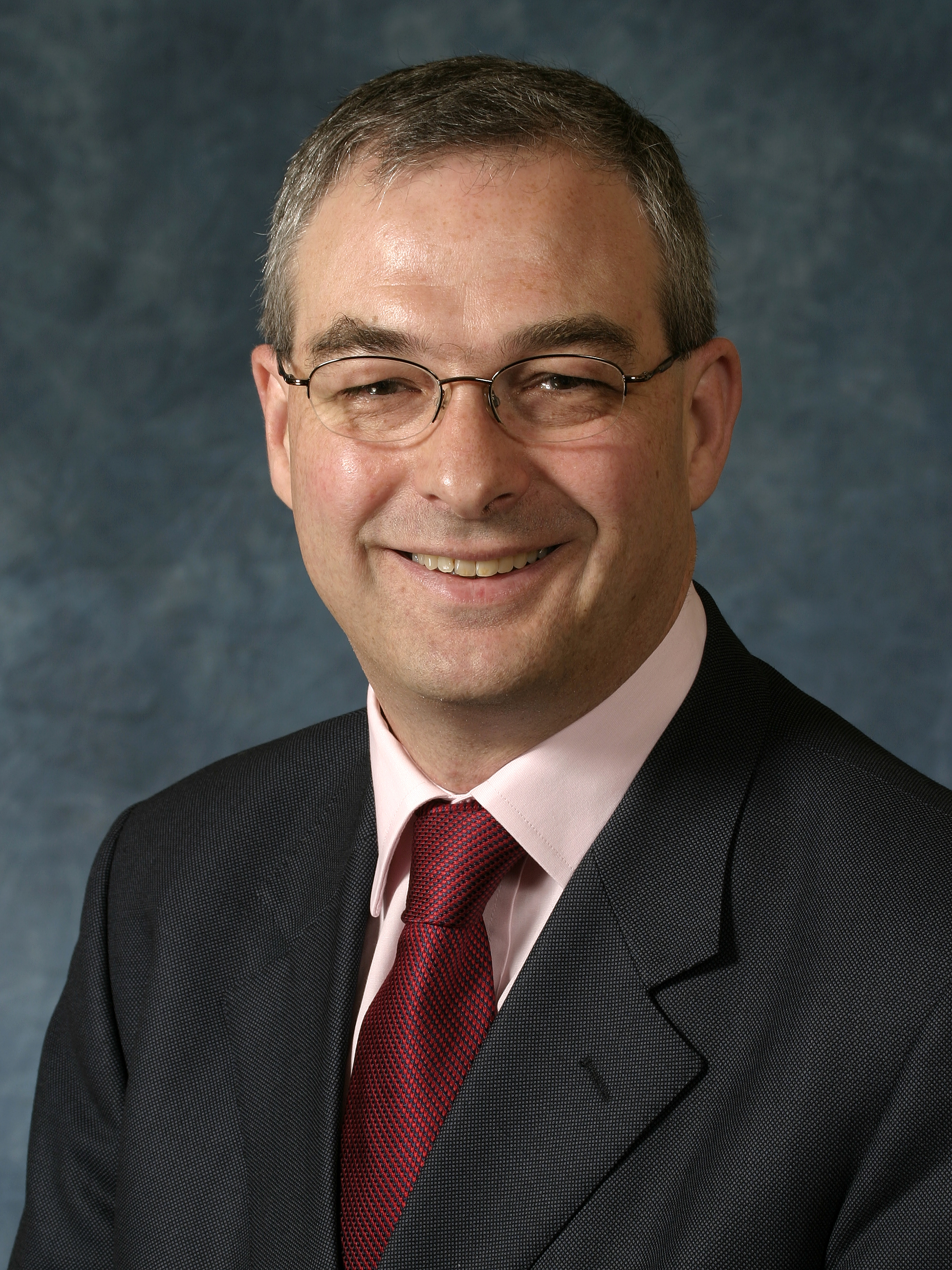
- Official portrait, 2003

Lord Advocate
- In office 24 February 2000 – 4 October 2006
- Monarch: Elizabeth II
- First Minister: Donald Dewar; Jim Wallace (acting); Henry McLeish; Jim Wallace (acting); Jack McConnell
- Preceded by: Lord Hardie
- Succeeded by: Elish Angiolini

Solicitor General for Scotland
- In office 1997–2000
- Monarch: Elizabeth II
- First Minister: Donald Dewar
- Preceded by: Paul Cullen
- Succeeded by: Neil Davidson

Senator of the College of Justice
- In office 1 June 2012 – June 2024
- Monarch: Elizabeth II

Member of the House of Lords
- Lord Temporal
- Life peerage 14 June 2006

Personal details
- Born: Colin Boyd; 7 June 1953 (age 73)
- Party: Labour
- Education: University of Edinburgh
- Occupation: Judge
- Profession: Barrister

Colin Boyd, Baron Boyd of Duncansby, PC (born 7 June 1953) is a former Scottish judge who was a Senator of the College of Justice from June 2012 to June 2024. He previously served as the Lord Advocate from 24 February 2000 until his resignation on 4 October 2006. On 11 April 2006, Downing Street announced that Colin Boyd would take a seat as a crossbench life peer; however, he took the Labour whip after resigning as Lord Advocate. He was formally introduced in the House of Lords on 3 July 2006.

On 16 May 2007, the day SNP leader Alex Salmond was elected First Minister of Scotland, it was reported that Boyd was quitting the Scottish Bar to become a part-time consultant with public law solicitors Dundas & Wilson. He told the Glasgow Herald, "This is a first. I don't think a Lord Advocate has ever done this—left the Bar and become a solicitor."

== Biography ==
=== Early life and legal career ===
Lord Boyd's title is taken from Duncansby Head in Caithness – a favourite spot for family outings when he was a child living in Wick. He was educated at Wick High School and George Watson's College, Edinburgh, and graduated BA (Econ) from Manchester University in politics and economics, and LLB from Edinburgh University. He was a solicitor in private practice before being called to the Scottish Bar in 1983. Boyd was an Advocate Depute from 1993 to 1995 and took Silk as Queen's Counsel in 1995. He is a legal associate of the Royal Town Planning Institute. As an advocate he built up a practice in administrative law.

=== Political career ===
As a university student, he joined the Labour Party but left to join the breakaway Scottish Labour Party, sharing the SLP founder Jim Sillars' distrust of the mainstream Labour Party to follow through on its commitment to devolution. Boyd stood as a parliamentary candidate for the SLP at the 1979 general election in the Edinburgh Central constituency, but garnered only 176 votes. When the SLP disbanded, after its failure to make an impact at that election, he decided to rejoin the Labour Party rather than follow Sillars into the Scottish National Party. Following the 1997 general election, he was appointed Solicitor General for Scotland. He was promoted to Lord Advocate in 2000 upon the elevation of Andrew Hardie to the bench. He was appointed a Privy Counsellor in 2000.

=== Peerage ===
Following the announcement on 11 April 2006 of Boyd's appointment to the House of Lords, his peerage nomination became a talking point in Scottish political circles. Opposition politicians stated that a peerage politicised the head of the judiciary. Boyd defended the appointment:

I remain firmly committed to the full time role of Lord Advocate, leading the Crown Office and Procurator Fiscal Service, and seeing through the programme of reform I initiated four years ago. Appointment to the House of Lords is a natural extension of my duties as Lord Advocate and a development which will allow me to represent Scotland's interests at home and at UK level.

In December 2006, after Boyd had been replaced as Lord Advocate by Elish Angiolini, First Minister Jack McConnell was questioned by the Metropolitan Police about his nomination of Boyd for a peerage. McConnell said he was "disappointed" over what he regarded as a "normal and straightforward nomination" becoming caught up in Scotland Yard's cash for peerages investigation.

=== Lockerbie trial ===
Lord Boyd of Duncansby's role as Lord Advocate featured leading the prosecution in the Pan Am Flight 103 bombing trial between May 2000 and January 2001. Of the two defendants, one – Fhimah – was acquitted and the other – Megrahi – was convicted on 31 January 2001 of 270 counts of murder, and sentenced to 27 years in jail. Controversy continues to surround Megrahi's conviction despite the rejection of his appeal on 14 March 2002. Evidence presented at the trial has been called into question and doubts have been expressed about the reliability of several key prosecution witnesses. According to The Sunday Times of 23 October 2005 former Lord Advocate Lord Fraser of Carmyllie described one such witness as "not quite the full shilling" and "an apple short of a picnic". Boyd has demanded that Lord Fraser should issue a public statement clarifying what he actually said about this witness, and what he meant by those remarks.

=== Fingerprint controversy ===
In February 2006, Boyd was drawn into the detective constable Shirley McKie fingerprint controversy, when she was awarded £750,000 compensation in an out-of-court settlement. As Solicitor General, Boyd was responsible for the prosecution of DC McKie after she denied an accusation by Scottish Criminal Record Office (SCRO) fingerprint officers that she left her thumb print at a murder scene in January 1997. McKie was arrested in March 1998, charged with perjury but at her trial in May 1999 the SCRO fingerprint evidence was rejected, and she was acquitted.

A senior Scottish police officer, James Mackay QPM, was appointed in June 2000 by the Crown Office to investigate the matter. Mackay's interim report in August 2000 suggested that the evidence given in court by the four SCRO personnel amounted to 'collective manipulation and collective collusion'. As a result, the four fingerprint officers were immediately suspended by SCRO, and Scottish ministers were informed. Mackay's final confidential report was presented to the Lord Advocate in October 2000. The report remained under wraps until extracts were published in the Scotsman newspaper in February 2006. Mackay had concluded that 'cover-up and criminality' had taken place at SCRO and recommended that the four fingerprint officers should be prosecuted. However, the Scotsman also revealed that Boyd had decided in September 2001 to take no action in response to Mackay's recommendation, and the four SCRO officers were reinstated.

In June 2007, the same newspaper raised questions over to what extent Boyd's decision not to prosecute the SCRO personnel in the autumn of 2000 was related to the then ongoing Pan Am Flight 103 bombing trial, where he was leading the prosecution. With the eyes of the world focused upon the Scottish judicial system, it could have undermined the Crown's case to have the SCRO scrutinized and its fingerprint experts prosecuted for covering up acts of criminality. Veteran Lockerbie campaigner and retired Labour MP Tam Dalyell asked Boyd 'to consider his position', while Michael Russell MSP insisted that Boyd could not continue as Lord Advocate.

Boyd's successor as Lord Advocate, Elish Angiolini, has agreed to appear before the Fingerprint Inquiry which began on 2 June 2009.

=== College of Justice ===
On 1 June 2012, it was announced Boyd would be appointed a Senator of the College of Justice. On 7 December 2021, it was announced that Boyd would be appointed to the Inner House of the Court of Session with effect from 5 January 2022. He retired in 2024.

== See also ==
- Pan Am Flight 103
- Pan Am Flight 103 bombing trial
- Pan Am Flight 103 bombing investigation
- Pan Am Flight 103 conspiracy theories
- Hans Köchler's Lockerbie trial observer mission
- List of Scottish governments
- Lord Fraser of Carmyllie

== Publications ==
Boyd contributed to a book The Legal Aspects of Devolution published just before the 1997 general election.

Legal offices
Preceded by Paul Cullen	Solicitor General for Scotland; 1997–2000	Succeeded by Neil Davidson
Preceded by Andrew Hardie	Lord Advocate; 2000–2006	Succeeded by Elish Angiolini
Orders of precedence in the United Kingdom
Preceded by The Lord Low of Dalston	Gentlemen; Baron Boyd of Duncansby	Followed by The Lord Dear
