= Judicial functions of the House of Lords =

Historical role of the UK House of Lords

Appellate Committee of the House of Lords
- Established: 1 November 1876
- Dissolved: 30 September 2009
- Location: Palace of Westminster, London
- Composition method: Appointed by Monarch on advice of Prime Minister. Chosen name recommended to PM by a selection commission.
- Authorised by: Convention; Appellate Jurisdiction Act 1876
- Judge term length: Life tenure
- Number of positions: 12

Senior Law Lord

Second Senior Law Lord

Whilst the House of Lords of the United Kingdom is the upper chamber of Parliament and has government ministers, for many centuries it had a judicial function. It functioned as a court of first instance for the trials of peers and for impeachments, and as a court of last resort in the United Kingdom and prior, the Kingdom of Great Britain and the Kingdom of England.

Appeals were technically not to the House of Lords, but rather to the King-in-Parliament. The Appellate Jurisdiction Act 1876 devolved the appellate functions of the House to an Appellate Committee, composed of Lords of Appeal in Ordinary (informally referred to as Law Lords). They were then appointed by the Lord Chancellor in the same manner as other judges.

During the 20th and early 21st century, the judicial functions were gradually removed. Its final trial of a peer was in 1935, and the use of special courts for such trials was abolished in 1948. In 2009, the Supreme Court of the United Kingdom became the new court of final appeal in the UK, (Note: Save where claimants make an application to the European Court of Human Rights (a distinct body not part of or related to the European Union); until 2021 matters of European Law directed to the European Court of Justice, but this ceased after the withdrawal of the United Kingdom from the European Union.) with the extant Law Lords becoming Supreme Court Justices and the appointment of new Law Lords ceasing. The adjudication of peerage claims by the House of Lords ceased in 2026.

As of 2026, Erskine May states that the House of Lords no longer has any judicial functions other than trying impeachments, a function Erskine May deems to have 'fallen into disuse'.

== History ==
Parliament's role in deciding litigation originated from the similar role of the Royal Court, where the king dispensed justice. Parliament grew out of the court and took on many of its roles. As lower courts were established, the House of Lords came to be the court of last resort in criminal and civil cases, except that in Scotland, the High Court of Justiciary remained the highest court in criminal matters (except for 1713–1781).

Parliament originally did not hear appeals as a court might; rather, it heard petitions for the judgments of lower courts to be reversed. The House of Commons ceased considering such petitions in 1399, leaving the House of Lords, effectively, as the nation's court of last resort. The Lords' jurisdiction later began to decline; only five cases were heard between 1514 and 1589, and no cases between 1589 and 1621. In 1621, the House of Lords resumed its judicial role when King James I sent the petition of Edward Ewer, a persistent litigant, to be considered by the House of Lords. Petitions for the House of Lords to review the decisions of lower courts began to increase once again. After Ewer, 13 further cases would be heard in 1621. The House of Lords appointed a Committee for Petitions. At first, the Clerk of the Parliaments would bring petitions to the house, and the whole house could decide if they should or should not be referred to the committee. As the number of petitions increased, the committee gained the power to reject petitions itself.

Petitions to the House of Lords did not have to seek reversal of lower court judgments; often, petitions were brought directly to the Lords without prior consideration in the inferior judiciary. The practice of bringing cases directly to the Lords, however, ended with the case of Thomas Skinner v East India Company. Skinner had established his business's trading base in Asia while few English restrictions on trade existed; later the base was seized by the Honourable East India Company which had been granted a monopoly. In 1667, the king, Charles II, referred the case to the Lords after failed attempts at arbitration.

Replying to Skinner's petition, the East India Company objected that the case was one of first instance, and that the Lords therefore should not have accepted it. Notwithstanding the company's protests, the House of Lords proceeded with the matter. Though lawyers argued that the House could intervene only after the lower courts had failed to remedy the case, the Lords decided in Skinner's favour in 1668. The East India Company then petitioned the House of Commons, arguing that the acceptance of a case in the first instance by the Lords was "unusual" and "extraordinary".

A famous dispute then broke out between the two houses; the Commons ordered the imprisonment of Thomas Skinner and the Lords retaliated by ordering the imprisonment of the company chairman. In 1670, Charles II requested both houses to abandon the case. When they refused, he ordered that all references to the case be expunged from the journals of both houses and that neither body continue with the dispute. The House of Lords then ceased to hear petitions in the first instance, considering them only after the lower courts had failed to remedy them.

Even afterwards the houses clashed over jurisdiction in 1675. The Commons felt that the upper house had breached its privileges by considering cases with members of the Commons as defendants. After the Lords considered one of these, Shirley v Fagg (see Sir John Fagg), the Commons warned them to "have regard for their Privileges". Soon the dispute became worse when two more such cases emerged. These included Thomas Dalmahoy and Arthur Onslow (grandfather of Arthur Onslow, the noted Speaker (1728–1761)). One case was from the Court of Chancery, and the other was from the equity branch of the Court of the Exchequer. The Commons unsuccessfully contended the Lords could hear petitions challenging decisions of common law courts but not those from courts of equity.

The dispute rested during prorogation commencing 1675. After the parliament reassembled in 1677, the cases involving members of the House of Commons were quietly dropped and neither House revisited the dispute.

In 1707, England united with Scotland to form the Kingdom of Great Britain. The question then arose as to whether or not appeals could be taken from Scottish Courts. The Acts of Union provided that "no causes in Scotland be cognoscible by the courts of Chancery, Queen's Bench, Common Pleas or any other court in Westminster Hall; and that the said courts or any other of the like nature after the union shall have no power to cognosce, review or alter the acts or sentences of judicatures in Scotland, or stop the execution of the same" (emphasis added). The acts were silent on appeals to the House of Lords, unless they be deemed of 'like nature' to Westminster Hall, in which case, such appeals were banned. In 1708, the first Scottish appeal to the Lords arrived, and it was accepted by the House. In 1709, the House ordered that no decree of the lower Scottish courts could be executed while an appeal was pending; that rule was reversed only by the Administration of Justice (Scotland) Act 1808 empowering the lower court to determine if an appeal justified the stay of its decree. In 1713, the House of Lords began to consider appeals from Scotland's highest criminal court, the High Court of Justiciary. In 1781, when deciding Bywater v Lord Advocate, the House recognised that before the Union, no further appeal lay. The House agreed not to hear further Scottish criminal appeals.

The Kingdom of Ireland was politically separate from Great Britain and subordinate to it. The Irish House of Lords regarded itself as the final court of appeal for Ireland, but the British Declaratory Act 1719 asserted the right of further appeal from the Irish Lords to the British Lords. This was odious to the Irish Patriot Party and was eventually repealed as part of the Constitution of 1782. Appellate jurisdiction for Ireland returned to Westminster when the Acts of Union 1800 abolished the Parliament of Ireland.

A 1627 lunacy inquisition judgment was appealed from Chancery to the Privy Council of England rather than the House of Lords. Bypassing the Lords was repeated at the next such appeal, in 1826 from the Irish Chancery.

== Appeals ==
=== Jurisdiction ===
The judicial business of the House of Lords was regulated by the Appellate Jurisdiction Act 1876. The Law Lords did not have the power to exercise judicial review over Acts of Parliament, and in general only important or particularly complex appeals came before the House of Lords. There was no further appeal from the House of Lords. However, in 1972 the United Kingdom signed the Treaty of Rome and became a member of the European Economic Community, and with this accepted European law to be supreme in certain areas, so long as Parliament does not explicitly override it (see the Factortame case). The doctrine of Parliamentary sovereignty still applied – under British constitutional law, Parliament could at any time have unilaterally decided to dismiss the supremacy of European law, but in common with other courts in the European Economic Community (which later became the European Union), the Law Lords referred points involving European law to the European Court of Justice. After 1998, the Lords could also declare a British law to be inconsistent with the European Convention on Human Rights pursuant to section 4 of the Human Rights Act 1998. Whilst this power was shared with the Court of Appeal, the High Court, the High Court of Justiciary, the Court of Session, and the Courts-Martial Appeal Court, such declarations were considered so important that the question would almost inevitably be determined in the House of Lords on appeal. However, the challenged law in question was not struck down, and the courts are required to enforce them; it remained up to Parliament to amend the law.

While the United Kingdom was subject to all European law, there was a further appeal from the House of Lords to the European courts (the European Court of Justice or the European Court of Human Rights), but then only in matters concerning either European Community law or the European Convention on Human Rights.

In civil cases, the House of Lords could hear appeals from the Court of Appeal of England and Wales, the Court of Appeal in Northern Ireland and the Scottish Court of Session. Alternatively, cases raising important legal points could leapfrog from the High Court of England and Wales or High Court in Northern Ireland. In England, Wales or Northern Ireland; leave (or permission) to appeal could be granted either by the court whose decision is appealed or the House of Lords itself. Leave to appeal is not a feature of the Scottish legal system and appeals proceeded when two Advocates certified the appeal as suitable.

In criminal cases, the House of Lords could hear appeals from the Court of Appeal of England and Wales, the High Court of England and Wales, the Court of Appeal in Northern Ireland, and the Courts-Martial Appeal Court, but did not hear appeals from the High Court of Justiciary in Scotland. In addition to obtaining leave to appeal, an appellant also had to obtain a certificate from the lower court stating that a point of general public importance was involved. The effect of this was that, in criminal matters, the House of Lords could not control its own docket.

=== Procedure ===
==== Selection of appeals ====
Permission to appeal could be granted by an Appeal Committee. The Committee consisted of three Lords of Appeal or Lords of Appeal in Ordinary. Appeal Committees normally convened fifteen to twenty times per year, and their members were selected by the Principal Clerk of the Judicial Office of the House of Lords. Appeal Committees could not meet while Parliament was prorogued or dissolved. Formerly, leave to appeal was unnecessary if two solicitors certified the reasonableness of the case. This procedure was abolished in English cases in 1934 and in Northern Irish cases in 1962; Scottish cases continued to come before the House of Lords in a similar manner.

As of 1982, the House of Lords had relatively little control of its caseload. About 80% of the civil caseload and 60% of the criminal caseload came to the House of Lords either by right or by leave of a lower court, rather than by leave of an Appeal Committee.

==== Hearing of appeals ====
An Appellate Committee, normally consisting of five Lords of Appeal in Ordinary or Lords of Appeal, heard the actual appeals. It was not a standing committee, and hence there was no one Appellate Committee; a separate Appellate Committee was formed to hear each appeal. There was no formal attempt to ensure that any of the Law Lords who had sat on the Appeal Committee which granted leave to hear the appeal would also sit on the Appellate Committee which heard the merits of the appeal; the overlap could be anywhere from zero to all three. The Lord Chancellor was technically responsible for the selection of membership of Appellate Committees, but delegated this duty to his Permanent Secretary, who then escalated only the hardest selection questions back to the Lord Chancellor. At the end of each legal term, the Permanent Secretary met with the Principal Clerk of the Judicial Office and the Judicial Clerk to the Privy Council to discuss the appeals coming to the House of Lords and the Privy Council. Then the Secretary would put together the Appellate Committees for the appeals to be heard in the upcoming term, while keeping in mind that the Law Lords would also be hearing Privy Council appeals.

The minimum number of Law Lords that could form an Appellate Committee was four. Seven Lords could sit in particularly important cases. On 4 October 2004 a Committee of nine Lords, including both the Senior Law Lord Lord Bingham of Cornhill and Second Senior Law Lord Lord Nicholls of Birkenhead, was convened to hear challenges to the indefinite detention of suspects under the Anti-terrorism, Crime and Security Act 2001, and on 16 December it announced an 8–1 ruling against the Government. Only five Appellate Committees ever comprised nine members. Three of these occurred after 2001.

The determination of each Appellate Committee was normally final, but the House of Lords (in common with the Court of Appeal and High Court of England and Wales) retained an inherent jurisdiction to reconsider any of its previous decisions; this includes the ability to vacate that decision and make a new one. It was exceptional for the House of Lords to exercise this power, but a number of important cases such as Dimes v Grand Junction Canal (a seminal case on bias in England and Wales) proceeded in this way.

A recent example of the House of Lords reconsidering an earlier decision occurred in 1999, when the judgment in the case on the extradition of Augusto Pinochet, the former President of Chile, was overturned on the grounds that one of the Lords on the committee, Lord Hoffmann, was a director of a charity closely allied with Amnesty International, which was a party to the appeal and had an interest to achieve a particular result. The matter was reheard by a panel of seven Lords of Appeal in Ordinary.

The tradition that appeals should be heard by Appellate Committees and not by the full House of Lords developed relatively late, after the Second World War. Historically, appeals were heard in the House of Lords Chamber by a full sitting of the House of Lords (although the Law Lords were doing the actual work). The Lords would sit for regular sessions after four in the evening, and the judicial sessions were held prior to that time. When the Commons Chamber was bombed in 1941, the Commons began to conduct their debates in the Lords Chamber, and the Lords moved into the King's Robing Room. After the war, the noise of postwar construction work rendered the Robing Room unusable. It was proposed in 1948, as a temporary measure, that the Lords should appoint an Appellate Committee small enough to sit in upstairs committee rooms to do the actual work of hearing appeals. The temporary measure later became a permanent one, and appeals continued to be heard in committee rooms.

A 1976 article in the American Bar Association Journal provides a snapshot of the Law Lords at work in a patent infringement case in 1975. The Law Lords sat from Monday to Thursday and its work day was divided into morning and afternoon sessions. On Mondays it sat from 11am to 1pm and 2pm to 4pm. The rest of the week the morning session began at 10:30am. No judicial robes were worn by the judges during hearings; they wore ordinary business suits. The five Lords of Appeal in Ordinary hearing the appeal were Lord Kilbrandon, Viscount Dilhorne, Lord Wilberforce, Lord Diplock and Lord Salmon. It took almost seven days to go through opening argument because counsel for the appellant was expected to read out loud all relevant portions of the Court of Appeal opinion and the trial court record (all of which had already been provided in advance to the Committee in hard copy format), while interpolating extensive comment and argument. Also during openings they could be asked to read out more by opposing counsel, and expect to be examined by the Committee members. Next, the respondent delivered their response and then the appellant delivered their rebuttal, again under examination from Committee members. As long as the appellant's opening had fairly summarized all relevant facts in the record (both favourable and adverse), as they were expected to do, these latter arguments were more closely focused on the law and the application of law to fact. The appellant submitted on the tenth day with the words, "My Lords, those are my submissions." On behalf of the House of Lords, Lord Wilberforce took the appeal under advisement, and an usher shouted, "Clear the bar!" The appeal had taken ten days over two and a half weeks and had originally been allotted 20 days over five weeks.

==== Delivery of judgment ====
Although each Appellate Committee was essentially acting as an appellate court, it could not issue judgments in its own name, but could only recommend to the House of Lords how to dispose of an appeal. This is why all the Law Lords framed their opinions in the form of recommendations (for example, "I would dismiss the appeal" or "I would allow the appeal"). In British constitutional theory, the Law Lords' opinions were originally intended to be individually delivered as speeches in debate before the full House of Lords, upon a motion to consider the committee's "report" on a particular appeal. The actual reading of full speeches before the House was abandoned in 1963, after which it became possible for a deceased Law Lord to give a speech.

Judgment was given in the main House of Lords Chamber during what was in theory a full sitting of the House to deal with judicial matters. These sittings were traditionally held at 10:30 a.m., while legislative and deliberative business was dealt with in the afternoons. The House of Lords' staff would notify counsel that judgment was imminent about five or six days before the relevant sitting, and provide advance copies of the committee's written report (the Lords' written speeches) and the House minutes (in plain English, a script of the pro forma questions to be raised and voted upon) to counsel when they arrived for the sitting. By the time the judicial functions of the House of Lords were abolished, the standard procedure was to hold such sittings at 9:45 a.m. on Wednesday mornings and to provide counsel with the Law Lords' speeches in advance on the preceding Friday.

Only the Law Lords on the relevant Appellate Committee spoke, but other Lords were free to attend, although they rarely did so. In plain English, the point of this "quaint ceremony" was that the Law Lords who had just heard the case as an Appellate Committee were reporting back to themselves, formally sitting as the House of Lords, and voting to adopt their own report on the matter. By the 1970s, the procedure had become such an arid formality that the same Law Lord who presided over the Appellate Committee also presided over the full sitting in which judgment was given. Thus, he would repeatedly move away from the Woolsack to make a motion in his capacity as a member of the Appellate Committee, and then move back to the Woolsack in his capacity as the presiding officer of the House of Lords to recite the traditional formula which meant that a majority had voted for the motion: "As many as are of that opinion will say 'Content', to the contrary, 'Not Content'. The contents have it."

After the abandonment of reading speeches in full, each Law Lord who had heard the appeal would rise only to acknowledge they "have had the advantage of reading the speech" (or speeches) prepared by the other Law Lords on the Appellate Committee, and to state they would allow the appeal or would dismiss the appeal for the reasons given in their own speech or in another Law Lord's speech. After all five members of the committee had spoken, the question was put to the House: "That the report from the Appellate Committee be agreed to." The House then voted on that question and on other questions related thereto; the decisions on these questions constituted the House's formal judgment. In theory, the full House was voting on the recommendations of the Appellate Committee, but by custom only the Law Lords on the Appellate Committee actually voted, while all other Lords (including all other Law Lords) always abstained.

If the House of Lords was in recess, the Lord Chancellor or Senior Lord of Appeal in Ordinary could recall the House to give judgment. Judicial sittings could occur while Parliament was prorogued, and, with the authorisation of the Sovereign, dissolved. In the latter case, the meeting was not of the full House, but was rather of the Law Lords acting in the name of the full House. Judgment could not be given between the summoning of a Parliament and the State Opening. No Parliamentary business is conducted during that time, except the taking of oaths of allegiance and the election of a Speaker by the House of Commons.

==== Related courts ====
The Judicial Committee of the Privy Council, which included the twelve Lords of Appeal in Ordinary (now the Justices of the Supreme Court) as well as other senior judges in the Privy Council, has little domestic jurisdiction. The Committee hears appeals from the appellate courts of many independent Commonwealth nations and crown dependencies. The Judicial Committee's domestic jurisdiction was very limited, hearing only cases on the competency of the devolved legislatures in Scotland, Northern Ireland, and Wales. Precedents set in devolution cases, but not in other matters, are binding on all other courts, which included the House of Lords. The 'devolution issues' were transferred from the Privy Council to the Supreme Court of the United Kingdom; however, the former continues to hear Commonwealth appeals.

== Trials of peers ==
In mediaeval times, feudal courts had jurisdiction only in their subjects; peers of the realm were subjects directly to the king, so could only be tried by what would become the House of Lords. The right of peers to be tried by peers, rather than directly by royal justice, was one ceded reluctantly from the Crown, and eventually only applied to treason and felony.

Peers of Scotland were granted the privilege of trial by the House after the union of 1707; peers of Ireland were, after the union of 1801, entitled to be elected to the Commons, but during such service their privileges, including the privilege of trial in the House of Lords, abated. Peeresses in their own right and wives or widows of peers were also entitled to trial in such a court, though they were never members of the House of Lords. Widows of peers who later married commoners lost the privilege.

=== Procedure ===
After a peer was indicted by the normal criminal process, the case was brought before the Court of King's/Queen's Bench. The judges of that court could not accept any plea of guilty or not guilty, except a plea that the crime in question was previously pardoned. If pardon was not pleaded, the court issued a writ of certiorari moving the indictment to the House of Lords. The Lord High Steward presided, but the entire House could decide all legal, factual or procedural disputes. At the end, the Lords then voted, starting with the most junior baron, and proceeding in order of precedence, ending with the Lord High Steward. Jurors vote on (after making) oath or affirmation; a lord voted (up)on his honour. Bishops could not be tried in the House, because they were not peers, but they could participate as judges in a trial, except in the verdict. If Parliament was not sitting the case would be referred to the Lord High Steward's Court. He as president was sole judge of questions of law or procedure, but a jury of Lords Triers determined the verdict. (He selected, at his discretion, any 23 or more peers to be Lords Triers.) A simple majority of votes was enough to convict, but this could not be less than 12. Since the Crown appointed the Lord High Steward, peers lamented that in what may well be a political persecution this procedure put the accused at great disadvantage (since the Crown could appoint a hostile Lord High Steward who could select hostile peers as Lords Triers), and in the late 17th century made repeated efforts to ameliorate this.

=== Abolition ===
A peer's trial for treason or felony in the House of Lords was as much an obligation as it was a privilege; from 1391 it could not be disclaimed in favour of a trial by jury. A peerage trial offered significant disadvantages over a jury trial. Whereas a commoner could, and can, challenge the members of his or her trial's jury, peers had no such right since all lords temporal participated in the verdict; furthermore, since the House was itself the highest court of the land, no appeals were possible from the decision except for royal pardon, in contrast to the criminal court system for commoners. Nor was there leniency for any convicted peer compared to a commoner convicted of the same sentence – the privilege of a peer to be excused for a first offence was abolished in 1841, and the Lords' decisions on punishment were constrained to those provided by law. In any event, the Lords relied almost exclusively on the advice tendered by royal justices, who were the same people presiding over standard criminal cases. The sole deliberation taken by the House for its final trial of a peer – that of Lord de Clifford for vehicular manslaughter in 1935 – was to ask for the attorney's opinion of the case before unanimously voting to acquit de Clifford based on it.

The practice's persistence was in large part because so few trials occurred after the Glorious Revolution – only two in the 20th century. By the late 1930s, the opinion of the House had turned solidly against continuing the privilege; the majority in favour of its abolition were largely holders of newly created privileges resenting the inconvenience it caused accused peers, whereas the minority who still supported it were those holding old peerages who saw it as a privilege of the House as a whole. In 1936, a year after the de Clifford trial, the Lords voted to abolish the privilege but the legislation was not given time in the Commons by the government before the session ended.

In 1948, the First Attlee ministry introduced the Criminal Justice Act 1948 to abolish penal servitude. While the bill was in the Lords, Viscount Simon added an amendment to abolish the trial of peers by the House of Lords, which was agreed to in both houses and became law.

=== In popular culture ===
The novel Clouds of Witness (1926) by Dorothy L. Sayers depicts in the House of Lords the fictional trial of a duke who is accused of murder. Sayers researched and used the then current trial procedures. Kind Hearts and Coronets (1949) comedy from Ealing Studios features an almost identical scene.

== Impeachment ==
=== Theoretical device of impeachment ===
The UK constitutional institutions since early Victorian Britain have been careful to uphold a Diceyan emphasis on separation of powers (finalised with the Lord Chancellor's ending of his judicial office by the Constitutional Reform Act 2005, after being thwarted by a change of government in the 1870s). The Lords legally has power to try impeachments after the House of Commons agrees and words "Articles of Impeachment", which it forwards.

=== Mechanism of impeachment ===
Originally, the Lords held that it applied only to peers and only for certain crimes. In 1681 the Commons passed a resolution that it may forward articles against anyone for any crime. The Lords tries/tried impeachment by simple majority. When the Commons demand judgment, the Lords may proceed to pronounce the sentence against the accused. The Commons may refuse to press for judgment whereupon the accused, convicted, faces no punishment.

The accused could not, under the Act of Settlement 1701, obtain and plead a pardon to avoid trial in the House of Lords; but could if liable to trial before the lesser courts. Any convict could be pardoned (absolutely) by the Sovereign. In Britain the House of Lords trials were in direct substitution of regular trial; they could impose the same sentences, and the Sovereign could pardon the convict like any other. This combined jurisdiction differs from many other nations. For instance, in the United States, impeachment serves only as a mechanism for removing officials in the executive and judicial branches; the Senate can only remove the accused from office and optionally bar them from future offices of public trust or honour, the President may not issue pardons in cases of impeachment, and an impeached officeholder remains liable to subsequent trial and punishment in the ordinary courts.

=== Incidence ===
Impeachment was originally used to try those who were too powerful to come before the ordinary courts. During the reign of the Lancastrians, impeachments were very frequent, but they reduced under the Tudors, when bills of attainder became the preferred method. During the reign of the Stuarts, impeachment was revived; Parliament used it as a tool against the king's ministers during a time when it felt it needed to resist the tyranny of the Crown. The last impeachment trials were the impeachment of Warren Hastings from 1788 to 1795 and the impeachment of Viscount Melville in 1806.

== Peerage claims ==
=== Former procedure ===
Such claims and disputes were in early centuries a matter for the monarch alone; the 2019 edition of Erskine May stated that 'the House is regarded as guardian of its own privileges and membership'. Theoretically, the Crown, as fount of honour, is entitled to decide all questions relating to such disputes. In practice such decisions were made where disputed only after full reference to the House of Lords.

Between the taking effect of the House of Lords Act 1999 and 2026, the House of Lords was able to declare the law on matters of peerage

- by reference from the Crown (with whom the power at root resides, arranged by the Lord Chancellor considering all such regular claims via the Crown Office);
- in any petition to enter the register for by-elections (those with a view to entering the House);

where the Lord Chancellor had recommended it was proper to be considered by the Committee for Privileges and Conduct. Once the latter reported to the House, the House usually issued a concurring resolution which was reported to the Crown which by custom confirmed the decision by directing entries on the Roll of Peerage. Each decision was deemed to turn on its own facts and was not of binding precedent value for other cases.

=== Abolition ===
The House of Lords (Hereditary Peers) Act 2026 abolished the House of Lords' jurisdiction to adjudicate peerage claims, effective 29 April 2026.

== Constitution of the Lords ==
=== Appeals ===
At first, all members of the House of Lords could hear appeals. The role of lay members of the House in judicial sittings faded in the early nineteenth century. Soon, only "Law Lords"—the Lord Chancellor and Lords who held judicial office—came to hear appeals. The last time that lay members voted on a case was in 1834. The Lords later came close to breaching this convention a decade later, when the House was considering the case of Daniel O'Connell, an Irish politician. A panel of Law Lords—the Lord Chancellor, three former Lord Chancellors, a former Lord Chancellor of Ireland and a former Lord Chief Justice—opined on the matter. Immediately thereafter, lay members began to make speeches about the controversial case. The Lord President of the Privy Council then advised that lay members should not intervene after the Law Lords had announced their opinions. The last time a lay peer attempted to intervene was in 1883; in that case, the Lord's vote was ignored.

No provision stood whereby the number of Law Lords could be regulated. In 1856, it was desired to increase their number by creating a life peerage. The House, however, ruled that the recipient, Sir James Parke, was not entitled thereby to sit as a Lord of Parliament.

Under the Appellate Jurisdiction Act 1876, the Sovereign nominated a number of Lords of Appeal in Ordinary to sit in the House of Lords. In practice, they were appointed on the advice of the Prime Minister (they were not covered by the Judicial Appointments Commission established in 2006). Only lawyers who had held high judicial office for a minimum of two years or barristers who had been practising for fifteen years were to be appointed Lords of Appeal in Ordinary. By convention, at least two were Scottish and at least one from Northern Ireland.

Lords of Appeal in Ordinary held the rank of Baron and seats in the House for life. Under the Judicial Pensions and Retirement Act 1993 they ceased to be such at 70, but could be permitted by ministerial discretion to hold office as old as 75. The Act provided for appointment of only two Lords of Appeal in Ordinary, but as of 2009 twelve could be appointed; this number could have been further raised by a Statutory Instrument approved by both Houses of Parliament. They were, by custom, appointed to the Privy Council if not already members. They served on the Judicial Committee of the Privy Council, highest court of appeal in certain cases such as from some Commonwealth countries. They were often called upon to chair important public inquiries, such as the Hutton inquiry.

Two of the Lords of Appeal in Ordinary were designated the Senior and Second Senior of their type. Formerly, the most senior of the Law Lords took these posts. Since 1984, however, the Senior and Second Senior Lords were appointed independently.

Lords of Appeal in Ordinary were joined by Lords of Appeal. These were lawyers who are already members of the House under other Acts (including the Life Peerages Act 1958 and the House of Lords Act 1999) who held or had held high judicial office. High judicial officers included judges of the Court of Appeal of England and Wales, the Inner House of the Court of Session and the Court of Appeal in Northern Ireland. Additionally, a Lord of Appeal in Ordinary who had reached the age of seventy could become a Lord of Appeal. Between 1996 and 2001, Lord Cooke of Thorndon, a retired judge of an overseas appellate court (the Court of Appeal of New Zealand), served as a Lord of Appeal.

Judicial appeals were heard by Lords of Appeal in Ordinary and Lords of Appeal under the age of seventy-five. Lords of Appeal in Ordinary were entitled to emoluments. Thus, Lords of Appeal in Ordinary ceased to be paid at the time they ceased to hold office and became Lords of Appeal. The Senior Lord of Appeal in Ordinary received £185,705 as of 2009 (the Lord Chief Justice of England and Wales was the only judicial figure who received a higher salary). The other Lords of Appeal in Ordinary received £179,431.

By convention, only the Lords of Appeal in Ordinary and Lords of Appeal participated in judicial matters. When the House gave judgment, the regular quorum of three applied, but these had to be Law Lords. Normally, only the Law Lords on the Appellate Committee who were deciding the case voted when the House gave judgment.

=== Trials ===
The Lord High Steward presided over the House of Lords in trials of peers, and also in impeachment trials when a peer was tried for high treason; otherwise, the Lord High Chancellor presided. The post of Lord High Steward was originally hereditary, held by the Earls of Leicester. After the rebellion of one of the Lord High Stewards, the position was forfeited and re-granted to Edmund Crouchback, but it later merged in the Crown. The position was created again, but its holder died without heirs in 1421, and the post has since been left vacant. Whenever a Lord High Steward became necessary—at certain trials and at coronation—one was appointed for the occasion only. Once the trial or coronation concluded, the Lord High Steward would break his white staff of office, thereby symbolising the end of his service in that position. Often, when a Lord High Steward was necessary for trials of peers, the Lord Chancellor was appointed to the post.

The Lord High Steward merely presided at trials, and the whole House could vote. The position of the Lords Spiritual (the Archbishops and Bishops of the Church of England with seats in the House), however, was unclear. The Lords Spiritual, though members of the House, were not considered "ennobled in blood" like the temporal peers. Though they retained the right to vote in both trials of peers and impeachment trials, it was customary for them to withdraw from the chamber immediately before the House pronounced judgment. This convention was followed only before the final vote on guilt and not on procedural questions arising during the trial.

When the House was not officially in session, trials were heard by the Court of the Lord High Steward.

=== Peerage claims ===
If the claim was a difficult one, or if the Lord Chancellor was not satisfied that the claimant had established a right to succession, the matter was referred to the Lords, which then referred it to its committee. In hearing such claims it sat with three current holders of high judicial office, who were granted the same speaking and voting rights as members of the committee.

== Reform ==
In 1873, the Government introduced a bill to abolish the judicial role of the House of Lords Judicial Committee in English cases (Scottish and Irish appeals were to be preserved). The bill passed, and was to come into force in November 1874. Before that date, however, the Liberal Government of William Ewart Gladstone fell. The new Conservative Government, led by Benjamin Disraeli, passed a bill to postpone the coming-into-force of the bill until 1875. By then, however, the sentiments of the Parliament had changed. The relevant provisions of the bill were repealed, and the jurisdiction of the House of Lords came to be regulated under the Appellate Jurisdiction Act 1876.

Concerns were chiefly around the Lord Chancellor, able and prone to sit in judicial and legislative/executive bodies (judicial committee and house). The other Law Lords would not participate in the latter. In the final 42 years of such office holder's possible participation in judicial sittings this was for a minority of their sessions:

Name and date	days sat in Judicial Committee
Lord Gardiner (Lord Chancellor from 1965 to 1970)	4 days
Lord Hailsham of St Marylebone (1970 to 1974 and 1979 to 1987)	81 days
Lord Elwyn-Jones (1974 to 1979)	8 days
Lord Havers (1987)	0 days (never)
Lord Mackay of Clashfern (1987 to 1997)	60 days
Lord Irvine of Lairg (1997 to 2003)	18 days
Lord Falconer of Thoroton (2003 to 2007)	0 days (never)

Lord Chancellors tended to recuse themselves (not sit) when the Government had a stake in the outcome; during a debate in the Lords, Lord Irvine said, "I am unwilling to lay down any detailed rules because it is ever a question of judgment combined with a need to ensure that no party to an appeal could reasonably believe or suspect that the Lord Chancellor might, because of his other roles, have an interest in a specific outcome. Examples might be where the lawfulness of a decision or action by any Minister or department might be at issue." Under the Constitutional Reform Act 2005 the Lord Chancellor is no longer a judge.

Part 3 of the Constitutional Reform Act 2005, which came into force on 1 October 2009, abolished the appellate jurisdiction of the House of Lords, and transferred it to a new body, the Supreme Court of the United Kingdom. Among the initial Justices of the Supreme Court were ten of the twelve then existing Lords of Appeal in Ordinary (Law Lords). One of the Law Lords (Lord Scott of Foscote) had retired on 30 September 2009 and the 12th, Lord Neuberger of Abbotsbury, became the Master of the Rolls (one of two sub-head judges, that for civil justice, in England and Wales). The 11th place on the Supreme Court was filled by Lord Clarke (previously the Master of the Rolls), a member of the House of Lords who was the first Justice to be appointed directly to the Supreme Court. The 12th place was initially vacant. Formally addressed as (customarily styled) "My Lord" or "My Lady", later appointees are not elevated to the House of Lords.

== See also ==
- List of law life peerages
- List of Lords of Appeal
- List of House of Lords cases
