= Andrew Hardie, Baron Hardie =

Scottish judge (born 1946)

The Right Honourable The Lord Hardie PC
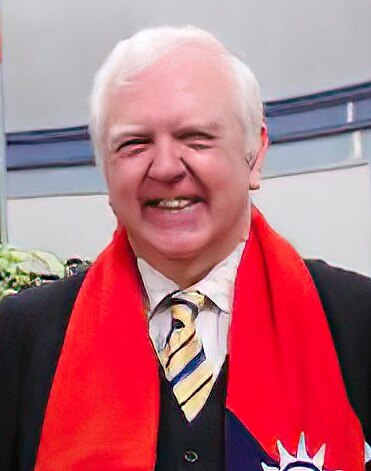

Senator of the College of Justice
- In office March 2000 – 31 December 2012
- Nominated by: Donald Dewar
- Appointed by: Elizabeth II

Lord Advocate
- In office 1997–2000
- Monarch: Elizabeth II
- First Minister: Donald Dewar
- Preceded by: Lord Mackay of Drumadoon
- Succeeded by: Lord Boyd of Duncansby

Member of the House of Lords
- Lord Temporal
- Life peerage 21 May 1997

Personal details
- Born: Andrew Rutherford Hardie; 8 January 1946 (age 80) Alloa
- Party: Labour
- Education: University of Edinburgh
- Profession: Advocate

Andrew Rutherford Hardie, Baron Hardie, PC (born 8 January 1946) is a former Senator of the College of Justice, a judge of the Supreme Courts of Scotland, and a former Lord Advocate, the country's senior Law Officer. He led the prosecution team in the preparation of the original Lockerbie bombing trial, but resigned as Lord Advocate shortly before the trial commenced in 2000.

== Early life ==
Born in Alloa, Hardie was educated at St Modan's High School, Stirling and at the University of Edinburgh (M.A., LL.B.). He was admitted as a solicitor in 1971 and to the Faculty of Advocates in 1973. He served as an Advocate Depute from 1979 to 1983, and was appointed Queen's Counsel in 1985. He was Treasurer of the Faculty of Advocates from 1989 until he was elected Dean of the Faculty from 1994 to 1997. From 1991 to 1994 he sat as a part-time Chairman of the Medical Appeals Tribunal.

== Lord Advocate ==
Following Labour's 1997 election victory, Hardie was appointed Lord Advocate, and created a life peer, as Baron Hardie, of Blackford in the City of Edinburgh, and appointed to the Privy Council. As well as serving as the country's top prosecutor, he played an active role in the House of Lords, including acting as a Government spokesman during the passage of the Scotland Act 1998. Under the terms of this Act, the Lord Advocate became a member of the new Scottish Executive, with his duties to the UK Government passing to the newly created office of Advocate General for Scotland. The first Scottish Parliament was elected in 1999, at which time Hardie became a member of the Scottish Executive.

=== Lockerbie trial ===
On Wednesday 21 December 1988, Pan Am Flight 103 from London to New York was blown up over the Scottish town of Lockerbie, killing two hundred and seventy people. In 1991, two Libyan men were indicted for the bombing, but their trial did not begin until May 2000. The trial itself was held in a special sitting of the High Court of Justiciary, sitting as the Scottish Court in the Netherlands, at Camp Zeist, a former US Air Force base in Utrecht, Netherlands. Hardie took over as Lord Advocate shortly before arrangements for the trial were agreed, and it was intended he would lead the prosecution team, however he resigned as Lord Advocate in March 2000, two months before the trial was scheduled to begin, and was forced to defend himself against accusations of having 'abandoned' the victims' families. He was succeeded as Lord Advocate by the Solicitor General, Colin Boyd.

== The Bench ==
Lord Hardie was appointed a Judge of the Court of Session and High Court of Justiciary in March 2000. In 2008, a review of judicial performance named him as "Scotland's worst judge". The figures showed that eighty-four sentences imposed by Hardie had been overturned on appeal, all having been reduced, while two convictions were overturned, although both these convictions arose from the one case, in which it was found Hardie had misdirected the jury on a point of law.

Hardie was appointed to the Inner House of the Court of Session in 2010 and retired on 31 December 2012.

== The Tram Inquiry ==
Lord Hardie was appointed as chair of The Tram Inquiry. Lord Hardie's probe has now lasted longer than the Chilcot inquiry into the Iraq war.

== Concealing child abuse ==
The father of two children molested by John Watt QC told a court during the trial of Watt that he told Lord Hardie about the abuse while Hardie was Watt's devilmaster. Lord Hardie did not go to the police to report this child abuse. Watt was convicted in 2022 of assaults on four children including rape. The mother of one of the children said: "If anyone learns that a colleague has abused a child, they should go to the police, no question. Anyone who touches a child in a sexual manner is a danger to all children. If that is where their interests lie, they will do anything to be alone with children". "It is hard to understand how someone who would be dean responsible for the conduct of advocates, the lord advocate, responsible for prosecution, and a High Court judge could fail to do what needed to be done".

== Arms ==
Coat of arms of Andrew Hardie, Baron Hardie
Crest A sheep rampant Proper holding in its forefeet a garland composed of dexter hops and sinister barley all Or. Escutcheon Gules two spur rowels of five points in chief and a balance in base Argent. Supporters Dexter a male figure attired in the robes of the Lord Advocate Proper sinister a lion rampant Sable armed langued and queued Gules wearing a collar Or from which is pendent a castle triple-towered and embattled Sable masoned and windowed Argent portcullis shut Gules. Motto Fortiter Fideliter Feliciter

== See also ==
- List of Senators of the College of Justice
- List of Scottish Executive Ministerial Teams
- List of Life Peerages

Legal offices
Preceded by Lord Mackay of Drumadoon	Lord Advocate; 1997–2000	Succeeded by Colin Boyd
Orders of precedence in the United Kingdom
Preceded by The Lord Simon of Highbury	Gentlemen; Baron Hardie	Followed by The Lord Jopling
