= William Cullen, Baron Cullen of Whitekirk =

Scottish jurist and advocate

The Right Honourable The Lord Cullen of Whitekirk KT PC FRSE HonFREng
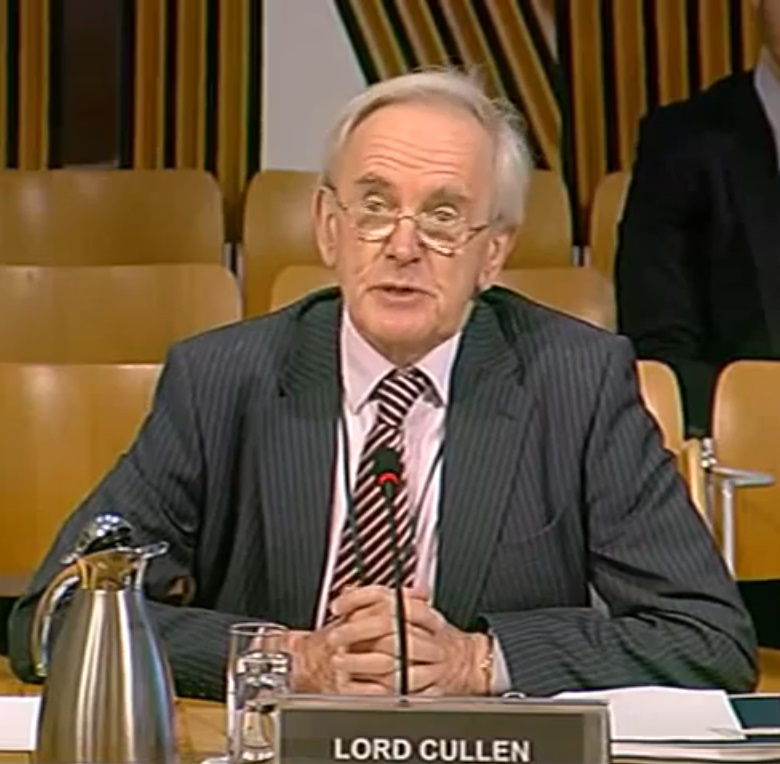
- Cullen in 2015

Member of the House of Lords
- Lord Temporal
- Life peerage 17 June 2003 – 1 February 2019

Lord Justice General and Lord President of the Court of Session
- In office 2002–2005
- Monarch: Elizabeth II
- Preceded by: Lord Rodger
- Succeeded by: Lord Hamilton

Lord Justice Clerk
- In office 1997–2002
- Preceded by: Lord Ross
- Succeeded by: Lord Gill

Personal details
- Born: William Douglas Cullen; 18 November 1935 (age 90)
- Spouse: Rosamond Mary Downer
- Education: University of St Andrews, University of Edinburgh
- Profession: Advocate

William Douglas Cullen, Baron Cullen of Whitekirk (born 18 November 1935) is a former senior member of the Scottish judiciary. He formerly served as Lord Justice General and Lord President of the Court of Session, and was an additional Lord of Appeal in the House of Lords prior to the transfer of its judicial functions to the Supreme Court.

== Early life ==
William Douglas Cullen was educated at the High School of Dundee and the universities of St Andrews and Edinburgh. He was admitted to the Faculty of Advocates in 1962 and was Standing Junior Counsel to Her Majesty's Customs and Excise from 1970 to 1973. He was appointed Queen's Counsel in 1973 and served as an Advocate Depute from 1978 to 1981. From 1984 to 1986 Cullen served as chairperson of the influential Edinburgh conservationist group the Cockburn Association.

== Judicial career ==
Lord Cullen was a chairman of the Medical Appeal Tribunals from 1977 until his appointment as a judge in 1985. He was appointed a Senator of the College of Justice, a judge of the High Court of Justiciary and Court of Session, as Lord Cullen. From 1988 to 1990 he conducted the Public Inquiry into the Piper Alpha disaster and in 1996 he chaired the Public Inquiry into the shootings at Dunblane Primary School. In October 1999 he was appointed to chair the Ladbroke Grove Rail Inquiry. He was Lord Justice Clerk and president of the Second Division of the Inner House from 1997 to 2002, when he was appointed Lord Justice General and Lord President of the Court of Session.

In March 2002, Lord Cullen led the 5-judge tribunal at the Scottish Court in the Netherlands which heard the failed appeal of Abdelbaset al-Megrahi against his conviction for the 1988 Lockerbie bombing of Pan Am Flight 103.

On 15 July 2005, Lord Cullen announced his intention to retire in November 2005. On 24 November the Scottish Executive announced that Arthur Hamilton, Lord Hamilton, a member of the Inner House of the Court of Session, would succeed him as the new Lord Justice General and Lord President of the Court of Session.

== Honours ==
On 17 June 2003, Cullen was created a life peer, as Baron Cullen of Whitekirk, of Whitekirk in East Lothian. He sat as a crossbench member of the House of Lords until his retirement in 2019. He was also one of five additional Lords of Appeal in the House of Lords. On 25 June 2005, he was elected president of the Saltire Society, replacing Stewart Sutherland, Baron Sutherland of Houndwood On 30 November 2007 it was announced that Lord Cullen would be appointed a Knight of the Thistle. He was knighted by Queen Elizabeth II at a ceremony in Edinburgh on 2 July 2008. On 4 September 2009 he was also formally installed as chancellor of Abertay University in Dundee, a position he held for a decade. In 1995 he was elected an Honorary Fellow of the Royal Academy of Engineering

Cullen also received an Honorary Doctorate from Heriot-Watt University in 1995

He was sworn in as a Member of the Privy Council of the United Kingdom in 1997.

Coat of arms of William Cullen, Baron Cullen of Whitekirk
Crest Between two branches of larch a dexter arm couped at the elbow Proper the hand holding a pair of balances Or. Escutcheon Per fess Vert and Azure on a fess Argent between in chief a church and in base a close helmet of the third an Irish five-barred gate Sable stone posts of the third fimbriated of the fourth between two sprigs of holly Proper. Supporters Two Roe Deer Proper. Motto Ruris Honorum Opulenta

Legal offices
Preceded by Lord Ross	Lord Justice Clerk; 1997–2002	Succeeded by Lord Gill
Preceded by Lord Rodger	Lord Justice General and Lord President of the Court of Session; 2002–2005	Succeeded by Lord Hamilton
Academic offices
Preceded by David Ogilvy, 13th Earl of Airlie	Chancellor of the University of Abertay Dundee; 2009–2019	Succeeded by Alice Brown
Orders of precedence in the United Kingdom
Preceded by The Lord Wilson of Dinton	Gentlemen; Baron Cullen of Whitekirk	Followed by The Lord Drayson
