= Alan Rodger, Baron Rodger of Earlsferry =

Scottish judge (1944–2011)

The Right Honourable The Lord Rodger of Earlsferry PC FBA FRSE

Justice of the Supreme Court of the United Kingdom (Note: Lord of Appeal in Ordinary until 30 September 2009)
- In office 1 October 2001 – 26 June 2011
- Nominated by: Jack Straw
- Appointed by: Elizabeth II
- Preceded by: The Lord Clyde
- Succeeded by: Lord Reed

Lord Justice General and Lord President of the Court of Session
- In office 1 October 1996 – 13 November 2002
- Preceded by: The Lord Hope of Craighead
- Succeeded by: The Lord Cullen of Whitekirk

Lord Advocate
- In office 15 April 1992 – 7 November 1995
- Prime Minister: John Major
- Preceded by: The Lord Fraser of Carmyllie
- Succeeded by: The Lord Mackay of Drumadoon

Solicitor General for Scotland
- In office 14 January 1989 – 15 April 1992
- Prime Minister: Margaret Thatcher; John Major
- Preceded by: Peter Fraser
- Succeeded by: Donald Mackay

Member of the House of Lords
- Lord Temporal
- Life peerage 29 April 1992 – 26 June 2011

Personal details
- Born: Alan Ferguson Rodger; 18 September 1944 Glasgow, Scotland
- Died: 26 June 2011 (aged 66) Clydebank, Scotland
- Relations: Ferguson Rodger (father)
- Education: University of Glasgow; New College, Oxford
- Occupation: Judge
- Profession: Advocate

Alan Ferguson Rodger, Baron Rodger of Earlsferry PC, FBA, FRSE (18 September 1944 – 26 June 2011) was a Scottish academic, lawyer, and Justice of the Supreme Court of the United Kingdom.

He served as Lord Advocate, the senior Law Officer of Scotland, before becoming Lord Justice General and Lord President of the Court of Session, the head of the country's judiciary. He was then appointed a Lord of Appeal in Ordinary (Law Lord) and became a Justice of the Supreme Court when the judicial functions of the House of Lords were transferred to that Court.

== Early life and career ==
Alan Rodger was born on 18 September 1944 in Glasgow, to Professor T Ferguson Rodger, Professor of Psychological Medicine at the University of Glasgow, and Jean Margaret Smith Chalmers, and educated at the private Kelvinside Academy in the city. He studied at the University of Glasgow, graduating with an MA, and at the University's School of Law, taking an LLB. He then studied at New College, Oxford—under David Daube, Regius Professor of Civil Law—where he graduated with an MA (by decree) and DPhil, and was Dyke Junior Research Fellow at Balliol College, Oxford, from 1969 to 1970 and a Fellow of New College from 1970 to 1972.

He became an advocate in 1974 and was Clerk of the Faculty of Advocates from 1976 to 1979. He was a Member of the Mental Welfare Commission for Scotland from 1981 to 1984, and was appointed Queen's Counsel in 1985. He was an Advocate Depute from 1985 to 1988 and was appointed Solicitor General for Scotland in 1989, being promoted to Lord Advocate in 1992, and was created a life peer as Baron Rodger of Earlsferry, of Earlsferry in the District of North East Fife on 29 April 1992, and was appointed to the Privy Council.

== Judicial career ==
Rodger was appointed a Senator of the College of Justice, a judge of the High Court of Justiciary and Court of Session, in 1995, He became Lord Justice General and Lord President in 1996. He was appointed a Lord of Appeal in Ordinary in 2001, upon the retirement of Lord Clyde, in which capacity his Judicial Assistants included Charles Banner. He and nine other Lords of Appeal in Ordinary became Justices of the Supreme Court upon that body's inauguration on 1 October 2009.

== Death ==
Lord Rodger of Earlsferry died from a brain tumour at a hospice in Clydebank on 26 June 2011, at the age of 66. Scottish First Minister Alex Salmond, who provoked fury after criticising Rodger less than a month earlier, said he had made an "outstanding contribution" to Scottish public life.

== Honours ==
Lord Rodger of Earlsferry was elected a Fellow of the British Academy in 1991, and the same year was the Maccabaean Lecturer at the Academy. He was appointed a Fellow of the Royal Society of Edinburgh, an Honorary Bencher at Lincoln's Inn in 1992, and an Honorary Bencher of the Inn of Court of Northern Ireland in 1998. He was appointed an Honorary Member of SPTL, subsequently SLS in 1992 and a Corresponding Member of Bayerische Akademy der Wissenschaften in 2001. He was President of the Holdsworth Club in 1998–99 and made an Honorary Fellow of the American College of Trial Lawyers in 2008. He received honorary degrees of Doctor of Laws (LLD) from the Universities of Glasgow (1995), Aberdeen (1999) and Edinburgh (2001).

Lord Rodger of Earlsferry had been the Visitor of St Hugh's College, Oxford, since 2003, High Steward of the University of Oxford since 2008, and an Honorary Professor at the University of Glasgow School of Law since July 2009.

== Notable judgements ==
As Lord Justice General

- Drury v Her Majesty's Advocate 2001 SCCR 583 – definition of murder in Scotland

As Justice of the Supreme Court

- R (E) v Governing Body of JFS [2009] UKSC 15 – racial discrimination in religious school admissions (dissenting)
- HJ and HT v Home Secretary [2010] UKSC 31 – homosexuality in asylum claims

== Notes ==
Legal offices
Preceded by Lord Fraser of Carmyllie	Solicitor General for Scotland; 1989–1992	Succeeded by Lord Dawson
Preceded by Lord Fraser of Carmyllie	Lord Advocate; 1992–1995	Succeeded by Lord Mackay of Drumadoon
Preceded by Lord Hope of Craighead	Lord President of the Court of Session and Lord Justice General; 1996–2002	Succeeded by Lord Cullen of Whitekirk
Academic offices
Preceded by Lord Bingham of Cornhill	High Steward of the University of Oxford; 2008–2011	Vacant
