= Catherine Smith, Baroness Smith of Cluny =

Scottish lawyer (born 1973)

The Right Honourable The Baroness Smith of Cluny KC
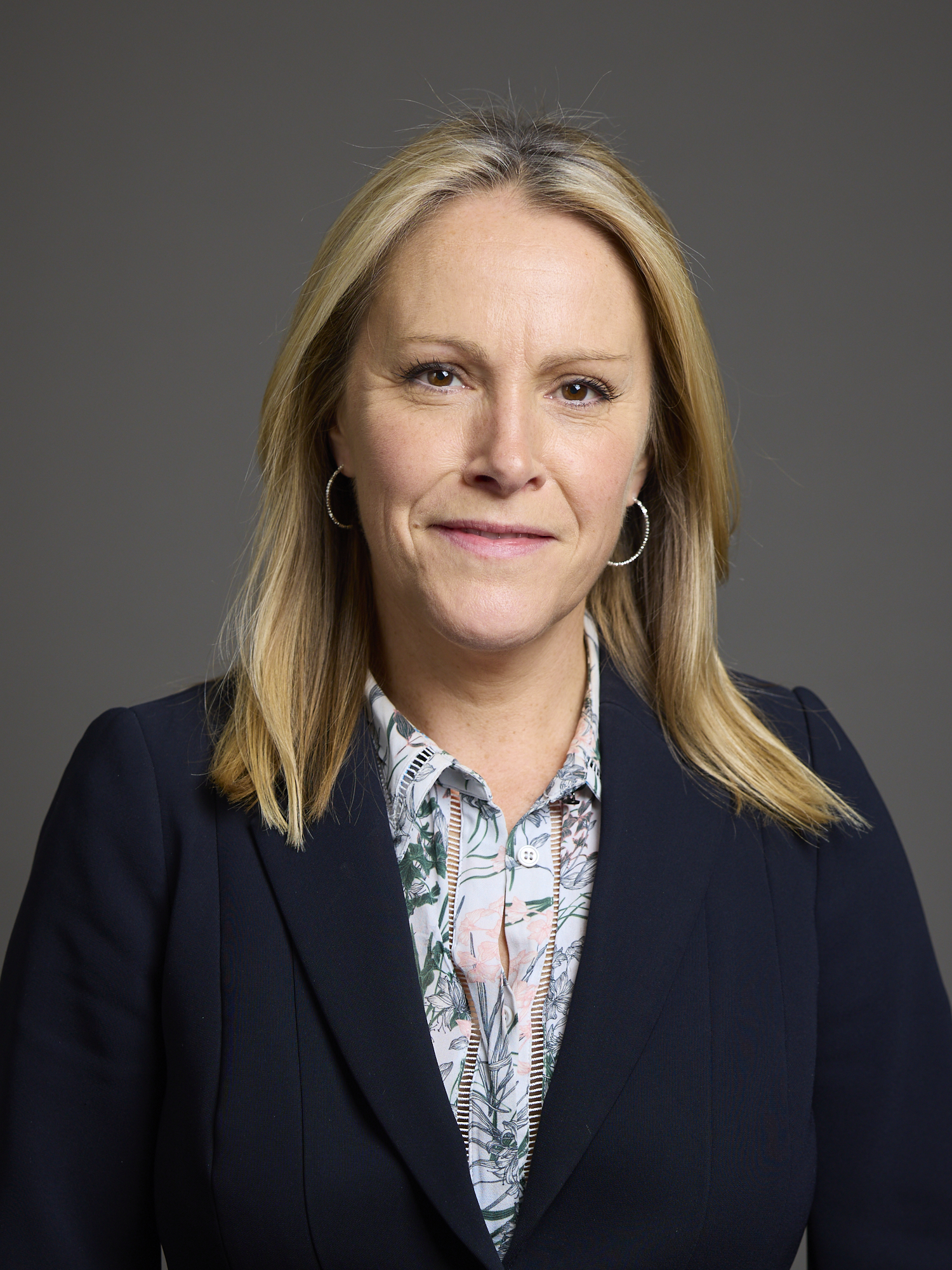
- Official portrait, 2024

Advocate General for Scotland
- Incumbent
- Assumed office 29 August 2024
- Prime Minister: Keir Starmer; Andy Burnham
- Preceded by: The Lord Stewart of Dirleton

Member of the House of Lords
- Lord Temporal
- Life peerage 9 October 2024

Personal details
- Born: Catherine Anne Smith; 4 May 1973 (age 53) Edinburgh, Scotland
- Party: Labour
- Parents: John Smith (father); Elizabeth Bennett (mother)
- Relatives: Sarah Smith (sister)
- Education: University of Glasgow (MA, LLB); University of Strathclyde (DipLP)

Catherine Anne Smith, Baroness Smith of Cluny, KC (born 4 May 1973), is a Scottish lawyer and life peer who has served as Advocate General for Scotland since 2024. She is the youngest daughter of former Labour Party leader John Smith.

== Early life and education ==
Catherine Anne Smith was born on 4 May 1973 in Edinburgh as the youngest of three daughters. Her father, John Smith, was at that time the member of Parliament for North Lanarkshire, and later served as the leader of the Labour Party from 1992 until his death in 1994. Her mother, Elizabeth Smith (née Bennett), was made a life peer and appointed to the House of Lords as Baroness Smith of Gilmorehill in 1995. Her elder sister, Sarah Smith, is a BBC journalist.

Smith was educated at Boroughmuir High School in Edinburgh. She studied history and law at the University of Glasgow, gaining Master of Arts (MA) and Bachelor of Laws (LLB) degrees, followed by a Diploma in Legal Practice (DipLP) from the University of Strathclyde.

== Career ==
After working as a paralegal in Sydney, Smith was a solicitor in Glasgow and Oban from 1999 to 2004. She was called to the bar as a member of the Faculty of Advocates in 2007, and was appointed Queen's Counsel in 2021. Smith has sat as a part-time sheriff since 2022. She has primarily worked in reparation and public law, specialising in cases involving personal injury, clinical negligence and judicial review. Prior to her appointment as Advocate General for Scotland in 2024, she was a member of Compass Chambers.

Smith was a founding member of Justice Scotland, an arm of the London-based non-governmental organisation Justice, which promotes law reform and human rights, and served as its vice chair from 2012 to 2022. She served as counsel to the Investigatory Powers Tribunal. Between 2012 and 2021, she was Standing Junior Counsel to the Advocate General, serving under Lord Wallace of Tankerness, Lord Keen of Elie and Lord Stewart of Dirleton. Smith was appointed to the panel of counsel to the Equality and Human Rights Commission in 2015, and has been an advocate member of the Scottish Civil Justice Council since 2020.

Smith co-founded and has chaired the John Smith Centre for Public Service at the University of Glasgow since 2014. As a trustee of the John Smith Trust since 2005, she visited Kyiv and Warsaw in 2023 to support rule-of-law and human-rights projects.

=== Advocate General for Scotland ===
On 29 August 2024, Smith was appointed Advocate General for Scotland, a law officer of the Crown who advises the British government on Scots law on reserved matters only. Her appointment marked the first time that all three Scottish law officers were women, alongside Dorothy Bain (Lord Advocate) and Ruth Charteris (Solicitor General for Scotland).

Smith was created a life peer as Baroness Smith of Cluny, of Cluny in the City of Edinburgh, on 9 October to allow her to sit in the House of Lords.

In July 2026, she was reappointed to the new government as HM Advocate General for Scotland by Andy Burnham.

Legal offices
Preceded by The Lord Stewart of Dirleton	Advocate General for Scotland; 2024–present	Incumbent
