= Lady Clark =

Lady Clark may refer to:

- Lynda Clark, Baroness Clark of Calton, Scottish judge and Labour MP
- Katy Clark, Baroness Clark of Kilwinning, British Labour politician
- Rosemary (née Adam), wife of Tony Clarke, Baron Clarke of Stone-cum-Ebony

== See also ==
- Lord Clark (disambiguation)
