= Elizabeth Smith, Baroness Smith of Gilmorehill =

British politician and arts patron (born 1940)

The Right Honourable The Baroness Smith of Gilmorehill DL
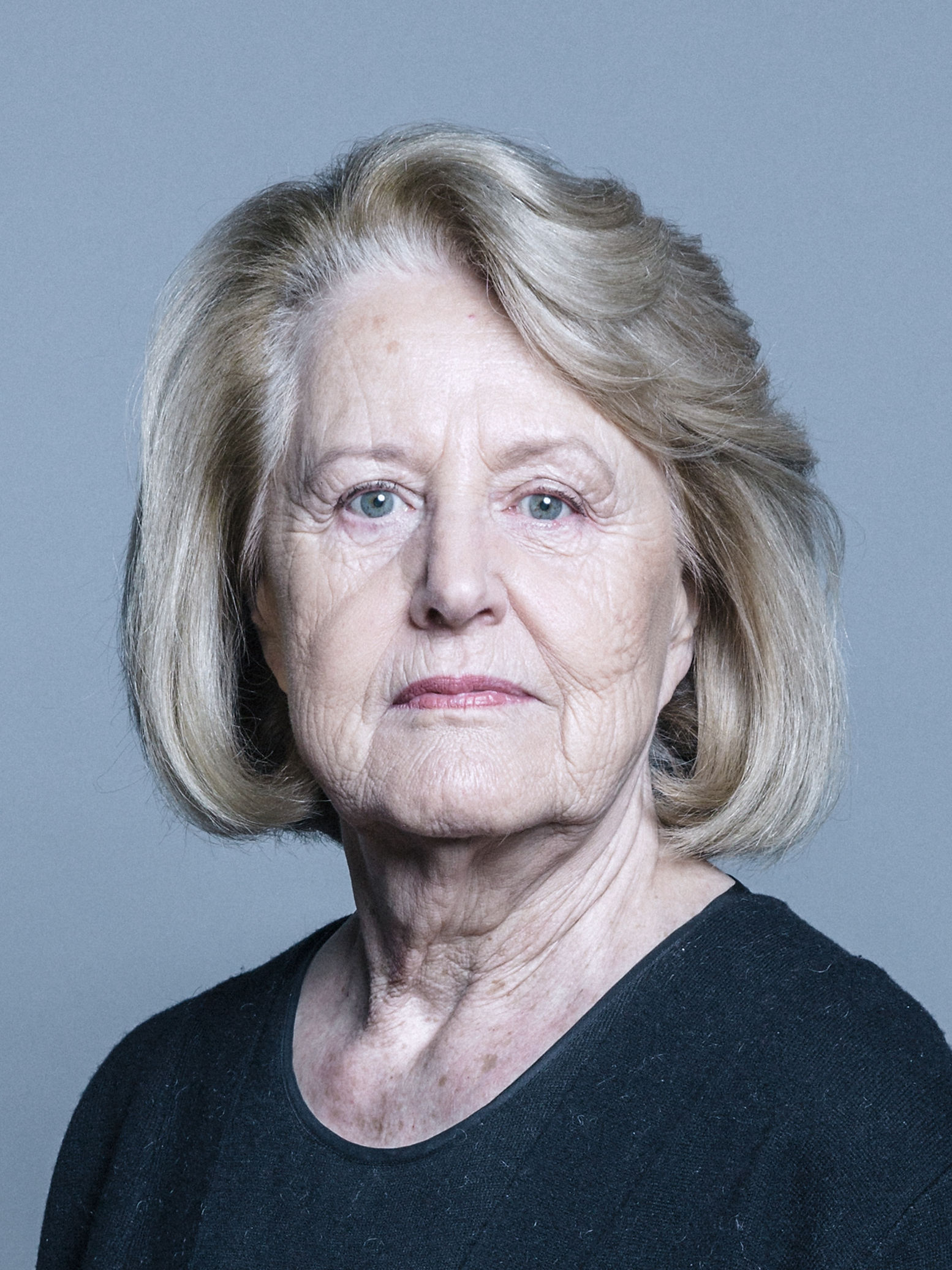
- Official portrait, 2018

Member of the House of Lords
- Lord Temporal
- Life peerage 17 February 1995 – 28 February 2025

Personal details
- Born: Elizabeth Margaret Bennett; 4 June 1940 (age 86)
- Spouse: John Smith (m. 1967; died 1994)
- Children: 3, including Sarah and Catherine
- Education: University of Glasgow

Elizabeth Margaret Smith, Baroness Smith of Gilmorehill, DL (née Bennett; born 4 June 1940), is a British peer and patron of the arts. She is the widow of John Smith, who led the Labour Party from 1992 to 1994.

Born Elizabeth Margaret Bennett, Smith was educated at Hutchesons' Girls Grammar School and the University of Glasgow.

Baroness Smith is the president of Scottish Opera and served as the chairman of the Edinburgh Festival Fringe from 1995 to 2012. She is also a governor of the English-Speaking Union and a board member of the Centre for European Reform. Within a year of her husband's death, she was created a life peer as Baroness Smith of Gilmorehill, of Gilmorehill in the District of the City of Glasgow on 17 February 1995. From 1998 to 2001, she served as president of Birkbeck College, University of London. In 2002, she was elected a fellow of Birkbeck, one of the college's highest honours.

Smith retired from the House of Lords in February 2025, having not spoken in the Lords chamber since 1999.

Smith received an Honorary Doctorate from Heriot-Watt University in 1998.

She has three daughters, including Sarah Smith, who is the BBC News North America Editor, and Catherine Smith, who is Advocate General for Scotland.
