= Sarah Smith (journalist) =

Scottish journalist (born 1968)

The Honourable Sarah Smith
- Born: Sarah Elizabeth Smith; 22 November 1968 (age 57); Edinburgh, Scotland
- Education: University of Glasgow (MA)
- Occupation: Journalist
- Employer: BBC
- Title: North America Editor, BBC News
- Spouse: Simon Conway (m. 2007)
- Parents: John Smith (father); The Baroness Smith of Gilmorehill (mother)
- Relatives: Catherine Smith (sister)

Sarah Elizabeth Smith (born 22 November 1968) is a Scottish radio and television journalist with the BBC. She is BBC News's North America Editor, with responsibilities for reporting on all major news stories across the United States and Canada. She previously held the post of Scotland Editor, having joined the BBC in spring 2014 for the run-up to the Scottish independence referendum on 18 September 2014.

Smith has presented the BBC Radio 4 Today programme. She has covered stories ranging from the United States presidential elections and the Madrid train bombings (for which Channel 4 News won an International Emmy in 2004), to the resignation of Iain Duncan Smith and an exclusive interview with Saddam Hussein's defence lawyer. Smith is the eldest daughter of John Smith, the former Leader of the Opposition and Labour Party Leader from 1992 until his death in 1994.

== Early life ==
Smith was born in Edinburgh in 1968 and was raised in Morningside with her two younger sisters. She attended Boroughmuir High School. She then graduated from the University of Glasgow in 1989 with a Master of Arts degree.

== Career ==
Smith began her journalistic career as a graduate trainee with BBC Scotland. She spent a year living and working in Belfast for BBC Northern Ireland, during which time she was held at gunpoint by the Ulster Defence Association (UDA) in its West Belfast headquarters.

In 1991, Smith moved to London as an assistant producer with BBC Youth Programmes, working on Rough Guide, Rapido and Reportage. Two years later she moved to news and current affairs, first as assistant producer with the Public Eye and Here & Now programmes. She then worked as a producer for the BBC on programmes as diverse as Newsnight, Public Eye and Rough Guides.

On 5 News she was a reporter for two years. Smith was then the first newsreader on More4 News on Channel 4's digital television sister channel More4. She was Channel 4 News's Washington correspondent before moving to the post of business correspondent in the summer of 2011.

Smith presented BBC Two's Scottish current affairs programme, Scotland 2014, alongside sports presenter Jonathan Sutherland. The programme first aired on 27 May 2014. She was appointed the BBC's first Scotland editor in November 2015, to cover Scottish news for a UK audience.

In August 2017, it was announced that Smith was to succeed Andrew Neil as the presenter of the Sunday Politics programme on BBC One from mid-September that year.

In November 2021, it was announced that Smith had been appointed BBC News's North America editor, succeeding Jon Sopel.

== Family ==
Smith is the eldest daughter of John Smith, late leader of the Labour Party, and of his wife, the Baroness Smith of Gilmorehill. She has two younger sisters: Jane and Catherine Smith, who is the Advocate General for Scotland.

The John Smith Memorial Trust, on whose Advisory Council she sits, lists her as The Hon. Sarah Smith; her mother's status as a Baroness allows her the right to use "the Honourable" before her forename.

On 22 September 2007, Smith married Simon Conway, an author, former British Army officer and co-chair of the Cluster Munition Coalition, on the island of Iona, where her father is buried. The service was led by Rev. Douglas Alexander, father of former Scottish Labour Party leader Wendy Alexander. In 2014, she returned to live with her mother in Morningside, Edinburgh. In 2022, she moved to Washington, D.C., following her appointment as the BBC's North America editor.

Media offices
Position created	Scotland Editor: BBC News; 2015–2021	Succeeded by James Cook
Preceded by Jon Sopel	North America Editor: BBC News; 2021–present	Incumbent
