= Baroness Clark =

Baroness Clark may refer to:

- Lynda Clark, Baroness Clark of Calton (born 1949), Scottish judge
- Katy Clark, Baroness Clark of Kilwinning (born 1967), British politician and Labour MP and MSP

== See also ==
- Lord Clark (disambiguation)
