= Special Envoy on Intelligence and Law Enforcement Data Sharing =

The Special Envoy on Intelligence and Law Enforcement Data Sharing is a British creation of the diplomatic corps at Cabinet level to report on, and facilitate dialogue between the executive branch of government and technology firms, often global in nature, that provide service in the internet realm.

== Summary ==
In July 2014, then-Prime Minister David Cameron expressed frustration with American communications providers for "severely constraining" the tasks of the GCHQ over jurisdiction issues. At the time, the Data Retention and Investigatory Powers Act 2014 (DRIP) was required, according to Cameron, to "preserve" surveillance schemes used in the UK by state officials. The post was conceived at that time.

Former Ambassador to the US (2007 to 2012) Sir Nigel Sheinwald was appointed to the post on 19 September 2014, shortly before the Rifkind report on the murder of Fusilier Lee Rigby had been issued to public view. This role was announced by the PM David Cameron when he set out the government’s plans to introduce emergency legislation to preserve data retention and investigation powers (the Data Retention and Investigatory Powers Act 2014) in July 2014, however, no mention is made of the post in the legislation.

The post, which is based in the Cabinet Office and reports to the Prime Minister and Deputy Prime Minister, through the Cabinet Secretary, has as its "overarching objective ... to lead discussions with governments, other key international partners and Communications Service Providers (CPSs) [sic] on ways to improve access to and sharing of law enforcement and intelligence data in different jurisdictions." The Special Envoy regularly updates the Prime Minister and ministerial colleagues on the progress of these discussions and provides comprehensive advice on how best to handle these difficult issues. A public two-page report resulted in June 2015. Sheinwald described his work thus:

Over the last nine months I have made three visits to the US for meetings with the US Government, agencies and former practitioners in Washington. I have met with the main CSPs on the West Coast and leads in London. I have also visited Brussels, engaged other international partners, and consulted selected experts, academics and reviewers in London.

== Data Sharing ==
Sheinwald remarked on the trouble with the US Wiretap and Stored Communications Acts, and seemed to feel that EU's Mutual Legal Assistance Convention and the US/UK Mutual Legal Assistance Treaty (MLAT) would be a partial solution to data sharing and jurisdictional problems. He also suggested a "new international framework" to allow "certain democratic countries—with similar values and high standards of oversight, transparency and privacy protection" to act on urgent counter-terrorism requests.

Sheinwald said that the British still struggled to obtain access to data, but since he was appointed, cooperation on the most urgent requests, "particularly in the areas of counter-terrorism and other threat-to-life and child-protection cases" with the US companies had increased. He remarked: "The companies' assistance in these cases has improved, showing the value of active engagement with them. Cooperation remains incomplete, and the companies and governments concerned agree that we need to work on longer term solutions."

One newspaper characterised the report as saying that existing international laws will never be enough to persuade US internet companies to hand over their customers’ personal data to the British police in urgent counter-terrorism cases. Concerns were raised in Parliament over the issue, and Theresa May remarked that her then-forthcoming bill, which subsequently was passed as the Investigatory Powers Act 2016, would strike a fine balance.

== Bilateral Treaty ==
On 25 June 2015, an unpublished report from the Special Envoy recommended that a new bilateral treaty be negotiated to force the cooperation of U.S. internet companies, in order to provide a legal, front-door alternative to the Snooper's Charter surveillance scheme. At the time, it was thought that this bilateral would scrap the need to revive the snooping powers from the 2012 communications data bill which was to require British ISPs to share data from US firms passing over their networks, and so to enforce their compliance. The report had been classified as top secret by the Cabinet Office because it details each company’s operations. The MLAT process was described as slow, and concerns were raised about the efficacy of the 2014 DRIPA.

Bilateral treaties and the role of the Special Envoy were also discussed in the 2015 report of the Independent Reviewer of Terrorism Legislation.

One report noted that, due to the Edward Snowden uproar and WikiLeaks-NSA fallout that had occurred contemporaneously, Apple CEO Tim Cook had "taken a moral stance in defence of individual privacy" over end-to-end encryption. Said Cook:

If those of us in positions of responsibility fail to do everything in our power to protect the right of privacy, we risk something far more valuable than money. We risk our way of life,
