= Keith Stewart, Baron Stewart of Dirleton =

Scottish lawyer (born 1965)

The Right Honourable The Lord Stewart of Dirleton KC
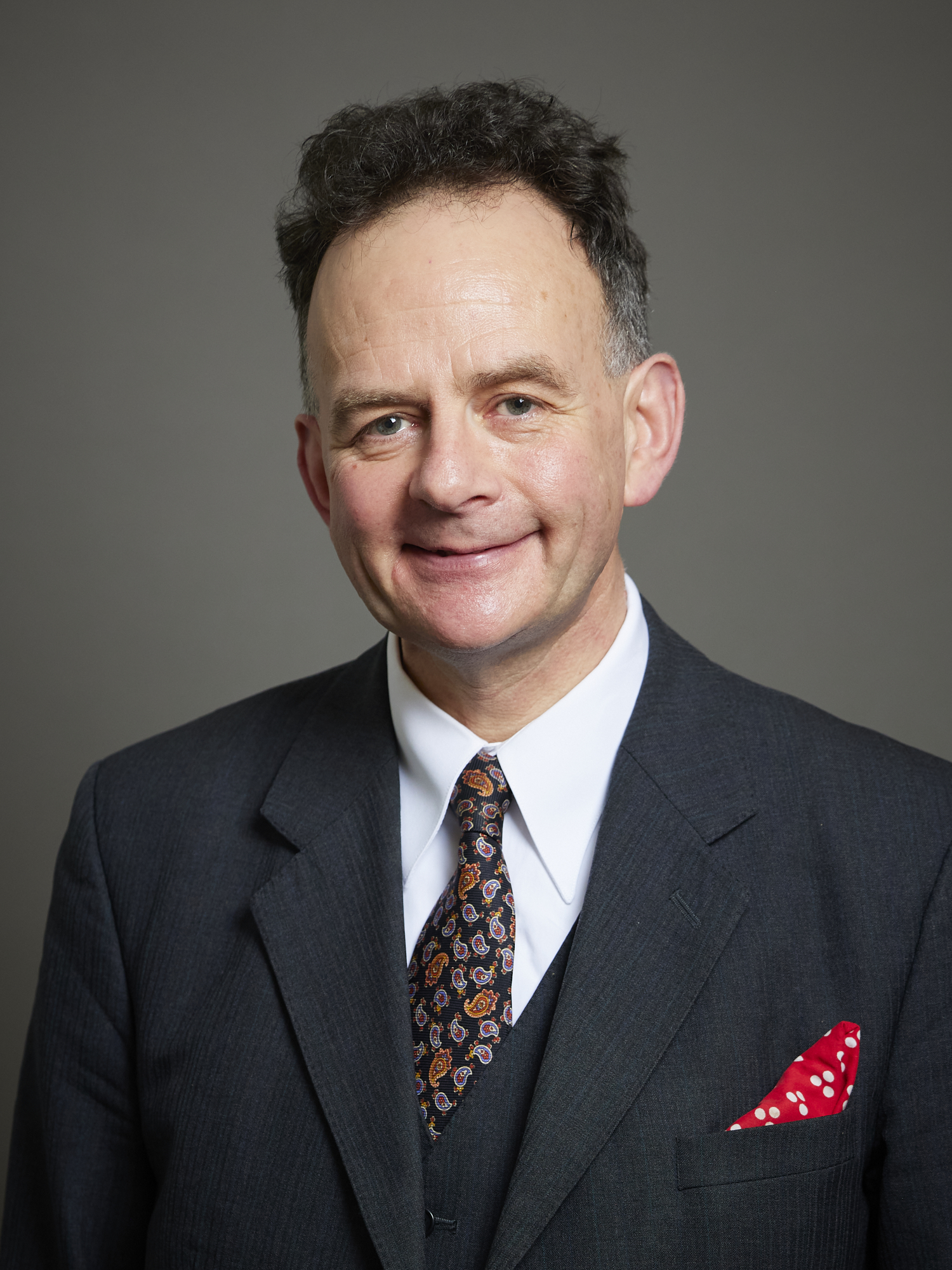
- Official Portrait, 2024

Advocate General for Scotland
- In office 15 October 2020 – 5 July 2024
- Prime Minister: Boris Johnson; Liz Truss; Rishi Sunak
- Preceded by: The Lord Keen of Elie
- Succeeded by: The Baroness Smith of Cluny

Member of the House of Lords
- Lord Temporal
- Life peerage 6 November 2020

Personal details
- Born: 31 October 1965 (age 60)
- Party: Conservative
- Children: 2, Douglas and ?
- Education: Keble College, Oxford; University of Edinburgh
- Profession: Advocate

Keith Douglas Stewart, Baron Stewart of Dirleton KC (born 31 October 1965) is a British lawyer who specialises in criminal law. He was appointed Advocate General for Scotland on 15 October 2020, succeeding Lord Keen of Elie who resigned over the United Kingdom Internal Market Bill.

== Early life ==
Lord Stewart attended Dirleton Primary School and George Heriot's School before attaining a degree in English at Keble College, Oxford. He received his LLB from the University of Edinburgh and his diploma from the University of Strathclyde.

He was called to the bar in 1993 and was appointed Queen's Counsel in 2011.

== Advocate General for Scotland ==
Stewart was appointed Advocate General for Scotland on 15 October 2020 after the position had been vacant for a month. He was created Baron Stewart of Dirleton, of Dirleton in the County of East Lothian, on 6 November 2020, and was introduced to the House of Lords on 9 November 2020.

Legal offices
Preceded by The Lord Keen of Elie	Advocate General for Scotland; 2020–2024	Succeeded by The Baroness Smith of Cluny
Orders of precedence in the United Kingdom
Preceded by The Lord Bellingham	Gentlemen; Baron Stewart of Dirleton	Followed by The Lord Udny-Lister
