= Nigel Sheinwald =

British diplomat (born 1953)

Sir Nigel Sheinwald GCMG
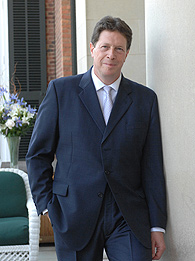

British Ambassador to the United States
- In office October 2007 – January 2012
- Monarch: Elizabeth II
- President: George W. Bush; Barack Obama
- Prime Minister: Gordon Brown; David Cameron
- Preceded by: Sir David Manning
- Succeeded by: Sir Peter Westmacott

British Permanent Representative to the European Union
- In office 2000–2003
- Preceded by: Sir Stephen Wall
- Succeeded by: Sir John Grant

Personal details
- Born: 26 June 1953 (age 73) London, United Kingdom
- Education: Balliol College, Oxford

Sir Nigel Elton Sheinwald GCMG (born 26 June 1953) is a former senior British diplomat, who served as Ambassador to the United States of America between October 2007 and January 2012. He was appointed "Special Envoy on intelligence and law enforcement data sharing" in September 2014.

He is also a senior advisor to political consultancy Rasmussen Global.

== Education ==
Sheinwald was born in London, England, and educated at Harrow County School for Boys and Balliol College, Oxford.

== Career ==
Sheinwald worked in the Foreign and Commonwealth Office on the Japan desk from 1976 to 1977 and on the Zimbabwe desk from 1979 to 1981. He served in Moscow from 1978 to 1979 and was Head of the Foreign Office Anglo-Soviet Section from 1981 to 1983. From 1983 to 1987, he worked in the political section of the British Embassy in Washington, D.C. From 1987 to 1989 he was Deputy Head of the Foreign Office's Policy Planning Staff. He was Deputy Head of the Foreign Office's European Union (Internal) Department from 1989 to 1992 and Head of the UK Representations Political and Institutional Section in Brussels from 1993 to 1995.

Sheinwald was Foreign Office Press Secretary from 1995 to 1998 and Europe Director from 1998 to 2000, before serving as the UK Ambassador and Permanent Representative to the European Union from 2000 to 2003. From 2003 to 2007, he was Foreign Policy and Defence Adviser under Prime Minister Tony Blair and then as Head of the Cabinet Office Defence and Overseas Secretariat.

He is credited with successfully negotiating the release of fifteen Royal Navy personnel from Iran in 2007. He made a critical breakthrough in the standoff during a call with the head of Iran's Supreme National Security Council, Ali Larijani.

In October 2007 he was appointed Ambassador to the United States.

Sheinwald was appointed a Companion of the Order of St Michael and St George (CMG) in 1998, in 2000 was advanced to a knighthood as a Knight Commander (KCMG), and in 2011 was promoted to Knight Grand Cross of the same Order (GCMG). In June 2011, the Prime Minister's Office announced that Sir Peter Westmacott, then HM Ambassador to the French Republic, would replace him in January 2012 as British Ambassador to the US.

== Views ==
Speaking to the New Statesman in November 2017, Sheinwald expressed unease about British Foreign Secretary Boris Johnson's influence on international affairs: "His [Johnson’s] style gets in the way of handling foreign relations in a serious, responsible way at a time of real difficulty for this country… I don’t think he’s been at all helpful to the UK national interest, and I think that’s very regrettable indeed".

Diplomatic posts
Preceded by Sir David Manning	British Ambassador to the United States; 2007–2012	Succeeded by Sir Peter Westmacott
