= Norman Wylie, Lord Wylie =

Scottish politician, lawyer and judge

The Right Honourable Lord Wylie PC
- Norman Wylie

Member of Parliament for Edinburgh Pentlands
- In office 15 October 1964 – 8 February 1974
- Preceded by: John Hope
- Succeeded by: Malcolm Rifkind

Personal details
- Born: Norman Russell Wylie; 26 October 1923 Elderslie, Scotland
- Died: 7 September 2005 (aged 81)
- Party: Conservative
- Other political affiliations: Unionist (before 1965)
- Education: Paisley Grammar School
- Alma mater: St Edmund Hall, Oxford; University of Edinburgh; University of Glasgow

Military service
- Allegiance: United Kingdom
- Branch/service: Royal Navy
- Years of service: 1942–1946
- Unit: Fleet Air Arm

Norman Russell Wylie, Lord Wylie, PC (26 October 1923 – 7 September 2005) was a Scottish Conservative and Scottish Unionist politician, lawyer, and judge.

Born in Elderslie, he was educated at Paisley Grammar School, St Edmund Hall, Oxford, and the universities of Glasgow and Edinburgh. He served in the Fleet Air Arm from 1942 to 1946. He was Member of Parliament (MP) for Edinburgh Pentlands between October 1964 and February 1974. Between 1970 and 1974 he held the title of Lord Advocate having briefly been Solicitor General for Scotland from April to October 1964. He was a Senator of the College of Justice from 1974 to 1990, and later served as a Justice of Appeal in the Republic of Botswana from 1994 to 1996.

His son Neville Wylie is an associate professor of politics at the University of Nottingham.

Parliament of the United Kingdom
Preceded by John Hope	Member of Parliament for Edinburgh Pentlands; 1964–Feb 1974	Succeeded by Malcolm Rifkind
Legal offices
Preceded by David Anderson	Solicitor General for Scotland; April–October 1964	Succeeded by James Leechman
Preceded by Henry Wilson	Lord Advocate; 1970–1974	Succeeded by Ronald King Murray
