= Neil Davidson, Baron Davidson of Glen Clova =

Scottish lawyer and government official

The Right Honourable The Lord Davidson of Glen Clova KC
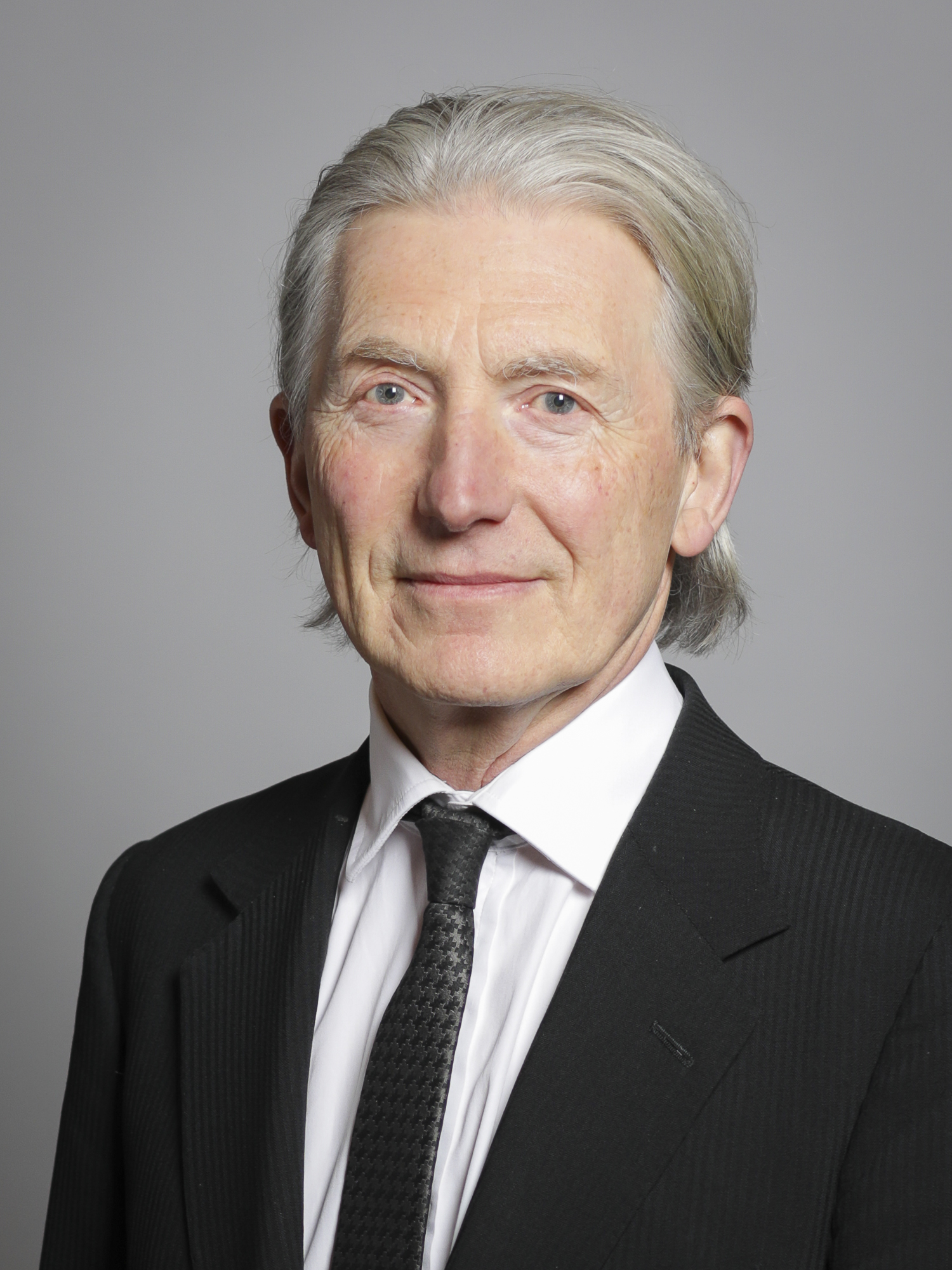
- Davidson in 2019

Shadow Advocate General for Scotland
- In office 10 October 2010 – 17 May 2021
- Leader: Ed Miliband; Harriet Harman; Jeremy Corbyn; Sir Keir Starmer
- Succeeded by: The Lord Falconer of Thoroton

Shadow Spokesperson for Scotland
- In office 4 June 2018 – 17 May 2021
- Leader: Keir Starmer
- Preceded by: The Lord McAvoy
- Succeeded by: The Lord Falconer of Thoroton

Advocate General for Scotland
- In office 21 March 2006 – 11 May 2010
- Prime Minister: Tony Blair; Gordon Brown
- Preceded by: The Baroness Clark of Calton
- Succeeded by: The Lord Wallace of Tankerness

Solicitor General for Scotland
- In office 24 February 2000 – 28 November 2001
- Monarch: Elizabeth II
- First Minister: Donald Dewar; Jim Wallace (Acting); Henry McLeish; Jim Wallace (Acting)
- Preceded by: Colin Boyd
- Succeeded by: Elish Angiolini

Member of the House of Lords
- Lord Temporal
- Life peerage 22 March 2006

Personal details
- Born: Neil Forbes Davidson; 13 September 1950 (age 76)
- Party: Labour
- Spouse: Regina Anne Sprissler (m. 1980)
- Education: University of Stirling; University of Bradford; University of Edinburgh
- Profession: Advocate
- Website: www.oag.gov.uk

Neil Forbes Davidson, Baron Davidson of Glen Clova KC (born 13 September 1950) is a Scottish lawyer and former Advocate General for Scotland.

== Background ==
Davidson was born to John and Flora Davidson, and was educated at the University of Stirling (BA), the University of Bradford (MSc) and the University of Edinburgh (LLB, LLM), and was admitted to the Faculty of Advocates in 1979. His private practice is in commercial and administrative law.

== Career ==
Davidson was admitted to the Faculty of Advocates in 1979, and appointed Standing Junior Counsel to the Registrar General in 1982, and the Department of Health and Social Security in 1988. He was called to the Bar of England and Wales at the Inner Temple in 1990, and appointed Queen's Counsel in Scotland in 1993. From 1993 to 2000, he was a Director of City Disputes Panel, a private dispute resolution service, and on 24 February 2000 was appointed Solicitor General for Scotland, which office he held until November 2001. He is a member of 11 King's Bench Walk Chambers, founded by former Lord Chancellor Lord Irvine of Lairg.

On 21 March 2006, it was announced that the Prime Minister, Tony Blair, had appointed him to the office of Advocate General for Scotland, which had been vacant since the resignation of Lynda Clark, Baroness Clark of Calton on 18 January that year to take up office as a Senator of the College of Justice. He was created a life peer, as Baron Davidson of Glen Clova, of Glen Clova in Angus, on 22 March, and sits on the Labour benches. Following Labour's defeat in the 2010 general election, Davidson was succeeded in the post by Liberal Democrat Jim Wallace, former Deputy First Minister of Scotland.

Davidson is the co-author of Judicial Review in Scotland (1986). He was the International Commission of Jurists' chef de mission to Egypt on sequestration of the Egyptian Bar in 1998. He was the convener of the Human Rights Committee of the Faculty of Advocates.

In 2005, Davidson was appointed by the UK government to head a review examining the implementation of European Union legislation in the UK. The report – known as the 'Davidson Review' – was issued in 2006 and recommended a series of measures to simplify implementation, including a ban on 'gold-plating'.

== Tibet visit ==
In August 2014, Davidson attended the Fourth Forum on Development of Tibet in Lhasa, Tibet as a guest of the Chinese government. Chinese state media reported comments by him praising China's work in Tibet and criticising Western media. The conference organisers published a "Lhasa Consensus" document supporting the position and policy of the Chinese government regarding Tibet. According to the document, it was endorsed by all participants in the forum.

Shortly after, a number of Western participants disassociated themselves from the 'Consensus', stating that they were unaware it would be represented as having their support. Lord Davidson did not respond to Western media enquiries regarding the accuracy of the comments attributed to him and seeking clarification of his position regarding the Lhasa Consensus. His participation, reported comments and subsequent refusal to make further comment were strongly criticised by Free Tibet, who noted that during his visit to Tibet, security forces fired on a demonstration in another region of Tibet, fatally injuring four protesters.

== See also ==
- List of Scottish Executive Ministerial Teams

Legal offices
Preceded by Colin Boyd	Solicitor General for Scotland; 2000–2001	Succeeded by Elish Angiolini
Preceded by Baroness Clark of Calton	Advocate General for Scotland; 2006–2010	Succeeded by Lord Wallace of Tankerness
Orders of precedence in the United Kingdom
Preceded by The Lord Hastings of Scarisbrick	Gentlemen; Baron Davidson of Glen Cova	Followed by The Lord Crisp
