= Malcolm Rifkind =

British politician (born 1946)

The Right Honourable Sir Malcolm Rifkind KCMG KC
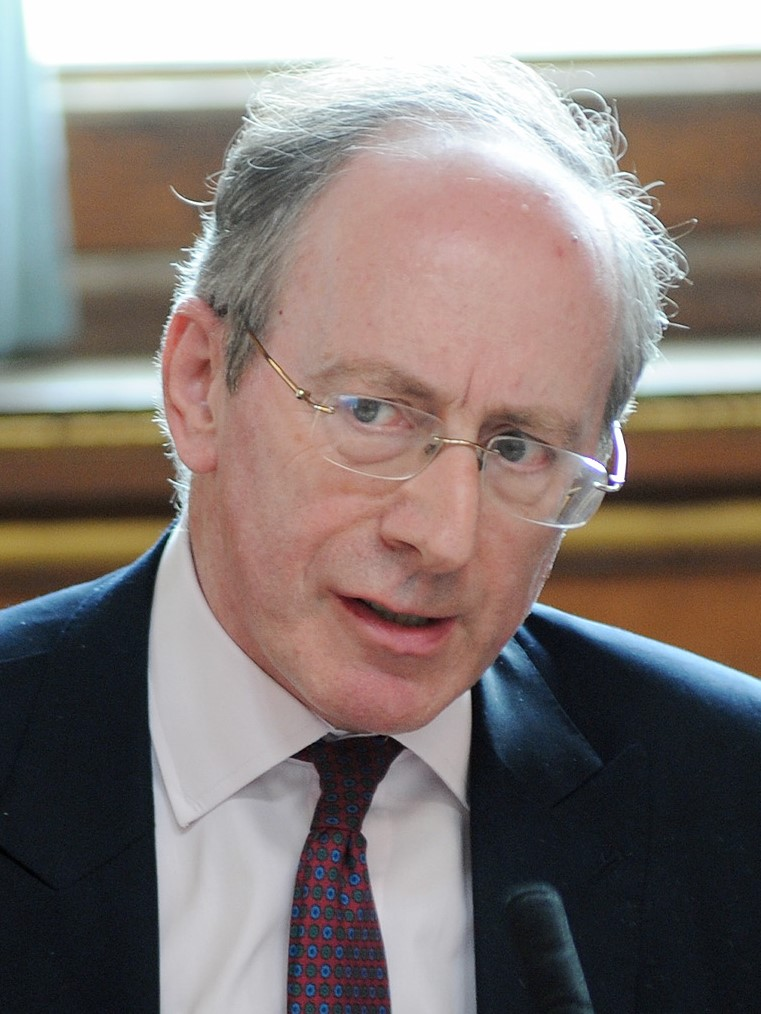
- Rifkind in 2011

Secretary of State for Foreign and Commonwealth Affairs
- In office 5 July 1995 – 2 May 1997
- Prime Minister: John Major
- Preceded by: Douglas Hurd
- Succeeded by: Robin Cook

Secretary of State for Defence
- In office 10 April 1992 – 5 July 1995
- Prime Minister: John Major
- Preceded by: Tom King
- Succeeded by: Michael Portillo

Secretary of State for Transport
- In office 28 November 1990 – 10 April 1992
- Prime Minister: John Major
- Preceded by: Cecil Parkinson
- Succeeded by: John MacGregor

Secretary of State for Scotland
- In office 11 January 1986 – 28 November 1990
- Prime Minister: Margaret Thatcher
- Preceded by: George Younger
- Succeeded by: Ian Lang
Junior ministerial offices
Minister of State for Europe
In office 9 June 1983 – 11 January 1986
Prime Minister	Margaret Thatcher
Preceded by	Douglas Hurd
Succeeded by	Lynda Chalker
Parliamentary Under-Secretary of State for Foreign and Commonwealth Affairs
In office 6 April 1982 – 9 June 1983
Prime Minister	Margaret Thatcher
Preceded by	The Lord Trefgarne
Succeeded by	Ray Whitney
Parliamentary Under-Secretary of State for Scotland
In office 7 May 1979 – 6 April 1982
Prime Minister	Margaret Thatcher
Preceded by	Frank McElhone
Succeeded by	John MacKay
Committee offices
Chair of the Intelligence and Security Committee
In office 6 July 2010 – 24 February 2015
Preceded by	Kim Howells
Succeeded by	Dominic Grieve
Chair of the Standards and Privileges Committee
In office 1 December 2009 – 12 April 2010
Preceded by	David Curry
Succeeded by	Kevin Barron
Further offices held
Shadow Secretary of State for Work and Pensions
In office 6 May 2005 – 6 December 2005
Leader	Michael Howard
Preceded by	David Willetts
Succeeded by	Philip Hammond
Member of Parliament for Kensington Kensington and Chelsea (2005–2010)
In office 5 May 2005 – 30 March 2015
Preceded by	Michael Portillo
Succeeded by	Victoria Borwick
Member of Parliament for Edinburgh Pentlands
In office 28 February 1974 – 8 April 1997
Preceded by	Norman Wylie
Succeeded by	Lynda Clark

Personal details
- Born: Malcolm Leslie Rifkind; 21 June 1946 (age 80) Edinburgh, Scotland
- Party: Conservative
- Spouses: Edith Steinberg (m. 1970; died 2019) Jennifer (Sherrie) Bodie (m. 2022)
- Children: 2 including Hugo
- Education: George Watson's College, University of Edinburgh (LLB, MSc)

Sir Malcolm Leslie Rifkind (born 21 June 1946) is a British politician who served in the cabinets of Margaret Thatcher and John Major from 1986 to 1997, and most recently as chair of the Intelligence and Security Committee of Parliament from 2010 to 2015.

Rifkind was the MP for Edinburgh Pentlands from 1974 to 1997. He served in various roles as a Cabinet minister, including Secretary of State for Scotland from 1986 to 1990, Defence Secretary from 1992 to 1995, and Foreign Secretary from 1995 to 1997. In 1997, his party lost power and he lost his seat to the Labour Party. He attempted, unsuccessfully, to be re-elected in Pentlands in 2001; the constituency was abolished before the 2005 general election and he was adopted, and subsequently elected, as the Conservative candidate for Kensington and Chelsea. He announced his intention to seek the leadership of the party before the 2005 Conservative leadership election, but withdrew before polling began.

Rifkind stood for the Kensington seat and was elected at the 2010 general election with a majority of 8,616 votes. He became chairman of the Intelligence and Security Committee of Parliament. In January 2015 he was appointed by the Organization for Security and Co-operation in Europe (OSCE) as a member of their Eminent Persons Panel on European Security. He did not stand in the 2015 general election. In December 2015, Rifkind was appointed a visiting professor by King's College, London in their Department of War Studies. He was invited to become a Distinguished Fellow at the Royal United Services Institute (RUSI). In July 2016, his memoirs, Power and Pragmatism, were published.

== Early life ==
Rifkind was born in Edinburgh to a Lithuanian-Jewish family that emigrated to Britain in the 1890s from the Russian Empire (now Lithuania); among his cousins were Leon and Samuel Brittan. He was educated at George Watson's College and the University of Edinburgh where he studied law before taking a postgraduate degree in political science (his thesis was on land apportionment in Southern Rhodesia). While at university he took part in an overland expedition to the Middle East and India. He also appeared on University Challenge.

He worked as an assistant lecturer at the University College of Rhodesia in Salisbury (now Harare) from 1967 to 1968. He was called to the Scottish Bar in 1970 and practised full-time as an Advocate until 1974. He was appointed a Queen's Counsel in 1985 and a member of the Privy Council in 1986. From 1970 to 1974 he was a member of Edinburgh City Council.

== Member of Parliament ==
Rifkind first stood for Parliament, unsuccessfully, in 1970 in the Edinburgh Central constituency. He entered Parliament in the February 1974 general election representing Edinburgh Pentlands for the Scottish Conservative and Unionist Party. During the leadership election in 1975, he supported Edward Heath in the first round but when Heath withdrew Rifkind voted for Margaret Thatcher. Thatcher, on becoming leader, appointed Rifkind an Opposition front-bench spokesman on Scottish Affairs. He subsequently resigned from that position (along with the Shadow Scottish Secretary, Alick Buchanan-Smith) in protest at the decision of the Shadow Cabinet to vote against the Government's Bill for a Scottish Assembly. Rifkind argued that as, at that time, the Conservative Party supported the principle of a Scottish Assembly, it would have been preferable either to vote for the Second Reading of the Bill or to abstain, and try to improve the Bill. In the subsequent referendum on a Scottish Assembly, Rifkind voted in favour, but withdrew his support when the result of the referendum showed Scotland almost equally divided over the proposal.

=== Junior Minister ===
Rifkind was one of only five Ministers (Tony Newton, Kenneth Clarke, Patrick Mayhew and Lynda Chalker are the others) to serve throughout the whole 18 years of the Governments of Margaret Thatcher and John Major. This represents the longest uninterrupted Ministerial service in Britain since Lord Palmerston in the early 19th century.

He was appointed Minister of Home Affairs and the Environment at the Scottish Office in the 1979 Thatcher Government. In that role, he was responsible for the passage of the Tenants' Rights (Scotland) Act which resulted in a massive increase of home ownership in Scotland as council tenants bought their homes. He was also responsible, under the Secretary of State George Younger, for relations with local government and for the police and prisons.

In 1982, at the time of the Falklands War, he was transferred to the Foreign and Commonwealth Office as Parliamentary Under-Secretary of State, being promoted to Minister of State at the Foreign Office in 1983. At the Foreign Office, he served first under Francis Pym and then Sir Geoffrey Howe. Rifkind was responsible for Britain's relations with the Soviet Union and Eastern Europe, the European Community, and sub-Saharan Africa. He assisted Sir Geoffrey Howe in persuading Thatcher to change the Government's policy on the Soviet Union, attended the Chequers meeting which decided to invite Soviet leaders to the United Kingdom, and was present at Chequers when Thatcher had her first meeting with Mikhail Gorbachev and decided that he was a Soviet leader with whom "she could do business".

Rifkind also had strong links with the Solidarity movement in Poland. In 1984, he made a Ministerial visit to Poland. Against the wishes of General Jaruzelski, the Polish Communist President, he insisted on laying a wreath at the grave of the murdered Polish priest Father Jerzy Popiełuszko, and had a meeting with three of the leaders of the banned Solidarity movement. Jaruzelski attacked Rifkind and cancelled a meeting he was due to have with him but Rifkind's meeting with Solidarity created a precedent that was followed by the West German Foreign Minister, Hans-Dietrich Genscher and other Western ministers. This helped force the Polish Government to remove the ban on Solidarity and acknowledge the need for political reform and pluralism. Rifkind was, subsequently, decorated by the non-communist democratic Polish Government, as a Commander Cross of the Order of Merit for his support. In 1994 Rifkind, as Minister responsible for the European Community, was appointed by the Prime Minister as her personal representative on the Dooge Committee of the European Community. The Report of the Committee helped prepare the way for the achievement of the Single European Market.

=== Secretary of State for Scotland ===
In 1986 he was promoted into the cabinet as Secretary of State for Scotland. He gained a reputation as being a moderate voice on social and economic issues, and sometimes had disputes with Margaret Thatcher. As Secretary of State, he initiated major reforms in Scotland. These included the privatisation of the Scottish electricity industry and the Scottish Transport Group. He created Scottish Homes as the Government's housing agency; and Scottish Natural Heritage which combined both the Countryside Commission for Scotland and the Nature Conservancy Council. He also transformed the Scottish Development Agency into Scottish Enterprise with much greater private sector involvement. When Rifkind became Secretary of State his first task was to defuse a teachers dispute which was crippling Scottish education. He also sought to help the Ravenscraig steel mill which was threatened with closure. Rifkind opposed closure by the Government arguing that the whole steel industry should be privatised and that the future of individual plants would be determined by the companies that owned them in the private sector. In 1989, Rifkind lobbied for increased funding for Scottish Gaelic broadcasting but was shut down by Nigel Lawson, who Thatcher agreed with.

One of Rifkind's most difficult challenges was the demand from the public for the abolition of the domestic rates system. He supported the introduction of the Poll Tax, which the Cabinet had approved shortly before his appointment. He also agreed with the decision proposed by his predecessor, George Younger, that the new tax should be introduced a year earlier in Scotland than in England because of the political necessity to end the domestic rates. Rifkind subsequently accepted that the poll tax had been a major mistake by the Government. Throughout his term as Scottish Secretary, Rifkind, like Younger before him, and Ian Lang and Michael Forsyth in later years, was constrained by the political weakness of the Conservative Party in Scotland unlike in England. This problem was the underlying reason for his differences with Margaret Thatcher which increased, significantly, towards the end of her Prime Ministership. When Thatcher was challenged by Michael Heseltine for the Leadership of the Conservative Party, Rifkind voted for her. During the tense period that followed the first round of voting Rifkind was one of those who advised Thatcher that it would be best for her to stand down, and did not promise to support her if she stood for election. Thatcher considered his action treachery. In the subsequent Leadership election, he supported Douglas Hurd.

=== Secretary of State for Transport ===
In 1990, he was moved by John Major to be Secretary of State for Transport. One of his first responsibilities was to go into the Channel Tunnel, which was being constructed, and witness the first physical contact between those tunnelling from the French and British ends of the tunnel. One of his main priorities as Transport Secretary was to take forward the policy proposals for the privatisation of the railways. Rifkind supported privatisation but concluded that it would be a mistake to separate ownership of the infrastructure from the operating companies as track costs were a large percentage of their unavoidable costs. This view brought him into conflict with the Treasury and meant that Conservative proposals for privatisation were not ready by the time of the 1992 general election. The Prime Minister favoured the Treasury argument that competition between railway companies would be discouraged if one company owned the track. Rifkind maintained that the competition to rail would come from air and road and not from other rail companies. After Rifkind left the Ministry of Transport in 1992, the Treasury view prevailed, and this led to the creation of Railtrack.

=== Secretary of State for Defence ===
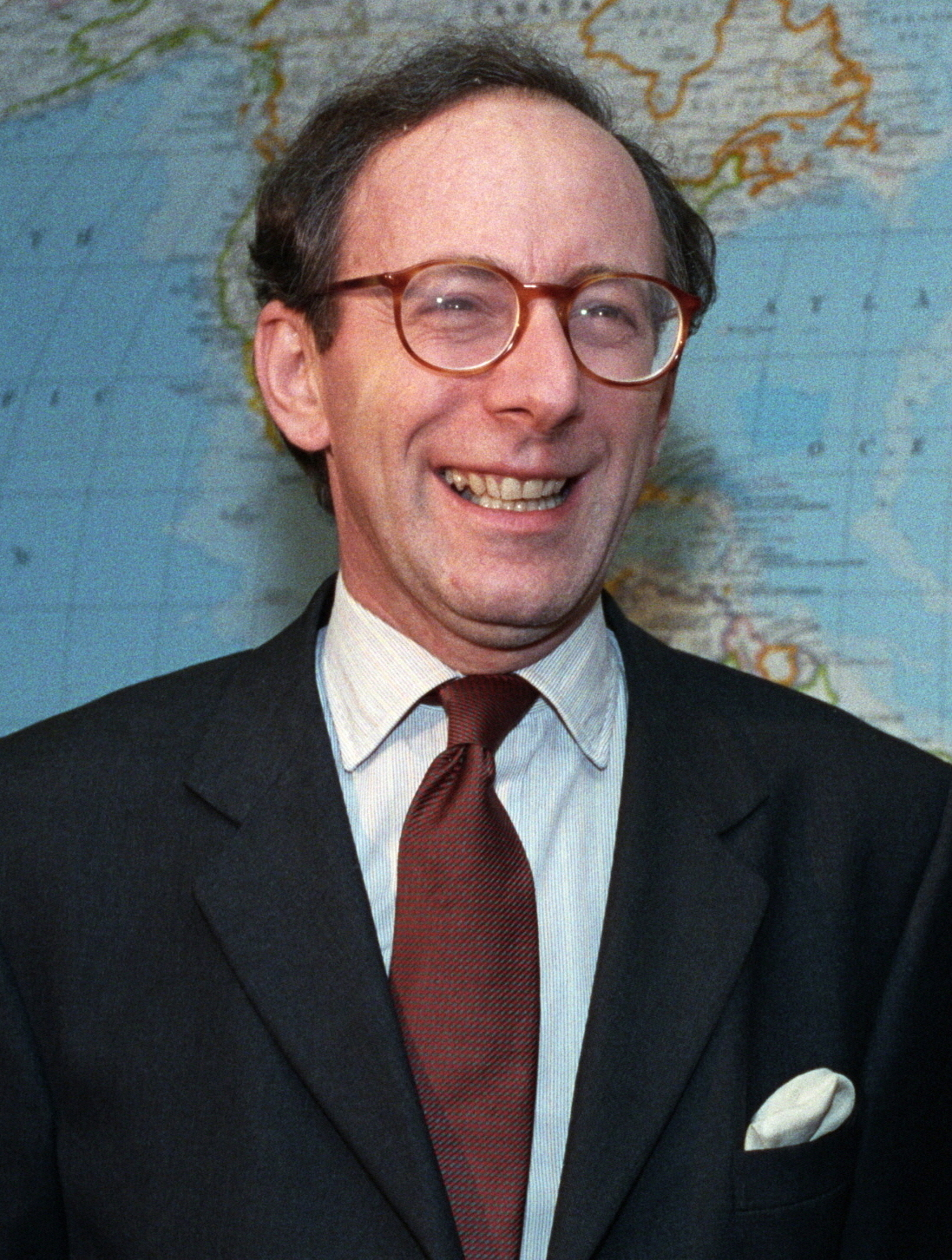
Rifkind in 1993

Rifkind was appointed Secretary of State for Defence after the 1992 general election. Although he had no military background, he was a firm believer in strong defence and armed forces with a global capability. One of his early decisions was to reverse the proposed disbandment of the Cheshire and Staffordshire Regiment and the Royal Scots and King's Own Scottish Borderers. In 1994, he was faced with Treasury demands for major cuts in the Defence budget. In order to protect the fighting capability of the armed forces, he negotiated a settlement with the Treasury whereby he would deliver savings greater than they were demanding but that he would be allowed to keep the additional savings and use them for the purchase of new military equipment for each of the three Services. He had already won the support of the Chiefs of Staff for this approach which provided an incentive for their cooperation in making the necessary economies. The outcome was the Front Line First Report, which was well-received both in Parliament and in the armed forces. Some of its proposals, particularly in regard to defence medical services were, in later years, subjected to heavy criticism. With some of the additional savings that had been found Rifkind was able to secure the agreement of the United States to British purchase of cruise missiles. The United Kingdom was, at that time, the only country to which the Americans were willing to sell cruise missiles. Rifkind also reformed the reserve forces and initiated the policy review which led to the Territorial Army (TA) and other reservists being able to be deployed in operations abroad without the need for full mobilisation of the whole TA as had been needed in the past.

Rifkind dealt with British involvement in the Bosnian War in the former Yugoslavia. Like John Major and Douglas Hurd, the foreign secretary, Rifkind was opposed to intervention by Britain and the international community as combatants in that conflict. He supported the use of British troops and those from other countries to protect humanitarian food convoys that were protecting hundreds of thousands of civilians. Rifkind was a strong and vocal opponent of the American proposal for "lift and strike" which would have ended the UN arms embargo and subjected the Bosnian Serbs to NATO bombing from the air. Rifkind agreed with the UN and European view that such bombing would be incompatible with a UN mission on the ground and would necessitate the ending of that mission. He expressed these views publicly in Washington as well as in London. Although the United States was increasingly frustrated and concerned at this impasse it did not do lasting damage to US-British relations as evidenced by the American willingness to sell cruise missiles to the United Kingdom.

=== Foreign Secretary ===
In the final years of the Major administration, Rifkind was the Foreign Secretary. His tenure was dominated by the issue of Europe. Rifkind adopted a more Eurosceptic tone than his predecessor: he was an enthusiast for the European ideal but was neither a federalist nor a believer in the European single currency. In March 1996, relations with European Union partners sank to a new low over the ban on British beef exports due to the United Kingdom BSE outbreak and the British government's response of a policy of non-cooperation. Due to domestic political considerations, the government deferred a decision on whether to join the single currency until after the general election.

One of Rifkind's first duties as Foreign Secretary was to chair the London Summit on Bosnia which put much greater pressure on the Bosnian Serbs in the aftermath of the Srebrenica massacre and led, in due course, to the Dayton Accord which ended the fighting. As Foreign Secretary, on 24 September 1996, Rifkind addressed the United Nations General Assembly and called for a UN Declaration barring political asylum for terrorists, arguing that they should not be able to benefit from the provisions of the 1951 UN Convention on Refugees to secure political asylum. In the same speech, he emphasised Britain's commitment to the goal of global free trade by 2020 and said all governments should liberalise their economies and lift trading restrictions.

In the Middle East, Rifkind committed the British Government, for the first time, to a Palestinian State on the West Bank and in Gaza. He also, in a speech in the Gulf, called for a Middle Eastern equivalent of the Organization for Security and Co-operation in Europe (OSCE) to enable dialogue to take place, at the regional level between Israel and its Arab neighbours as well as between Iran and the Arab world. One of his main duties was the final negotiations with China over the transfer of Hong Kong. Rifkind had several meetings with the Chinese Foreign Minister both in Beijing and in London, as well as with the Hong Kong Governor, Chris Patten, and elected Hong Kong politicians. Rifkind also, as Foreign Secretary, called for the creation of a North Atlantic Free Trade Area that would have created a free-trade relationship between the European Union and the United States and Canada.

== Election defeat and return to parliament ==
At the 1997 general election, he lost his Pentlands seat in common with all Conservative candidates in Scotland (and Wales), and was succeeded by Labour candidate Lynda Clark. Rifkind tried again, standing for Edinburgh Pentlands against Clark in the 2001 general election; although he improved his showing somewhat, he was unable to overturn the sizeable 10.6% majority in an election where the Conservatives made little progress. During this time, he remained politically active, as president of the Scottish Conservatives, and used his position outside Westminster to criticise the 2003 invasion of Iraq and the Blair Government's support of it. At the time, the Conservative Party was staunchly in support of the invasion.

Following the 1997 general election, Rifkind was offered a peerage which he declined. He received a knighthood in John Major's resignation honours, becoming a Knight Commander of the Order of St Michael and St George (KCMG), in recognition of his work for Foreign and Commonwealth Affairs.

At the 2005 general election, he returned to the House of Commons as Member of Parliament for the London constituency of Kensington and Chelsea with a majority of 12,418.

=== Leadership contender and thereafter ===
On 8 June 2005, a month after the Conservative defeat at the 2005 general election, Rifkind stated that it was "quite likely" that he would stand for the leadership after Michael Howard's resignation. Rifkind subsequently confirmed this on 14 August, although admitting that he had a "mountain to climb", and receiving sparse support amongst Conservative MPs.

Despite this, Rifkind went through to the "conference stage" of the leadership process, in which each candidate was given speaking time to address the Conservative Party Conference directly. In his speech, Rifkind declared that Conservatives had to be "pragmatic, sensitive, and moderate", and stress their "unique combination of principle and patriotism". The speech won eight rounds of applause from the conference, with nearly a minute-long finale.

The speech did not galvanise Rifkind's candidacy, however, which had always been regarded as a long shot – bookmakers had him at 50–1 and a poll found that only 4% of Conservative voters supported his candidacy. Consequently, on 11 October 2005 he announced that he was withdrawing from the leadership contest and that he would be supporting Kenneth Clarke's candidacy, acknowledging that "There is no realistic prospect of me coming through". In endorsing Clarke, Rifkind stated that he was "head and shoulders" above the other candidates, and had both the experience and popular appeal to take on Labour.

On 7 December 2005, he left the Conservative front bench as incoming leader David Cameron formed his team. Rifkind admitted that he had not wished to remain a Shadow cabinet minister unless in the post of Shadow Foreign Secretary, but this post had gone to William Hague. Rifkind declared his loyalty to the new party leader and remains one of the Conservative Party's most experienced senior figures.

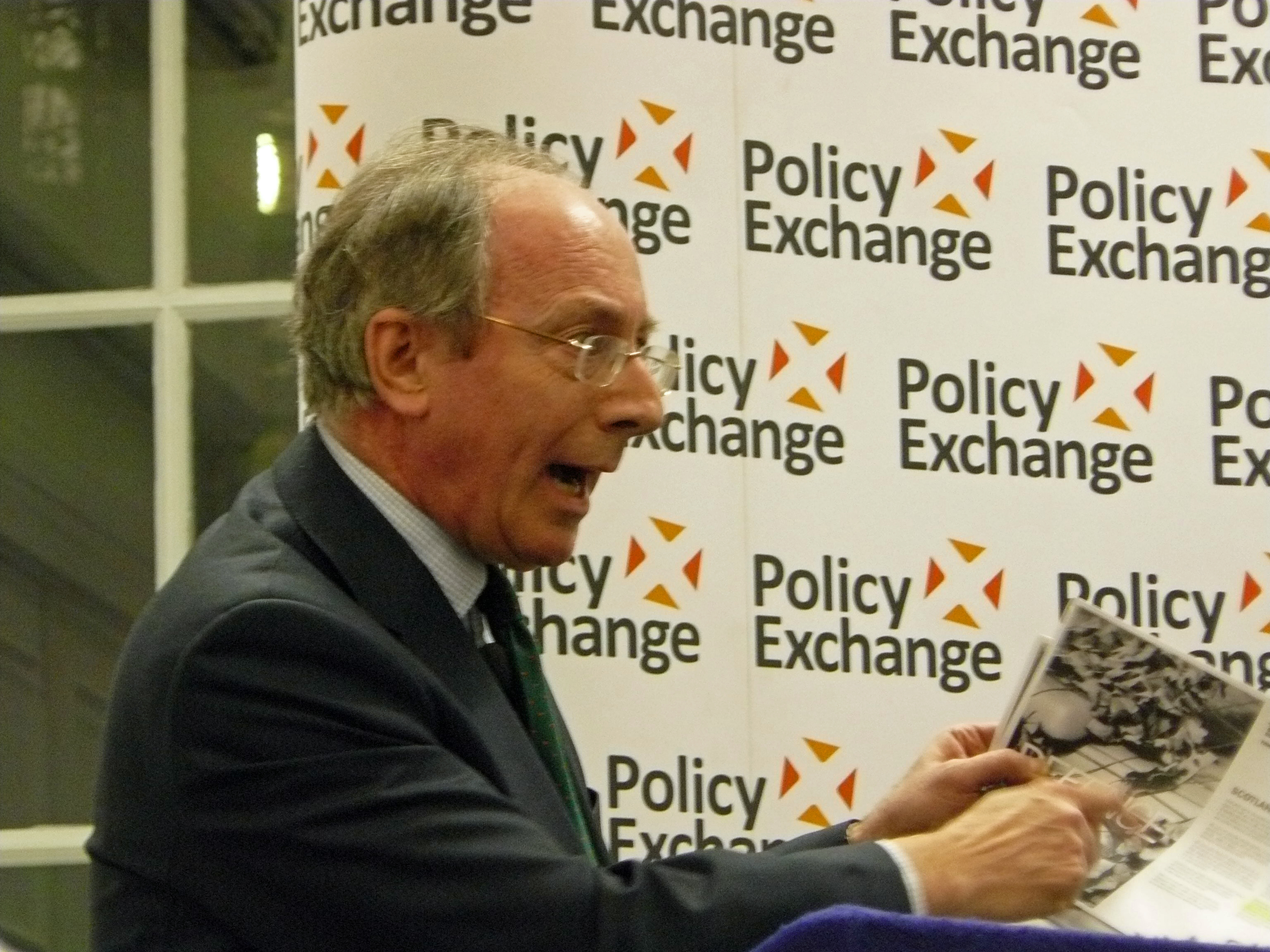
Rifkind speaking to Policy Exchange in 2012

In July 2010, he was appointed by the Secretary General of the Commonwealth as a member of the Eminent Persons Group, chaired by a former Prime Minister of Malaysia, which has been requested to report to the next Commonwealth Heads of Government Meeting on recommendations for the future revitalisation of the Commonwealth.

He was Chairman of the Standards and Privileges Committee of the House of Commons until the dissolution of Parliament on 12 April 2010. When the Kensington and Chelsea constituency was realigned to create the new seats of Chelsea and Fulham and Kensington, Rifkind stood for the latter seat and was elected at the 2010 general election with a 50.1% share of the total votes cast, and a majority of 8,616 votes.

=== Chairman of the Intelligence and Security Committee ===
Rifkind became chairman of the Intelligence and Security Committee on 6 July 2010, a post he held until 24 February 2015. As chairman of the ISC, Rifkind presided over the transformation of the committee's powers to ensure that it had effective oversight of MI5, MI6 and GCHQ. He persuaded the government to introduce legislation which enabled the ISC, for the first time, to be able to require, rather than request, the intelligence agencies to provide any highly classified material required by the ISC. The legislation also gave the ISC, for the first time, explicit authority to provide oversight over the operations of the intelligence agencies rather than just their policy, resources and organisation. During his period as chairman, the ISC held its first-ever public sessions including a live televised session with the heads of MI5, MI6, and GCHQ.

Rifkind supported the NATO military intervention in Libya and supplying arms to the Libyan rebels.

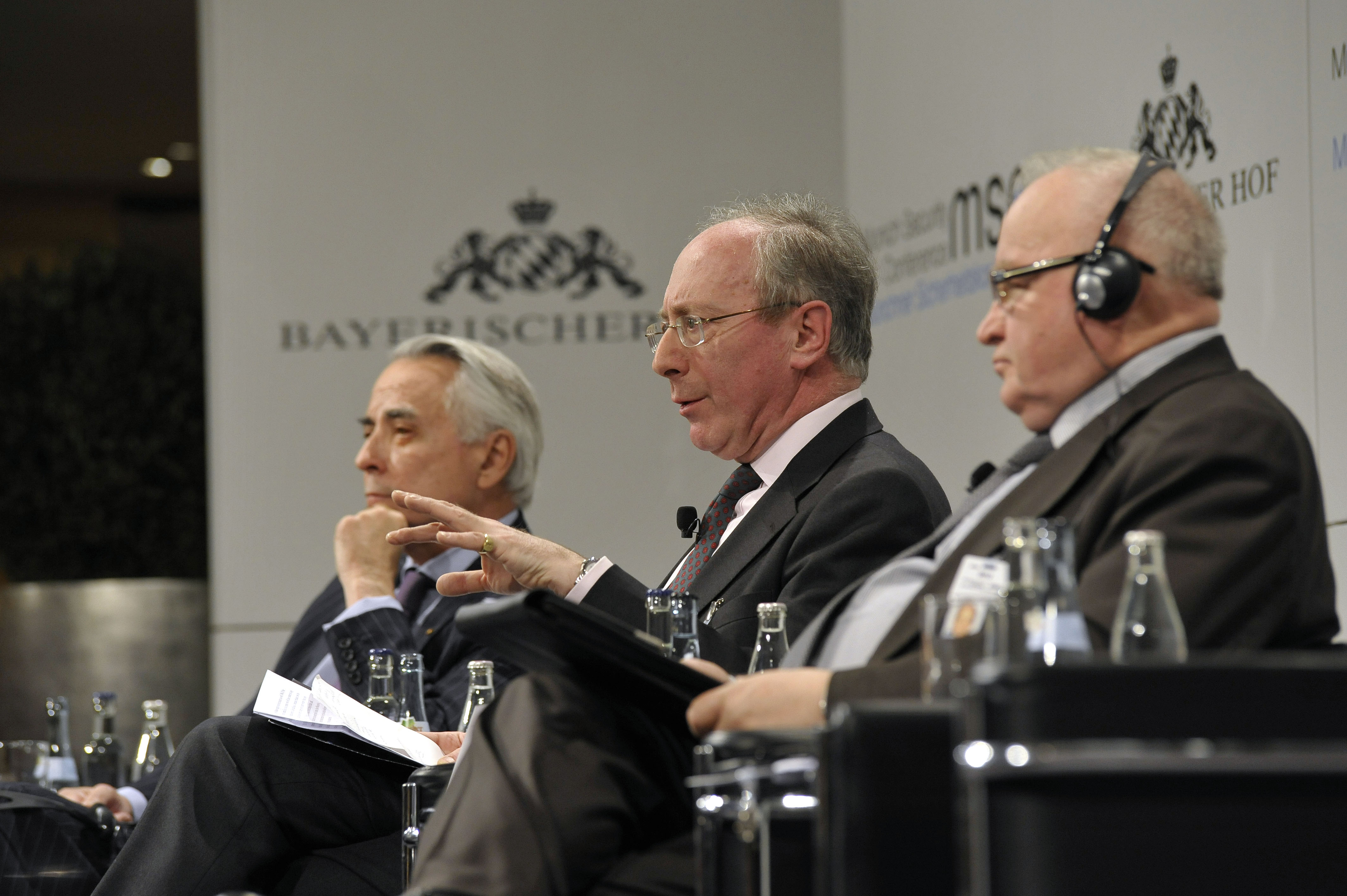
Rifkind with American businessman Richard Burt, 2012

On 28 August 2013, Rifkind appeared to modify his anti-war principles by advocating British military intervention in the Syrian civil war, subject to certain important caveats. He stated that the best response to proof of the Syrian Government's use of chemical weapons against its own people would be United Nations Security Council approval of proportionate and limited military action, but that securing unanimity in the Council would be unlikely, given the near-certainty of a Russian veto. He believed that, in such a case, if there were to be a broad international consensus for such military action, including among the nations of the Arab League, the international community should not be 'paralysed' by a failure to act, and that the action should be used to target Syrian Government military sites. He believed its purpose should be to deter the Syrian Government from using such weapons again, and to indicate that wider action would be undertaken were it to do so. Writing in The Guardian, he accused the government of Syrian President Bashar al-Assad of being willing to "do anything that they think they can get away with to stay in power", but then claimed that for Britain, in the event of broad international consensus for military action against the Syrian Government's use of chemical weapons, there was "no choice but to take military action with or without a UN mandate".

On 18 March 2014, during an interview with CBC Radio News, Rifkind spoke out against the Russian annexation of Crimea from Ukraine, stating that this risked destabilising the entire area and European politics in general. In his opinion, Ukrainian forces had demonstrated "remarkable restraint" against Russian "humiliation", and had turned their military disadvantage into a substantial "moral advantage". While declaring "robust economic sanctions" to be the best response to Crimean situation, and describing a number of possible options, he nevertheless referred to the Western implementation as "pathetic", claiming that current measures affected a mere 23 individuals, and inferred this to be the reason why Russia seemed unfazed by sanction threats. Because of his criticism of Russian action in Crimea and eastern Ukraine Rifkind was included in a list of senior European politicians and former Ministers banned from visiting Russia. Rifkind responded by saying that if there had to be such a list he was proud to be on it.

In November 2014, the ISC published its report on the murder of Lee Rigby, on which he said of Facebook:

This company does not regard themselves as under any obligation to ensure that they identify such threats, or to report them to the authorities. We find this unacceptable: however unintentionally, they are providing a safe haven for terrorists.

The obligatory internet rights group warned against co-opting companies and turning them into an arm of the surveillance state, and David Cameron vowed to take action. The committee noted the problem to be acute but were somewhat assuaged by the appointment of the Special Envoy on intelligence and law enforcement data sharing and by the Data Retention and Investigatory Powers Act 2014; they also suggested that government should prioritise the issue with the National Security Council.

=== Conflict of interest controversy ===
In early 2015, Rifkind had discussions with what he thought were representatives of a Chinese company that wanted to set up an advisory council. They turned out to be journalists for The Daily Telegraph and Channel 4 News who recorded the conversations. As a result, he was suspended from the Conservative party while the matter was investigated.

On 24 February 2015, Rifkind stepped down from his position as chairman of the Intelligence and Security Committee while remaining on the Committee. Shortly afterwards he announced that he would not stand as a candidate for his constituency of Kensington at the 2015 general election. Rifkind said it was "quite obvious" that allegations made following an undercover sting had "become an issue", and said he had stepped aside as chair of the parliamentary Intelligence and Security Committee (ISC) because he did not want the work of the committee to be "distracted". Speaking to reporters after a meeting of the ISC, he said: "I don't think I did anything wrong. I may have made errors of judgement, but that's a different matter." In September 2015 the Parliamentary Commissioner for Standards and the Standards Committee of Parliament concluded after a seven-month investigation that there had been no impropriety by Rifkind. They severely criticised Channel 4 Dispatches and the Daily Telegraph for "distortion", and for "misleading the public". Media regulator Ofcom took a different view, judging in December 2015 that the journalists had investigated a matter of significant public interest and that their presentation had been fair.

== Personal life ==
Rifkind married Edith Amalia, daughter of Polish airforce engineer Joseph Steinberg, in London in 1970. They had two children, Caroline and Hugo Rifkind a columnist for The Times. She died on 20 October 2019 at the age of 72.

He was also a distant cousin of his Conservative government colleague Leon Brittan.

== Other positions and memberships ==
In December 2020, the University of London appointed Rifkind as chairman of an Inquiry into the future of the Institute of Commonwealth Studies. The Committee concluded that the Institute should not be closed as originally proposed by the University but should continue and be expanded. The University accepted all the recommendations.

He is a trustee of the Dulverton Trust.

== Publications ==
- Power and Pragmatism, The Memoirs of Malcolm Rifkind, published by Biteback Publishing, July 2016
- The Politics of Land in Southern Rhodesia. Unpublished Master's Thesis for University of Edinburgh,1969
- Chapter 22, Open Door, NATO and Euro-Atlantic Security After the Cold War, published by Johns Hopkins University 2019
- British Diplomacy, Foreign Secretaries Reflect, Chapter 6, Sir Malcolm Rifkind, Politico's
- Rights and wrongs: The European Convention on Human Rights and its application in the United Kingdom (SSC biennial lecture) by Malcolm Rifkind (2000, Society of Solicitors in the Supreme Courts of Scotland) ISBN B0000CP0RH
- Head to Head on the Euro: Kenneth Clarke and Malcolm Rifkind edited by Janet Bush (2000, New Europe) ISBN 0-9536360-3-8
- Conservative Britain in the 21st century by Malcolm Rifkind (1996, Centre for Policy Studies) ISBN 1-897969-53-8
- Hume Occasional Paper No.46: UN Peacekeeping – Past Lessons and Future Prospects (Hume Occasional Papers) by Malcolm Rifkind (1995, The David Hume Institute) ISBN 1-870482-43-3
- Towards 2000 by Malcolm Rifkind (1988, Conservative Political Centre) ISBN 0-85070-788-9

Parliament of the United Kingdom
Preceded by Norman Wylie	Member of Parliament for Edinburgh Pentlands; 1974–1997	Succeeded by Lynda Clark
Preceded by Michael Portillo	Member of Parliament for Kensington and Chelsea; 2005–2010	Constituency abolished
New constituency	Member of Parliament for Kensington; 2010–2015	Succeeded by Victoria Borwick
Political offices
Preceded by Douglas Hurd	Minister of State for Europe; 1983–1986	Succeeded by Lynda Chalker
Preceded by George Younger	Secretary of State for Scotland; 1986–1990	Succeeded by Ian Lang
Preceded by Cecil Parkinson	Secretary of State for Transport; 1990–1992	Succeeded by John MacGregor
Preceded by Tom King	Secretary of State for Defence; 1992–1995	Succeeded by Michael Portillo
Preceded by Douglas Hurd	Foreign Secretary; 1995–1997	Succeeded by Robin Cook
Preceded by David Willetts	Shadow Secretary of State for Work and Pensions; 2005	Succeeded by Philip Hammond
