= Richard Keen, Baron Keen of Elie =

Scottish lawyer

The Right Honourable The Lord Keen of Elie PC KC
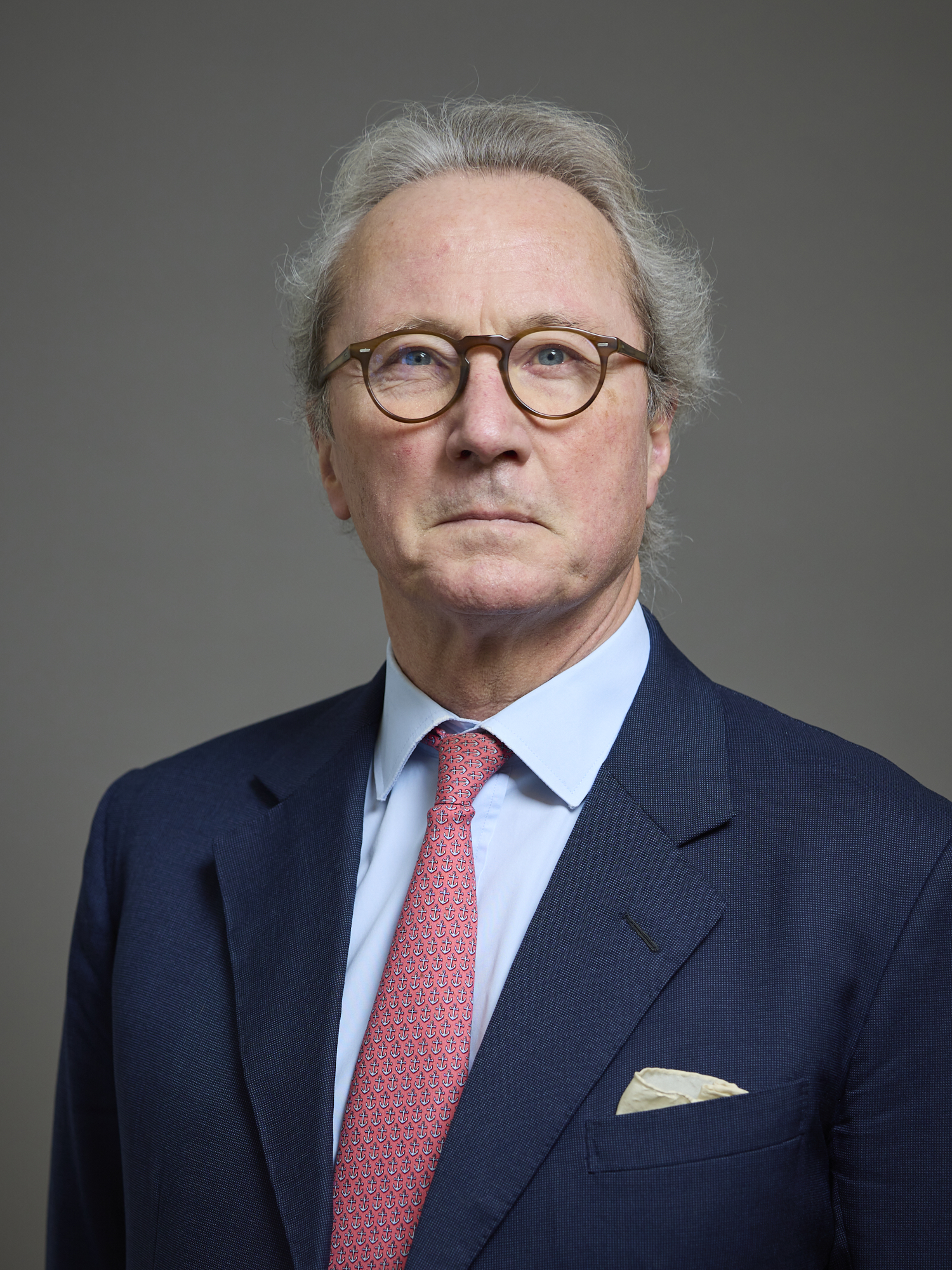
- Official portrait, 2025

Shadow Advocate General for Scotland
- Incumbent
- Assumed office 11 November 2024
- Leader: Kemi Badenoch
- Preceded by: The Lord Falconer of Thoroton (2021)

Shadow Minister for Justice
- Incumbent
- Assumed office 1 September 2024
- Leader: Rishi Sunak; Kemi Badenoch
- Preceded by: The Lord Ponsonby of Shulbrede

Advocate General for Scotland
- In office 29 May 2015 – 16 September 2020
- Prime Minister: David Cameron; Theresa May; Boris Johnson
- Preceded by: The Lord Wallace of Tankerness
- Succeeded by: The Lord Stewart of Dirleton

Government Spokesperson for the Ministry of Justice
- In office 18 July 2016 – 16 September 2020
- Leader: Theresa May; Boris Johnson
- Preceded by: The Lord Faulks (as Minister of State)
- Succeeded by: The Lord Wolfson of Tredegar (as Parliamentary Under-Secretary of State)

Government Spokesperson for the Home Office
- In office 1 April 2016 – 18 July 2016
- Prime Minister: David Cameron
- Preceded by: The Lord Bates (as Minister of State)
- Succeeded by: The Baroness Williams of Trafford (as Minister of State)

Chairman of the Scottish Conservative Party
- In office January 2014 – 28 May 2015
- Leader: Ruth Davidson
- Preceded by: David Mundell
- Succeeded by: Rab Forman

Member of the House of Lords
- Lord Temporal
- Life peerage 8 June 2015

Personal details
- Born: Richard Sanderson Keen; 29 March 1954 (age 72)
- Party: Conservative
- Spouse: Jane Anderson
- Children: 2
- Education: University of Edinburgh
- Profession: Advocate

Richard Sanderson Keen, Baron Keen of Elie PC, KC (born 29 March 1954) is a British lawyer and Conservative Party politician who served as Advocate General for Scotland from 2015 until his resignation in 2020. He has been Shadow Minister for Justice and Shadow Advocate General for Scotland since 2024.

== Early life ==
Keen was educated at The King's School, Rochester and Dollar Academy, and graduated LLB (with Honours) in law from the University of Edinburgh in 1976, where he was a Beckman scholar. He was admitted to the Faculty of Advocates in 1980 and took silk (QC) in 1993. He was admitted to the Bar of England and Wales in 2009 and elected a Bencher of the Middle Temple in 2011.

== Legal career ==
Keen served as standing junior counsel in Scotland to the Department of Trade and Industry from 1986 to 1993. He specialises in commercial law, property law and administrative law. He is also a member of Blackstone Chambers in Middle Temple, London.

He defended Al Amin Khalifa Fhimah at the Pan Am Flight 103 bombing trial, with Fhimah being acquitted of all charges. In 2007, he represented Henri Paul's family at the inquest into the death of Diana, Princess of Wales.

He represented Andy Coulson in relation to perjury charges.

He has regularly appeared in the Supreme Court of the United Kingdom. In 2016, he appeared for the United Kingdom Government in the R (Miller) v Secretary of State for Exiting the European Union ("Article 50 case") where he successfully argued that there was no constitutional requirement for the devolved administrations to consent to Brexit.

Keen was elected Dean of the Faculty of Advocates (leader of the Scottish Bar) in 2007. He remained Dean until January 2014 when he resigned to become chair of the Scottish Conservative Party, having been chosen in November 2013 to succeed David Mundell MP.

He was appointed the Advocate General for Scotland on 29 May 2015, and stepped down as chair of the Scottish Conservative Party. In May 2016 he was also appointed Lords Minister for the Ministry of Justice with policy responsibility for civil justice in England and Wales and regulation and promotion of the legal profession in England and Wales. In September 2017, he was appointed Minister for the Crown Dependencies.

Keen was created a Life Peer on 8 June 2015 taking the title Baron Keen of Elie, of Elie in Fife. On 15 November 2017 Lord Keen of Elie was sworn as a Member of the Privy Council.

On 16 September 2020, Keen offered his resignation over the United Kingdom Internal Market Bill, stating that he found it difficult to reconcile parts of it with the law.

Keen was a member of the House of Lords Select Committee on the Constitution from 2022 to 2024.

On 12 January 2022 Keen was appointed a member of the UK delegation to the Parliamentary Assembly of the Council of Europe at Strasbourg. On 23 January 2024 Keen was elected Chair of the Legal Affairs and Human Rights Committee of the Parliamentary Assembly of the Council of Europe (PACE); a member of the Judicial Appointments Committee of PACE and a member of the Bureau of PACE.

In September 2024, Keen was appointed to the Shadow Front Bench in the House of Lords as Shadow Minister for Justice under Rishi Sunak. He was subsequently appointed Shadow Advocate General for Scotland under Kemi Badenoch in November of the same year.

== Personal life ==
Keen is married and has two children. He was reported to be one of the highest earners in Scotland, being featured on a list of the top 100 earners in 2003. In 2017, Keen was charged with contravening section two of the Firearms Act 1968 by failing to safely secure a shotgun, to which he pleaded guilty and was fined. A hearing of the Bar Tribunals and Adjudication Service in 2019 found that the offence did not amount to professional misconduct.

Legal offices
| Preceded by The Lord Wallace of Tankerness | Advocate General for Scotland; 2015 – 2020 | Succeeded by The Lord Stewart of Dirleton |
Orders of precedence in the United Kingdom
| Preceded by The Lord Prior of Brampton | Gentlemen; Baron Keen of Elie | Followed by The Lord Blunkett |
