= Lord Clark =

Lord Clark or Lord Clarke may refer to:

- Kenneth Clark, Baron Clark, British television broadcaster
- David Clark, Baron Clark of Windermere, British politician
- Alistair Clark, Lord Clark, Senator of the College of Justice in Scotland since 2016
- Tony Clarke, Baron Clarke of Hampstead (born 1932), known as Tony Clarke, British trade unionist and Labour peer
- Kenneth Clarke, Baron Clarke of Nottingham (born 1940), long-serving British MP and minister
- Tony Clarke, Baron Clarke of Stone-cum-Ebony, (born 1943), English judge
- Matthew Clarke, Lord Clarke, Scottish judge

== See also ==
- Baroness Clark (disambiguation)
