= Advocate General for Scotland =

Scottish law officer of the Crown

United Kingdom Advocate General for Scotland
- Royal Coat of Arms used by the Monarch in Scotland

- Flag of Scotland

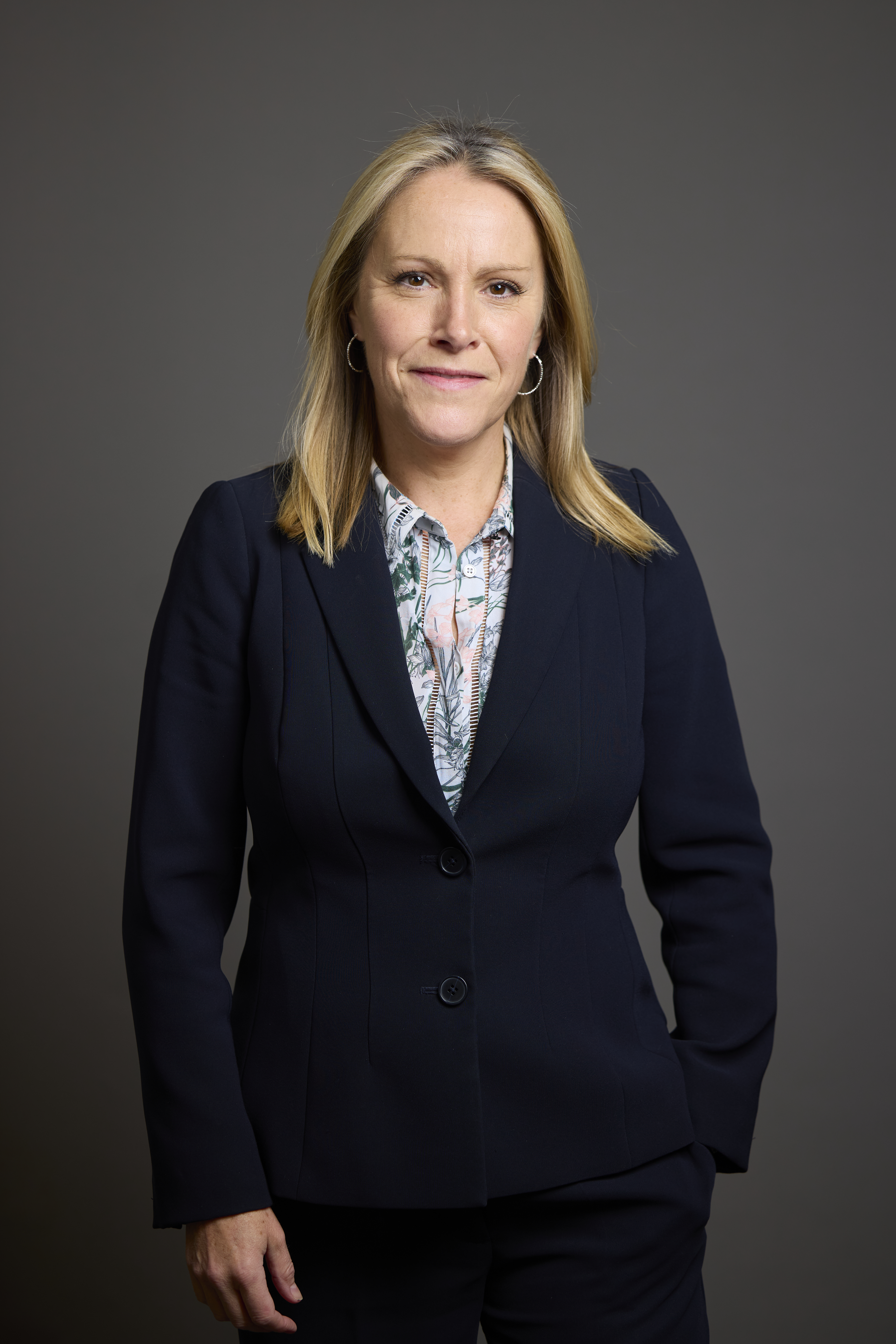
- Incumbent; Catherine Smith, Baroness Smith of Cluny since 29 August 2024
- Office of the Advocate General for Scotland
- Style: The Right Honourable
- Reports to: Prime Minister
- Appointer: The King (on the advice of the Prime Minister)
- Term length: At His Majesty's pleasure
- Formation: 1999

His Majesty's Advocate General for Scotland is one of the Law Officers of the Crown, whose duty it is to advise the Crown and His Majesty's Government on Scots law on reserved matters only. As a consequence, their jurisdiction over Scots law is limited, with the majority of power and decision making being the responsibility of the Lord Advocate in their capacity as the chief legal adviser and public prosecutor for the Scottish Government.

The Office of the Advocate General for Scotland is a ministerial department of the Government of the United Kingdom. The position is currently occupied by Catherine Smith, Baroness Smith of Cluny.

== History ==
The office of Advocate General for Scotland was created in 1999 by the Scotland Act 1998 to be the chief legal adviser to the United Kingdom Government on Scots law. This function had previously been carried out by the Lord Advocate and Solicitor General for Scotland, who were transferred to the Scottish Government on the establishment of the Scottish Parliament. The office of the Advocate General for Scotland should not be confused with that of "His Majesty's Advocate", which is the term used for the Lord Advocate in Scottish criminal proceedings.

== List of Advocates General for Scotland ==
The first holder of the office was Lynda Clark, then Member of Parliament for Edinburgh Pentlands and from 2005 a member of the House of Lords as Baroness Clark of Calton. On 18 January 2006, Baroness Clark resigned to take up office as a Senator of the College of Justice, a judge of the Supreme Courts of Scotland.

The office was then vacant until 15 March of that year when, under section 87 of the Scotland Act 1998, its functions were temporarily conferred on the Secretary of State for Scotland, Alistair Darling MP, himself a Scottish advocate.

There had been substantial criticism from the judiciary and others of the length of time the office had been left vacant. On 21 March, however, it was announced Neil Davidson, former Solicitor General for Scotland, had been appointed Advocate General. He was created a life peer, as Baron Davidson of Glen Clova, on 22 March 2006.

On 14 May 2010, Jim Wallace, Baron Wallace of Tankerness, a former Deputy First Minister of Scotland, was appointed by the coalition government.

Richard Keen was appointed Advocate General in David Cameron's majority government on 29 May 2015, and has retained the post through two subsequent prime ministers to 2020. He was created a life peer, as Baron Keen of Elie, on 8 June 2015. He resigned on 16 September 2020 citing concerns arising from the UK Internal Market Bill, noting in his letter of resignation to Boris Johnson that he found it "increasingly difficult to reconcile what I consider to be my obligations as a Law Officer with your policy intentions".

Keith Stewart was appointed to succeed Keen on 15 October 2020. Catherine Smith was appointed to the office and a life peerage by the Starmer government on 29 August 2024.

Advocate General for Scotland
Portrait	Name (birth–death)	Term of office		Party	Ministry	Ref.
	Lynda Clark; Baroness Clark of Calton (Note: MP for Edinburgh Pentlands until 2005; created Baroness Clark of Calton thereafter) (born 1949)	19 May 1999	18 January 2006	Labour	Blair I	
	Lynda Clark; Baroness Clark of Calton (born 1949)	19 May 1999	18 January 2006	Labour	Blair II	
	Neil Davidson; Baron Davidson of Glen Clova (born 1950)	21 March 2006	11 May 2010	Labour	Blair II	
	Neil Davidson; Baron Davidson of Glen Clova (born 1950)	21 March 2006	11 May 2010	Labour	Blair III	
	Neil Davidson; Baron Davidson of Glen Clova (born 1950)	21 March 2006	11 May 2010	Labour	Brown	
	Jim Wallace; Baron Wallace of Tankerness (1954–2026)	14 May 2010	8 May 2015	Liberal; Democrat	Cameron–Clegg (Con.–LD)	
	Richard Keen; Baron Keen of Elie (born 1954)	29 May 2015	16 September 2020	Conservative	Cameron II	
	Richard Keen; Baron Keen of Elie (born 1954)	29 May 2015	16 September 2020	Conservative	May I	
	Richard Keen; Baron Keen of Elie (born 1954)	29 May 2015	16 September 2020	Conservative	May II	
	Richard Keen; Baron Keen of Elie (born 1954)	29 May 2015	16 September 2020	Conservative	Johnson I	
	Richard Keen; Baron Keen of Elie (born 1954)	29 May 2015	16 September 2020	Conservative	Johnson II	
	Keith Stewart; Baron Stewart of Dirleton (born 1965)	15 October 2020	5 July 2024	Conservative	Johnson II	
	Keith Stewart; Baron Stewart of Dirleton (born 1965)	15 October 2020	5 July 2024	Conservative	Truss	
	Keith Stewart; Baron Stewart of Dirleton (born 1965)	15 October 2020	5 July 2024	Conservative	Sunak	
	Catherine Smith; Baroness Smith of Cluny (born 1973)	29 August 2024	present	Labour	Starmer	
	Catherine Smith; Baroness Smith of Cluny (born 1973)	29 August 2024	present	Labour	Burnham	

== Organisation ==
The office has a staff of around 40.

All staff are on secondment or loan from other government organisations, mainly the Scottish Government and the Ministry of Justice.

Offices of the Advocate General

- Advocate General's Private Office, based in London
- Legal Secretariat to the Advocate General (LSAG), based in London
  - Legal Secretary to the Advocate General
- Office of the Advocate General (OAG), based in Edinburgh
  - Solicitor to the Advocate General
    - Head of Litigation Division (Scots law)
    - Head of Advisory & Legislation Division (Primary legislation, subordinate legislation, Scotland Act draft orders)
    - Head of HMRC Division

== See also ==
- Advocate General
- Lord Advocate
- Attorney General for England and Wales
- Attorney General for Northern Ireland
