= Jim Wallace, Baron Wallace of Tankerness =

Scottish politician (1954–2026)

The Right Honourable The Lord Wallace of Tankerness PC KC FRSE
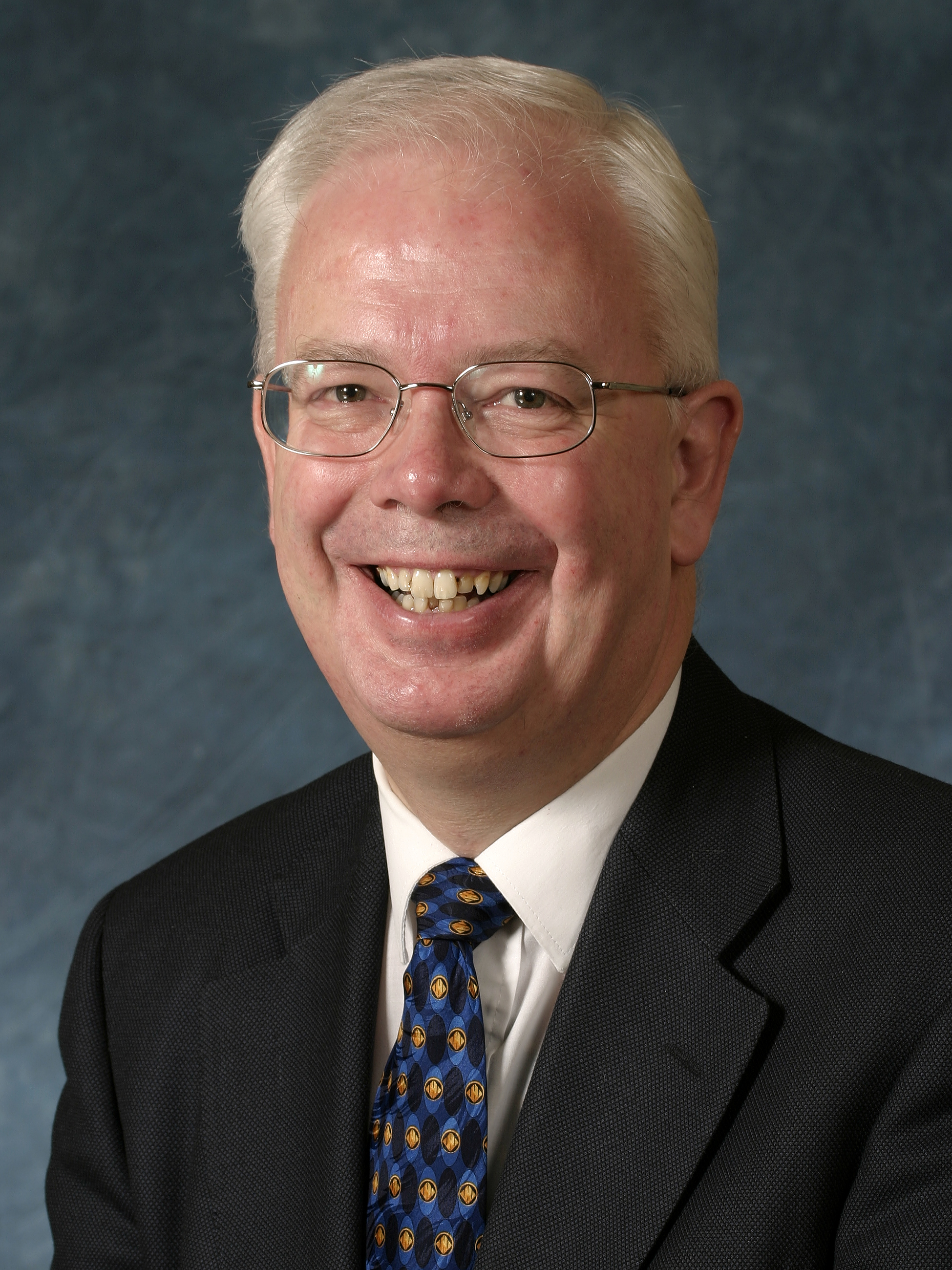
- Official portrait, 2003

First Minister of Scotland
- Acting; 8 November 2001 – 27 November 2001
- Monarch: Elizabeth II
- Preceded by: Henry McLeish
- Succeeded by: Jack McConnell
- Acting; 11 October 2000 – 27 October 2000
- Monarch: Elizabeth II
- Preceded by: Donald Dewar
- Succeeded by: Henry McLeish

Deputy First Minister of Scotland
- In office 19 May 1999 – 23 June 2005
- First Minister: Donald Dewar; Himself (acting); Henry McLeish; Himself (acting); Jack McConnell
- Preceded by: Office established
- Succeeded by: Nicol Stephen

Leader of the Scottish Liberal Democrats
- In office 18 April 1992 – 23 June 2005
- Deputy: Michael Moore (from 2002)
- UK party leader: Paddy Ashdown; Charles Kennedy
- President: Russell Johnston; Malcolm Bruce
- Preceded by: Malcolm Bruce
- Succeeded by: Nicol Stephen
Ministerial offices
Advocate General for Scotland
In office 14 May 2010 – 8 May 2015
Prime Minister	David Cameron
Preceded by	The Lord Davidson of Glen Clova
Succeeded by	The Lord Keen of Elie
Deputy Leader of the House of Lords
In office 15 October 2013 – 8 May 2015
Prime Minister	David Cameron
Leader	The Lord Hill of Oareford; The Baroness Stowell of Beeston
Preceded by	The Lord McNally
Succeeded by	The Earl Howe
Minister for Enterprise and Lifelong Learning
In office 21 May 2003 – 27 June 2005
First Minister	Jack McConnell
Preceded by	Iain Gray (Enterprise, Transport and Lifelong Learning)
Succeeded by	Nicol Stephen
Minister for Justice
In office 19 May 1999 – 21 May 2003
First Minister	Donald Dewar; Himself (acting); Henry McLeish; Himself (acting); Jack McConnell
Preceded by	Office established
Succeeded by	Cathy Jamieson
Parliamentary offices
Member of the House of Lords
Lord Temporal
Life peerage 17 October 2007 – 29 January 2026
Member of the Scottish Parliament for Orkney
In office 6 May 1999 – 2 April 2007
Preceded by	Constituency established
Succeeded by	Liam McArthur
Member of Parliament for Orkney and Shetland
In office 9 June 1983 – 14 May 2001
Preceded by	Jo Grimond
Succeeded by	Alistair Carmichael

Liberal Democrat portfolios
- 1988–1992: Chief Whip
- 2013–2016: Leader in the House of Lords

Liberal portfolios
- 1987–1988: Chief Whip

Personal details
- Born: James Robert Wallace; 25 August 1954 Annan, Dumfriesshire, Scotland
- Died: 29 January 2026 (aged 71) Edinburgh, Scotland
- Party: Liberal Democrats
- Other political affiliations: Liberal
- Spouse: Rosemary Fraser (m. 1983)
- Education: Annan Academy; Downing College, Cambridge (BA); University of Edinburgh (LLB)

James Robert Wallace, Baron Wallace of Tankerness, PC, KC, FRSE (25 August 1954 – 29 January 2026) was a Scottish politician who served as a Liberal Democrat life peer in the House of Lords from 2007 until his death in 2026. He had previously served as Deputy First Minister of Scotland from 1999 to 2005, and during that time was twice acting First Minister, in 2000, in the aftermath of Donald Dewar's death, and in 2001, following Henry McLeish's resignation.

Wallace was Leader of the Scottish Liberal Democrats from 1992 to 2005 and Leader of the Liberal Democrats in the House of Lords from 2013 to 2016.

Wallace served as a Liberal Democrat Member of Parliament (MP) for Orkney and Shetland from 1983 to 2001 and a Member of the Scottish Parliament (MSP) for Orkney from 1999 to 2007. He was Advocate General for Scotland from 2010 to 2015. He was Moderator of the General Assembly of the Church of Scotland from 2021 to 2022 and for the duration of this appointment, he gave up his political affiliation.

== Early life and education ==
Wallace was born in Annan in Dumfriesshire, Scotland, to John and Grace Wallace, on 25 August 1954, and grew up there. His father, an accountant, was an elder for 64 years in the local Church of Scotland congregation, Annan Old Parish Church. He was involved in both the Boys Brigade and Scripture Union groups. He professed faith and formally joined the church while a student in 1973.

As a boy, his first interest in politics was stoked when he collected autographs from politicians visiting the local area: as of 2005, he still possessed one from Tam Dalyell.

He was educated at Annan Academy, a state secondary school in his hometown of Annan. Following school, he was accepted by Downing College, Cambridge, where he obtained a joint BA degree in economics and law. Wallace was initially a Conservative, part of the left-leaning Pressure for Economic and Social Toryism group, but switched to the Liberals whilst at Cambridge where he served as chairman of the Cambridge Liberal Club.

From there he returned to Scotland to study law at the University of Edinburgh, graduating with an LLB degree in 1977. Based in Edinburgh, he became a barrister in 1979, and he practised as an advocate at the Scottish Bar, mostly in civil law cases.

== Political career ==
=== Member of Parliament (UK) ===
Wallace joined the then-Liberal Party in the early 1970s, but did not become very active in it until after completing his second degree. His first foray as a parliamentary candidate was in the constituency of Dumfriesshire in 1979, where he failed to win, coming third of four candidates with 14.3% of the vote. He also stood, unsuccessfully, as the Liberal candidate in the South of Scotland constituency at the European Parliament elections of that year.

Four years later, he was selected as the Liberal nomination for the seat of Orkney and Shetland, the seat being vacated by former party leader Jo Grimond, and won election to the Parliament. At the time, it was extremely rare for Liberal candidates to successfully win elections to succeed former Liberal MPs, although many have since done so. He was to serve as the MP there for 18 years, occupying a number of front bench posts for the Liberal Party (and, from 1988 onwards, the Liberal Democrats), including Employment spokesman and Chief Whip.

In 1992, he was unopposed in becoming the new leader of the Scottish Liberal Democrats, succeeding Malcolm Bruce. Scottish politics at this time was dominated by the question of constitutional reform. There were few opportunities for legislation affecting Scots Law to be debated or effectively scrutinised at Westminster and, especially after the 1987 election, with only ten Conservative MPs in Scotland but with a large majority in the House of Commons, it was argued that there was a democratic deficit in Scotland. He was appointed Queen's Counsel (QC) in 1997.

He led the Scottish Liberal Democrats in the first election to the new Scottish Parliament in 1999, himself winning the constituency of Orkney with 67% of the votes cast. This meant he served as a Member of both the Scottish and Westminster Parliaments for a time with a dual mandate, although like other MPs elected to Holyrood (such as John Swinney, John Home Robertson and Donald Gorrie) he stood down from Westminster at the 2001 general election.

=== Member of the Scottish Parliament ===
As expected, the proportional election system for the new Scottish Parliament meant that Labour failed to gain an outright majority in the first elections. Their leader, Donald Dewar, chose to seek a formal coalition government with a working majority rather than try to operate as a minority government.

==== Deputy First Minister ====
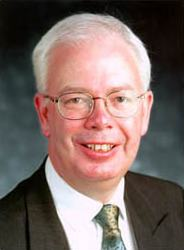
Official deputy first minister portrait, 1999

Dewar contacted Wallace and a week of formal negotiations were held between the two parties' representatives, following which a partnership agreement was signed, committing both parties to support a negotiated joint agenda. Wallace became Deputy First Minister and Minister for Justice, and maintained these briefs throughout the first term of the Parliament. The decision to enter a coalition government with Labour was controversial at the time. British politicians were unaccustomed to coalition politics, and the Liberal Democrats came under fire from Conservative and SNP opponents who claimed they had 'sold out' their principles. Key to this criticism was the Labour policy of making students pay tuition fees, which the Liberal Democrats had promised to abolish as their price of entering a coalition, but which became merely the subject of an inquiry as the coalition was formed. In the event, the Liberal Democrats did insist on the abolition of tuition fees after the inquiry reported in 2001, but in 1999, the delay was perceived to have been a compromise, and Wallace in particular became the focal point for extremely bitter criticism. Despite this, and other difficult moments, he and his party stayed firm and remained in power. Wallace established himself as a minister.

==== Acting First Minister ====
On three occasions over the first term of the Parliament, he became Acting First Minister: twice in 2000 due to at first the illness and later the death, of the first First Minister Donald Dewar, and then again in 2001, after the resignation of Dewar's successor as First Minister, Henry McLeish. In the first instance, Dewar returned to office in less than four months. Under his continued leadership, the Scottish Liberal Democrats' popularity grew steadily. After leading the party through the second Holyrood elections in 2003 Elections, again winning 17 MSPs but with a higher share of the vote, he led the party into a second coalition with Labour. The 2003 coalition negotiation process was widely seen as a more successful enterprise by the Liberal Democrats than the preceding one, with key aspects of Labour's proposals on anti-social behaviour dropped or limited, and with the promise of proportional representation for Scotland's 32 local councils. Wallace remained as Deputy First Minister, but left the Justice brief, becoming instead the Minister for Enterprise and Lifelong Learning.

=== Resignation and peerage ===
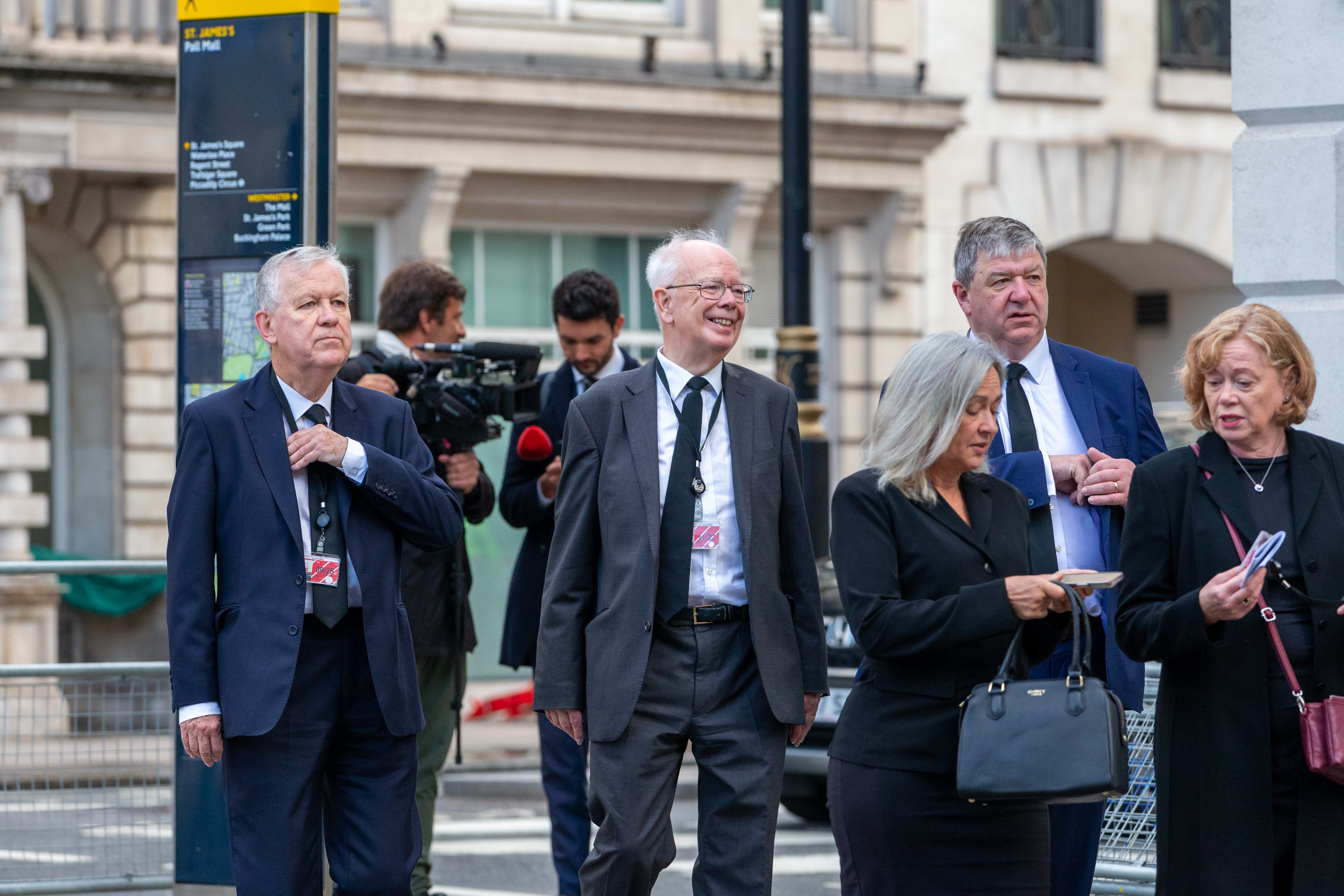
Wallace at the Accession Council of King Charles III, September 2022

On 9 May 2005, following the 2005 General Election, Wallace announced his intention to stand down as party leader and Deputy First Minister. He would remain as MSP for Orkney until the 2007 election, but would serve his time out as a backbencher. He ceased to be an MSP with the dissolution of the Scottish Parliament on 2 April 2007. On 13 September 2007, it was announced that he was to be appointed to the House of Lords. He was subsequently created a life peer on 17 October 2007 taking the title Baron Wallace of Tankerness, of Tankerness in Orkney.

On 28 April 2008, it was announced that the new Lord Wallace would be a member of the Commission on Scottish Devolution, chaired by Sir Kenneth Calman, established by the Scottish Parliament to consider the future powers of the Parliament, including powers over finance. In November 2008, Wallace received a lifetime achievement award in the Scottish Politician of the Year Awards.

In March 2010, Wallace briefly returned to the bar. In May 2010, he was appointed Advocate General for Scotland, one of the Law Officers of the Crown, who advise the government on Scots law.

He was elected unopposed, as the leader of the Liberal Democrats in the House of Lords on 15 October 2013, replacing Lord McNally, who had stepped down earlier in the month. In September 2016, he stepped down as the Leader of the Liberal Democrat in the House of Lords, citing a desire to step back from "frontline" politics stating "I was first elected to the House of Commons 33 years ago. For 28 of these years, I have been on the frontline, including sixteen years in a leadership role, here in the Lords and in Scotland."

Wallace was chair of the charity Reprieve until 2021, when he was succeeded in that role by Elish Angiolini.

== Moderator of the General Assembly of the Church of Scotland ==
A longstanding Elder of the Church of Scotland at St. Magnus Cathedral, Kirkwall, he was nominated and appointed to be Moderator of the General Assembly of the Church of Scotland for 2021–2022. It is highly unusual for a lay person to be nominated as Moderator, predecessors being Alison Elliot in 2004 and George Buchanan in 1567.

== Personal life and death ==
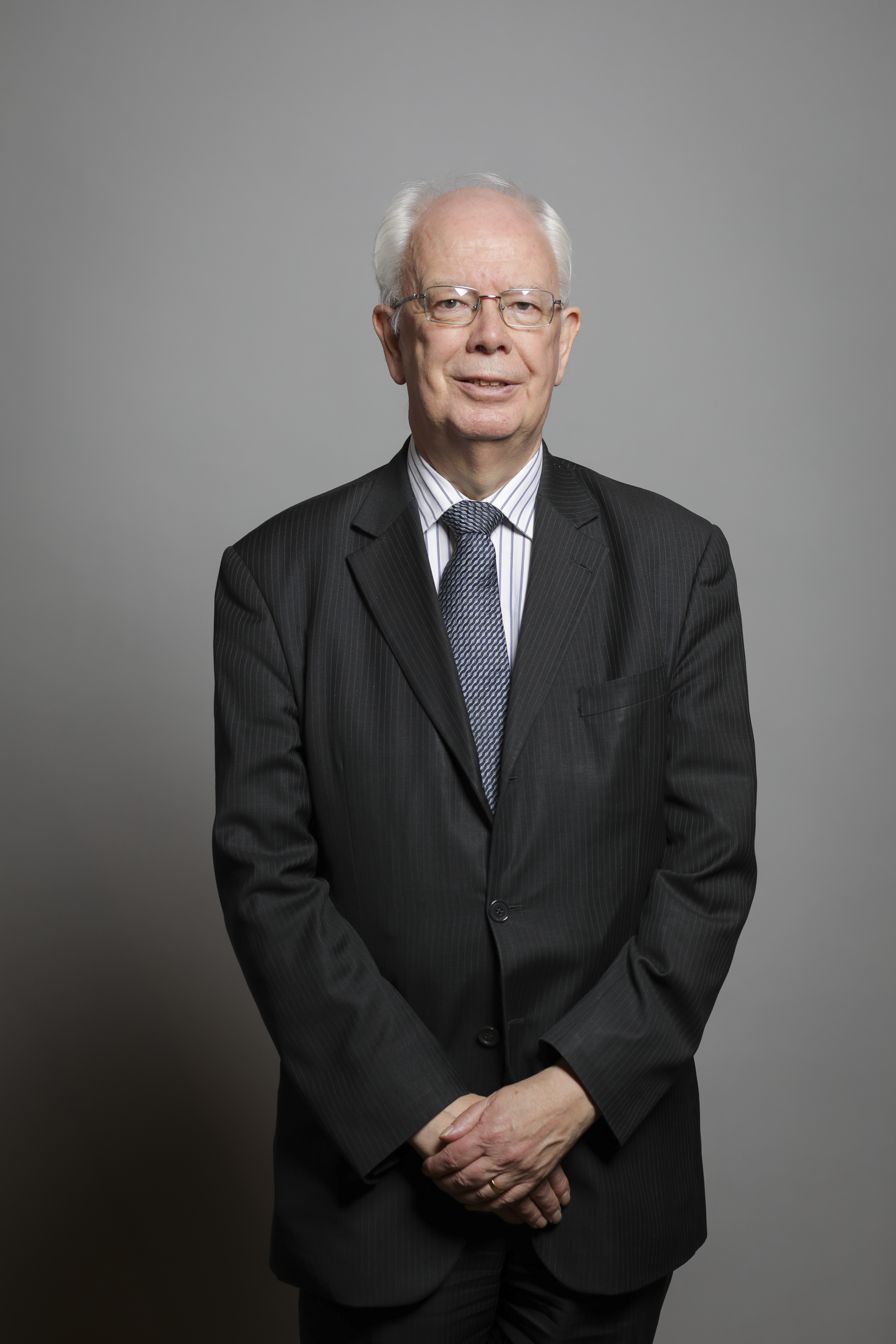
Official portrait, 2019

In 1983, Wallace married Rosemary (née Fraser), a speech therapist whom he called "Rosie". The couple had two daughters, Helen and Clare, and grandchildren.

He was an elder of the Church of Scotland. He was first ordained in what was St Bernard's Church in Stockbridge, Edinburgh, in 1981. By 1990, he was inducted to the eldership at St Magnus Cathedral in Kirkwall, Orkney, where he became a member of the church. He was active in contributing to public worship. Wallace was also a Vice President of the National Churches Trust. He was a keen singer, being a member of the choirs at both St Magnus Cathedral and Dunblane Cathedral.

In 2023 he survived aortic dissection, needing to undergo major surgery.

He had undergone a procedure at the Royal Infirmary of Edinburgh, but Wallace died from complications from that surgery on 29 January 2026, at the age of 71. He was survived by his wife, Rosie; his daughters, Helen and Clare - along with their families, his brother, Neil, and his mother, Grace, who still lives in Annan.

His funeral was held on the morning of 10 February 2026 at St Magnus Cathedral, and was conducted by Rev Dr Marjory MacLean, who had served as one of his chaplains during his year as Moderator. In place of the current moderator, former Moderator, Iain Torrance, was in attendance. Numerous politicians attended his funeral, including First Minister John Swinney, as well and the UK and Scottish Liberal Democrat leaders, Ed Davey and Alex Cole-Hamilton. During the funeral, Liberal Democrat MSP Liam McArthur, and MP Alastair Carmichael gave eulogies. Lord Wallace's brother Neil also addressed mourners in the cathedral. Following the funeral, he was interred at a private service at St Andrew's Cemetery in Tankerness. A thanksgiving service was held for him in June 2026 at Dunblane Cathedral .

== Honours and awards ==
Wallace received an Honorary Doctorate from Heriot-Watt University in 2007.

In 2018, Wallace was elected a Fellow of the Royal Society of Edinburgh (FRSE).

== See also ==
- List of Scottish Executive Ministerial Teams

Parliament of the United Kingdom
Preceded by Jo Grimond	Member of Parliament for Orkney and Shetland; 1983–2001	Succeeded by Alistair Carmichael
Party political offices
Preceded by David Alton	Liberal Chief Whip in the House of Commons; 1987–1988	Position abolished
New office	Liberal Democrat Chief Whip in the House of Commons; 1988–1992	Succeeded by Archy Kirkwood
Preceded by Malcolm Bruce	Leader of the Scottish Liberal Democrats; 1992–2005	Succeeded by Nicol Stephen
Preceded by The Lord McNally	Leader of the Liberal Democrats in the House of Lords; 2013–2016	Succeeded by Richard Newby
Scottish Parliament
New constituency	Member of the Scottish Parliament for Orkney; 1999–2007	Succeeded by Liam McArthur
Political offices
New office	Deputy First Minister of Scotland; 1999–2005	Succeeded by Nicol Stephen
New office	Minister for Justice; 1999–2003	Succeeded by Cathy Jamieson
Preceded by Donald Dewar	First Minister of Scotland; Acting; 2000	Succeeded by Henry McLeish
Preceded by Henry McLeish	First Minister of Scotland; Acting; 2001	Succeeded by Jack McConnell
Preceded by Iain Gray as Minister for Enterprise, Transport and Lifelong Learning	Minister for Enterprise and Lifelong Learning; 2003–2005	Succeeded by Nicol Stephen
Preceded by The Lord McNally	Deputy Leader of the House of Lords; 2013–2015	Succeeded by The Earl Howe
Legal offices
Preceded by The Lord Davidson of Glen Clova	Advocate General for Scotland; 2010–2015	Succeeded by The Lord Keen of Elie
Religious titles
Preceded by Martin Fair	Moderator of the General Assembly of the Church of Scotland; 2021–2022	Succeeded by Iain Greenshields
