= Edinburgh Pentlands (UK Parliament constituency) =

Parliamentary constituency in the United Kingdom, 1950–2005

- Former burgh constituency for the House of Commons
- Boundary of Edinburgh Pentlands in Scotland for the 2001 general election
- Major settlements: Edinburgh

1950–2005
- Seats: One
- Created from: Midlothian and Peebles Northern and Edinburgh South
- Replaced by: Edinburgh South West; Edinburgh South (Part)

Edinburgh Pentlands was a constituency of the House of Commons of the Parliament of the United Kingdom, first used in the general election of 1950, and abolished prior to the general election of 2005. It elected one Member of Parliament (MP) by the first past the post system of election.

In 1999, the Edinburgh Pentlands Scottish Parliament constituency was created with the same name and boundaries, and continues in use.

== Boundaries ==
1950–1955: The Colinton, Gorgie-Dalry, Merchiston and Sighthill wards of the county of the city of Edinburgh.

1955–1974: The Colinton, Merchiston and Sighthill wards of the county of the city of Edinburgh, and part of the Gorgie-Dalry ward.

1974–1983: The Colinton and Sighthill wards of the county of the city of Edinburgh, and part of the Merchiston ward.

1983–1997: Electoral divisions 10 (Balerno/Baberton), 24 (Hailes), 25 (Sighthill/Longstone), 35 (Colinton/Firrhill) and 36 (Braidburn/Fairmilehead) in the City of Edinburgh.

1997–2005: Electoral divisions 10 (Balerno/Baberton), 22 (Longstone/Craiglockhart), 30 (Sighthill/Broomhouse), 31 (Colinton/Firrhill), and 35 (Braidburn/Fairmilehead) in the City of Edinburgh.

In 2005, prior to the general election, the Westminster constituency was one of six covering the City of Edinburgh council area. Five were entirely within the city council area. One, Edinburgh East and Musselburgh, straddled the boundary with the East Lothian council area, to take in Musselburgh. Edinburgh Pentlands covered a south-western portion of the city council area.

In terms of wards used for elections to the City of Edinburgh Council, 1999 to 2007, Edinburgh Pentlands included wards named Balerno, Baberton, Colinton, Craiglockhart, Fairmilehead, Firrhill, Murrayburn, Parkhead, and Sighthill. The South Morningside ward was split between Edinburgh Pentlands and Edinburgh South. The seat had an urban north and a suburban centre. The remaining area was rural, and included a Pentland Hills area in the south.

In 2005, most of the constituency became part of Edinburgh South West. The Fairmilehead and South Morningside wards went to Edinburgh South. For the 2005 election, there were five constituencies covering the city area, all entirely within that area.

== Members of Parliament ==
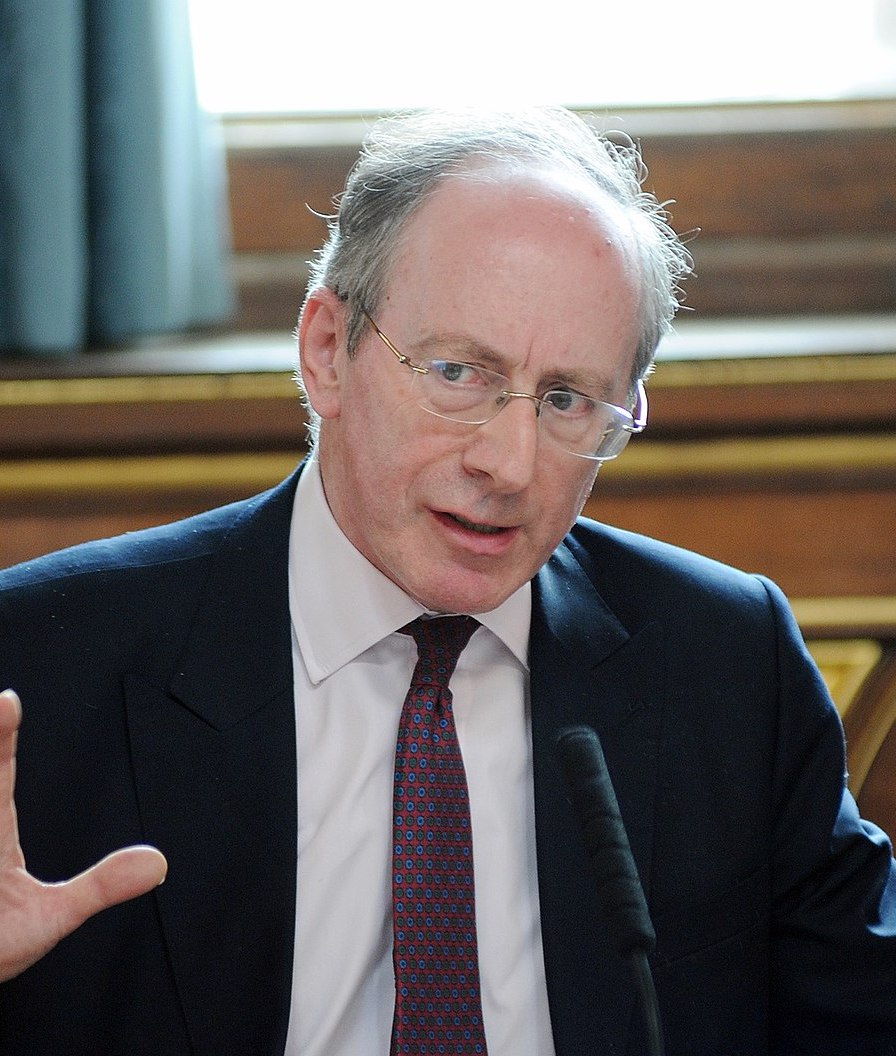
Malcolm Rifkind was the longest serving MP for Edinburgh Pentlands, serving from 1974 to 1997.

| Election | Member | Party |
|---|---|---|
| 1950 | Lord John Hope | Unionist |
| 1964 | Norman Wylie | Unionist |
| 1965 | Norman Wylie | Conservative |
| Feb 1974 | Malcolm Rifkind | Conservative |
| 1997 | Lynda Clark | Labour |
| 2005 | constituency abolished: see Edinburgh South West & Edinburgh South | |

== Elections ==
=== Elections in the 1950s ===
General election 1950: Edinburgh Pentlands
| Party | Candidate | Votes | % |
|---|---|---|---|
| Unionist | John Hope | 23,107 | 50.54 |
| Labour | Thomas MacNair | 17,912 | 39.18 |
| Liberal | Charlotte McNee | 4,703 | 10.29 |
| Majority | | 5,195 | 11.36 |
| Turnout | | 45,722 | 82.01 |
| Registered electors | | | |
| Unionist win (new seat) | | | |

General election 1951: Edinburgh Pentlands
| Party | Candidate | Votes | % | ±% |
|---|---|---|---|---|
| Unionist | John Hope | 27,804 | 57.67 | |
| Labour | David Connell | 20,405 | 42.33 | |
| Majority | | 7,399 | 15.34 | |
| Turnout | | 48,209 | 83.34 | |
| Registered electors | | | | |
| Unionist hold | | Swing | | |

General election 1955: Edinburgh Pentlands
| Party | Candidate | Votes | % | ±% |
|---|---|---|---|---|
| Unionist | John Hope | 23,496 | 59.47 | +1.80 |
| Labour | David Connell | 16,011 | 40.53 | −1.80 |
| Majority | | 7,485 | 18.94 | +3.60 |
| Turnout | | 39,507 | 77.28 | −7.06 |
| Registered electors | | | | |
| Unionist win (new boundaries) | | | | |

General election 1959: Edinburgh Pentlands
| Party | Candidate | Votes | % | ±% |
|---|---|---|---|---|
| Unionist | John Hope | 25,742 | 60.30 | +0.83 |
| Labour | John Mackintosh | 16,950 | 39.70 | −0.83 |
| Majority | | 8,792 | 20.60 | +1.36 |
| Turnout | | 42,692 | 80.28 | +3.00 |
| Registered electors | | | | |
| Unionist hold | | Swing | | |

=== Elections in the 1960s ===
General election 1964: Edinburgh Pentlands
| Party | Candidate | Votes | % | ±% |
|---|---|---|---|---|
| Unionist | Norman Wylie | 20,181 | 46.04 | |
| Labour | Magnus John Williamson | 17,794 | 40.59 | |
| Liberal | Charles L Abernethy | 5,862 | 13.37 | New |
| Majority | | 2,387 | 5.45 | |
| Turnout | | 43,837 | 81.57 | |
| Registered electors | | | | |
| Unionist hold | | Swing | | |

General election 1966: Edinburgh Pentlands
| Party | Candidate | Votes | % | ±% |
|---|---|---|---|---|
| Conservative | Norman Wylie | 19,176 | 44.94 | |
| Labour | William Wallace | 19,132 | 44.84 | |
| Liberal | Donald Clarke | 4,363 | 10.22 | |
| Majority | | 44 | 0.10 | |
| Turnout | | 42,671 | 80.48 | |
| Registered electors | | | | |
| Conservative hold | | Swing | | |

=== Elections in the 1970s ===
General election 1970: Edinburgh Pentlands
| Party | Candidate | Votes | % | ±% |
|---|---|---|---|---|
| Conservative | Norman Wylie | 21,829 | 46.11 | |
| Labour | Ewan Stewart | 18,646 | 39.38 | |
| Liberal | Donald Clarke | 4,055 | 8.56 | |
| SNP | A.W. Stephen Rae | 2,814 | 5.94 | New |
| Majority | | 3,183 | 6.72 | |
| Turnout | | 47,344 | 76.90 | |
| Registered electors | | 61,563 | | |
| Conservative hold | | Swing | | |

1970 notional result
| Party | Vote | % |
|---|---|---|
| Conservative | 17,000 | 45.70 |
| Labour | 14,800 | 39.78 |
| Liberal | 3,200 | 8.60 |
| SNP | 2,200 | 5.91 |
| Turnout | 37,200 | 76.79 |
| Electorate | 48,445 | |

General election February 1974: Edinburgh Pentlands
| Party | Candidate | Votes | % | ±% |
|---|---|---|---|---|
| Conservative | Malcolm Rifkind | 18,162 | 41.20 | –4.50 |
| Labour | John McWilliam | 13,560 | 30.76 | –9.02 |
| Liberal | Stanley Ross-Smith | 6,870 | 15.58 | +6.98 |
| SNP | T Forrest | 5,491 | 12.46 | +6.54 |
| Majority | | 4,602 | 10.44 | +4.53 |
| Turnout | | 44,083 | 80.88 | +4.09 |
| Registered electors | | 54,504 | | +6,059 |
| Conservative hold | | Swing | +2.26 | |

General election October 1974: Edinburgh Pentlands
| Party | Candidate | Votes | % | ±% |
|---|---|---|---|---|
| Conservative | Malcolm Rifkind | 14,083 | 33.93 | –7.27 |
| Labour Co-op | George Foulkes | 12,826 | 30.90 | +0.14 |
| SNP | J Hutchinson | 10,189 | 24.55 | +8.96 |
| Liberal | Stanley Ross-Smith | 4,411 | 10.63 | –1.83 |
| Majority | | 1,257 | 3.03 | –7.41 |
| Turnout | | 41,509 | 75.53 | –5.35 |
| Registered electors | | 54,955 | | +451 |
| Conservative hold | | Swing | –3.71 | |

General election 1979: Edinburgh Pentlands
| Party | Candidate | Votes | % | ±% |
|---|---|---|---|---|
| Conservative | Malcolm Rifkind | 17,684 | 39.28 | +5.35 |
| Labour | AJ Johnstone | 16,486 | 36.62 | +5.72 |
| Liberal | Colin Luckhurst | 5,919 | 13.15 | +2.52 |
| SNP | Stephen Maxwell | 4,934 | 10.96 | –13.59 |
| Majority | | 1,198 | 2.66 | –0.37 |
| Turnout | | 45,023 | 76.76 | +1.23 |
| Registered electors | | 58,652 | | +3,697 |
| Conservative hold | | Swing | –0.18 | |

=== Elections in the 1980s ===
1979 notional result
| Party | Vote | % |
|---|---|---|
| Conservative | 20,064 | 44.3 |
| Labour | 13,635 | 30.1 |
| Liberal | 6,138 | 13.6 |
| SNP | 5,393 | 11.9 |
| Others | 54 | 0.1 |
| Turnout | 45,284 | |
| Electorate | | |

General election 1983: Edinburgh Pentlands
| Party | Candidate | Votes | % | ±% |
|---|---|---|---|---|
| Conservative | Malcolm Rifkind | 17,051 | 39.2 | –5.1 |
| SDP | Keith Smith | 12,742 | 29.3 | +15.7 |
| Labour | Eric Milligan | 10,390 | 23.9 | –6.2 |
| SNP | Neil MacCormick | 2,642 | 6.1 | –5.8 |
| Ecology | Alistair Nicol-Smith | 687 | 1.6 | New |
| Majority | | 4,309 | 9.9 | +7.2 |
| Turnout | | 43,512 | 73.4 | –5.4 |
| Registered electors | | 59,295 | | |
| Conservative hold | | Swing | –10.4 | |

General election 1987: Edinburgh Pentlands
| Party | Candidate | Votes | % | ±% |
|---|---|---|---|---|
| Conservative | Malcolm Rifkind | 17,278 | 38.3 | –0.9 |
| Labour | Mark Lazarowicz | 13,533 | 30.0 | +6.1 |
| SDP | Keith Smith | 11,072 | 24.5 | –4.8 |
| SNP | Neil MacCormick | 3,264 | 7.2 | +1.2 |
| Majority | | 3,745 | 8.3 | –1.6 |
| Turnout | | 45,147 | 77.7 | +4.3 |
| Registered electors | | 58,125 | | –1,170 |
| Conservative hold | | Swing | –3.5 | |

=== Elections in the 1990s ===
General election 1992: Edinburgh Pentlands
| Party | Candidate | Votes | % | ±% |
|---|---|---|---|---|
| Conservative | Malcolm Rifkind | 18,128 | 40.7 | +2.4 |
| Labour Co-op | Mark Lazarowicz | 13,838 | 31.1 | +1.1 |
| SNP | Kathleen Caskie | 6,882 | 15.4 | +8.2 |
| Liberal Democrats | Keith Smith | 5,597 | 12.6 | −12.0 |
| Natural Law | David Rae | 111 | 0.2 | New |
| Majority | | 4,290 | 9.6 | +1.3 |
| Turnout | | 44,556 | 80.2 | +2.5 |
| Registered electors | | 55,567 | | –2,558 |
| Conservative hold | | Swing | +0.7 | |

1992 notional result
| Party | Vote | % |
|---|---|---|
| Conservative | 18,474 | 40.2 |
| Labour | 14,326 | 31.2 |
| SNP | 7,203 | 15.7 |
| Liberal Democrats | 5,828 | 12.7 |
| Others | 127 | 0.3 |
| Turnout | 45,958 | 77.3 |
| Electorate | 59,432 | |

General election 1997: Edinburgh Pentlands
| Party | Candidate | Votes | % | ±% |
|---|---|---|---|---|
| Labour | Lynda Clark | 19,675 | 43.0 | +11.8 |
| Conservative | Malcolm Rifkind | 14,813 | 32.4 | −7.8 |
| SNP | Stewart Gibb | 5,952 | 13.0 | −2.7 |
| Liberal Democrats | Jenny Dawe | 4,575 | 10.0 | –2.7 |
| Referendum | Malcolm McDonald | 422 | 0.9 | New |
| Green | Robin Harper | 224 | 0.5 | New |
| UKIP | Alistair McConnachie | 81 | 0.2 | New |
| Majority | | 4,862 | 10.6 | N/A |
| Turnout | | 45,742 | 75.8 | –3.5 |
| Registered electors | | 60,338 | | +906 |
| Labour gain from Conservative | | Swing | +9.8 | |

=== Election in the 2000s ===
General election 2001: Edinburgh Pentlands
| Party | Candidate | Votes | % | ±% |
|---|---|---|---|---|
| Labour | Lynda Clark | 15,797 | 40.6 | –2.4 |
| Conservative | Malcolm Rifkind | 14,055 | 36.1 | +3.7 |
| Liberal Democrats | David Walker | 4,210 | 10.8 | +0.8 |
| SNP | Stewart Gibb | 4,210 | 10.8 | –2.2 |
| Scottish Socialist | James Mearns | 555 | 1.4 | New |
| UKIP | Bill McMurdo | 105 | 0.3 | +0.1 |
| Majority | | 1,742 | 4.5 | –6.2 |
| Turnout | | 38,932 | 64.4 | –11.4 |
| Registered electors | | 60,484 | | +146 |
| Labour hold | | Swing | –3.1 | |

== See also ==
- Politics of Edinburgh
