= Lynda Clark, Baroness Clark of Calton =

Scottish judge

The Right Honourable The Baroness Clark of Calton PC
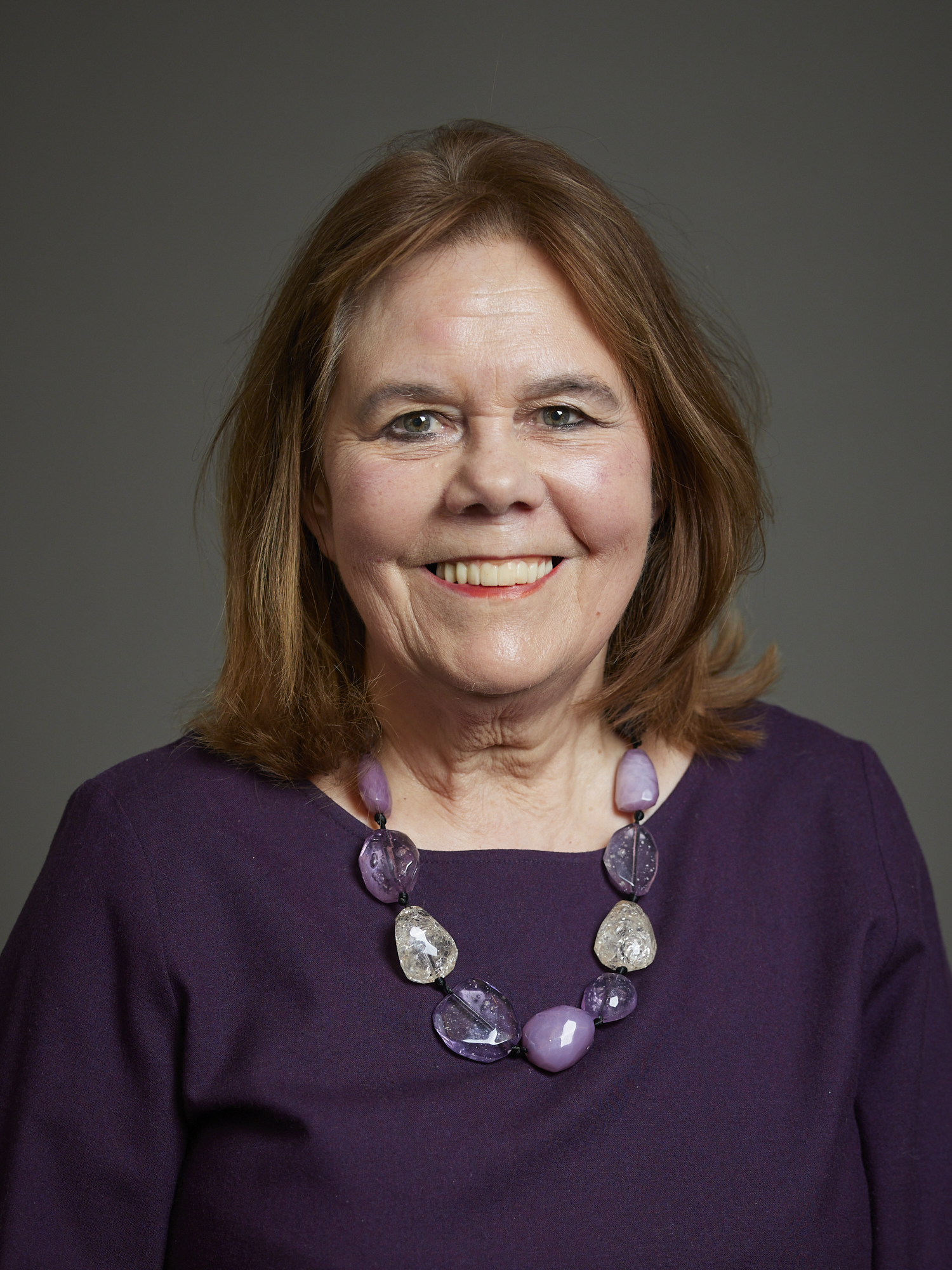
- Official portrait, 2023

Senator of the College of Justice
- In office 2006–2019
- Nominated by: Jack McConnell as First Minister
- Monarch: Elizabeth II
- Preceded by: Lady Cosgrove

Advocate General for Scotland
- In office 19 May 1999 – 18 January 2006
- Prime Minister: Tony Blair
- Preceded by: Office established
- Succeeded by: The Lord Davidson of Glen Clova

Member of the House of Lords
- Lord Temporal
- Life peerage 21 June 2005

Member of Parliament for Edinburgh Pentlands
- In office 1 May 1997 – 11 April 2005
- Preceded by: Malcolm Rifkind
- Succeeded by: Constituency abolished

Personal details
- Born: Lynda Margaret Clark; 26 February 1949 (age 77)
- Party: Labour
- Education: Queens College, St Andrews, University of Edinburgh

Lynda Margaret Clark, Baroness Clark of Calton PC, known as Lady Clark of Calton, (born 26 February 1949) is a Scottish judge. She was formerly the Labour Member of Parliament for Edinburgh Pentlands. She was Advocate General for Scotland from the creation of that position in 1999 until 2006, whereupon she became a Judge of the Court of Session in Scotland.

== Career ==
Clark read law at Queens College, St Andrews during its transition to independence as the University of Dundee School of Law, graduating in 1970 with an LL.B. (Hons) from St Andrews, and subsequently gained a PhD in criminology and penology from the University of Edinburgh in 1975 presenting the thesis "Bail decision-making : law and practice in Scotland". She was a lecturer in Jurisprudence from 1973 at the University of Dundee until she was called to the Scottish Bar in 1977. She took silk in 1989, and was subsequently called to the English Bar in 1990 as a member of the Inner Temple.

=== Politics ===
Clark first stood for election to Parliament at the 1992 general election, where she unsuccessfully contested the North East Fife seat held by Menzies Campbell of the Liberal Democrats. At the 1997 general election, she was elected to the House of Commons for the Edinburgh Pentlands constituency, unseating the Conservative Secretary of State for Foreign and Commonwealth Affairs, Malcolm Rifkind. Rifkind was one of the high-profile losses on election night for the Conservative Party, who experienced their worst defeat since the 1906 general election and lost all their seats in both Scotland and Wales.

In May 1999, Clark was appointed as the first-ever Advocate General for Scotland, a new post created by the Scotland Act 1998 to advise the Crown and Government of the United Kingdom on Scots law.

She stood down at the 2005 general election, allowing Secretary of State for Transport Alistair Darling to contest the new Edinburgh South West constituency.

On 13 May 2005, it was announced that Clark would be created a life peer, and on 21 June 2005 the title was gazetted as Baroness Clark of Calton, of Calton in the City of Edinburgh.

On 18 January 2006, Lady Clark of Calton resigned as Advocate General, pending an expected judicial appointment. She was replaced as Advocate General by Neil Davidson, QC (now Lord Davidson of Glen Clova).

=== Judge ===
On 19 January, Clark was appointed as a Senator of the College of Justice, a judge of the Supreme Courts of Scotland. She was installed in office in February 2006.

On 21 June 2012, Lady Clark succeeded Lord Drummond Young as chairman of the Scottish Law Commission. Lady Clark demitted office on 31 December 2013 in order to sit in the Inner House of the Court of Session, and was succeeded as chairman by Lord Pentland.

As of 2016, Lady Clark of Calton is the most recent Senator of the College of Justice to have served in the House of Commons.

She retired from the bench in 2019.

== Publications ==
- The Role of the Advocate General for Scotland
- Human Rights and Scots Law: Comparative Perspectives on the Incorporation of the ECHR. Hart Publishing. 2002. ISBN 978-1-84113-044-6.

Parliament of the United Kingdom
Preceded by Malcolm Rifkind	Member of Parliament for Edinburgh Pentlands; 1997 – 2005	Constituency abolished
Legal offices
Office Created	Advocate General for Scotland; 1999–2006	Succeeded by Neil Davidson
