= 2006 in the United Kingdom =

Events from the year 2006 in the United Kingdom.

== Incumbents ==
- Monarch – Elizabeth II
- Prime Minister – Tony Blair (Labour)

== Events ==
=== January ===
- 7 January – Charles Kennedy resigns as leader of the Liberal Democrats after admitting that he has a drinking problem.
- 20 January – River Thames whale: a whale is discovered swimming in the River Thames in London.
- 24 January – Sven-Göran Eriksson announces that he will retire as manager of the England national football team after this summer's World Cup in Germany. Eriksson, 57, has been in charge of the England team for five years and, as a Swede, is the first non-English manager of the England team.

=== February ===
- 3 February – Islamist demonstration outside Danish Embassy in London in response to the Jyllands-Posten Muhammad cartoons controversy.
- 9 February
  - Dunfermline and West Fife by-election: Willie Rennie of the Liberal Democrats wins the seat from Labour.
  - The Government announces that the Child Support Agency is to be abolished.
- 10–26 February – Great Britain competes at the Winter Olympics in Turin, Italy, and wins one silver medal (Shelley Rudman for women's skeleton).
- 16 February – The Brit Awards take place.
- 19 February – The BAFTA awards take place in London.
- 22 February
  - Securitas depot robbery: around £53 million (US$92 million) is stolen from a Securitas depot at Tonbridge, Kent, in the largest cash robbery in British crime history.
  - The Prince of Wales's court case continues in the High Court against The Mail on Sunday as he tries to prevent the publication of his journals. Various revelations have been made such as that he considers himself to be a dissident, and his opinion of government officials in the People's Republic of China whom he described as "appalling old waxworks".
- 27 February – Writers Michael Baigent and Richard Leigh sue Random House in the High Court of Justice, claiming that the best-selling novel The Da Vinci Code by Dan Brown contains ideas stolen from their 1982 book The Holy Blood and the Holy Grail.

=== March ===
- 1 March – The Senedd, debating chamber of the National Assembly for Wales on Cardiff Bay, designed by Richard Rogers, is opened by the Queen.
- 2 March
  - Sir Menzies Campbell is elected leader of the Liberal Democrats following an members' election caused by the resignation of previous leader, Charles Kennedy.
  - Four people are injured in an explosion in a GlaxoSmithKline factory in Irvine, North Ayrshire.
- 7 March – The President of Brazil, Luiz Inácio Lula da Silva, makes a state visit to the UK.
- 9 March – The notorious former politician John Profumo dies aged 91 of a stroke at Chelsea and Westminster Hospital.
- 13 March – Six men taking part in a clinical trial for a new anti-inflammatory drug TGN1412 are placed in intensive care, some in a life-threatening condition, after suffering adverse side effects.
- 19 March – The Prince of Wales and the Duchess of Cornwall begin a two-week foreign tour to Egypt, Saudi Arabia and India.
- 20 March – The British Press Awards are held at The Dorchester, Park Lane, London, but boycotted by some national newspapers.
- 21 March – Labour's hopes of a fourth successive term in office at the next general election (by which time Tony Blair says he will have resigned as prime minister) are given a boost when an Ipsos MORI opinion poll puts them eleven points ahead of the Conservatives on 42%.
- 23 March – 2005-2006 Christian Peacemaker hostage crisis: British peacemaker Norman Kember and three Canadians are rescued by SAS troops.
- 26 March – A smoking ban comes into effect in all enclosed public places in Scotland.
- 28 March
  - Council workers across the UK strike over pension rights.
  - Royal Regiment of Scotland created.
- 30 March – Identity Cards Act passed, providing for a national scheme of registration of individuals and issue of identity documents. It is never fully implemented and is repealed in 2011.

=== April ===
- 5 April – Discovery of a swan with avian influenza in Scotland.
- 7 April – Mr Justice Peter Smith delivers judgment in the copyright case over The Da Vinci Code finding that Dan Brown had not breached the copyright of Michael Baigent and Richard Leigh. The judgment itself contains a coded message on the whim of the judge.
- 12 April – Prince Harry passes out as a commissioned officer during the Sovereign's Parade at the Royal Military Academy Sandhurst.
- 18 April – Peugeot announces plans to close the 60-year-old car factory at Ryton near Coventry, which it bought from Chrysler in 1979, within the next year.
- 21 April – Elizabeth II celebrates her 80th birthday at Windsor. The Prince of Wales makes a televised address in tribute.
- 25 April – The BBC announces that Grandstand, its flagship sports TV programme, will end within the next year after nearly 50 years on air.
- 26 April – The Duke of Edinburgh visits the Republic of Ireland.
- 27 April – By-election in the Moray constituency of the Scottish Parliament. Richard Lochhead holds the seat for the Scottish National Party.
- 30 April – The last astronomy show is held at the London Planetarium before it is absorbed by neighbouring Madame Tussauds.

=== May ===
- 4 May
  - Local government elections take place in some areas of England.
  - Steve McClaren, manager of Middlesbrough Football Club, agrees to become the next manager of the England national football team after the World Cup.
- 5 May – Tony Blair reshuffles his cabinet. Charles Clarke is dismissed as Home Secretary. Jack Straw is replaced as the Foreign Secretary by Margaret Beckett. John Prescott remains as Deputy Prime Minister, but loses responsibility for the Office of the Deputy Prime Minister.
- 18 May – Kiyan Prince, a 15-year-old boy and talented footballer, is stabbed to death in Edgware, London, while trying to break up a fight. His murderer, Hannad Hasan, will be sentenced at the Old Bailey in 2007.
- 20 May – Campaigners "Fathers 4 Justice" invade the set of the National Lottery.
- 30 May – An Ipsos MORI opinion poll shows the Conservatives back in the lead with 36% of the vote, two points ahead of Labour.

=== June ===
- 9–11 June – The British Grand Prix is held at the Silverstone Circuit and is won by reigning world champion Fernando Alonso, ahead of Michael Schumacher and Kimi Räikkönen, while local hero Jenson Button retires earlier in the race with an engine oil leak.
- 10 June – The England football team's World Cup campaign begins with a 1–0 win over Paraguay.
- 15 June – England beat Trinidad and Tobago 2–0 in their second World Cup group game.
- 20 June – England go through to the knockout stages of the World Cup with a 2–2 draw against Sweden in their final group game.
- 25 June
  - Children's Party at the Palace held in honour of The Queen's 80th birthday.
  - The Lord Chancellor, Lord Falconer, rejects calls from families of murder victims for all convicted murderers to be sentenced to a minimum of 25 years in prison.
  - England advance to the World Cup quarter-finals for the second tournament in succession by beating Ecuador 1–0 with a goal from captain David Beckham.
- 29 June
  - Blaenau Gwent by-elections: independent candidates Dai Davies and Trish Law defeat Labour Party in parliamentary and Welsh Assembly by-elections. The elections were called following the death of incumbent Peter Law.
  - Bromley and Chislehurst by-election: Bob Neill holds the seat for the Conservative Party.
- 30 June – Three men are convicted of plotting the execution-style murders of a middle-aged couple, John and Joan Stirland, at their home in Trusthorpe, Lincolnshire, in 2004. The killings were in revenge for a murder committed by Joan Stirland's son in Nottingham in 2003. Five other men were cleared of conspiracy to murder following the trial at Birmingham Crown Court.

=== July ===
- July – The European heat wave affects the UK, resulting in July 1983's record for the hottest month in the CET series being beaten with a mean monthly CET of 19.8 °C or 67.6 °F.
- 1 July – England's World Cup campaign ends in the quarter-finals when they lose on penalties to Portugal after a goalless draw.
- 4 July – Sheridan v News Group Newspapers Ltd: Scottish Socialist Party MSP Tommy Sheridan begins an action for defamation against the News of the World at the Court of Session in Edinburgh. Sheridan's case is upheld but he is later prosecuted for perjury.
- 7 July – The United Kingdom commemorates the first anniversary of the 7/7 London terrorist bombings.
- 17 July – George W. Bush greets Tony Blair with the phrase "Yo, Blair".
- 18 July – 180 British citizens evacuated from the Lebanon due to growing crisis between Hizbollah militants and Israel.
- 20 July – HMS Bulwark prepares to evacuate British nationals from the Lebanon.
- 22 July – Arsenal Football Club move into the Emirates Stadium, named after the airline company as part of a 15-year sponsorship deal, after 93 years at nearby Highbury. The 60,000-seat stadium is the largest club stadium to have been built in English football since Maine Road, which was home of Manchester City from 1923 to 2003.

=== August ===
- 1 August – Steve McClaren is officially appointed as manager of the England national football team.
- 9–10 August – Police make many arrests in relation to a transatlantic aircraft plot, and tight security measures are instigated at airports.
- August – The first modern solely Gaelic-medium school to offer secondary education, Sgoil Ghàidhlig Ghlaschu, is opened at Woodside in Glasgow.

=== September ===
- 2 September – Royal Air Force Nimrod crash in Afghanistan: fourteen personnel are killed in Britain's worst single military loss since the Falklands War.
- 9 September – Helen Mirren is awarded best actress at the Venice Film Festival for her role in The Queen, portraying Elizabeth II following the death of Diana, Princess of Wales.
- 11 September – First person convicted of murder after a prior acquittal for the same crime, following the 2003 change to the law on double jeopardy after a campaign by Ann Ming (Billy Dunlop, who pleads guilty to the 1989 murder of Julie Hogg in Billingham).
- 20 September – Television presenter Richard Hammond suffers a serious brain injury when he crashes a jet-powered car whilst filming for Top Gear.
- 25 September – Copmanthorpe rail crash: One man dies when the 14:25 from Plymouth to Edinburgh operated by Virgin CrossCountry hits a car at about 20:55.

=== October ===
- 1 October – Regulatory Reform (Fire Safety) Order 2005 comes into effect, requiring a Fire Risk Assessment for all non-domestic premises in England and Wales.
- 5 October – Rt. Hon. Elish Angiolini, QC, appointed as Lord Advocate in Scotland. She is the first woman and the first solicitor to be appointed to the post.
- 9 October – Opening of the Beetham Tower, Manchester, a landmark 168-metre 47-storey skyscraper with oversailing upper floors designed by Ian Simpson of SimpsonHaugh and Partners, the tallest building in the UK outside London, and with its penthouse apartments (above the Hilton Hotel) being the highest residential addresses in the country.
- 13 October: European Home Retail plc and its subsidiary Farepak go into administration, leaving tens of thousands of people out of pocket for Christmas 2006.
- 26 October – The Duke of Edinburgh officially opens Arsenal's new stadium.
- 30 October – The Stern Review on the Economics of Climate Change is published by the UK government.

=== November ===
- 2 November – Volunteers from the Royal British Legion's Lloyd's of London Branch organise the first London Poppy Day to raise funds for the Poppy Appeal.
- 5 November – 53-year-old Ronald Castree is arrested in connection with the murder of 11-year-old Lesley Molseed in 1975. Stefan Kiszko had spent 16 years in jail for the crime before his conviction was quashed in 1992. Castree would be convicted of the crime in November 2007.
- 7 November – Dhiren Barot is sentenced to life imprisonment for plotting large scale terrorist attacks in Britain and abroad. The Court of Appeal noted that Barot's "businesslike" plans would have caused carnage on a "colossal and unprecedented scale" if they had been successful.
- 8 November – Three men of Pakistani origin sentenced to life imprisonment for the racist murder of Kriss Donald in Glasgow.
- 10 November – after five hours of deliberations, the jury at Leeds Crown Court cleared Nick Griffin and Mark Collett from British National Party (BNP), of all hate charges.
- 13 November – The legendary racehorse Desert Orchid dies aged 27 at Newmarket.
- 16 November – The 21st James Bond film – Casino Royale – is released in British cinemas. Daniel Craig makes his debut as Bond in the film.
- 19 November – Home Secretary John Reid attacks the Chancellor of the Exchequer Gordon Brown for being "presumptuous" and "disloyal" for openly campaigning to replace Tony Blair as Prime Minister.
- 23 November – Alexander Litvinenko dies in London having been poisoned by Polonium-210.
- 24 November – Loyalist Michael Stone attempts to bomb the Northern Ireland Assembly on the day nominations for first and deputy first minister are to be made. Ian Paisley indicates his willingness to serve as First Minister.

=== December ===
- 2 December – A young woman's body is found in a brook near Ipswich; her death is initially treated as "unexplained".
- 4 December – The woman whose corpse was found in Ipswich two days ago is identified as Gemma Adams, a 25-year-old local prostitute. Her death is reported to be suspicious and police launch a murder inquiry. There are also concerns about another Ipswich prostitute, 19-year-old Tania Nicol, who went missing on 30 October.
- 7 December – The London Tornado of 2006 hits.
- 8 December – The body of missing Ipswich prostitute Tania Nicol is found on the outskirts of the town.
- 9 December – Police in Ipswich launch a murder investigation into the death of Tania Nicol and admit that it is likely she met her death at the hands of the same person or people who killed Gemma Adams.
- 10 December – A third prostitute's body is found in the Ipswich area.
- 14 December – Two more women are found dead in Ipswich and it is confirmed that both are prostitutes, meaning that the police are now investigating five murders.
- 12 December – The Ryton car factory closes and Peugeot 206 production is transferred to Slovakia, several months ahead of the scheduled closure date. 2,300 jobs are lost.
- 18 December – A man is arrested near Felixstowe on suspicion of murdering the five Ipswich prostitutes. He is named as Tom Stephens, a 37-year-old Tesco supermarket worker.
- 19 December – A second man, 48-year-old forklift truck driver Steve Wright, is arrested in connection with the Ipswich serial murders, while police are given more time to question the first suspect.
- 21 December – Steve Wright is charged with the Ipswich prostitute murders, while Tom Stephens is released on bail pending further inquiries.
- 29 December – The British government pays off the Anglo-American loan made in 1946.
- 31 December – Public Hogmanay celebrations in Glasgow and Edinburgh are cancelled due to poor weather conditions.

== Publications ==
- Richard Dawkins' atheist argument The God Delusion.
- Victoria and Elizabeth Kann's children's picture book Pinkalicious (23 May).
- James Lovelock's climate crisis hypothesis The Revenge of Gaia.
- Terry Pratchett's Discworld novel Wintersmith.
- Will Self's novel The Book of Dave.

== Births ==
- 20 January – Ethan Wheatley, footballer
- 1 March – Peter Connelly, child abuse victim (died 2007)
- 1 May – Lewis Miley, footballer
- 22 June – Anna Hursey, Welsh table tennis player
- July - Cllr. George Finch, leader of Warwickshire county council.

== Deaths ==
=== January ===
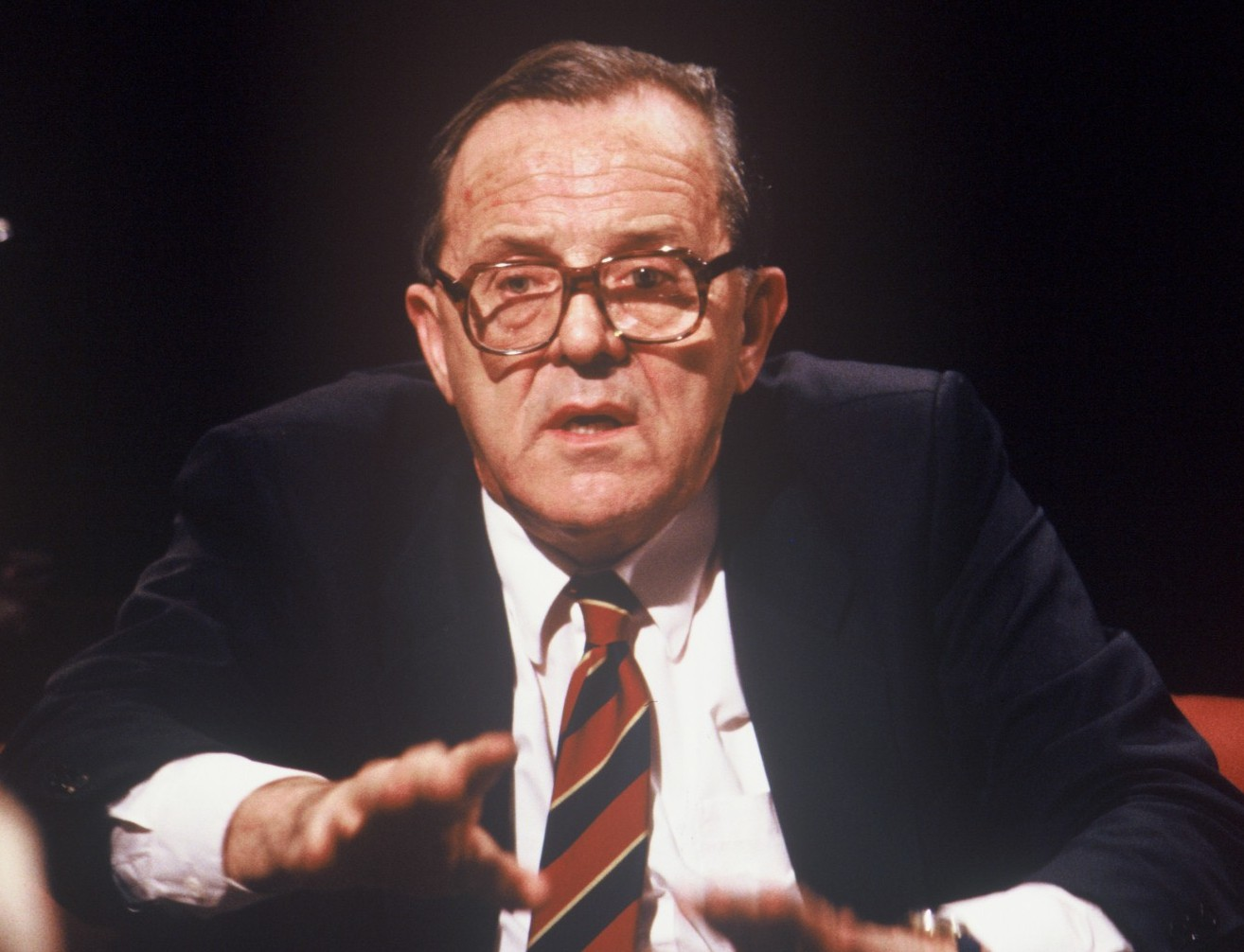
Merlyn Rees

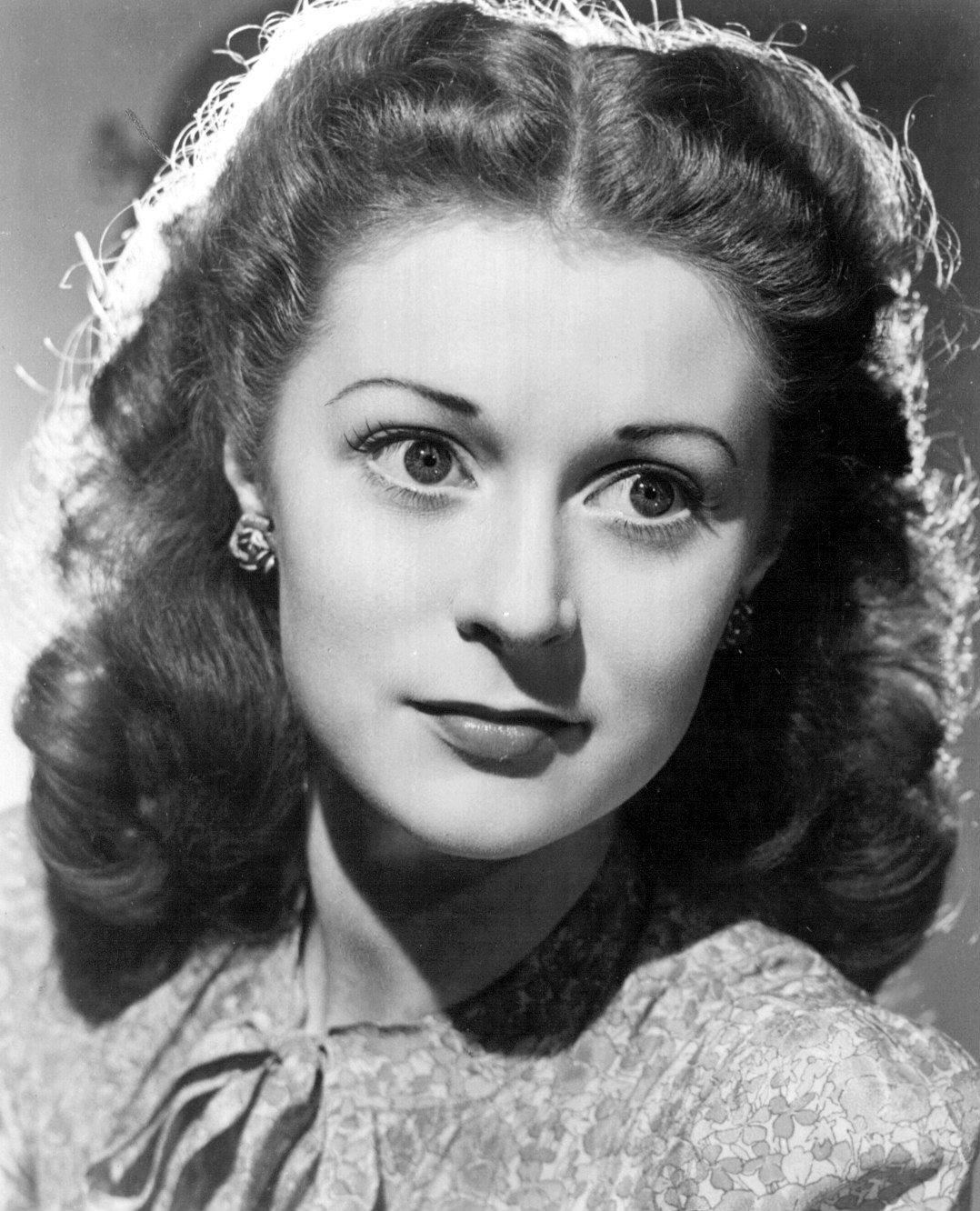
Moira Shearer

- 2 January – John Woodnutt, actor (born 1924)
- 5 January
  - Merlyn Rees, politician, Secretary of State for Northern Ireland (1974–1976) and Home Secretary (1976–1979) (born 1920)
  - Rachel Squire, Scottish politician (born 1954)
- 8 January
  - Tony Banks, Baron Stratford, politician, Minister for Sport (1997–1999) (born 1943)
  - Alex Elmsley, magician (born 1929)
- 10 January – Alethea Hayter, writer (born 1911)
- 14 January – Mark Philo, footballer (car accident) (born 1984)
- 16 January – Jan Mark, children's writer (born 1943)
- 17 January
  - Wallace Mercer, businessman (born 1946)
  - Giles Worsley, architectural historian (born 1961)
- 21 January – John James Cowperthwaite, civil servant, Financial Secretary of Hong Kong (1961–1971) (born 1915)
- 23 January – Michael Wharton, humorist (Daily Telegraph; "Peter Simple") (born 1913)
- 24 January – Sir Nicholas Shackleton, geologist (born 1937)
- 25 January – Robin Coombs, immunologist, creator of the Coombs test (born 1921)
- 26 January – John Dunwoody, politician (born 1929)
- 27 January
  - Christopher Lloyd, gardening writer (born 1921)
  - Phyllis King, tennis player, oldest living Wimbledon champion (born 1905)
  - Victor Mishcon, Baron Mishcon, lawyer and politician (born 1915)
- 28 January – Henry McGee, actor (born 1929)
- 30 January – Irving Rosenwater, statistician and author (born 1932)
- 31 January – Moira Shearer, ballerina, actress and wife of Ludovic Kennedy (born 1926)

=== February ===
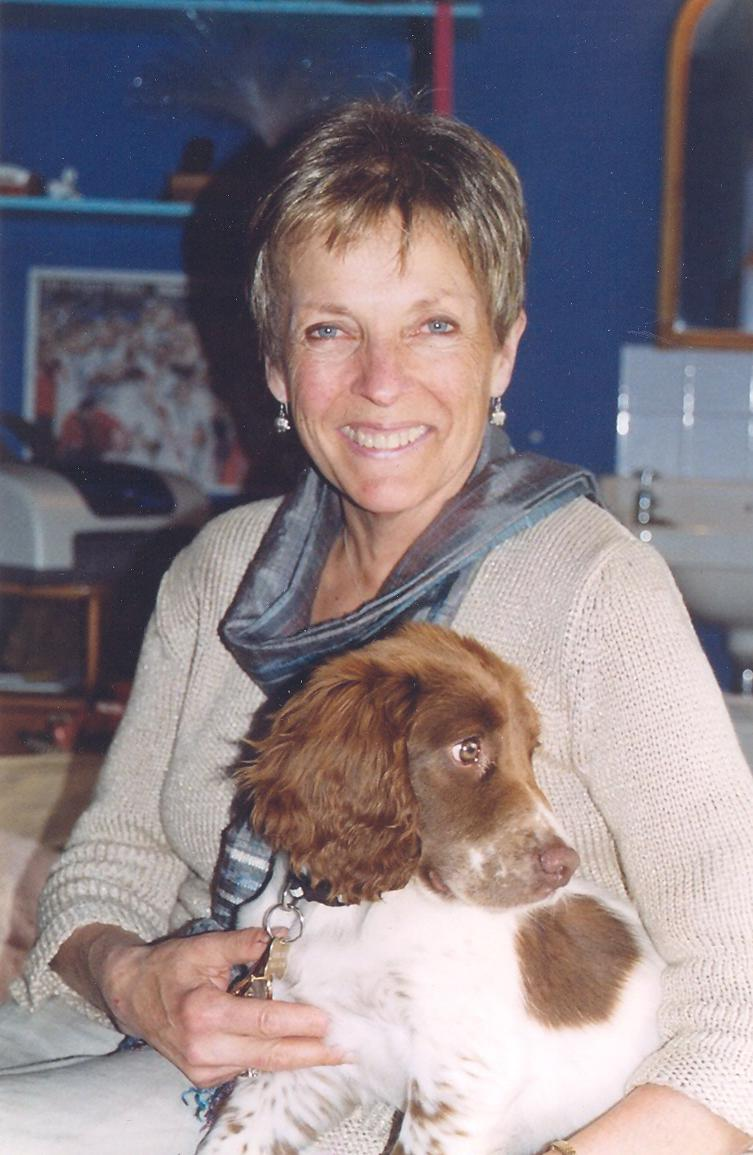
Jill Fraser

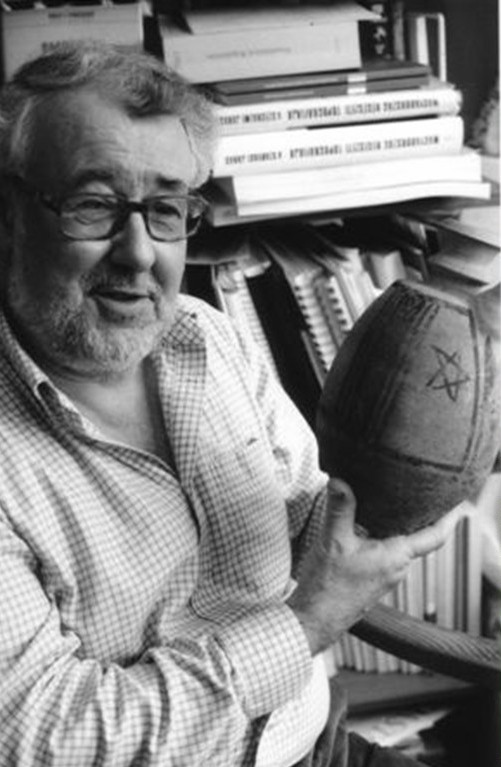
Andrew Sherratt

- 1 February – Ernest Dudley, actor, dramatist, novelist, journalist and screenwriter (born 1908)
- 3 February
  - Ernie Clements, racing cyclist (born 1922)
  - Frank Ellis, radiologist (born 1905)
- 4 February – Jack Taylor, one of Britain's heaviest men (born 1946)
- 5 February
  - Elton Dean, jazz musician (born 1945)
  - Stuart Mason, English footballer (born 1948)
  - Peter Philp, dramatist and antiques expert (born 1920)
- 6 February – Stella Ross-Craig, flora illustrator (born 1906)
- 8 February
  - Michael Gilbert, lawyer and crime fiction writer (born 1912)
  - Ron Greenwood, footballer and manager (born 1921)
- 9 February – Sir Freddie Laker, airline entrepreneur (born 1922)
- 10 February – Jill Fraser, theatre director (born 1946)
- 11 February – Peggy Cripps Appiah, children's author and socialite (born 1921)
- 13 February
  - John Brooke-Little, herald (born 1927)
  - P. F. Strawson, philosopher (born 1919)
- 14 February – Lynden David Hall, soul singer (born 1974)
- 16 February – Dennis Kirkland, television producer (born 1942)
- 20 February – Lou Gish, actress (born 1967)
- 22 February – Richard Wawro, artist (born 1952)
- 24 February
  - Andrew Sherratt, archaeologist (born 1946)
  - Denis C. Twitchett, Cambridge scholar, Chinese historian (born 1925)
- 26 February
  - Georgina Battiscombe, biographer (born 1906)
  - Hans Singer, economist, devised Prebisch–Singer hypothesis (born 1910, German Empire)
- 27 February – Linda Smith, comedian (born 1958)
- 28 February – Hugh McCartney, Scottish politician (born 1920)

=== March ===
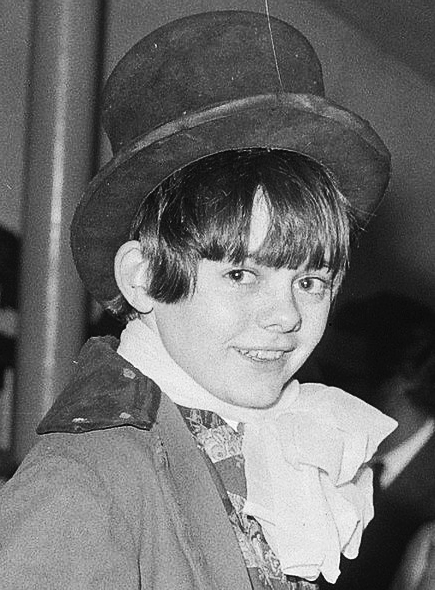
Jack Wild

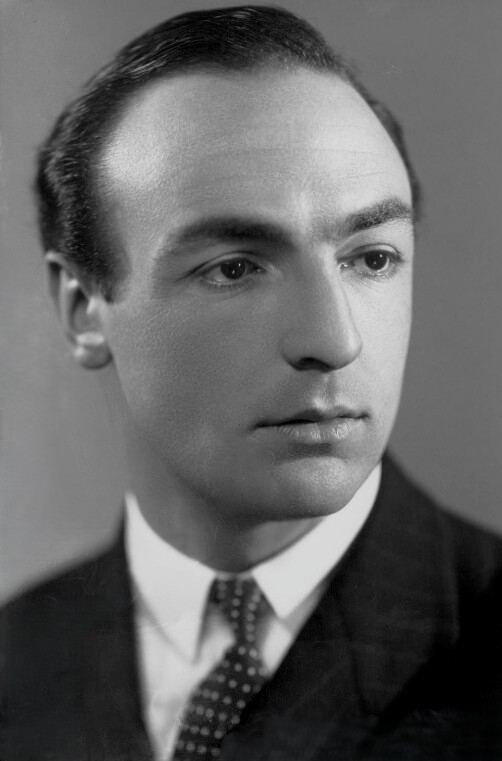
John Profumo

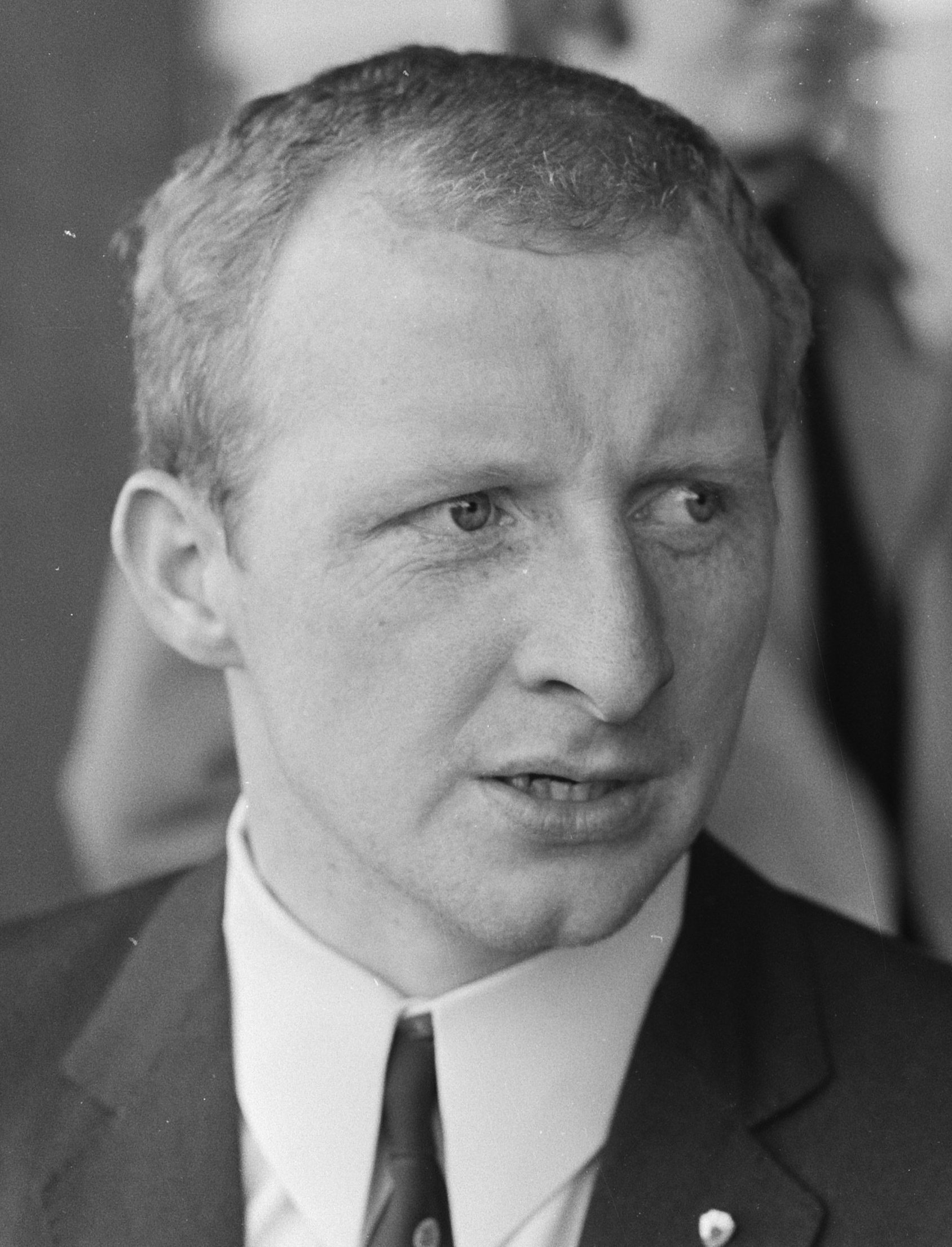
Jimmy Johnstone

- 1 March
  - Peter Osgood, footballer (born 1947)
  - Jack Wild, actor (born 1952)
- 2 March – Alice Baker, Leading Aircraftswoman in the Royal Flying Corps and last surviving British female veteran of World War I (born 1898)
- 3 March – Ivor Cutler, Scottish poet, songwriter and humorist (born 1923)
- 7 March – John Junkin, actor (born 1930)
- 8 March – George Sassoon, scientist and author (born 1936)
- 9 March – John Profumo, politician (born 1915)
- 11 March
  - Sir Anthony Farrar-Hockley, Army general and military historian (born 1924)
  - Pauline Gregg, historian (born 1909)
  - Lindsay Shonteff, film director (born 1935, Canada)
- 13 March – Jimmy Johnstone, Scottish footballer (Celtic) (born 1944)
- 14 March – Hamish Gray, Baron Gray of Contin, politician (born 1927)
- 16 March
  - James "Speedy" Hill, Army brigadier (born 1911)
  - Moira Redmond, actress (born 1928)
- 18 March – Michael Attwell, actor (born 1943)
- 20 March – Chris Tame, political activist (born 1946)
- 21 March
  - Desmond Ackner, Baron Ackner, judge (born 1920)
  - Margaret Ewing, Scottish politician (born 1945)
  - Richard Usborne, journalist and author (born 1910)
- 23 March – Peter Shand Kydd, wallpaper heir and stepfather of Diana, Princess of Wales (born 1925)
- 24 March
  - Lynne Perrie, actress (born 1931)
  - Norman Pounds, geographer and historian (born 1912)
- 26 March – Nikki Sudden, singer-songwriter and guitarist (Swell Maps) (born 1956)
- 27 March
  - Ian Hamilton Finlay, artist (born 1925)
  - Ruari McLean, Scottish-born typographic designer (born 1917)

=== April ===
- 3 April
  - Martin Gilks, drummer (The Wonder Stuff) (road accident) (born 1965)
  - Andrew Stark, diplomat (born 1916)
- 4 April
  - Mary Boyce, authority on Iran (born 1920)
  - John George Macleod, Scottish doctor (born 1915)
  - Vickery Turner, actress (born 1940)
- 6 April – Leslie Norris, Anglo-Welsh poet and author (born 1921)
- 9 April – Robin Orr, organist and composer (born 1909)
- 11 April – Angus Wells, writer (born 1943)
- 12 April – Richard Bebb, actor (born 1927)
- 13 April – Muriel Spark, Scottish novelist (born 1918)
- 15 April – Calum Kennedy, Scottish singer (born 1928)
- 17 April – Peter Cadbury, entrepreneur (born 1918)
- 18 April – John Lyall, footballer and manager (born 1940)
- 19 April
  - June Knox-Mawer, writer (born 1930)
  - Ian Morrow, accountant and businessman (born 1912)
- 21 April – Sir Richard Bayliss, physician (born 1917)
- 22 April – Enriqueta Harris, art historian (born 1910)
- 23 April
  - Jennifer Jayne, actress (born 1931)
  - Ian Nelson, musician (born 1956)
- 24 April
  - Peter Ellis, television director (born 1948)
  - Brian Labone, footballer (born 1940)
- 25 April – Peter Law, Welsh politician (born 1948)
- 30 April – Barry Driscoll, painter and sculptor (born 1926)

=== May ===
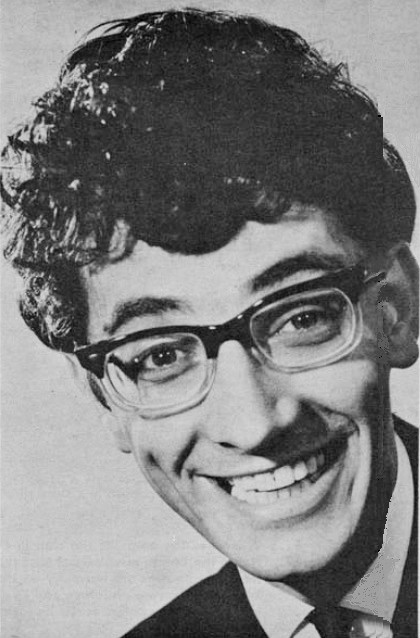
Freddie Garrity

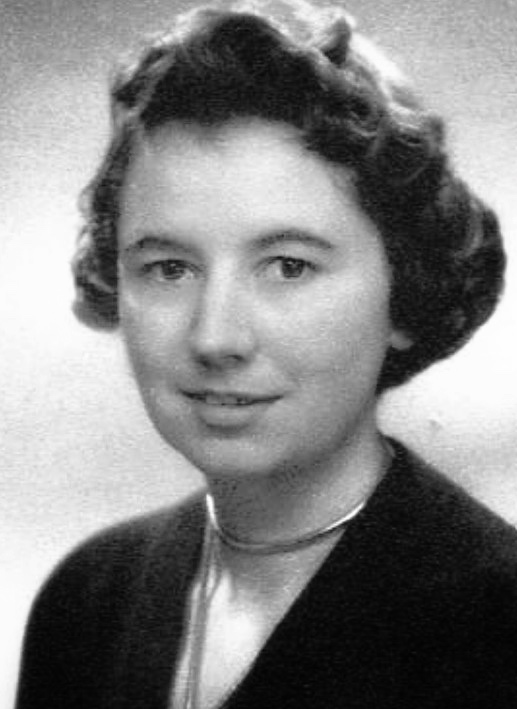
Milicent Bagot

- 1 May – Wilfrid Butt, biochemist (born 1922)
- 6 May
  - Sir Anthony Morton, Royal Navy admiral (born 1923)
  - Sarah-Jayne Mulvihill, RAF flight lieutenant (killed in action, Iraq) (born 1973)
- 7 May – Duncan Inglis Cameron, Scottish university administrator (born 1927)
- 8 May – Iain MacMillan, photographer (born 1938)
- 10 May
  - Val Guest, film director (born 1911)
  - Marie Hartley, writer (born 1906)
- 15 May – David Sharp, mountaineer (born 1972); died on Mount Everest
- 17 May
  - Eric Forth, Scottish-English politician, Shadow Leader of the House of Commons (2001–2003) (born 1944)
  - John Miller, Army lieutenant-colonel, Crown Equerry to the Queen (1961–1987) (born 1919)
- 18 May – Kiyan Prince, footballer (murdered) (born 1990)
- 19 May
  - Peter Bryant, television producer and actor (born 1923)
  - Freddie Garrity, singer (Freddie and the Dreamers) (born 1940)
- 20 May – Tommy Watt, jazz bandleader (born 1925)
- 22 May – Jack Fallon, jazz bassist (born 1915, Canada)
- 23 May – James Lowther, 7th Earl of Lonsdale, peer (born 1922)
- 25 May – Sir Julian Bullard, diplomat (born 1928)
- 26 May – Milicent Bagot, intelligence officer (born 1907)
- 29 May – Paul Douglas, journalist and cameraman (killed in Iraq) (born 1957)

=== June ===
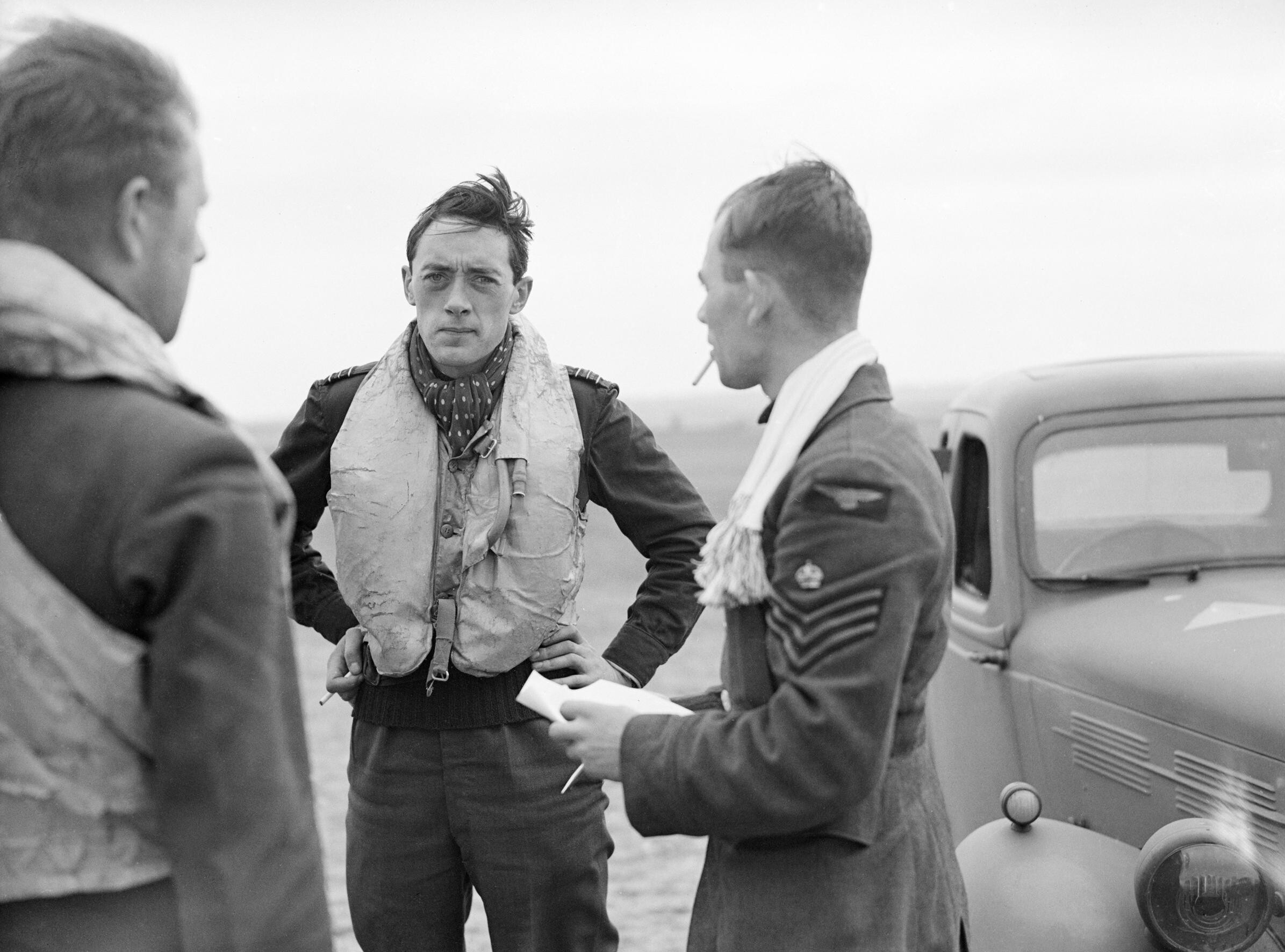
George Unwin (right)

- 1 June – Allan Prior, television scriptwriter (born 1922)
- 2 June
  - Ronald Cass, screenwriter and composer (born 1923)
  - Roy Farran, Army major (born 1921)
- 4 June
  - Alec Bregonzi, actor (born 1930)
  - Sir John Rowlands GC, RAF air marshal (born 1915)
- 6 June – Leslie Alcock, archaeologist, chief excavator of Cadbury Castle (born 1925)
- 8 June – Peter Smithers, politician (born 1913)
- 10 June – Peter Douglas Kennedy, collector of folk songs (born 1922)
- 11 June
  - Ernest Arthur Bell, biochemist, Director of the Royal Botanic Gardens, Kew (1981–1988) (born 1926)
  - Bruce Shand, Army major and father of Queen Camilla (born 1917)
- 12 June – Hugh Latimer, actor (born 1913)
- 14 June – Monty Berman, cinematographer (born 1913)
- 16 June
  - Roland Boyes, politician (born 1937)
  - Daphne Osborne, botanist (born 1930)
- 17 June – Julian Slade, composer (Salad Days) (born 1930)
- 18 June – Sir David Poole, judge (born 1938)
- 19 June – Hugh Baird, Scottish footballer (born 1930)
- 22 June
  - Gilbert Monckton, 2nd Viscount Monckton of Brenchley, Army major-general and politician (born 1915)
  - Peter Edward Lionel Russell, historian (born 1913)
  - Michael Scott Weir, diplomat (born 1925)
- 25 June
  - Elkan Allan, television producer (born 1922)
  - Kenneth Griffith, Welsh actor (born 1921)
- 28 June
  - June Lloyd, Baroness Lloyd of Highbury, paediatrician (born 1928)
  - George Unwin, RAF wing commander and Battle of Britain ace (born 1913)
- 29 June – Joyce Hatto, pianist (born 1928)

=== July ===
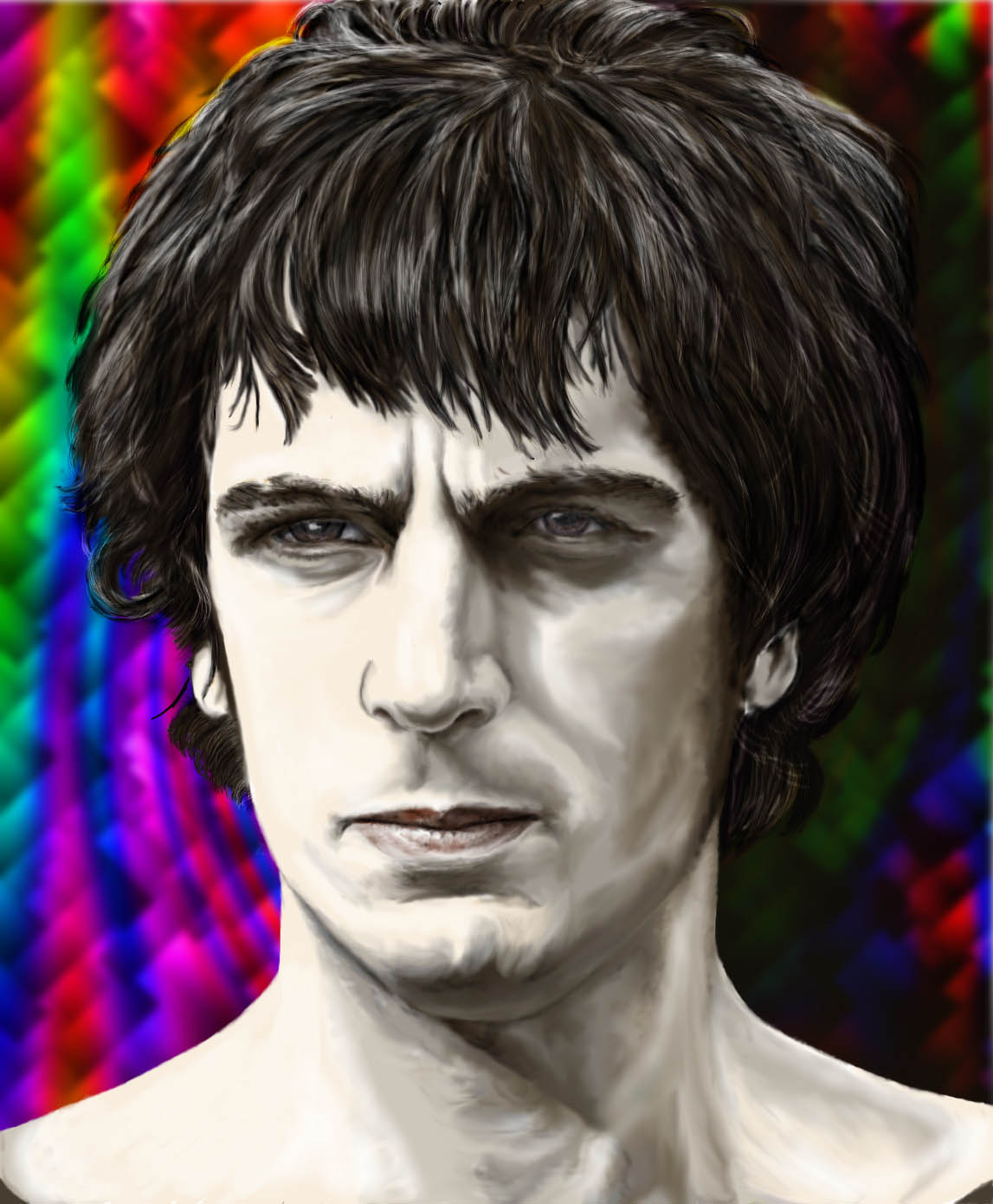
Syd Barrett

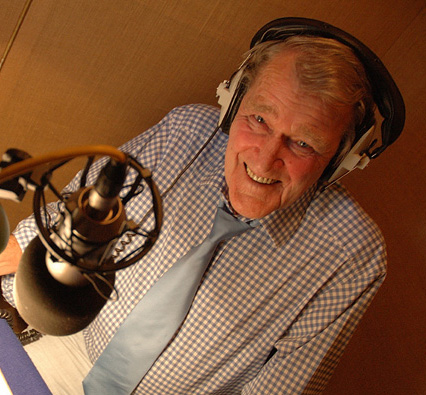
Patrick Allen

- 1 July – Fred Trueman, cricketer (born 1931)
- 2 July
  - Maurice Fox-Strangways, 9th Earl of Ilchester, peer, engineer and RAF group captain (born 1920)
  - Joan Quennell, politician (born 1923)
- 3 July
  - Francis Cammaerts, World War II secret agent (born 1916)
  - Gwyn Jones, physicist (born 1917)
  - Nimrod Ping, architect, politician and activist (born 1947)
- 5 July – Don Lusher, jazz trombonist (born 1923)
- 6 July
  - E. S. Turner, journalist and author (born 1909)
  - Tom Weir, climber, author and broadcaster (born 1914)
- 7 July – Syd Barrett, founding member of Pink Floyd (born 1946)
- 8 July – Peter Hawkins, actor and voice artist (born 1924)
- 9 July – Alan Senitt, activist (murdered in the United States) (born 1978)
- 10 July – Tommy Bruce, singer ("Ain't Misbehavin'") (born 1937)
- 11 July – John Spencer, snooker player (born 1935)
- 13 July – John Lyttelton, 11th Viscount Cobham, peer (born 1943)
- 14 July – Anthony Cave Brown, historian (born 1929)
- 15 July – Francis Rose, botanist (born 1921)
- 16 July – Kevin Hughes, politician (born 1952)
- 18 July
  - Jimmy Leadbetter, Scottish footballer (Ipswich Town) (born 1928)
  - David Maloney, television director and producer (born 1933)
- 20 July – Ted Grant, politician (born 1913)
- 23 July – Terence Otway, Army lieutenant-colonel and veteran of Operation Tonga (born 1914, Egypt)
- 25 July – Bob Simpson, journalist (born 1944)
- 26 July – Jessie Gilbert, chess player (fall) (born 1987)
- 28 July
  - Patrick Allen, actor (born 1927)
  - David Gemmell, author (born 1948)
- 30 July – Philip D'Arcy Hart, medical researcher, pioneer in tuberculosis treatment (born 1900)

=== August ===
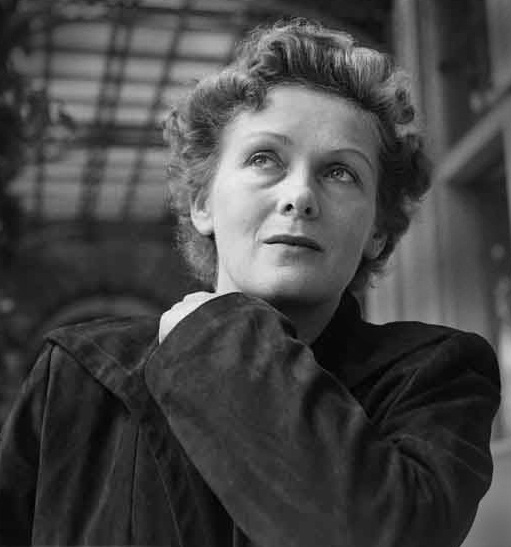
Elisabeth Schwarzkopf

- 1 August – George Styles GC, Army lieutenant-colonel (born 1928)
- 2 August – Kim McLagan, fashion model (car accident) (born 1948)
- 3 August
  - Kenneth Richmond, Olympic wrestler (born 1926)
  - Elisabeth Schwarzkopf, German-born operatic soprano (born 1915)
- 6 August
  - Stella Moray, actress (born 1923)
  - Ian Walters, sculptor (born 1930)
- 9 August – Philip Empson High, science fiction author (born 1914)
- 13 August
  - Jack Edwards, soldier and veterans' campaigner (born 1918)
  - Tony Jay, English-born actor (born 1933)
- 17 August – Christopher Polge, biologist (born 1926)
- 19 August – Joyce Blair, actress (born 1932)
- 20 August
  - Bryan Budd VC, soldier (killed in Afghanistan) (born 1977)
  - Richard de Yarburgh-Bateson, 6th Baron Deramore, peer, architect and author (born 1911)
- 23 August
  - Nigel Malim, rear-admiral (born 1919)
  - Raymond Harold Sawkins, novelist (born 1923)
- 24 August – David Plowright, television producer (born 1930)
- 26 August
  - Robin Fearn, diplomat (born 1934)
  - Alfred Sherman, writer, journalist, and political analyst (born 1919)
- 27 August – David Nicholson, jockey (born 1939)
- 28 August – Pip Pyle, drummer (born 1950)
- 30 August
  - Margaret Hubble, radio broadcaster (born 1914)
  - Emrys Jones, Welsh geographer (born 1920)
  - Hector Monro, Baron Monro of Langholm, politician (born 1922)
- 31 August – David Macpherson, 2nd Baron Strathcarron, peer (born 1924)

=== September ===
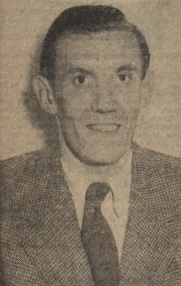
Peter Ling

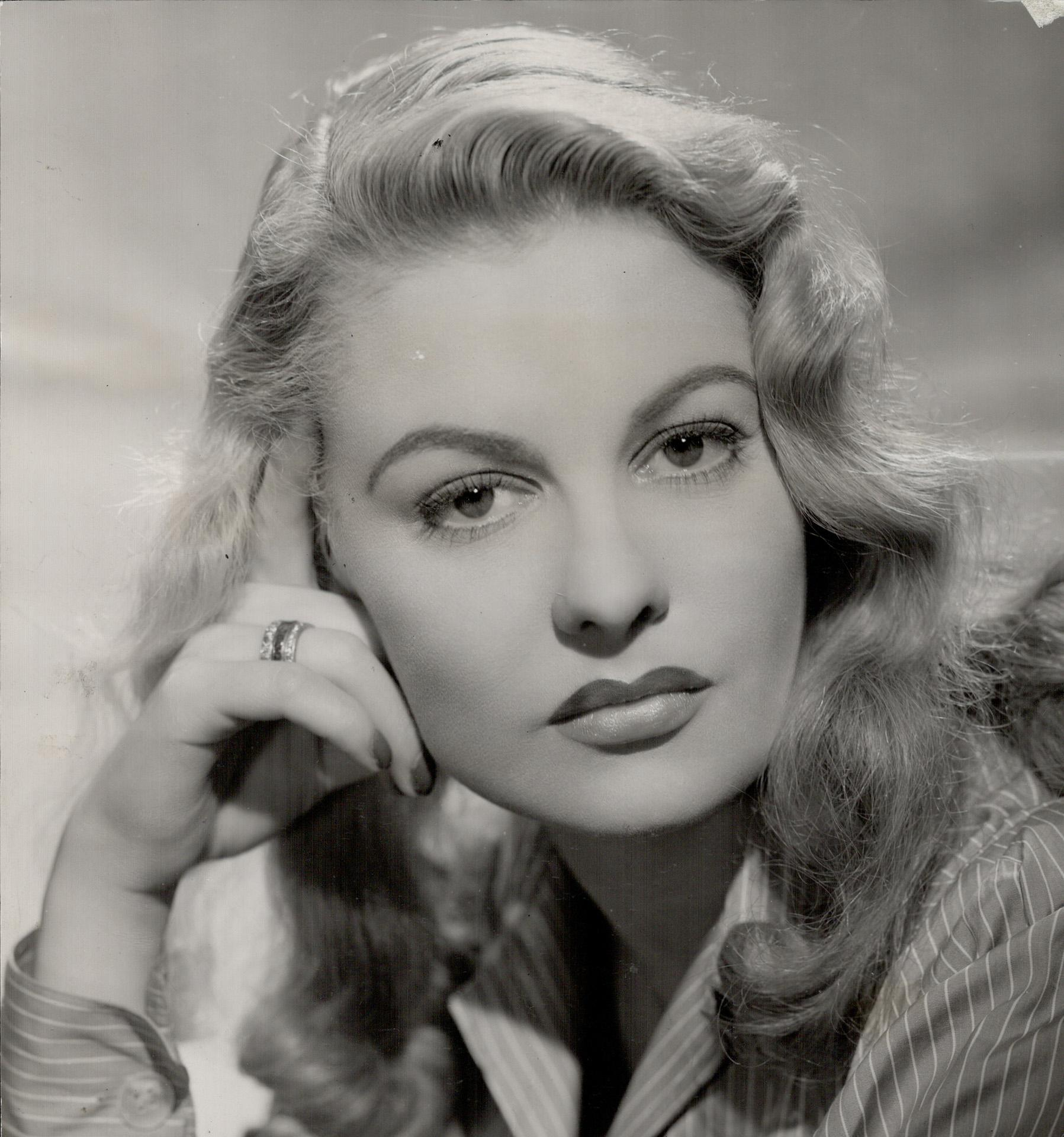
Sally Gray

- 1 September
  - Richard Frewen Martin, RAF test pilot (born 1918)
  - Kyffin Williams, landscape painter (born 1918)
- 2 September –
  - Lionel Pickering, businessman, football chairman (born 1932)
  - Charlie Williams, comedian, previously footballer (born 1928)
- 3 September
  - Levi Fox, conservationist and historian (born 1914)
  - Ian Hamer, jazz trumpeter (born 1932)
- 4 September – Clive Lythgoe, pianist (born 1927)
- 5 September
  - Sir Michael Davies, judge (born 1921)
  - Anne Gregg, travel writer and television presenter (born 1940)
  - Hilary Mason, actress (born 1917)
  - John McLusky, comics artist (born 1923)
- 6 September
  - John Drummond, controller of BBC Radio 3 (born 1934)
  - Mark Wright GC, soldier (killed in Afghanistan) (born 1979)
- 7 September – Norman Blacklock, physician (born 1928)
- 8 September – Hilda Bernstein, English-born author, artist and activist (born 1915)
- 10 September – John Johnston, courtier (born 1922)
- 11 September – William Auld, poet and esperantist (born 1924)
- 13 September – Sir Douglas Dodds-Parker, soldier and politician (born 1909)
- 14 September – Peter Ling, television writer and novelist (born 1926)
- 15 September
  - Raymond Baxter, television presenter (born 1922)
  - Douglas Henderson, Scottish politician (born 1935)
  - Meredith Thring, engineer (born 1915, Australia)
- 16 September – E. H. H. Green, historian (born 1928)
- 21 September
  - Alan Fletcher, graphic designer (born 1931)
  - Charles Rees, chemist (born 1927)
- 23 September
  - Malcolm Arnold, composer (born 1921)
  - Patrick Tull, actor (born 1941)
- 24 September – Sally Gray, actress (born 1916)
- 26 September
  - Philip Randle, biochemist (born 1926)
  - Martin Roth, psychiatrist (born 1917, Austria-Hungary)
- 27 September
  - Arthur Marwick, historian (born 1936)
  - Sir Michael Pollock, admiral (born 1916)
- 28 September – James Hamilton, 4th Baron Hamilton of Dalzell, politician (born 1938)

=== October ===
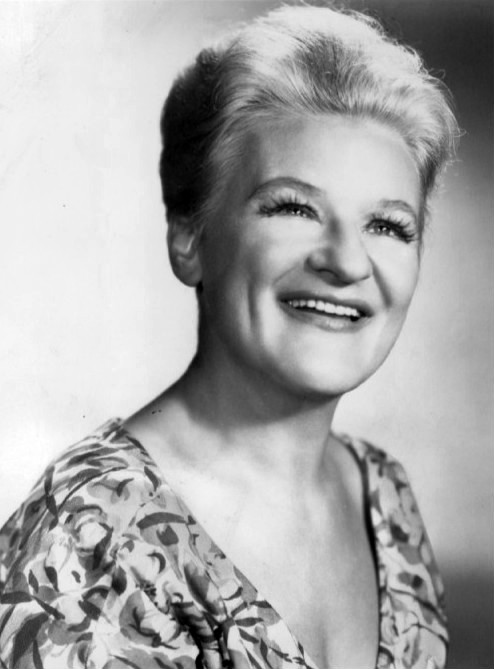
Anna Russell

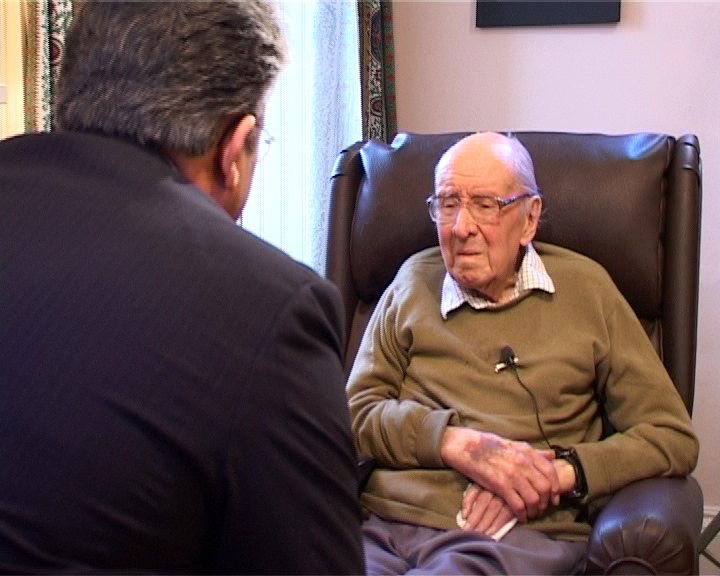
William Montgomery Watt (right)

- 1 October – Alan Caillou, writer (born 1914)
- 3 October
  - Lucilla Andrews, author of romantic novels (born 1919)
  - John Crank, physicist (born 1916)
  - Don Thompson, race walker (born 1933)
- 4 October
  - Tom Bell, actor (born 1933)
  - Walter Gibb, RAF air ace and test pilot (born 1919)
- 5 October – Jennifer Moss, actress (born 1945)
- 9 October
  - Reg Freeson, politician (born 1926)
  - Paul Hunter, snooker player (born 1978)
- 10 October
  - Derek Pattinson, Anglican prelate (born 1930)
  - Monique Viner, judge (born 1926)
- 11 October – Robert Megarry, judge (born 1910)
- 14 October – James Barr, biblical scholar (born 1924)
- 15 October
  - Derek Bond, actor (born 1920)
  - Michael Forrester, Army major-general (born 1917)
- 16 October – Ross Davidson, actor (born 1949)
- 17 October – Ursula Moray Williams, children's author (born 1911)
- 18 October
  - Anna Russell, British-born comedian and music satirist (born 1911)
  - Laurie Taitt, Olympic sprint hurdler (born 1934)
- 19 October – Ralph Harris, Baron Harris of High Cross, economist (born 1924)
- 20 October – Eric Newby, travel writer (born 1919)
- 21 October
  - Peter Barkworth, actor (born 1929)
  - Arthur Peacocke, theologian and biochemist (born 1924)
- 22 October – Michael Mayne, Anglican priest, Dean of Westminster Abbey (1986–1996) (born 1929)
- 24 October – William Montgomery Watt, professor of Islamic Studies at the University of Edinburgh (born 1909)
- 22 October – Richard Mayes, actor (born 1922)
- 25 October – Paul Ableman, novelist (born 1927)
- 28 October – Brian Brolly, showbusiness entrepreneur (born 1936)
- 29 October – Nigel Kneale, screenwriter and husband of Judith Kerr (born 1922)
- 31 October
  - William Franklyn, actor (born 1925)
  - Peter Fryer, Marxist actor and journalist (born 1927)

=== November ===
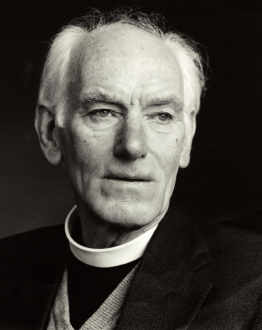
John McManners

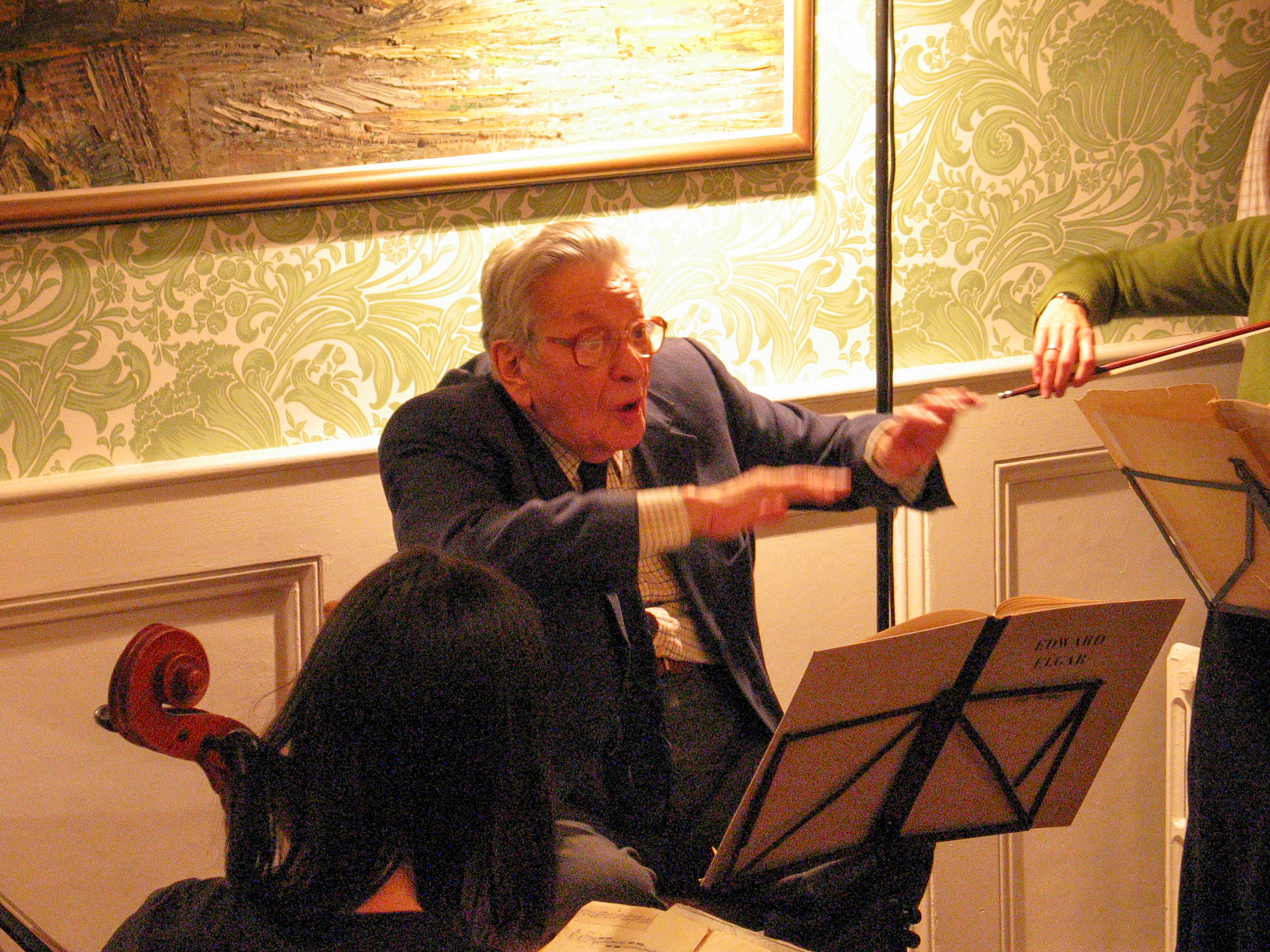
Emanuel Hurwitz

- 4 November
  - Brebis Bleaney, physicist (born 1917)
  - John McManners, clergyman and historian (born 1916)
- 7 November – Elizabeth Balneaves, writer and filmmaker (born 1902)
- 10 November
  - Diana Coupland, actress (born 1928)
  - Chubby Oates, actor and comedian (born 1942)
- 11 November – Ronnie Stevens, actor (born 1925)
- 13 November – Desert Orchid, National Hunt racehorse (born 1979)
- 14 November – John Hallam, actor (born 1941)
- 16 November – John Veale, composer (born 1922)
- 17 November – John Acland, Army major-general (born 1928)
- 18 November – Keith Rowlands, rugby union player (born 1936)
- 19 November
  - William G. Beasley, Oriental historian (born 1919)
  - Edward Ford, courtier, Private Secretary to the British monarch (1946–1967) (born 1910)
  - Emanuel Hurwitz, violinist (born 1919)
- 20 November – William R. P. George, solicitor, poet and Archdruid of Wales, nephew of David Lloyd George (born 1912)
- 22 November – John Peyton, Baron Peyton of Yeovil, politician and former Transport minister (born 1919)
- 23 November
  - Nick Clarke, radio and television presenter (born 1948)
  - Richard Clements, journalist (born 1928)
  - Alexander Litvinenko, Russian defector; dies in Britain after being poisoned (born 1962)
- 26 November – Anthony Jackson, actor (born 1944)
- 27 November – Alan Freeman, DJ and radio personality (born 1927 in Australia)
- 28 November – Bernard Orchard, biblical scholar (born 1910)
- 29 November – Allen Carr, anti-smoking campaigner (born 1934)
- 30 November – Colin Cramphorn, Chief Constable of West Yorkshire Police since 2002 (born 1956)

=== December ===
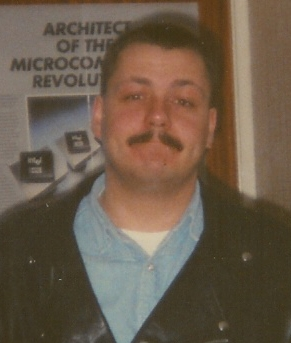
Craig Hinton

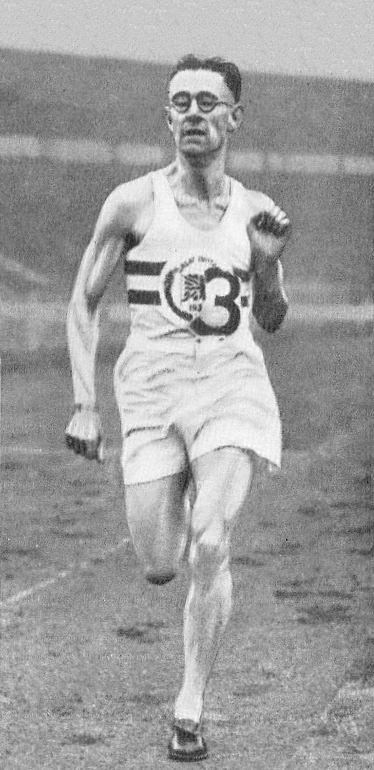
Sydney Wooderson

- 3 December – Craig Hinton, writer (born 1964)
- 4 December
  - Peter Gadsden, engineer, trader and Lord Mayor of London (1979–1980) (born 1929)
  - Rodney Needham, social anthropologist (born 1923)
- 5 December
  - Gerry Humphreys, sound engineer (born 1931)
  - Timothy Moxon, actor (born 1924)
- 6 December
  - Darren Brown, guitarist and lead singer (Mega City Four) (born 1962)
  - Mavis Pugh, actress (born 1914)
- 8 December – Colin Figures, head of the Secret Intelligence Service (1981–1985) (born 1925)
- 9 December – Tremayne Rodd, 3rd Baron Rennell, rugby union player (born 1935)
- 10 December – Kenneth Cummins, sailor in both World Wars (born 1900)
- 12 December – Charles Stourton, 26th Baron Mowbray, peer (born 1923)
- 13 December – Eileen Caddy, spiritual teacher, founder of the Findhorn Foundation (born 1917, Egypt)
- 14 December
  - John Bridge, World War II sailor (born 1915)
  - John Hamilton, politician (born 1922)
- 15 December – Frank Johnson, journalist, editor of the Spectator magazine (1995–1999) (born 1943)
- 16 December – John Rae, educator, headmaster of Westminster School (1970–1986) (born 1931)
- 18 December – Mike Dickin, DJ and radio personality (car accident) (born 1943)
- 19 December – Elisabeth Rivers-Bulkeley, first woman member of the London Stock Exchange (born 1922)
- 20 December – Mick Mulligan, jazz trumpeter (born 1928)
- 21 December
  - Philippa Pearce, children's author (born 1920)
  - Sydney Wooderson, lawyer and athlete, world record holder for mile run (1937–1942) (born 1914)
- 22 December – Richard Boston, journalist (born 1938)
- 23 December – Charlie Drake, comedian (born 1925)
- 25 December – John Butcher, politician (born 1946)
- 26 December – John Heath-Stubbs, poet and translator (born 1918)
- 27 December – Marmaduke Hussey, Baron Hussey of North Bradley, chairman of the board of Governors of the BBC (born 1923)
- 28 December
  - Gracie Cole, trumpeter and bandleader (born 1924)
  - Mandy Mitchell-Innes, English cricketer (born 1914)
- 30 December
  - Elizabeth Greenhill, bookbinder (born 1907)
  - Antony Lambton, politician (born 1922)

== See also ==
- 2006 in British music
- 2006 in British television
- List of British films of 2006
- 2006 in England
