= 2006 in Wales =

- Centuries: 19th; 20th; 21st
- Decades: 1980s; 1990s; 2000s; 2010s; 2020s
- See also: List of years in Wales; Timeline of Welsh history 2006 in The United Kingdom England Scotland Elsewhere Welsh football: 2005–06 • 2006–07

This article is about the particular significance of the year 2006 to Wales and its people.

== Incumbents ==
- First Minister – Rhodri Morgan
- Secretary of State for Wales – Peter Hain
- Archbishop of Wales – Barry Morgan, Bishop of Llandaff
- Archdruid of the National Eisteddfod of Wales – Selwyn Iolen

== Events ==
=== January - June ===
- 8 January – four members of Rhyl Cycling Club are killed in a road accident near Abergele.
- February – at its spring conference, Plaid Cymru announces several changes to its public image; it is announced that 'Plaid' will be used as the party's name, although 'Plaid Cymru – The Party of Wales' remains the official title. The party's colours are changed to yellow from the traditional green and red, and the party logo is changed from the 'triban' used since 1933 to a yellow Welsh poppy (Meconopsis cambrica). Ieuan Wyn Jones is designated party leader.
- 13 February – Gwenno Teifi Ffransis, granddaughter of Gwynfor Evans, becomes the first Welsh language protester to be sent to jail since 1995; she is sentenced to five days imprisonment for refusing to pay damages imposed by a court for damaging Radio Carmarthenshire's Narberth studio in protest over its lack of Welsh broadcasts.
- 16 February – Julien Macdonald and some of his models are pelted with flour bombs by animal rights campaigners disapproving of the use of fur in his fashion designs.
- 22 February – as the Prince of Wales's (now Charles III from 2023) court case against The Mail on Sunday continues in the High Court, revelations include the fact that he considers himself a dissident.
- 1 March – The Queen opens the new Senedd building in Cardiff.
- 13 March – Dafydd Wigley announces that he is considering a political comeback.
- 5 April – legendary American singer Gene Pitney is found dead in his Cardiff hotel room after an outstanding concert performance at St David's Hall.
- 16 April – the first Welsh International Harp Festival opens at Caernarfon.
- May – two Big Brother contestants, Imogen Thomas and Glyn Wise, are told not to use the Welsh language for private conversations; the ruling is reversed after a formal complaint from the Welsh Language Society.
- 7 May – Russell T Davies wins the Dennis Potter Award at the BAFTA television awards ceremony.
- 27 – 28 May – The Full Ponty music festival is launched.
- 29 May – Max Boyce headlines at a concert in Pontypridd to celebrate the 150th anniversary of the Welsh national anthem; also appearing are Rhod Gilbert, Mike Peters, Shân Cothi, and Hayley Westenra.
- 9 June – Rhodri Morgan opens Anglesey Coastal Path.
- 17 June
  - Lynn Davies is appointed a Commander of the Order of the British Empire (CBE).
  - Julien Macdonald is awarded the OBE.
- 29 June – in the Blaenau Gwent by-elections:
  - Trish Law succeeds her late husband Peter Law as Independent Assembly Member for Blaenau Gwent;
  - Dai Davies becomes the new Independent Member of Parliament for Blaenau Gwent.

=== July - December ===
- 4 July – Alun Pugh announces that the planned merger of the Welsh Language Board with the Welsh Assembly Government, announced in 2004, will be postponed until after the next Assembly elections in 2007.
- 5 July – the Prince of Wales is presented with a £150,000 gold leaf harp by Salvi Harps, for use by the Official Harpist to the Prince of Wales.
- 20 July – the NDA announced that Wylfa power station will be shut down in 2010.
- 5 August – the 2006 National Eisteddfod of Wales opens in Swansea.
- 17 August – in the Clydach murders re-trial, David Morris is for a second time found guilty of four murders.
- 15 September – the Conservative Party in Wales adopts a sessile oak as its new emblem.
- 26 September – for the first time in a Welsh court, the mother of a murder victim is allowed to make a statement following the conviction of her daughter's killer.
- 28 September – Health minister Brian Gibbons admits that the NHS Wales is £100 million in debt.
- 12 October – The Automatic apologise publicly for trashing the GMTV set, excusing themselves on the grounds that they were still drunk from the previous night and had had only a few minutes' notice that they were due to perform on the show.
- November – it becomes known that the Prince of Wales is in process of acquiring Llwynywermod, a farmhouse in Carmarthenshire, for his personal use as a holiday residence; it is the first house he has bought in Wales.
- 3 November – Jones Jones Jones, an event held at the Millennium Stadium in Cardiff, succeeds in breaking the world record for the largest gathering of people with the same surname in one place.
- 24 November – Ferndale Rugby Club welcomes celebrity guests to the grand opening of its 'Sir Stanley Baker Lounge'.
- 9 December – Welsh actor Owain Yeoman marries Lucy Davis at St Paul's Cathedral in London.
- 27 December – Torchwood star John Barrowman and architect Scott Gill become civil partners at a small ceremony in Cardiff.

== Arts and culture ==
- Gwyn Thomas succeeds Gwyneth Lewis as National Poet of Wales.

=== Awards ===
- Glyndŵr Award – Rhian Samuel
- National Eisteddfod of Wales: Chair – Gwynfor ab Ifor
- National Eisteddfod of Wales: Crown – Eigra Lewis Roberts
- National Eisteddfod of Wales: Prose Medal – Fflur Dafydd
- Urdd National Eisteddfod: Chair – Eurig Salisbury
- Urdd National Eisteddfod: Crown – Gwenno Mair Davies
- Wales Book of the Year:
  - English language: Robert Minhinnick – To Babel and Back
  - Welsh language: Rhys Evans – Gwynfor: Rhag Pob Brad
- Dylan Thomas Award: Rachel Trezise
- Cân i Gymru: Ryland Teifi – 'Lili'r nos'

=== New books ===
==== Welsh language ====
- Tony Bianchi – Esgyrn Bach
- T. Robin Chapman – Un Bywyd o Blith Nifer: Cofiant Saunders Lewis
- Catrin Dafydd – Pili Pala
- Bethan Gwanas – Hi Oedd fy Ffrind
- Gwen Pritchard Jones – Dygwyl Eneidiau
- Llwyd Owen:
  - Ffawd, Cywilydd a Chelwyddau
  - Ffydd Gobaith Cariad
- Gwyn Thomas – Bywyd Bach
- Cynwil Williams – Rowan Williams – Yr Archesgob

==== English language ====
- Dannie Abse – Running Late
- Nigel Jenkins – Hotel Gwales
- Lloyd Jones – Mr Cassini
- Jamie Owen – Welsh Journeys
- Ann Pettitt – Walking to Greenham
- Byron Rogers – The Man Who Went into the West: The Life of R. S. Thomas
- Peter Shaw – Hole: Kidnapped in Georgia
- Sarah Waters – The Night Watch

=== Music ===
- Adequate 7 – Here On Earth
- The Automatic – Not Accepted Anywhere
- James Dean Bradfield – The Great Western
- Euros Childs – Chops
- Froncysyllte Male Voice Choir – Voices of the Valley
- People in Planes – As Far As The Eye Can See...

== Film ==
- Catherine Zeta-Jones is cast as Hollywood star Lana Turner in the film Stompanato (release due in 2007).
- Ioan Gruffudd plays William Wilberforce in Michael Apted's new film, Amazing Grace.
- Jonathan Pryce begins filming Pirates of the Caribbean 3.
- Gower Boy, made by artist Gee Vaucher and musician Huw Warren, is premiered at the 14th Raindance Film Festival.
- Lloyd Owen stars in Miss Potter.

== Broadcasting ==
- Michael Sheen stars as Kenneth Williams in Fantabulosa, Nero in the drama-documentary series Ancient Rome: the Rise and Fall of an Empire, and H. G. Wells in H G Wells: War with the World.
- Huw Edwards presents a St David's Day drama-documentary on the career of Owain Glyndŵr.
- The new series of Doctor Who is filmed in Wales by BBC Wales and produced by Russell T Davies; Davies also produces Torchwood, a spin-off series featuring John Barrowman.
- Andrew Davies's adaptation of Bleak House for the BBC wins several awards at the annual BAFTA ceremony in May.
- Aled Jones leaves Classic FM to become a BBC radio presenter.
- 5 November, Swansea Bay Radio on air for the first time.

=== Welsh-language television ===
- Caerdydd
- Calon Gaeth (drama serial)
- Cowbois ac Injans
- Mastermind Cymru
- O Na! Y Morgans!

=== English-language television ===
- The Charlotte Church Show (Channel 4)
- Drowning of a Village (BBC2)
- Supernova, starring Rob Brydon
- Torchwood
- Young Dracula filmed at Caerphilly Castle

== Sport ==
- 1 January – athlete Timothy Benjamin, the UK's top 400m runner in 2006, announces that he will not be fully fit for the 2006 Commonwealth Games.
- 13 February – Wales rugby union coach Mike Ruddock announces his shock resignation.
- 5 March – Joe Calzaghe defeats Jeff Lacy to retain the International Boxing Federation (IBF) world super-middleweight boxing championship.
- 10 March – Ian Woosnam is appointed 'ambassador' for Welsh golf in the run-up to the 2010 Ryder Cup, to be held at the Celtic Manor Resort near Newport.
- 16 March – swimmer David Davies wins a bronze medal on the first day's competition in the 2006 Commonwealth Games at Melbourne, Australia.
- 20 March – sprinter Christian Malcolm pulls a hamstring in the 100m heats and is forced to withdraw from the Games.
- 26 March – Team Wales completes the Commonwealth Games having met and surpassed its target of 18 medals; the team won 3 gold, 5 silver, and 11 bronze medals in total.
- 26 March – Mark Williams wins his second China Open title.
- 13 May – owing to the late completion of Wembley Stadium, the FA Cup Final is held at Cardiff's Millennium Stadium for the sixth year in a row.
- October – Peter Ridsdale replaces Sam Hammam as chairman of Cardiff City F.C.
- 4 October – the Football Association of Wales signs two-year sponsorship deal with Welsh drinks and hospitality company Brains.
- 10 October – it is announced that a bust of the former Wales, Leeds, and Juventus football star John Charles is to be put on display at Swansea Liberty Stadium.
- 11 October – Cardiff Athletics Stadium wins the Club Future Partnership of the Year 2006 Cup from UK Athletics for its continued partnership with other organisations throughout the city and its support of events and athletes.
- 14 October – in boxing, Joe Calzaghe successfully defends his WBO/IBF World Super-Middleweight title defence against Sakio Bika.
- 15 October – Cardiff Marathon 2006
- 29 October – a record 1,500 runners takes part in the 25th National Trust Snowdonia Marathon; the winner for the fifth time is Dennis Walmsley.
- 2 November – golf: the team of Rhys Davies, Nigel Edwards, and Llewellyn Matthews takes Wales to fourth place at the World Amateur Team Championships in Stelle.
- 4 November – rugby union: Wales draw with Australia in the first Autumn International Test Match of 2006.
- 18 to 19 November – cycling: International Sprint Omnium takes place at the Wales National Velodrome in Newport.
- BBC Wales Sports Personality of the Year – Joe Calzaghe

== Deaths ==
- 5 January – Merlyn Rees, Labour politician, 85
- 9 January – Selwyn Hughes, minister and writer, 85
- 15 January – Glyn Berry, Welsh-born Canadian diplomat, 59
- 23 January – Charles Fisher, journalist, writer, poet and adventurer, 91
- 5 February – Peter Philp, dramatist and antiques expert, 85
- 9 February – Aubrey Darmody, footballer, 84
- 21 February – Stefan Terlezki, politician, 78
- 13 March – Roy Clarke, footballer, 80
- 18 March – Glyn Davidge, Wales international and British Lion rugby player, 72
- 6 April – Leslie Norris, poet and author, 84
- 19 April – Ken Jones, rugby player, 84
- 25 April – Peter Law, politician, 58
- 23 May – Ray Cale, dual code international rugby player, 83
- 29 May – Wyn Griffiths, footballer, 86
- 1 June – Gerald James, actor, 88
- 2 June – Leon Pownall, Wrexham-born actor, 63
- 25 June – Kenneth Griffith, actor and documentary maker, 84
- 23 July – John Samuel Rowlands, George Cross recipient, 90
- 25 July – Dewi Zephaniah Phillips, philosopher, 71
- 13 August – Jack Edwards, soldier and activist, 88
- 30 August – Glenn Ford, Canadian actor of Welsh parentage, 90
- 1 September – Sir Kyffin Williams, artist, 88
- 27 September – Tommy Harris, former rugby player, 79
- 21 October – Urien Wiliam, novelist and dramatist, 76
- 2 November – Leslie Manfield, Wales international rugby union player, 91
- 18 November – Keith Rowlands, rugby union player and administrator, 70
- 20 November – Dr William R. P. George, solicitor and poet, 94
- 5 December – Gerry Humphreys, sound engineer, 75
- 12 December – Ivor Barry, actor, 87

== See also ==
- 2006 in England
- 2006 in Scotland
- 2006 in Northern Ireland
