= 2006 in Scotland =

- Centuries: 19th; 20th; 21st
- Decades: 1980s; 1990s; 2000s; 2010s; 2020s
- See also: List of years in Scotland; Timeline of Scottish history 2006 in: The UK • England • Wales • Elsewhere; Scottish football: 2005–06 • 2006–07; 2006 in Scottish television

Events from the year 2006 in Scotland.

== Incumbents ==
- First Minister and Keeper of the Great Seal – Jack McConnell
- Secretary of State for Scotland – Alistair Darling until 5 May; then Douglas Alexander

=== Law officers ===
- Lord Advocate – Lord Boyd of Duncansby; then Elish Angiolini
- Solicitor General for Scotland – Elish Angiolini; then John Beckett
- Advocate General for Scotland – Lynda Clark; then Lord Davidson of Glen Clova

=== Judiciary ===
- Lord President of the Court of Session and Lord Justice General – Lord Hamilton
- Lord Justice Clerk – Lord Gill
- Chairman of the Scottish Land Court – Lord McGhie

== Events ==
=== January ===
- 1 January – Transport Scotland begins operations as an agency of the Scottish Executive.
- 7 January – Charles Kennedy, leader of the Liberal Democrats resigns after revelations that he has a drinking problem.

=== February ===
- 9 February – Dunfermline and West Fife by-election: Willie Rennie of the Liberal Democrats is the winner.

=== March ===
- 2 March
  - Sir Menzies Campbell is elected leader of the Liberal Democrats following an election caused by the resignation of Charles Kennedy.
  - Four people are injured in an explosion in a GlaxoSmithKline factory in Irvine, North Ayrshire.
- 15–26 March – Scotland at the 2006 Commonwealth Games.
- 26 March – Scottish public smoking ban comes into effect under the conditions of the Smoking, Health and Social Care Act (Scotland) 2005, banning people from smoking indoors in public places like restaurants, pubs and cafes; the first region of the UK to prohibit smoking inside public buildings.
- 28 March – Royal Regiment of Scotland created; King's Own Scottish Borderers and The Royal Scots disbanded.

=== April ===
- 27 April – Moray by-election: Richard Lochhead holds the seat in the Scottish Parliament for the Scottish National Party.

=== May ===
- 30 May – Scottish TV and Grampian TV both relaunched under the new name of STV.

=== July ===
- 4 July – Sheridan v News Group Newspapers Ltd: Scottish Socialist Party MSP Tommy Sheridan begins an action for defamation against the News of the World at the Court of Session in Edinburgh. Sheridan's case is upheld but he is later prosecuted for perjury.
- 15 July – the first Paradise Island Adventure Golf venue opened at Xscape Braehead in Renfrew.

=== August ===
- 21 August – the first modern solely Gaelic-medium school to offer secondary education, Sgoil Ghàidhlig Ghlaschu, is opened at Woodside in Glasgow.
- Scotland's first offshore wind turbine is installed in the Beatrice Wind Farm, 24 km (15 mi; 13 nmi) offshore in the Moray Firth.
- The Scottish crossbill is finally confirmed as a unique species.

=== September ===
- 3 September – establishment of Solidarity – Scotland's Socialist Movement, a breakaway from the Scottish Socialist Party.
- 18 September – the Clyde Arc, a pedestrian/cycle bridge over the River Clyde at Finnieston, is officially opened.

=== October ===
- 5 October – Rt. Hon. Elish Angiolini, QC, appointed as Lord Advocate. She is the first woman, first procurator fiscal, and the first solicitor to be appointed to the post.
- 11–13 October – multi-party political talks on Northern Ireland are held in St Andrews, resulting in the St Andrews Agreement.

=== November ===
- 8 November – three men of Pakistani origin sentenced to life imprisonment for the racist murder of Kriss Donald in Glasgow.
- 25–26 November – Aberdeen Cup tennis tournament.
- 30 November – residents of Benbecula take control of a large part of the island in a community buy-out.

=== Undated ===
- A fossil pterosaur found on the Isle of Skye is revealed in 2024 to be a species new to paleontology.

== Deaths ==
- 5 January – Rachel Squire, Labour MP (born 1954)
- 31 January – Moira Shearer, ballet dancer and actress (born 1926)
- 9 February – Ena Lamont Stewart, playwright (born 1912)
- 10 February – John Prentice, football player and manager (born 1926)
- 28 February – Hugh McCartney, Labour MP (born 1920)
- 3 March – Ivor Cutler, poet, songwriter and humourist (born 1923)
- 12 March – Jimmy Johnstone, footballer; member of the Scottish Sports Hall of Fame (born 1944)
- 21 March – Margaret Ewing, Scottish National Party MSP and former MP (born 1945)
- 27 March – Ian Hamilton Finlay, writer, artist and gardener (born 1925)
- 9 April – Robin Orr, composer (born 1909)
- 13 April – Muriel Spark, novelist (born 1918)
- 15 April – Calum Kennedy, singer (born 1928)
- 8 May – Iain Macmillan, photographer and author (born 1938)
- 17 May – Eric Forth, Conservative MP (born 1944)
- 6 July – Tom Weir, climber, author and broadcaster (born 1914)
- 30 August – Hector Monro, Baron Monro of Langholm, Conservative and Unionist MP (born 1922)
- 15 September – Douglas Henderson, Scottish National Party MP (born 1935)
- 3 October – Lucilla Andrews, romantic novelist (born 1919 in Egypt)

== Arts ==
- February – National Theatre of Scotland established as a peripatetic company.
- 1 August – Gregory Burke's play Black Watch is first performed, by the National Theatre of Scotland at the Edinburgh Festival Fringe'.
- Hamish MacDonald self-publishes The Willies and Idea in Stone.
- James Robertson publishes The Testament of Gideon Mack.

== See also ==
- 2006 in England
- 2006 in Northern Ireland
- 2006 in Wales
