= 2006 in England =

- Centuries: 19th; 20th; 21st
- Decades: 1980s; 1990s; 2000s; 2010s; 2020s
- See also: 2005–06 in English football 2006–07 in English football 2006 in the United Kingdom; Other events of 2006

Events from 2006 in England

== Incumbent ==
- Monarch - Elizabeth II
- Prime Minister - Tony Blair

== Events ==
=== January ===
- 20 January – River Thames whale: a whale is discovered swimming in the River Thames in London.
- 24 January – Sven-Göran Eriksson announces that he will quit as manager of the England national football team after this summer's World Cup in Germany. Eriksson, 57, has been in charge of the England team for five years and, as a Swede, is the first non-English manager of the England team.

=== February ===
- 3 February – Islamist demonstration outside Danish Embassy in London in response to the Jyllands-Posten Muhammad cartoons controversy.
- 9 February – The Government announces that the Child Support Agency is to be abolished.
- 19 February – The BAFTA awards take place in London.
- 22 February – Securitas depot robbery: around £53 million (US$92 million) is stolen in the largest cash robbery in British crime history.
- 27 February – Writers Michael Baigent and Richard Leigh sue Random House in the High Court of Justice claiming that the best selling novel The Da Vinci Code by Dan Brown contains ideas stolen from their 1982 book The Holy Blood and the Holy Grail.

=== March ===
- 20 March – The British Press Awards are held at The Dorchester, Park Lane, London.
- 28 March – Council workers strike over pension rights.

=== April ===
- 7 April – Mr Justice Peter Smith delivers judgment in the copyright case over The Da Vinci Code finding that Dan Brown had not breached the copyright of Michael Baigent and Richard Leigh. The judgment itself contained a coded message on the whim of the judge.
- 12 April – Prince Harry passed out as a commissioned officer during the Sovereign's Parade at the Royal Military Academy Sandhurst.
- 18 April – Peugeot announces plans to close the 60-year-old car factory at Ryton near Coventry, which it bought from Chrysler in 1979, within the next year.
- 21 April – Elizabeth II celebrates her 80th birthday at Windsor.

=== May ===
- 4 May
  - Local government elections take place in some areas of England.
  - Steve McClaren, manager of Middlesbrough F.C., agrees to become the next manager of the England national football team after the World Cup.

=== June ===
- 9 June–11 June – The British Grand Prix is held at the Silverstone Circuit and is won by reigning world champion Fernando Alonso ahead of Michael Schumacher and Kimi Räikkönen, while local hero Jenson Button retired earlier in the race with an engine oil leak.
- 10 June – The England football team's World Cup campaign begins with a 1–0 win over Paraguay.
- 15 June – England beat Trinidad and Tobago 2-0 in their second World Cup group game.
- 20 June – England go through to the knockout stages of the World Cup with a 2–2 draw against Sweden in their final group game.
- 25 June
  - Children's Party at the Palace held in honour of The Queen's 80th birthday.
  - The Lord Chancellor, Lord Falconer, rejects calls from families of murder victims for all convicted murderers to be sentenced to no less than a minimum of 25 years in prison.
  - England go through to the World Cup quarter-finals for the second tournament in succession by beating Ecuador 1-0 with a goal from captain David Beckham.
- 29 June – Bromley and Chislehurst by-election won by Bob Neill for the Conservative Party.

=== July ===
- July – European heat wave affects the UK.
- 1 July – England's World Cup quest ends in the quarter-finals when they lose on penalties to Portugal after a goalless draw.
- 22 July – Arsenal F.C. move into the Emirates Stadium, named after the airline company as part of a 15-year sponsorship deal, after 93 years at nearby Highbury. The 60,000-seat stadium is the largest club stadium to have been built in English football since Maine Road, which was home of Manchester City from 1923 to 2003.

=== August ===
- 1 August – Steve McClaren is officially appointed as manager of the England national football team.
- 10 August – Police make many arrests in relation to a transatlantic aircraft plot, and tight security measures are instigated at airports.

=== September ===
- 9 September – Helen Mirren awarded best actress at the Venice Film Festival for her role in The Queen, portraying Elizabeth II following the death of Diana, Princess of Wales.
- 20 September – Television presenter Richard Hammond suffers a serious brain injury when he crashes a jet-powered car whilst filming for Top Gear.

=== October ===
- 1 October – Regulatory Reform (Fire Safety) Order 2005 comes into effect, requiring a Fire Risk Assessment for all non-domestic premises in England and Wales.
- 26 October – The Duke of Edinburgh officially opens Arsenal's new stadium.

=== November ===
- 2 November – Volunteers from the Royal British Legion's Lloyd's of London Branch organise the first London Poppy Day to raise funds for the Poppy Appeal.
- 23 November – Alexander Litvinenko dies in London having been poisoned by Polonium-210.

=== December ===
- 2 December – A young woman's body is found in a brook near Ipswich; her death is initially treated as "unexplained".
- 4 December – The woman whose corpse was found in Ipswich two days ago is identified as Gemma Adams, a 25-year-old local prostitute. Her death is reported to be suspicious and police launch a murder inquiry. There are also concerns about another Ipswich prostitute, 19-year-old Tania Nicol, who went missing on 30 October.
- 7 December – A tornado hits London.
- 8 December – The body of missing Ipswich prostitute Tania Nicol is found on the outskirts of the town.
- 9 December – Police in Ipswich launch a murder investigation into the death of Tania Nicol and admit that it is likely she met her death at the hands of the same person or people who killed Gemma Adams.
- 10 December – A third prostitute's body is found in the Ipswich area.
- 14 December – Two more women are found dead in Ipswich and it is confirmed that both are prostitutes, meaning that the police are now investigating five murders.
- 12 December – The Ryton car factory closes and Peugeot 206 production is transferred to Slovakia, several months ahead of the scheduled closure date. 2,300 jobs are lost.
- 18 December – A 37-year-old man is arrested near Felixstowe on suspicion of murdering the five Ipswich prostitutes. He is named as Tom Stephens, a 37-year-old Tesco supermarket worker.
- 19 December – A second man, 48-year-old Forklift truck driver Steve Wright, is arrested in connection with the Ipswich prostitute murders, while police are given more time to question the first suspect.
- 21 December – Steve Wright is charged with the Ipswich prostitute murders, while Tom Stephens is released on bail pending further inquiries.
- 25 December – After 21 years on the show, the character Pauline Fowler, played by Wendy Richard dies of a brain tumour in Albert Square on Christmas Day. Her best friend Dot Branning (played by June Brown), Pauline's son Martin Fowler and her nephew Ian Beale find her dead in the square. Almost 12 million viewers watch her exit and made it the most-watched show this Christmas.

== Births ==
- 20 January – Ethan Wheatley, Malaysian footballer
- 30 September – Daniel Batty, Malaysian footballer

== Deaths ==
- 8 January – Priscilla Young, social worker (born 1925)
- 18 October – Laurie Taitt, Olympic sprint hurdler (born 1934)

== See also ==
- 2006 in Northern Ireland
- 2006 in Scotland
- 2006 in Wales
