= 2006 in Scottish television =

This is a list of events in Scottish television from 2006.

== Events ==
- January – It is announced that Scottish Screen will amalgamate with the Scottish Arts Council to form the newly created Creative Scotland.
- 2 March – STV Group plc announce that Scottish Television will be known onscreen as STV. Grampian will also rebrand.
- 30 May – Scottish Television becomes known as STV Central and Grampian Television as STV North.
- July – Launch of the STV website stv.tv.
- 29 August – SMG officially rejects a merger offer from Northern Irish ITV franchise holder UTV. The merger approach would have given SMG shareholders a 52% stake in the combined company.

== Debuts ==
=== BBC ===
- 10 February – That Was The Team That Was on BBC One (2006–2008)

== Television series ==
- Scotsport (1957–2008)
- Reporting Scotland (1968–1983; 1984–present)
- Scotland Today (1972–2009)
- Sportscene (1975–present)
- The Beechgrove Garden (1978–present)
- Grampian Today (1980–2009) (rebranded as North Tonight)
- Taggart (1983–2010)
- Only an Excuse? (1993–2020)
- Still Game (2002–2007; 2016–2019)
- River City (2002–2026)
- Politics Now (2004–2011)
- VideoGaiden (2005–2008)
- The Adventure Show (2005–present)

== Ending this year ==
- 7 April – The Karen Dunbar Show (2003–2006)

== Deaths ==
- 6 July – Tom Weir, 91, cricketer, author, and broadcaster

== See also ==
- 2006 in Scotland
