= Alice Baker =

Alice Baker may refer to:

- Alice Baker (veteran) (1898–2006), British World War I service veteran
- Alice Baker (set decorator)
- Alice Graham Baker (1864–1932), founder Houston Settlement Association

== See also ==
- Louisa Alice Baker (1856–1926), English-born New Zealand journalist and novelist
