= Gartocharn =

Coordinates: 56.0419°N 4.5274°W

Gartocharn: Scottish Gaelic: Gart a’ Chàirn
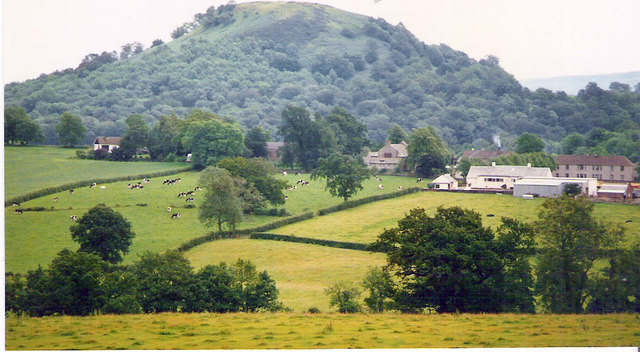
- Looking south east to Duncryne Hill

- Location within West Dunbartonshire
- Population: 680
- OS grid reference: NS4286
- Civil parish: Kilmaronock
- Council area: West Dunbartonshire
- Lieutenancy area: Dunbartonshire
- Country: Scotland
- Sovereign state: United Kingdom
- Post town: ALEXANDRIA
- Postcode district: G83
- Dialling code: 01389
- Police: Scotland
- Fire: Scottish
- Ambulance: Scottish
- UK Parliament: West Dunbartonshire
- Scottish Parliament: Dumbarton
- Website: gartocharn.org

Gartocharn (Scottish Gaelic: Gart a’ Chàirn [ˈkarˠʃt̪ ə ˈxaːrˠɲ]) is a village in West Dunbartonshire in Scotland, United Kingdom. It is the only village in the parish of Kilmaronock (not to be confused with the town of Kilmarnock in East Ayrshire). The parish has a population of c. 680.

It lies on the A811, the main road from Balloch to Stirling. It is close to the shore of Loch Lomond, and to Ross Priory. It is dominated by a nearby hill, Duncryne, also known as the Kilmaronock Dumpling.

The village has two churches, a primary school, convenience shop and garage. There is a weekly fruit and vegetable market held at France Farm. The former Gartocharn Hotel is now closed The local bi-monthly magazine is known as the ‘Gartorag’.

Historically, the village's economy was based on agriculture, being surrounded by many large farms and estates. In recent years, this has dwindled, however, there is still a large haulage firm, Coopers, and the Lochs and Glens holiday company based in the village.

Sir Walter Scott is reputed to have written Lady of the Lake whilst staying at Ross Priory and Gartochraggan, on the waters edge, north of the village.

In the 1870s and 1880s, the village had a football side, Kilmaronock Thistle F.C., which played in the Scottish Cup.

== Notable residents ==
It was the home of Tom Weir MBE and his wife Rona, who for many years was the primary school headteacher.

Actor David McCallum briefly lived in the village with his mother as a child during World War Two.

The film producer and director brothers Andrew Macdonald and Kevin Macdonald grew up in the vicinity.

Prominent Glasgow financier and environmentalist Sir Raymond Johnstone lived at the Wards Estate.

Alastair Pearson farmed on the edge of the village.

Each year, the village is the home of a Convention of the Two by Twos.
