= O Na! Y Morgans! =

Welsh television series

O Na! Y Morgans! (English: Oh No! The Morgans!) is an animated Welsh-speaking drama for children set on S4C, starring Morgan Hopkin and Lilo Millward in the main roles.

Starring: Morgan Hopkin, Llio Millward, Ceri Lloyd, Daniel Gwyn Hughes and Christine Pritchard.

== Characters ==
(Morgan Hopkin) Dafydd Morgan is a silly easy-going, lazy and quite dim-witted comic artist, unable to think up new ideas. He is forced by his wife, the strict Rhiannon, to do work, though he would much rather sleep all day. However, he has been shown to have a love of D.I.Y., despite being awful at it. He and Huw get along very well, and on numerous times, plot against Sian.

(Llio Millward) Rhiannon Morgan is the complete opposite of Dafydd, efficient and confident, she runs the family well. Her job is selling houses, and a running gag in the show is that a buyer will carry on changing his mind about the house. She is bad-tempered, however, and prone to shout.

(Ceri Lloyd) Sian Morgan is a teenage bad-girl, and the rival of Huw. She is sly and sneaky and lies to the family quite often. She fights with her brother, Huw, and often has the last laugh. Her room is black. She is very pretty, and knows it.

(Daniel Gwyn Hughes) Huw Morgan is the youngest of the family, being a lively pre-teen bent on making his older sister's life a living Hell. He has his own kind of mischievous intelligence and has a special bond with his dad, Dafydd. He likes Football, car-racing and any other sport remotely dangerous.

(Christine Pritchard) Mrs Rusty is the neighbour of the Morgans and a friend of Rhiannon, while on bad terms with Dafydd, Sian and Huw. She speaks with a distinctive Northern-Welsh accent, and is obsessed with tradition, as well as chapel.

A running gag in the show is the mice living in the walls, who are set to wage war on the Morgans. They include two young mice and their grandparent, whom they often torment and try to get rid of.
