= The Poppy Girls =

British pop band

The Poppy Girls is a British pop band consisting of five school-age girls from Armed Forces families. The band was first formed in 2013 with the intent to raise money for The Royal British Legion, and the members were selected from a pool of 1000 performers.

Their debut single The Call (No Need to Say Goodbye) debuted at number 13 on the UK Singles Chart and was written by Regina Spektor. The full album, No Need To Say Goodbye, entered the UK Album Chart at number 62 in its first week. In November 2013 the group performed in front of Queen Elizabeth II and Prime Minister David Cameron at the Festival of Remembrance.

== Members ==
- Megan Adams
- Florence Ransom
- Alice Milburn
- Bethany Davey
- Charlotte Mellor

== Discography ==
=== Albums ===
- No Need To Say Goodbye (2013)

=== Singles ===
- The Call (No Need to Say Goodbye) (25 November 2013)
