= London Poppy Day =

UK charity event of the Royal British Legion

- Date: First Thursday of November
- Frequency: Annual
- Location: London
- Years active: 2006–present
- Organizer: Royal British Legion
- Website: www.britishlegion.org.uk/get-involved/things-to-do/regional-events

London Poppy Day is an annual event organised by the Royal British Legion which aims to raise £1million for its Poppy Appeal. Launched in 2006, the event takes place in London on the first Thursday of November, shortly before the United Kingdom observes Remembrance Sunday, and is one of several similar events held in cities around the United Kingdom. The day sees volunteers and armed forces veterans selling poppy merchandise to raise funds at venues such as railway stations, on the London Underground, and in offices, as well as entertainment provided by military bands.

== Overview ==
London Poppy Day is an annual event organised by the Royal British Legion that takes place on the first Thursday of November, shortly before Remembrance Sunday, and aims to raise £1m for the Royal British Legion's Poppy Appeal. The event sees volunteers selling poppy merchandise at venues around London, including rail and tube stations during the morning and evening rush hours, as well as offices at lunchtime to raise funds for the Royal British Legion's Poppy Appeal. Entertainment is provided throughout the day by military bands, with the 2010 event, held on 4 November of that year, including a performance by the Band of the Brigade of Gurkhas at Leadenhall Market, and military bagpipes at various underground stations, while Poppy Day 2017 included a performance by the Band of the Grenadier Guards at London Waterloo station. The day ends with the volunteers gathering at Leadenhall Market.

Similar events are held in other locations around the UK in early November, including Birmingham, Cardiff, Edinburgh, Leeds, and Manchester.

== History ==
The first London Poppy Day took place in November 2006, and was organised by 10 volunteers from the Royal British Legion's Lloyd's of London Branch, who raised £500 for the Poppy Appeal. It has since grown into the largest street collection of its kind in Europe. In 2008, the collection raised £16,000. A total of £60,000 was raised in 2009, while the 2010 collection aimed to raise £150,000 with volunteers selling poppies at around 30 venues. The 2013 London Poppy Day, held on 7 November, was launched by The Poppy Girls, who performed their single, "The Call (No Need to Say Goodbye)", at Covent Garden, while volunteers at around 80 venues hoped to raise £1m for the Poppy Appeal. The then Duke and Duchess of Cambridge travelled by bus to Kensington High Street to meet volunteers and help sell poppies. Prince Philip, Duke of Edinburgh also opened the Field of Remembrance, a memorial garden at Westminster. Poppy Day 2014 saw special announcements recorded for the London Underground by footballer John Terry and Arsenal manager Arsène Wenger. In 2017, Gavin Williamson, the newly-appointed Secretary of State for Defence, joined volunteers to sell poppies at Waterloo station.

London Poppy Day went ahead in November 2020, but on a much reduced scale because of restrictions introduced as a result of the COVID-19 pandemic, with ways to donate including via QR code, text messaging and contactless payment in order to facilitate the need for social distancing measures to be observed. That year saw 200 volunteers collecting at nine railway stations in London, and included personnel from 32 Regiment Royal Artillery, who were part of the UK's response to the pandemic. The 2021 event, held on 4 November, saw collections at around 50 London Underground stations and around 3,000 volunteers taking part across London.

In October 2022, and following the announcement of a series of strikes by the National Union of Rail, Maritime and Transport Workers (RMT), the Royal British Legion cancelled that year's London Poppy Day, scheduled for 3 November, a day on which one of the strikes would fall. The Royal British Legion said it would look at alternative ways to "lessen the impact" of the financial loss cancelling the event would cause. The RMT subsequently cancelled the 3 November strike to avoid the event. It was the second time a planned railway strike had been called off for the event, following a 72-hour strike scheduled by staff at Southern Trains for 3–5 November 2016 that would have coincided with Thursday 3 November of that year, and was suspended for the day following a request from the Royal British Legion.

The 2022 event saw around 2,000 volunteers collecting donations around London. To mark its tenth year of supporting the Royal British Legion, Transport for London designed special poppy roundels that were displayed at around 20 underground stations, including King's Cross St Pancras, Baker Street and London Bridge, while some London buses were wrapped in displays designed for the occasion. A special train announcement was also recorded by the actor Shane Richie. Rishi Sunak, the UK Prime Minister, also helped to sell poppies at Westminster tube station. In November 2023, Veterans' Minister Johnny Mercer joined volunteers to sell poppies to the public, while musician Jools Holland recorded announcements for the London Underground encouraging people to donate to the Poppy Appeal.
