= Tony Bianchi =

British writer (1952–2017)

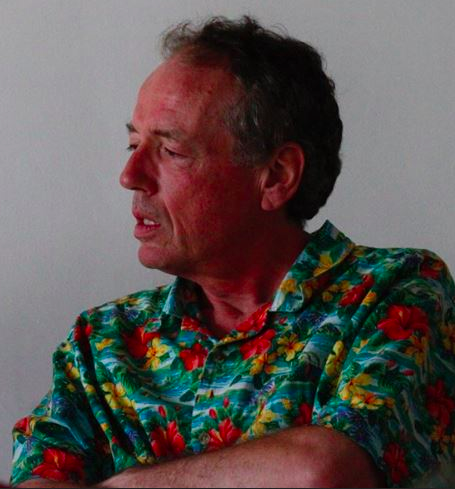
Tony at Hay on Wye literature Festival 2016

Tony Bianchi (5 April 1952 – 2 July 2017) was a prize-winning novelist, poet, short-story writer and critic, writing in both Welsh and English.

== Early life ==
Tony Bianchi was born in North Shields, near Newcastle-upon-Tyne. His father was a policeman of Italian ancestry. He attended a Catholic school on Tyneside, then studied English & Philosophy at St David's University College in Lampeter, Wales.

Bianchi obtained a doctoral degree with a thesis on Samuel Beckett. While studying in Wales, he met his future wife, Diana, who was an activist Welsh speaker, and who instilled a passion for the language in him. They had two daughters, Rhiannon and Heledd, named after early Welsh literary figures.

== Career ==
Bianchi's first job was as a teacher of English in Flintshire and Aberystwyth. He then became Literature Officer (and subsequently Literature Director) at the Welsh Arts Council in Cardiff - an organisation that provided him with material for his first novel Esgyrn Bach. Bianchi's literary life took off after his retirement from the Arts Council in 2002. He became a prolific novelist as well as a skillful poet, well-versed in the intricacies of the strict metres of Welsh poetry and winning numerous prizes and plaudits. He lived in Cardiff with his partner Ruth until his death in 2017 aged 65. He was an avid supporter of Newcastle United; an excellent pianist; a frequent (bilingual) contributor to debates in the Conway pub about beer, politics, language, history, music, football, philosophy, random irritants, and the tendency of people to leave doors open; a valued member of the local Twlc at Y Mochyn Du; and a fan of both the coffee and the company at Caban bookshop.

=== Writings in Welsh ===
His first novel, Esgyrn Bach came out in 2006, and his second Pryfeta in 2009. Pryfeta won the Daniel Owen Memorial Prize at the National Eisteddfod.

His collection of short stories, Cyffesion Geordi oddi Cartref (2011), was semi-autobiographical, introducing the friends of his youth, and describing the bullying he faced at school, as well as his mixed feelings towards his tyrannical father. Some stories were fantasies and were met with bafflement on the part of Welsh language readers on account of their technical complexity.

His novel Dwy Farwolaeth Endaf Rowlands won the Prose Medal at the National Eisteddfod in 2015, sealing his fame as a superb exponent of Welsh language in the 21st century. The book delves into the thoughts of Tomos Rowlands who is obsessed with sounds and tries to make sense of his life through them.

Bianchi won the Micro-fiction Prize at the 2017 Anglesey Eisteddfod. A collection of his Welsh-language poetry and micro-fiction, Rhwng Pladur A Blaguryn (Between the Scythe and the Green Shoot), will be published by Barddas in August 2018. The title is taken from one of the poems:

Rhwng pladur a blaguryn – rhwng afal
a’r anghofio sydyn:
rhwng y gwaed a’r angau gwyn;
o wynfa I bla: trwch blewyn.

=== Writings in English ===
Bumping, which came out in 2010, was Bianchi's only English-language novel, and narrated themes of home, vicissitudes of youth and the delusions of old age. A posthumous collection of short stories Staring Back at Me was published by Cinnamon Press in May 2018.

Bianchi also translated several of his works into English: Pryfeta (Daniel's Beetles), Ras Olaf Harri Selwyn (Harri Selwyn’s Last Race), Esgyrn Bach (The Bone Pickers).

=== Academic writings ===
Besides his literary works, Bianchi also contributed to the academy with a monograph on Richard Vaughan as well an anthology of Welsh poetry titled Blodeugerdd Barddas o Farddoniaeth Gyfoes (2005).

Bianchi was made a Fellow of the Welsh Academy of Writers.

== Selected works ==
=== Welsh ===
- Bianchi, Tony (2006). Esgyrn Bach. Y Lolfa. ISBN 9780862438623.
- Bianchi, Tony (2007). Pryfeta. Y Lolfa. ISBN 9780862439996.
- Bianchi, Tony (2009). Chwilio am Sebastian Pierce. Gomer. ISBN 9781843239901.
- Bianchi, Tony (2011). Cyffesion Geordie oddi Cartref. Gomer Press. ISBN 978-1848512085.
- Bianchi, Tony (2012). Ras Olaf Harri Selwyn. Gomer. ISBN 9781848513631.
- Bianchi, Tony (2015). Dwy Farwolaeth Endaf Rowlands. Gomer. ISBN 9781785620287.
- Bianchi, Tony (2016). Sol a Lara. Gomer. ISBN 9781848518018.

=== English ===
- Bianchi, Tony (2010). Bumping. Alcemi. ISBN 9780955527289.
- Harry Selwyn's Last Race 2012 ISBN 9781910409695
- Staring Back at Me. 2018 ISBN 9781788640107
