= Alice Baker (veteran) =

Long-lived World War I veteran (1898–2006)

- Baker, centre, during World War I
- Born: 28 July 1898; Costessey, Norfolk, England
- Died: 2 March 2006 (aged 107); Hallows Hospital, Ditchingham, Norfolk, England
- Military career
- Allegiance: United Kingdom
- Conflicts: World War I

Alice Baker (28 July 1898 – 2 March 2006) was a British World War I service veteran. She was one of the last known female British World War I veterans in the UK. Her non-combat service was as a Leading Aircraftswoman in the Royal Flying Corps at the age of 18 as a 'doper' waterproofing aircraft wings.

== Biography ==
She was born in 1898 in Costessey, near Norwich in England. After the war, she became a nurse at Saint Andrew's hospital in Thorpe. She married a police officer named Stanley. They had a son, Leslie, who was a pilot during World War II. He served in the RAF and as a bomber pilot. At the age of 94, she was invited for the 75th anniversary of the RAF, and stood next to Queen Elizabeth II. On Alice's 100th and 107th birthdays, RAF Coltishall pilots did commemorative flypasts in her honour. She lived with her family in Hempnall until she was 104, then moved to a care home in Ditchingham. Alice Baker died in her sleep at the age of 107 on 2 March 2006.
