= Iain Macmillan =

Scottish photographer (1938–2006)

- Born: Iain Stewart Macmillan; 20 October 1938; Dundee, Scotland, UK
- Died: 8 May 2006 (aged 67); Dundee, Scotland, UK
- Occupation: Photographer
- Years active: 1958−1993
- Known for: Photographed Abbey Road and famous photograph of John Lennon

Iain Stewart Macmillan (20 October 1938 – 8 May 2006) was the Scottish photographer famous for taking the cover photograph for the Beatles' album Abbey Road in 1969. He grew up in Scotland, then moved to London to become a professional photographer. He used a photo of Yoko Ono in a book that he published in 1966, and Ono invited him to photograph her exhibit at Indica Gallery. She introduced him to John Lennon, and Lennon invited him to photograph the cover for Abbey Road. He worked with Lennon and Ono for several years, staying for a while at their home in New York.

== Early years ==
Macmillan was born in Dundee, Scotland. He attended the High School of Dundee and graduated in 1954. He worked as a trainee manager at a jute mill.

== 1958–1966 ==
He moved to London in 1958 to study Photography at the Regent Street Polytechnic. His first work was as a cruise photographer. He returned to Dundee in 1959 to photograph street scenes. From this work The Sunday Times and the Illustrated London News commissioned him in the early 1960s. In the mid-1960s he worked on an exhibition catalogue for "The Sculpture of David Wynne". He also photographed "The Book of London" (1966), Yoko appears on page 181 presenting a demonstration of "Handkerchief Piece". The photo shows Yoko and three others wearing handkerchiefs tied over their mouths. She commissioned him to photograph her exhibit at the Indica Gallery in St. James's, London.

== 1966–1971 ==
Lennon met Ono at the Indica Gallery on 9 November 1966, and she later introduced him to Macmillan. In 1969, Lennon invited him to photograph the Abbey Road cover. The Beatles recorded most of their music at the EMI Studios on Abbey Road, St John's Wood, London, and they decided to name their last album after the road. Later EMI changed the name of the studio to the Abbey Road Studios.

Paul McCartney gave Macmillan a sketch a couple days before the shoot showing where and what the picture should look like. Macmillan added his own sketch in the top corner to confirm the layout. On 8 August 1969, around 11:30 am, Macmillan climbed up a stepladder about 10 feet in the air in the middle of Abbey Road and took six pictures of the Beatles crossing the street. A policeman was hired to control traffic. The Beatles usually came to the studio around 2–3 pm, so the earlier hour was chosen to avoid fans.

First Photo: John leads the group from left to right followed by Ringo, Paul, and George. They kept this order throughout all the photos. There is a Mercedes pulling out of the studio behind them. John is looking away from the camera and Paul and George are in mid step. Paul is wearing sandals.
Second Photo: They walk back in the same order. Good spacing but only John has a full step.
Third Photo: Left to right again, full steps this time but they are all too far left. There is now a traffic backup. There are a taxi, two vans, and a double-decker bus waiting to come forward. Paul is now barefoot.
Fourth Photo: Walking right to left, Paul, Ringo, and George all in mid-step. The traffic has gone through but the bus has stopped to watch.
Fifth Photo: This photo was used for the cover of the album and is the only photo where we see Paul smoking and the only one with their legs in perfect formation. The three men on the left above Paul's head are Alan Flanagan, Steve Millwood, and Derek Seagrove. They were interior decorators returning from a lunch break. On the right side between John and Ringo's head is Paul Cole, an American tourist.
Sixth Photo: Ringo is slightly too far behind John. The bus has turned around to leave.
After the shoot, Macmillan went to find a road sign for use on the back cover. It was taken on the corner with Alexandra Road. During photographing the sign, a girl in a blue dress walked through the shot. Iain was angry but later it was chosen as the back cover. The wall with the sign was demolished several years later.

Macmillan worked for Lennon and Ono until 1971, doing such work as:

- The cloud on the album cover for Live Peace in Toronto
- Photos on the album Some Time in New York City
- The wedding cake in the Wedding Album
- Ono's book Flies
- The cover photo on Ono's book Grapefruit
- The merging heads label of Lennon and Ono's vinyl single "Happy Xmas (War is Over)"
- The merging heads label of Lennon and Ono's album Some Time in New York City
- Kenny Rogers and the First Edition – cover photograph of Something's Burning, 1970.

== After 1971 ==
In the 1970s, Macmillan taught photography part-time at college in Stoke-on-Trent. In 1980 he took the cover photo for the album Hinge and Bracket at Abbey Road which was a parody of the Beatles photo. In the 1980s, his work was on exhibit in the US, Britain and Europe. The BBC used some of his photos in the series The Rock 'n' Roll Years. After the death of his mother, Macmillan moved back to Carnoustie, Scotland. On 22 July 1993, he photographed Paul McCartney at Abbey Road on the zebra crossing, this time with only an Old English Sheepdog. The shot was used on the cover of Paul Is Live album.

On 8 May 2006, at the age of 67, Macmillan died of lung cancer.

== Books by or with ==
- The Sculpture of David Wynne, 1949–1967 by T. S. R. Boase (author), Iain Macmillan (photographer)
- The Book of London by Iain Stewart Macmillan
- The Young Meteors: an Inside Report on the Rising Stars of London in Fashion, Entertainment, Modeling, Art, Politics, Journalism by Johnathan Aitken (Author), Iain Macmillan (Illustrator)
- Civil Aviation by Iain Macmillan & Dudley Foy
- The Death of the English Pub by Christopher Hutt

== Sources ==
- Grapefruit: A Book of Instructions and Drawings by Yoko Ono
- The Beatles: The Biography by Bob Spitz
- Abbey Road by Brian Southall
- The Ultimate Beatles Encyclopedia by Bill Harry
- The Beatles Off the Record by Keith Badman
- The Beatles After the Breakup 1970–2000 by Keith Badman

== External sources ==
- The Guardian "Eyewitness" 1989
- The Guardian 2006
- Photo outtakes
- Photo Six in the series of Abbey Road cover shots
