= Tom Weir =

Scottish climber, author, and broadcaster (1914–2006)

- Born: Thomas Weir; 29 December 1914; Springburn, Glasgow, Scotland
- Died: 6 July 2006 (aged 91); West Dunbartonshire, Scotland
- Occupations: Climber, author, broadcaster
- Known for: Weir's Way

Thomas Weir MBE (29 December 1914 – 6 July 2006) was a Scottish climber, author and broadcaster. He was best known for his long-running television series Weir's Way.

== Early life and career ==
Weir was born in Springburn, Glasgow, and the younger brother of the actress Molly Weir. After service in the Royal Artillery during World War II, he worked as a surveyor for the Ordnance Survey, before commencing a full-time career as a climber, writer and photographer.

In 1950 he was a member of the first post-war Himalayan expedition and, in 1952, was one of the first to explore the previously closed mountain ranges of Nepal, east of Kathmandu.

== Media career and later life ==
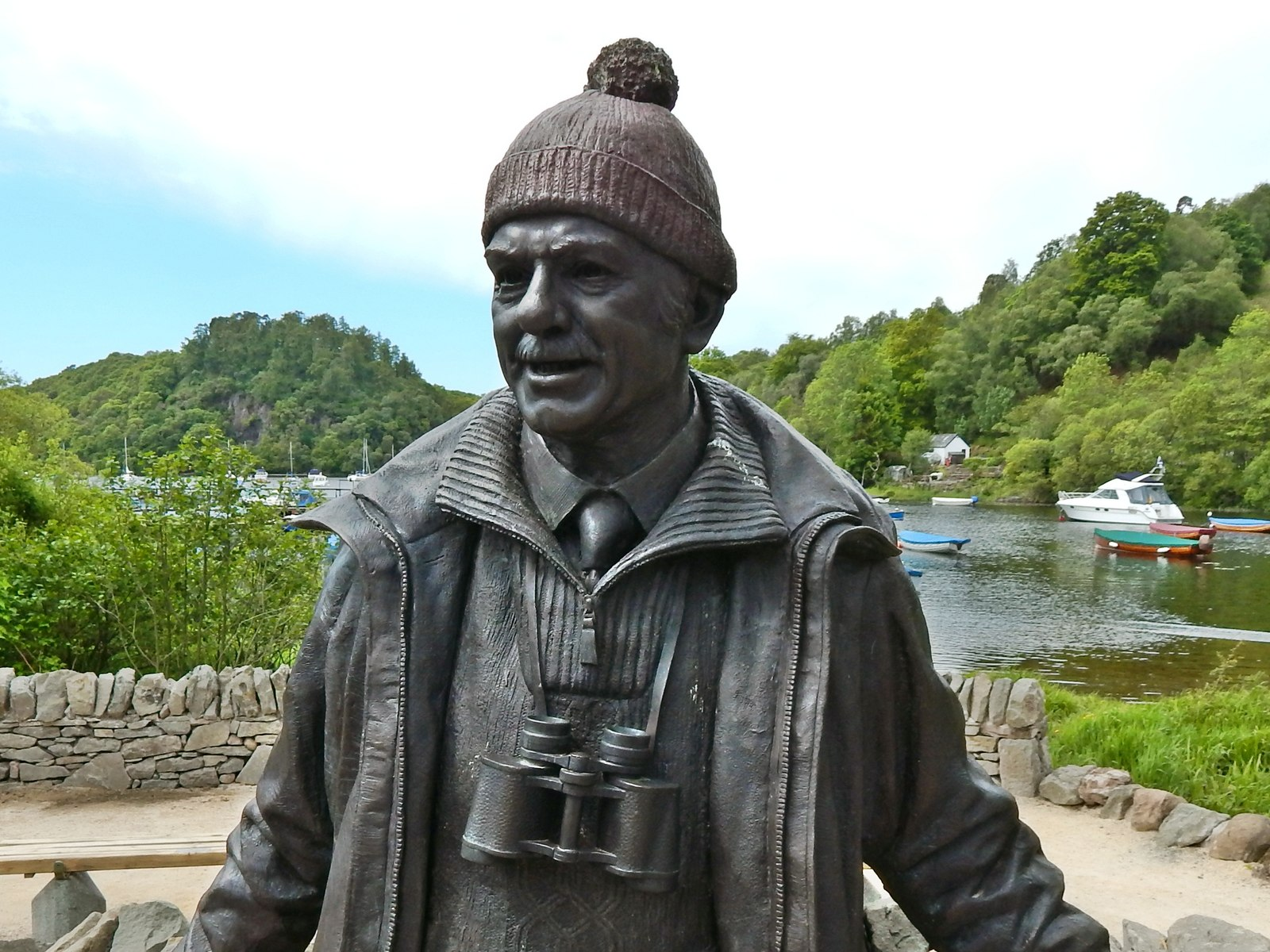
A statue of Tom Weir was unveiled on the eastern shore of Loch Lomond in 2014.

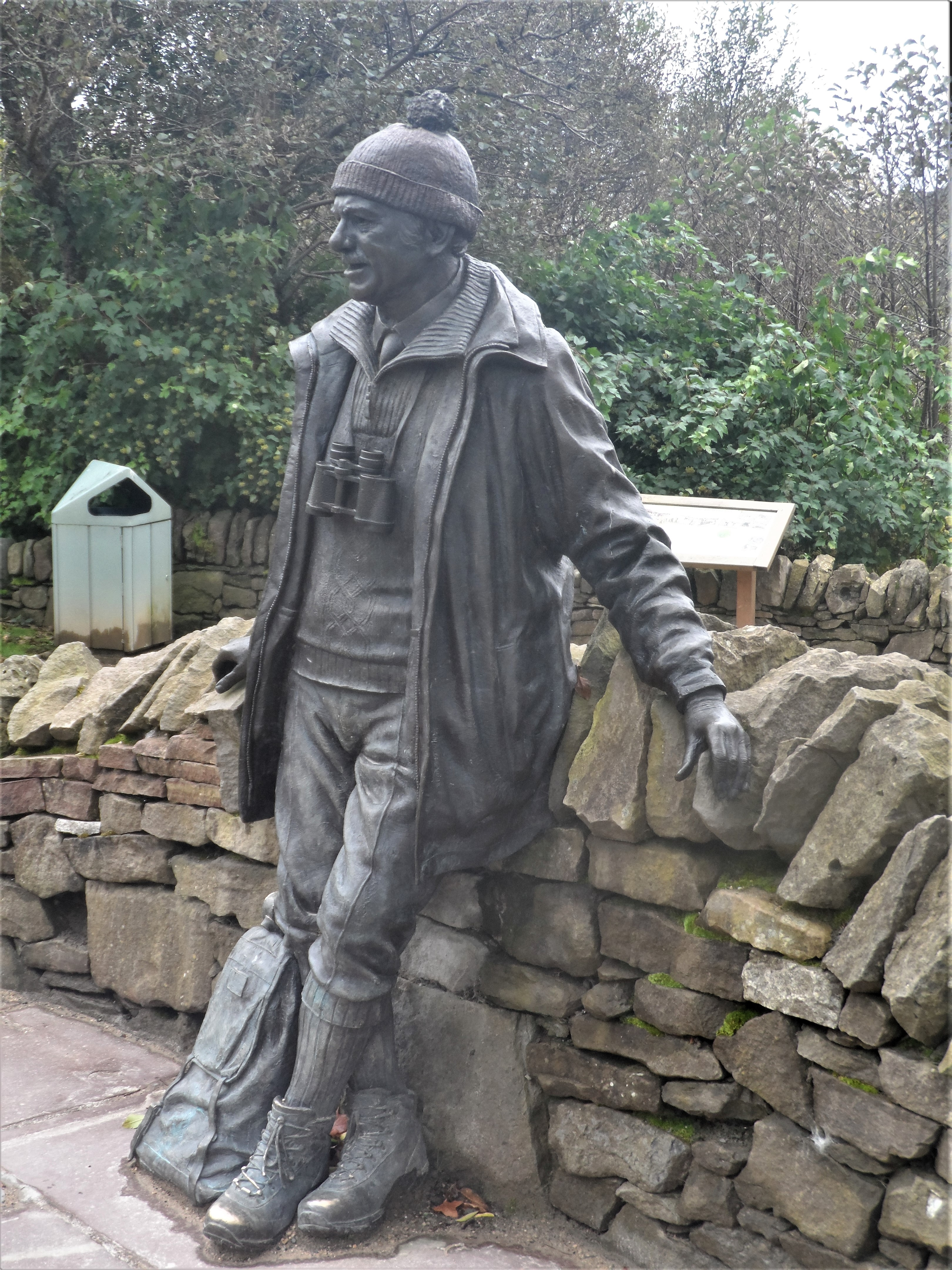
Another view of the statue

Weir became a pioneering campaigner for the protection of the Scottish environment, and wrote a column for The Scots Magazine for over 50 years. From 1976–1987, he hosted the Scottish Television series Weir's Way, meeting the people of Scotland, exploring the landscape and its natural history. When STV repeated the series during the late night slot from the mid-1990s to the early 2000s it managed to achieve 30% audience share. The series is available on DVD in the UK.

Weir won the Scottish Television 'Personality of the Year Award' in 1976. He was appointed MBE in 1976. He lived in Gartocharn and in 2000 he was awarded the inaugural John Muir Lifetime Achievement Award by the John Muir Trust in recognition of his environmental work. He is also celebrated in the song "Tom Weir" written by Edinburgh musician Sandy Wright and performed by the band Aberfeldy. And in 2007, L. Pierre wrote an ambient instrumental song, "Weir's Way", featured on his album, "Dip".

Weir was buried on 17 July 2006 in Kilmaronock Parish Church, near Drymen, in the same plot as the ashes of his sister Molly.

== DVD release ==
A collection of some of Weir's best walks was released on DVD in 2006. Both series of Weir's Way are available on DVD, distributed by Acorn Media UK.
