= 1931 in Northern Ireland =

- Centuries: 20th; 21st
- Decades: 1920s; 1930s; 1940s; 1950s
- See also: 1931 in the United Kingdom; 1931 in Ireland; Other events of 1931; List of years in Northern Ireland

Events during the year 1931 in Northern Ireland.

== Incumbents ==
- Governor - The Duke of Abercorn
- Prime Minister - James Craig

== Events ==
- 9 January – Ulster Canal abandoned.
- Ulster Protestant League established.

== Sport ==
=== Football ===
- The Northern Ireland international soccer team change the colour of their shirt from blue to green.
- Irish League

Winners: Glentoran

- Irish Cup

Winners: Linfield 3 - 0 Ballymena United

== Births ==
- 24 January – Charles Harding Smith, loyalist paramilitary (died 1997).
- 15 February – John Erritt, deputy director of the British Government Statistical Service (died 2002).
- 18 February – Peter Scott, né Gulston, burglar (died 2013 in London).
- 8 April – Paddie Bell, folk singer (died 2005).
- 9 April – Patrick Walsh, Bishop of Down & Connor (1991–2008) (died 2023).
- 15 April – Sir Kenneth Bloomfield, head of the Northern Ireland Civil Service and member of the Northern Ireland Victims Commission and the Independent Commission for the Location of Victims' Remains.
- 25 April – James Fenton, Ulster Scots poet (died 2021).
- 15 June – Martin Smyth, Unionist politician and minister of the Presbyterian Church in Ireland (died 2025).
- 28 June – John Morrow, Presbyterian minister and peace activist (died 2009).
- 29 June – Brian Hutton, Baron Hutton, Law Lord (died 2020).
- 4 July – Stephen Boyd, actor (died 1977).
- 5 August – Billy Bingham, international footballer and manager (died 2022).
- 25 October – Jimmy McIlroy, international footballer (died 2018).
- 2 November – Eileen Paisley, Baroness Paisley of St George's, Democratic Unionist Party politician and life peer.
- 31 December – Bob Shaw, science fiction novelist (died 1996).

== See also ==
- 1931 in Scotland
- 1931 in Wales
