= 1935 in Northern Ireland =

- Centuries: 20th; 21st
- Decades: 1920s; 1930s; 1940s; 1950s
- See also: 1935 in the United Kingdom; 1935 in Ireland; Other events of 1935; List of years in Northern Ireland

Events during the year 1935 in Northern Ireland.

== Incumbents ==
- Governor - The Duke of Abercorn
- Prime Minister - James Craig

== Events ==
- 1 April – The National Athletics and Cycling Association is suspended from the International Amateur Athletic Federation for refusing to confine its activities to the Free State side of the border.
- 18 June – Ministry of Home Affairs bans all parades from this date, but lifts it for 12 July parades.
- 12 July – Rioting breaks out in Belfast following Orange Order parades. By 21 July nine people have been shot dead and scores injured. Rioting continues to the end of August, by which time eight Protestants and five Catholics have been killed, hundreds injured and over 2,000 homes destroyed (almost all Catholic).
- 26 October – Lord Edward Carson, the Dublin-born unionist leader and barrister, is buried in St Anne's Cathedral, Belfast.
- 14 November – United Kingdom general election.

== Arts and literature ==
- September – Louis MacNeice publishes his Poems.
- 7 December – The Strand Cinema is opened in Belfast.

== Sport ==
=== Football ===
- Irish League

Winners: Linfield

- Irish Cup

Winners: Glentoran 1 - 0 Larne

=== Golf ===
- British Ladies Amateur Golf Championship is held at Royal County Down Golf Club, (winner: Wanda Morgan).

== Births ==
- 3 February – Alexander McDonnell, 9th Earl of Antrim.
- 29 March – Ruby Murray, singer (died 1996).
- 9 May – Rev. John Coey Smyth, President of Elim Pentecostal Church (died 2020).
- 21 April – Robin Dixon, 3rd Baron Glentoran, bobsledder and politician.
- 22 June – Walter Love, broadcaster (died 2024).
- 11 July – Oliver Napier, first leader of the Alliance Party.
- 27 July – Billy McCullough, international soccer player.
- 30 September – James McKendry, artist.
- 3 October – Jimmy Hill, soccer player and manager.
- 9 October – Billy Bell, Ulster Unionist Party Lord Mayor of Belfast and also of Lisburn.
- 21 October – Derek Bell, harpist and composer (died 2002).
- Full date unknown – Mary Nelis, Sinn Féin MLA.

== Deaths ==
- 17 July – George William Russell, critic, poet and artist (born 1867).
- 22 July – William Mulholland, water service engineer in Southern California (born 1855).
- 9 August – James Buchanan, 1st Baron Woolavington, businessman and philanthropist (born 1849).
- 23 August – Charles Rafter, Chief Constable of Birmingham City Police from 1899 to 1935 (b. c1860).
- 22 October – Edward Carson, Irish Unionist leader, barrister and judge (born 1854).

== See also ==
- 1935 in Scotland
- 1935 in Wales
