= 1922 in Northern Ireland =

- Centuries: 20th; 21st
- Decades: 1920s; 1930s; 1940s
- See also: 1922 in the United Kingdom; 1922 in Ireland; Other events of 1922; List of years in Northern Ireland

Events during the year 1922 in Northern Ireland.

== Incumbents ==
- Lord Lieutenant of Ireland - The Viscount FitzAlan of Derwent (until 6 December)
- Governor - The Duke of Abercorn (from 12 December)
- Prime Minister - James Craig

== Events ==
- January–March - Two "Craig–Collins Pacts" fail to resolve sectarian differences between North and South.
- 6 January - The terms of the Anglo-Irish Treaty are published. Éamon de Valera offers his resignation as President of the Irish Republic.
- 7 January - Dáil Éireann votes on the Treaty following Arthur Griffith's motion for approval. The result is 64 in favour and 57 against.
- 10 February - The Treaty Bill is introduced in the British House of Commons. It provides for the dissolution of the Parliament of Southern Ireland and the election of a parliament to which the Provisional Government will be responsible.
- 24 March - McMahon killings: Five men, four wearing police uniforms, shoot all eight men in a Belfast Catholic household, killing six, in a reprisal attack for the previous killing of police officers.
- 1 April - Arnon Street killings: Members of the police force murder six Belfast Catholic civilians in a revenge attack for the previous killing of a police officer.
- 7 April - Civil Authorities (Special Powers) Act (Northern Ireland) 1922 is passed.
- 19 May - The Irish Republican Army, with the covert support of Michael Collins, attempts to launch a "Northern Offensive" in Ulster.
- 1 June - Official founding of the Royal Ulster Constabulary.
- 4 June - The British Army recaptures Belleek, County Fermanagh, from the Irish Republican Army.
- 18 September - W. T. Cosgrave introduces the Constitution of Saorstát Éireann Bill to enable the implementation of the Treaty between Great Britain and Ireland.
- 5 December - UK Parliament enacts the Irish Free State Constitution Act, by which it legally sanctions the new Constitution of the Irish Free State.
- 6 December - Twelve months after the signing of the Treaty the Irish Free State officially comes into existence.
- 12 December - The Duke of Abercorn becomes first Governor of Northern Ireland, a post he will hold until 1945.

== Sport ==
=== Football ===
- International

4 March Scotland 2 - 1 Northern Ireland (in Glasgow)
1 April Northern Ireland 1 - 1 Wales (in Belfast)
21 October England 2 - 0 Northern Ireland (in West Bromwich)

- Irish League

Winners: Linfield

- Irish Cup

Winners: Linfield 2 - 0 Glenavon

=== Motorcycling ===
- 14 October - First Ulster Grand Prix motorcycle road race takes place on the Old Clady circuit.

== Births ==
- 13 February - Francis Pym, second Secretary of State for Northern Ireland.
- 13 March - David Graham, cricketer.
- 31 March - Patrick Magee, actor (died 1982).
- 12 April - Billy McComb, magician and comedian (died 2006).
- 19 May - Joe Gilmore, barman (Savoy Hotel's American Bar) (died 2015)
- 12 August - Humphrey Atkins, fifth Secretary of State for Northern Ireland (died 1996).
- 24 November - Joan Turner, singer and comedian (died 2009).
- 25 November - Brian McConnell, Baron McConnell, Ulster Unionist MP in the Northern Ireland House of Commons and Minister (died 2000).

== Deaths ==
- 3 February - John Butler Yeats, artist and father of W. B. Yeats and Jack Butler Yeats (born 1839).
- 22 May - William Twaddell, Ulster Unionist Party MP, assassinated by Irish Republican Army (born 1884).
- 8 December - Joe McKelvey, Irish Republican Army officer executed during the Irish Civil War.

== See also ==
- The Troubles in Northern Ireland (1920–1922)
- 1922 in Scotland
- 1922 in Wales
