= 1928 in Northern Ireland =

- Centuries: 20th; 21st
- Decades: 1920s; 1930s; 1940s
- See also: 1928 in the United Kingdom; 1928 in Ireland; Other events of 1928; List of years in Northern Ireland

Events during the year 1928 in Northern Ireland.

== Incumbents ==
- Governor - The Duke of Abercorn
- Prime Minister - James Craig

== Events ==
- 29 January – In Belfast, members of the nationalist opposition protest at the Ulster Unionist Party government's plan to abolish the single transferable vote.
- 19 May – The foundation stone of the new Northern Ireland Parliament Building is laid at Stormont.
- 28 June – The keel of the first 1000 ft (300 m)-long ocean liner, Oceanic, for the White Star Line, is laid by Harland and Wolff in Belfast; construction is delayed, and will be cancelled in 1929.
- The struggling Clogher Valley Railway is taken over by a committee of management appointed by Tyrone and Fermanagh County Councils.
- Work starts on building the Royal Courts of Justice, Belfast, completed in 1933.
- Irish Linen Guild established.

== Sport ==
=== Football ===
- International

4 February Northern Ireland 1 - 2 Wales
25 February Scotland 0 - 1 Northern Ireland (in Glasgow)
22 October England 2 - 1 Northern Ireland (in Liverpool)

- Irish League

Winners: Belfast Celtic

- Irish Cup

Winners: Willowfield 1 - 0 Larne

- Derry City are founded, entering the Irish League the following year.
- 7 April – Ballymena United F.C. are founded as Ballymena Football Club.

== Births ==
- 19 February – Sam Cree, playwright (died 1980).
- 7 April – James White, science fiction novelist (died 1999).
- 18 April (in London) – Anne Dickson, Unionist Party of Northern Ireland MP.
- 17 June – Basil McIvor, Ulster Unionist politician (died 2004)
- 28 June – John Stewart Bell, physicist and originator of Bell's Theorem (died 1990).
- 25 July – Jimmy Jones, footballer (died 2014)
- 5 October – David Hammond, singer, filmmaker and broadcaster (died 2008).
- 30 October – Charles Brett, lawyer, journalist, author and founding member of the Ulster Architectural Heritage Society (died 2005).
- 19 December – Eve Bunting, author (died 2023 in the United States).

== Deaths ==
- 19 November – Edward O'Neill, 2nd Baron O'Neill, politician (born 1839)

== See also ==
- 1928 in Scotland
- 1928 in Wales
