= 1925 in Northern Ireland =

- Centuries: 20th; 21st
- Decades: 1920s; 1930s; 1940s
- See also: 1925 in the United Kingdom; 1925 in Ireland; Other events of 1925; List of years in Northern Ireland

Events during the year 1925 in Northern Ireland.

== Incumbents ==
- Governor - The Duke of Abercorn
- Prime Minister - James Craig

== Events ==
- 10 March – The Prime Minister of Northern Ireland, James Craig, announces the impending dissolution of the parliament. He says the election will be fought on the Boundary Commission.
- 16 March – At a meeting of the Irish Boundary Commission in County Down witnesses from Newry and Kilkeel support being included in the Irish Free State.
- 2 June – Foundation stone for the west front of St Anne’s Cathedral, Belfast, is laid by Governor of Northern Ireland, the Duke of Abercorn.
- 7 November – The Morning Post, a Conservative London newspaper, publishes a leaked report of the Irish Boundary Commission's (limited) proposals for altering the border between the Free State and Northern Ireland, which are contrary to the Free State's view; publication effectively ends the work of the commission.
- 3 December – A settlement on the boundary question between the Irish Free State and Northern Ireland is presented in London. Controversially, there is no change to the border, in exchange for the Free State's liability for service of the U.K. public debt in respect of war pensions being dropped. The agreement is approved during this month by the U.K. and Free State legislatures.

== Sport ==
=== Football ===
- International

28 February Northern Ireland 0 - 3 Scotland
18 April Wales 0 - 0 Northern Ireland (in Wrexham)
24 October Northern Ireland 0 - 0 England

- Irish League

Winners: Glentoran

- Irish Cup

Winners: Distillery 2 - 1 Glentoran

== Births ==
- 23 January – James Bingham, artist. (died 2009)
- 20 February – Norman Miscampbell, British Conservative Party MP (died 2007).
- 5 March – George G. Hall, applied mathematician and scientist (died 2018).
- 8 March – Paddy Devlin, a founder of the SDLP, a member of the 1974 Power Sharing Executive and author. (died 1999).
- 23 April – Johnny McCauley, singer/songwriter. (died 2012)
- 17 October – Len Graham, footballer (died 2007).

== See also ==
- 1925 in Scotland
- 1925 in Wales
