= 2005 in Northern Ireland =

- Centuries: 20th; 21st
- Decades: 1980s; 1990s; 2000s; 2010s; 2020s
- See also: 2005 in the United Kingdom; 2005 in Ireland; Other events of 2005; List of years in Northern Ireland

The following details notable events from the year 2005 in Northern Ireland. Northern Ireland is a country of the United Kingdom in the north-east of the island of Ireland. Northern Ireland shares a border with the Republic of Ireland to the south and west.

== Incumbents ==
- First Minister - Suspended
- Deputy First Minister - Suspended
- Secretary of State - Paul Murphy (until 6 May), Peter Hain (from 6 May)

== Events ==
- 11 January – During a storm, a lorry was blown off the Foyle Bridge and fell 100ft onto mudflats, killing the driver.
- 30 January – Belfast man Robert McCartney was murdered outside a bar in the city by members of the Provisional IRA.
- 2 February – The Provisional IRA issued a statement to the Republican newspaper An Phoblacht, withdrawing from its commitment to the decommissioning of weapons and other deals related to the Northern Ireland peace process.
- 9 February – Prime Minister Tony Blair issued a public apology to the 11 members of the Conlon and McGuire families who were wrongly convicted for the Guildford and Woolwich IRA pub bombings of 1974 when seven people were killed. The surviving members of the families were released in 1989 when the scientific evidence against them was discredited.
- 17 February – Several people were detained by Gardaí for suspected activities in relation to the Northern Bank robbery in Belfast in December 2004. £2.3 million sterling was seized in County Cork.
- 3 March – Sinn Féin suspended seven members over their alleged involvement in the murder of Belfast man Robert McCartney, who was stabbed to death following a row in a Belfast bar on 30 January.
- 17 March – Saint Patrick's Day: The sisters and fiancée of murdered Belfast man Robert McCartney met United States President George W. Bush in the United States in their campaign for justice for the murder.
- 5 May – 2005 United Kingdom general election.
- 7 May – Ulster Unionist Party leader David Trimble resigned the leadership after losing his seat in the general election.
- May – The Police Service of Northern Ireland took delivery of its first helicopter, a Eurocopter EC 135.
- 23 June – The IRA apologised unreservedly to the family of 14-year-old Kathleen Feeney, whom it shot dead in Derry in November 1973. The IRA had previously blamed the British Army for the killing, and murdered a British soldier in retaliation.
- 28 July – The Provisional IRA ended its armed campaign and ordered all its units to dump arms. The organisation also ordered its members not to engage in any other activities of any kind.
- 2 August – The British Army began to dismantle the observation post on top of Divis Tower in Belfast.
- 7 September – At Windsor Park, Belfast, Northern Ireland beat England 1–0. It was the first time since 1927 that the team beat England at home.
- 10 September – 2005 Belfast riots
- 14 September – The Secretary of State for Northern Ireland, Peter Hain, announced that the government no longer recognised loyalist paramilitary group the Ulster Volunteer Force's ceasefire, due to the UVF's continuing feud with the Loyalist Volunteer Force, and recent violence against the police.
- September – Historical Enquiries Team, unit of the Police Service of Northern Ireland, was established to investigate the 3,269 unsolved murders committed during the Troubles (specifically between 1968 and 1998).
- 20–22 November – The Dalai Lama Tenzin Gyatso paid a three-day visit, his second to Northern Ireland, with meetings on the theme of The Spiritual Dimension of Peace. He visited the Corrymeela Community in Ballycastle, County Antrim, a peace and reconciliation centre, on the day of his arrival. He officially opened the headquarters of Mediation Northern Ireland in Belfast on the 21st, and attended the 2005 Way of Peace celebration in Saint Anne's Cathedral the next day. He last visited Northern Ireland in October 2000.
- 24 November – Abbas Boutrab became the first non-republican or loyalist to be convicted in the diplock courts of Northern Ireland. He was convicted of having information that could be used to bomb an airliner.
- 3 December – Parliament Buildings hosted the funeral service for George Best. Approximately 25,000 people gathered in the grounds, with thousands more lining the cortege route.
- 8 December – President Mary McAleese met Elizabeth II at Hillsborough Castle. It was the first time that the two heads of state met in Ireland.
- 19 December – The Civil Partnership Act 2004 came into force, granting same-sex couples similar legal rights to those of married heterosexuals. The first civil partnership in the United Kingdom under the normal application of the new rules was registered at Belfast City Hall between Shannon Sickles and Grainne Close.

== Arts and literature ==
- Nick Laird's poems To a Fault (January) and novel Utterly Monkey (May) were published.

== Sport ==
=== Football ===
- Football World Cup 2006 Qualification
  - England 4–0 Northern Ireland (26 March)
  - Poland 1–0 Northern Ireland (30 March)
  - Northern Ireland 2–0 Azerbaijan (3 September)
  - Northern Ireland 1–0 England (7 September)
  - Northern Ireland 2–3 Wales (8 October)
  - Austria 2–0 Northern Ireland (12 October)

Northern Ireland failed to qualify

- Other international matches
  - Northern Ireland 1–4 Germany (4 June)
  - Northern Ireland 1–1 Portugal (15 November)
- Setanta Cup

Winners: Linfield

- Irish League

Winners: Glentoran

- Irish Cup

Winners: Portadown 5–1 Larne

- The IFA celebrated its 125th anniversary.
- The UEFA under 19 European championship was hosted by Ireland, with the final won by France in Windsor Park on 29 July.
- There was an all-Irish clash in the first qualifying round of the UEFA Champions League. Shelbourne defeated Glentoran 6–2 on aggregate.

=== Gaelic games ===
- Christy Ring Cup Final
  - Westmeath 1–23 : 2–18 Down
- All-Ireland Senior Football Championship Final
  - Tyrone 1–16 : 2–10 Kerry

=== Ice hockey ===
- Belfast Giants ended the Elite Ice Hockey League season as runners-up to Coventry Blaze.

=== Motorcycling ===
- 8 February – Robert Dunlop was the first person to be elected to the Irish Motorcycle Hall of Fame, and came back out of retirement.

=== Rugby union ===
- RBS Six Nations Championship
  - Ireland 28–17 Italy
  - Ireland 40–13 Scotland
  - Ireland 19–13 England
  - Ireland 19–26 France
  - Ireland 20–32 Wales
- Autumn Internationals
  - Ireland 7–45 New Zealand
  - Ireland 14–30 Australia
  - Ireland 43–12 Romania

== Deaths ==
- 31 January – Robert McCartney, victim of murder allegedly carried out by members of the Provisional Irish Republican Army (born 1971).
- 28 April – Mickey Marley, street entertainer
- 13 August – Robbie Millar, chef and restaurateur (born 1967).
- 19 August – Mo Mowlam, 11th British Secretary of State for Northern Ireland (born 1949)
- 26 August – Gerry Fitt, founder of the Social Democratic and Labour Party (born 1926).
- 4 October – Jim Gray, former Ulster Defence Association leader in east Belfast (born 1958).
- 25 November – George Best, former Northern Ireland and Manchester United footballer (born 1946).
- 19 December – Charles Brett, lawyer, journalist, author and founding member of the Ulster Architectural Heritage Society (born 1928).

== See also ==
- 2005 in England
- 2005 in Scotland
- 2005 in Wales
