= 1923 in Northern Ireland =

- Centuries: 20th; 21st
- Decades: 1920s; 1930s; 1940s
- See also: 1923 in the United Kingdom; 1923 in Ireland; Other events of 1923; List of years in Northern Ireland

Events during the year 1923 in Northern Ireland.

== Incumbents ==
- Governor - The Duke of Abercorn
- Prime Minister - James Craig

== Events ==
- 1 April – The Provisional Government of Ireland establishes customs posts on the border with Northern Ireland.
- 28 May – The government releases two captured documents issued by the IRA on 24 May. The letters, signed by Éamon de Valera and Frank Aiken call for the dumping of arms and the ending of armed struggle. The Civil War is officially over.
- The Church of Ireland parish church of St. Anne in Enniskillen is raised to the dignity of the cathedral church of St. Macartin.

== Sport ==
=== Football ===
- International

3 March Northern Ireland 0 - 1 Scotland
14 April Wales 0 - 3 Northern Ireland (in Wrexham)
20 October Northern Ireland 2 - 1 England

- Irish League

Winners: Linfield

- Irish Cup

Winners: Linfield 2 - 0 Glentoran

- Belfast side Alton United of the Falls District League are shock winners of the Free State Cup beating Shelbourne 1–0 in the final at Dalymount Park. Clubs and leagues in nationalist areas of Northern Ireland had affiliated to the FA of the Irish Free State after the 1921 split from the Belfast-based Irish Football Association.
- Newry Town Football Club is founded.

== Births ==
- 24 January – Donald Murray, Lord Justice of Appeal of the Supreme Court of Northern Ireland.
- 1 February – Sir John Gorman, Ulster Unionist Party MLA for North Down.
- 12 February – James Chichester-Clark, Fifth Prime Minister of Northern Ireland (died 2002).
- 12 April – Barry Shaw, barrister, first Director of Public Prosecutions for Northern Ireland (died 2010)
- 24 May – Siobhán McKenna, actress (died 1986).
- 20 September – Geraldine Clinton Little, poet (died 1997).
- 3 November – Tomás Ó Fiaich, Cardinal Archbishop of Armagh and Primate of All Ireland 1978-1990 (died 1990)

=== Full date unknown ===
- F. S. L. Lyons, historian (died 1983).
- Sean McAloon, Uilleann piper and pipe maker (died 1998).

== See also ==
- 1923 in Scotland
- 1923 in Wales
