= 2004 in Northern Ireland =

- Centuries: 20th; 21st
- Decades: 1980s; 1990s; 2000s; 2010s; 2020s
- See also: 2004 in the United Kingdom; 2004 in Ireland; Other events of 2004; List of years in Northern Ireland

Events during the year 2004 in Northern Ireland.

== Incumbents ==
- First Minister - Suspended
- Deputy First Minister - Suspended
- Secretary of State - Paul Murphy

== Events ==
- 27 March - Ireland's rugby team wins the Triple Crown for the first time since 1985.
- 27 March - David Trimble retains leadership of the Ulster Unionist Party at their annual general meeting.
- 30 June - Northern Ireland population estimated to be 1,710,300, a 4.1% increase over the 1994 figure.
- 14 September - Belfast-born Mary McAleese announces her intention to run for a second term as President of Ireland in the Republic.
- 30 September - The leader of the Democratic Unionist Party (DUP), Ian Paisley, makes an historic first visit to Dublin for political talks with the Taoiseach Bertie Ahern.
- 1 October - As nominations for candidates close, Mary McAleese is re-elected unopposed for a second term as President of Ireland.
- 11 November - Mary McAleese is inaugurated for a second term as President of Ireland.
- 8 December - Negotiated proposals to restore the power-sharing institutions to Northern Ireland by March fail to reach finality. The main sticking point is a refusal by the Provisional Irish Republican Army to allow photographs be taken of arms decommissioning and a refusal by the DUP's Ian Paisley to witness disarmament himself.
- 20 December - Northern Bank robbery: A gang of thieves steal £26.5 million worth of currency from Northern Bank's Donegall Square West headquarters in Belfast, one of the largest bank robberies in British history; no-one is ever found directly responsible for the crime.

== Arts and literature ==
- Seamus Heaney publishes a version of Sophocles' Antigone, entitled The Burial at Thebes.
- Seamus Heaney composes a poem called Beacons of Bealtaine for the 2004 EU Enlargement and reads it at a ceremony for the 25 leaders of the enlarged European Union arranged by the Irish EU presidency.
- Eoin McNamee publishes his novel The Ultras.
- David Park publishes his novel Swallowing the Sun.

== Sport ==
=== Football ===
- Football World Cup 2006 Qualification
  - Northern Ireland 0 - 3 Poland (4 September)
  - Wales 2 - 2 Northern Ireland (8 September)
  - Azerbaijan 0 - 0 Northern Ireland (9 October)
  - Northern Ireland 3-3 Austria (13 October)
- Irish League

Winners: Linfield

- Irish Cup

Winners: Glentoran 1 - 0 Coleraine

- The Irish Football Association takes over control of the remaining divisions run by Irish Football League, renaming them the IFA Intermediate League First and Second Divisions, effectively winding up the Irish Football League as a separate organisation after 114 years.

=== GAA ===
- 11 July - Armagh defeat Donegal 3-15 to 1-11 to win the Ulster Senior Football Championship.

=== Golf ===
- Ryder Cup
  - Three Irishmen, Pádraig Harrington, Darren Clarke and Paul McGinley, feature prominently on the victorious European team.
- Graeme McDowell wins the Telecom Italia Open.

=== Motorcycling ===
- Robert Dunlop retires at the Isle of Man TT.

=== Rugby Union ===
- Rugby Union Six Nations Championship
- Ireland win the Triple Crown for the first time since 1985. The team also becomes the first to beat England since their World Cup win. The results in full are as follows:
  - Ireland 19-3 Italy
  - Ireland 37-16 Scotland
  - Ireland 19-13 England
  - Ireland 17-35 France
  - Ireland 36-15 Wales

== Births ==
- Brodie Spencer
- Darren Robinson (footballer)

== Deaths ==
- 11 January - Mairtín Crawford, poet and journalist (born 1967).
- 5 February - Harry West, leader of the Ulster Unionist Party from 1974 to 1979, Stormont MP, Minister for Agriculture (born 1917).
- 2 March - Cormac McAnallen, Tyrone Gaelic footballer (born 1980).
- 13 April - Caron Keating, television presenter (born 1962).
- 24 June - Douglas Gageby, editor of Evening Press (1954–1959) and editor The Irish Times (1963–1974) and (1977–1986).
- 22 July - Bertie Peacock, footballer and football manager.
- 23 July - Joe Cahill, former Chief of Staff of the Provisional Irish Republican Army (born 1920).
- 7 September - Ian Cochrane, novelist (born 1941).
- 28 October - Jimmy McLarnin, boxer (born 1907)
- 5 November - Basil McIvor, Ulster Unionist politician (born 1928).
- 8 December - Digby McLaren, geologist and palaeontologist in Canada (born 1919).
- 26 December - Frank Pantridge, physician, cardiologist and inventor of the portable defibrillator (born 1916).

== See also ==
- 2004 in England
- 2004 in Scotland
- 2004 in Wales
