= 1926 in Northern Ireland =

- Centuries: 20th; 21st
- Decades: 1920s; 1930s; 1940s
- See also: 1926 in the United Kingdom; 1926 in Ireland; Other events of 1926; List of years in Northern Ireland

Events during the year 1926 in Northern Ireland.

== Incumbents ==
- Governor - The Duke of Abercorn
- Prime Minister - James Craig

== Events ==
- 21 January – The Northern Ireland Minister for Agriculture meets his Free State counterpart, Patrick Hogan. The meeting paves the way for co-operation in securing better animal health for livestock.
- 18 April – Census held in Northern Ireland (and the Free State). The population of Northern Ireland is 1,257,000.

== Sport ==
=== Football ===
- International

13 February Northern Ireland 3 - 0 Wales
27 February Scotland 4 - 0 Northern Ireland (in Glasgow)
20 October England 3 - 3 Northern Ireland (in Liverpool)

- Irish League

Winners: Belfast Celtic

- Irish Cup

Winners: Belfast Celtic 3 - 2 Linfield

=== Golf ===
- Royal County Down Golf Club bring in Harry Colt to make further improvements to the course.

== Births ==
- 20 January – Sarah Conlon, housewife and successful campaigner for the release of the Guildford Four (died 2008).
- 10 February – Danny Blanchflower, footballer and football manager (died 1993)
- 10 February – Jack Kyle, international rugby player (died 2014)
- 6 April – Ian Paisley, founder of the Democratic Unionist Party and First Minister of Northern Ireland from 2007 to 2008 (died 2014)
- 9 April – Gerry Fitt, first leader of the Social Democratic and Labour Party (died 2005).
- 15 May – Margaret Guilfoyle, Senator for the state of Victoria (Australia) from 1971 to 1987 (died 2020).
- 6 June – Johnny McKenna, footballer (died 1980).
- 23 June – Paddy Doherty, activist (died 2016).
- 23 September – Stanley McMaster, barrister and Unionist Member of Parliament from 1959 to 1974 (died 1992).
- 6 November – Frank Carson, comedian (died 2012)
- Full date unknown – Gerry Adams, Sr., IRA volunteer, father of Gerry Adams (Sinn Féin President) (died 2003).

== See also ==
- 1926 in Scotland
- 1926 in Wales
