= 1924 in Northern Ireland =

- Centuries: 20th; 21st
- Decades: 1920s; 1930s; 1940s
- See also: 1924 in the United Kingdom; 1924 in Ireland; Other events of 1924; List of years in Northern Ireland

Events during the year 1924 in Northern Ireland.

== Incumbents ==
- Governor - The Duke of Abercorn
- Prime Minister - James Craig

== Events ==
- January & June – 1924 Northern Ireland local elections, following changes by the Unionist government, which has redrawn electoral districts, abolished the single transferable vote and implemented a requirement for members of local authorities to take an oath of allegiance to the UK.
- 24 March – Ballycastle Railway closes due to financial difficulties.
- 24 April – No agreement is reached at the Boundary Conference in London. The Irish Boundary Commission is now set up to examine the border between the Irish Free State and Northern Ireland.
- 6 May – James Craig refuses to nominate a Northern Ireland representative to the Boundary Commission.
- 11 August – Ballycastle Railway reopens under Northern Counties Committee ownership.
- 14 September – First BBC broadcast from Belfast (station 2BE).
- 24 October – Éamon de Valera is arrested at Newry Town Hall after defying an order preventing him from speaking in Northern Ireland.

== Sport ==
=== Football ===
- International

1 March Scotland 2 - 0 Northern Ireland (in Glasgow)
15 March Northern Ireland 0 - 1 Wales
22 October England 3 - 1 Northern Ireland (in Liverpool)

- Irish League

Winners: Queen's Island

- Irish Cup

Winners: Queen's Island 1 - 0 Willowfield

== Births ==
- 12 January – Arthur Armstrong, painter (died 1996).
- 15 April – Padraic Fiacc, poet (died 2019).
- 18 April – Roy Mason, fourth Secretary of State for Northern Ireland (died 2015).
- 26 May – Sheelagh Murnaghan, only Ulster Liberal Party Member of Parliament at Stormont (died 1993).
- 11 July – Charlie Tully, footballer (died 1971).
- 26 September – Max Clendinning, architect and interior designer (died 2020).
- 2 December – William Craig, former Unionist MP and founder of the Ulster Vanguard movement (died 2011).
- 14 December – Andy Thompson, Canadian politician (died 2016).
- 17 December – Cecil Walker, Ulster Unionist Party MP for North Belfast from 1983 to 2001 (died 2007).
- Full date unknown – Kennedy Lindsay, Vanguard Progressive Unionist Party politician and British Ulster Dominion Party leader (died 1997) (born in Canada).

== Deaths ==
- 6 June – William Pirrie, 1st Viscount Pirrie, shipbuilder and businessman (born 1847).
- 22 October – Anne Marjorie Robinson, painter (born 1858).

== See also ==
- 1924 in Scotland
- 1924 in Wales
