= 2001 in Northern Ireland =

- Centuries: 20th; 21st
- Decades: 1980s; 1990s; 2000s; 2010s; 2020s
- See also: 2001 in the United Kingdom; 2001 in Ireland; Other events of 2001; List of years in Northern Ireland

Events during the year 2001 in Northern Ireland.

== Incumbents ==
- First Minister - David Trimble
  - Acting First Minister - Reg Empey (1 July – 6 November)
- Deputy First Minister - Seamus Mallon (until 6 November), Mark Durkan (from 6 November)
- Secretary of State - Peter Mandelson

== Events ==
- 29 April – 2001 United Kingdom Census carried out. Northern Ireland's population is 1,685,267.
- 3 – 10 June – The Men's 2001 World Amateur Boxing Championships were held in Belfast, with almost 400 boxers from 67 countries taking part in the Odyssey Arena event.
- 12 July – July 2001 Belfast riots.
- 15 June – Dispute arises between local loyalist and republican activists on the Crumlin Road peace line in North Belfast over the flying of loyalist paramilitary flags. Loyalists begin to picket the nearby Catholic primary school, beginning the Holy Cross dispute, continuing throughout June.
- 3 September – Loyalist pickets at Holy Cross resume when the school re-opens for a new term, leading to unrest and rioting.
- 23 October – The Provisional Irish Republican Army announces that it has begun to decommission its weapons.
- 4 November – The Police Service of Northern Ireland (PSNI) is established.
- 11 November – November 2001 Belfast riots
- 12 November – 400 police officers are involved in escorting the children and their parents to and from Holy Cross school.
- 17 November – The Gaelic Athletic Association votes to abolish its controversial Rule 21. Members of the British Army and the Police Service of Northern Ireland will henceforth be permitted to join the organisation.
- 22 November – First Minister David Trimble and deputy First Minister Mark Durkan meet with residents of Upper Ardoyne, and the next day, 23 November, the Holy Cross protests are called off after 14 weeks.
- 9 December – 2001 South Armagh attacks
- The Saint Patrick Visitor Centre opens in Downpatrick.
- The Irish League was won by Linfield.
- The Irish Cup was won by Glentoran after it defeated Linfield 1–0 after extra time.
- The Senior British Open Championship was held at Royal County Down Golf Club. Australian Ian Stanley won the tournament.
- The Ulster Grand Prix and North West 200 were cancelled due to Foot-and Mouth crisis.

== Deaths ==
- 14 August - Stanley Hewitt, cricketer (b. 1936).
- 28 September - Martin O'Hagan, journalist (b. 1950).
- 12 December - Michael Torrens-Spence, held commissions in the Royal Navy Fleet Air Arm, the Royal Air Force, the British Army, Ulster Special Constabulary and Ulster Defence Regiment (b. 1914).
- James Simmons, poet, literary critic and songwriter (b. 1933).

== See also ==
- 2001 in England
- 2001 in Scotland
- 2001 in Wales
