= 1927 in Northern Ireland =

- Centuries: 20th; 21st
- Decades: 1920s; 1930s; 1940s
- See also: 1927 in the United Kingdom; 1927 in Ireland; Other events of 1927; List of years in Northern Ireland

Events during the year 1927 in Northern Ireland.

== Incumbents ==
- Governor - The Duke of Abercorn
- Prime Minister - James Craig

== Events ==
- 12 April – The Royal and Parliamentary Titles Act 1927 renames the United Kingdom of Great Britain and Ireland to the United Kingdom of Great Britain and Northern Ireland. The change acknowledges that the Irish Free State is no longer part of the Kingdom.
- The Evangelical Presbyterian Church breaks away from the Presbyterian Church in Ireland.

== Sport ==
=== Football ===
- International

26 February Northern Ireland 0 - 2 Scotland
9 April Wales 2 - 2 Northern Ireland (in Cardiff)
22 October Northern Ireland 2 - 0 England

- Irish League

Winners: Belfast Celtic

- Irish Cup

Winners: Ards 3 - 2 Cliftonville

=== Golf ===
- British Ladies Amateur Golf Championship is held at Royal County Down Golf Club (winner: Simone de la Chaume).
- Belvoir Park Golf Club opened in Belfast.

=== Greyhound racing ===
- 18 April – The first greyhound racing track in Ireland opens at Celtic Park (Belfast).

== Births ==
- 8 April – Deborah Brown, sculptor (died 2023).
- 19 May – Billy McMillen, Official Irish Republican Army officer (killed in feud with Irish National Liberation Army 1975).
- 8 June – Brendan Smyth, Catholic priest and convicted child sexual abuser (died 1997).
- 2 July – R. J. G. Savage, palaeontologist (died 1998 in England).
- 8 July – Maurice Hayes, public servant, writer and independent member of Seanad Éireann (died 2017).
- July - Thomas Teevan, Unionist politician and lawyer (died 1954).
- 31 August – Thomas McCloy, cricketer (died 2014).
- 1 October – Alf McMichael, footballer (died 2006).
- 23 November – John Cole, political journalist and broadcaster (died 2013 in England).

== Deaths ==
- 22 April – Robert John McConnell, businessman, baronet and Lord Mayor of Belfast (born 1853).
- 3 May – Tom Gallaher, tobacco manufacturer (born 1840).

== See also ==
- 1927 in Scotland
- 1927 in Wales
