= 1995 in Northern Ireland =

- Centuries: 20th; 21st
- Decades: 1970s; 1980s; 1990s; 2000s; 2010s
- See also: 1995 in the United Kingdom; 1995 in Ireland; Other events of 1995; List of years in Northern Ireland

Events during the year 1995 in Northern Ireland.

== Incumbents ==
- Secretary of State - Patrick Mayhew

== Events ==
- 27 January - Taoiseach John Bruton, and Gerry Adams hold their first formal discussions.
- 22 February - The British Prime Minister, John Major, and the Irish Taoiseach, John Bruton, launch the framework document regarding Northern Ireland.
- 7 March - Sir Patrick Mayhew, Northern Ireland Secretary, sets out the conditions for Sinn Féin to join all-party talks, including 'the actual decommissioning of some arms.'
- 19 May - Elizabeth II and The Duke of Edinburgh make a visit to Northern Ireland. On the same day US President Bill Clinton approves a visa for Gerry Adams to enter the United States.
- 4 June - Ireland qualifies for the quarter-finals of the Rugby World Cup.
- 13 August - Gerry Adams tells a rally in Belfast that the IRA 'haven't gone away.'
- 9 September - David Trimble becomes leader of the Ulster Unionist Party.
- 30 November - American President Bill Clinton and his wife Hillary spend the day in Northern Ireland.

== Arts and literature ==
- 5 October - Seamus Heaney is awarded the Nobel Prize for Literature.
- BBC Northern Ireland television broadcasts The Hole in the Wall Gang's comedy Two Ceasefires and a Wedding, the pilot for Give My Head Peace.
- Ormeau Baths Gallery opened in Belfast, on the site of a Victorian bath house.
- Phil Coulter writes the anthem "Ireland's Call" to a commission from the Irish Rugby Football Union.
- Michael Longley's translation of classical verse into Ulster Scots, The Ghost Orchid, is published.

== Sport ==
=== Boxing ===
- Wayne McCullough wins WBC Bantamweight title.

=== Football ===
- Irish League

Winners: Crusaders

- Irish Cup

Winners: Linfield 3 - 1 Carrick Rangers

- FAI Cup

Winners: Derry City 2 - 1 Shelbourne

- Harry Gregg, former international footballer, awarded an MBE.

=== Gaelic Athletic Association ===
- September 17 - Dublin are the All-Ireland football Champions following victory over Tyrone. Peter Canavan is unlucky to be on the losing side following his personal haul of 11 points in the final.

== Births ==
- 21 January - Andrew Watson, racing driver

== Deaths ==
- 29 March - Jimmy McShane (a.k.a. Baltimora), dancer and singer (born 1957).
- 6 May - Noel Brotherston, footballer (born 1956).
- 7 June - Joseph Tomelty, actor, novelist and playwright (born 1911).
- 27 June - Gordon Wilson, peace campaigner (born 1927).
- 21 September - Frank Hall, journalist and satirist (born 1921).

== See also ==
- 1995 in England
- 1995 in Scotland
- 1995 in Wales
