= 1930 in Northern Ireland =

- Centuries: 20th; 21st
- Decades: 1920s; 1930s; 1940s; 1950s
- See also: 1930 in the United Kingdom; 1930 in Ireland; Other events of 1930; List of years in Northern Ireland

Events during the year 1930 in Northern Ireland.

== Incumbents ==
- Governor – The Duke of Abercorn
- Prime Minister – James Craig

== Events ==
- The Education (Northern Ireland) Act restores 50% government funding to Voluntary (chiefly Catholic) schools and allows religious instruction in controlled schools.

== Sport ==
=== Football ===
- International

1 February Northern Ireland 7 – 0 Wales (Joe Bambrick scored six of the goals)
22 February Scotland 3 – 1 Northern Ireland (in Glasgow)
20 October England 5 – 1 Northern Ireland (in Sheffield)

- Irish League

Winners: Linfield

- Irish Cup

Winners: Linfield 4 – 3 Ballymena United

== Births ==
- 8 March – Douglas Hurd, seventh Secretary of State for Northern Ireland.
- 8 May – Heather Harper, operatic soprano (died 2019).
- 9 July – Hugh Morrow, footballer and manager (died 2020).
- 23 September – Colin Blakely, actor (died 1987).
- Jim Anderson, loyalist paramilitary
- Tomás Ó Canainn, electrical engineer and traditional musician (died 2013).

== Deaths ==
- 10 August – May Crommelin, novelist and travel writer (born 1849/1850).
- 1 October – James Whiteside McCay, Lieutenant General in the Australian Army, member of the Victorian and Australian Parliaments (born 1864).

== See also ==
- 1930 in Scotland
- 1930 in Wales
