= 1937 in Northern Ireland =

- Centuries: 20th; 21st
- Decades: 1920s; 1930s; 1940s; 1950s
- See also: 1937 in the United Kingdom; 1937 in Ireland; Other events of 1937; List of years in Northern Ireland

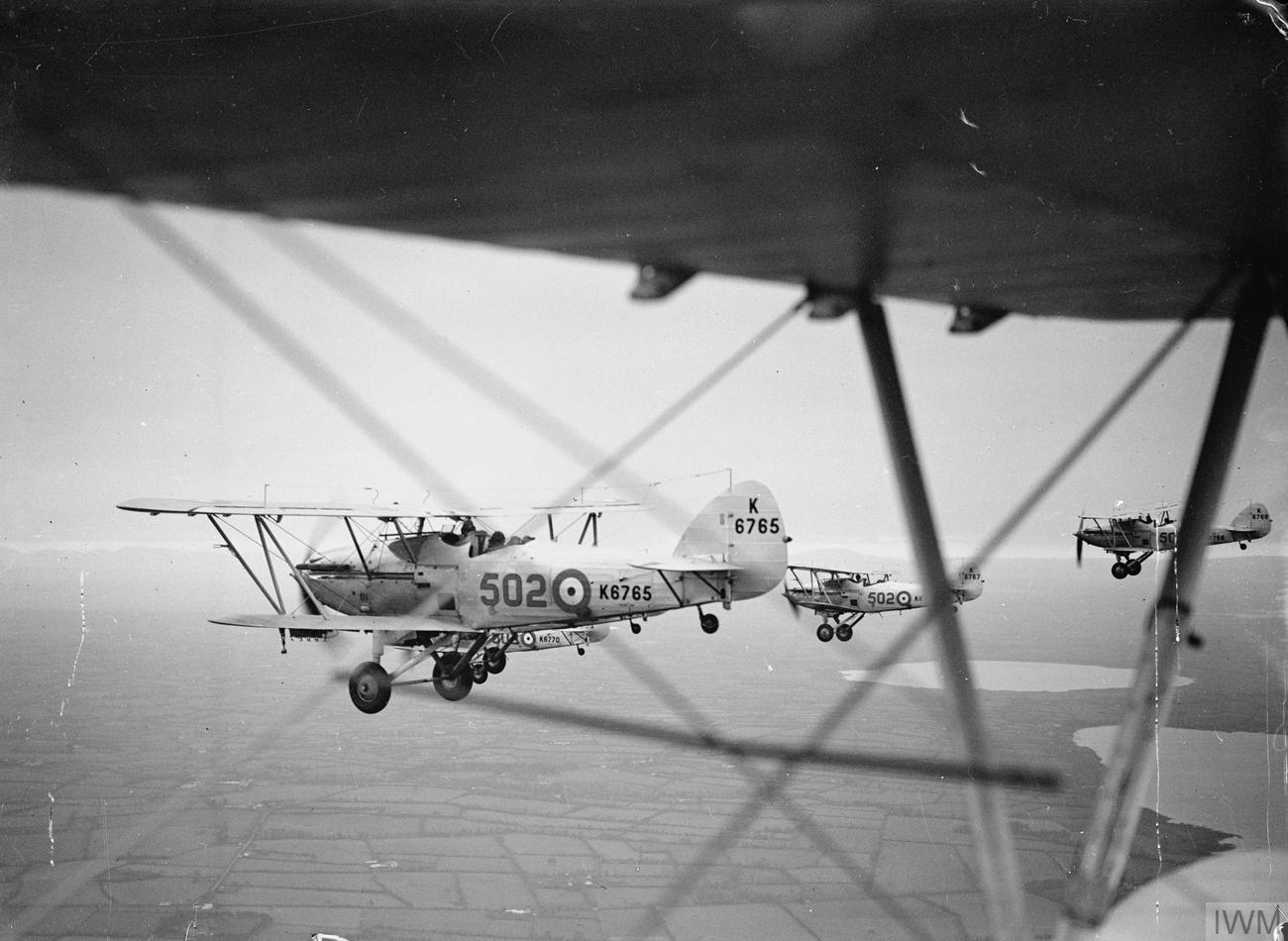
Squadron in flight from RAF Aldergrove, Northern Ireland, November 1937

Events during the year 1937 in Northern Ireland.

== Incumbents ==
- Governor - The Duke of Abercorn
- Prime Minister - James Craig

== Events ==
- 28 February – Population census in Northern Ireland.
- 28 July – Assassination attempt on King George VI in Belfast by the Irish Republican Army.

== Arts and literature ==
- Louis MacNeice writes the poem Carrickfergus.

== Sport ==
=== Football ===
- Irish League

Winners: Belfast Celtic

- Irish Cup

Winners: Belfast Celtic 3 - 0 Linfield

== Births ==
- 18 January – John Hume, leader of the Social Democratic and Labour Party, MP, MEP and Nobel Peace Prize winner (died 2020).
- 10 February – Roy Megarry, businessman and publisher in Canada.
- 2 April – Denis Tuohy, television presenter.
- 27 April – Robin Eames, Church of Ireland Primate of All Ireland and Archbishop of Armagh from 1986 to 2006.
- 16 December – Given Lyness, cricketer.
- 24 December – John Taylor, Baron Kilclooney, Ulster Unionist Party MP and life peer.

== Deaths ==
- 31 January – Samuel Edgar, cricketer (born 1913).
- 3 February – Thomas Moles, Ulster Unionist politician and journalist (born 1871).
- 9 February - Sir Samuel Kelly, coal merchant, philanthropist and businessperson, founder of John Kelly Limited (born 1879).
- 27 February – Charles Donnelly, poet, killed at the Jarama Front, Spanish Civil War (born 1914).
- 27 June – Arthur Douglas, cricketer and rugby player (born 1902).
- Herbert Hughes, musicologist, composer and critic (born 1882).

== See also ==
- 1937 in Scotland
- 1937 in Wales
