= 2010 in Northern Ireland =

- Centuries: 20th; 21st
- Decades: 1990s; 2000s; 2010s; 2020s
- See also: 2010 in the United Kingdom; 2010 in Ireland; Other events of 2010; List of years in Northern Ireland

Events during the year 2010 in Northern Ireland.

== Incumbents ==
- First Minister - Peter Robinson
  - Acting First Minister - Arlene Foster (11 January – 3 February)
- deputy First Minister - Martin McGuiness
- Secretary of State - Shaun Woodward (until 11 May), Owen Paterson (from 11 May)

== Events ==
=== January ===
- 6 January – The Ulster Defence Association (UDA) confirms that all weaponry under its control has been put verifiably beyond use.
- 8 January
  - PSNI Constable Peadar Heffron is seriously injured as a bomb explodes under his car in Randalstown. Dissident republicans are blamed for the attack.
  - Iris Robinson scandal emerges.
- 11 January – Peter Robinson temporarily steps aside as First Minister, designating Arlene Foster to act in his place.
- 20 January – Talks between Sinn Féin and the DUP about the devolution of policing and justice powers to the Northern Ireland administration come to an end.
- 23 January – The Sinn Féin party executive meets to discuss the talks position.
- 25 January – UK Prime Minister, Gordon Brown and Taoiseach Brian Cowen travel to Hillsborough Castle for talks with the parties.
- 26 January – The two Prime Ministers remain in the Hillsborough Castle talks and all-party discussions begin.
- 27 January – The two Prime Ministers leave without an agreement being reached, giving the parties 48 hours to reach agreement, otherwise the governments would publish plans for moving the political process forward.
- 31 January
  - Talks, which have continued all week, break for the day with reports of "considerable progress" having been made.
  - At the annual Bloody Sunday commemoration march, the victims' families call for the immediate release of the delayed Saville Inquiry report.

=== February ===
- 3 February – Peter Robinson resumes his role as First Minister, but has yet to convince his party to accept a deal.
- 5 February – Justice and policing powers are to be devolved to Northern Ireland's power-sharing government from 12 April 2010 following agreement between Sinn Féin and the DUP, endorsed by the presence of the British and Irish Prime Ministers.
- 6 February – Mark Durkan delivers his final address to the SDLP as party leader at its annual conference in Newcastle, County Down, where a new leader will be elected.
- 7 February – The SDLP elect Margaret Ritchie (current Minister for Social Development) as new party leader, making her the first female leader of a major NI party.
- 19 February – A mortar bomb is abandoned near a police station in Keady, supposedly by Dissident republicans, leading to a long security alert.
- 22 February – A car bomb weighing up to 250 lbs explodes outside Newry Courthouse damaging buildings. No-one is killed or injured; dissident republicans are blamed for the attack.

=== March ===
- 9 March – A cross-community vote on devolving policing and justice powers is to be held in the NI Assembly, it is announced.
- 17 March – Peter Robinson and Martin McGuinness are to meet President of the United States Barack Obama in Washington, D.C., it is announced.

=== April ===
- 12 April – Justice and policing powers are to be devolved to Northern Ireland's power-sharing government.

=== May ===
- 6 May – 2010 UK General Election takes place and the results for Northern Ireland are: Democratic Unionist Party (8 Seats), Sinn Féin (5 Seats), SDLP (3 Seats), Alliance (1 Seat) and Independent (1 Seat). The First Minister of Northern Ireland, Peter Robinson, loses his seat of Belfast East to Naomi Long of the Alliance Party, giving the Alliance Party its first Westminster seat since 1974.

=== July ===
- 11–14 July – 2010 Northern Ireland riots occur.

=== September ===
- 22 September – Tom Elliott is elected to be leader of the Ulster Unionist Party (UUP).

=== November ===
- 14 November – Sinn Féin president Gerry Adams announces that he plans to step down as an MP and Stormont assembly member to stand for election in the Irish Republic.

=== December ===
- 29 December – Thousands of bottles of water are sent to Northern Ireland by the Scottish Government to help supply households cut off from mains supplies.

== Arts and literature ==
- 26 January
  - A blue plaque is unveiled at Montrose Street South, Ballymacarrett, Belfast, the location of the house in which playwright Sam Thompson was born, on the 50th anniversary of the first performance of his controversial play Over The Bridge.
  - Formation of Opera Company NI is announced, funded by the Arts Council of Northern Ireland, and incorporating the best resources from Castleward Opera and Opera Fringe.
- 31 January – Successful Belfast4Haiti music events are held in Belfast – One day, One cause, 50 Acts.
- 15–30 October – 48th Ulster Bank Belfast Festival at Queen's.
- Miriam Gamble's poetry collection The Squirrels Are Dead is published.

== Sport ==
- 21 January – Kris Meeke, winner of the Intercontinental Rally Challenge title in 2009, crashes out of the Monte Carlo Rally for the second year running.
- 23 January – Antrim International Cross Country Races.
- 3 May – Deep RiverRock Belfast City Marathon.
- 26–30 July – Northern Ireland Milk Cup 2010, Coleraine.

=== Rugby Union ===
- 6 January – Ireland 29-11 Italy
- 13 February – France 33-10 Ireland
- 27 February – England 16-20 Ireland
- 13 March – Ireland-Wales
- 20 March – Ireland-Scotland

=== GAA ===
- 17 March – St. Galls (Antrim) defeat Kilmurry Ibrickane (Clare) to win the All-Ireland Senior Club Football Championship for the first time in club history.
- 18 July – Tyrone defeat Monaghan to win the Ulster Senior Football Championship.
- 19 September – Cork defeat Down to win the All-Ireland Senior Football Championship, while Tyrone defeat Cork in the Minor final.

== Deaths ==
- 12 January – Allen McClay, businessman and philanthropist (born 1932)
- 30 September – Sir Barry Shaw, barrister, first Director of Public Prosecutions for Northern Ireland (born 1923)
- 16 December – A. T. Q. Stewart, historian (born 1929)

== See also ==
- 2010 in England
- 2010 in Scotland
- 2010 in Wales
