= 1936 in Northern Ireland =

- Centuries: 20th; 21st
- Decades: 1920s; 1930s; 1940s; 1950s
- See also: 1936 in the United Kingdom; 1936 in Ireland; Other events of 1936; List of years in Northern Ireland

Events during the year 1936 in Northern Ireland.

== Incumbents ==
- Governor - The Duke of Abercorn
- Prime Minister - James Craig

== Events ==
- Public Order Act is introduced, giving the Chief Constable power to impose conditions on parades or public processions if it is believed that they would lead to public disorder.
- The British Air Ministry forms a new aircraft factory in Belfast, creating a new company owned 50% each by Harland and Wolff and Short Brothers, Short & Harland Ltd.

== Arts and literature ==
- Belfast School of Music opens its new premises.
- Construction begins on the BBC's Broadcasting House, Belfast.
- 1 November – Louis MacNeice's translation of The Agamemnon of Aeschylus is premiered in London.

== Sport ==
=== Football ===
- Irish League

Winners: Belfast Celtic

- Irish Cup

Winners: Linfield 2 - 0 Derry City

== Births ==
- 20 February – Roy Beggs, Ulster Unionist Party MP.
- 7 March – Freddie Gilroy, boxer.
- 13 March – Stanley Hewitt, cricketer (died 2001).
- 5 April – John Kelly, Sinn Féin Councillor and MLA (died 2007).
- 24 April – Robert McCartney, leader of UK Unionist Party, MLA and a QC.
- 10 June – Brendan Duddy, businessman and intermediary in the Northern Ireland peace process (died 2017).
- 1 August – Leonard Steinberg, Baron Steinberg, British life peer, businessman and multi-millionaire.
- 17 August – Seamus Mallon, Deputy Leader of the Social Democratic and Labour Party and first Deputy First Minister of Northern Ireland (died 2020).
- 7 September - George Cassidy, jazz musician and music teacher of Van Morrison (died 2023).
- 24 September – John Magee SPS, Bishop of Cloyne (1987- ), private secretary to Pope John Paul II.
- 5 October – Brian Hannon, Bishop of Clogher (Church of Ireland) (1986-2001).
- 22 December – James Burke, science historian, author and television presenter-producer.
- Date unknown - Dave Finlay Sr, professional wrestler, wrestling school owner and holder of MBE.

== Deaths ==
- 30 November – Jimmy Elwood, footballer (born 1901).

== See also ==
- 1936 in Scotland
- 1936 in Wales
