= 1932 in Northern Ireland =

- Centuries: 20th; 21st
- Decades: 1920s; 1930s; 1940s; 1950s
- See also: 1932 in the United Kingdom; 1932 in Ireland; Other events of 1932; List of years in Northern Ireland

Events during the year 1932 in Northern Ireland.

== Incumbents ==
- Governor - The Duke of Abercorn
- Prime Minister - James Craig

== Events ==
- 21 May – Amelia Earhart lands near Culmore, having become the first woman to fly solo nonstop across the Atlantic.
- 5 July – The Chapel of the Holy Spirit in St Anne's Cathedral, Belfast is dedicated.
- 3–14 October – Belfast Outdoor Relief Strike, uniting Catholic and Protestant working class communities.
- 16 November – Edward, Prince of Wales travels to Belfast for the first time to open the new Parliament buildings.
- 22 November – The new Northern Ireland Parliament Buildings at Stormont are officially opened.

== Sport ==
=== Football ===
- Irish League

Winners: Linfield

- Irish Cup

Winners: Glentoran 2 – 1 Linfield

== Births ==
- 31 January – Ottilie Patterson, singer, "the godmother of British blues" (died 2011 in Scotland).
- 21 March – Allen McClay, businessman and philanthropist (died 2010).
- 1 July – Stratton Mills, Ulster Unionist Party and Alliance Party MP.
- July – Basil Blackshaw, painter.
- 27 October – Harry Gregg, international football goalkeeper and manager (died 2020).
- 3 November – John McNally, boxer.
- 4 November – Tommy Makem, folk musician, artist, poet and storyteller (died 2007).
- 12 November – Joe Hendron, SDLP MP.
- December – Declan Mulholland, actor (died 1999).

== See also ==
- 1932 in Scotland
- 1932 in Wales
