= List of years in Northern Ireland =

This is a list of years in Northern Ireland which was established on 3 May 1921. For only articles about years in Northern Ireland that have been written, see Category:Years in Northern Ireland.

== Twenty-first century ==
2029 – 2028 – 2027 – 2026 – 2025 – 2024 – 2023 – 2022 – 2021 – 2020
2019 – 2018 – 2017 – 2016 – 2015 – 2014 – 2013 – 2012 – 2011 – 2010
2009 – 2008 – 2007 – 2006 – 2005 – 2004 – 2003 – 2002 – 2001

== Twentieth century ==
2000 – 1999 – 1998 – 1997 – 1996 – 1995 – 1994 – 1993 – 1992 – 1991
1990 – 1989 – 1988 – 1987 – 1986 – 1985 – 1984 – 1983 – 1982 – 1981
1980 – 1979 – 1978 – 1977 – 1976 – 1975 – 1974 – 1973 – 1972 – 1971
1970 – 1969 – 1968 – 1967 – 1966 – 1965 – 1964 – 1963 – 1962 – 1961
1960 – 1959 – 1958 – 1957 – 1956 – 1955 – 1954 – 1953 – 1952 – 1951
1950 – 1949 – 1948 – 1947 – 1946 – 1945 – 1944 – 1943 – 1942 – 1941
1940 – 1939 – 1938 – 1937 – 1936 – 1935 – 1934 – 1933 – 1932 – 1931
1930 – 1929 – 1928 – 1927 – 1926 – 1925 – 1924 – 1923 – 1922 – 1921

== See also ==
- List of years in the United Kingdom
  - List of years in England
  - List of years in Scotland
  - List of years in Wales
