= 1999 in Northern Ireland =

- Centuries: 20th; 21st
- Decades: 1970s; 1980s; 1990s; 2000s; 2010s
- See also: 1999 in the United Kingdom; 1999 in Ireland; Other events of 1999; List of years in Northern Ireland

Events during the year 1999 in Northern Ireland.

== Incumbents ==
- First Minister - David Trimble
- Deputy First Minister - Seamus Mallon
- Secretary of State - Mo Mowlam (until 11 October), Peter Mandelson (from 11 October)

== Events ==
- 15 March - Rosemary Nelson, a Lurgan solicitor, is killed in a car bomb attack by loyalist paramilitary group the Red Hand Defenders.
- April - Senator George Mitchell Peace Bridge opened across the Border.
- 14 May - The fully renovated St George's Market in Belfast reopens its doors.
- 21 October - Peter Mandelson arrives in Belfast as the new Secretary of State for Northern Ireland.
- 29 November - Ten designated ministers are appointed to the power-sharing executive of the Northern Ireland Assembly.
- 2 December - The Irish Government ratifies changes to Articles 2 and 3 of the Constitution. Direct rule from Westminster in Northern Ireland ends.
- 13 December - The first meeting of the North/South Ministerial Council takes place in Armagh.
- Nuala O'Loan is appointed as first Police Ombudsman for Northern Ireland.

Date unknown

- Sirocco Works closes down for plans of redevelopment.

== Arts and literature ==
- Ciaran Carson publishes The Ballad of HMS Belfast: A Compendium of Belfast Poems.
- Seamus Heaney publishes a verse translation of Beowulf from the Old English.
- Glenn Patterson publishes his novel The International.

== Sport ==
=== Athletics ===
- The 27th IAAF World Cross Country Championships were held 27–28 March in Belfast.

=== Football ===
- Ulster Senior Football Championship

Winners: Armagh

- Ulster Senior Club Football Championship

Winners: Crossmaglen Rangers

- Irish League

Winners: Glentoran

- Irish Cup

Winners: Portadown (as Cliftonville were disqualified)

=== Golf ===
- The Amateur Championship is held at Royal County Down Golf Club, (winner:Graeme Storm).

== Births ==
- 4 January - Ross Corrigan, rower

== Deaths ==
=== January to June ===
- 11 January - Brian Moore, novelist (b.1921).
- 15 January - Robert Lowry, Baron Lowry, Lord Chief Justice of Northern Ireland (b.1919).
- 28 January - Markey Robinson, artist (b.1918).
- 15 March - Rosemary Nelson, solicitor killed by loyalist paramilitary group.
- 4 April - Sir James Flanagan, first and only Roman Catholic Chief Constable of the Royal Ulster Constabulary. (b.1914).
- 3 May - Paddy Kennedy, Republican Labour Party Councillor and MP (b.1942).
- 6 June - Billy Brown, musician and artist (b.1943).
- 29 June - Declan Mulholland, actor (b.1932).

=== July to December ===
- 1 July - William Whitelaw, 1st Viscount Whitelaw, first Secretary of State for Northern Ireland.
- 15 August - Paddy Devlin, a founder of the SDLP, a member of the 1974 Power Sharing Executive and author (b.1925).
- 21 August - Noel Larmour, cricketer and diplomat (b.1916).
- 23 August - James White, science fiction novelist (b.1928).
- 15 October - Josef Locke, tenor (b.1917).

=== Full date unknown ===
- Eamon Collins, Provisional Irish Republican Army activist and writer (b.1954).

== See also ==
- 1999 in England
- 1999 in Scotland
- 1999 in Wales
