= 1934 in Northern Ireland =

- Centuries: 20th; 21st
- Decades: 1920s; 1930s; 1940s; 1950s
- See also: 1934 in the United Kingdom; 1934 in Ireland; Other events of 1934; List of years in Northern Ireland

Events during the year 1934 in Northern Ireland.

== Incumbents ==
- Governor - The Duke of Abercorn
- Prime Minister - James Craig

== Events ==
- 20 January – The funeral of the veteran nationalist Member of Parliament, Joseph Devlin, takes place in Belfast.
- 27 January – Presentation of Belfast Castle to the City of Belfast by the Earl of Shaftesbury is announced.
- 28 March – Belfast Zoo opens in part of Bellevue Pleasure Gardens.
- 24 April – In a debate in the Parliament of Northern Ireland, the Prime Minister, Lord Craigavon, states "All I boast of is that we are a Protestant Parliament and a Protestant State." (often misquoted as "A Protestant Parliament for a Protestant People").
- 29 May – King's Hall, Belfast, the largest exhibition venue in Northern Ireland, is opened.

== Sport ==
=== Football ===
- Irish League

Winners: Linfield

- Irish Cup

Winners: Linfield 4 - 0 Cliftonville

- Ballymena Football Club is renamed Ballymena United F.C.

== Births ==
- 20 January – Josias Cunningham, stock broker, farmer and politician (died 2000).
- 3 March – Peter Brooke, 9th Secretary of State for Northern Ireland.
- 8 April – Wilson Clyde, former Democratic Unionist Party politician.
- 14 May – Francis Fee, cricketer.
- 23 May – Syd Millar, former international rugby player and chairman of the International Rugby Board.
- 28 June – Robert Carswell, Baron Carswell, barrister and judge.
- 4 July – James Hamilton, 5th Duke of Abercorn, soldier, politician and peer.
- 18 August – Ronnie Carroll, singer and entertainer (died 2015).
- 14 November – Catherine McGuinness, President of the Law Reform Commission and former justice of the Supreme Court of Ireland.

== Deaths ==
- 18 January – Joseph Devlin, Nationalist politician and MP in the British House of Commons and in Northern Ireland (born 1872).
- April – Robert McCall, lawyer (born 1849).

== See also ==
- 1934 in Scotland
- 1934 in Wales
