= 1993 in Northern Ireland =

- Centuries: 20th; 21st
- Decades: 1970s; 1980s; 1990s; 2000s; 2010s
- See also: 1993 in the United Kingdom; 1993 in Ireland; Other events of 1993; List of years in Northern Ireland

Events during the year 1993 in Northern Ireland.

== Incumbents ==
- Secretary of State – Patrick Mayhew

== Events ==
- 24 June – Northern Ireland Minister Michael Mates resigns over links with tycoon Asil Nadir.
- 23 October – Shankill Road bombing carried out by the Provisional Irish Republican Army in Belfast. There are 10 fatalities, including the bomber.
- 30 October – Greysteel massacre carried out by Ulster Freedom Fighters, at the Rising Sun Bar in Greysteel. Eight civilians are shot dead.
- 9 December – Footballer Danny Blanchflower dies of Alzheimer's disease aged 67.
- 15 December – Albert Reynolds and John Major issue their joint Downing Street Declaration.

== Arts and literature ==
- Ciarán Carson's First Language: Poems collection is published and wins the T. S. Eliot Prize.

== Sport ==
=== Football ===
- Irish League

Winners: Linfield

- Irish Cup

Winners: Bangor 1 – 1, 1 – 1, 1 – 0 Ards (all matches after extra time)

=== Motorcycling ===
- Cookstown 100 125cc race

Winner: Robert Dunlop

=== Mountaineering ===
- 27 May – Belfast architect Dawson Stelfox becomes one of the first Irish people to reach the summit of Mount Everest.

== Births ==
- 24 November – Saoirse-Monica Jackson, actress

== Deaths ==
- 23 March – Denis Parsons Burkitt, surgeon (born 1911).
- 14 September – Sheelagh Murnaghan, only Ulster Liberal Party Member of Parliament at Stormont (born 1924).
- 23 October – Thomas Begley, Provisional Irish Republican Army member killed planting a bomb (born 1970).
- 15 November – Jimmy McAlinden, footballer and football manager (born 1917).
- 9 December – Danny Blanchflower, footballer and football manager (born 1926).

== See also ==
- 1993 in England
- 1993 in Scotland
- 1993 in Wales
