= 2007 in Northern Ireland =

- Centuries: 20th; 21st
- Decades: 1980s; 1990s; 2000s; 2010s; 2020s
- See also: 2007 in the United Kingdom; 2007 in Ireland; Other events of 2007; List of years in Northern Ireland

Events during the year 2007 in Northern Ireland.

== Incumbents ==
- First Minister - Ian Paisley (from 8 May)
- Deputy First Minister - Martin McGuinness (from 8 May)
- Secretary of State - Peter Hain (until 28 June), Shaun Woodward (from 28 June)

== Events ==
- 22 January – Report by the Police Ombudsman for Northern Ireland states that the Special Branch of the then Royal Ulster Constabulary had colluded with loyalist paramilitaries in a number of murders and attempted murders in Northern Belfast between 1989 and 2002.
- 28 January – Special Sinn Féin Ard Fheis approves a motion calling for devolution of policing and justice to the Northern Ireland Assembly and support for the police services.
- 30 January, the Prime Minister confirms that assembly elections will go ahead as planned on 7 March. The 'transitional assembly' is thus dissolved, after which campaigning for the elections begins.
- 7 March – Elections took place for the suspended Northern Ireland Assembly.
- April – A 100-metre stainless steel 'spire of hope' is installed on St Anne's Cathedral, Belfast.
- 8 May – Power devolved; Northern Ireland Assembly meets; Ian Paisley becomes the second First Minister of Northern Ireland, with Martin McGuinness as Deputy First Minister.
- 8–10 June – First Garden Show Ireland staged, at Hillsborough Castle, launched by Dermot O'Neill.
- 26 June – Former Royal Canadian Mounted Police Assistant Commissioner Al Hutchinson is announced as the successor to Nuala O'Loan as Police Ombudsman for Northern Ireland.
- 28 June – Shaun Woodward MP appointed Secretary of State for Northern Ireland.
- June – Barbary lion cub is born at Belfast Zoo, the first Barbary lion to be born in Ireland.
- 17 July – Meeting of the North/South Ministerial Council including the Democratic Unionist Party (DUP) for the first time.
- 31 July – End of Operation Banner, the British Army deployment in Northern Ireland.
- 30 October – Ryanair starts services from George Best Belfast City Airport.
- October – Peter Robinson, Minister of Finance, introduces the first draft budget for consultation.
- 5 November – Al Hutchinson takes up the post of Police Ombudsman for Northern Ireland.
- 13 December – IKEA open their first store in Ireland at the Holywood Exchange, Belfast.
- December – Aer Lingus launch flights from their first base outside the Republic of Ireland at Belfast International Airport.
- 29 December – Nuala O'Loan, former Police Ombudsman for Northern Ireland, is appointed Dame Commander of the Order of the British Empire in the New Year Honours 2008.

== Arts and literature ==
- 8 February - Writer, broadcaster and journalist, Benedict Kiely, dies.
- 16 February - Maria Eagle, direct rule Arts Minister, announces a "one-off payment" of £150,000 to sustain the Belfast Festival at Queen's for one more year.
- 19 October - The 45th Belfast Festival at Queen's opens with a smaller than usual programme due to lack of funding.
- 18 December - Arts Minister, Edwin Poots, announces a grant of £300,000 over three years for Belfast Festival at Queen's.
- Malachi O'Doherty's memoir The Telling Year: Belfast 1972 is publishedl.

== Sport ==
=== Athletics ===
- 6 January - 30th Belfast International Cross Country Event, Stormont Estate, Belfast.
- 1 February - Armagh International 5k Road Race, The Mall, Armagh.
- 3 February - Northern Ireland and Ulster Cross Country Championships, University of Ulster, Coleraine. Individual winners: Kelly Reid and Brian Campbell.
- 17 February-18 February - Irish Indoor Athletics Championships, Odyssey Arena, Belfast.

=== Cricket ===
2007 Cricket World Cup: In a successful world cup debut, the Ireland cricket team qualified from the group stage for the Super 8 stage, notably defeating Pakistan cricket team in the process.

=== Football ===
- European Championship Qualifiers

24 March - Liechtenstein 1 - 4 Northern Ireland
28 March - Northern Ireland 2 - 1 Sweden
22 August - Northern Ireland 3 - 1 Liechtenstein
8 September - Latvia 1 - 0 Northern Ireland
12 September - Iceland 2 - 1 Northern Ireland
17 October - Sweden 1 - 1 Northern Ireland
17 November - Northern Ireland 2 - 1 Denmark
21 November - Spain 1 - 0 Northern Ireland
Northern Ireland came third in the group and failed to qualify.

- Other International Matches
  - Northern Ireland 0 - 0 Wales (6 February)
- Setanta Cup
  - Winners: Drogheda United
- Irish League
  - Winners: Linfield
- Irish Cup
  - Winners: Linfield

=== Gaelic Athletic Association ===
- 15 July - Tyrone defeat Monaghan 1–15 to 1–13 in the final of the Ulster Senior Football Championship.

=== Golf ===
- 8 September - 9 September - Walker Cup takes place at Royal County Down Golf Club, Newcastle, County Down.
- Pádraig Harrington wins the British Open in Carnoustie, Scotland. Rory McIlroy wins the silver medal for leading amateur. Darren Clarke misses the cut.

=== Motorcycling ===
- 12 May - North West 200
- 17 August - Ulster Grand Prix, Dundrod.

=== Rugby Union ===
- RBS Six Nations Championship

4 February - Wales 9 - 19 Ireland
11 February - Ireland 17 - 20 France
24 February - Ireland 43 - 13 England
10 March - Scotland 18 - 19 Ireland
17 March - Italy 24 - 51 Ireland
Ireland finished in second position in the Championship after France.

- 2007 Rugby World Cup
  - Ireland 32 - 17 Namibia
  - Ireland 14 - 10 Georgia
  - Ireland 3 - 25 France
  - Ireland 15 - 30 Argentina

== Deaths ==
- 3 January - Sir Cecil Walker, Ulster Unionist Member of Parliament for North Belfast (1983–2001), heart attack. (born 1924)
- 8 January - David Ervine, leader of the Progressive Unionist Party, heart attack leading to stroke and brain haemorrhage. (born 1953).
- 8 February - Benedict Kiely, writer, broadcaster and journalist (born 1919).
- 16 February - Norman Miscampbell, British Conservative Party MP (born 1925).
- 22 February - Miriam Mone, fashion designer (born 1965).
- 2 April - Emma Groves, blinded by a rubber bullet in 1971, became a leading campaigner for banning the use of plastic bullets, co-founder of the United Campaign Against Plastic Bullets (born 1920).
- 12 June - Eamonn Coleman, Gaelic footballer and manager (born 1948).
- 24 June - Derek Dougan, footballer (born 1938).
- 1 August - Tommy Makem, folk musician, artist, poet and storyteller (born 1932).
- 6 September - John Kelly, Sinn Féin Councillor and MLA (born 1936).
- 30 September - Len Graham, footballer (born 1925).
- 17 October - Sammy Duddy, member of the Ulster Political Research Group (born 1945).
- 3 November - Martin Meehan, Sinn Féin politician and former volunteer in the Provisional Irish Republican Army (born 1945).
- 13 November - Alec Cooke, Baron Cooke of Islandreagh, businessman and politician (born 1920).
- 31 December - Tommy Dickson, footballer (born 1929).

== See also ==
- 2007 in England
- 2007 in Scotland
- 2007 in Wales
