= 1994 in Northern Ireland =

- Centuries: 20th; 21st
- Decades: 1970s; 1980s; 1990s; 2000s; 2010s
- See also: 1994 in the United Kingdom; 1994 in Ireland; Other events of 1994; List of years in Northern Ireland

Events during the year 1994 in Northern Ireland.

== Incumbents ==
- Secretary of State - Patrick Mayhew

== Events ==
- 2 June - 1994 Scotland RAF Chinook crash: A Royal Air Force Chinook helicopter carrying almost all the United Kingdom's senior Northern Ireland intelligence experts, crashes on the Mull of Kintyre, Scotland, killing all 25 passengers and 4 crew members.
- 18 June - Loughinisland massacre: Members of the loyalist Ulster Volunteer Force attack a crowded bar at Loughinisland in County Down with assault rifles, killing six.
- 14 August - Disappearance of Arlene Arkinson, a 15-year-old Northern Irish teenager from Castlederg, County Tyrone. Her body has never been recovered.
- 31 August - The Provisional Irish Republican Army announces a complete cessation of military operations.
- 6 September - Taoiseach Albert Reynolds, John Hume and Gerry Adams hold an historic meeting at Government Buildings in Dublin. All three pledge their commitment to the democratic idea.
- 13 October - In a meeting at Fernhill House, Belfast, loyalist leader Gusty Spence announces that the Combined Loyalist Military Command, representing paramilitary groups, would observe a ceasefire, six weeks after the IRA.
- Armagh is restored to city status in the United Kingdom.
- Lagan Weir in Belfast is completed.
- Northern Ireland population estimated to be 1,643,700.

== Arts and literature ==
- 18 May - Anne Devlin's play After Easter is premiered in Stratford-upon-Avon and wins her the Lloyds Playwright of the Year award.
- 8 August - Marie Jones' monodrama A Night in November is premiered in Belfast, played by Dan Gordon.
- Colin Bateman's Divorcing Jack is published and is awarded the Betty Trask Prize by the Society of Authors, for the best debut by a writer under the age of 35.
- Maurice Leitch's novel Gilchrist is published.
- Eoin McNamee's novel Resurrection Man is published.
- Danny Morrison's novel On The Back of the Swallow is published.
- Paul Muldoon's poetry collection The Annals of Chile is published and wins the T. S. Eliot Prize.
- The alternative rock band Snow Patrol is formed by students from Northern Ireland at the University of Dundee.

== Sport ==
=== Football ===
- Irish League

Winners: Linfield

- Irish Cup

Winners: Linfield 2 - 0 Bangor

- FAI Cup

Winners: Sligo Rovers 1 - 0 Derry City

=== Motorcycling ===
- Robert Dunlop suffers a major accident at the Isle of Man Formula One TT, putting him out of action for the rest of 1994 and 1995.

== Deaths ==
- 11 July - Ray Smallwoods, Ulster Democratic Party leader.
- 19 September - Frankie Kennedy, traditional flute and tin whistle player and co-founder of Altan (born 1955).

== See also ==
- 1994 in England
- 1994 in Scotland
- 1994 in Wales
