= 1998 in Northern Ireland =

- Centuries: 20th; 21st
- Decades: 1970s; 1980s; 1990s; 2000s; 2010s
- See also: 1998 in the United Kingdom; 1998 in Ireland; Other events of 1998; List of years in Northern Ireland

Events during the year 1998 in Northern Ireland.

== Incumbents ==
- First Minister - David Trimble (from 1 July)
- Deputy First Minister - Seamus Mallon (from 1 July)
- Secretary of State - Mo Mowlam

== Events ==
- 9 January - British Secretary of State for Northern Ireland, Mo Mowlam, visits loyalist prisoners in the Maze prison. Afterward loyalists agree to attend the Stormont talks.
- 20 February - Sinn Féin is excluded from the Northern Ireland talks for two weeks. Protests in Belfast follow.
- 10 April (Good Friday) - The British and Irish governments and all the political parties in the Northern Ireland (except the Democratic Unionist Party) sign the Belfast Agreement.
- 19 May - John Hume and David Trimble join U2 on stage in Belfast as they make a direct appeal to young voters in Northern Ireland to vote 'yes' in the referendum on the Good Friday Agreement.
- 22 May - The Belfast Agreement is endorsed in a referendum by people north and south of the border.
- 25 June - The people of Northern Ireland go to the polls to elect a new Assembly.
- June - Crumlin Road Courthouse is closed and the site is eventually sold to a private developer.
- 1 July - The new Northern Ireland Assembly first meets, in "shadow" form; Reg Empey and Seamus Mallon are elected First Minister and deputy First Minister respectively.
- 12 July - Drumcree conflict: Three young children are killed in a loyalist Ulster Volunteer Force arson attack in Ballymoney.
- 15 August - Omagh bombing: 29 people die in a car bomb explosion near the centre of Omagh, County Tyrone, caused by the Real Irish Republican Army.
- 3 September - Bill Clinton, President of the United States, visits Omagh and views the bomb damage.
- 16 October - John Hume and David Trimble are announced as the winners of the Nobel Peace Prize.
- 6 November - David Trimble returns as First Minister in succession to Reg Empey.
- 10 December - John Hume and David Trimble are presented with the Nobel Peace Prize at a ceremony in Oslo, Norway.

== Arts and literature ==
- Malachi O'Doherty's study The Trouble With Guns: Republican Strategy and the Provisional IRA is published.

== Sport ==
=== Football ===
- Irish League

Winners: Cliftonville

- Irish Cup

Winners: Glentoran 1 - 0 Glenavon (after extra time).

=== Motorcycling ===
- Robert Dunlop wins the Ultra-Lightweight race at the Isle of Man TT.

== Deaths ==
- 2 September - Jackie Blanchflower, footballer (b.1933).
- 13 November - Valerie Hobson, actress (b.1917).

=== Full date unknown ===
- Sean McAloon, Uilleann piper and pipe maker (b.1923).

== See also ==
- 1998 in England
- 1998 in Scotland
- 1998 in Wales
