= 2000 in Northern Ireland =

- Centuries: 20th; 21st
- Decades: 1980s; 1990s; 2000s; 2010s; 2020s
- See also: 2000 in the United Kingdom; 2000 in Ireland; Other events of 2000; List of years in Northern Ireland

Events during the year 2000 in Northern Ireland.

== Incumbents ==
- First Minister - David Trimble
- Deputy First Minister - Seamus Mallon
- Secretary of State - Peter Mandelson

== Events ==
- 6 February - President of Ireland, Mary McAleese attends a concert at Clonard Monastery.
- 11 February - The British government suspends devolution in Northern Ireland.
- 25 March - David Trimble retains leadership of the Ulster Unionist Party at its annual general meeting, following a challenge from Martin Smyth.
- 12 April - The Royal Ulster Constabulary is presented with the George Cross by The Queen.
- 6 May - The IRA begins decommissioning its weapons.
- 30 May - Devolution returns to Northern Ireland.
- 28 July - last 80 prisoners leave the Maze Prison in Northern Ireland as part of the Northern Ireland peace process.
- 16 September - New extension to the Linen Hall Library is opened.
- 21 September - William McCrea of the Democratic Unionist Party wins the South Antrim by-election from the Ulster Unionist Party.
- 11 December - President Clinton of the United States arrives in Dublin for what is his last overseas journey as President.
- 13 December - Bill Clinton meets with the political leaders of Northern Ireland.

== Arts and literature ==
- James Fenton's poetry Thonner an Thon: an Ulster-Scots collection is published.
- Michael Longley's poetry collection The Weather in Japan is published and wins the T. S. Eliot Prize.
- 3 December - Susan Lynch receives an Irish Film and Television Academy Award for Best Leading Actress in the film Nora.

== Sport ==
=== Football ===
- Irish League

Winners: Linfield

- Irish Cup

Winners: Glentoran 1 - 0 Portadown

- Mid-Ulster Ladies F.C. is established playing at Cookstown.

=== Golf ===
- Senior British Open Championship held at Royal County Down Golf Club (winner:Christy O'Connor Jnr).

=== Ice Hockey ===
- The Belfast Giants ice hockey team is established and enters the Ice Hockey Superleague playing at the Odyssey Arena.

== Births ==
- 23 June – Caitlin Blackwood, actress
- 6 September – Nathan Timoney, rower

== Deaths ==
- 27 April - Clifford Forsythe, Ulster Unionist Member of Parliament for South Antrim (born 1929).
- 2 July - Joey Dunlop, motorcycle racer, in motorcycle racing accident (born 1952).
- 6 August - Joan Trimble, composer, pianist and newspaper proprietor (born 1915).
- 9 August - Josias Cunningham, stock broker, farmer and politician (born 1934).
- 24 October - Brian McConnell, Baron McConnell, Ulster Unionist MP in the Northern Ireland House of Commons and Minister (born 1922).

== See also ==
- 2000 in England
- 2000 in Scotland
- 2000 in Wales
