= 2003 in Northern Ireland =

- Centuries: 20th; 21st
- Decades: 1980s; 1990s; 2000s; 2010s; 2020s
- See also: 2003 in the United Kingdom; 2003 in Ireland; Other events of 2003; List of years in Northern Ireland

Events during the year 2003 in Northern Ireland.

== Incumbents ==
- First Minister - Suspended
- Deputy First Minister - Suspended
- Secretary of State - Paul Murphy

== Events ==
- 1 February - The Protestant Ulster Defence Association Belfast leader John Gregg is killed by a loyalist faction.
- 16 February - 100,000 people in Dublin, and 30,000 in Belfast march to express their opposition to the imminent invasion of Iraq.
- 7 April - United States President George W. Bush arrives in Northern Ireland for discussions with British Prime Minister Tony Blair. He also meets the Taoiseach Bertie Ahern, and the leaders of the pro-agreement parties.
- 31 August - The remains of Belfast mother Jean McConville, are found 31 years after she was abducted and murdered by the Provisional IRA, who accused her of being a British army agent.
- 15 September - For the first time the All-Ireland Football Final is contested by two teams from the same province. Tyrone are victorious over Armagh in the first All-Ulster Final.
- 27 November - The people of Northern Ireland go to the polls. The Democratic Unionist Party and Sinn Féin make massive gains at the expense of more moderate unionist and nationalist parties.
- Northern Ireland population estimated to be 1,702,600

== Arts and literature ==
- Ciarán Carson's poetry collection Breaking News is published and wins the Forward Poetry Prize (Best Poetry Collection of the Year).
- Sam Millar's novel Dark Souls is published.

== Sport ==
=== Football ===
- Irish League

Winners: Glentoran

- Irish Cup

Winners: Coleraine 1 - 0 Glentoran

- The Irish Football Association takes direct charge of the Northern Ireland national league with the creation of the Irish Premier League. The Irish Football League retains control of the First and Second Divisions.
- Northern Ireland finish bottom of UEFA Euro 2004 qualifying Group 6, having failed to score a single goal in qualifying.

=== Gaelic games ===
- Ulster Senior Football Championship - Tyrone defeat Down 0–23 to 1–05 in a replay, after a 1–17 to 4–08 draw.
- All-Ireland Football Final - Tyrone defeat Armagh 0–12 to 0–9 in the first final contested by two teams from the same province. It is also Tyrone's first All-Ireland title.

=== Ice Hockey ===
- The Elite Ice Hockey League was established to replace the Ice Hockey Superleague. Belfast Giants played in both leagues.

=== Motorcycling ===
- 16 December - Robert Dunlop announces he would quit motorcycle racing after the 2004 season.

=== Rugby Union ===
- Rugby World Cup - Ireland reach the quarter-finals of the competition before being beaten by France.

== Births ==
- Conor Bradley
- Shea Charles
- Micah Howie

== Deaths ==
- 14 August - Donal Lamont, former Catholic Bishop in Rhodesia (born 1911).
- 17 November - Gerry Adams Sr., father of Gerry Adams, Sinn Féin President (born 1926).
- 2 December - Alan Davidson (born 1924)

== See also ==
- 2003 in England
- 2003 in Scotland
- 2003 in Wales
