= 1938 in Northern Ireland =

- Centuries: 20th; 21st
- Decades: 1920s; 1930s; 1940s; 1950s
- See also: 1938 in the United Kingdom; 1938 in Ireland; Other events of 1938; List of years in Northern Ireland

Events during the year 1938 in Northern Ireland.

== Incumbents ==
- Governor - The Duke of Abercorn
- Prime Minister - James Craig

== Events ==
- 16 March – Belfast Harbour Airport at Sydenham is opened, with the inaugural commercial flight to Glasgow.
- 17 March – British Royal Navy cruiser HMS Belfast (C35) is launched at the Harland and Wolff shipyard in Belfast.
- 24 May – The new Anti-Partition Party takes eight seats in a Unionist-controlled Londonderry Corporation.

== Arts and literature ==
- April – Louis MacNeice publishes I Crossed the Minch and his poetry The Earth Compels.

== Sport ==
=== Football ===
- Irish League

Winners: Belfast Celtic

- Irish Cup

Winners: Belfast Celtic 2 - 0 Bangor

== Births ==
- 20 January – Derek Dougan, footballer (died 2007).
- 21 January – Ken Maginnis, Baron Maginnis of Drumglass, Ulster Unionist Party politician.
- 16 February – Sammy Chapman, footballer and football manager.
- 17 March – Keith Michael Patrick O'Brien, Archbishop of Saint Andrews and Edinburgh (died 2018 in Scotland.
- 3 April – Raymond Hunter, cricketer and rugby player (died 2020).
- 7 May – John Caldwell, boxer.
- 26 May – May Blood, Baroness Blood, community activist.
- 1 June – Desmond Boyd, community activist.
- 19 June – John Sheil, lawyer and judge.
- 25 July – Ken Kirkpatrick, cricketer.
- 28 August – Dick Creith, motorcycle road racer.

== Deaths ==
- 12 December – James McNeill, politician and second Governor-General of the Irish Free State (born 1869).

== See also ==
- 1938 in Scotland
- 1938 in Wales
