= 1929 in Northern Ireland =

- Centuries: 20th; 21st
- Decades: 1920s; 1930s; 1940s
- See also: 1929 in the United Kingdom; 1929 in Ireland; Other events of 1929; List of years in Northern Ireland

Events during the year 1929 in Northern Ireland.

== Incumbents ==
- Governor - The Duke of Abercorn
- Prime Minister - James Craig

== Events ==
- 8 February – A Belfast court sentences Fianna Fáil leader Éamon de Valera to one month in jail for illegally entering County Armagh.
- 22 May – Northern Ireland general election for the Parliament of Northern Ireland, the first held following abolition of the single transferable vote and the redrawing of electoral boundaries to create single-seat territorial constituencies. The Ulster Unionist Party retains a substantial majority.
- 30 May – United Kingdom general election.
- 23 July – Construction of the first 1000 ft (300 m)-long ocean liner, RMMV Oceanic, for the White Star Line, begun by Harland and Wolff in Belfast in 1928, is cancelled.
- Six banks in Northern Ireland begin to issue banknotes in sterling.

== Sport ==
=== Football ===
- International

2 February Wales 2 - 2 Northern Ireland (in Wrexham)
23 February Northern Ireland 3 - 7 Scotland
19 October Northern Ireland 0 - 3 England

- Irish League

Winners: Belfast Celtic

- Irish Cup

Winners: Ballymena United 2 - 1 Belfast Celtic

- Derry City joins the Irish League.

== Births ==
- 9 January – Brian Friel, playwright (died 2015).
- 29 June – Desmond Fennell, contrarian writer (died 2021).
- 8 July – A. T. Q. Stewart, historian (died 2010).
- 16 July – Tommy Dickson, footballer (died 2007).
- 25 August – Clifford Forsythe, Ulster Unionist MP for South Antrim (died 2000).
- 11 September – Patrick Mayhew, 10th Secretary of State for Northern Ireland (died 2016).
- 23 October – Robert Coulter, Ulster Unionist Party MLA (died 2018).

== Deaths ==
- 15 January – Priscilla Studd, Protestant Christian missionary, died in Spain (born 1864).
- 29 April – Otto Jaffe, twice elected as Irish Unionist Party Lord Mayor of Belfast (born 1846).

== See also ==
- 1929 in Scotland
- 1929 in Wales
