= 1939 in Northern Ireland =

- Centuries: 20th; 21st
- Decades: 1920s; 1930s; 1940s; 1950s
- See also: 1939 in the United Kingdom; 1939 in Ireland; Other events of 1939; List of years in Northern Ireland

Events during the year 1939 in Northern Ireland.

== Incumbents ==
- Governor - The Duke of Abercorn
- Prime Minister - James Craig

== Events ==
- 7 March – Harland and Wolff's Belfast shipyard launched the ocean liner RMS Andes for Royal Mail Lines.
- 17 April – Prime Minister of Northern Ireland Lord Craigavon, dismissed the Republic of Ireland government's position of neutrality as "cowardly".
- 4 May – The Prime Minister of Northern Ireland announced that conscription would not be extended to Northern Ireland.
- 17 August – Harland and Wolff's Belfast shipyard launched the aircraft carrier HMS Formidable for the Royal Navy.
- 3 September – The United Kingdom declared war on Germany following the German invasion of Poland on 1 September.

== Arts and literature ==
- 18 May – Louis MacNeice's Autumn Journal: a poem was published.
- June – The Northern Ireland Players performed Joseph Tomelty's Barnum is Right as their first commercial stage play.

== Sport ==
=== Football ===
- Irish League

Winners: Belfast Celtic

- Irish Cup

Winners: Linfield 2 – 0 Ballymena United

== Births ==
- 1 January – Billy Reid, volunteer in Provisional Irish Republican Army (killed in gunfight with British Army 1971)
- 13 April – Seamus Heaney, poet, writer and winner of the Nobel Prize in Literature (died 2013)
- 17 May – Eddie Magill, footballer and football manager
- 6 July – Mary Peters, pentathlete and 1972 Summer Olympics gold medal winner
- 27 July – Michael Longley, poet (died 2025)
- 9 August – Vincent Hanna, television journalist (died 1997)
- 16 August – Seán Brady, Archbishop of Armagh and Primate of All Ireland
- 11 October – Austin Currie, founder-member of the Social Democratic and Labour Party (SDLP), Fine Gael TD (died 2021)
- 8 December – James Galway, flautist
- Undated – Éamonn O'Doherty, sculptor (died 2011)

== Deaths ==
- 2 February – Amanda McKittrick Ros, novelist and poet noted for her purple prose (born 1860)
- 20 September – Andrew Claude de la Cherois Crommelin, astronomer (born 1865)

== See also ==
- 1939 in Scotland
- 1939 in Wales
