= 1921 in Northern Ireland =

- Centuries: 20th; 21st
- Decades: 1920s; 1930s; 1940s
- See also: 1921 in the United Kingdom; 1921 in Ireland; Other events of 1921; List of years in Northern Ireland

Events during the year 1921 in Northern Ireland.

== Incumbents ==
- Lord Lieutenant of Ireland - The Viscount French (until 27 April), The Viscount FitzAlan of Derwent (from 27 April)
- Prime Minister - James Craig (from 7 June)

== Events ==
- 3 May – The polity of Northern Ireland is created within the United Kingdom under terms of the Government of Ireland Act 1920.
- 13 May – Irish elections, under terms of the Government of Ireland Act 1920: At close of nomination for elections to the new Parliament of Southern Ireland, all 128 candidates are returned unopposed and deemed elected. All 124 Sinn Féin candidates regard themselves as elected to the Second Dáil.
- 24 May – Irish elections, under terms of the Government of Ireland Act 1920: In the Northern Ireland general election for the new Parliament of Northern Ireland (held by single transferable vote), it is apparent by 29 May that the Unionists have a substantial majority (40 out of 52 seats). The six Sinn Féin members consider themselves elected to sit in the Second Dáil (where five others also hold seats representing Southern Ireland).
- 7 June – The 40 elected Unionist Members of Parliament gather in Belfast City Hall. James Craig is elected as the first Prime Minister of Northern Ireland.
- 22 June – State opening of the first parliament at Belfast City Hall is conducted by George V of the United Kingdom who makes a speech (drafted by Jan Smuts) calling for reconciliation in Ireland.
- 4 July – James Craig refuses to attend a peace conference in Dublin because the invitation by President Éamon de Valera was addressed to him personally instead of to the Prime Minister of Northern Ireland.
- 8 July – At the Peace Conference in the Mansion House, Dublin, President de Valera accepts an invitation to meet the prime minister of the United Kingdom, David Lloyd George, in London.
- 10 July – Bloody Sunday: Clashes between Catholics and Protestants in Belfast result in 16 deaths (23 over the surrounding four-day period) and the destruction of over 200 (mostly Catholic) homes.
- 12 July – Sinn Féin representatives arrive in London for talks.
- 18 July – Ulster Unionist negotiators walk out of the truce talks in London.
- 23 August – The Northern Cabinet agrees that Stormont Castle will be the permanent site of the Northern Houses of Parliament.
- 11 October – The Irish Treaty Conference opens in London.
- 21 November – Troops are sent to restore order after rioting breaks out in East Belfast.
- 22 November – At least ten people die in widespread shootings in Belfast.
- 6 December – Agreement is reached in the Treaty negotiations in London. The main points of the agreement include the creation of an Irish Free State within the Commonwealth, an Oath of Allegiance to the Crown and the ability of the Royal Navy to use certain Free State ports.
- 15 December – Fermanagh County Council refuses to recognise the Parliament of Northern Ireland and pledges allegiance to Dáil Éireann, for which it is dissolved.
- 16 December – The British House of Commons accepts the Articles of Agreement. The House of Lords also votes to accept the Treaty by a large majority.

== Sport ==
=== Football ===
- International

26 February Northern Ireland 0 – 2 Scotland (in Belfast)
9 April Wales 2 - 1 Northern Ireland (in Swansea)
22 October Northern Ireland 1 - 1 England (in Belfast)

- The new Football Association of Ireland then known as the Free State FA is formed in Dublin after a split from the Belfast-based Irish Football Association.
- Irish League

Winners: Glentoran

- Irish Cup

Winners: Glentoran 2 – 0 Glenavon

== Births ==
- 18 February – Brian Faulkner, Baron Faulkner of Downpatrick, sixth and last Prime Minister of Northern Ireland, Ulster Unionist Party MP (died 1977).
- 24 February – Frank Hall, journalist and satirist (died 1995).
- 11 June – Alexander Faris, light music conductor and theme tune composer (died 2015)
- 16 June – Sheila McGibbon, actress (died 1997).
- 25 August – Brian Moore, novelist (died 1999).
- 26 October – George Forrest, Ulster Unionist MP for Mid Ulster (died 1968).
- 9 November – Professor John Dundee, anaesthetist (died 1991).
- 12 November – Billy McKee, Provisional Irish Republican Army leader (died 2019).

== Deaths ==
- 23 October – John Boyd Dunlop, inventor (born 1840)

== See also ==
- The Troubles in Northern Ireland (1920–1922)
- 1921 in Scotland
- 1921 in Wales
