= 1933 in Northern Ireland =

- Centuries: 20th; 21st
- Decades: 1920s; 1930s; 1940s; 1950s
- See also: 1933 in the United Kingdom; 1933 in Ireland; Other events of 1933; List of years in Northern Ireland

Events during the year 1933 in Northern Ireland.

== Incumbents ==
- Governor - The Duke of Abercorn
- Prime Minister - James Craig

== Events ==
- 31 January–7 April - A strike disrupts rail transport in Northern Ireland. The Castlederg and Victoria Bridge Tramway ceases operation permanently.
- 24 May – Silent Valley Reservoir (for Belfast water supply) is officially opened.
- 31 May
  - First regular civil air service from Northern Ireland, to Renfrew.
  - Royal Courts of Justice, Belfast, opened by the Governor of Northern Ireland, James Hamilton, 3rd Duke of Abercorn.
- 18 July – Craigavon Bridge in Derry is officially opened.
- Harry Ferguson assembles a prototype tractor in Belfast.

== Sport ==
=== Football ===
- Irish League

Winners: Belfast Celtic

- Irish Cup

Winners: Glentoran 3 - 1 Distillery

=== GAA ===
- Cavan defeat Tyrone 6–13 to 1–02 to win the Ulster Senior Football Championship.
- Cavan subsequently defeat Galway 2–05 to 1–04 to win the All-Ireland Senior Football Championship, becoming the first county from Ulster to do so.

== Births ==
- 14 February – James Simmons, poet, literary critic and songwriter (died 2001).
- 7 March – Jackie Blanchflower, footballer (died 1998).
- 14 April – Paddy Hopkirk, rally driver (died 2022).
- 15 May – Dick Keith, footballer (died 1967).
- 13 June – Tom King, Baron King of Bridgwater, 8th Secretary of State for Northern Ireland.
- 28 June – Gusty Spence, Ulster Volunteer Force and Progressive Unionist Party figure.
- 5 July – Maurice Leitch, novelist and radio dramatist.
- 5 December – Edward Daly, former Catholic Bishop of Derry.
- Grant "Rusty" Ferguson, Sr., actor in The Blue Lagoon (1949 film) (born in Cookstown).
- Paddy Wilson, SDLP politician (murdered 1973).

== Deaths ==
- January – Bowman Malcolm, railway engineer (born 1854).

== See also ==
- 1933 in Scotland
- 1933 in Wales
