= James McKendry =

Irish artist

James Alexander McKendry (born 30 September 1935) is an Irish artist.

Graduating in 1958 after 5 years study in Ireland and England, he is noted for his large scale commissioned sculptures and murals for churches and public buildings in Ireland and abroad. He designed the 60 foot copper frieze for the Northern Ireland American war memorial, which was unveiled by Queen Elizabeth the Queen Mother in 1962.

In the early 1960s, he became a regular exhibitor with the young contemporaries annual group show in Dublin. Since then he has had several one-man shows and exhibits widely in many group exhibitions in Ireland, England and abroad. In addition, 16 of his paintings have been published for the worldwide market.

For many years James McKendry has lived and worked internationally. He has travelled widely in Asia, Africa and the West Indies on assignment for the European Commission, the Commonwealth Secretariat and the British Council. Now resettled at Bushmills in his native County Antrim, he paints Antrim's rugged coastline.
