= Beacons at Bealtaine =

"Beacons at Bealtaine" is a poem by Irish poet Seamus Heaney which was composed for the EU Enlargement on May 1, 2004. "Bealtaine" is a Gaelic holiday celebrated on this day, marking the beginning of summer.

The poem was read by Heaney at a ceremony for the 25 leaders of the enlarged EU arranged by the Irish EU presidency.
