= Hugh Morrow (footballer) =

English footballer (1930–2020)

Personal information
- Full name: Hugh Morrow
- Date of birth: 9 July 1930
- Place of birth: Larne, Northern Ireland
- Date of death: 27 October 2020 (aged 90)
- Position: Winger

Senior career*
Years	Team	Apps	(Gls)
- Nuneaton Borough
1948–1949	West Bromwich Albion	5	(2)
- Nuneaton Borough
- Lockheed Leamington
1956–1957	Northampton Town	30	(3)
- Kettering Town

Managerial career
- 1967–1971: Tamworth
- * Club domestic league appearances and goals

Hugh "Hughie" Morrow (9 July 1930 – 27 October 2020) was a footballer and manager from Northern Ireland.

He played in the Football League for West Bromwich Albion and Northampton Town, and in non-league football for Nuneaton Borough, Lockheed Leamington and Kettering Town.

== Career honours ==
=== Honours as manager ===
==== Tamworth ====
Winner

- 1968-69 Birmingham Senior Cup

== Managerial statistics ==
Team	From	To	Record							
Team	From	To	P	W	D	L	GF	GA	GD	W%
Tamworth	25 February 1967	20 September 1971	314	183	60	71	753	422	+331	58.3
Total			314	183	60	71	753	422	+331	58.3
