= Mickey Marley =

Michael "Mickey" Marley (died 28 April 2008) was a street entertainer from Belfast, Northern Ireland.

Born in the Markets area of Belfast, but spending most of his life on the Grosvenor Road in the Falls area of West Belfast, Marley was a common sight in Belfast City Centre for over forty years.

Drawn by his horse, Joey, Marley would tour the streets of Belfast with his hobby-horse roundabout. When he retired he sold the roundabout to the Ulster Folk and Transport Museum.

His local fame was enhanced by a recording of the song "Mickey Marley's Roundabout" (written by Belfastman Seamus Robinson) which was a popular children's request on BBC Radio Ulster. BBC Northern Ireland also made a documentary on his life. The 1973 film followed Marley's everyday life, against the backdrop of the heavy British Army presence on the streets of Belfast during the early years of the Troubles. 101

== Lyrics of "Mickey Marley's Roundabout" by Barnbrack ==
Micky Marley had a wee horse
He kept it at the back of the house of course
It wouldn't eat grass and it wouldn't eat hay
But it would eat sugarlumps all day
Micky got wood and wheels for a start
Then he sat down and made a wee cart
He hammered and he hammered and he foutered about
Until he had built a roundabout

Chorus

Round and round and up and down,
Through the streets of Belfast town,
All the children laugh and shout,
"For here comes mickys roundabout"

And then he went from street to street
A penny a time and pick your seat
A hobby horse or a motorcar
Jump on son and hold the bar
The children's faces smile with glee
Laughs and smiles a sight to see
You haven't got a penny and your ma's gone out
You can still get on his roundabout

(Chorus)

But then alas to his dismay
The roundabout was burnt one day
Poor Micky lost everything he had
And all the children were so sad
But his friends they gathered round
From every part of Belfast town
They hammered and they hammered and they fouterd about and built him a brand new roundabout

(Chorus)

Hobby horses don't get old
I'm winter beds they all feel the cold
But Micky knows each winter pass
The roundabout is still at last
No more we'll hear the happy sounds
Of his roundabout in Belfast town
We thank the horse and the wee small man
For the joy they spread across the land

(Chorus) x2
