= Saint Patrick Visitor Centre =

Modern exhibition complex in Northern Ireland

Coordinates: 54.326°N 5.718°W

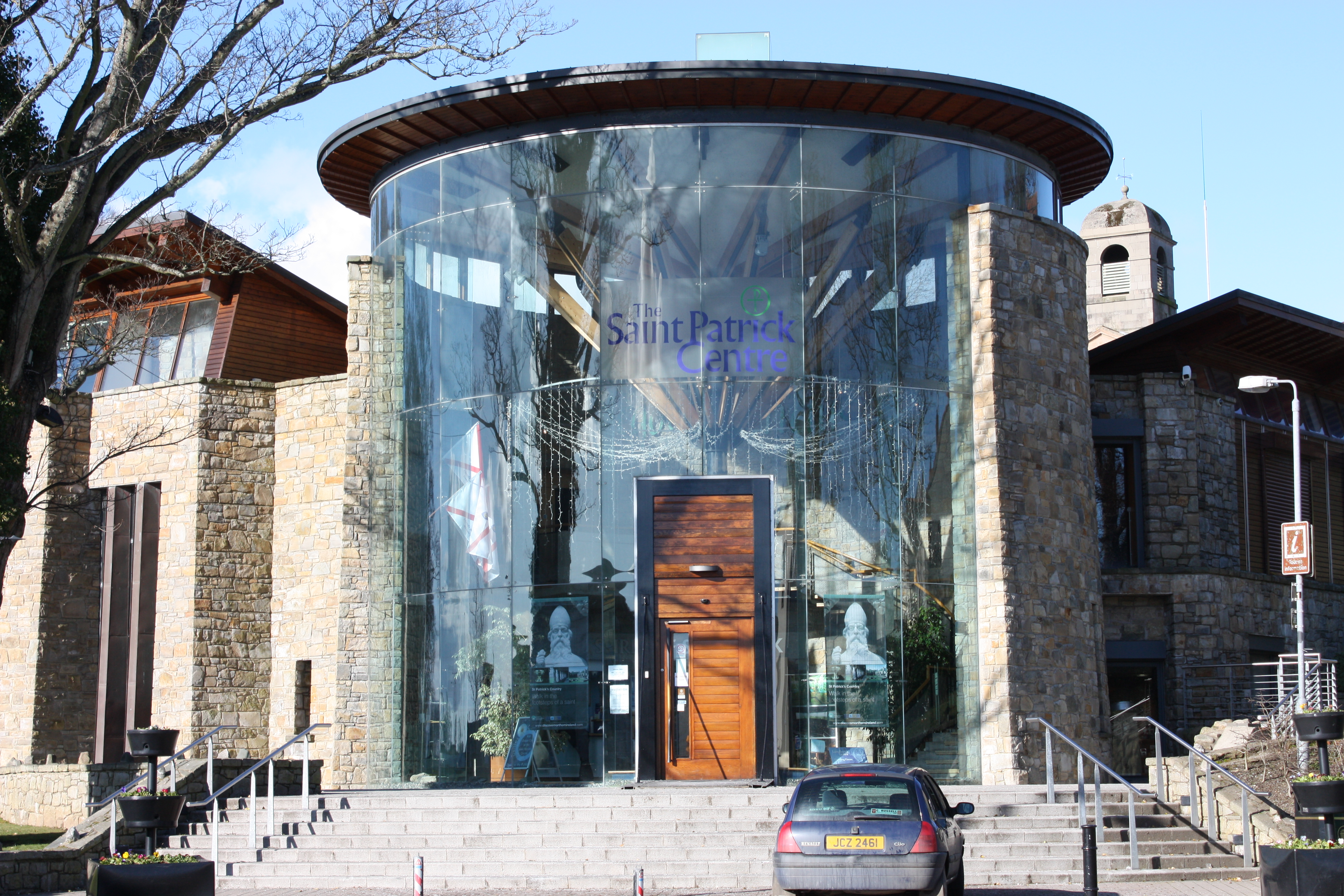
Saint Patrick Visitor Centre, February 2010

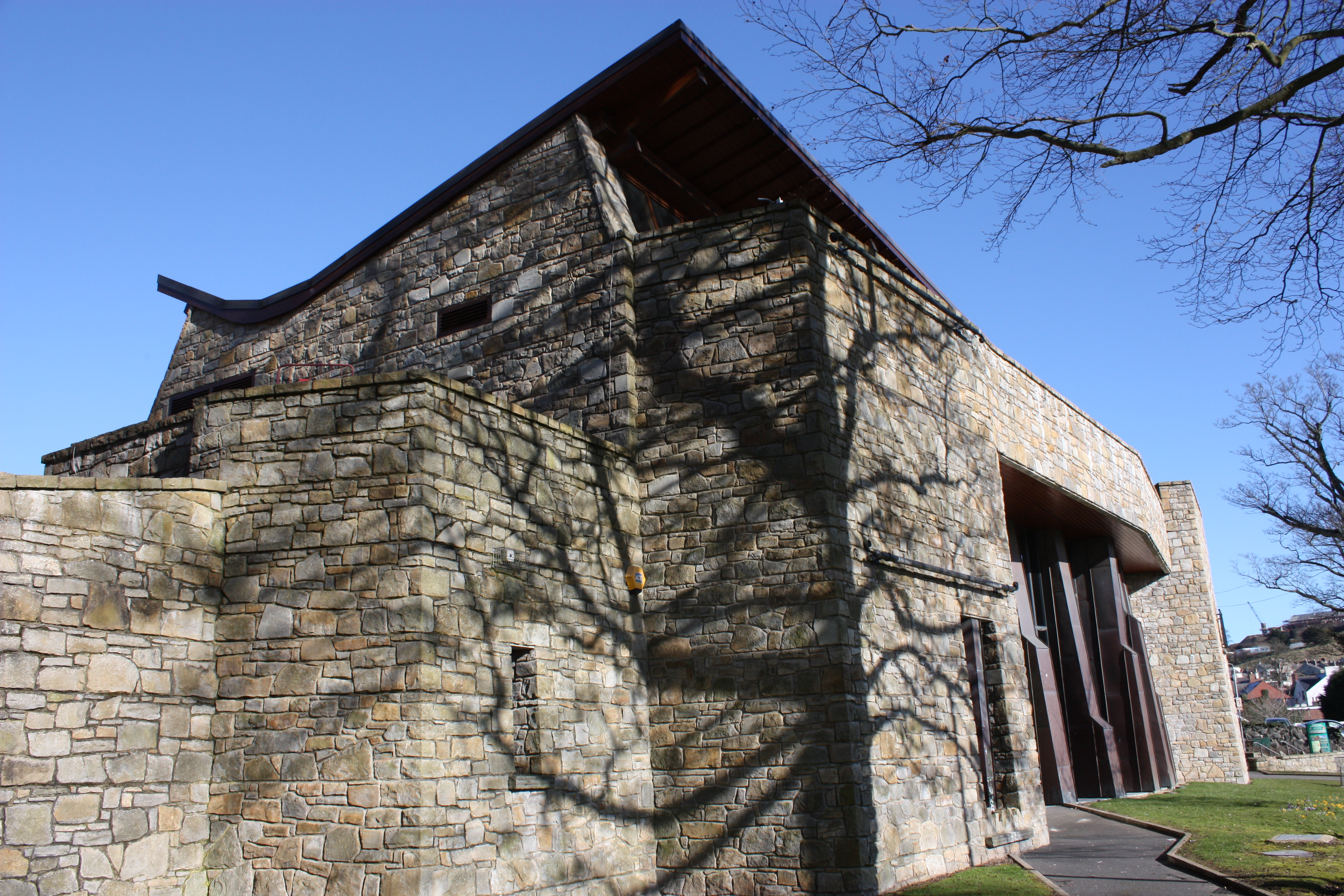
Saint Patrick Visitor Centre, February 2010

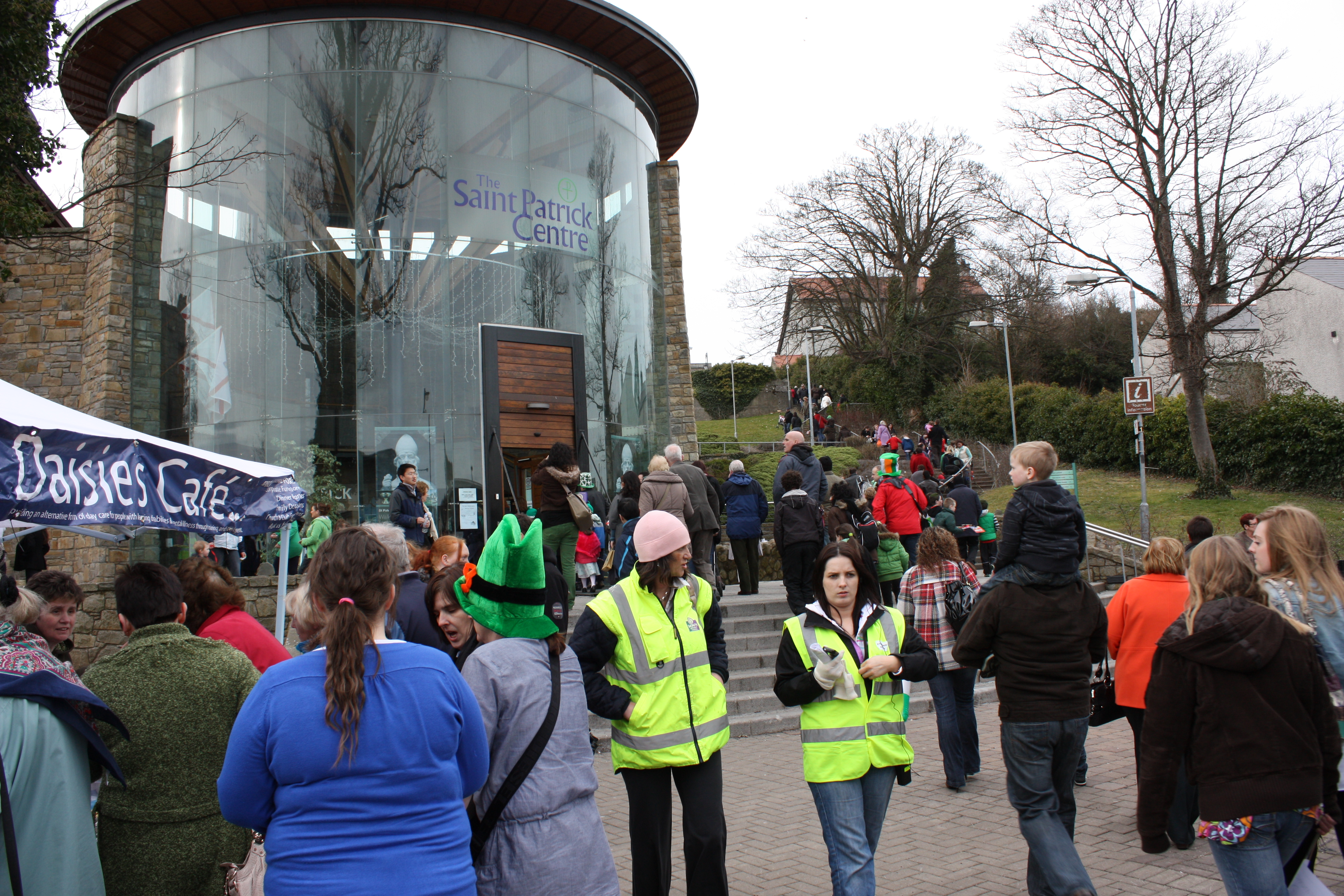
Saint Patrick Visitor Centre, St Patrick's Day, March 2010

The Saint Patrick Visitor Centre is a modern exhibition complex located in Downpatrick, County Down, Northern Ireland. It is a permanent interpretative exhibition centre featuring interactive displays on the life and story of Saint Patrick, the patron saint of Ireland. It provides the only permanent exhibition centre in the world devoted to Saint Patrick.

It is situated in the town centre, below Down Cathedral and the site of Saint Patrick's grave and is open all year round. It was established using Millennium Project funding from the National Lottery, cost £6.3m and opened in 2001. In the exhibition, entitled Ego Patricius, Saint Patrick's own words are used to illuminate the arrival of Christianity in Ireland and its development through his mission. It also reveals the artwork and metalwork which were features of the Early Christian period, as well as the major impact of Irish missionaries in this period in Europe. The exhibition uses a multi-media approach and state-of-the art technology to focus on the historical Saint Patrick and not on the legends, as well as a film shown in the purpose-built cinema. The design involves bold glass walls, life-size figurines, videos and voice recordings.

Apart from the permanent exhibition, the Centre also features a tourist information centre, craft shop, cafe and art gallery. The Centre also has an Education Initiative reaching out to local schools.

The Centre has a cross community ethos of working in the ‘Spirit of Saint Patrick’ and has worked over the years with the Ancient Order of Hibernians, the Department of Foreign Affairs in Dublin and the Ulster-Scots Agency to support studies of local traditions. Support for the Centre has been growing from parents, schools, academics, artists, politicians and people in industry and commerce thanks to the people from a variety of academic disciplines who are presently planning its future. A range of scholars and political leaders from Europe and the United States are committed to supporting the continuing work of the Centre.

Since 2008 a series of North American 501(c)(3) charities, called the Friends of Saint Patrick Centre, have created Chapters to support the work of the Centre in Milwaukee, Minnesota, Arizona, Albany and Toronto. Since that date they have supported the centres’ Young Ambassadors' Programme, which hosts up to twelve American and Canadian university students, coming to learn about the people of Northern Ireland and feedback their discoveries to their families and friends and fellow students back at home.

== Awards ==
The Centre was highly commended in the Information and Communication Category in the 2004 Northern Ireland Tourism Awards and won Tourism Northern Ireland's Most Innovative Business Award in 2022. It has regularly won the CIE Award of Excellence - most recently in 2024-2026 and annually receives an Award of Excellence from Trip Advisor.

== Visitor Numbers ==
The Centre attracted 80,000 visitors in its first two years of operation and in 130,000 in 2018.
