= Given Lyness =

Irish cricketer (born 1937)

Personal information
- Full name: George Edward Given Lyness
- Born: 16 December 1937 (age 88); Dunmurry, Northern Ireland
- Batting: Right-handed
- Bowling: Right-arm off break

Domestic team information
- Years: Team
- 1961: Ireland

Career statistics
Competition	First-class
Matches	1
Runs scored	12
Batting average	6.00
100s/50s	–/–
Top score	9
Balls bowled	229
Wickets	8
Bowling average	11.25
5 wickets in innings	1
10 wickets in match	–
Best bowling	6/39
Catches/stumpings	2/–
- Source: Cricinfo, 1 January 2022

George Edward Given Lyness, usually known as Given Lyness (born 16 December 1937 in Belfast, Northern Ireland) is an Irish former cricketer. A right-handed batsman and off spin bowler, he played three times for the Ireland cricket team in 1961 including one first-class match. He made his debut for Ireland in August 1961, playing against the MCC in a first-class match. The following month, he played twice against Australia in what were his final matches for Ireland, finishing with a record of 13 wickets at an average of 15.69.
