= 1996 in Northern Ireland =

- Centuries: 20th; 21st
- Decades: 1970s; 1980s; 1990s; 2000s; 2010s
- See also: 1996 in the United Kingdom; 1996 in Ireland; Other events of 1996; List of years in Northern Ireland

Events during the year 1996 in Northern Ireland.

== Incumbents ==
- Secretary of State - Patrick Mayhew

== Events ==
- 24 January - The international body proposes six principles of democracy and non-violence ('the Mitchell principles') as conditions for entry to all-party talks in Northern Ireland.
- 9 February - A large Provisional Irish Republican Army bomb explodes in the London Docklands area, near Canary Wharf, injuring around forty, and marking the end of a 17-month IRA ceasefire.
- 17 March - a three year old is killed by the RUC in Dungannon.
- 31 March - Crumlin Road (HM Prison) in Belfast is closed.
- c. April - Northern Ireland Women's Coalition formed.
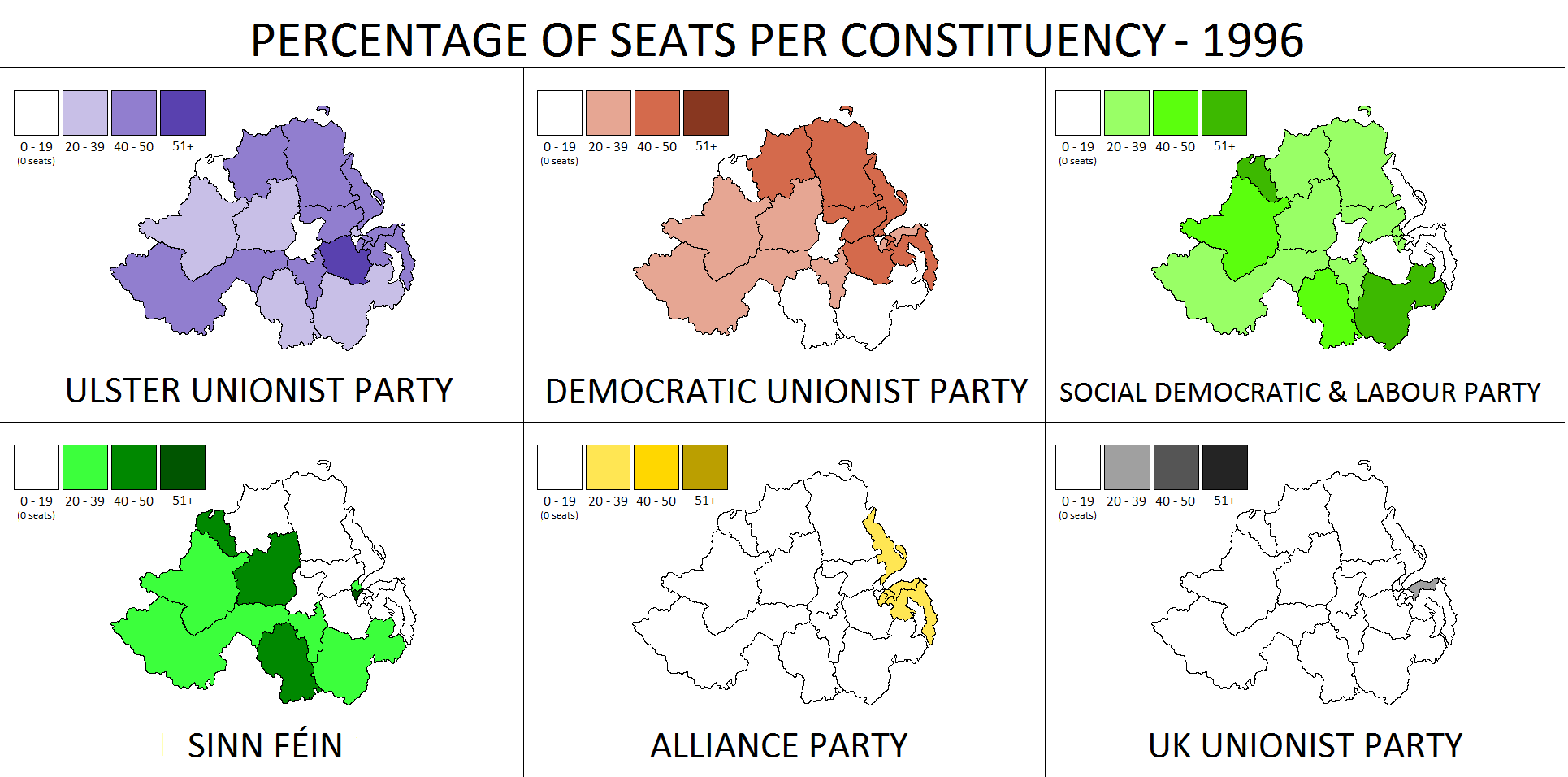
  Northern Ireland Forum seats in 1996.
- 30 May - Elections to the Northern Ireland Forum.
- 7–11 July - Drumcree conflict: A standoff over the annual Orange Order parade at Drumcree leads to rioting here and elsewhere in Northern Ireland. There are two related deaths and around 150 injuries.
- 1 October - Radio station Belfast CityBeat begins broadcasting.
- 7 October - Thiepval barracks bombing: The IRA explodes two car bombs inside the British Army headquarters at Lisburn, killing one soldier and injuring 37 other people.

== Arts and literature ==
- August - Marie Jones' play Stones in His Pockets premieres in Belfast.
- The Hole in the Wall Gang win a Royal Television Society Award for Best Regional Programme for the comedy Two Ceasefires and a Wedding, the 1995 pilot for Give My Head Peace.
- Seamus Deane publishes his novel Reading in the Dark.
- Seamus Heaney publishes his poetry collection The Spirit Level which wins the poetry section of the 1996 Whitbread Awards.
- Deirdre Madden publishes her novel One by One in the Darkness which is shortlisted for the 1997 Orange Prize for Fiction.
- Robert McLiam Wilson publishes his novel Eureka Street.

== Sport ==
=== Football ===
- Irish League

Winners: Portadown

- Irish Cup

Winners: Glentoran 1 - 0 Glenavon

=== Motorcycling ===
- 20 April - Robert Dunlop, after an accident in 1994, returns to race in the Cookstown 100, taking ninth place in the 125cc race won by brother, Joey Dunlop.

== Births ==
- 15 February - Blue Hydrangea (Joshua Cargill), drag queen

== Deaths ==
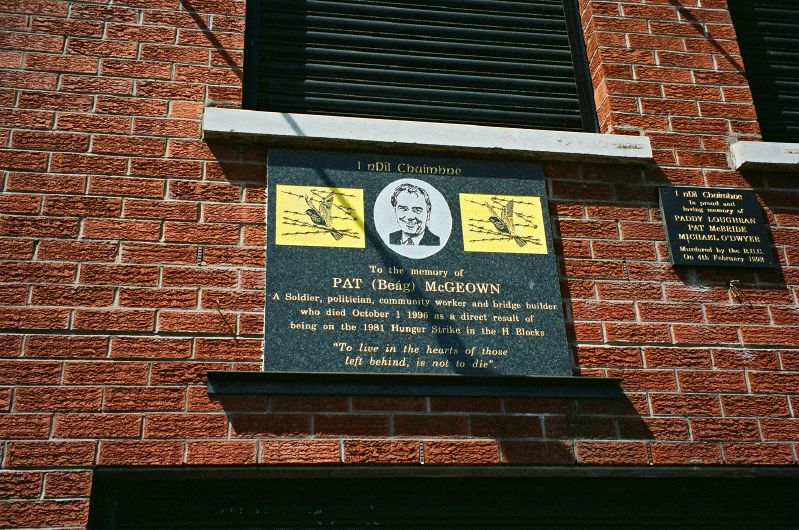
Plaque in memory of Pat McGeown

- 12 February - Bob Shaw, science fiction novelist (born 1931).
- 6 August - Havelock Nelson, composer and pianist (born 1917).
- 1 October - Pat McGeown, volunteer in the Provisional Irish Republican Army, took part in the 1981 Irish hunger strike (born 1956).
- 4 October - Humphrey Atkins, fifth Secretary of State for Northern Ireland.
- 17 December - Ruby Murray, singer (born 1935).

=== Full date unknown ===
- Arthur Armstrong, painter (born 1924).

== See also ==
- 1996 in England
- 1996 in Scotland
- 1996 in Wales
