= 1997 in Northern Ireland =

- Centuries: 20th; 21st
- Decades: 1970s; 1980s; 1990s; 2000s; 2010s
- See also: 1997 in the United Kingdom; 1997 in Ireland; Other events of 1997; List of years in Northern Ireland

Events during the year 1997 in Northern Ireland.

== Incumbents ==
- Secretary of State - Patrick Mayhew (until 3 May), Mo Mowlam (from 3 May)

== Events ==
- March - The first phase of the Forestside Shopping Centre in Belfast opens with a new Sainsbury's store.
- 1 May - 1997 United Kingdom general election.
- 3 July - Taoiseach Bertie Ahern meets Prime Minister Tony Blair for the first time.
- 6–11 July - 1997 nationalist riots in Northern Ireland: There is violence in nationalist areas after an Orange Order parade is allowed down the Garvaghy Road by the Royal Ulster Constabulary in Portadown as part of the Drumcree conflict.
- 20 July - The Provisional Irish Republican Army institutes a second ceasefire.
- 7 October - Substantial all-party talks begin in Northern Ireland.
- 10 October - At a Provisional IRA General Army Convention held at Falcarragh, County Donegal, a majority supports the ceasefire.
- 26 October - Provisional IRA Executive members opposed to the ceasefire including Michael McKevitt and Bernadette Sands McKevitt resign.
- November - Dissident IRA members led by Michael McKevitt meet at a farmhouse in Oldcastle, County Meath, and form a new organisation of Óglaigh na hÉireann, which becomes known as the Real Irish Republican Army.
- 27 December - Loyalist Volunteer Force leader Billy Wright is shot dead in the Maze prison by members of the Irish National Liberation Army.

== Arts and literature ==
- 26 August - U2 play their first Belfast concert in over a decade as part of the PopMart Tour. 40,000 fans attend the concert in Belfast Botanic Gardens.
- Ciarán Carson's The Star Factory is published and wins The Yorkshire Post Book Award (Book of the Year).
- Seamus Deane's first novel, Reading in the Dark (published in 1996), is shortlisted for the Booker Prize and wins the Irish Times International Fiction Prize and the Irish Literature Prize.
- Waterfront Hall concert and conference venue in Belfast is completed.

== Sport ==
=== Football ===
- Irish League

Winners: Crusaders

- Irish Cup

Winners: Glenavon 1 - 0 Cliftonville

- League of Ireland

Winners: Derry City

- FAI Cup

Winners: Shelbourne 2 - 0 Derry City

== Births ==
- SOAK, born Bridie Monds-Watson, singer-songwriter.

== Deaths ==
- 7 January - Patricia McLaughlin, Ulster Unionist Party MP (b.1916).
- 7 March - Geraldine Clinton Little, poet (b.1923).
- 17 April - Chaim Herzog, sixth President of Israel (1983–1993) (b.1918).
- 2 May - Robin Kinahan, Unionist politician and businessman (b.1916).
- 22 July - Vincent Hanna, television journalist (b.1939).
- 22 August - Brendan Smyth, Roman Catholic priest and convicted child sexual abuser (b.1927).
- 4 October - Sheila McGibbon, actress (b.1921).
- 27 December - Billy Wright, leader of the Loyalist Volunteer Force (b.1960; k. in prison).
- 29 December - John Graham, Irish Republican Army activist in 1940s (b.1915).
- Kennedy Lindsay - Vanguard Progressive Unionist Party politician and British Ulster Dominion Party leader (b.1924 in Canada).

== See also ==
- 1997 in England
- 1997 in Scotland
- 1997 in Wales
