= John Erritt =

Michael John Mackey Erritt, CB (15 February 1931, Belfast - 3 October 2002, Lindfield, Sussex) was the Deputy Director of the British Government Statistical Service.

== Education ==
- St Andrew's College, Dublin
- Prince of Wales School, Nairobi
- Queen's University, Belfast (BSc (Econ)).

== Career ==
- Research Officer, Science and Industry Committee, 1953
- Assistant Statistician, Central Statistical Office, 1955
- Statistician: Board of Trade, 1960; H.M. Treasury, 1964; Board of Trade, 1967
- Chief Statistician: Inland Revenue, 1968; Central Statistical Office, 1973; Departments of Industry, Trade and Prices and Consumer Protection, 1975; Ministry of Defence, 1979
- Assistant Under-Secretary of State and Director of Statistics, Ministry of Defence, 1981
- Assistant Director, Central Statistical Office, 1985-1991; Deputy Director, Government Statistical Service, 1989-1991.

He moved from the MoD back to the CSO because Michael Heseltine ordered a reduction in the number of statisticians in the MoD and his post was downgraded.
