= 2002 in Northern Ireland =

- Centuries: 20th; 21st
- Decades: 1980s; 1990s; 2000s; 2010s; 2020s
- See also: 2002 in the United Kingdom; 2002 in Ireland; Other events of 2002; List of years in Northern Ireland

Events during the year 2002 in Northern Ireland.

== Incumbents ==
- First Minister - David Trimble (until 14 October)
- Deputy First Minister - Mark Durkan (until 14 October)
- Secretary of State - John Reid (until October 24), Paul Murphy (from October 24)

== Events ==
- 9 January – Holy Cross dispute: Confrontations outside Holy Cross Primary School, a Roman Catholic girls' school in the largely Protestant Ardoyne district, during the afternoon school run, explode into widespread sectarian rioting which spreads across north Belfast and continues on 10 January, when the school is closed.
- 14 February – Kilkeel fishing boat The Tullaghmurray Lass is lost with all three crew in the Irish Sea.
- February – West Belfast Task Force recommends creation of the Gaeltacht Quarter, Belfast.
- 14 March – Lisburn and Newry are granted city status.
- 5 April – The first recruits of the new Police Service of Northern Ireland graduate.
- May – May 2002 Belfast riots
- 31 May to 3 June – 2002 Short Strand clashes
- 4 October – "Stormontgate": Denis Donaldson, Sinn Féin’s Northern Ireland Assembly group administrator, and two others are arrested for intelligence-gathering.
- 14 October – The Northern Ireland Assembly and the Executive are suspended by order of the Secretary of State.
- Work is completed on the renovation of the Albert Memorial Clock, Belfast.

== Arts and literature ==
- David Park's novel The Big Snow is published.
- Richard Dormer's one-man play Hurricane (based on the life of snooker player Alex Higgins) opens at the Old Museum Arts Centre, Belfast.

== Sport ==
=== Football ===
- Irish League

Winners: Portadown

- Irish Cup

Winners: Linfield 2 – 1 Portadown

- FAI Cup

Winners: Derry City 1 – 0 Shamrock Rovers

=== Gaelic Athletic Association ===
- Ulster Senior Football Championship Final

Armagh 1–14 – 1–10 Donegal

- All-Ireland Senior Football Championship Final

Armagh 1–12 – 0–14 Kerry

=== Golf ===
- Senior British Open Championship held at Royal County Down Golf Club, (winner: Noboru Sugai).
- Graeme McDowell turns professional and wins that season's Volvo Scandinavian Masters.

=== Ice Hockey ===
- Belfast Giants win the Ice Hockey Superleague championship.

== Deaths ==
- 8 January – David McWilliams, singer, songwriter and guitarist (born 1945).
- 26 February – Helen Megaw, crystallographer (born 1907).
- 19 March – David Beers Quinn, historian (born 1909).
- 13 April – Desmond Titterington, racing driver (born 1928).
- 17 May – James Chichester-Clark, Fifth Prime Minister of Northern Ireland (born 1923).
- 28 August – Jim McFadden, ice hockey player (born 1920).
- 3 October – John Erritt, deputy director of the British Government Statistical Service (born 1931).
- 17 October - Derek Bell, harpist and composer (born 1935).

== See also ==
- 2002 in England
- 2002 in Scotland
- 2002 in Wales
