= 2009 in Northern Ireland =

- Centuries: 20th; 21st
- Decades: 1980s; 1990s; 2000s; 2010s; 2020s
- See also: 2009 in the United Kingdom; 2009 in Ireland; Other events of 2009; List of years in Northern Ireland

Events during the year 2009 in Northern Ireland.

== Incumbents ==
- First Minister - Peter Robinson
- Deputy First Minister - Martin McGuiness
- Secretary of State - Shaun Woodward

== Events ==
- 23 January – The seventh plenary meeting of the North/South Ministerial Council is held at the University of Ulster at Magee, Derry.
- 27 January – Environment Minister Sammy Wilson grants the National Trust planning permission for a new visitors' centre at the Giant's Causeway.
- January - 300 lb car bomb, is abandoned outside Castlewellan. It had been destined for the British Army base at Ballykinler. Óglaigh na hÉireann, claimed responsibility for the attack.
- 7 March – 2009 Massereene Barracks shooting: British Army soldiers, Patrick Azimkar (21) and Mark Quinsey (23), are shot dead by the Real Irish Republican Army outside Massereene Barracks, Antrim.
- 9 March – Police Service of Northern Ireland officer, Stephen Paul Carroll (48), is shot dead by the Continuity Irish Republican Army at Lismore Manor, Craigavon, the first PSNI victim since the service's establishment under this name.
- 17 March – First Minister Peter Robinson and deputy First Minister Martin McGuinness have discussions with US President Barack Obama at the White House in Washington, D.C.
- 6 May – Belfast International Airport announces a £10million investment in improving facilities at the airport, to be completed by summer 2010.
- 24 May – Kevin McDaid (49) dies following an assault by loyalists at Somerset Drive, Coleraine.
- 8 June – Sinn Féin's Bairbre de Brún tops the poll in the European Parliamentary election in Northern Ireland. Jim Nicholson of the Ulster Conservatives and Unionists and Diane Dodds of the DUP are also elected.
- 1 July – Robin Newton, a Democratic Unionist Party MLA, is sworn is as a Junior Minister in the Office of the First Minister and deputy First Minister, replacing Jeffrey Donaldson.
- 12 July – The Orange Order holds three "flagship" parades in Banbridge, Bangor and Larne. For the first time, most shops in Belfast city centre were open.
- 12 July – In north Belfast a shot is fired at police by republicans during disturbances following Orange Order parades, two police officers are injured in Belfast and water cannon is used and baton rounds fired to disperse rioters.
- 13–16 August - Belfast Maritime Festival. Belfast is a host port of the Tall Ships Atlantic Challenge.
- 11 October – Irish National Liberation Army (INLA) announces that its armed struggle is over and that it will pursue its objectives through an exclusively peaceful political struggle.
- 21 November – Dissident republicans are blamed for leaving a 400 lb car bomb outside the Policing Board's headquarters in Belfast. It only partially exploded.

== Arts and literature ==
- 16–31 October - 47th Ulster Bank Belfast Festival at Queen's.

== Sport ==
- 1 February – Rory McIlroy claims his first professional golf tournament win at the Dubai Desert Classic.
- 4 – 13 April - Junior and Cadet World Fencing Championships 2009, Belfast.
- 26 July – 2 August - World Dwarf Games 2009, Belfast.
- 26 September – Kris Meeke from Dungannon wins the Intercontinental Rally Challenge title after victory in the Rallye Sanremo in Italy.
- 26 November – Rowing coach Bobby Platt from Coleraine is BBC Sports 2009 Unsung Hero for Northern Ireland.
- 8 December – Kris Meeke is awarded the Autosport Rookie of the Year award.

=== Football ===
- World Cup 2010 Qualifiers

11 February - San Marino 0-3 Northern Ireland
28 March - Northern Ireland 3-2 Poland
1 April - Northern Ireland 1-0 Slovenia
5 September - Poland 1-1 Northern Ireland
9 September - Northern Ireland 0-2 Slovakia
14 October - Czech Republic 0-0 Northern Ireland

Northern Ireland fail to qualify for the FIFA World Cup finishing 4th in their group behind the Czech Republic.

=== GAA ===
19 July - Tyrone defeat Antrim 1-18 to 0-15 to win the Ulster Senior Football Championship 2009.

== Deaths ==
- 1 January – John Morrow, Presbyterian minister and peace activist (born 1931)
- 7 April – Paddy O'Hanlon, barrister and SDLP politician (born 1944)
- 31 December – John Cushnie, gardener and broadcaster (born 1943)
- 31 December – Cardinal Cahal Daly, philosopher, theologian and writer (born 1917)
- 31 December – Helen Lewis, dance teacher and choreographer (born 1916)

== See also ==
- 2009 in England
- 2009 in Scotland
- 2009 in Wales
