= 2006 in Northern Ireland =

- Centuries: 20th; 21st
- Decades: 1980s; 1990s; 2000s; 2010s; 2020s
- See also: 2006 in the United Kingdom; 2006 in Ireland; Other events of 2006; List of years in Northern Ireland

Events during the year 2006 in Northern Ireland.

== Incumbents ==
- First Minister - Suspended
- Deputy First Minister - Suspended
- Secretary of State - Peter Hain

== Events ==
- 30 January – Postal workers entered a 20-day wildcat strike disrupting most of Belfast's delivery service.
- 25 February – Rioting took place in Dublin as Republican protesters organised counter protests to a "Love Ulster" (Unionist) parade in the city, which subsequently became violent.
- 17 March – New Oncology Centre was opened at Belfast City Hospital.
- 15 May – The members of the Northern Ireland Assembly were recalled 3½ years after the assembly was suspended, with a view to electing an executive, and having the suspension lifted.
- 22 May – Belfast City airport was renamed George Best Belfast City Airport on what would have been George Best's 60th birthday.
- 1 July – President Mary McAleese and leading representatives of all political parties in Ireland, north and south, marked the 90th anniversary of the Battle of the Somme at the National War Memorial, Islandbridge.
- 18 July – SS Nomadic (1911) returned to Belfast, where she was built.
- 11 October – Multi-party political talks on Northern Ireland were held in St Andrews, Fife, Scotland, ending on 13 October and resulting in the St Andrews Agreement.
- 18 October – Northern Ireland overtook the Republic of Ireland in the FIFA rankings for the first time.
- 24 November – Loyalist Michael Stone, attempted to bomb the Northern Ireland Assembly on the first day of the 'transitional assembly' following the St Andrews Agreement and when nominations for first and Deputy first minister were due to be made.

== Arts and literature ==
- August – Seamus Heaney suffered a stroke from which he recovered, but it required him to cancel all public engagements for several months.
- 21 October – Renovated and extended Grand Opera House in Belfast was opened.
- 3 November – Queen's University Belfast revealed a severe funding crisis and doubts over the long-term future of the Belfast Festival at Queen's.
- Seamus Heaney's poetry collection District and Circle was published and won the T. S. Eliot Prize.

== Sport ==
=== Athletics ===
- 18 February–19 February – Irish Indoor Athletics Championships, Odyssey Arena, Belfast.
- Northern Ireland competed in the Commonwealth Games claiming two silver medals

=== Football ===
- European Championship Qualifiers

2 September – Northern Ireland 0–3 Iceland
6 September – Northern Ireland 3–2 Spain
7 October – Denmark 0–0 Northern Ireland
11 October – Northern Ireland 1–0 Latvia

- Other International Matches
  - Northern Ireland 1–0 Estonia (1 March)
  - Finland 1–2 Northern Ireland (16 August)
  - Uruguay 1–0 Northern Ireland (21 May) (in United States)
  - Romania 2–0 Northern Ireland (26 May) (in United States)
- Setanta Cup
  - Winners: Drogheda United
- Irish League
  - Winners: Linfield F.C.
- Irish Cup
  - Winners: Linfield 2–1 Glentoran
- FAI Carlsberg Cup
  - Winners: Derry City 4–3 St Patrick's Athletic (after extra time)
- December – George Best Memorial Trust launches a fund-raising drive to raise £200,000 in subscriptions to pay for a life-size bronze sculpture of George Best.

=== Gaelic games ===
  - Christy Ring Cup Winners: Antrim

(Antrim 5–13 : 1–07 Carlow)

  - Nicky Rackard Cup Winners: Derry

(Derry 5–15 : 1–11 Donegal)

=== Golf ===
- Europe win the 2006 Ryder Cup, held in Kildare Golf and Country Club, Straffan, Co. Kildare from 22 to 24 September.
- British Ladies Amateur Golf Championship was held at Royal County Down Golf Club, (winner: Belen Mozo).

=== Ice Hockey ===
- Belfast Giants won the Elite Ice Hockey League championship.

=== Motorcycling ===
- 13 May – North West 200 2006 motor cycle road racing took place. Robert Dunlop won one of the races, the 15th North West 200 win in his career.
- 4 July – Joey Dunlop posthumously awarded an honorary Doctorate of the University (DUniv) from the University of Ulster in Coleraine.
- 9 September – Darran Lindsay, killed while practising for the Killalane road races, near Dublin.

=== Rugby Union ===
- RBS Six Nations Championship
  - Ireland 26–16 Italy
  - France 43–31 Ireland
  - Ireland 31–5 Wales
  - Ireland 15–9 Scotland
  - England 24–28 Ireland

Ireland claimed the triple crown

== Deaths ==
- 5 January – Merlyn Rees 85, third Secretary of State for Northern Ireland.
- 7 January – Alf McMichael, footballer (born 1927).
- 8 January – Tony Banks, Baron Stratford, former Labour Party MP and Minister for Sport (born 1943)
- 4 April – Denis Donaldson, volunteer in the Provisional Irish Republican Army, member of Sinn Féin, exposed in 2005 as an informer (born 1950).
- 11 April – Siobhán O'Hanlon, Sinn Féin official (born 1963).
- 30 April – Billy McComb, magician and comedian (born 1922).
- 22 May – Richard McIlkenny, one of the Birmingham Six.
- 21 June – Denis Faul, monsignor, Northern Ireland civil rights activist, chaplain to prisoners in Maze Prison during 1981 Irish Hunger Strike (born 1932).
- 17 August – Ken Goodall, international rugby player (born 1947).
- 20 August – Bryan Budd, Parachute Regiment Corporal killed on active service in Afghanistan and posthumously awarded the Victoria Cross (born 1977).
- 5 September – Anne Gregg travel writer and TV presenter (born 1940).
- 9 September – Darran Lindsay, motorcycle road racer, killed while practising (born 1971).
- 14 November – John Hallam, actor (born 1941).

== See also ==
- 2006 in England
- 2006 in Scotland
- 2006 in Wales
