= 2008 in Northern Ireland =

- Centuries: 20th; 21st
- Decades: 1980s; 1990s; 2000s; 2010s; 2020s
- See also: 2008 in the United Kingdom; 2008 in Ireland; Other events of 2008; List of years in Northern Ireland

Events during the year 2008 in Northern Ireland.

== Incumbents ==
- First Minister - Ian Paisley (until 5 June), Peter Robinson (from 5 June)
- Deputy First Minister - Martin McGuiness
- Secretary of State - Shaun Woodward

== Events ==
- 4 January – An unforecast blizzard creates havoc across eastern Northern Ireland, with falls of 8 inches in one hour.
- 22 January – Peter Robinson, Minister of Finance, releases the first final budget and programme for government, agreed by the Stormont executive.
- 23 January – The brother of a Real IRA leader is one of two Irish citizens arrested in Lithuania on suspicion of buying firearms and explosives for the Real IRA.
- 28 January – The appointment of four Commissioners Designate for Victims and Survivors is announced: Bertha McDougall, Patricia MacBride, Brendan McAllister and Mike Nesbitt.
- 29 January – Environment Minister, Arlene Foster, refuses developer, Seymour Sweeney, planning permission for a Giant's Causeway visitor centre, reversing her earlier position of "being minded" to approve it.
- 29 January – PSNI Historical Enquiries Team is to reopen files on 124 deaths resulting from fatal shootings by British Army soldiers between 1970 and 1973.
- 1 February – Taoiseach, Bertie Ahern, travels to Ballymena to meet First Minister, Ian Paisley, and open a resort and spa.
- 6 February – Éamon Ó Cuív, Minister for Community, Rural and Gaeltacht Affairs, announces €250,000 grant to allow Orange Lodges to employ a development officer.
- 7 February – Northern Ireland Policing Board decide to appoint a panel of independent experts to carry out a review of the police investigation into the Omagh bombing. Relatives still seek a public inquiry.
- 8 February, Secretary of State, Shaun Woodward reveals that the Bloody Sunday Inquiry is still costing £500,000 a month although it has not held hearings since 2005. The total cost of the Inquiry has reached £181.2m and will not report until the second half of 2008.
- 8 February – Economy Minister, Nigel Dodds, officially opens Invest NI's first office in India, in Mumbai.
- 6 March – Victoria Square, commercial, residential and leisure development in Belfast is opened.
- 7 August – DUP NI Assembly member, Mervyn Storey, who chairs the Assembly education committee, calls for creationism to be taught alongside evolution in schools in Northern Ireland.
- 16 August – Flash floods occurred over all of Northern including Counties Antrim, Down and Armagh. Many rivers were flooded, cutting off traffic to several towns. The newly constructed Broadway Underpass in west Belfast was under 15 ft of flood water. 3/4 of the rain in August fell in a 24-hour period.

== Arts and literature ==
- 8 February – Ulster Bank announces three-year sponsorship worth over £1m for Belfast Festival at Queen's
- 28 April – Björk plays a concert in the Waterfront Hall, Belfast.
- Sam Millar's detective novel Bloodstorm, introducing Belfast private investigator Karl Kane, is published.
- David Park's novel The Truth Commissioner is published.

== Sport ==
=== Athletics ===
- 26 – 27 January – Irish Indoor Athletics Championships, Odyssey Arena, Belfast.
- 5 May – 27th Belfast City Marathon takes place.

=== Football ===
- Internationals

18 January – Nigel Worthington is reappointed as manager of the Northern Ireland International team.

6 February – Northern Ireland 0 – 1 Bulgaria
26 March – Northern Ireland 4 – 1 Georgia
20 August – Scotland 0 – 0 Northern Ireland

- World Cup 2010 Qualifiers

6 September – Slovakia v Northern Ireland
10 September – Northern Ireland v Czech Republic
11 October – Slovenia v Northern Ireland
15 October – Northern Ireland v San Marino

- 29 January – Local developer, Doug Elliott, announces that he will put up the rest of the money required by the George Best Memorial Fund to raise a life-size bronze sculpture of George Best, and would manage delivery of the project.
- 1 June – Prohibition on Sunday football in Northern Ireland lifted.

=== GAA ===
- 20 July – Fermanagh and Armagh draw 1–11 to 2–08 in the final of the Ulster Senior Football Championship 2008.
- 27 July – Armagh defeat Fermanagh 1–11 to 0–08 in the replay.
- 20 September – Tyrone defeat Kerry 1–15 to 0–14 to win the All-Ireland Senior Football Championship 2008.

=== Rugby Union ===
- RBS Six Nations Championship

2 February – Ireland 16 – 11 Italy
9 February – France 26 – 21 Ireland
23 February – Ireland 34-13 Scotland
8 March – Ireland 12–16 Wales
15 March – England 33-10 Ireland

== Deaths ==
- 13 April – Robert Greacen, poet (born 1920).
- 16 May – Robert Dunlop. motorcycle racer (born 1960) (motorcycle crash).
- 16 May – William Blease, Baron Blease, trade unionist and politician (born 1914).
- 19 July – Sarah Conlon, housewife and successful campaigner for the release of the Guildford Four (born 1926).
- 25 August – David Hammond, singer, film-maker and broadcaster (born 1928).

== See also ==
- 2008 in England
- 2008 in Scotland
- 2008 in Wales
