= 2015 in Wales =

- Centuries: 19th; 20th; 21st
- Decades: 1990s; 2000s; 2010s; 2020s
- See also: List of years in Wales; Timeline of Welsh history 2015 in The United Kingdom England Scotland Elsewhere

This article is about the particular significance of the year 2015 to Wales and its people.

== Incumbents ==
- First Minister – Carwyn Jones
- Secretary of State for Wales – David Jones (until 14 July); Stephen Crabb (from 15 July)
- Archbishop of Wales – Barry Morgan, Bishop of Llandaff
- Archdruid of the National Eisteddfod of Wales – Christine James

== Events ==
=== January - June ===
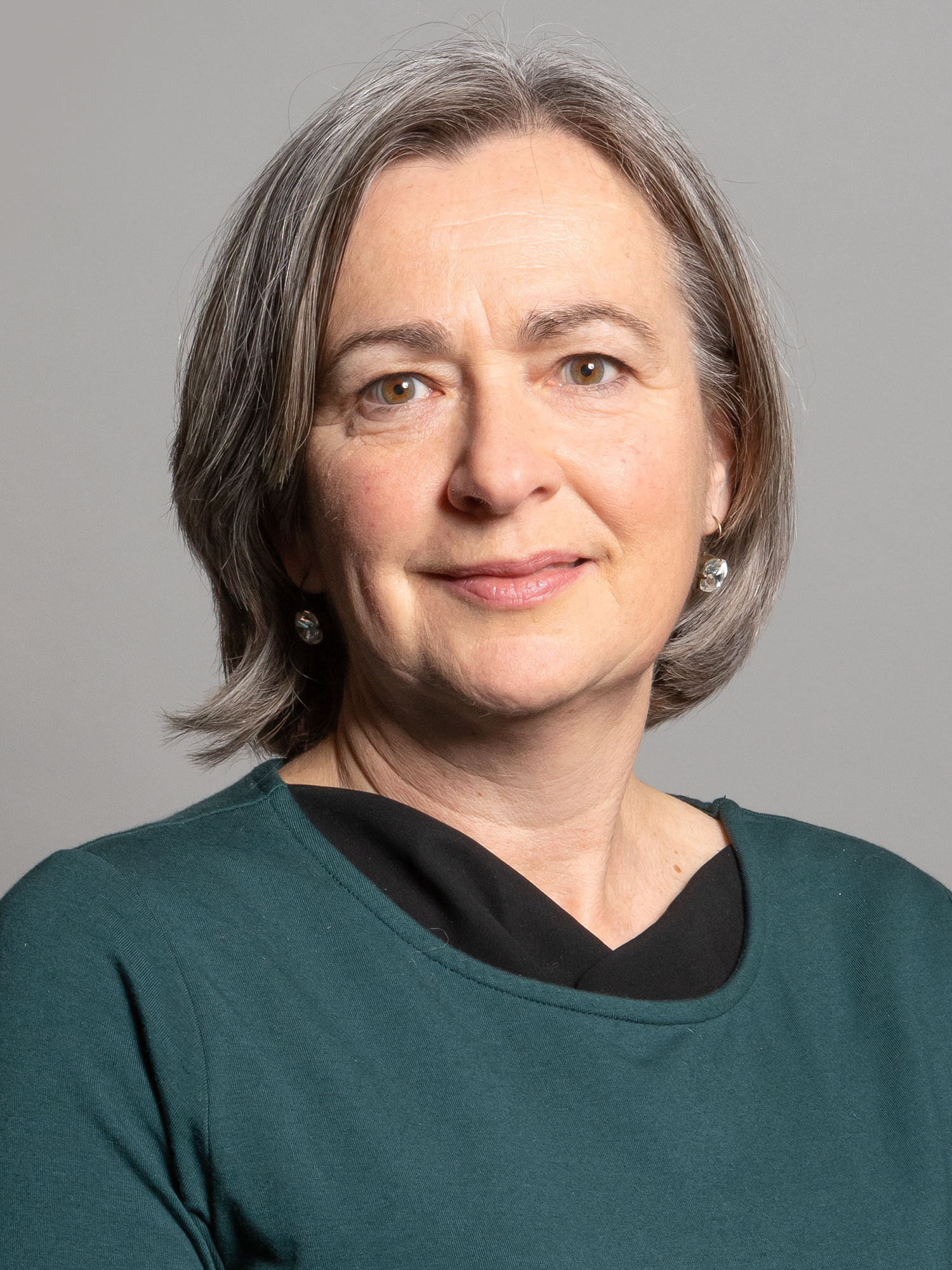
Liz Saville Roberts, Plaid Cymru's first female MP.

- 9 January - strong winds cause damage and disruption in parts of Wales, as trees are blown down, electricity supplies interrupted, and flood warnings issued; three children from Ysgol Gyfun Gwynllyw are injured when a falling tree hits their school bus.
- 31 January – the head of the Police Federation of England and Wales expresses his controversial support for all front-line police officers in England and Wales to be offered Tasers in light of the increased terrorism threat to the UK.
- 4 February – the ferryboat service between Dún Laoghaire in the Republic of Ireland and Holyhead, Anglesey, ends after 204 years; the boat from Dublin Port to Holyhead remains in service.
- 12 February - health minister Mark Drakeford announces a ban on smoking in cars carrying children, with effect from 1 October.
- 26 February - Gwent Police and social services apologise for their failure to prevent three murders carried out by Carl Mills in Cwmbran in September 2012.
- 6 March - seven teenagers are arrested for dangerous driving following an accident on the A470 near Storey Arms, in which four people were killed.
- 18 March - a document confirming Henry Gower's consecration as Bishop of St David's in 1328 goes up for auction at Bonham's, where it is expected to fetch between £4,000 and £6,000.
- 31 March - Plaid Cymru launches its election manifesto in Bangor.
- 1 April - during a televised election debate, Plaid Cymru leader Leanne Wood tells UKIP leader Nigel Farage that he should be ashamed of himself for his comments about HIV patients from overseas.
- 3 May - the Royal Mint announces the issue of a special silver penny to celebrate the birth of Princess Charlotte, daughter of Prince William and Catherine (then Duke and Duchess of Cambridge).
- 8 May - in the United Kingdom general election, the Conservative Party wins three additional seats in Wales:
  - Byron Davies wins Gower from Labour;
  - James Davies wins Vale of Clwyd from Labour;
  - Chris Davies wins Brecon and Radnorshire from the Liberal Democrats;
  - Jo Stevens wins Cardiff Central for Labour from the Liberal Democrats;
  - Liz Saville Roberts becomes Plaid Cymru's first woman MP, when she retains Dwyfor Meirionnydd for the party.
- 12 June - Welsh people recognised in the 2015 Birthday Honours include rugby player Gareth Edwards and composer Karl Jenkins, who receive knighthoods, and singer Michael Ball (CBE).
- 21 June - Nadine Koutcher wins the 2015 BBC Cardiff Singer of the World competition.

=== July - December ===
- 3 July
  - Drift mining is suspended at Aberpergwm, the last substantial coal mine in Wales;
  - The Abolish the Welsh Assembly Party is founded by a Bridgend businessman and former UKIP member.
- 1 August - The National Eisteddfod of Wales kicks off in earnest at Meifod near Welshpool, scheduled to run until 8 August.
- 2 August - Conwy appoints a jester-in-residence, Erwyd le Fol, the town's first official jester since the 13th-century.
- 20-23 August - the annual Green Man Festival is headlined by St Vincent, Super Furry Animals, and Hot Chip.
- 18 November - two workers are killed in an explosion at the Celsa Steel works in Splott.
- 1 December - Wales becomes the first nation in the UK to introduce a scheme for organ donation, whereby adults are regarded as consenting to become donors unless they have opted-out.
- 30 December - power distribution companies report that 1400 homes have suffered prolonged power losses as Storm Frank affects Wales.
- 31 December - Welsh nominees in the New Year Honours list include actress Sian Phillips (DBE), and Falklands War survivor, campaigner and broadcaster Simon Weston (CBE).

== Arts and culture ==
=== Welsh awards ===
- Glyndŵr Award
- National Eisteddfod of Wales: Chair – Hywel Griffiths
- National Eisteddfod of Wales: Crown – Manon Rhys, 'Breuddwyd'
- National Eisteddfod of Wales: Prose Medal – Tony Bianchi
- Gwobr Goffa Daniel Owen: Mari Lisa
- Wales Book of the Year:
  - English language: Patrick McGuinness Other People's Countries (Jonathan Cape)
    - Fiction: Cynan Jones The Dig (Granta)
    - Non-fiction: Patrick McGuinness Other People's Countries (Jonathan Cape)
    - Poetry: Tiffany Atkinson - So Many Moving Parts (Bloodaxe Books)
  - Welsh language: Gareth F. Williams Awst yn Anogia (Gwasg Gwynedd)
    - Fiction: Gareth F. Williams Awst yn Anogia (Gwasg Gwynedd)
    - Non-fiction: Llŷr Gwyn Lewis Rhyw Flodau Rhyfel (Y Lolfa).
    - Poetry: Rhys Iorwerth Un Stribedyn Bach (Gwasg Carreg Gwalch)

=== New books ===
==== English language ====
- Meic Stephens - My Shoulder to the Wheel

==== Welsh language ====
- Zonia Bowen – Dy bobl di fydd fy mhobl i
- Jerry Hunter – Y Fro Dywyll

=== Music ===
==== Awards ====
- Welsh Music Prize – Gwenno, Y Dydd Olaf

==== Albums ====
- Catrin Finch – Tides
- Karl Jenkins – The Healer - A Cantata for St Luke

=== Film ===
- No Manifesto - A Film About Manic Street Preachers
- Under Milk Wood, directed by Kevin Allen

== Sport ==
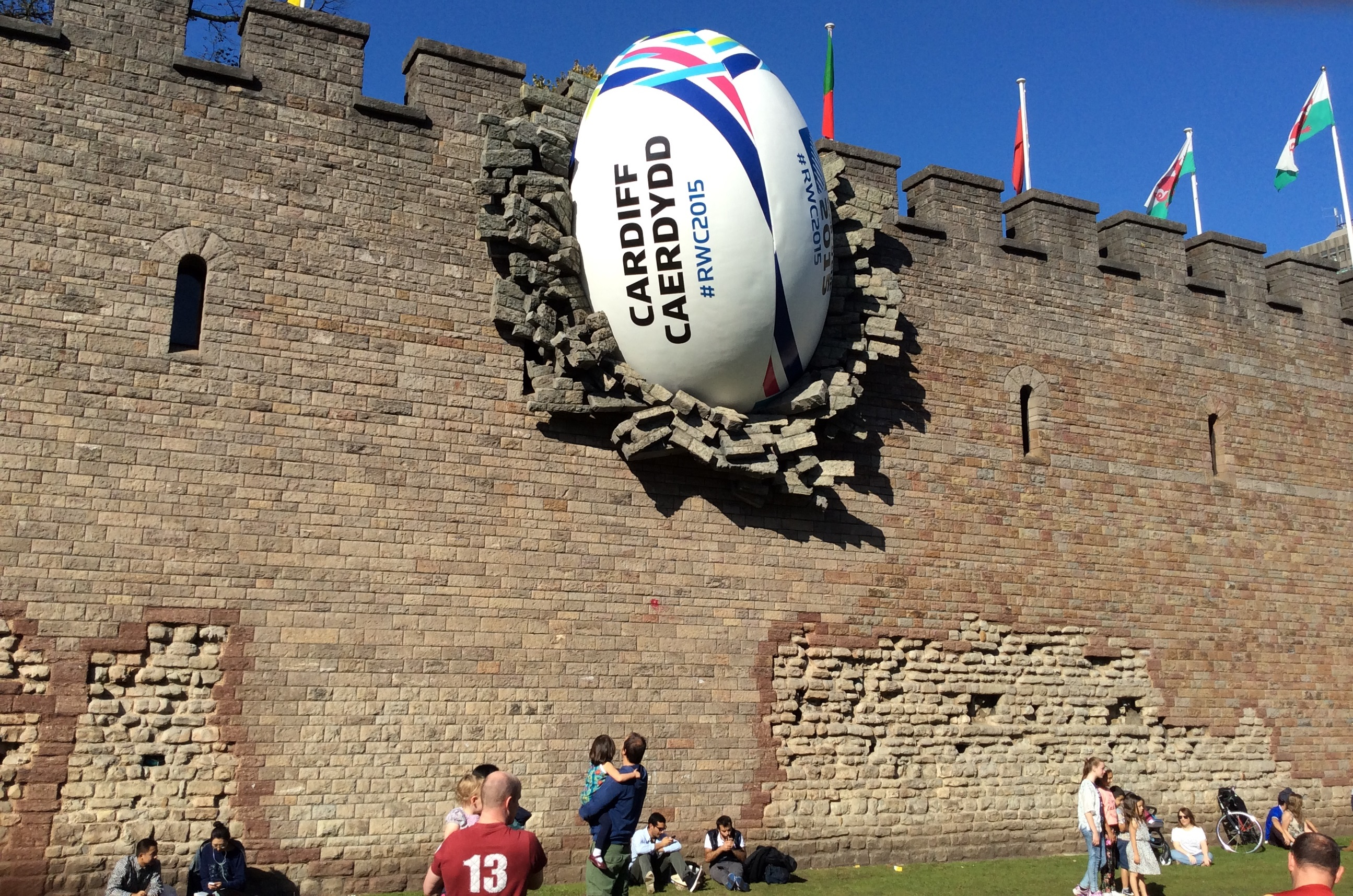
As part of the 2015 Rugby World Cup, Cardiff Castle displays a mock giant rugby ball breaking through its walls.

- Athletics
  - 29 October - Aled Davies wins his second gold medal at the 2015 IPC Athletics World Championships in Doha with a world record throw in the T42 discus to add to his shot put title won on the first day.
- BBC Wales Sports Personality of the Year - Dan Biggar
- Boxing
  - 30 May - Lee Selby becomes IBF Featherweight Champion after beating Russia's Evgeny Gradovich on points in London; Selby becomes the 12th Welshman to hold a world boxing title.
  - 16 August - Joseph Cordina wins lightweight gold at the 2015 European Amateur Boxing Championships in Samokov, Bulgaria.
  - 15 October - in his debut fight in America, Lee Selby makes a successful first defence of his Featherweight Championship title against Mexico's Fernando Montiel.
- Cricket
  - 8 July - the 2015 Ashes series opens at Sophia Gardens in Cardiff.
- Cycling
  - 27 March - Geraint Thomas wins the E3 Harelbeke race and becomes the first Welsh cyclist to win a classic cycle race in 119 years.
  - 13 September - Owain Doull finishes third, the highest ranked British racer, at the 2015 Tour of Britain.
- Football
  - 9 January - Cardiff City F.C.'s owner, Vincent Tan, meets supporters and agrees to a return to the traditional blue playing strip, saying his mother helped him come to the decision.
  - 4 July - Mark Sampson leads the England women's national football team to third place in the 2015 FIFA Women's World Cup, the team's highest finish.
  - 9 July - the Wales national football team are ranked as the 10th best team in the world, surpassing their previous highest ranking of 22nd.
  - 10 October - the Wales national football team qualify for the final tournament of the 2016 European football championship, the team's first qualification for a major tournament finals since 1958.
  - 9 December - Swansea City A.F.C. part company with manager Garry Monk.
- Horse racing
  - 25 April - Welsh jockey Sean Bowen wins the British conditional jockey championship, becoming the first 17-year-old to win the title.
  - 27 December - The Welsh Grand National 2015 is postponed until January 2016 because of continuous heavy rain affecting the Chepstow course.
- Rallying
  - 15 November - Sebastien Ogier wins his third successive Wales Rally GB.
- Rugby league
  - 7 November - Wales win the 2015 European Cup, remaining unbeaten in all three matches of the tournament.
- Rugby union
  - 22 March - Wales finish third in the 2015 Six Nations Championship, in a very close tournament that saw winners Ireland, England and Wales separated by ten points difference.
  - 19 September - the Millennium Stadium hosts Ireland vs. Canada, the stadium's first match as part of the 2015 Rugby World Cup, the only venue to be used outside the host country of England.
  - 17 October - Wales are knocked out of the 2015 Rugby World Cup, losing 23–19 to South Africa in the quarter-finals.
- Snooker
  - John Higgins wins the 2015 Welsh Open; Mark Williams is the highest ranked Welsh player, exiting in the semi-finals.
- Table tennis
  - 14 October – Para table tennis player Rob Davies retains his European title in the final of the 2015 European Open in Denmark.
  - 17 October - Welsh duo, Rob Davies and Tom Matthews take gold in the team para table tennis European Championships.

== Broadcasting ==
=== English-language television ===
- Michael Sheen's Valleys Rebellion
- Patagonia with Huw Edwards

=== Welsh-language television ===
- Dan y Wenallt
- Parch
- Patagonia Huw Edwards

== Births ==
- 2 May – Princess Charlotte, second grandchild of the Prince of Wales (now Charles III)

== Deaths ==
- 8 January – Richard Meade, equestrian, triple Olympic champion, 76
- 12 January – Paul Morgan, Welsh rugby union and rugby league footballer, 40
- 30 January – Howard Norris, Wales and British Lions rugby union footballer, 80
- 12 February – Steve Strange, singer (Visage and Strange Cruise), 55
- 14 February – Maureen Guy, mezzo-soprano, 82
- 16 February – John Davies, historian, 76
- 21 February – Meredydd Evans, professor, musician and television producer, 95
- 23 February
  - John Rowlands, novelist and academic, 76
  - Dave Williams, footballer, 72
- 24 February – Roger Cecil, painter, 72 (date body discovered)
- 6 March – Osi Rhys Osmond, painter and television presenter, 71
- 11 March – Harri Pritchard Jones, author, 81
- 24 March – R. Geraint Gruffydd, Celtic scholar, 86
- 1 May – Jamie Bishop, Glamorgan cricketer, 44
- 3 May – Danny Jones, English rugby league footballer, 29 (heart attack)
- 7 May – Sir Sam Edwards, physicist, 87
- 12 May – Mervyn Burtch, composer, 85
- 18 May – Dewi Bridges, Anglican prelate, Bishop of Swansea and Brecon (1988–1998), 81
- 23 May – Carole Seymour-Jones, writer, 72
- 25 May – Moc Morgan, angler, author and broadcaster, 86
- 7 June – Gwilym Prichard, landscape painter, 84
- 10 July – Roger Rees, actor, 71 (stomach cancer)
- 24 July – Gordon Stuart, Canadian-born portrait painter, 91
- 28 July – Ernie Lewis, international rugby union referee, 91
- 2 August – Ken Jones, Buddhist activist and author, 85
- 5 August – Tony Millington, international footballer, 72
- 15 August – Chris Marustik, international footballer, 54
- 18 August – Beata Brookes, politician, MEP for North Wales (1979–1989), 84
- 12 September – Bryn Merrick, Welsh bassist (The Damned), 56 (cancer)
- 6 October – Trevor Lloyd, rugby union player, 91 (death announced on this date)
- 8 October – Richard Davies, actor, 89
- 10 October – Geoffrey Howe, Baron Howe of Aberavon, politician, Chancellor of the Exchequer (1979–1983), Foreign Secretary (1983–1989), 88
- 19 October – Patricia Kern, operatic mezzo-soprano and voice teacher, 88
- 2 November – Mike Davies, tennis player, 79
- 29 November
  - Wayne Bickerton, record producer and music executive, 74
  - Siân Pari Huws, broadcaster and journalist, 55
- 30 November – Alex Kersey-Brown, rugby player, 73
- 6 December – Mick McLaughlin, footballer, 72
- 17 December – Gareth Mortimer, musician (Racing Cars), 66 (cancer)

== See also ==
- 2015 in England
- 2015 in Scotland
- 2015 in Northern Ireland
