= 2015 in Ireland =

- Centuries: 19th; 20th; 21st
- Decades: 1990s; 2000s; 2010s; 2020s
- See also: 2015 in Northern Ireland; Other events of 2015; List of years in Ireland

Events during the year 2015 in Ireland.

== Incumbents ==
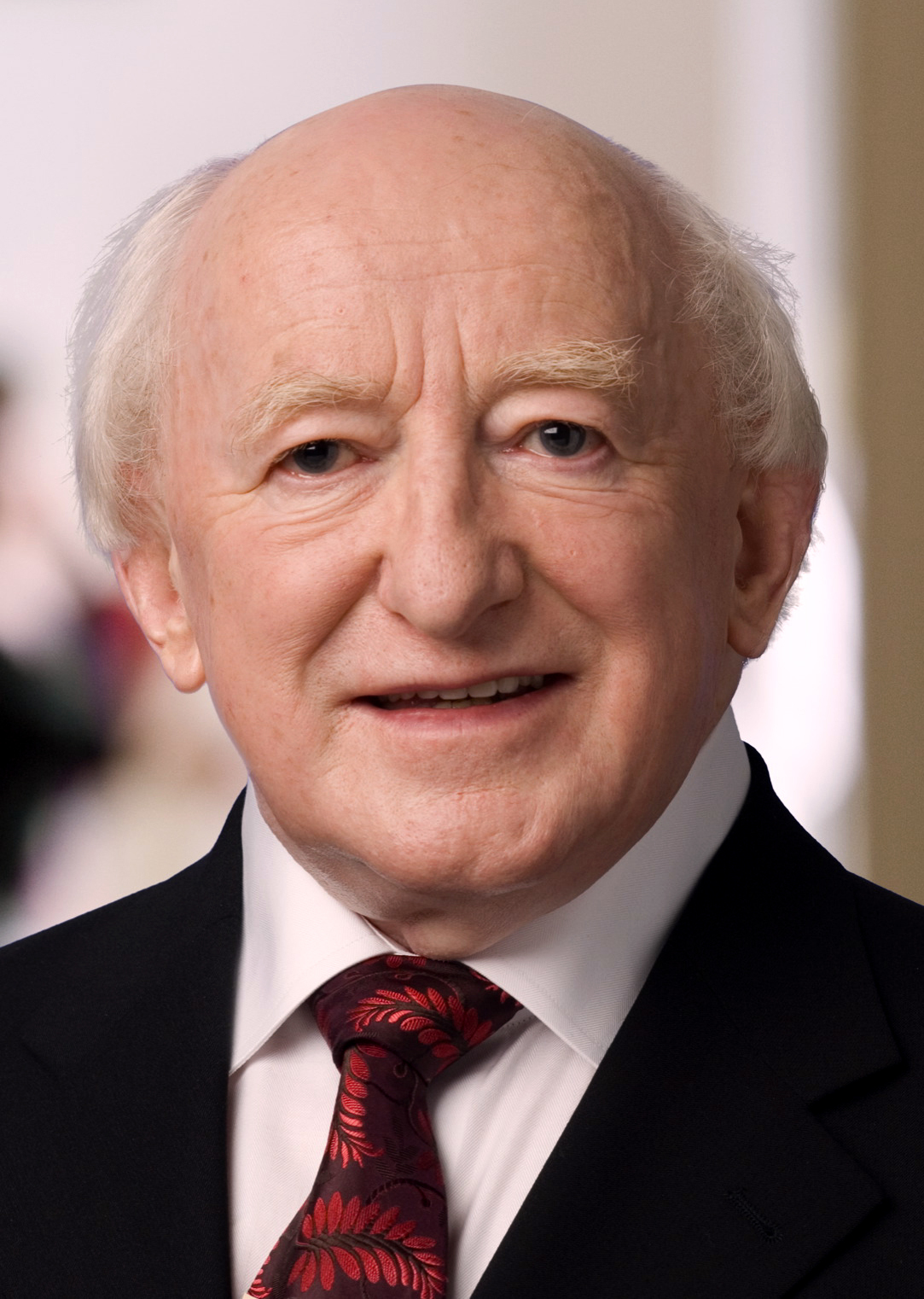
President Michael D. Higgins

- President: Michael D. Higgins
- Taoiseach: Enda Kenny (FG)
- Tánaiste: Joan Burton (Lab)
- Minister for Finance: Michael Noonan (FG)
- Chief Justice: Susan Denham
- Dáil: 31st
- Seanad: 24th

== Events ==
=== January ===
- 12 January – It was reported that defence co-operation between the Irish and British armies is to be formalised and increased in scope when the Irish Minister for Defence and the British defence secretary sign a historic memorandum of understanding at a ceremony in Dublin by the end of January. New developments will include the Irish Army training British soldiers in peacekeeping operations, and surplus British Army equipment being donated to the Irish.
- 18 January – Minister for Health, Leo Varadkar, revealed his homosexuality on radio, thus becoming the first openly gay government minister in Ireland.

=== February ===
- 4 February – The ferryboat service from Dún Laoghaire to Holyhead in Wales ended after 204 years. The boat from Dublin Port to Holyhead remained in service.
- 9 February – The Garda Síochána arrested Paul Murphy, TD, along with three other anti-austerity activists and politicians, leading to public speculation about "political policing".
- 13 February – Former Fianna Fáil minister Pat Carey revealed his homosexuality publicly.
- 17 February – The Irish Times announced the reintroduction of a paywall for its website, beginning on 23 February.

=== March ===
- 3 March – The Government confirmed it would lock away for 75 years any statements it received from victims of child sexual abuse (almost twice the normal length), prompting criticism from survivors.
- 13 March – A new political party, Renua, was launched.
- 26 March – Kathleen Hayes Rollins Snavely became the oldest Irish-born person to have ever lived. She died on 6 July aged 113 years, 140 days.

=== April ===
- 5 April – President Higgins paid an official visit to Turkey, including a trip to Gallipoli.
- 9 April – President Higgins paid an official visit to Lebanon.
- 29 April – The International Astronomical Union honoured Irish composer and harpist Turlough O'Carolan when it assigned the official name Carolan to a 24 kilometre crater on the surface of the planet Mercury. Craters on the planet are named after artists, composers, and writers.

=== May ===
- 6 May – Ireland was circumnavigated by a trimaran with a seven-man crew of Omani, French, and Spanish sailors in a record-breaking 40 hours, 51 minutes, and 57 seconds, breaking the previous round-Ireland sailing record by almost four hours.
- 15 May – Broadcaster and political editor of the TV3 television channel, Ursula Halligan, publicly declared her homosexuality and her support for a 'yes' vote for marriage for homosexuals and lesbians in the Constitutional marriage equality referendum. TV3 was thus obliged for the sake of visible journalistic objectivity to remove her from broadcast coverage of the referendum.
- 19 May – Charles, Prince of Wales and his wife visited the west of Ireland, including Mullaghmore, County Sligo, where his great-uncle, Lord Mountbatten, was murdered by a Provisional Irish Republican Army bomb in 1979.
- 22 May – A referendum was conducted on two amendments to the Constitution of Ireland – the 34th (marriage equality) and the 35th (presidential election voting) amendments. A Carlow–Kilkenny by-election was also held. The 34th Amendment, permitting same-sex marriage in Ireland, was enacted by the Marriage Act 2015 and came into force on 16 November, the first time that a state legalised same-sex marriage through a popular vote.

=== June ===
- 16 June – Five Irish students and one Irish American were killed after an apartment collapsed in California.
- 26 June – Three Irish people died in a terrorist attack in Tunisia.

=== July ===
- 13 July – A new national postcode system called Eircode was inaugurated by the Department of Communications, Energy and Natural Resources.
- 26 July – The celebration of Reek Sunday, the annual climbing of Croagh Patrick, was cancelled because of dangerous weather but hundreds of people ignored warnings by the police, coastguard, and mountain rescue teams not to climb the mountain because rescues would not be possible, and even brought children.

=== September ===
- 23 September – The Prime Minister of India, Narendra Modi, visited Dublin, where he was presented with a hurley and sliotar, and was greeted by a thousand Indian people at a gathering in Ballsbridge.

=== October ===
- 2 October – The postal service, An Post, told the public not to post any mail owing to a staff dispute, then stated that staff might be dismissed if no post arrived for them to sort.
- 10 October – Carrickmines fire: A chip pan fire swept through a halting site in Carrickmines, County Dublin, killing 11 Travellers including five adults, five children, and an unborn child. The Taoiseach Enda Kenny ordered flags to fly at half-mast on the days of the victims' funerals. A letter of condolence from Pope Francis was read to mourners at one funeral for five of the victims. Hundreds of Travellers, including relatives of the victims, had an audience in the Vatican with the Pope on 26 October.
- 11 October – Garda Tony Golden was among two people who died in a shooting in Omeath in County Louth.
- 12 October – The Archbishop of Dublin, Diarmuid Martin told a synod of bishops in Rome that Irish people "struggle to understand abstract moral principles" while remaining capable of understanding that people need to be happy and to belong. He also claimed that the recent debate about same-sex marriage in Ireland was conducted by laypeople in language that belonged to the Roman Catholic Church, concepts he described as "traditionally our language: equality, compassion, respect and tolerance."

=== November ===
- 7 November – The President of Bolivia, Evo Morales, met the President of Ireland, Michael D. Higgins, at Áras an Uachtaráin. Morales was the first South American head of state to visit Ireland.

=== December ===
- Multiple floodings took place across the country during December, causing widespread damage.
- 7–13 December – Heavy rain and strong winds affected the northwest causing bad flooding to Athlone, Carrick-on-Shannon and parts of County Galway.
- 28 December–1 January 2016 – More flooding took place across the country causing serious damage.
- 29 December – The controversial Planning and Development (Amendment) Act 2015 became law.

== Arts and literature ==
- 3 February – Royal Gold Medal of the Royal Institute of British Architects presented to O'Donnell & Tuomey for lifetime achievement.
- 10 April – "The Claddagh Embrace", a large-scale mural by artist Joe Caslin, depicting a same-sex couple embracing, was installed overnight on the side of a building on the corner of Dame Street and South Great George's Street in Dublin. The mural "became a symbol of the pro-marriage-equality campaign side" in the run up to the 2015 Irish constitutional referendum on same-sex marriage which took place on 22 May 2015. "After 19 days, the wind and the rain began to take it (the mural) down".
- April – Lisa McInerney's debut novel The Glorious Heresies published.
- 29 October – Kevin Barry's novel Beatlebone published.

== Sports ==
=== Association football ===
==== International friendly matches ====
- 4 June – Ireland 0–0 Northern Ireland.
- 7 June – Ireland 0–0 England.

==== UEFA Euro 2016 qualifying Group D ====
- 29 March – Ireland 1–1 Poland.
- 13 June – Ireland 1–1 Scotland.
- 4 September – Gibraltar 0–4 Ireland.
- 7 September – Ireland 1–0 Georgia.
- 8 October – Ireland 1–0 Germany.
- 11 October – Poland 2–1 Ireland.

===== UEFA Euro 2016 play-offs =====
- 13 November – Bosnia and Herzegovina 1–1 Ireland.
- 16 November – Ireland 2–0 Bosnia and Herzegovina.

=== Cricket ===
- Ireland participated in the 2015 Cricket World Cup held in Australia and New Zealand.
- 16 February – Ireland v West Indies: Ireland won by 4 wickets.
- 25 February – Ireland v UAE: Ireland won by 2 wickets.
- 3 March – Ireland v South Africa: South Africa won by 201 runs.
- 7 March – Ireland v Zimbabwe: Ireland won by 5 runs.
- 10 March – Ireland v India: India won by 8 wickets.
- 15 March – Ireland v Pakistan: Pakistan won by 7 wickets.

=== Gaelic games ===
2015 All-Ireland Senior Hurling Championship Final

- 6 September – Kilkenny 1–22 – 1–18 Galway

2015 All-Ireland Senior Football Championship Final

- 20 September – Dublin 0–12 – 0–9 Kerry

=== Hockey ===
- 25 October – The Ireland men's national field hockey team qualified for the 2016 Summer Olympics, their first Olympic Games since 1908 (108 years).

== Deaths ==
=== January ===
- 5 January – Harold J. Browne, 92, surgeon, short illness.
- 2 January – Billy O'Neill, 85, sportsman.
- 10 January
  - Maeve Hillery, 90, anaesthetist and the widow of sixth President of Ireland, Patrick Hillery.
  - Jim Hogan, 81, Olympic long-distance runner, European champion (1966).
- 25 January
  - Michael Lambert, 107, Ireland's oldest man.
  - Ronnie O'Reilly, cricket umpire.
- 29 January – Colm Rapple, economist and journalist, short illness.

=== February ===
- 1 February
  - Colum Corless, 93, Galway hurler.
  - Patrick Aidan Heelan, 88, physicist and philosopher of science.
  - Dan Hoare, President of the Cork County Board of the Gaelic Athletic Association, short illness.
- 9 February – Daphne Carroll, 91, actress, short illness.
- 11 February – John Beresford, 8th Marquess of Waterford, 81, aristocrat.
- 12 February – Josie Murray, Leitrim Gaelic footballer, short illness.
- 14 February – Charlie Cahill, President of the Football Association of Ireland.
- 19 February – Frank Prendergast, 81, Labour Party politician.

=== March ===
- 1 March – Tony Reddin, 95, Tipperary hurler, short illness.
- 5 March – Jim McCann, 70, folk musician, throat cancer.
- 9 March
  - Jim Nelson, 76, hurling manager, short illness.
  - Jack Harte, 94, Labour Party Senator.
- 11 March – Tony Fenton, 53, radio presenter and DJ, prostate cancer.
- 13 March – J. J. Henchion, Cork Gaelic footballer.
- 25 March – Tommy Maher, 92, Kilkenny hurling coach.
- 27 March – Claus Dunne, 70, Kilkenny hurler, short illness.

=== April ===
- 1 April – Katherine Delahunt, 58, Circuit Court judge, illness.
- 2 April – George Byrne, 57, journalist and critic, stroke.
- 3 April – Mary O'Leary, 104, one of Ireland's longest-lived women, short illness.
- 9 April – John McNamara, 55, fashion designer, short illness.
- 10 April – Ray Treacy, 68, professional footballer, short illness.
- 13 April – Pat King, 67, former Tyrone Gaelic footballer, short illness.
- 14 April – Dave Billings, 63, Dublin dual player, suddenly.
- 20 April – Fergus O'Rourke, 72, Leitrim Gaelic footballer, short illness.
- 21 April – Jim McCarthy, 90, rugby union player who played for Ireland and the British Lions.
- 23 April – Kathleen Costine-O'Leary, 55, Cork camogie player, long illness.
- 24 April – Shane Mulholland, 27, Fermanagh hurler, road traffic accident.
- 26 April – Jim Cronin, chairman of the Cork County Board and Gaelic games historian, short illness.
- 27 April – Aidan Halligan, 57, doctor, professor of Foetal Maternal Medicine, consultant obstetrician and gynaecologist.
- 30 April – Valentine Lamb, Irish Times journalist and Irish Field editor, long illness.

=== May ===
- 3 May – Bob McDonagh, 91, civil servant and diplomat.
- 5 May – Michael Burns, 54, Cork Gaelic footballer, unexpectedly.
- 11 May – Mick Brady, Offaly Gaelic footballer.
- 13 May – Derek Davis, 67, broadcaster, stroke.
- 14 May – Micheál O'Brien, 91, Meath Gaelic footballer.
- 17 May – Joe Gormley, 79, Derry Gaelic footballer.
- 25 May – Bill O'Herlihy, 76, broadcaster.
- 26 May – Dennis Sheehan, 88, U2 tour manager, heart attack.
- 27 May – Liam Ryan, 79, Limerick hurler and professor of sociology, short illness.
- 28 May – Mickey Galvin, 47, Sligo hurling manager, suicide.
- 29 May – Willie Horgan, 71, former hurling referee, illness.

=== June ===
- 5 June – Paolo Tullio, 65, chef and food critic, short illness.
- 10 June
  - Johnny Fullam, 75, soccer player and record FAI Cup medalist, short illness.
  - Ray Reidy, 78, Tipperary hurler, short illness.
- 11 June – Mary Mulvihill, 55, science journalist and author, short illness.
- 11 June – Gerry Duffy, 84, cricket player.
- 22 June – Jimmy Doyle, 76, Tipperary hurler.
- 24 June
  - John Joe Nerney, 93, Roscommon Gaelic footballer.
  - Reg Treacy, 75, Ireland hockey player and coach, short illness.
- 26 June – Liam Ó Murchú, 86, writer and broadcaster.

=== July ===
- 1 July – Val Doonican, 88, singer and entertainer, short illness.
- 6 July – Kathleen Snavely, 113, longest-lived Irish person of all time.
- 9 July
  - Seán Foran, 84, Offaly Gaelic footballer.
  - Diarmuid Mac an Adhastair, 71, actor, short illness.
- 15 July – Alexis Fitzgerald, 70, Fine Gael TD and senator.
- 21 July – Charlie Cullinane, 72, Cork hurler, accident.
- 30 July – Aaron Devlin, 22, Derry Gaelic footballer, meningitis.

=== August ===
- 9 August – Astaire, 4, Irish-bred British-trained thoroughbred racehorse, colic.
- 24 August – Peter Gatenby, 92, professor of clinical medicine.

=== September ===
- 1 September – Frank Brennan, 67, economist.
- 10 September – Mick Murphy, 81, cyclist, short illness.
- 17 September – Eddie Connolly, 29, Tipperary hurler and Gaelic footballer, brain cancer.
- 24 September
  - Liam Healy, 86, chief executive of Independent Newspapers.
  - Paul Carney, 71, judge.
- 25 September – Pat Dunne, 72, footballer for Everton F.C., Manchester United and Ireland.

=== October ===
- 2 October – Brian Friel, playwright, 86, illness.
- 4 October – Austin Darragh, 88, medical doctor, businessman and broadcaster.
- 5 October
  - John O'Leary, 82, politician, TD for Kerry South (1966–1997).
  - Niall Rudd, 88, classical scholar.
- 11 October – Tony Golden, 36, police officer, shot.
- 19 October – Hugh Cooney, 63, businessman and former chairman of Enterprise Ireland, colon cancer.
- 24 October – Maureen O'Hara, 95, actress (How Green Was My Valley, Miracle on 34th Street, The Quiet Man).
- 28 October – Peter Barrett, 59, Anglican prelate, Bishop of Cashel and Ossory (2002–2006).
- 29 October – Eileen Fox, Terenure woman at the centre of the infamous Bishop and the Nightie scandal in 1966.

=== November ===
- 5 November
  - Lar O'Byrne, 91, footballer (Shamrock Rovers).
  - Joe Ainsworth, 88, Garda Deputy Commissioner.
- 7 November – Seán Egan, 56, chairman of the Rehab Group charity organization, stroke.
- 10 November – Pat Eddery, 63, jockey, eleven-time Champion Jockey, four-time Prix de l'Arc de Triomphe winner, three-time Lester Award and Epsom Derby winner.
- 30 November – Gerry Reynolds, 82, redemptorist priest and Northern Ireland peace process negotiator.

=== December ===
- 5 December – Tomás F. Ó Cofaigh, 92, governor of the Central Bank.
- 10 December – Dermot O'Mahony, 80, Auxiliary Bishop of Dublin (1975-1996).
- 14 December – Johnny Egan, 76, Gaelic footballer (Offaly).
- 17 December – Mick Lynch, 55, frontman of 1980s punk band Stump, cancer.
- 25 December – Eric Philpott, 69, Gaelic footballer (Cork), brain tumour.
- 28 December – Patrick Curtin, 26, Gaelic footballer (Kerry), car accident.
- 31 December
  - Wesley Burrowes, 85, playwright, screenwriter and creator of Glenroe, long illness.
  - Donal Leahy, 77, footballer (Cork Celtic).

== See also ==
- List of Irish films of 2015
- 2015 in Irish television
