= 2016 in Ireland =

- Centuries: 19th; 20th; 21st
- Decades: 1990s; 2000s; 2010s; 2020s
- See also: 2016 in Northern Ireland; Other events of 2016; List of years in Ireland

Events during the year 2016 in Ireland.

== Incumbents ==
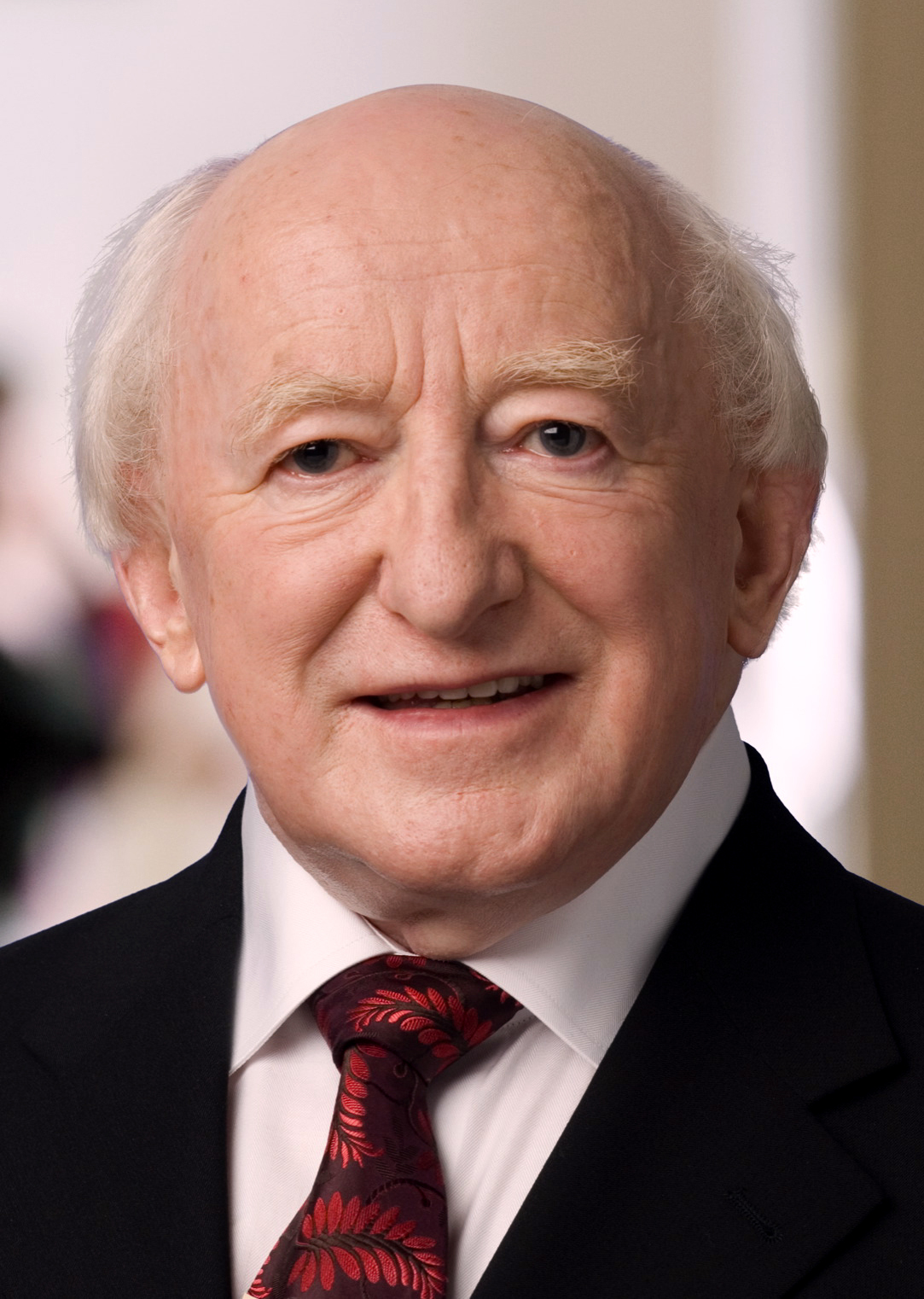
President Michael D. Higgins

- President: Michael D. Higgins
- Taoiseach: Enda Kenny (FG)
- Tánaiste:
  - Joan Burton (Lab) (until 6 May 2016)
  - Frances Fitzgerald (FG) (from 6 May 2016)
- Minister for Finance: Michael Noonan (FG)
- Chief Justice: Susan Denham
- Dáil:
  - 31st (until 3 February 2016)
  - 32nd (from 10 March 2016)
- Seanad:
  - 24th (until 9 February 2016)
  - 25th (from 8 June 2016)

== Events ==
=== Year-long ===
- Memorials and events marking the Centenary of the Easter Rising took place nationwide throughout the year.

=== February ===
- 3 February – Taoiseach Enda Kenny dissolved the 31st Dáil and announced 26 February as the date of a general election.
- 5 February – One man was killed and two were wounded during a shooting at the Regency Hotel in Dublin.
- 8 February – A man was shot dead in a gangland shooting in Dublin.
- 26 February – The 2016 general election was held.

=== March ===
- 10 March – The 32nd Dáil met for the first time. Talks on government formation began and continued until 6 May.
- 20 March – Five family members from Derry died after their car slipped off the pier at Buncrana, County Donegal into Lough Swilly.
- 27 March (Easter Sunday) – The Easter Rising centenary parade took place in Dublin.
- The micro-pocket park of St. Anne's Road Pocket Park in Drumcondra, Dublin was opened

=== May ===
- 6 May – The 32nd Dáil elected a Taoiseach and a new Cabinet was announced.
- 9 May – A gathering of naturists at Curracloe Strand, County Wexford was criticised by the Mayor of Wexford, councillor Ger Carthy. The Irish Naturist Association stated that no-one asked the people to leave.
- 20 May – Brendan Howlin was elected unopposed as leader of the Labour Party, succeeding Joan Burton.

=== June ===
- 13 June – The Ireland football team played their first match, against Sweden, at the Euro 2016 football competition.
- 21 June – The United States Vice President Joe Biden arrived in Ireland for a six-day visit with his brother and sister, daughter, and five grandchildren. His itinerary included visits to his ancestral counties of Louth and Mayo, the Neolithic monument at Newgrange in County Meath, and engagements in Dublin including meeting President Michael D. Higgins and Taoiseach Enda Kenny. Biden visited Ireland a number of times previously in a private capacity.

=== July ===
- 23 July – Carina Fitzpatrick, a female concert-goer at the KnockanStockan music festival, near Ballyknockan, County Wicklow, was arrested for revealing her breasts during the festival in a form of topless protest. The incident opened a conversation over women's bodily autonomy and nudism in Ireland.

=== September ===
- 2 September – The body of Philip Finnegan, missing since 10 August, was found in Rahin Wood, County Kildare.

== Sports ==
=== Association football ===
==== Euro 2016 ====
- 13 June – Ireland 1–1 Sweden.
- 18 June – Belgium 3–0 Ireland.
- 22 June – Italy 0–1 Ireland.

Round of 16

- 26 June – France 2–1 Ireland.

=== Gaelic games ===
2016 All-Ireland Senior Hurling Championship Final

- 4 September – Kilkenny 2–20 – 2-29 Tipperary

2016 All-Ireland Senior Football Championship Final

- 1 October – Dublin 1-15 – 1-14 Mayo (Replay)

=== Horse racing ===
- 18 March – Don Cossack, trained by Gordon Elliott in County Meath, won the 2016 Cheltenham Gold Cup, Europe's most prestigious steeplechase.

=== Rugby union ===
- Ireland finished third, behind England and Wales, in the 2016 Six Nations Championship.
- 5 November – Ireland defeated the New Zealand All Blacks for the first time in 111 years in Chicago on a scoreline of 40–29.

=== Summer Olympics ===
Qualification

- 21 February – Oliver Dingley qualified for the 2016 Summer Olympics, the first Irish diver to do so since 1948 (68 years).
- 17 April – Ellis O'Reilly became the first female gymnast to qualify for an Olympics representing Ireland.
- 22 June – Golfer Rory McIlroy announced his withdrawal from the Olympics.
- 23 June – Golfer Graeme McDowell announced his withdrawal from the Olympics, citing the expected birth of his second child.
- 28 June – Golfer Shane Lowry announced his withdrawal from the Olympics.

Events

- 4 August – The Irish Examiner reported that an Irish male boxer tested positive for a banned substance on the eve of the Olympics. He was later named as Michael O'Reilly. O'Reilly was the first athlete to test positive for drugs at the 2016 Olympics.
- 5 August – On the day of the 2016 Summer Olympics opening ceremony, police in Rio de Janeiro arrested two people for attempted illegal resale of hundreds of tickets allocated to the Olympic Council of Ireland (OCI).
- 7 August – Michael O'Reilly's legal team announced it was to officially appeal the boxer's proposed suspension following a failed drug test.
- 8 August – Boxing captain Paddy Barnes, who medalled at the previous two Olympics, lost his opening bout to a Spaniard in a shock result.
- 9 August – Boxer Michael O'Reilly was ruled out of the Olympics after announcing he was no longer contesting his proposed suspension and admitting to taking a supplement that may have contained a banned substance.
- 14 August – The Irish minister for transport, tourism, and sport, Shane Ross, flew to Rio de Janeiro to meet with OCI president Pat Hickey in a bid to have Hickey permit an independent member be included on the OCI's own inquiry into the ticketing fiasco.
- 15 August – Defending lightweight champion Katie Taylor lost her Olympic crown to a Finn in her opening bout.
- 16 August – Boxer Michael Conlan, a favourite for the gold medal, lost his opening bout to a Russian in contentious circumstances.
- 17 August – OCI president Pat Hickey was arrested naked in a hotel room in Rio de Janeiro and charged with three crimes.
- 18 August – Pat Hickey was photographed being wheeled to prison from a hospital in his pyjamas. As well as resigning as OCI president, Hickey also resigned his membership of the International Olympic Committee, his role as president of the European Olympic Committees, and his role as vice-president of the Association of National Olympic Committees. Meanwhile, Shane Ross returned to Dublin.
- 21 August – The 2016 Summer Olympics concluded, as more IOC officials were sought by Brazilian police and the organisation's former president remained locked up in a Rio de Janeiro jail.

== Arts and literature ==
- 11 March – Jean Martin's The Raped Little Runaway became the first book since 1998 to be banned by the Censorship of Publications Board, being deemed "indecent or obscene" on account of repeated reference to child rape.
- May – Mike McCormack's novel Solar Bones was published by Tramp Press of Dublin; it won this year's Goldsmiths Prize.
- 20 October – Sebastian Barry's novel Days Without End was published; it won this year's Costa Book Awards in the novel and overall categories.
- 3 November – Cecelia Ahern's novel Lyrebird was published.

== Deaths ==
=== January ===
- 3 January – Amby Fogarty, 82, association footballer (Sunderland, Hartlepool United, Cork Celtic and Cork Hibernians).
- 5 January – Gerry O'Malley, 87, Gaelic footballer and hurler (Roscommon).
- 6 January – Christy O'Connor Jnr, 67, golfer.
- 7 January – Patrick Connolly, 88, Attorney General.
- 8 January – Paddy Reid, 91, rugby union player.
- 15 January – P. J. Mara, 73, public affairs consultant and senator, long illness.
- 17 January – Billy Quinn, 80, hurler (Tipperary).
- 19 January – John Corcoran, 56, Gaelic games administrator, heart attack.
- 23 January – Jennifer Guinness, 78, kidnap victim.
- 30 January – Peter Quinn, 90, Gaelic footballer (Mayo).
- 31 January – Terry Wogan, 77, broadcaster, cancer.

=== February ===
- 3 February – Mark Farren, 33, footballer (Derry City F.C.), cancer.
- 15 February – Paul Bannon, 59, footballer (Cork City F.C.).
- 17 February – George Redmond, 92, Dublin county planning manager, short illness.
- 19 February – Din Joe Crowley, 70, Gaelic footballer (Kerry).
- 28 February – Frank Kelly, 77, actor, heart attack.

=== March ===
- 7 March – Adrian Hardiman, 64, Supreme Court judge.
- 10 March – Jim McNamara, 76, athlete.
- 14 March – Davy Walsh, 92, association footballer.
- 15 March
  - Robert Carrickford, 88, actor.
  - Dick Burke, 83, teachta dála (TD), minister for education, and European Commissioner.
- 16 March – Brian Smyth, 91, Gaelic footballer (Meath).
- 19 March – Paddy Philpott, 79, hurler (Cork).
- 24 March – Brendan Sloan, 67, Gaelic footballer (Down).
- 26 March – Paddy O'Brien, 91, Gaelic footballer (Meath).

=== April ===
- 10 April – Michael John Shinnick, 62, Chief Scout of Scouting Ireland.
- 18 April – Sir John Leslie, 4th Baronet, 99, British Army officer, aristocrat and media personality.

=== May ===
- 2 May – Basil Blackshaw, 84, artist.
- 10 May – Jack Boothman, 80, President of the GAA.
- 14 May – Christy O'Connor Snr, 91, professional golfer.
- 17 May – Seán Ardagh, 68, TD, cancer.
- 20 May – Joe McDonagh, 62, Galway hurler and President of the GAA, short illness.

=== June ===
- 10 June
  - John Horgan, 66, hurler (Cork), long illness.
  - Ambrose Hickey, 71, Gaelic footballer (Offaly), short illness.
- 13 June – Tony Byrne, 70, Irish international footballer.
- 25 June – Séamus Power, 86, hurler (Waterford).
- 28 June – Freddie Gilroy, 80, Olympic bronze medal winner.

=== July ===
- 5 July
  - Mick Finucane, 93, Gaelic footballer (Kerry), short illness.
  - Phonsie O'Brien, 86, jockey and racehorse trainer.
- 26 July
  - John Thomas McNamara, 41, jockey, complications following a broken neck.
  - Jerry Molyneaux, 60, hurling coach and Gaelic games administrator.
- 30 July – Paddy Lalor, 90, minister for posts and telegraphs, minister for industry and commerce, government chief whip, member of the European parliament.

=== August ===
- 4 August – Michael Walsh, 50, handball player regarded as the greatest of all time, short illness.
- 8 August – Edward Daly, 82, Roman Catholic priest and author.
- 10 August – John Bennett, 82, hurler (Cork).
- 13 August – Liam Tuohy, 83, association footballer (Shamrock Rovers) and manager.
- 20 August – Louis Stewart, 72, jazz guitarist.
- 26 August – Peter Barry, 88, Fine Gael party politician, short illness.
- 29 August – Anne O'Brien, 60, footballer and coach, short illness.

=== September ===
- 15 September – Greg Maher, 49, Gaelic footballer (Mayo), long illness.
- 25 September – Bertie O'Hanlon, 91, rugby union player.
- 28 September – Seamus Dunne, 86, association footballer.

=== October ===
- 2 October – Bobby Molloy, 80, Fianna Fáil party and Progressive Democrats party TD.
- 16 October
  - Anthony Foley, 42, head coach of Munster Rugby.
  - Mickey Byrne, 93, hurler (Tipperary).
- 18 October – Francis Flood, 86, horse trainer.
- 20 October – Fergus O'Brien, 86, politician.

=== November ===
- 3 November – Maurice Gaffney, 100, barrister.
- 4 November – Khalid Kelly, 48/49, Irish Muslim convert and leader of Al-Muhajiroun in Ireland.
- 15 November – Ray Brady, 79, association footballer.
- 20 November – William Trevor, 88, author.
- 23 November – Joe Lennon, 81, Gaelic footballer (Down).

=== December ===
- 3 December – Willie Casey, 84, Gaelic footballer (Mayo), short illness.
- 7 December – Mick Roche, 73, hurler (Tipperary).
- 10 December – John Montague, 87, poet, complications following surgery.
- 14 December – Gillian Bowler, 64, businesswoman, illness.
- 28 December
  - Anthony Cronin, 88, poet and arts activist.
  - Michel Déon, 97, French novelist who lived and died in Galway
- 29 December – Aodán Mac Póilin, 68, Irish language activist, short illness.

== See also ==
- 2016 in Irish television
