= 2012 in Scotland =

- Centuries: 19th; 20th; 21st
- Decades: 1990s; 2000s; 2010s; 2020s
- See also: List of years in Scotland; Timeline of Scottish history 2012 in: The UK • England • Wales • Elsewhere; Scottish football: 2011–12 • 2012–13; 2012 in Scottish television

Events from the year 2012 in Scotland.

== Incumbents ==
- First Minister and Keeper of the Great Seal – Alex Salmond
- Secretary of State for Scotland – Michael Moore

=== Law officers ===
- Lord Advocate – Frank Mulholland
- Solicitor General for Scotland – Lesley Thomson
- Advocate General for Scotland – Lord Wallace of Tankerness

=== Judiciary ===
- Lord President of the Court of Session and Lord Justice General – Lord Hamilton until 8 June; then Lord Gill
- Lord Justice Clerk – Lord Gill, then Lord Carloway
- Chairman of the Scottish Land Court – Lord McGhie

== Events ==
=== January ===
- 6 January – The Scottish National Party takes control of Clackmannanshire Council after a vote of no confidence in its Labour administration.
- 10 January – The Scottish Government announces that it plans to hold the independence referendum in the autumn of 2014.
- 17 January
  - The Police and Fire Reform (Scotland) Bill is introduced to create unified Scottish police and fire services (Police Scotland and the Scottish Fire and Rescue Service).
  - The Commission on the Consequences of Devolution for the House of Commons is established by the UK Government, with the remit of addressing the West Lothian Question, possibly removing some voting rights from Scottish MPs; it is expected to report in the Spring of 2013.
- 19 January – Offensive Behaviour at Football and Threatening Communications (Scotland) Act 2012 passed. It will be repealed after 6 years,
- 25 January – Scotland's First Minister, Alex Salmond, sets out the question – "Do you agree that Scotland should be an independent country?" – that he intends to ask voters in the 2014 referendum.

=== February ===
- 14 February – Rangers Football Club enters administration.
- 16 February – UK Prime Minister David Cameron has offered to consider more powers for Scotland, in the event of a vote against independence.
- 19 February – Sectarian chants and songs mar the first match Rangers play following the club being put into administration.
- 24 February – Falkirk MP Eric Joyce is charged with three counts of common assault after a disturbance at a House of Commons bar.

=== March ===
- 4 March – Paul McBride QC, Scotland's most senior lawyer, is found dead in a hotel room whilst on a visit to Pakistan.
- 9 March – Falkirk MP Eric Joyce is given a bar ban and a £3,000 fine over his Commons brawl.
- 14 March – Perth is granted city status in the United Kingdom following competition amongst candidate places to mark the Diamond Jubilee of Elizabeth II, becoming the seventh Scottish city at this date.
- 23 March – Diageo ceases production of Johnnie Walker Scotch whisky in Kilmarnock.
- 25 March – Rural Affairs Secretary Richard Lochhead announces that the Scottish Government is moving ahead with its plans for a rural parliament, as outlined in Programme for Scotland 2011–2012.
- 27 March – A gas leak at the Elgin-Franklin fields forces the evacuation of 238 workers.

=== April ===
- 18 April – In a rare move, television cameras are allowed into The High Court in Edinburgh to film the sentencing of David Gilroy for the murder of Suzanne Pilley.

=== May ===
- 1 May – Scotland Bill becomes Scotland Act (2012) after Royal Assent.
- 3 May – Scottish local elections held across all 32 local authorities result in the SNP making 61 gains and winning the largest number of councillors in Scotland, as well as gaining control of Dundee and Angus. Labour makes 48 gains and gains control of West Dunbartonshire and Renfrewshire. The Liberal Democrats lose over half of their councillors allowing the Conservatives, who also lose councillors, to end the day as the third-largest party in local government.
- 19 May – The National Trust for Scotland announce that the first cursing stone to be found in the country, dated to circa 800, has been discovered on Canna.
- 25 May – The Yes Scotland campaign for the 2014 Scottish independence referendum is formally launched.

=== June ===
- 14 June – A proposed company voluntary arrangement to get Rangers F.C. out of administration is rejected meaning the club will now enter liquidation.
- 25 June – The Better Together campaign for a "No" vote in the 2014 Scottish independence referendum is formally launched.

=== July ===
- 4 July – An application by Rangers F.C. to transfer their membership share in the Scottish Premier League to a new company is rejected.

=== October ===
- 1 October – Scotland's Rural College formed by merger of the land based colleges of Barony, Elmwood and Oatridge with the Scottish Agricultural College.
- 15 October – UK Prime Minister David Cameron and Scottish First Minister Alex Salmond sign the Edinburgh Agreement – a deal setting out the terms of a referendum on Scottish independence.

=== Undated ===
- 2012 is the seventeenth-wettest year on record for Scotland, according to the Met Office.

== Sport ==
- 8 January – Mike McEwen of Canada wins the 2012 Mercure Perth Masters event, part of the 2011–12 World Curling Tour.
- 20–22 January: 2012 Glynhill Ladies International at Braehead, part of the 2011–12 World Curling Tour
- 22 January – Greenock-born kicker Lawrence Tynes scores a 31-yard field goal in overtime that wins a place in the Super Bowl final against the New England Patriots in the United States.
- 8 April – Scotland win the silver medal at the 2012 World Men's Curling Championship.
- 18 May – The first all-Edinburgh Scottish Cup final in 106 years is won by Heart of Midlothian F.C.
- 27 May – Dario Franchitti wins his 3rd Indianapolis 500.
- 6 July – Andy Murray makes it to the final of the 2012 Wimbledon Championships – Men's Singles, becoming the first Briton to do so in 74 years. He is defeated at the final two days later by Roger Federer.
- 3 August – Quarter-final of the women's football tournament at the 2012 Summer Olympics, at Hampden Park, Glasgow
- 5 August – In Olympic tennis Andy Murray defeats Roger Federer to win the men's singles final, securing Britain's 16th gold medal in the process.
- 10 September – Andy Murray wins the US Open Tennis Championship, the first British man to win a Grand Slam tournament since 1936.

== Deaths ==
- 2 January – Ian Bargh, composer, (born 1935)
- 4 January – Kerry McGregor, singer-songwriter and actress (born 1974)
- 6 January – Louise Gibson Annand, painter and film-maker (born 1915)
- 9 January – Bill Dickie, president of the Scottish Football Association (born 1929)
- 14 January
  - Janey Buchan, Labour Party Member of the European Parliament for Glasgow 1979–94 (born 1926)
  - Pearse Hutchinson, poet, broadcaster and translator (born 1927)
- 24 January – Moira Milton (née Paterson), golfer (born 1923)
- 26 January – Alex Eadie, Labour MP for Midlothian (born 1920)
- 14 February – Tom McAnearney, football player and manager (born 1933)
- 27 February – Thomas Watter, last surviving Scottish volunteer in the Spanish Civil War (age 99)
- 4 March – Paul McBride, criminal lawyer (born 1964)
- 21 March – Derick Thomson, Gaelic scholar and poet (born 1921)
- 24 March – Jocky Wilson, darts player (born 1950)
- 6 April – Larry Canning, footballer (born 1925)
- 7 April – Alexander Leslie-Melville, 14th Earl of Leven, soldier, councillor, Lord Lieutenant of Nairn (1969–99) and president of the British Ski and Snowboard Federation (born 1924)
- 28 April – Tom Spence, football player and manager (born 1962)
- 15 May – George Wyllie, artist (born 1921)
- 30 September – Bobby Hogg, last native speaker of the Cromarty dialect of North Northern Scots (born c.1920)
- 24 November – Ian Campbell, folk singer (born 1933)

== The arts ==
- 22 June – Brave, a 3D computer-animated fantasy adventure film set in Scotland, is released.
- 6–8 July – T in the Park 2012, a music festival at Balado.
- September – Kathleen Jamie's collection The Overhaul is published; it wins the Poetry prize in the 2012 Costa Book Awards.
- 23 October – Skyfall, a James Bond film with finale set in Scotland, premières.
- 21 December – World War Z, a post-apocalyptic horror film partly shot in Scotland, is released.
- Peter Maxwell Davies composes the piano piece A Postcard from Sanday.

== See also ==
- 2012 in England
- 2012 in Northern Ireland
- 2012 in Wales
