= 2012 in England =

- Centuries: 19th; 20th; 21st
- Decades: 1990s; 2000s; 2010s; 2020s
- See also: 2011–12 in English football 2012–13 in English football 2012 in the United Kingdom; Other events of 2012

Events from 2012 in England

== Incumbent ==
- Monarch - Elizabeth II
- Prime Minister - David Cameron

== Events ==
=== January ===
- 3 January – After a trial based on new forensic evidence, two men are convicted of the racist murder of black London teenager Stephen Lawrence, 18 years after the attack.
- 23 January – John Anslow, a prisoner charged with murder following a fatal shooting in 2010 escapes from the van transporting him to a court appearance following an armed ambush near Bromsgrove, Worcestershire.
- 26 January – The death rate from heart attacks in England has halved in the last decade, says an Oxford University study.

=== February ===
- 8 February – England football manager Fabio Capello announces his immediate resignation from the role after four years in charge.
- 14 February – Thirteen-year-old Casey-Lyanne Kearney stabbed to death in a park in Doncaster.

=== March ===
- 40 people die in car crash.

=== April ===
- 4 April – As many as 50,000 homes in northern England are hit by a power blackout after heavy winds, snow and ice bring down electricity cables.
- 6 April – A ban on the display of tobacco products by retailers comes into force in England in a bid to reduce the number of young people taking up smoking.

=== May ===
- 3 May – Local elections held in England.
- 4 May
  - Local elections result in Labour making gains and winning the largest number of councillors in contested seats in England.
  - Boris Johnson is re-elected as Mayor of London with 51.5% of the vote. Ken Livingstone subsequently says it would be his "last election". In the London Assembly, Labour becomes the party with the greatest number of seats, with minor losses for the Conservatives and Liberal Democrats. The British National Party loses their only seat. Of 25 seats, the final tally stands at: Labour 12, Conservatives 9, Liberal Democrats 2, Green 2.
- 11 May – Five children die in the Allenton house fire, a sixth later dies in hospital. The parents of the children are later charged with their murders.

=== June ===
- 6 June – Bristol woman Claire Holland disappears from a pub in Bristol city centre.
- 24 June – England lose by a penalty shoot-out in the Euro 2012 tournament, with former West Ham player Alessandro Diamanti converting from the spot at the Olimpiyskiy National Sports Complex in Kyiv to take Italy through to the semi-final against Germany.

=== July ===
- 5 July – The Shard, the tallest building in Europe and the tallest habitable free-standing structure in the UK at 309.6 metres (1,016 ft), is officially opened.
- 27 July – London hosts the 2012 Summer Olympics, beginning with an opening ceremony, and making it the first city to host the Games for a third time. The closing ceremony is on 12 August.

== Deaths ==
- 4 February – Florence Green, supercentenarian and last-surviving World War I service veteran (b. 1901)
- 5 February – Ray Honeyford, 77, headmaster and writer (b. 1934)

== See also ==
- 2012 in Northern Ireland
- 2012 in Scotland
- 2012 in Wales
