= 2015 in England =

- Centuries: 19th; 20th; 21st
- Decades: 1990s; 2000s; 2010s; 2020s
- See also: 2014–15 in English football 2015–16 in English football 2015 in the United Kingdom; Other events of 2015

Events from 2015 in England

== Incumbent ==
- Monarch - Elizabeth II
- Prime Minister - David Cameron

== Events ==
=== January ===
- 4 January – The Höegh Osaka, a Singaporean cargo ship transporting luxury cars, runs aground near the Isle of Wight after it started listing shortly after leaving the Port of Southampton. An investigation is launched.
- 6 January – Figures from the last three months show that England's A&E waiting time performance has dropped to its worst levels for a decade.
- 9 January – Circle Holdings, the first private company to operate an NHS hospital, announces plans to withdraw from its contract to run Hinchingbrooke Hospital because it believes the franchise is "no longer viable under current terms".
- 12 January – 19-year-old Lewis Daynes who murdered 14-year-old Breck Bednar after meeting him online in February 2014, is sentenced to life in prison.
- 15 January – A set of council offices, a funeral parlour, and a thatched cottage are extensively damaged after they are set ablaze due to a spate of arson attacks in South Oxfordshire. A suspect is arrested.
- 17 January – Andrew Main, 47, of Rokemarsh, Roke, Wallingford, faces arson charges, one of which is intent to endanger life after spate of fires in Oxfordshire. A fire on lorry forces channel tunnel to be closed in both directions.
- 28 January – An earthquake of magnitude 3.8 is felt across the East Midlands.
- 31 January – The head of the Police Federation of England and Wales expresses his controversial support for all front-line police officers in England and Wales to be offered Tasers in light of the increased terrorism threat to the UK.

=== February ===
- 2 February – London's population hits a record high of 8.6m and is forecast to reach 11m by 2050.
- 4 February – The entire cabinet of Rotherham Borough Council announces its intention to resign from office after a report into the Rotherham child sexual exploitation scandal concludes the council's handling of the scandal was "not fit for purpose".

=== March ===
- 4 March – The stepbrother of 16-year-old Becky Watts, a schoolgirl reported missing two weeks previously, is charged with her murder after body parts are found at a house in Barton Hill, Bristol.

=== July ===
- 27 July – Members of the Norwich sexual abuse ring are found guilty of the sexual abuse of children, with the crimes spanning a decade. Ringleader Marie Black is convicted of 23 counts of sex abuse, including rape.

=== September ===
- 28 September – Members of a Norwich sexual abuse ring are jailed for "utterly depraved" sex abuse of children over a period of ten years. Ringleader Marie Black received the longest sentence of life imprisonment, with a minimum term of 24 years.

=== November ===
- 11 November – The stepbrother of murdered teenager Becky Watts, Nathan Matthews is found guilty of her murder and his girlfriend, Shauna Hoare, found guilty of Becky Watts' manslaughter.
- 13 November – Justice Dingemans sentenced Nathan Matthews to life imprisonment with a minimum of 33 years for the murder of his stepsister Becky Watts, and his girlfriend Shauna Hoare was sentenced to 17 years imprisonment for manslaughter.

== Deaths ==
- 26 June – Denis Thwaites, 70, footballer (Birmingham City), victim of the 2015 Sousse attacks.
- 19 December – Greville Janner, Labour MP and lawyer (b. 1928)

== See also ==
- 2015 in Northern Ireland
- 2015 in Scotland
- 2015 in Wales
