= List of Irish films of 2015 =

The Irish film industry produced over fifty feature films in 2015. This article fully lists all non-pornographic films, including short films, that had a release date in that year and which were at least partly made by the Republic of Ireland. It does not include films first released in previous years that had release dates in 2015. Nor does it include films made by Northern Ireland, which are included in List of British films of 2015.

== Major releases ==
Release date	Title	Cast and Crew	Studio	Genre(s)	Ref.
January 1	Brooklyn	Director: John Crowley; Cast: Saoirse Ronan, Emory Cohen, Domhnall Gleeson, Jim Broadbent, Julie Walters	Lionsgate	Romance; Drama	
May 15	Absolution	Director: Keoni Waxman; Cast: Steven Seagal, Byron Mann, Vinnie Jones, Josh Barnett, Adina Stetcu, Massimo Dobrovic	Lionsgate Entertainment	Action; Crime	
July 7	My Name Is Emily	Director: Simon Fitzmaurice; Cast: Evanna Lynch, George Webster, Michael Smiley	Eclipse Pictures	Drama	
September 9	11 Minutes	Director: Jerzy Skolimowski; Cast: Richard Dormer, Wojciech Mecwaldowski, Andrzej Chyra, Dawid Ogrodnik, Paulina Chapko, Mateusz Kościukiewicz, Agata Buzek	Skopia Film, Element Pictures	Drama	
November 13	Night People	Director: Gerard Lough; Cast: Jack Dean Shepherd, Michael Parle, Clare Blennerhassett	Rogue Frame Films	Horror / Science Fiction	

== See also ==
- 2015 in film
- 2015 in Ireland
- Cinema of Ireland
- List of Irish submissions for the Academy Award for Best Foreign Language Film
