= 2014 in Northern Ireland =

- Centuries: 20th; 21st
- Decades: 1990s; 2000s; 2010s; 2020s
- See also: 2014 in the United Kingdom; 2014 in Ireland; Other events of 2014; List of years in Northern Ireland

Events during the year 2014 in Northern Ireland.

== Incumbents ==
- First Minister - Peter Robinson
- Deputy First Minister - Martin McGuiness
- Secretary of State - Theresa Villiers

== Events ==
=== January ===
- 1 January – New Year's Day (public holiday).
- 24 January – Amnesty Northern Ireland condemned as "utterly unjustified" and an "interference with freedom of speech and artistic expression" the cancellation of a comedy play by the Reduced Shakespeare Company called The Bible: The Complete Word Of God (Abridged) due to be performed in the Theatre at the Mill in Newtownabbey because of blasphemy alleged by the borough council led by the Democratic Unionist Party.

=== February ===
- 12 February – A Police Service of Northern Ireland vehicle crossed the border into County Donegal, leading to a Police Service investigation.

=== March ===
- 17 March – Saint Patrick's Day (public holiday).
- 30 March – Mothering Sunday. Clocks went forward one hour when British Summer Time (BST) began.

=== April ===
- 18 April – Good Friday (public holiday).
- 21 April – Easter Monday (public holiday).
- 30 April – Sinn Féin leader Gerry Adams was arrested and questioned by serious crime detectives at Antrim police station about the murder of Jean McConville in 1972.

=== May ===
- 4 May – Gerry Adams was released without charge after four days in police custody. It was decided to send a file to the Public Prosecution Service, which would decide if criminal charges should be brought.
- 5 May – May Day and Labour Day (public holiday).
- 9 May – The Giro d'Italia cycle race started in Belfast.
- 26 May – Spring public holiday.

=== June ===
- 15 June – Father's Day.

=== July ===
- 1 July – A Ku Klux Klan flag was taken down from a lamppost in Ballymacarrett in East Belfast. Its erection was condemned by politicians from a variety of political parties.
- 12 July – Orangeman's Day (public holiday). Marching season culminates in The Twelfth celebration of the Glorious Revolution and the Battle of the Boyne.

=== August ===
- 25 August – August public holiday.

=== October ===
- 26 October – Clocks go back one hour when British Summer Time (BST) ends.
- 31 October – Hallowe'en.

=== December ===
- 23 December - David Cameron agreed to a subsidy of £2 billion to help preserve local welfare budgets. President Barack Obama congratulated ' ..all the leaders involved who, once again, have shown that when there is a will and the courage to overcome the issues that have divided the people of Northern Ireland, there is a way to succeed for the benefit of all. '
- 25 December – Christmas Day (public holiday).
- 26 December – Boxing Day (public holiday).

== Sports ==
=== Association football ===
- January – Football League Cup final.

== Deaths ==
- 12 May — Hugh Smyth, 73, Lord Mayor of Belfast
- 12 September — Ian Paisley, former First Minister and founder of the DUP

== See also ==
- 2014 in England
- 2014 in Scotland
- 2014 in Wales
