= David Graham (Irish cricketer) =

Irish cricketer

Personal information
- Full name: David Graham
- Born: 13 March 1922; Dublin, Ireland
- Died: 17 July 2009 (aged 87); Harrow, London, England
- Batting: Right-handed
- Bowling: Right-arm fast-medium

Domestic team information
- Years: Team
- 1948: Ireland

Career statistics
Competition	First-class
Matches	1
Runs scored	13
Batting average	6.50
100s/50s	–/–
Top score	7
Balls bowled	96
Wickets	1
Bowling average	20.00
5 wickets in innings	–
10 wickets in match	–
Best bowling	1/13
Catches/stumpings	–/–
- Source: Cricinfo, 29 October 2021

David Graham (13 March 1922 – 17 July 2009) was a Northern Irish cricketer. A right-handed batsman and right-arm fast-medium bowler, he played twice for the Ireland cricket team in 1948, making his debut against Yorkshire in June, and then playing a first-class match against Scotland the following month. Graham was born in Belfast in March 1922 and died in Harrow, London in July 2009 at the age of 87.
