= 2016 in Northern Ireland =

- Centuries: 20th; 21st
- Decades: 1990s; 2000s; 2010s; 2020s
- See also: 2016 in the United Kingdom; 2016 in Ireland; Other events of 2016; List of years in Northern Ireland

Events during the year 2016 in Northern Ireland.

== Incumbents ==
- First Minister - Peter Robinson
- deputy First Minister - Martin McGuiness
- Secretary of State - Theresa Villiers (until 14 July), James Brokenshire (from 14 July)

== Events ==
- 11 January – Arlene Foster becomes the first women to lead the Democratic Unionist Party and becomes Northern Ireland's first woman First Minister.
- 8 March – Austins (department store) in Derry closes suddenly after 186 years' trading.
- 5 May – 2016 Northern Ireland Assembly election. There is no significant change to the position of the main parties.
- 4 October – Flights are disrupted at Belfast International Airport after a freight plane gets stuck on the runway.

== Deaths ==
- 7 January – Paddy Doherty, activist (born 1926)
- 12 January – Robert Black, serial killer (born 1947 in Scotland)
- 25 June - Patrick Mayhew, 10th Secretary of State for Northern Ireland (born 1929).

== See also ==
- 2016 in England
- 2016 in Scotland
- 2016 in Wales
