= 2017 in Northern Ireland =

- Centuries: 20th; 21st
- Decades: 1990s; 2000s; 2010s; 2020s
- See also: 2017 in the United Kingdom; 2017 in Ireland; Other events of 2017; List of years in Northern Ireland

Events during the year 2017 in Northern Ireland.

== Incumbents ==
- First Minister – Arlene Foster (until 9 January)
- deputy First Minister – Martin McGuinness (until 9 January)
- Secretary of State for Northern Ireland – James Brokenshire

== Events ==
- January – The deputy First Minister, Martin McGuinness resigns in protest of the handling of the Renewable Heat Incentive scandal.
- 2 March – 2017 Northern Ireland Assembly election takes place.
- 8 April – Robin Swann announced as the new Ulster Unionist Party leader.
- 8 June – UK General election takes place.

== The arts ==
- June – Agreement for filming of Krypton (TV series) at Belfast Harbour Studios.

== Deaths ==
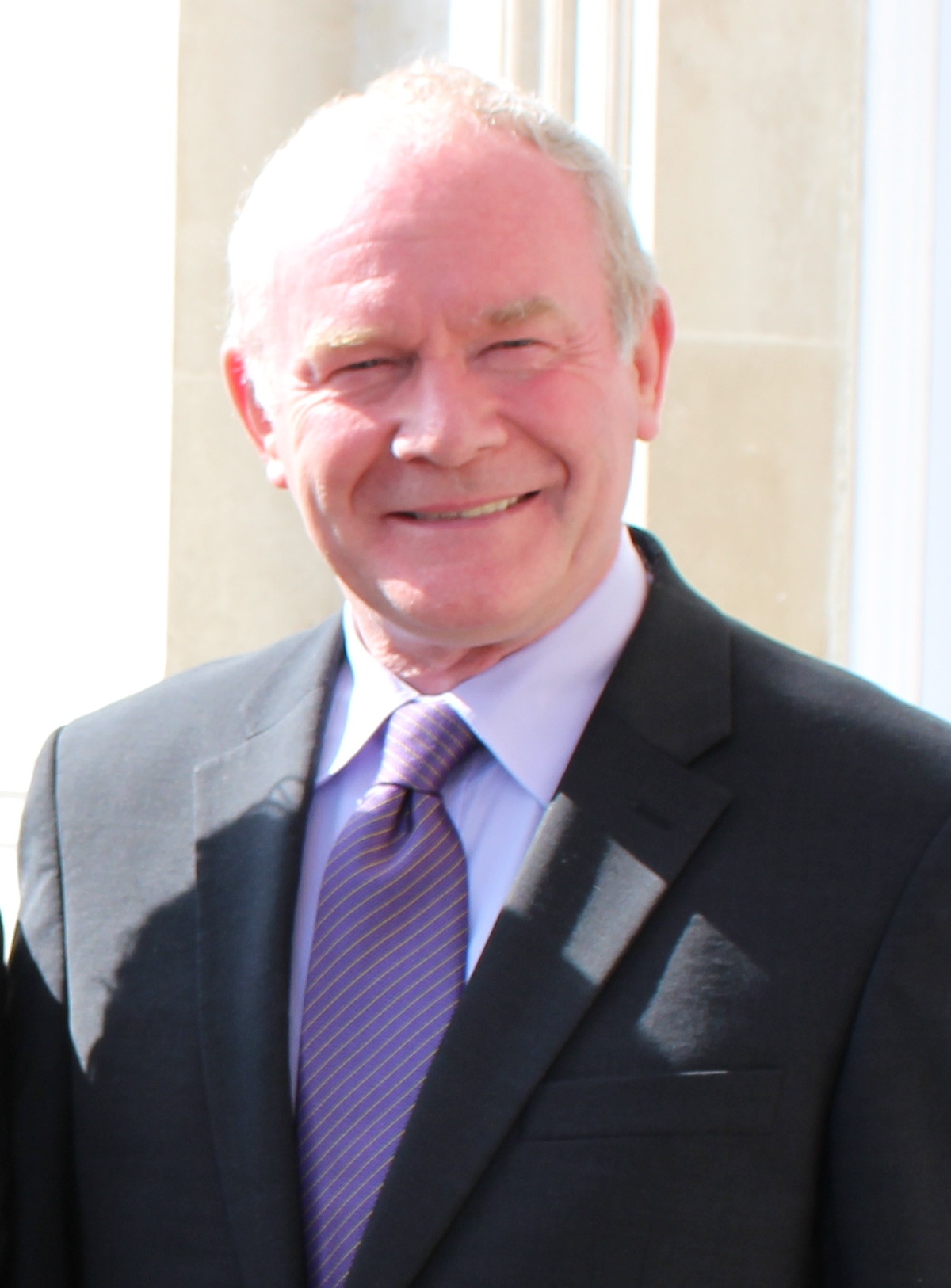
Martin McGuinness

- 27 January – Billy Simpson, footballer (b. 1929)
- 1 March – P. J. Bradley, politician (b. 1940)
- 21 March – Martin McGuinness, Sinn Féin politician and presidential candidate, amyloidosis (b. 1950).
- 4 June – Patrick G. Johnston, physician (b. 1958)
- 11 June – Alan Campbell, Pentecostal pastor (b. 1949)
- 25 June – Robert Overend, farmer, businessman and Unionist politician (b. 1930)
- 24 October – Glenn Barr, UDA politician and advocate, member of Northern Ireland Assembly and Constitutional Convention (b. 1942)

== See also ==
- 2017 in England
- 2017 in Scotland
- 2017 in Wales
