= 2013 in Northern Ireland =

- Centuries: 20th; 21st
- Decades: 1990s; 2000s; 2010s; 2020s
- See also: 2013 in the United Kingdom; 2013 in Ireland; Other events of 2013; List of years in Northern Ireland

Events during the year 2013 in Northern Ireland.

== Incumbents ==
- First Minister - Peter Robinson
- deputy First Minister - Martin McGuiness
- Secretary of State - Theresa Villiers

== Events ==
=== February ===
- 16 February – An Irish Premiership match between Crusaders and Cliftonville was called off on security advice following a Union flag demonstration outside the ground.
- 23 February – Ryan Dolan from Strabane, County Tyrone, was announced as Ireland's entry for the 2013 Eurovision Song Contest.
- c. February – The last working Irish linen factory in Belfast closed.

=== March ===
- 17 March – Saint Patrick's Day festival.

=== April ===
- 17 April – The Dalai Lama Tenzin Gyatso, as patron of the charity Children in Crossfire, began a two-day visit to Derry where he was guest of honour at a Culture of Compassion event. He last visited the city in July 2007.

=== May ===
- 3 May – Brian Shivers was acquitted of any involvement in the 2009 Massereene Barracks shooting. Mr. Shivers, who had cystic fibrosis, had his life sentence overturned, having been jailed since January 2012 in what his solicitor described as a miscarriage of justice.
- c. 29 May – Echlinville Distillery at Kircubbin, County Down, was granted the first licence to distil spirits in Northern Ireland in over 130 years.

=== June ===
- 17–18 June – The 39th G8 summit was held at the Lough Erne Resort in County Fermanagh.

=== July ===
- 12 July – The marching season culminated in The Twelfth celebration of the Glorious Revolution and the Battle of the Boyne, beginning the 2013 Belfast riots.

=== October ===
- 25 October – Two letter bombs, one addressed to the chief constable of the Police Service of Northern Ireland, Matt Baggott, and another to a senior police officer, were defused by bomb disposal experts at postal sorting offices in Mallusk and Lisburn in County Antrim.
- 28 October – A letter bomb delivered to the offices of the Public Prosecution Service at Foyle Chambers on Limavady Road in Derry was made safe and taken for forensic examination.
- 29 October – A letter bomb was sent to Northern Ireland secretary Theresa Villiers. Bomb disposal officers were called to Stormont Castle to deal with it. Villiers was in London at the time.

=== November ===
- 15 November – Musician Van Morrison was awarded the freedom of Belfast.
- 20 November – A bus driver in Derry was ordered by suspected IRA militants to deliver a bomb to police headquarters, a frequent IRA target. She agreed, but parked the bus and called police, who removed the bomb.
- 24 November – A man was stopped in the Ardoyne area of Belfast by three masked men and forced to drive a bomb to Victoria Square shopping centre in the city centre. The detonator ignited while bomb disposal experts prepared to examine the car but it failed to trigger an explosion.
- 27 November – Liam Adams, the brother of Sinn Féin leader Gerry Adams, was sentenced to sixteen years in prison by Laganside Crown Court in Belfast for sexually abusing his daughter Áine.

=== December ===
- 3 December – The Smithwick Tribunal inquiry in Dublin into the 1989 Jonesborough ambush found that members of the Garda Síochána colluded with the IRA in the shooting of two RUC officers as they crossed the Irish border.
- 13 December – An explosion occurred in the Cathedral Quarter of Belfast when extremists opposed to the peace in Northern Ireland left a sports bag containing an explosive on the pavement. Christmas revellers evacuated nearby bars and restaurants. Óglaigh na hÉireann claimed responsibility
- 16 December – The army defused a pipe bomb found in the garden of a house in West Belfast. Later, a fire bomb being carried by an extremist ignited in a shop in the Cornmarket shopping district in Belfast, setting the bomber on fire. He fled through the streets in flames, while the device was taken outside by a member of the shop's staff. A man was arrested five days later.
- 18 December – The Police Service of Northern Ireland and Garda Síochána prevented a serious bomb attack, probably on a commercial target in Belfast, by arresting two men and a woman from Dundalk in both Dundalk and County Armagh. Police found equipment and ingredients to create a large fertilizer bomb.
- 31 December – The six-month Haass negotiations concluded without resolving inter-community conflict over flags, parades, and the history of The Troubles.

== The arts ==
=== Music ===
- 12 January — "Sons and Daughters" opening concert for Derry's UK City of Culture year.

== Sports ==
=== Association football ===
- 26 January — Irish Football League Cup final.

=== Athletics ===
- 1–10 August — World Police and Fire Games.

== Deaths ==
- 21 January — Inez McCormack, trade union leader (born 1946).
- 7 November — John Cole, 85, broadcaster and journalist, BBC political editor (1981–1992).
- 11 November — Eddie McGrady, 78, founder member of the Social Democratic and Labour Party, long illness.

== See also ==
- 2013 in England
- 2013 in Scotland
- 2013 in Wales
