= 2015 in Northern Ireland =

- Centuries: 20th; 21st
- Decades: 1990s; 2000s; 2010s; 2020s
- See also: 2015 in the United Kingdom; 2015 in Ireland; Other events of 2015; List of years in Northern Ireland

Events during the year 2015 in Northern Ireland.

== Incumbents ==
- First Minister - Peter Robinson
  - Acting First Minister - Arlene Foster (20 September – 31 October)
- deputy First Minister - Martin McGuiness
- Secretary of State - Theresa Villiers

== Events ==
=== January ===
- 1 January – New Year's Day (public holiday).

=== February ===
- 17 February – The Police Service of Northern Ireland received a phone call, allegedly from a dissident republican group, claiming to have planted an explosive in a Curryneirin neighborhood outside Derry. Police evacuated 12 homes before finding a device, saying, "It's a bomb and designed to kill".

=== March ===
- 11 March – A major fire occurred in Derry. The blaze broke out at around 12:50 GMT on the Queens Quay area of the city. One hundred and thirty fire fighters were at the scene. Major disruption was caused around the city but no-one was hurt.
- 13 March – Northern Ireland faced its biggest strike yet with teachers, public transport, ambulance staff, civil servants, and others striking because of staff and budget cuts. It caused major disruption across the province.
- 15 March – Mothering Sunday.
- 17 March – Saint Patrick's Day (public holiday).
- 29 March – Palm Sunday. Clocks went forward one hour when British Summer Time (BST) began.

=== April ===
- 1 April- Northern Ireland's brand new super councils came down from 26 to just 11.
- 3 April – Good Friday (public holiday).
- 6 April – Easter Monday (public holiday).
- 15 April – A fishing boat, the Karen, with nets in the water, was dragged backwards rapidly in the Irish Sea, 30 kilometres from Ardglass, County Down, at the Calf of Man. The trawler was badly damaged but the four crew members were unhurt; they suspected they were dragged by a Russian submarine.

=== May ===
- 4 May – May Day and Labour Day (public holiday).
- 25 May – Spring public holiday.

=== June ===
- June - A joint collaboration between the Grand Orange Lodge of Ireland and County Armagh Grand Orange Lodge sees Museum of Orange Heritage open sites in Schomberg House, Belfast and Sloan's Inn, Loughgall.
- 21 June – Father's Day.

=== July ===
- 12 July – Orangeman's Day (actual date).
- 13 July – Orangeman's Day (observed). Marching season culminates in The Twelfth celebration of the Glorious Revolution and the Battle of the Boyne.

=== August ===
- 31 August – August public holiday.

=== October ===
- 25 October – Clocks go back one hour when British Summer Time (BST) ends.
- 31 October – Hallowe'en.

=== December ===
- 25 December – Christmas Day (public holiday).
- 26 December – Boxing Day (actual date).
- 28 December – Boxing Day (observed).

== Sports ==
=== Association football ===
International friendly matches

- 25 March – Scotland v Northern Ireland.

Euro 2016 qualifiers

- 29 March – Northern Ireland v Finland.
- 13 June – Northern Ireland v Romania.
- 4 September – Faroe Islands v Northern Ireland.
- 7 September – Northern Ireland v Hungary.
- 8 October – Northern Ireland v Greece.
- 11 October – Finland v Northern Ireland.

== See also ==
- 2015 in England
- 2015 in Scotland
- 2015 in Wales
