= Sheila McGibbon =

Irish stage, radio and television actress

Sheila McGibbon Cast photo of All Souls Night by Ulster Actors Company at Arts Theatre Belfast

Sheila R. McGibbon (16 June 1921, in Belfast, Northern Ireland – 4 October 1997) was an Irish stage, radio and television actress. She was born to a modest Catholic family in 1921, and died in 1997, the same year as her husband, John Graham, a Protestant IRA volunteer and later pro-golfer. They had seven children whom they raised in the Belfast area.

Throughout her distinguished career, she starred in numerous plays in the Abbey Theatre, Dublin, and in the Lyric Theatre, Belfast. According to Irish Playography documents, she starred in over 30 plays. She also starred in numerous radio, television, and movie roles. Some of the plays and radio shows McGibbon starred in were later broadcast on television which she also starred in. Her first radio broadcast was on 26 February 1955; her last was on 29 June 1995. In 1988 McGibbon appeared in the television dramatised documentary, God's Frontiersmen as "Elizabeth Brownlee", and was offered a role for a film but declined.

== Legacy ==
Sheila McGibbon remains one of the more noted Irish actresses of her time. Her picture still remains framed in the lobby of Ireland's national theatre, the Abbey Theatre in Dublin. Her picture also remains in the memorial of the Lyric Theatre, Dublin.

In 1969 McGibbon was chosen to fly on the first Concorde flight, and was subsequently the first Irish actress to ever fly on Concorde.

== Plays ==
The following plays were produced in Belfast by the Ulster Group Theatre, the Belfast Arts Theatre and the Lyric Theatre, Belfast.

- The Belle of the Belfast City (as Dolly) (1989)
- Culture Vultures (as Sarah) (1988)
- Tea in a China Cup (as Great Aunt Maisie) (1983)
- We Do It For Love (as Mrs. Ryan) (1975)
- Guests (as Min Meeneely) (1974)
- Nightfall to Belfast (as Mrs. Rogers) (1973)
- Separate Beds (as Sarah Rea) (1970)
- Stars of Brickfield Street (1971)
- The Mating Season (as Mrs. Jamieson) (1969)
- Family Fever (Sadie Galbraith) (1968)
- Stop it Nurse (as Martha Cooper) (1968)
- The Square Peg (as Annie McQuillan) (1950)

== Radio programs ==
The following radio programs were produced and recorded by and for the BBC:

- The Clearance of Audleystown – 29 June 1995
- The Colleen Bawn – 3 November 1990
- The Last of a Dyin' Race (Part One) – 14 January 1986
- The Last of a Dyin' Race (Part Two) – 21 January 1986
- Ulster Final – September 1983
- Beyond the Pale – 1980
- Maguire – 1980
- The McCooeys – 26 February 1955

== Television programs ==
- The Square Peg (1958)
- The Mating Season (1980)
- Ties of Blood (1985)
- First Sight (1986)
- God's Frontiersmen (1988) (as Elizabeth Brownlee)
- Screenplay (1989)
