= 2012 in Northern Ireland =

- Centuries: 20th; 21st
- Decades: 1990s; 2000s; 2010s; 2020s
- See also: 2012 in the United Kingdom; 2012 in Ireland; Other events of 2012; List of years in Northern Ireland

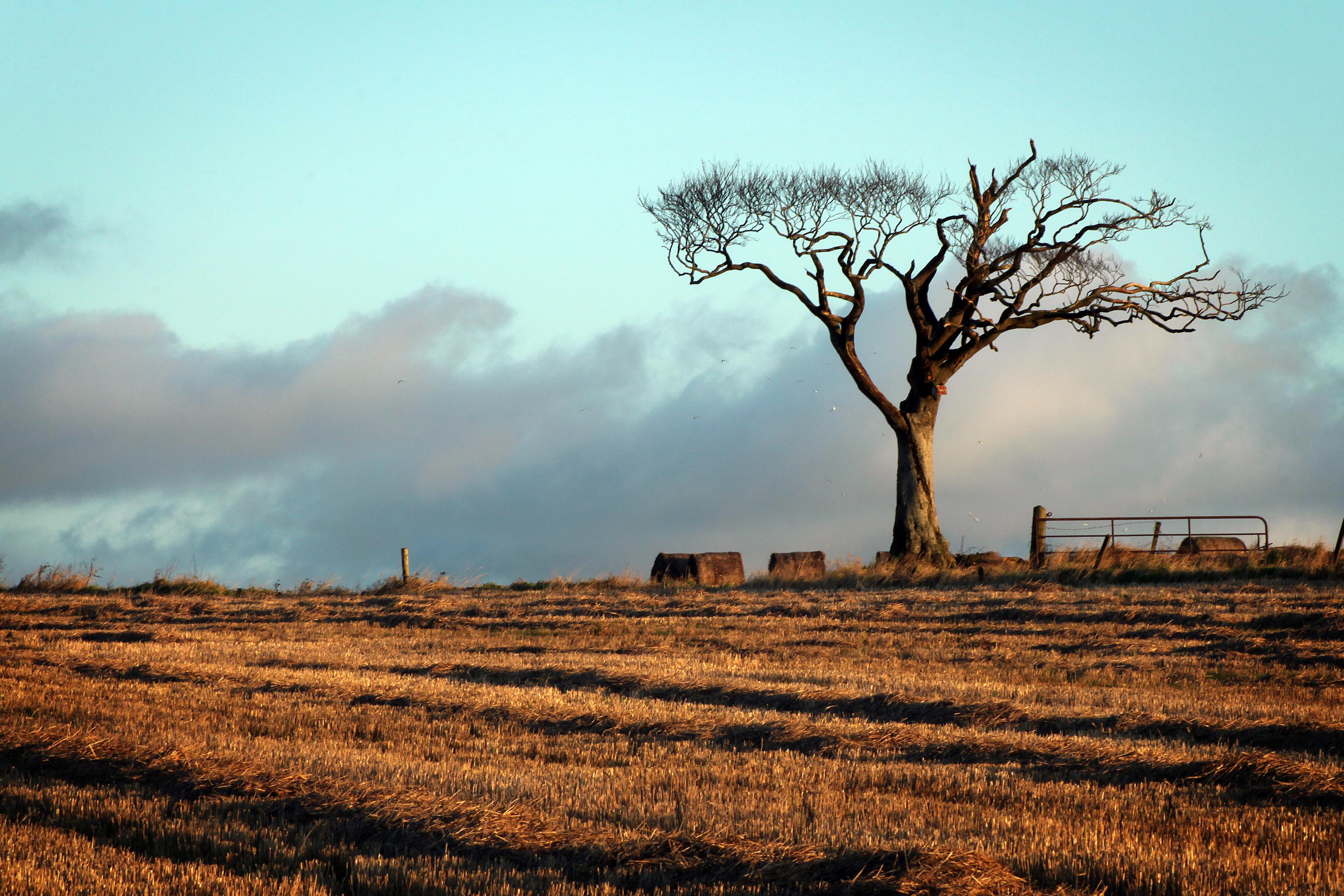
North Down, Northern Ireland, United Kingdom, 2012.

Events during the year 2012 in Northern Ireland.

== Incumbents ==
- First Minister - Peter Robinson
- Deputy First Minister - Martin McGuiness
- Secretary of State - Owen Paterson (until 4 September), Theresa Villiers (from 4 September)

== Events ==
=== March ===
- 17 March – Saint Patrick's Day parade and carnival in Belfast city centre and Custom House Square.
- 31 March – Former broadcast journalist Mike Nesbitt elected leader of the Ulster Unionist Party.

=== April ===
- 15 April – RMS Titanic maiden voyage centenary celebrations, including opening of £90m Titanic Belfast visitor facility.

=== May ===
- 3 May – Bairbre de Brún submitted her resignation to the European Parliament as MEP for Northern Ireland.
- 22 May – Murder of Michaela McAreavey trial began in Mauritius.

=== June ===
- Lord Mayor's Parade in Belfast.
- Queen Elizabeth's Diamond Jubilee celebrations throughout Northern Ireland.
- 26 June – The Queen began a two-day visit to Northern Ireland in Enniskillen.
- 27 June – The Queen met former IRA commander Martin McGuinness for the first time, in Belfast. They met and shook hands in private in the McGrath Suite of the Lyric Theatre. The meeting was witnessed by the Duke of Edinburgh, the Northern Ireland first minister, Peter Robinson, the President of Ireland, Michael D. Higgins, and his wife, Sabina. The Queen and McGuinness shook hands once more in public for the benefit of the media. It was also the first meeting between the Queen and the recently elected president Higgins.

=== July ===
- 3 July – Giant's Causeway Visitors' Centre designed by Heneghan Peng for the National Trust was opened.
- 12 July – Marching season culminated in The Twelfth celebration of the Glorious Revolution and the Battle of the Boyne.

=== August ===
- 16 August – Thirty antique accordions were stolen in County Down.

=== September ===
- 13 September – Fermanagh player Brian Óg Maguire died in an industrial accident in the Ballymaconnell Road area of Derrylin.
- 15 September – Ulster player Nevin Spence died in County Down. His father and brother also died.

=== October ===
- 4 October – Expelled Ulster Unionist Party member David McNarry, representing Strangford, joined the UK Independence Party, giving it its first representative in any of the devolved assemblies in Britain and Northern Ireland.
- 18 October – Marie Stopes International opened a clinic in Belfast.
- 23 October – Derry was named fourth in a top ten of cities to visit in 2013 by the travel guidebook Lonely Planet.
- 24 October – Digital television transition in the UK is completed in Northern Ireland.

=== November ===
- 3 November – Match for Michaela at Casement Park.

=== December ===
- 3 December – Trouble flared in Belfast as hundreds of hooded Loyalists burn Irish tricolours and tried to storm Belfast City Hall.

== The arts ==
- 20 April – Belfast MAC (Metropolitan Arts Centre), designed by Hackett Hall McKnight, opened.
- June – European Pipe Band Championships in Stormont.
- Glenn Patterson's novel The Mill for Grinding Old People Young was published.

== Sports ==
=== January ===
- 16 January – Occupy Belfast: The Bank of Ireland was occupied in the city.
- 28 January – Irish Football League Cup final – Coleraine v Crusaders.

=== February ===
- Irish Indoor Athletics Championships in the Odyssey Arena.

=== March ===
- 17 March – Loughgiel Shamrocks (Antrim) won the All-Ireland Senior Club Hurling Championship, defeating Coolderry GAA (Offaly) 4–13 to 0–07 in the final.
- 31 March – Crossmaglen Rangers (Armagh) won the All-Ireland Senior Club Football Championship, defeating Garrycastle (Westmeath) 2–19 to 1–07 in the replay after the final initially ended in a 0–15 to 1–12 draw on 17 March.

=== May ===
- 15 May – The most supported football team in Northern Ireland, Manchester United played a testimonial match for their former goalkeeper, Harry Gregg against an Irish Premiership Select XI in front of over 14,000 Northern Irish Manchester United fans at Windsor Park in Belfast.

- 19 May – Ulster Rugby contested the 2012 Heineken Cup Final, losing 42–14 to Leinster Rugby.
- Belfast City Marathon.

=== June ===
- 3 June – The Olympic Flame arrived in Belfast, with relay runners carrying it to towns, villages, and beauty spots throughout Northern Ireland.

=== July ===
- 22 July – Donegal defeated Down 2–18 to 0–13 to win a second consecutive Ulster Senior Football Championship.

=== August ===
- British Transplant Games in Belfast.

== Deaths ==
- 20 January - Lucy Faulkner, journalist, 86
- 22 February - Frank Carson, comedian and actor, 85
- 16 April - Ray Davey, minister, founded the Corrymeela Community, 97

== See also ==
- 2012 in England
- 2012 in Scotland
- 2012 in Wales
