= 2011 in Northern Ireland =

- Centuries: 20th; 21st
- Decades: 1990s; 2000s; 2010s; 2020s
- See also: 2011 in the United Kingdom; 2011 in Ireland; Other events of 2011; List of years in Northern Ireland

Events during the year 2011 in Northern Ireland.

== Incumbents ==
- First Minister - Peter Robinson
- deputy First Minister - Martin McGuiness
  - Acting deputy first minister - John O'Dowd (20 September – 31 October)
- Secretary of State - Owen Paterson

== Events ==
- 4 January – A partial solar eclipse is visible during sunrise in Northern Ireland
- 5 January – Edward Stevenson elected Orange grand master of the Grand Orange Lodge of Ireland, replacing Robert Saulters, who held the post for 14 years
- 6 January - Laurence Mackenzie resigns as chief executive of Northern Ireland Water in response to criticism of the organisation's handling of a water shortage
- 26 January – British prime minister David Cameron announces Sinn Féin's Gerry Adams' resignation from the British House of Commons by appointment as Crown Steward and Bailiff of the Manor of Northstead (technically an "office of profit under the Crown"). This resignation is to enable Adams to stand in the general election in the Republic of Ireland in the Louth constituency, where he is elected on 25 February
- 28 March – The British government issues a formal apology to the family of Majella O'Hare who was a 12-year-old that was shot and killed by a British paratrooper in 1976.
- 31 March – HMS Caroline (1914) decommissioned in Belfast
- 10 June – Sinn Féin's Paul Maskey wins the West Belfast by-election
- 20 June – 2011 Northern Ireland riots originate in East Belfast
- 25 June – Peace Bridge across the River Foyle in Derry opens
- 6 November – Alasdair McDonnell elected new SDLP leader
- 30 November – Thousands of public sector workers across Northern Ireland take strike action in the biggest walk-out in a generation

== The arts ==
- 4 January – Author Maggie O'Farrell, born in Coleraine, wins the 2010 Costa novel award for her novel, The Hand That First Held Mine
- 17 April – Epic fantasy television series Game of Thrones, filmed in Belfast and on location elsewhere in Northern Ireland, premieres on HBO in the United States
- 1 May – New Lyric Theatre, Belfast, designed by O'Donnell & Tuomey of Dublin, opens
- 26 September – Singer Rihanna is asked by farmer and Democratic Unionist Party (DUP) alderman Alan Graham to leave his grain field near Ballygilbert when she strips to the waist while recording a music video
- October – Lucy Caldwell is awarded the Rooney Prize for Irish Literature
- Eoghan Walls's poetry collection The Salt Harvest is published

== Sports ==
=== GAA ===
- 17 March – Crossmaglen Rangers (Armagh) defeated St. Bridgid's (Roscommon) 2–11 to 1–11 to win the All-Ireland Senior Club Football Championship
- 17 July – Donegal defeat Derry 1–11 to 0–08 to win the Ulster Senior Football Championship

== Deaths ==
- 2 January – Pete Postlethwaite, 64: English actor, of cancer. Portrayed Giuseppe Conlon, father of Gerard Conlon, one of the Guildford Four, in the 1994 film In the Name of the Father
- 29 January – Raymond McClean, 78: former SDLP Mayor of Derry, civil rights activist, author.
- 6 February – Gary Moore, 58: former Thin Lizzy guitarist. Heart attack while on holiday in Estepona, Spain

== See also ==
- 2011 in England
- 2011 in Scotland
- 2011 in Wales
