= 2018 in Northern Ireland =

- Centuries: 20th; 21st
- Decades: 1990s; 2000s; 2010s; 2020s
- See also: 2018 in the United Kingdom; 2018 in Ireland; Other events of 2018; List of years in Northern Ireland

Events during the year 2018 in Northern Ireland.

== Incumbents ==
- First Minister – Vacant
- deputy First Minister – Vacant
- Secretary of State for Northern Ireland – James Brokenshire (until 8 January), Karen Bradley (from 8 January)

== Events ==
- 8 January – Sinn Féin MP Barry McElduff was suspended from all party activity for three months after he posted a video online that relatives of the victims of the 1976 Kingsmill massacre described as callous and offensive. He resigned as an MP a week later.
- 15 January – Resignation of Sinn Féin MP, Barry McElduff, which will result in a by-election for West Tyrone on 3 May; the seat is retained by Sinn Féin.
- 10 October – In a unanimous decision, the Supreme Court of the U.K. rules the Christian owners of Ashers Baking Co. were not obliged by law to make a cake featuring the words "Support Gay Marriage".

== The arts ==
- 4 January – Sitcom Derry Girls, set in the 1990s, premieres on Channel 4 television.
- 4 April – The BBC Radio 2 Folk Awards take place at the Waterfront Hall in Belfast.
- May – Anna Burns' novel Milkman, set in a fictionalised Belfast during The Troubles, is published; on 16 October it is awarded the Man Booker Prize, making the author its first winner from Northern Ireland.

== Deaths ==
- 22 February – Gladys Maccabe, painter (b. 1918)
- 3 March – Arthur Stewart, footballer (Glentoran, Derby County, Detroit Cougars) (b. 1958)
- 7 July – William Dunlop, motorcycle racer, collision during practice (b. 1985)
- 10 July – John Laird, Baron Laird, Unionist politician (b. 1944)
- 5 September – Robert Coulter, Unionist politician, MLA for Antrim North (1998–2011) (b. 1929)
- 22 September – Jo Gilbert, film producer (Closing the Ring) and casting director, brain tumour (b. 1955 in England)
- 4 October – Bertie McMinn, footballer (Distillery, Glenavon, Moyola Park), cancer (b. 1958)
- 11 October – Jimbo Simpson, UDA paramilitary, lung cancer, 60

== See also ==
- 2018 in England
- 2018 in Scotland
- 2018 in Wales
