= Alex Kersey-Brown =

Wales international rugby league footballer

Personal information
- Full name: Malcolm Alexander Kersey-Brown
- Born: 18 November 1942 Bristol, England
- Died: 23 November 2015 (aged 73)

Playing information

Rugby union
- Position: Centre and wing
Club
Years	Team	Pld	T	G	FG	P
1962–67	London Welsh RFC

Rugby league
- Position: Wing, Centre
Club
Years	Team	Pld	T	G	FG	P
1967–72	Huddersfield
1970	→ Oldham (loan)	3	0	0		0
	Total	3	0	0	0	0
Representative
Years	Team	Pld	T	G	FG	P
1968–69	Wales	2	0	0		0

Malcolm Alexander Kersey-Brown (18 November 1942 – 23 November 2015) was an English-born Welsh rugby union, and professional rugby league footballer who played in the 1960s and 1970s. He played representative level rugby union (RU) for Welsh Schoolboys, and at club level for London Welsh RFC, and representative level rugby league (RL) for Wales, and at club level for Huddersfield and Oldham (loan), as a wing or centre.

== International honours ==
Kersey-Brown won two caps for Wales (RL) while at Huddersfield in 1968–69.

== Playing career ==
Kersey-Brown played rugby unions as a school boy and gained Welsh caps. He lived in Penmaenmawr, North Wales, and a few of his later team members at London Welsh knew him there and played rugby with him, such as Tony Gray. The London Welsh team was led by John Dawes who had a specific training programme in the early 1960s which honed the team and contributed later to the success of the British Lions team 1971–73.

In November 1967, Kersey-Brown switched codes to rugby league and joined Huddersfield. He was a regular in the team for his first three seasons before injury hampered his final two years at the club. He also had a brief spell at Oldham in 1970. He died of cancer on 23 November 2015, aged 73.
