= Murder of Philip Finnegan =

2016 murder in Ireland

Philip Finnegan
- Born: c. 1992
- Died: 10 August 2016 (aged 24)
- Cause of death: Stabbing
- Known for: Murder victim

Philip Finnegan (c.1992 – 10 August 2016) was an Irishman who was killed in August 2016. Originally reported as missing, his remains were discovered on 2 September 2016. On 15 November 2021, Stephen Penrose was found guilty of his murder.

== Background ==
Finnegan was 24 years old at the time of his death, and was a father to either three or four children. Finnegan was known to Gardaí prior to his death for his involvement in organised crime, and had been shot and attacked on numerous occasions before his death. He had also previously been charged with firearms offences, though he was acquitted of these charges. Finnegan and Penrose have been described as having been friends.

Penrose had previously stood on trial for the murder of David Sharkey in 2010, (Note: The trial took place in 2010, the killing in 2009.) after he stabbed him to death, though he was found not guilty of murder but guilty of manslaughter on that occasion.

== Disappearance and murder ==
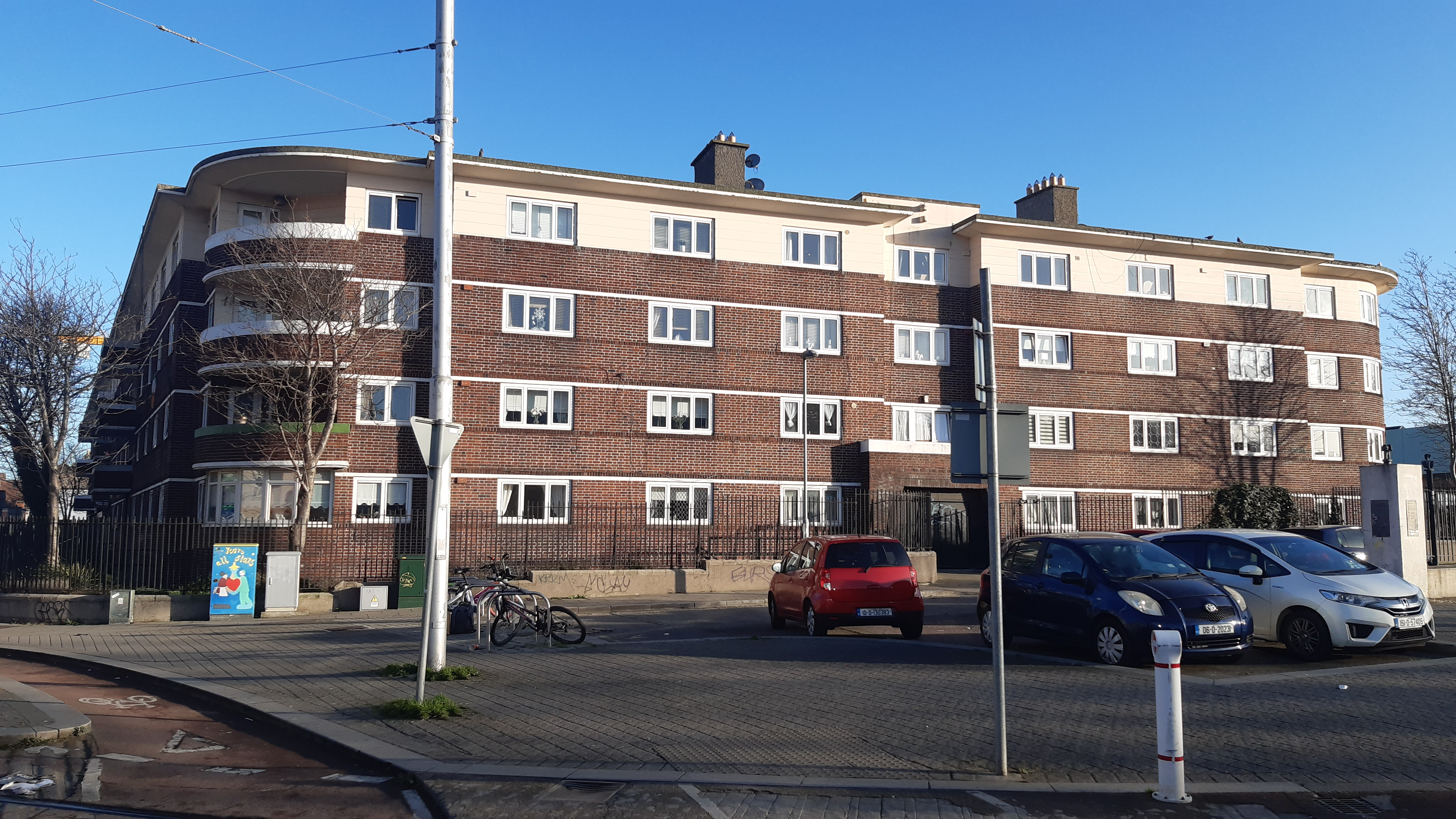
Mary Aikenhead House in 2026

Philip Finnegan went missing from his home at Mary Aikenhead House in Dublin 8 on 10 August 2016. His mother reported him missing the following day, and on 13 August Gardaí issued an appeal for information from the public regarding his whereabouts. His remains were found by a couple of walkers close to a month later, partially buried in Rahin Wood, close to Carbury in County Kildare on 2 September 2016, at roughly 20:45. It is believed that Finnegan was killed at the site where his body was found. He had been wearing a bullet-proof vest, and this was found on the body. Finnegan was found in a foetal position, with his clothes charred from an attempt to burn his corpse. A garden fork, a shovel, and the blade of a knife were found close by to Finnegan's corpse, and a garden glove, a funnel, and a destroyed mobile phone were found in a nearby fire-pit. Finnegan's remains were transferred to Naas General Hospital for an autopsy.

Gardaí initially suspected that Finnegan may have owed money to a criminal gang, and that they had abducted him. On 31 August 2016, Stephen Penrose was arrested and interviewed 10 times in relation to withholding information related to a serious assault on Finnegan. He was released on 2 September. On 16 November 2016, Stephen Penrose was rearrested by Gardaí in Portlaoise on suspicion of Finnegan's murder, and was brought to Leixlip Garda Station.

== Trial ==
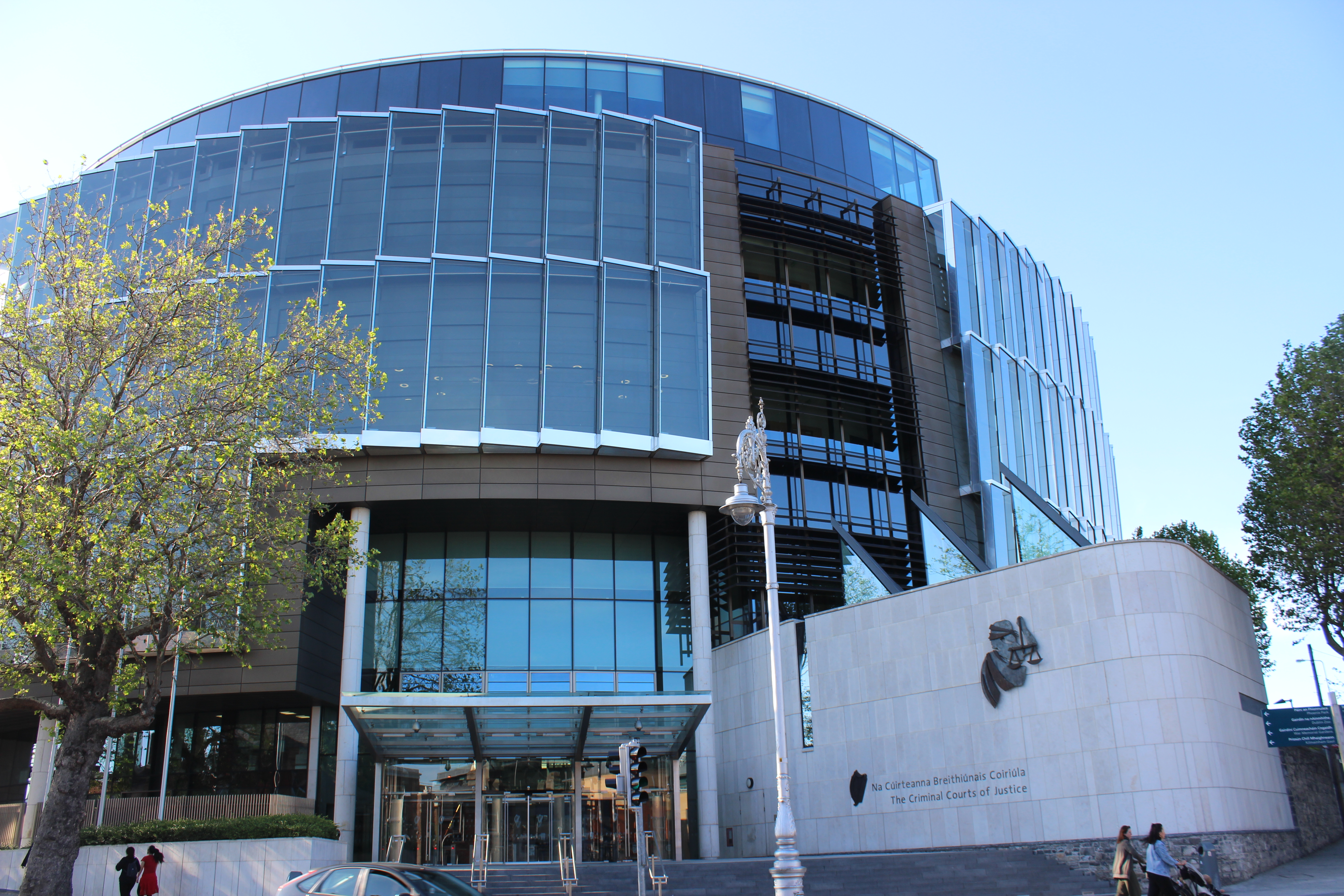
The Criminal Courts of Justice, which hosts the Central Criminal Court in Dublin

At approximately 10:25 a.m. on 7 November 2017, Stephen Penrose appeared before Judge Desmond Zaidan at the District Court at Naas Courthouse, having been charged with Finnegan's murder. The court was informed that Penrose made no reply to the charge, and he was remanded in custody at Cloverhill prison.

On 12 October 2021, the jury for the case was sworn in by Judge Paul McDermott, consisting of eight men and four women. The following day Penrose appeared before Judge Alexander Owens at the Central Criminal Court in Dublin, and entered a not guilty plea on the charge of murder. The jury heard from Brendan Grehan, prosecuting, that Finnegan had met a "gruesome" death. A bloodied glove, which was a DNA match to Penrose, and the fact that Penrose's mobile phone had pinged a cell tower nearby the site of Finnegan's murder were central to the prosecution's case.

The week his trial began, and before it opened on 13 November, Penrose dismissed his initial legal team and for a week represented himself in court. During this time, he cross-examined Finnegan's mother, Angela Finnegan, who said that she believed another person was involved in her son's death. At the time of Finnegan's murder, this individual, who has not been named by the press, was incarcerated at Portlaoise Prison. Penrose's behaviour during cross-examination of witnesses was deemed unacceptable by Judge Owens, who informed Penrose that if he continued to "abuse" witnesses, Owens would have Penrose removed from the courtroom and taken to holding cells, along with banning him from participating in the trial. In particular, his behaviour in examining Inspector Aidan Hannon was criticized by the judge. Penrose repeatedly accused Hannon of lying to the court, claiming that Hannon "is a liar and he is lying under oath." Penrose began to wave a piece of paper in the air and shouted to the jury, including shouting "[Hannon] is telling bullshit about me".

On 20 October, the jury was informed that Penrose had hired a second legal team. After this point, Penrose stopped attending the proceedings. On 1 November, Penrose dismissed this legal team too. Penrose repeatedly rehired and fired both of his legal teams. Such was his behaviour throughout the trial that Mr Justice Owens instructed the jury to ignore Penrose's behaviour in court, his general character, and his repeated taking on and then dismissing of legal teams. In the absence of the jury Owens criticized Penrose's behaviour in regards to his treatment of his legal teams, describing his actions as serious abuses of the legal system, and "simply not on".

On 29 October 2021, Penrose's six initial interviews with Gardaí were played for the jury. Penrose gave a total of 19 interviews, making often contradictory statements between interviews, though he maintained that himself and Finnegan had been attacked.

On 3 November 2021 it was revealed that Finnegan's remains were found in a skeletonised condition, and that the body had been decapitated. It was further revealed that the cause of death had been two fatal stab wounds that Finnegan received both to his liver and to his aorta. In total, Finnegan's body had received 13 stab wounds, the majority of which were to his back. Despite the corpse being found in a state of advanced decomposition, Finnegan's identity was confirmed by fingerprint analysis.

On 15 November, Penrose was found guilty of murder. The jury deliberated for close to six hours over two days before reaching a unanimous verdict. His sentencing was scheduled for 13 December 2021, at which point he was sentenced to the mandatory sentence of life imprisonment. Penrose's sentence was not backdated as from the time he was first charged he was already in custody serving several other offenses.

== See also ==
- List of solved missing person cases (post-2000)
