= Jamie Bishop (cricketer) =

Welsh cricketer

Jamie Bishop (14 January 1971 – 1 May 2015) was a Welsh cricketer. He was a left-handed batsman and wicket-keeper who played for Glamorgan. He was born in Pontarddulais.

Bishop, who played Minor Counties Championship cricket with Wales Minor Counties, and played with the Glamorgan Second XI between 1989 and 1994, made a single first-class appearance for the side, during the 1992 season, against Oxford University.

From the upper-middle order, he scored 51 runs in the only innings in which he batted.
