= Murder of Claire Holland =

2012 murder in Bristol, England

Coordinates: 51.453835°N 2.593421°W

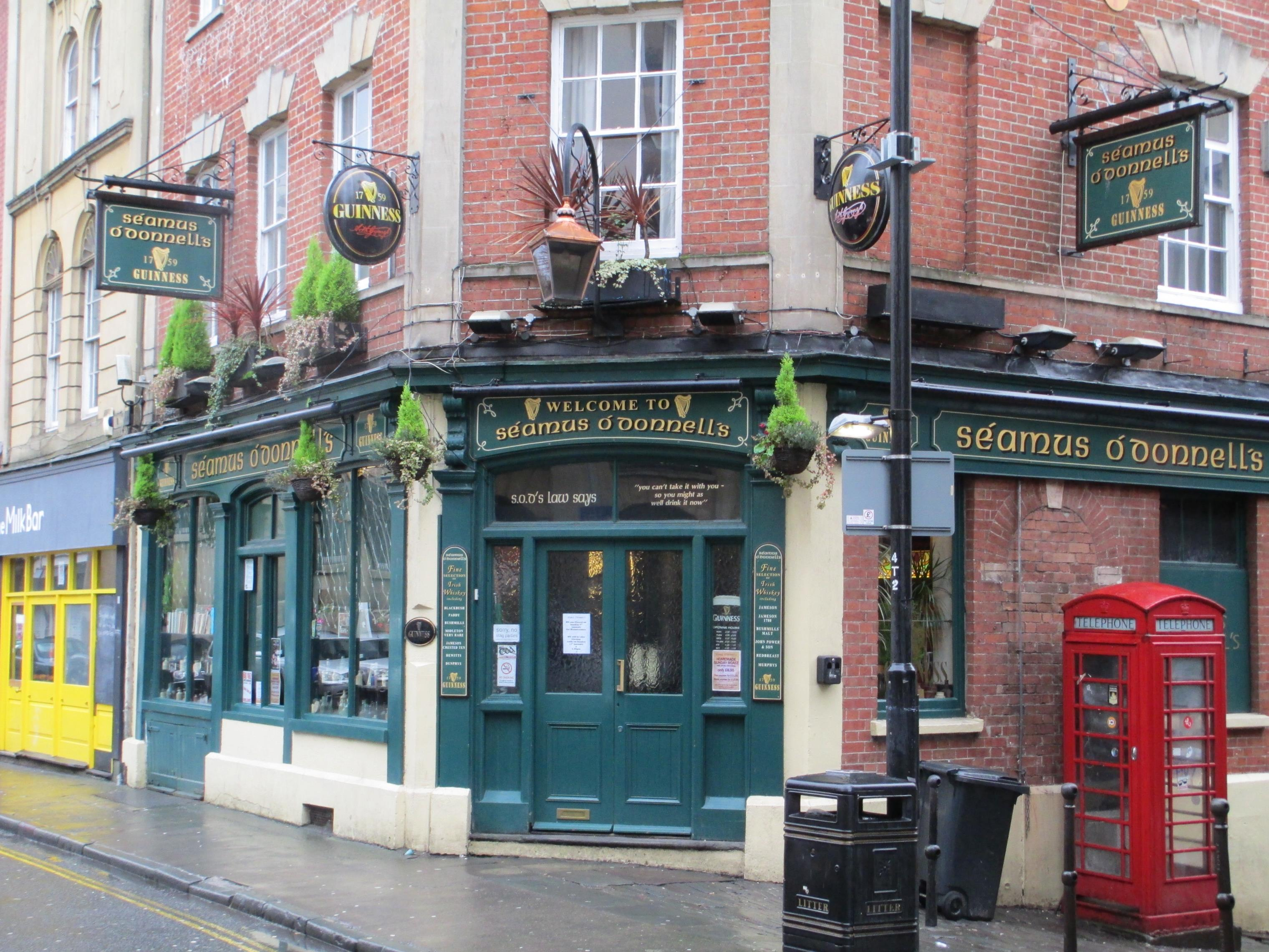
- Seamus O'Donnell's pub in Bristol, in 2014.
- Born: England
- Disappeared: 6 June 2012; Bristol city centre, Bristol, England
- Status: Missing for 13 years, 8 months and 6 days
- Died: Between 6 June and 8 June 2012

Claire Holland was a British woman who disappeared from a pub in Bristol, England on 6 June 2012. In 2023, her former partner Darren Osment was convicted of her murder. No trace of her has been found.

== Disappearance ==
Holland, a 32-year-old woman from Lawrence Weston, vanished after leaving the Seamus O'Donnell's pub in Bristol city centre just after closing time at 23:15 on 6 June 2012. This was the day after the Queen's Diamond Jubilee weekend. She was reported missing a few days later. Holland was the mother of four children.

== Investigation ==
In 2021, Avon and Somerset Police announced that they believed her disappearance was "linked to a crime" and were treating it as suspicious. A 37-year-old man had been arrested on suspicion of murder in 2019, but was released after an investigation. A major search for her body in 2021 failed to find her. The Barrelhouse pub in Bristol was one of the places of interest. Specialist dive teams in Bristol Harbour were involved.

In 2022, a man was rearrested amid "significant developments". Police charged a 41-year-old man with Holland's murder, and his trial was due to begin in October 2022. This was delayed until March 2023.

== Trial, conviction and sentencing ==
The trial of 41-year-old Darren Osment began on 16 October 2023 at Bristol Crown Court. The trial heard that on a night out in Devon, Osment, a former partner of Holland, had dialed 999 and confessed to the operator that he had murdered Holland and said that he was "handing himself in." When police officers arrived Osment claimed that he "didn't do it, but had it arranged." Osment was subsequently arrested and later released under investigation after he had claimed the following day that he did not remember speaking to the officers or dialing 999 as he was "too drunk."

The arrest in 2019 led to police using an undercover officer to attempt to befriend Osment between December 2020 and July 2022. Osment had told the officer that he had strangled Holland before using his "knife skills" to cut open her torso before disposing of the body at Avonmouth Docks. Osment claimed that the "massive overflow" at the time had "weighed down" the body to prevent it from floating back up. Osment also told the officer that he had disposed of the weapon used during the murder by placing it into another chef’s knife box. After being charged and remanded, Osment explained to another prisoner in detail how he had murdered Holland. Osment denied this claim. He had also confessed to a colleague in 2014 that he was "furious" with Holland for "keeping me away from my boy" and that he had strangled her to death and disposed of her body in Bristol. Osment also told another person in 2018 that he had paid someone £500 to execute the mother of his child.

Osment was believed to have murdered Holland due to the fact he thought that she was responsible for their child being taken into foster care. Two years before Holland's disappearance, police were called to their home after he had assaulted her and pushed her down the stairs.

On 11 December 2023, Osment was found guilty of murdering Holland. On 20 December 2023, Osment was sentenced to life imprisonment with a minimum term of 20 years before becoming eligible for parole. Osment will be eligible to apply for parole on 15 January 2044. On 29 April 2024, it was reported that Osment was to appeal against his sentence.

== See also ==
- List of solved missing person cases (post-2000)
- List of murder convictions without a body
