= Paddy Philpott =

Irish hurler

Personal information
- Native name: Pádraig Mac Philib (Irish)
- Born: 30 November 1936 Blackrock, County Cork, Ireland
- Died: 20 March 2016 (aged 79) Florida, United States
- Occupation: Plumber
- Height: 5 ft 10 in (178 cm)

Sport
- Sport: Hurling
- Position: Left wing-back
Club
- Years: Club
- Blackrock
Club titles
- Cork titles: 2
Inter-county*
Years	County	Apps (scores)
1956-1958	Cork	7 (0-00)
Inter-county titles
- Munster titles: 1
- All-Irelands: 0
- NHL: 0
- *Inter County team apps and scores correct as of 20:21, 15 April 2015.

Patrick Philpott (30 November 1936 – 20 March 2016) was an Irish hurler who played as a left wing-back for the Cork senior team.

Born in Blackrock, County Cork, Philpott first arrived on the inter-county scene at the age of seventeen when he first linked up with the Cork minor team. He made his senior debut during the 1956 championship. Philpott immediately became a regular member of the team and won one Munster medal. He was an All-Ireland runner-up on one occasion.

As a member of the Munster inter-provincial team on a number of occasions Philpott won one Railway Cup medal. At club level he was a two-time championship medallist with Blackrock.

Throughout his career Philpott made 7 championship appearances. He retired from inter-county hurling following the conclusion of the 1958 championship.

== Playing career ==
=== Club ===
In 1956 Philpott was a key member of the Blackrock senior team that made a breakthrough after twenty-five years in the doldrums. A 2-10 to 2-2 defeat of Glen Rovers gave Philpott a Cork Senior Hurling Championship medal.

Five years later Blackrock enjoyed further success. A 4-10 to 3-7 defeat of divisional side Avondhu gave Philpott a second championship medal.

=== Inter-county ===
Philpott first played for Cork as a member of the minor hurling team on 23 May 1954 in a 4-6 to 1-4 Munster quarter-final defeat of Waterford.

On 10 June 1956 Philpott made his senior debut in a 5-9 to 2-12 Munster quarter-final defeat of Waterford. He later won a Munster medal after Christy Ring scored a hat trick of goals in the decider to secure a 5-5 to 3-5 victory. Cork subsequently advanced to an All-Ireland final meeting with Wexford on 23 September 1956. The game has gone down in history as one of the all-time classics as Christy Ring was bidding for a record ninth All-Ireland medal. The game turned on one important incident as the Wexford goalkeeper, Art Foley, made a miraculous save from a Ring shot and cleared the sliotar up the field to set up another attack. Nicky Rackard scored a crucial goal with two minutes to go giving Wexford a 2-14 to 2-8 victory.

Philpott's last game for Cork was a 2-6 to 2-4 Munster semi-final defeat by Tipperary on 22 June 1956.

=== Inter-provincial ===
In 1957 Philpott was included on the Munster inter-provincial panel. That year Munster faced arch rivals Leinster in the decider. Philpott was at left wing-back and collected a Railway Cup medal following a 5-7 to 2-5 victory.

== Honours ==
=== Team ===
Blackrock

- Cork Senior Hurling Championship (2): 1956, 1961

Cork

- Munster Senior Hurling Championship (1): 1956

Munster

- Railway Cup (1): 1957
