= Gordon Stuart =

- Born: Gordon Thomas Stuart; 30 May 1924; Toronto, Ontario, Canada
- Died: 22 July 2015 (aged 91); Swansea, Glamorgan, Wales
- Occupation: artist

Gordon Thomas Stuart (30 May 1924 – 22 July 2015) was a Canadian-born Welsh portrait artist, known for his portrayals of Dylan Thomas.

Stuart was born in Toronto, Ontario, Canada and attended Ontario College of Art and Design. He met Thomas in 1953 and completed an oil sketch of Thomas and three oil paintings, one in the National Gallery of Art in London, one at the State University of New York at Buffalo, and one located in the Uplands in Thomas's home.

Stuart also completed portraits of Jimmy Carter, Sir Kyffin Williams, Aeronwy Thomas, Sir George Martin, and Cliff Morgan.

Stuart served in the Canadian Army during World War II and after returning to Canada, later lived in Paris and London before settling in Wales.
