= Norwich sexual abuse ring =

In 2010, police received a report of a child sex ring in Norwich, England. The recurring crimes spanned 10 years and all victims, two boys and three girls, were younger than 13. The perpetrators organized sex parties where adults played card games to decide who would abuse which child. Three members of the gang received significant prison sentences, including ringleader Marie Black, who was jailed for life. Black's sentence made her "one of the UK's most notorious paedophiles."

== Abuse ==
The sexual abuse was committed for ten years in Norwich and London and ended in 2010 when an initial report was made to police and the children were "safeguarded". The children were abused so often that they thought it was "normal" and "that everybody did it". Detective Chief Inspector Peter Hornby said the abuse was "beyond most people's imagination". All victims were younger than 13.

== Operation Moccason ==
The first report of child sexual abuse in Norwich by Marie Black's gang was made to police in 2010. Police responded by "safeguarding" the children, preventing any further abuse. In December 2012, more evidence was given to the police and Operation Moccason was launched. In 2013, police began making arrests. In 2014, police charged 10 suspects with a total of 101 offences.

In 2015, the 10 suspects went on trial. Of the 10, four were convicted and the three ringleaders – Marie Black, Jason Adams and Michael Rogers – received long prison sentences, with Black receiving a life sentence, and Adams and Rogers receiving sentences in excess of 20 years.

Following the trial, Detective Chief Inspector Pete Hornby said the "complicated and protracted" investigation took 28 months. By July 2015, Operation Moccason had involved seven investigators and thousands of documents. 76 statements and 176 exhibits had been used as evidence and many more had been gathered.

DCI Hornby said the operation exposed "a sickening glimpse into sex abuse on a large scale" and investigations were ongoing.

== Sentences ==
Marie Black, Jason Adams, Michael Rogers and Carol Stadler were sentenced on 28 September 2015.

Judge Nicholas Coleman said the defendants are "utterly depraved" and that their crimes defied belief.

Perpetrator	Conviction(s)	Sentence
Marie Black	Rape of a child, conspiracy to rape, inciting a child to engage in sexual activity	Life imprisonment - minimum 24 years
Michael Rogers	Rape, cruelty, inciting a child to engage in sexual activity	24 years
Jason Adams	Rape, cruelty, inciting a child to engage in sexual activity	24 years
Carol Stadler	Assault occasioning actual bodily harm	Six months

Marie Black, who organised the child abuse gatherings, was given a life sentence and must serve at least 24 years. She was tried for 26 offences and found guilty of 23 including rape of a child, conspiracy to rape and inciting a child to engage in sexual activity. Detective Constable Kim Taylor described Black as "cold and calculated". In November 2015, Black lodged an appeal against her conviction and life sentence. This was refused by a single judge in February 2016. She appealed a second time in April 2016. Her second appeal was also refused in May 2016, this time by three judges at the Court of Appeal Criminal Division.

Michael Rogers of Romford and Jason Adams of Norwich were both jailed for 24 years and must serve at least 16 years. They had 14 and 13 convictions respectively, included rape, cruelty and inciting a child to engage in sexual activity.

Carol Stadler from Norwich was jailed for six months for assault occasioning actual bodily harm.
