= Rural parliament =

Rural parliaments are forums for discussion and debate, often established to give voice to rural populations of the country, to influence policy and practice and to develop networks between those in rural areas. They have been established in Estonia, Swedish-speaking Finland, Hungary, the Netherlands, Slovakia, Sweden, and Scotland and will soon be established in Romania.

== List of rural parliaments ==
- Landsbygdsriksdag (Eng: Swedish Rural Parliament; literally Countryside Parliament)), organised by Hela Sverige ska leva (HSSL; Eng: Swedish Village Action Movement; literally: All Sweden Shall Live), Sweden, established 1989
- Landsbygdsriksdag, Finland, established 1990
- Maapäev (Eng: Rural Parliament of Estonian Villages), established 1996, organised by Kodukant( literally, Home Area), Estonia, established 1997
- Vidék Parlementje (Eng: Hungarian Rural Parliament), Hungary, established 1998
- Vidiecky Parlament (VIPA), Slovakia, established 2000 informally, 2001 formal NGO
- PlattelandsParlement, the Netherlands, established 2005
- Slovenski podeželski parliament, Slovenia, established 2011
- Parlamentul Rural din România (Eng: Romanian Rural Parliament), established 2014 informally

=== Scotland ===
In March 2012 Rural Affairs Secretary Richard Lochhead announced that the Scottish Government was moving ahead with its plans for a Scottish rural parliament, as outlined in Programme for Scotland 2011–2012.

The inaugural Scottish Rural Parliament was held from 6–8 November 2014, in Oban, Argyll & Bute.

An independent organization, Scottish Rural Action, was formed to take forward the proposals. Directors include the chair, John Hutchison of Community Land Scotland, who is a Community Advocate based in the West Highlands. He also chairs the Isle of Eigg Heritage Trust and is former Chairman of the John Muir Trust.

The themes or topics for the Rural Parliament will be decided by people who live and work in rural Scotland using a survey.
