= Moc Morgan =

Welsh television presenter and naturalist

- Born: Morgan John Morgan; 7 November 1928; Pontrhydfendigaid, Wales
- Died: 25 May 2015 (aged 86); Aberystwyth, Wales
- Occupations: Headmaster; angler; writer; broadcaster

Morgan John "Moc" Morgan OBE (7 November 1928 – 25 May 2015) was a Welsh fly fisherman, administrator, naturalist and television presenter. Born into a rural family, Morgan became a head teacher, but his love of fly-fishing led him into media opportunities in Welsh radio and television. One of the definitive writers of books relating to fly-fishing within Wales, Morgan became an important administrator in Welsh, British and European aspects of the sport.

== Personal life ==
Morgan was born in 1928 in Pontrhydfendigaid, Dyfed in Wales, he was the second eldest of five siblings, whose father was a railway worker. He was raised as a Welsh speaker, learning English upon starting education. He worked on a hill farm as a youth, but on leaving secondary education he matriculated to Trinity College, Carmarthenshire. After completing his education he undertook national service and on returning to Wales he took up the position of teacher at Pontrhydfendigaid School. He rose to the position of headmaster and later took up a headmaster post in Lampeter Primary School.

Morgan was married twice. First to Meirion with whom he has a son, Hywel. Meirion died from cancer in 2001, and Morgan remarried, to Julia and the couple moved to Aberystwyth. Some years before his death, Morgan was diagnosed with cancer and he died at his home on 25 May 2015.

== Career as an angler ==
Morgan grew up in an area rich in pastoral tradition, including shooting and poaching, but it was angling to which Morgan was drawn. As a youth he was taken under the wing by renowned local fisherman, Dai Lewis, of whom Morgan would write of in Nyng Nghysgod Dai (In Dai's Shadow). Lewis, whom Morgan described as "one of the giants of the fishing world", bought the young Morgan his first fishing licence and also allowed him to shadow him on his fishing trips.

As an adult Morgan would continue his passion for fishing and despite being a teacher, Morgan would spend his lunchtimes, his trips back from school and into the night fishing in the local rivers. His favoured fish was sea trout, and he would spend his summers on the River Teifi as they returned to their spawning grounds. He also passed on his love of fishing to his son Hywel, who became World and European Casting champion.

In the 1960s Morgan was invited onto a Welsh television programme as a guest to discuss his pastime. This led to him hosting a radio show on Radio Cymru called Country Life. He later worked on television for S4C and presented two of his own programmes Gwlad Moc (Moc's Country) and Byd Moc (Moc's World). In 2014 he was the subject of a three-part documentary screened on S4C. He was also a notable author on rural affairs and fly-fishing. He wrote an autobiography Byd Moc in Welsh, as well as several English volumes, including Fly Patterns for the Rivers and Lakes of Wales (1984) and Trout and Salmon Flies of Wales (1996). In his later life he also contributed a column to the Western Mail newspaper.

In June 1986 the former American president Jimmy Carter and his wife Rosalynn were visiting friends in mid Wales. Carter, a keen fly-fisher, asked for a local guide and Morgan was recommended to him. The two men spent the evening fishing and a few days later the two men met again to fish for rainbow trout on a local lake. In 1991 Morgan was awarded the OBE after organising the World Fly Fishing Championship in Wales.

In his later life Morgan became an administrator for his pastime. He was three times president of the International Fly Fishing Association and head of the Fly Fishing for the Disabled. He saw fishing as a hobby and sport for all and was a keen advocate of women and children enjoying fly-fishing. Closer to home he was chairman and president of the Welsh Salmon and Sea Trout Association. Morgan was also a founder chairman of the Federation of Welsh Anglers.

== Published works ==
- Fishing (1977)
- Fly Patterns for the Rivers and Lakes of Wales (1984)
- Successful Sea Trout Angling: The Practical Guide (1989) with Graeme Harris
- Fishing in Wales: A guide to the lakes & rivers of rural Wales (1990)
- Trout and Salmon Flies of Wales (1996)
- Arweinlyfr pysgotwyr i bysgota yn ardal Tregaron (1999) with Robert Allen
- Yng Nghysod Dai (1967)
