= Colum Corless =

Irish hurler

Personal information
- Native name: Colum Mac Corluis (Irish)
- Born: 12 May 1922 Kinvara, County Galway, Ireland
- Died: 1 February 2015 (aged 92) Donnybrook, Ireland
- Occupation: ESB employee
- Height: 5 ft 11 in (180 cm)

Sport
- Sport: Hurling
- Position: Right corner-back
Clubs
- Years: Club
- Kinvara, Ardrahan Faughs, Southern Gaels, Harry Boland
Club titles
- Galway titles: 0
College(s)
- Years: College
- Football and Hurling Finals
Inter-county
- Years: County
- 1948–1954: Galway
Inter-county titles
- All-Irelands: 0
- NHL: 1

Colum Corless (12 May 1922 – 1 February 2015) was an Irish hurler who played as a right corner-back for the Galway senior team.

Born in Kinvara, County Galway, Corless first played competitive hurling during his schooling at St. Mary's College. He arrived on the inter-county scene at the age of seventeen when he first linked up with the Galway minor team. He played on the Connacht Colleges Football team that won the All Ireland Honours in 1940. In 1941 he Captained the Connacht Hurling team to glory. He made his senior debut in 1943, and played on the 1944 championship. Corless immediately became a regular member of the starting fifteen. In 1949 he won a championship with Ardrahan. Their proudest moment arrived in late 1951 when they made the epic trip to New York, beat the locals 2-11 over 2-8 and thus captured the 1950/51 National Hurling League title. Colum won Oireachtas medals with Galway in 1950 and 1952. Colum Corless wore the number two jersey. Wexford were outscored 6-7 to 3-4 in the Home Final.

He won his second National Hurling League medal in 1954. He was an All-Ireland runner-up on one occasion. He played with Galway in New York and Chicago, the Harry Boland club. In 1956 he added a Dublin Senior Championship to his collection with Faughs Club. In 1966 he won an Intermediate Championship with Kinvara. In 1977 he won the Westmeath junior hurling championship with Southern Gaels (aged 56): he was an inspirational player and his enthusiasm was infectious.

in 1979 he was awarded the Hall of Fame. He commenced marathon running in 1984, and completed 11 marathons (Dublin, Belfast, The Hague, Boston and New York) and many 10ks. In 1999 Corless took part in the National Veterans Championship in Tullamore winning Gold in the 100mt, 200mt, and 800mt, with Silver in the Shot Put and Bronze in the 400mt. In 2000, aged 78, he improved, with Gold in the 100, 200, 400, 800 and Shot Put. He went on to set the National record for the 800mt and was only .05mm outside the record for the Shot Put.

Colum ran many 10k runs, and last competed at the age of 84 in the "Loughrea 5" completing it with ease. Corless was a member of the Connacht inter-provincial team on a number of occasions. At club level he played with Kinvara.

His brother, James Corless, also played with Galway.

== Honours ==
=== Player ===
Connacht Colleges

- All-Ireland Senior Interprovincial Colleges Championship (1): 1941

Both Football and Hurling

Galway

- National Hurling League (1): 1950-51

1954
