= Frank Brennan (economist) =

Irish author (1947–2015)

Frank Brennan (15 December 1947 – 1 September 2015) was an Irish author.

== Accomplishments ==
Throughout his lifetime, Brennan earned himself a reputation as being "the widely respected economist and tax consultant who designed the blueprint for tackling Ireland's black economy in the early 1990s." He did this through his well-researched paper that explained how to harness black money "to kick-start an otherwise stagnant economy."

== Publications ==
- A Company Purchasing its own Shares, 1991
- Brennan & Howley tax acts commentary : 2000–2001
- Brennan & Howley tax acts commentary : 2001–2002

He also coauthored the Tax Commentary for many years.
