= 1977 in Ireland =

- Centuries: 18th; 19th; 20th; 21st
- Decades: 1950s; 1960s; 1970s; 1980s; 1990s
- See also: 1977 in Northern Ireland; Other events of 1977; List of years in Ireland

Events from the year 1977 in Ireland.

== Incumbents ==
- President: Patrick Hillery
- Taoiseach:
  - Liam Cosgrave (FG) (until 5 July 1977)
  - Jack Lynch (FF) (from 5 July 1977)
- Tánaiste:
  - Brendan Corish (Lab) (until 5 July 1977)
  - George Colley (FF) (from 5 July 1977)
- Minister for Finance:
  - Richie Ryan (FG) (until 5 July 1977)
  - George Colley (FF) (from 5 July 1977)
- Chief Justice: Tom O'Higgins
- Dáil:
  - 20th (until 25 May 1977)
  - 21st (from 5 July 1977)
- Seanad:
  - 13th (until 26 May 1977)
  - 14th (from 27 October 1977)

== Events ==
=== January ===
- 29 January – Seven Irish Republican Army bombs exploded in the West End of London, but there were no fatalities or serious injuries.

=== February ===
- 4 February – British police discovered an IRA bomb factory in Liverpool.
- 10 February – The three IRA terrorists involved in the 1975 Balcombe Street Siege in London were sentenced to life imprisonment on six charges of murder.
- 21 February – A crater on the planet Mercury was named after the Irish poet W. B. Yeats.

=== March ===
- 18 March – Six-year-old Mary Boyle from Kincasslagh vanished from her grandparents' farm near Ballyshannon in County Donegal.

=== May ===
- 9 May – Ireland's first McDonald's restaurant opened on Grafton Street in Dublin.
- 26 May – Five soldiers were killed in the Glen of Imaal military training area in County Wicklow when an 81mm mortar exploded during a training exercise.
- 29 May – A massive peace rally took place in Belfast organized by Betty Williams, Mairéad Corrigan and Ciarán McKeown.

=== June ===
- 15 June – Fianna Fáil won the 1977 general election with over 50 percent of the votes and a 20-seat majority.

=== July ===
- 5 July – The 21st Dáil elected Jack Lynch as Taoiseach.
- 14 July – The Royal College of Surgeons in Ireland was recognised as a college of the National University of Ireland.

=== August ===
- 10 August – Queen Elizabeth II visited Northern Ireland under tight security as part of her Silver Jubilee celebrations.

=== September ===
- 10 September – Irish horses were prevented from entering the United States because of an outbreak of venereal disease in Irish, British and French horses.
- 18 September – In Ennis, County Clare, the Christian Brothers celebrated their 150th anniversary.

=== October ===
- 3 October – Fire broke out during the early hours at Dunsink Observatory near Finglas in Dublin. The building was badly damaged, and computing and electronic equipment was destroyed. Photographic plates, slides, and other photographic material were lost, along with many library contents including historical journals, textbooks, reference materials, and catalogues. Rubble removed to the nearby municipal dump included valuable Apollo 11 moonrock fragments donated to Ireland by the American government.
- 22 October – A new £1 note was circulated, a green banknote depicting the mythical Queen Maeve of Connacht.

=== November ===
- 18 November
  - The National Council for Educational Awards was given degree awarding status.
  - Following an eight-day visit to Ireland, Lillian Carter, the 79-year-old mother of the sitting United States president, Jimmy Carter, had a delayed departure when the Irish Transport and General Workers Union ground crew at Dublin Airport refused to service her departure plane at the request of the American Teamsters Union during its dispute with the aircraft charter company, Trans‐International Airways.

== Arts and literature ==
- August – The Boomtown Rats' debut single "Lookin' After No. 1", written by Bob Geldof, was released in the United Kingdom.
- The Rooney Prize for Irish Literature was awarded to Desmond Hogan.
- Publication of Leland Bardwell's first novel Girl on a Bicycle in Dublin, set in 1940s Ireland.
- Publication of Paul Muldoon's poetry collection Mules.
- Publication of Niall Ó Dónaill's Irish-English dictionary Foclóir Gaeilge-Béarla.

== Sport ==
=== Association football ===
- The Republic of Ireland national football team failed to qualify for the 1978 FIFA World Cup in Argentina.

=== Gaelic sport ===
- In September, Cork Hurlers completed the 'three in a row' by beating Wexford in the All-Ireland senior hurling final.
- Dublin footballers beat Armagh in the highest ever scoring All-Ireland senior football final.

=== Golf ===
- Carroll's Irish Open was won by Hubert Green (USA).

== Births ==
- January – Mickey O'Connell, Cork hurler.
- 4 January – Dan Shanahan, hurler and coach.
- 6 January
  - David Flynn, composer and musician.
  - Genevieve O'Reilly, actress.
- 7 January – Tomm Moore, twice Oscar-nominated animator and film maker.
- 10 January – Michelle O'Neill, née Doris, politician, First Minister of Northern Ireland.
- 7 February – Francis Barrett, boxer.
- 15 February – Damien Faulkner, motor racing driver.
- 16 February – Ian Clarke, software developer.
- 3 March – Ronan Keating, singer.
- 7 March – Ronan O'Gara, International rugby player.
- 16 March – Donal Óg Cusack, Cork hurling goalkeeper.
- 31 March – Finghin Collins, pianist.
- 1 April – Pádraic Joyce, Galway Gaelic footballer.
- 14 April
  - Stephen Grant, association footballer.
  - Trevor Malloy, association footballer.
- 19 April – Morgan McSweeney, UK political advisor.
- 7 May – Lisa Kelly, singer.
- 8 May – Joe Doyle, bass player.
- 9 May – Paul Lynch, novelist.
- 12 May – Barry Foley, Limerick hurler.
- 16 May – Robbie Ryan, association footballer.
- 22 May – Seán Óg Ó hAilpín, Cork hurling and Gaelic football player
- 1 June
  - Thomas Byrne, Fianna Fáil Teachta Dála (TD) for Meath East.
  - Jamie Costin, race walker.
- 15 June – P. J. Ryan, Kilkenny hurler.
- 20 June – Hazel Kaneswaran, singer.
- 21 June
  - Barry Archer, cricketer.
  - Michael Gomez, boxer.
- 25 June – Daniel Kinahan, boxing promoter.
- 2 July – Laura Woods, radio and television presenter.
- 6 July – Pearse Doherty, Sinn Féin Senator.
- 27 July – Jonathan Rhys Meyers, actor.
- 9 August – Caroline Morahan, actress and television presenter.
- 14 August – Tom Mulligan, Dublin Gaelic footballer (died 2007).
- 17 August – Colin Hawkins, association footballer.
- 18 August – Elaine Crowley, journalist, newsreader and television presenter.
- 21 August – Anthony Lynch, Cork Gaelic footballer.
- 25 August – Dessie Baker, association footballer.
- 31 August – Ian Harte, international association footballer.
- 7 September
  - Marcus Horan, international rugby player.
  - Timmy McCarthy, Cork hurling player.
- 15 September – Gavin Smith, motor racing driver.
- 15 November – Joe Deane, Cork hurling player.
- 3 December – Kerri Ann, pop singer.
- 11 December – Emma Ledden, television presenter.
- 13 December – Peter Stringer, rugby union player for Munster and Ireland.
- 27 December
  - Sinéad Keenan, actress.
  - Siobhán McSweeney, actress.

Full date unknown
- John Browne, Cork hurler.
- Stephen Byrne, Offaly hurler.
- Ste V Roc, hip-hop artist and MC.
- Anthony Ruby, artist.

== Deaths ==
- 5 January – Patrick Cogan, Independent TD (born 1903).
- 17 April – William Conway, Cardinal Archbishop of Armagh (born 1913).
- 24 April – Geoffrey Bing, lawyer and Labour politician in UK (born 1909).
- 14 June – Joe Keppel, comic performer (born 1894).
- 14 July – Fiona Plunkett, Republican (born 1896).
- 17 July – Micky Cross, hurler (Claughaun, Limerick, Munster, national team) (born 1902).
- 1 August – Bill Loughery, cricketer (born 1907).
- 21 December – Seán Keating, painter (born 1889).
- 23 December – Raymond McGrath, architect and interior designer (born 1903 in Australia).
- 26 December – Jimmy Walsh, Kilkenny hurler (born 1911).

== See also ==
- 1977 in Irish television
