= 1977 in Northern Ireland =

- Centuries: 20th; 21st
- Decades: 1950s; 1960s; 1970s; 1980s; 1990s
- See also: 1977 in the United Kingdom; 1977 in Ireland; Other events of 1977; List of years in Northern Ireland

Events during the year 1977 in Northern Ireland.

== Incumbents ==
- Secretary of State - Roy Mason

== Events ==
- The overt British Army lead in security policy is scaled back in favour of police primacy during the year.
- 29 May - A massive peace rally takes place in Belfast organized by Betty Williams, Mairéad Corrigan and Ciarán McKeown.
- May - Shankill Butchers are arrested.
- 10 August - Elizabeth II visits Northern Ireland as part of her Silver Jubilee celebrations under tight security.
- September - Rev. Ian Paisley launches the Save Ulster from Sodomy campaign to oppose the decriminalisation of homosexuality.
- 10 October - The Peace Movement founders, Mairéad Corrigan and Betty Williams win the Nobel Peace Prize.

== Sport ==
=== Football ===
- Irish League

Winners: Glentoran

- Irish Cup

Winners: Coleraine 4 - 1 Linfield

=== Golf ===
- Moyola Park Golf Club is founded.

== Births ==
- 4 January - Tim Wheeler, singer-songwriter and guitarist.
- 7 January - Tomm Moore, twice Oscar nominated animator and film maker.
- 10 January - Michelle O'Neill, Sinn Féin leader.
- 10 March - Colin Murray, radio DJ.
- 16 July - Bryan Budd, Parachute Regiment Corporal, posthumously awarded the Victoria Cross (killed on active service 2006 in Afghanistan).
- 10 August - Danny Griffin, footballer.
- 23 August - Davy Larmour, footballer.
- 11 September - Enda Muldoon, Gaelic footballer.
- 15 October - Paul McKee, sprint athlete.
- 6 December - Paul McVeigh, footballer.
- 16 December - Darren Fitzgerald, footballer.

== Deaths ==
- 3 March - Brian Faulkner, Baron Faulkner of Downpatrick, sixth and last Prime Minister of Northern Ireland, Ulster Unionist Party MP (born 1921).
- 17 April - William Conway, Cardinal Archbishop of Armagh (born 1913).
- 24 April - Geoffrey Bing, lawyer and Labour politician in UK (born 1909).
- 2 June - Stephen Boyd, actor (born 1931).
- 1 August - Bill Loughery, cricketer (born 1907).

== See also ==
- 1977 in Scotland
- 1977 in Wales
