= 1971 in Northern Ireland =

- Centuries: 20th; 21st
- Decades: 1950s; 1960s; 1970s; 1980s; 1990s
- See also: 1971 in the United Kingdom; 1971 in Ireland; Other events of 1971; List of years in Northern Ireland

Events during the year 1971 in Northern Ireland.

== Incumbents ==
- Governor - The Lord Grey of Naunton
- Prime Minister - James Chichester-Clark (until 23 March), Brian Faulkner (from 23 March)

== Events ==
- 6 February – Gunner Robert Curtis becomes the first British Army soldier to be killed in The Troubles.
- 15 February – Decimal Day: The United Kingdom and Republic of Ireland both switch to decimal currency.
- 10 March – 1971 Scottish soldiers' killings: Three young off-duty Royal Highland Fusiliers are lured from a bar in Belfast and shot by the Provisional Irish Republican Army.
- 20 March – Maj. James Chichester-Clark resigns as Prime Minister of Northern Ireland. He is succeeded on 23 March by Brian Faulkner.
- 16 July – The Social Democratic and Labour Party (SDLP) announces that it is withdrawing from the Parliament of Northern Ireland.
- 9 August – Internment without trial is introduced in Northern Ireland. In Operation Demetrius, over 300 republicans are 'lifted' in pre-dawn raids. Some loyalists are later arrested. Twenty people die in riots that follow.
- 9–11 August – Ballymurphy massacre: Members of 1st Battalion, Parachute Regiment of the British Army kill 10 civilians in the Springfield Road area of west Belfast during Operation Demetrius; the victims are found by an inquest held in 2018–21 to be "entirely innocent".
- 12 August – British troops begin clearing operations in Belfast following the worst rioting in years. Taoiseach Jack Lynch calls for an end to the Stormont administration.
- 27 September – Prime ministers Edward Heath, Jack Lynch and Brian Faulkner meet at Chequers to discuss the Northern Ireland situation.
- 30 October – The Democratic Unionist Party is founded by the Rev. Ian Paisley.
- 19 November – Taoiseach Jack Lynch has talks with Prime Minister of the United Kingdom Harold Wilson in Dublin.
- 4 December – The McGurk's Bar bombing, carried out by the Ulster Volunteer Force in Belfast, kills fifteen people, the highest death toll from a single incident in the city during The Troubles.

== Arts and literature ==
- 5 March – Ulster Hall, Belfast, becomes the first place in which Led Zeppelin play their iconic song "Stairway to Heaven".
- Paul Muldoon publishes his first poetry collection Knowing My Place.
- Frank Ormsby publishes his first poetry collection Ripe for Company.
- Blackstaff Press established in Belfast.

== Sport ==
=== Football ===
- Irish League

Winners: Linfield

- Irish Cup

Winners: Distillery 3 – 0 Derry City

== Births ==
- 31 January – Patrick Kielty, comedian and television presenter.
- 1 February – Alan Fettis, footballer.
- 5 June – Susan Lynch, actress.
- 6 June – Siobhan Keegan, Lady Chief Justice of Northern Ireland.
- 25 June – Neil Lennon, footballer.
- 13 July – Eamonn Magee, boxer.
- 2 August
  - Michael Hughes, footballer.
  - Anthony Tohill, Gaelic footballer.
- 10 September – David Humphreys, Ireland international rugby union footballer.
- 12 December – Naomi Long, née Johnston, Alliance Party leader and MLA.
- Full date unknown – Darran Lindsay, motorcycle road racer (killed in practice 2006).

== Deaths ==
- 24 January – St. John Greer Ervine, dramatist and author (born 1883).
- 15 May – Billy Reid, volunteer in Provisional Irish Republican Army, killed in gunfight with British Army (born 1939).
- 14 June – Gerard Dillon, artist (born 1916).
- 27 July – Charlie Tully, footballer (born 1924).

== See also ==
- 1971 in Scotland
- 1971 in Wales
