= 1982 in Northern Ireland =

- Centuries: 20th; 21st
- Decades: 1960s; 1970s; 1980s; 1990s; 2000s
- See also: 1982 in the United Kingdom; 1982 in Ireland; Other events of 1982; List of years in Northern Ireland

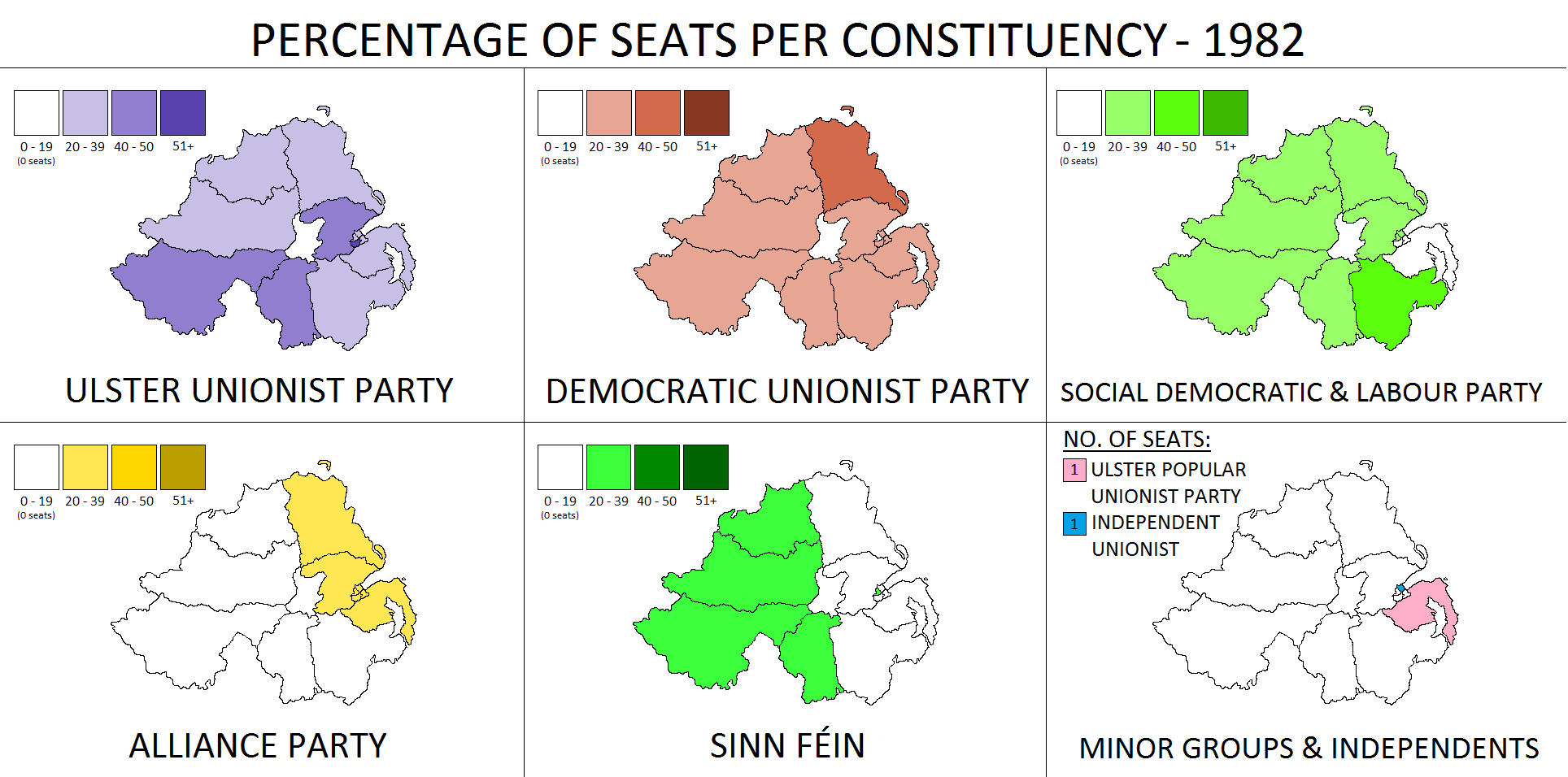
Map showing the results of the 1982 Northern Ireland Assembly election

Events during the year 1982 in Northern Ireland.

== Incumbents ==
- Secretary of State - Jim Prior

== Events ==
- 29 January - the well-known loyalist, John McKeague was shot dead in his Belfast shop by the INLA
- 19 February - The DeLorean Car factory in Belfast is put into receivership.
- 23 February - Attacks on shipping in Lough Foyle (1981-1982): Glasgow-registered coal ship St. Bedan is bombed and sunk by a Provisional Irish Republican Army unit driving a hijacked pilot boat in Lough Foyle.
- 6 April - James Prior launches 'rolling devolution' for Northern Ireland.
- April 1982 the Thatcher government published its White Paper on Northern Ireland.
- 10 May - Seamus Mallon of the Social Democratic and Labour Party (SDLP) is appointed to Seanad Éireann.
- 20 October - Polling takes place in the Northern Ireland Assembly election. Sinn Féin wins its first five seats in the Assembly, with Gerry Adams representing Belfast West (announced 21 October).
- 27 October
  - Three RUC officers are killed by an IRA bomb near Lurgan.
  - The Homosexual Offences (Northern Ireland) Order 1982 comes into effect, decriminalising homosexuality in Northern Ireland for those aged 18 or older.
- 11 November - The killing of three unarmed IRA members at an RUC checkpoint in Craigavon, County Armagh.
- 24 November - The killing, by an RUC undercover unit, of Michael Tighe and the wounding of his friend Martin McCauley at an IRA arms cache on a farm near Lurgan, County Armagh.
- 12 December - The killing at an RUC checkpoint in Mullacreavie, County Armagh, of two INLA members, Seamus Grew and Roddy Carroll. The shootings are initially investigated by other members of the RUC, and the Director of Public Prosecutions for Northern Ireland decides to bring prosecutions. At the first trial, Constable John Robinson admits to having been instructed to lie in his statements, and that other witnesses had similarly altered their stories to provide justification for opening fire on Grew and Carroll. When Robinson is found not guilty, the resulting public outcry causes RUC Chief Constable John Hermon to ask John Stalker to investigate the killings. On 5 June 1986, just before Stalker is to make his final report, he is removed from his position in charge of the inquiry.
- 6 December - Droppin Well bombing: The Irish National Liberation Army kills seventeen people in a bomb attack at the Droppin Well Inn, Ballykelly, County Londonderry.

== Arts and literature ==
- 22 April - Graham Reid's play The Hidden Curriculum, set in West Belfast, is premiered at the Abbey Theatre, Dublin.
- Anne Devlin wins the Hennessy Literary Award for her short story, Passages, which is adapted for television as A Woman Calling.
- Medbh McGuckian's poetry collection The Flower Master is published.

== Sport ==
=== Football ===
- Football World Cup
  - Group stage
    - Northern Ireland 0-0 Yugoslavia
    - Northern Ireland 1-1 Honduras
    - Northern Ireland 1-0 Spain
      - Northern Ireland qualify for the quarterfinals of the World Cup
  - Second group stage
    - Northern Ireland 2-2 Austria
    - Northern Ireland 1-0 France
    - Northern Ireland are knocked out at the quarter final stage of the World Cup
- Irish League

Winners: Linfield

- Irish Cup

Winners: Linfield 2 - 1 Coleraine

=== Motorcycling ===
- Joey Dunlop wins the Formula One motorcycle world championship for the first time.

=== Rugby Union ===
- The Ireland rugby team wins the Triple Crown for the first time since 1949 by beating Scotland 21-12 on 21 February, having already beaten Wales and England.

=== Snooker ===
- Alex Higgins wins the World Professional Snooker Championship for the second time.

== Births ==
- 27 January - Brian Close, footballer.
- 20 February - Caoimhe Archibald, Sinn Féin MLA.
- 25 February - Chris Baird, footballer.
- 2 March - Daithí McKay, Sinn Féin MLA.
- 11 March - Kyle Anderson, singer (Six).
- 1 May - Jamie Dornan, actor, model and musician
- 1 July - Kiera Chaplin, actress and model, granddaughter of Charlie Chaplin.
- 10 July - Mark Morrison, ice hockey player.
- 5 October - Rónán Clarke, Gaelic footballer.

=== Full date unknown ===
- Jamie Dornan, model, musician and actor.
- Máire Nic an Bhaird, teacher and Irish language activist.

== Deaths ==
- 5 February - George Crothers, cricketer (born 1909).
- 26 March - Sam Kydd, actor (born 1915).
- 14 August - Patrick Magee, actor (born 1922).
- 16 November - Lenny Murphy, loyalist paramilitary and leader of the Shankill Butchers (born 1952).

== See also ==
- 1982 in England
- 1982 in Scotland
- 1982 in Wales
