= Robert Curtis (British Army soldier) =

British soldier (1950–1971)

- Born: 25 March 1950; Newcastle upon Tyne, England
- Died: 6 February 1971 (aged 20); New Lodge, Belfast, Northern Ireland
- Burial place: West Road Cemetery, Newcastle, United Kingdom
- Military career
- Allegiance: United Kingdom
- Branch: British Army
- Rank: Gunner
- Nicknames: Geordie, Rob, Robbie
- Service number: 24181317
- Units: 156 (Inkerman) Battery, 94 Locating Regiment, Royal Artillery

Robert George Curtis (25 March 1950 – 6 February 1971) was a British soldier who was officially the first military fatality in the Northern Ireland "Troubles", which was to kill 705 British soldiers. He was the first British soldier to die in the line of duty on the island of Ireland since 1921. The gunman responsible is believed to be Provisional IRA member Billy Reid, who was killed later that year in a gunfight.

== Death ==
156 (Inkerman) Battery, 94 Locating Regiment, Royal Artillery was deployed to Northern Ireland on 5 January 1971 under the command of 32nd Regiment Royal Artillery. During the first week of February 1971, there was major violence in many Irish republican areas of Belfast when the British Army launched a series of searches for IRA arms. Rioting in the republican area of the New Lodge escalated and reinforcements were called for. 156 Battery was ordered into the area.

A large crowd gathered at the junction of New Lodge Road and Lepper Street. A troop of soldiers from 156 Battery, including Gunner Rob Curtis, were deployed to disperse the crowd. As the troop moved to the junction they were attacked with a barrage of stones and bottles by the mob and deployed in “riot-formation” with shields as protection. Subsequently, a nail bomb was thrown at the troop and in the aftermath of the blast the crowd split allowing a gunman to fire a long burst of automatic fire from a Sterling submachine gun, probably from the base of Templar House. The crowd then reformed, allowing the gunman to escape. Gunner Curtis was hit by a ricochet which passed through the shoulder opening of his flak jacket, penetrating his heart. He died almost instantly. Four other troop members were wounded, one seriously.

== Status ==
Curtis was, at the time of his death, 20 years old and married for just over a year. His wife was expecting their first child and had just informed him in a letter that he was to become a father. He is laid to rest in West Road Cemetery, Newcastle-upon-Tyne, England. He was the first officially recognised fatality that the army suffered as a direct result of IRA actions. Unofficially 21 other military personnel died or were killed before his death. On the morning after his death Sir James Chichester-Clark, then Prime Minister of Northern Ireland, announced that “Northern Ireland is at war with the Irish Republican Army Provisionals”.

Some sources claim the shots were fired from a Thompson submachine gun, but some eyewitnesses are sure that it was a Sterling SMG that was fired. His wife was later compensated to the sum of £6500 together with £1500 for her daughter. His daughter was married wearing her father's wedding ring and later named her son Robert in honour of his grandfather.

== Reports ==
A report by Tim Magee, an eyewitness, follows:

Part of 156 Bty called out for riot control in New Lodge area. Departed HMS Maidstone where we were billetted, and de-bussed at northern end of Lepper street. Very large explosion as we moved down Lepper St towards New Lodge Road. I was on left flank, close to houses, very uncomfortable every time we passed one of the many narrow alleys leading off the road, seemed like ideal hiding place for attackers. When we reached New Lodge Road a lot of rioting going on, initially we cordoned NLR off, stones, bottles incoming in large quantities, also nail bombs (multiple as I recall, not just one as is often reported).

Together with 4/5 others sent across NLR to cordon off Duncairn Parade. Whilst standing there, an overweight guy in white shirt and dark jacket came around corner of tower block on our left (part of Artillery flats), took aim with pistol and fired off several shots. We found this highly amusing and started laughing at his attempt to frighten us with a starting pistol. He looked somewhat surprised and ran back behind the flats. Some time later that night we were pulled back and started to move back up Lepper street. I don't recall if we were in the much discussed “box formation” but we were certainly arrayed across the road. Not far from the junction with Spamount street someone opened up from behind us with automatic fire. This time I was on the right flank. I felt a blow to my RH side, could see sparks coming off the cobble stones and wall to my right and decided to get the f! out of it, so ran around the corner to the right and into Spamount street.

With the passage of time I forget exactly who was hit, Geordie of course, John Finch was hit in the abdomen, Pete Fishbourne (think that was his name) was hit in the backside. My recollection is that the newspapers reported 5 or 6 but that probably included Bob Reding. Heinz Pizarek (sic) found a spent round in the back of his webbing belt when he got back to HMS Maidstone.
