= 1985 in Northern Ireland =

- Centuries: 20th; 21st
- Decades: 1960s; 1970s; 1980s; 1990s; 2000s
- See also: 1985 in the United Kingdom; 1985 in Ireland; Other events of 1985; List of years in Northern Ireland

Events during the year 1985 in Northern Ireland.

== Incumbents ==
- Secretary of State - Douglas Hurd (until 3 September), Tom King (from 3 September)

== Events ==
- 28 February - 1985 Newry mortar attack: The Provisional Irish Republican Army carries out a mortar attack on the Royal Ulster Constabulary police station in Corry Square at Newry, killing nine officers in the highest loss of life for the RUC on a single day.
- 3 July - Thousands of Loyalists demonstrate against a proposed Royal Ulster Constabulary (RUC) decision to re-route a church parade away from the 'Tunnel' (the Catholic Obins Street) area of Portadown.
- 6 July - RUC decide to allow a church parade through the area, but impose a ban on similar marches on 12 and 13 July.
- 7 July - Serious clashes occur in Portadown between Nationalist protesters and police as the parade of 2,500 Orangeman, passes through the Catholic Obins Street. Eight policemen are injured and three people arrested.
- 12–13 July - Further rioting in Portadown, this time between Loyalists and the RUC, as the Orange Order and Royal Black Institution parades are re-routed from the 'Tunnel' area. 52 policemen are injured and 43 people arrested during these two days of rioting.
- 15 November - Taoiseach Garret FitzGerald, and the British Prime Minister, Margaret Thatcher, sign the Anglo-Irish Agreement at Hillsborough Castle, County Down. Treasury Minister Ian Gow resigns in protest at the deal.
- 23 November - A mass rally of Democratic Unionist and Ulster Unionist Party members against the Anglo-Irish Agreement is held outside Belfast City Hall under the slogan Ulster Says No.

== Arts and literature ==
- 24 October - Anne Devlin's play Ourselves Alone is performed for the first time.
- Castleward Opera stages its first annual opera festival at Castle Ward, a National Trust house near Strangford in County Down, with a performance of Così fan tutte.
- Gerry Anderson begins broadcasting on BBC Radio Foyle from Derry.
- The last native speaker of Rathlin Island Irish dies.

== Sport ==
=== Football ===
- Irish League

Winners: Linfield

- Irish Cup

Winners: Glentoran 1 - 1, 1 - 0 Linfield

- Derry City F.C. joins the League of Ireland, having been out of senior football since 1972.

=== Motorcycling ===
- Robert Dunlop wins 250cc race at the Cookstown 100.

=== Rugby Union ===
- 30 March - The Irish rugby team wins the Triple Crown and Five Nations Championship at Lansdowne Road. They beat England 13.

=== Snooker ===
- 28 April - Dennis Taylor wins the Embassy World Snooker Championship.

== Births ==
- 1 January - Steven Davis, footballer
- 1 February - Dean Shiels, footballer
- 3 March - Sam Morrow, footballer
- 29 May - Jeff Hughes, footballer
- 15 June - Nadine Coyle, singer
- 29 June - Conall Murtagh, footballer
- 23 July - William Dunlop, motorcycle racer (killed in crash 2018)
- 27 August - Hannah Peel, composer
- 2 September - Marissa Callaghan, footballer
- 3 October - Kevin Seaward, marathon runner
- 14 October
  - Emmet Friars, footballer
  - Alanna Nihell, boxer
- 2 November - John Lowry-Corry, Viscount Corry
- 18 November - Jonny Harkness, footballer

== See also ==
- 1985 in England
- 1985 in Scotland
- 1985 in Wales
