= 1957 in Northern Ireland =

- Centuries: 20th; 21st
- Decades: 1930s; 1940s; 1950s; 1960s; 1970s
- See also: 1957 in the United Kingdom; 1957 in Ireland; Other events of 1957; List of years in Northern Ireland

Events during the year 1957 in Northern Ireland.

== Incumbents ==
- Governor - The Lord Wakehurst
- Prime Minister - Basil Brooke

== Events ==
- 1 January – Border Campaign: Seán South and Fergal O'Hanlon are killed in an Irish Republican Army attack on a Royal Ulster Constabulary barracks in Brookeborough, County Fermanagh. Following this, the Government of Ireland uses the Offences Against the State Act to intern most of the IRA's leadership.
- 12 January – Over 100 Irish republican suspects are arrested under the Civil Authorities (Special Powers) Act (Northern Ireland).
- 17 January – Aircraft carrier HMCS Bonaventure (CVL 22), laid down in 1943 at the Harland and Wolff Belfast shipyard as HMS Powerful, is commissioned into the Royal Canadian Navy.
- 30 September – Last day of operation of 97 miles (155 km) of railway in Northern Ireland (Great Northern Railway (Ireland) branches and the entire Sligo, Leitrim and Northern Counties Railway) following government instructions. Fermanagh loses all its lines.
- undated – Cyril Lord opens a new factory for the production of tufted carpets at Donaghadee, County Down.

== Arts and literature ==
- May – Joan Trimble's television opera Blind Raftery is broadcast by the BBC.
- Padraic Fiacc publishes Woe to the Boy.

== Sport ==
=== Football ===
- Irish League

Winners: Glenavon

- Irish Cup

Winners: Glenavon 2 - 0 Derry City

== Births ==
- 21 January – Terence Francis MacCarthy, genealogist, historian and writer.
- 3 March
  - Mairéad Farrell, volunteer of the Provisional Irish Republican Army (killed by SAS soldiers during Operation Flavius 1988).
  - Patricia Lewsley, Social Democratic and Labour Party politician, Northern Ireland Commissioner for Children and Young People.
- 19 March – Patrick Joseph Kelly, Commander of the Provisional IRA East Tyrone Brigade (killed by Special Air Service at Loughgall 1987).
- 27 April – Jim Wells, Democratic Unionist Party MLA.
- 9 May – Billy Hamilton, footballer.
- 11 May – Mike Nesbitt, Ulster Unionist Party MLA.
- 23 May – Jimmy McShane, dancer and singer in Baltimora (died 1995).
- 4 August – Henry Cluney, rock guitarist.
- 16 August – Roberta Blackman-Woods, academic and politician.
- 29 August – Antoine Mac Giolla Bhrighde, Provisional Irish Republican Army volunteer (killed in armed confrontation with British troops 1984).
- 13 September – Mal Donaghy, footballer.
- 16 September – David McCreery, footballer.
- 30 November – Daniel McCann, volunteer of the Provisional Irish Republican Army (killed by SAS soldiers during Operation Flavius 1988).

=== Full date unknown ===
- Séanna Walsh (Breathnach), volunteer of the Provisional Irish Republican Army.
- Roy Walker, footballer and football manager.
- 1956/7 – Brian Gillen, member of the Belfast Brigade of the Provisional Irish Republican Army.

== Deaths ==
- 29 April – Harry Midgley, Northern Ireland Labour Party member of the Parliament of Northern Ireland and alderman of Belfast (born 1893).
- 29 March – Joyce Cary, novelist and artist (born 1888).
- 1 August – Cathal O'Byrne, singer, poet and writer (born 1867).

== See also ==
- 1957 in Scotland
- 1957 in Wales
