= 1976 in Northern Ireland =

- Centuries: 20th; 21st
- Decades: 1950s; 1960s; 1970s; 1980s; 1990s
- See also: 1976 in the United Kingdom; 1976 in Ireland; Other events of 1976; List of years in Northern Ireland

Events during the year 1976 in Northern Ireland.

== Incumbents ==
- Secretary of State - Merlyn Rees (until 10 September), Roy Mason (from 10 September)

== Events ==
- 5 January - Kingsmill massacre: ten Protestant men killed in South Armagh, Northern Ireland, by members of the Provisional Irish Republican Army (IRA), using the cover name "South Armagh Republican Action Force".
- 1 March - Merlyn Rees ends Special Category Status for those sentenced for crimes relating to the civil violence in Northern Ireland.
- 4 March - The Northern Ireland Constitutional Convention is formally dissolved in Northern Ireland resulting in direct rule from London via the British parliament.
- 12 March - Lenny Murphy, leader of the Shankill Butchers, is arrested, but his gang continue to murder.
- 17 March - Hillcrest Bar bombing: 4 Catholics are killed and a further 50 injured in Hillcrest, Dungannon, County Tyrone, Northern Ireland when a car bomb by the Ulster Volunteer Force (UVF) goes off outside a crowded pub on Saint Patrick's Day. The attack is one of the many attributed to the Glenanne gang.
- 15 July - Four prisoners escape when bombs explode in the Special Criminal Court, Dublin.
- 21 July - Christopher Ewart-Biggs, UK ambassador, and a civil servant, Judith Cooke, are killed by a landmine at Sandyford, County Dublin.
- 10 August - Andersonstown incident: Three children Andrew, Joanne and John Maguire die when they are hit by a car whose driver, an IRA fugitive named Danny Lennon, is fatally shot by British troops. A witness, Betty Williams, is inspired to set up Women for Peace.
- 14 August - 10,000 Protestant and Catholic women demonstrate for peace in Northern Ireland.
- 14 August - A 12-year-old girl named Majella O'Hare is fatally shot by Pvt. Michael Williams.
- 14 September - Kieran Nugent is first IRA man to be admitted to the Maze Prison without Special Category Status. He becomes the first blanketman.
- November - The Provisional Irish Republican Army restructures on cellular lines.
- 10 December - Betty Williams and Mairead Corrigan win the Nobel Peace Prize.
- Ruth Patterson becomes the first woman to be ordained to the ministry of the Presbyterian Church in Ireland.

== Arts and literature ==
- 16 March - Downtown Radio, an adult contemporary music station, begins broadcasting from Newtownards to the Belfast area, the first Independent Local Radio in Northern Ireland.
- Ciaran Carson publishes his first book, the poetry collection The New Estate.

== Sport ==
=== Football ===
- Irish League

Winners: Crusaders

- Irish Cup

Winners: Carrick Rangers 2 - 1 Linfield

== Births ==
- 25 March - Francis Bellew, Gaelic footballer.
- 30 March - Mark McClelland, musician, formerly with Snow Patrol.
- 3 June - Paul Berry, former Democratic Unionist Party MLA.
- 12 June - Ian McCrea, Democratic Unionist Party MLA.
- 15 June - Gary Lightbody, musician with Snow Patrol.
- 18 August - Damaen Kelly, boxer.
- 25 October - Steve Jones, footballer.
- 29 October - Stephen Craigan, footballer.

== Deaths ==
- 4 May - Hugh Delargy, British Labour Party politician and MP (born 1908).
- 29 July - Knox Cunningham, barrister, businessman and Ulster Unionist politician (born 1909).
- 7 October - Michael O'Neill, nationalist politician and MP (born 1909).
- 4 December - W. F. McCoy, Ulster Unionist member of the Parliament of Northern Ireland (born 1886).

== See also ==
- 1976 in Scotland
- 1976 in Wales
