= 1981 in Northern Ireland =

- Centuries: 20th; 21st
- Decades: 1960s; 1970s; 1980s; 1990s; 2000s
- See also: 1981 in the United Kingdom; 1981 in Ireland; Other events of 1981; List of years in Northern Ireland

Events during the year 1981 in Northern Ireland.

== Incumbents ==
- Secretary of State - Humphrey Atkins (until 14 September), Jim Prior (from 14 September)

== Events ==
- 16 January - Northern Ireland civil rights campaigner and former Westminster MP, Bernadette McAliskey is shot and injured by Loyalist paramilitaries at her home in County Tyrone, Northern Ireland.
- 21 January - The first DMC DeLorean sports car is produced in Dunmurry.
- 6 February - Attacks on shipping in Lough Foyle (1981-1982): Liverpool-registered coal ship Nellie M is bombed and sunk by a Provisional Irish Republican Army unit using a hijacked pilot boat in Lough Foyle.
- 1 March - Bobby Sands begins the 1981 Irish hunger strike in the Maze Prison (Long Kesh) near Lisburn.
- 9 April - Bobby Sands is elected Member of Parliament (MP) for Fermanagh and South Tyrone in the Parliament of the United Kingdom.
- 5 May - Bobby Sands dies on the 66th day of his hunger strike in the Maze Prison.
- 12 May
  - Hunger striker Francis Hughes, previously the most wanted man in the North, dies on the 59th day of his hunger strike in the Maze Prison (joined hunger strike March 15).
  - A British Army sniper kills Irish National Liberation Army member Emmanuel McClarnon from the top of Divis Tower.
- 21 May - Raymond McCreesh and Patsy O'Hara both die on the 61st day of their hunger strike in the Maze Prison (joined hunger strike March 22).
- 2 June - Completion of St Anne's Cathedral, Belfast, after 82 years.
- 11 June - Hunger striker Kieran Doherty is elected TD for Cavan–Monaghan in Dáil Éireann in the 1981 Irish general election.
- 8 July - Hunger striker Joe McDonnell of the Provisional IRA dies (joined hunger strike May 9).
- 13 July - Hunger striker Martin Hurson dies (joined hunger strike May 29).
- 1 August - Hunger striker Kevin Lynch dies (joined hunger strike May 23).
- 2 August - Hunger striker Kieran Doherty, TD, dies on the 73rd day of his hunger strike (joined hunger strike May 22).
- 8 August - Hunger striker Thomas McElwee dies (joined hunger strike June 8).
- 20 August - Hunger striker Micky Devine dies (joined hunger strike June 22).
- 3 October - Hunger strike officially ends.
- 22 October – The case of Dudgeon v United Kingdom is decided by the European Court of Human Rights, which rules that the continued existence of laws in Northern Ireland criminalising consensual gay sex is in contravention of the European Convention on Human Rights.

== Sport ==
=== Football ===
- Irish League

Winners: Glentoran

- Irish Cup

Winners: Ballymena United 1 - 0 Glenavon

== Motorcycling ==
- Robert Dunlop enters his first professional race, where he was fully sponsored, at Aghadowey.

== Births ==
- 17 January - Warren Feeney, footballer.
- 20 January - Christine Bleakley, television presenter.
- 20 January - Nathan Connolly, musician with Snow Patrol.
- 16 March - Andrew Bree, Irish swimmer
- 27 March - Terry McFlynn, footballer.
- 31 March - Gerard McCarthy, actor.
- 23 April - Jenny McDonough, hockey player.
- 29 April - George McCartney, footballer.
- 17 July - Andy Maxwell, rugby player.
- 10 September - Alan Blayney, footballer.
- 31 October - Liam McKenna, singer (Six).

=== Full date unknown ===
- Lucy Caldwell, playwright and novelist.

== Deaths ==
- 21 January - Norman Stronge, Ulster Unionist Party politician and Speaker of the Northern Ireland House of Commons for 23 years (born 1894).
- 5 May - Bobby Sands MP, volunteer in the Provisional Irish Republican Army (born 1954; died in 1981 Irish hunger strike).
- 8 July - Joe McDonnell, volunteer in the Provisional Irish Republican Army (born 1951; died in 1981 Irish hunger strike).
- 2 August - Kieran Doherty TD, volunteer in the Provisional Irish Republican Army (born 1955; died in 1981 Irish hunger strike).

=== Full date unknown ===
- Muriel Brandt, artist (born 1909).
- Séamus Ó Néill, writer (born 1910).
- Jackie Vernon, footballer (born 1918).

== See also ==
- 1981 in Scotland
- 1981 in Wales
