= 1978 in Northern Ireland =

- Centuries: 20th; 21st
- Decades: 1950s; 1960s; 1970s; 1980s; 1990s
- See also: 1978 in the United Kingdom; 1978 in Ireland; Other events of 1978; List of years in Northern Ireland

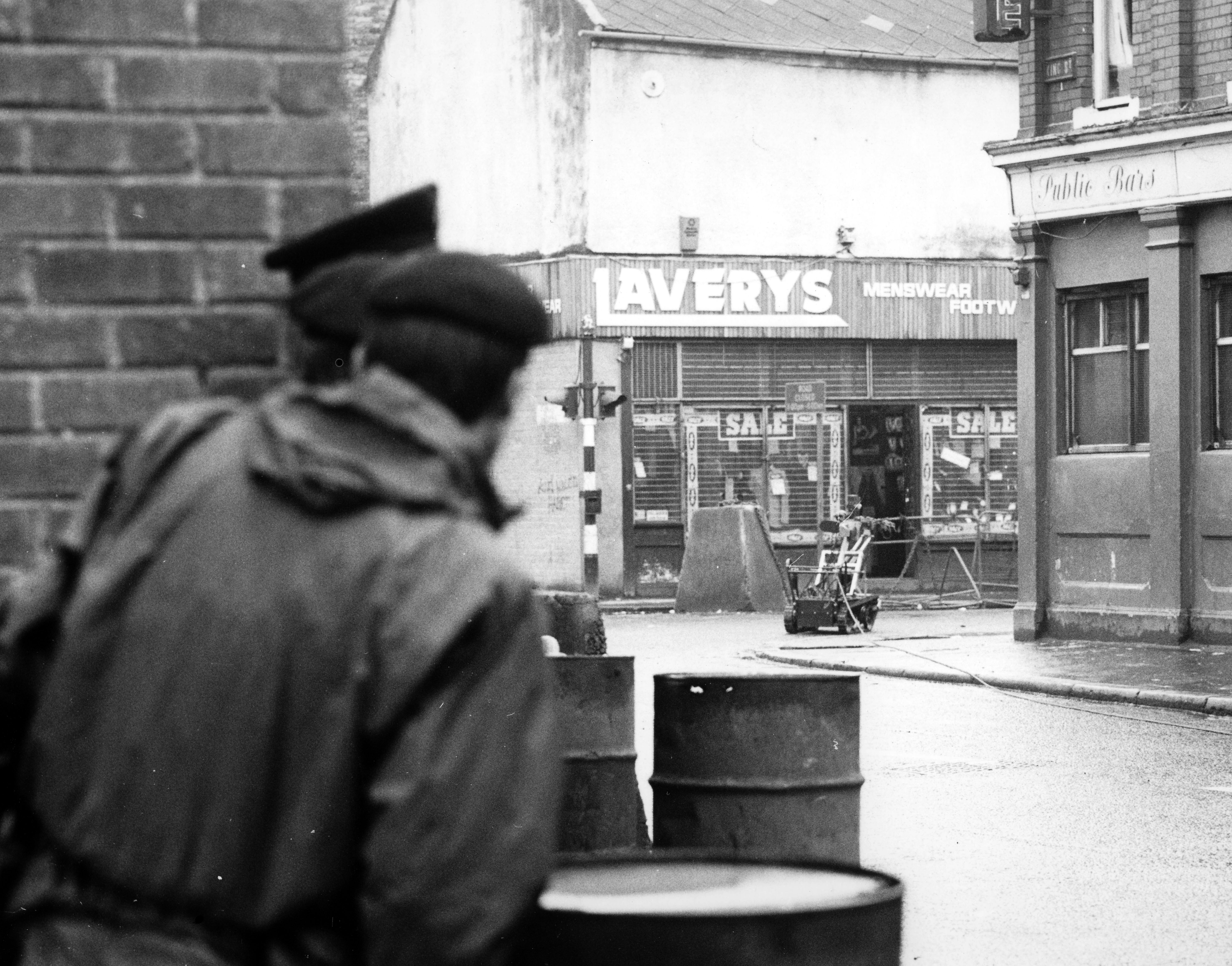
Wheelbarrow bomb disposal device being operated by a team from 321 EOD Coy Royal Army Ordnance Corps (RAOC) on the streets of Northern Ireland 1978.

Events during the year 1978 in Northern Ireland.

== Incumbents ==
- Secretary of State – Roy Mason

== Events ==
- 18 January – The European Court of Human Rights finds Britain guilty of inhuman and degrading treatment of republican internees in Northern Ireland, but not guilty of torture.
- 17 February – The IRA La Mon restaurant bombing kills 12 people.
- 1 June – David Cook of the Alliance Party becomes the first non-unionist Lord Mayor of Belfast.
- 21 June – An outbreak of shooting between Provisional IRA members and the British Army leaves one civilian and three IRA men dead.
- The Crown Liquor Saloon in Belfast is purchased by the National Trust.
- Belfast Zoo reopens following renovation by Belfast City Council.
- Belfast City Council begins a major renovation of Belfast Castle.

== Arts and literature ==
- May – Release of Rudi's punk rock single "Big Time", the first release for Terri Hooley's Good Vibrations (record label).
- September – Release of The Undertones' punk rock single Teenage Kicks, by Good Vibrations.

== Sport ==
=== Football ===
- Irish League

Winners: Linfield

- Irish Cup

Winners: Linfield 3 – 1 Ballymena United

== Births ==
- 1 January – Phillip Mulryne, footballer.
- 17 January – Warren Feeney, footballer.
- 21 January – Paul Leeman, footballer.
- 12 April – Graham Little, television presenter and journalist.
- 16 May – James McIntosh, food writer and chef.
- 23 July – Stuart Elliott, footballer.
- 26 August – Carolyn Jess-Cooke, writer and academic.
- 8 September – Colin Nixon, footballer.
- 23 October – Paul Morgan, footballer.
- 30 October – Liam Burns, footballer.
- 18 November – Damien Johnson, footballer.
- 6 December – Rigsy, radio and television presenter and DJ.

=== Full date unknown ===
- Andre Shoukri, member of the Ulster Defence Association.
- Clare Smyth, chef

== See also ==
- 1978 in Scotland
- 1978 in Wales
