= 1980 in Northern Ireland =

- Centuries: 20th; 21st
- Decades: 1960s; 1970s; 1980s; 1990s; 2000s
- See also: 1980 in the United Kingdom; 1980 in Ireland; Other events of 1980; List of years in Northern Ireland

Events during the year 1980 in Northern Ireland.

== Incumbents ==
- Secretary of State - Humphrey Atkins

== Events ==
- 1 January – First national anti-H-Block march.
- 27 October – Seven Provisional Irish Republican Army (IRA) prisoners go on hunger strike in Long Kesh.
- 8 December – Taoiseach Charles Haughey meets with the British Prime Minister Margaret Thatcher at Dublin Castle, the first visit by a British prime minister since independence.
- 15 December – Thirty more IRA prisoners join the hunger strike.
- 18 December – Hunger striker Sean McKenna critically ill. Belief that settlement is imminent brings an end to the hunger strike.
- Work begins on the building of the Foyle Bridge in Derry.
- W. A. McCutcheon's official survey The Industrial Archaeology of Northern Ireland is published.

== Arts and literature ==
- 23 September – Field Day Theatre Company presents its first production, the premiere of Brian Friel's Translations at the Guildhall, Derry.
- Crescent Arts Centre is founded in Belfast.
- Annual Enniskillen Drama Festival revived.
- Ron Hutchinson's The Irish Play is first performed, in London.
- Medbh McGuckian publishes the first collections of her poems in two pamphlets, Portrait of Joanna and Single Ladies: Sixteen Poems and wins an Eric Gregory Award.
- Bernard MacLaverty publishes his novel Lamb.

== Sport ==
=== Boxing ===
- Hugh Russell wins Flyweight Bronze medal at the 1980 Summer Olympics.

=== Football ===
- Irish League

Winners: Linfield

- Irish Cup

Winners: Linfield 2 – 0 Crusaders

=== Motorcycling ===
- Robert Dunlop makes first appearance at the Cookstown 100.

== Births ==
- 7 January – Zöe Salmon, Blue Peter presenter and former Miss Northern Ireland in 1999.
- 17 January – Gareth McLearnon, flautist.
- 11 February – Cormac McAnallen, Tyrone Gaelic footballer (died 2004).
- 3 April – Adrian McCoubrey, cricketer.
- 14 April – Grant McCann, footballer.
- 11 June – Pete Snodden, radio DJ.
- 3 July – Andrew White, cricketer.
- 9 July – Michael Ingham, footballer.
- 23 September – Malachi Cush, singer-songwriter.
- 6 October – Stephen Carson, footballer.

== Deaths ==
- 5 July – A. J. Potter, composer (born 1918).
- 22 November – Norah McGuinness, artist (born 1901).

=== Full date unknown ===
- Ronnie Bunting, Official IRA member and a founder member of the Irish National Liberation Army, assassinated.
- Sam Cree, playwright (born 1928).
- Jimmy McCambridge, footballer (born 1905).
- Johnny McKenna, footballer (born 1926).

== See also ==
- 1980 in Scotland
- 1980 in Wales
