= Templer House =

High-rise flats in Belfast

Templer House was the original name of a high-rise flat (apartment) building in the New Lodge neighbourhood of Belfast, Northern Ireland. Now called Maeve House, it was well known as a British Army observation post during The Troubles. The post included high-technology observation devices such as electronic monitoring equipment, cameras and night vision.

The location of the outpost provoked demonstrations against it by the Irish Republican community.

As with most high-rise flats in the area, Templer House was named in honour of a senior British Army officer, namely Field Marshal Gerald Templer.
