= 1973 in Northern Ireland =

- Centuries: 20th; 21st
- Decades: 1950s; 1960s; 1970s; 1980s; 1990s
- See also: 1973 in the United Kingdom; 1973 in Ireland; Other events of 1973; List of years in Northern Ireland

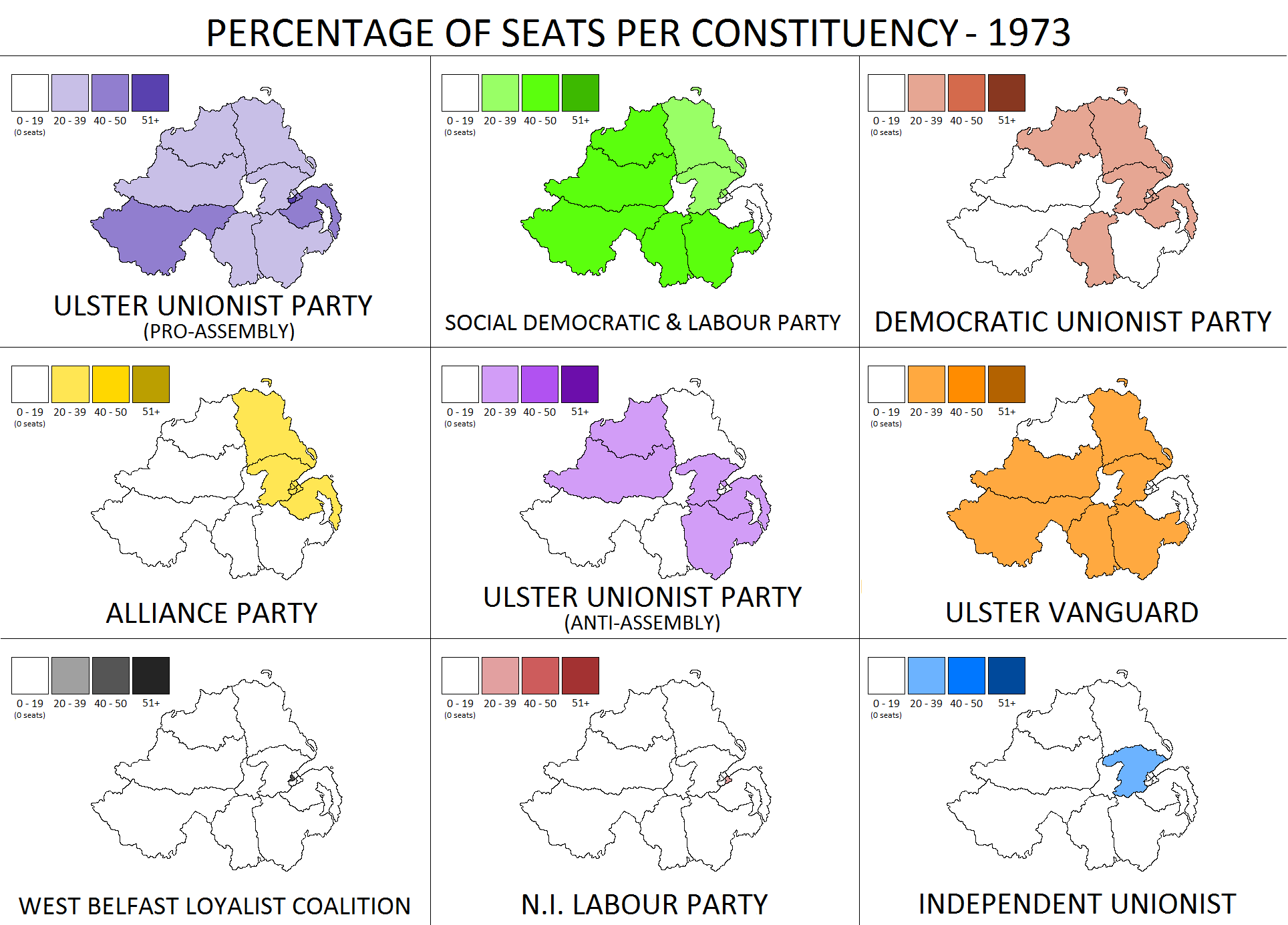

Events during the year 1973 in Northern Ireland.

== Incumbents ==
- Secretary of State - Francis Pym

== Events ==
- January - The Orange Standard newspaper is launched.
- 8 March – Northern Ireland sovereignty referendum (the "Border Poll"): 98.9% of those voting in the province want Northern Ireland to remain within the United Kingdom. Turnout is 58.7%, although less than 1% for Catholics.
- 20 March – A UK government White Paper on Northern Ireland, Northern Ireland Constitutional Proposals, proposes the re-establishment of an Assembly elected by proportional representation, with a possible All-Ireland council.
- 2 April – Special Powers Act 1922 is replaced by the Northern Ireland (Emergency Provisions) Act abolishing the death penalty for murder in Northern Ireland and establishing the Diplock courts.
- 28 June – Northern Ireland Assembly election.
- 18 July – The office of Governor of Northern Ireland, at this time held by The Lord Grey of Naunton, is abolished under Section 32 of the Northern Ireland Constitution Act. The Secretary of State for Northern Ireland, a UK cabinet office created in 1972, takes over the functions of the Governor on 20 December 1973 under Letters patent.
- 31 July – Militant protesters of Ian Paisley disrupt the first sitting of the Northern Ireland Assembly.
- 28 August (12:01 AM) – A Provisional Irish Republican Army bomb blows up the monument to the Rev. George Walker (died 1690) on Derry city walls.
- 1 November – James Flanagan, first and only Roman Catholic Chief Constable of the Royal Ulster Constabulary, replaces Graham Shillington.
- 9 December – The Sunningdale Agreement is signed by British Prime Minister Edward Heath, Taoiseach Liam Cosgrave, Brian Faulkner, Gerry Fitt and Oliver Napier.

== Sport ==
=== Football ===
- Irish League

Winners: Crusaders

- Irish Cup

Winners: Glentoran 3 – 2 Linfield

== Births ==
- 26 January – Brendan Rodgers, footballer and manager.
- 2 March – Peter Hutton, footballer.
- 17 March – David McCann, professional road bicycle racer.
- 16 July – Juliet Turner, singer.
- 20 August – Stephen Nolan, radio and television presenter.
- 12 November – Chris Walker, footballer.

=== Full date unknown ===
- Philip McGuigan, Sinn Féin councillor and former MLA.

== Deaths ==
- 19 January – Max Adrian, actor (born 1903).
- 8 April – E. R. Dodds, classical scholar (born 1893).
- 9 April – Warren Lewis, soldier and historian, brother of C. S. Lewis (born 1895).
- 21 May – Eugene O'Callaghan, Bishop of Clogher 1943–1969 (born 1888).
- 22 May – Harry Baird, footballer (born 1913).
- 18 August – Basil Brooke, 1st Viscount Brookeborough, Ulster Unionist Party MP, third Prime Minister of Northern Ireland (born 1888).
- 15 September – Tommy Herron, prominent member of the Ulster Defence Association.
- Paddy Wilson, SDLP politician (born 1933).

== See also ==
- 1973 in Scotland
- 1973 in Wales
