= 1987 in Northern Ireland =

- Centuries: 20th; 21st
- Decades: 1960s; 1970s; 1980s; 1990s; 2000s
- See also: 1987 in the United Kingdom; 1987 in Ireland; Other events of 1987; List of years in Northern Ireland

Events during the year 1987 in Northern Ireland.

== Incumbents ==
- Secretary of State - Tom King

== Events ==
- 8 May - Loughgall ambush: The British Army Special Air Service (SAS) kills 8 Provisional Irish Republican Army (IRA) members and a civilian in an ambush at Loughgall.
- 3 July - Richard Branson and Per Lindstrand become the first people to complete a transatlantic flight in a hot air balloon aboard the balloon Virgin Atlantic Flyer, first touching down in Northern Ireland.
- 8 November - Remembrance Day bombing: 11 civilians are killed in an IRA explosion during a Remembrance Day service in Enniskillen.
- 5 December - Downpatrick & Ardglass Railway begins public operation, the first Irish gauge heritage railway in Ireland.

== Arts and literature ==
- Ciarán Carson's The Irish for No poetry collection is published and wins the Alice Hunt Bartlett Award.

== Sport ==
=== Football ===
- Irish League

Winners: Linfield

- Irish Cup

Winners: Glentoran 1 - 0 Larne

- Warrenpoint Town F.C. formed.

=== Motorcycling ===
- Robert Dunlop wins the 125cc, 350cc and 1000cc races at the Cookstown 100 to be named “Man of the Meeting”.

== Births ==
- 2 January - Daryl Fordyce, footballer.
- 22 January - Eileen O'Higgins, actress.
- 21 February - Carl Frampton, boxer.
- 2 March - Jonathan Rea, motorcycle racer.
- 4 July - Jason Smyth, paralympian sprinter.
- 29 August - Tony Kane, footballer.
- 16 September - Kyle Lafferty, international soccer player.
- 17 September - Greg Thompson, cricketer.
- 6 October - Michael O'Connor, footballer.
- 25 October - Darron Gibson, footballer.

== Deaths ==
- 27 April - Maurice Gibson, judge (born 1913).
- 7 May - Colin Blakely, actor (born 1930).
- 8 May - Patrick Joseph Kelly, Commander of the Provisional IRA East Tyrone Brigade, killed by Special Air Service at Loughgall (born 1957).
- 22 June - John Hewitt, poet (born 1907).
- 3 December - George Seawright, Loyalist politician.
- 22 December - John McMichael, leading Ulster Defence Association member, killed in car bomb attack.

=== Full date unknown ===
- Alan Barnes, architect.
- Jimmy Warnock, boxer (born 1912).

== See also ==
- 1987 in England
- 1987 in Scotland
- 1987 in Wales
