= 1909 in Ireland =

- Centuries: 18th; 19th; 20th; 21st
- Decades: 1880s; 1890s; 1900s; 1910s; 1920s
- See also: 1909 in the United Kingdom; Other events of 1909; List of years in Ireland

Events in 1909 in Ireland.

== Events ==
- 31 October – The Royal University of Ireland was dissolved.
- 14 December – Ernest Shackleton delivered a lecture entitled Nearest the South Pole in the large hall of the National University in Dublin.
- 31 December – Harry Ferguson became the first person to fly an aircraft in Ireland, in a monoplane he designed and built himself.
- The Mater Infirmorum Hospital in Belfast was officially recognised as a university teaching hospital.
- Fieldwork for the multidisciplinary Clare Island Survey commenced under the direction of Robert Lloyd Praeger.

== Arts and literature ==
- 1 April – Lennox Robinson's first play, The Cross Roads, was performed at the Abbey Theatre in Dublin; he became the theatre manager later in the year.
- 22 July – Widowed Irish painter John Lavery married Irish American painter Hazel Martyn.
- 20 August – The tenor Enrico Caruso performed at the Theatre Royal in Dublin.
- 20 December – The first dedicated cinema in Ireland, the Volta Cinematograph, opened in Dublin under the management of writer James Joyce.
- Herbert Hughes' collection of folk songs, Irish Country Songs, was published, including "She Moved Through the Fair" with words largely composed by Padraic Colum.
- Ella Young's first work of Irish folklore, The Coming of Lugh, was published.

== Sport ==
=== Association football ===
- International
  - 13 February – England 4–0 Ireland (in Bradford)
  - 15 March – Scotland 5–0 Ireland (in Glasgow)
  - 20 March – Ireland 2–3 Wales (in Belfast)
- Irish League
  Winners: Linfield F.C.
- Irish Cup
  Winners: Cliftonville F.C. 0–0 draw; replay result 2-1 Bohemian F.C.

== Births ==
- 9 January – Patrick Peyton, priest who promoted the Rosary (died 1992).
- 16 January – Muriel Brandt, painter (died 1981 in Northern Ireland).
- 30 January – George Crothers, cricketer (died 1982 in Northern Ireland).
- 1 February – Timothy McAuliffe, Labour Party politician (died 1985).
- 8 March – Francis MacManus, novelist (died 1965).
- 3 April – Knox Cunningham, barrister, businessman and Ulster Unionist politician (died 1976).
- 19 April – Conel Hugh O'Donel Alexander, cryptanalyst, chess player and chess writer (died 1974).
- 24 April –
  - Robert Farren (Roibeárd Ó Faracháin), poet (died 1984).
  - David Beers Quinn, historian (died 2002).
- 30 April – F. E. McWilliam, sculptor (died 1992).
- 4 June – Robert Dudley Edwards, historian (died 1988).
- 7 July – Cecilia Thackaberry, Presentation Sisters nun, killed in Nigeria performing relief work (died 1969).
- 24 July – Geoffrey Bing, lawyer and Labour politician in UK (died 1977 in Northern Ireland).
- 31 July – Martin White, Kilkenny hurler (died 2011).
- 1 August – W. R. Rodgers, writer, broadcaster, teacher and Presbyterian minister (died 1969).
- 4 October – Paddy Moore, association football player (died 1951).
- 7 October – Michael O'Neill, nationalist politician and Member of Parliament (MP) (died 1976).
- 25 August – Gabriel Hayes, sculptor, designer of Irish coins (died 1978).
- 20 October – James Patrick Scully, awarded George Cross for valour in 1941 in Liverpool in rescuing people from a bomb damaged building (d. 1974).
- 28 October – Francis Bacon, painter (died 1992).
- 4 November – Sir Basil Goulding, 3rd Baronet, cricketer, squash player and art collector (died 1982).
- 29 November – James Auchmuty, historian (died 1981).
- 6 December – Daniel A. McGovern, U.S. Army Air Forces photographer, documented atomic bombings of Hiroshima and Nagasaki (died 2005).
  Full date unknown
  - Jack Stanley Gibson, surgeon and writer (died 2005).
  - W. R. Rodgers, poet and writer (died 1969 in Northern Ireland).

== Deaths ==
- 10 January – John Conness, United States Senator from California 1863–1869 (born 1821).
- 4 February – James Lynam Molloy, poet, songwriter, and composer (born 1837).
- 3 March – Bishop Richard Owens, Bishop of Clogher 1894–1909 (born 1840).
- 19 March – Charles Guilfoyle Doran, Clerk of Works at St Colman's Cathedral, Cobh (born 1835).
- 24 March – William Lundon, Irish Parliamentary Party MP (born 1839).
- 24 March – John Millington Synge, author and playwright (Hodgkin's disease).
- 4 April – Sir Theobald Burke, 13th Baronet (born 1833).
- 22 May – Sir Rowland Blennerhassett, 4th Baronet, Liberal Party MP (born 1839).
- 3 June – Charlotte Grace O'Brien, political and social activist, writer, and plant collector (born 1845).
- 15 July – George Tyrrell, expelled Jesuit priest and Modernist Catholic scholar (born 1861).
- 1 December – William Joseph Corbet, nationalist politician and MP (born 1824).

== See also ==
- 1909 in Scotland
- 1909 in Wales
