= Billy Reid (Irish republican) =

Irish militant (1939–1971)

- Born: William Reid; 1 January 1939; New Lodge, Belfast, Northern Ireland
- Died: 15 May 1971 (aged 32); Academy Street, Belfast, Northern Ireland
- Military career
- Allegiance: Provisional Irish Republican Army
- Branch: 3rd Battalion of the Belfast Brigade
- Known for: Killed the first British soldier during The Troubles

William Reid (1 January 1939 – 15 May 1971) was a member of the Belfast Brigade of the Provisional Irish Republican Army. Reid killed the first soldier of the British Army in the Troubles and was later himself killed as he attempted another ambush of British Army personnel.

== Background ==
Reid was from Sheridan Street in the upper New Lodge area of North Belfast. He grew up in nearby Regent Street, Carrick Hill. He attended Catholic schools in North Belfast and became a joiner by trade. Reid boxed at amateur level for the local Holy Family Club.

== Shooting of Gunner Curtis ==
Reid is reported to have shot dead Gunner Robert Curtis of the British Army in the New Lodge, Belfast on 6 February 1971; Curtis was the first on-duty British soldier to be killed in Ireland since the Anglo-Irish War of the 1920s.

The day after the shooting of Curtis, the unionist Prime Minister of Northern Ireland, Major James Chichester-Clark stated that "Northern Ireland was at war with the Irish Republican Army Provisionals". The following week, following clashes at an the funeral of IRA volunteer James Saunders in North Belfast, the government of Northern Ireland, which at that time still controlled the security forces, banned the wearing of military-style uniforms by "subversive organisations".

== Death ==
On 15 May 1971, a foot patrol of the British Army was ambushed in Academy Street in the centre of Belfast by the Third Battalion Belfast Brigade. Billy Reid, aged 32, was engaged with the foot patrol when a comrade was wounded. Billy Reid told his two comrades to run and he would hold off the patrol. His gun jammed and he tried to escape. He was shot in the back.

== Memorial ==
Reid is the subject of a song called "The Ballad of Billy Reid", written by Brian Lyons, which tells the story of his death; the song has been recorded by a number of bands including Shebeen, Terry O'Neill, Spirit of 67, The ShamRogues and the Wolfe Tones. The song was included in the songbook Songs of Resistance 1968-1982.

A mural depicting Reid and other Irish republicans Sean McIlvenna, Rosemary Bleakley and Michael Kane is painted on the New Lodge Road in Belfast. A republican flute band from Glasgow, Scotland named itself the "Volunteer Billy Reid Republican Flute Band" in memory of Reid.
