= 1972 in Northern Ireland =

- Centuries: 20th; 21st
- Decades: 1950s; 1960s; 1970s; 1980s; 1990s
- See also: 1972 in the United Kingdom; 1972 in Ireland; Other events of 1972; List of years in Northern Ireland

Events during the year 1972 in Northern Ireland.

== Incumbents ==
- Governor – The Lord Grey of Naunton
- Prime Minister – Brian Faulkner (until 30 March)
- Secretary of State – William Whitelaw (from 24 March)

== Events ==
- 17 January – The "West Belfast Seven" Provisional Irish Republican Army (IRA) internees escape from prison ship Maidstone moored in Belfast Lough by swimming ashore.
- 30 January – Bloody Sunday: Thirteen unarmed civilians are shot dead in Derry as British paratroopers open fire on a banned civil rights march. A fourteenth, John Johnston, is also to die some months later after having been shot by a paratrooper.
- 9 February – A day of disruption takes place in Northern Ireland as people take to the streets in protest.
- 12 February – William Craig launches the Ulster Vanguard movement in Lisburn.
- 22 February – 1972 Aldershot Bombing: The Official Irish Republican Army detonates a bomb outside the headquarters of the British Army's 16th Parachute Brigade in Aldershot, England, killing 7 and injuring 17.
- 22 March – Bomb explodes near Europa Hotel, Belfast.
- 30 March – The Parliament of Northern Ireland suspended after the Unionist government refuses to cede security powers to UK government and Northern Ireland Prime Minister Brian Faulkner resigns. Direct rule from the UK is introduced.
- 1 April – William Whitelaw is appointed as the first Secretary of State for Northern Ireland.
- 19 April – A report by the Lord Chief Justice, Lord Widgery, into the Bloody Sunday shootings exonerates the British troops of blame because the demonstration had been illegal. This report will be completely discredited by the Saville Inquiry published on 15 June 2010, on which day the British prime minister David Cameron will acknowledge in the House of Commons, among other things, that the paratroopers had fired the first shot, had fired on fleeing unarmed civilians, and shot and killed one man who was already wounded; he will then apologise on behalf of the British Government.
- 30 May – The Official Irish Republican Army declares a ceasefire in Northern Ireland.
- 3 June – A Protestant demonstration in Derry against the creation of "no-go" areas in the city ends in violence.
- 13–14 June – The Provisional Irish Republican Army proposes a ceasefire. The Social Democratic and Labour Party (SDLP), as intermediaries, make offer to British, who accept terms.
- 24 June - Dungiven landmine and gun attack Three British soldiers were killed and two injured when their mobile patrol struck a Provisional IRA landmine near Dungiven. Two other soldiers were injured when IRA snipers opened fire on the patrol after the blast.
- 9 July – End of British–IRA ceasefire. Start of Battle of Lenadoon which lasts until 14 July, with a total of 28 people, civilians, soldiers & paramilitaries all being killed. The Springhill massacre in which British Army snipers killed five unarmed civilians & injured two others occurred during this period on 9 July just a few hours after the ceasefire broke down.
- 18 July – Killing of Thomas Mills in Belfast. The British Army originally claimed the IRA was responsible for Mills' death. It would not be until 2019 when the Historical Enquiries Team discloses he was killed by a member of the King's Regiment.
- 19 July – A five-month-old boy, Alan Jack, is killed when an IRA car bomb explodes on Canal Street in Strabane. He is the youngest victim of the Troubles up to this point.
- 21 July – Bloody Friday: Nine people die and over one hundred are injured in a series of Provisional IRA explosions in Belfast city centre.
- 31 July
  - Operation Motorman, 4:00 AM: British Army begins to regain control of the "no-go areas" established by Irish republican paramilitaries in Belfast, Derry ("Free Derry") and Newry.
  - Claudy bombing ("Bloody Monday"), 10:00 AM: Three car bombs in Claudy, County Londonderry, kill six immediately with three dying later in hospital. It becomes public knowledge only in 2010 that a local Catholic priest was an IRA officer believed to be involved in the bombings but his role was covered up by the authorities.
- July – Shankill Butchers begin killing Catholics.
- 10 September – Three British soldiers are killed and four injured when the IRA blows up their Saracen armoured personnel carrier at Sanaghanroe near Dungannon.
- 25 September – Darlington conference on the future of Northern Ireland opens.
- 23 October – Pitchfork murders, a civil rights activist Michael Naan and a laborer Andrew James Murray are killed after being stabbed to death by two British soldiers.
- 7 December – Murder of Jean McConville: Provisional Irish Republican Army volunteers, including women, take a recently widowed mother of 10, who they claim to be an informer, in Belfast at gunpoint. She is shot in the head and buried secretly across the Irish border. There is no police investigation of the crime until 1995.
- 20 December - In a Catholic enclave in the majority Protestant Waterside area of Derry City the UDA shot dead five civilians in a pub, killing four Catholics & one Protestant and injuring several others in what became known as Annie's Bar Massacre. See: Top of the Hill bar shooting for more information.
- 28 December – In Belturbet, Co. Cavan, Geraldine O'Reilly, 15, from Cavan, and Patrick Stanley, 16, from Offaly are murdered by an unclaimed bomb.
- 1972 is the worst year for casualties in The Troubles, with 479 people killed (including 130 British soldiers) and 4,876 injured.

== Arts and literature ==
- The Planning (Northern Ireland) Order first provides for listed buildings in Northern Ireland.
- Seamus Deane's poetry Gradual Wars is published.

== Sport ==
=== Athletics ===
- Olympics (Munich)

Pentathlon: Mary Peters becomes the first Irish woman to win a gold medal at the Olympic Games.

=== Football ===
- Irish League

Winners: Glentoran

- Irish Cup

Winners: Coleraine 2 – 1 Portadown

- On 13 October 1972 Derry City withdraws from senior football in the Irish League due to security problems in the Brandywell Stadium area.

=== Motorcycling ===
- Ulster Grand Prix cancelled due to the political situation.

=== Snooker ===
- Alex Higgins wins the World Professional Snooker Championship.

== Births ==
- 15 January – Derek Heasley, cricketer.
- 24 January – Éamonn Burns, Gaelic footballer.
- 12 February – Owen Nolan, ice hockey player.
- 6 March – Terry Murphy, snooker player.
- 24 April – Sinéad Morrissey, poet.
- 27 May – Maggie O'Farrell, novelist.
- 21 June – Neil Doak, cricketer and rugby player.
- 9 July – Darren Corbett, boxer.
- 6 September – Gary Arbuthnot, flautist.
- 1 November
  - Kevin Horlock, soccer player.
  - Gillian Sewell, field hockey player in Canada.
- 24 November – Iain Jenkins, soccer player.
- 28 November – Bronagh Gallagher, actress and singer.

== Deaths ==
- 22 February – Eva McGown, Official Hostess of Fairbanks and Honorary Hostess of Alaska (born 1883).
- 15 April – Joe McCann, Official Irish Republican Army volunteer killed by British soldiers (born 1947).

== See also ==
- 1972 in Scotland
- 1972 in Wales
