= 1974 in Northern Ireland =

- Centuries: 20th; 21st
- Decades: 1950s; 1960s; 1970s; 1980s; 1990s
- See also: 1974 in the United Kingdom; 1974 in Ireland; Other events of 1974; List of years in Northern Ireland

Events during the year 1974 in Northern Ireland.

== Incumbents ==
- Secretary of State - Francis Pym (until 5 March), Merlyn Rees (from 5 March)

== Events ==
- 2 January – First day in office of the Northern Ireland Executive.
- 15 February – A 600 lb bomb explodes in Dungannon.
- 28 February – United Kingdom general election. The Ulster Unionist Party tops the local polls with seven seats, with the Vanguard Unionist Progressive Party winning three and one each for the Democratic Unionist Party and the Social Democratic and Labour Party.
- 5 March – Merlyn Rees becomes Secretary of State for Northern Ireland.
- 30 March – Major incendiary bomb attack on Bangor town centre.
- 2 May – The Ulster Volunteer Force launch a bomb attack on the Rose & Crown bar on the Ormeau Road in Belfast. Five people die in the explosion with a sixth subsequently succumbing to his injuries.
- 14 May – Northern Ireland grinds to a halt as the Ulster Workers' Council calls a strike following the defeat of an anti-Sunningdale Agreement motion.
- 17 May – Dublin and Monaghan bombings: Thirty-three civilians are killed and almost 300 wounded in four car bomb explosions in Dublin and Monaghan in the Republic of Ireland by the Ulster Volunteer Force, the highest number of casualties in any one day during The Troubles. The UVF is widely suspected of receiving technical assistance from British security forces.
- 21 May – The Ulster Workers' Council Strike comes to an end.
- 28 May – The five-month-old Northern Ireland Executive collapses.
- 15 June – A mentally disabled man named John Pat Cunningham is shot and killed in controversial circumstances by the Life Guards regiment in Benburb.
- 10 October – The second United Kingdom general election of the year. The same members are returned for all seats except Fermanagh and South Tyrone where the Ulster Unionists lose out to Independent Republican candidate Frank Maguire.
- 15 October – Republican prisoners attack guards and set fire to huts in HM Prison Maze.
- 16 October – Republican women prisoners in Armagh prison hold governor and three guards hostage.
- 28 October – A 300 lb Provisional Irish Republican Army (IRA) van bomb kills two British Army soldiers at Ballykinler and injures 33 others.
- 7 November – An IRA bomb explodes at the Kings Arms, Woolwich in London.
- 27 November – The Prevention of Terrorism Act is passed in the United Kingdom.
- 8 December – Irish Republican Socialist Party and its paramilitary wing the Irish National Liberation Army are formed.
- 15 December – Price sisters transferred to an English jail (following hunger strike which had ended in June).
- 18 December – Government announces compensation payments for relatives of Bloody Sunday victims, according to the Ministry of Defence "in a spirit of goodwill and conciliation".
- 22 December – Second cease-fire between IRA and British (lasts until about April 1975).

=== Full date unknown ===
- Junior Orange Institution is formed; a branch of the Orange Order which only accepts boys under the age of 16.
- Samson crane is completed at Harland and Wolff shipyard.

== Sport ==
=== Football ===
- Irish League

Winners: Coleraine

- Irish Cup

Winners: Ards 2 – 1 Ballymena United

== Births ==
- 18 January – Steve Lomas, footballer
- 7 February – Jonny Bell, rugby player
- 23 February – Neil Sinclair, boxer
- 28 April – Jeremy Davidson, rugby player
- 4 May – Tony McCoy, jockey
- 11 May – Peter Gillespie, cricketer
- 5 June – Claire McCollum, television presenter and journalist
- 6 November – Sean Hargan, footballer
- 28 November – Gary Neely, cricketer
- 17 December – Ryan Eagleson, cricketer

=== Full date unknown ===
- Dan Donnelly, singer-songwriter
- Leontia Flynn, poet
- Darragh Morgan, musician

== Deaths ==
- 9 March – Daniel O'Neill, artist (born 1920)
- 5 July – James Young, comedian (born 1918)

== See also ==
- 1974 in Scotland
- 1974 in Wales
