= 1970 in Northern Ireland =

- Centuries: 20th; 21st
- Decades: 1950s; 1960s; 1970s; 1980s; 1990s
- See also: 1970 in the United Kingdom; 1970 in Ireland; Other events of 1970; List of years in Northern Ireland

Events during the year 1970 in Northern Ireland.

== Incumbents ==
- Governor - The Lord Grey of Naunton
- Prime Minister - James Chichester-Clark

== Events ==
- 1 January – Ulster Defence Regiment is established as a volunteer British Army regiment to replace the Ulster Special Constabulary (B-Specials), which is disbanded during April/May.
- 11 January – Sinn Féin splits into Provisional and Official wings over a disagreement on abstentionism.
- 31 March – Northern Ireland Railways runs the last regular steam-hauled passenger train on a national network in the British Isles, 17.25 Whitehead, County Antrim–Carrickfergus, hauled by Class WT 2-6-4 tank locomotive No. 4.
- 3 April – Garda Richard Fallon (Republic of Ireland policeman) murdered on duty in Dublin. First policeman killed in the South during the troubles.
- 16 April – Rev. Dr. Ian Paisley enters the Parliament of Northern Ireland after winning the Bannside by-election.
- 21 April – The Alliance Party is founded in Northern Ireland.
- 6 May – Arms Crisis in the Republic of Ireland: The Minister for Finance, Charles Haughey, and the Minister for Agriculture, Neil Blaney, are asked to resign by Taoiseach Jack Lynch. He accuses them of the attempted illegal importation of arms for use by the Provisional IRA. Kevin Boland, the Minister for Local Government, resigns in sympathy with them.
- 27 May – Captain James Kelly, Albert Luykx and John Kelly are arrested. They are charged with conspiracy to import arms.
- 28 May – Charles Haughey and Neil Blaney appear in Dublin's Bridewell Court charged, along with Albert Luykx and Capt. Kelly, with conspiracy to import arms.
- 19 June – United Kingdom General election.
- 26 June - Four people were killed, and one mortally wounded (died 8 July 1970), by a fire at a house in the Creggan estate, Derry. Three of those killed were members of the Irish Republican Army (IRA). It is believed that they were preparing incendiary devices (probably petrol bombs), in the house of one of the IRA members, when a premature explosion in the kitchen caused an intense fire. Two young girls, aged 9 years and 4 years, the daughters of one of the IRA members, were found by fire officers in a bedroom of the house and died soon after in hospital. The girls were the first females to die in 'the Troubles'.
- 26 June – Riots break out in Derry over the arrest of Mid-Ulster MP Bernadette Devlin.
- 2 July – Neil Blaney is cleared of arms conspiracy charges.
- 3 July-5 July – Falls Road Curfew imposed by the British Army in Belfast.
- 5 July – After a special cabinet meeting the government demands a ban on all parades in Northern Ireland and the disarmament of civilians.
- 2 August – The British Army first fires rubber bullets in Belfast.
- 21 August – A new political party, the Social Democratic and Labour Party, is founded in Northern Ireland under the leadership of Gerry Fitt.
- 1 September – The New University of Ulster is presented with a Royal Charter by Elizabeth II.
- 23 October – Charles Haughey, James Kelly, Albert Luykx and John Kelly are acquitted in the Arms Conspiracy Trial.
- 26 October – Taoiseach Jack Lynch, questioned on his return from the United States, says that there will be no change in fundamental Fianna Fáil policy regarding Northern Ireland.

== Arts and literature ==
- 21 March – Dana wins the Eurovision Song Contest for Ireland with the song "All Kinds of Everything".
- Joan Lingard publishes The Twelfth Day of July, the first of her five Kevin and Sadie young adult novels set in Belfast during The Troubles.

== Sport ==
=== Football ===
- Irish League

Winners: Glentoran

- Irish Cup

Winners: Linfield 2 - 1 Ballymena United

=== Golf ===
- The Amateur Championship is held at Royal County Down Golf Club, (winner:Michael Bonallack.

== Births ==
- 16 January – Garth Ennis, comic writer.
- 1 April – Stephen McKeag, loyalist paramilitary.
- 2 April – Mark Glendinning, footballer.
- 20 April – Francis Campbell, academic and diplomat, British Ambassador to the Holy See
- 5 June – Eamonn Loughran, boxer.
- 2 July – Steve Morrow, footballer.
- 3 July – Arlene Foster, Democratic Unionist Party MLA.
- 6 July – Shauna Lowry, television presenter.
- 7 July – Wayne McCullough, boxer.
- 18 October – Gerry Taggart, footballer and football coach.
- c. 1 November – Fyfe Ewing, drummer.
- 7 November – Neil Hannon, chamber pop musician (The Divine Comedy).
- 10 November – Thomas Begley, Provisional Irish Republican Army member killed planting a bomb (died 1993).

=== Full date unknown ===
- Colette Bryce, poet.
- Geraldine Hughes, actress.

== Deaths ==
- 11 July – Bobby Kirk, ice hockey player (born 1910).
- 14 August – Tommy Henderson, Ulster independent Unionist politician (born 1887).

== See also ==
- 1970 in Scotland
- 1970 in Wales
