= 1979 in Northern Ireland =

- Centuries: 20th; 21st
- Decades: 1950s; 1960s; 1970s; 1980s; 1990s
- See also: 1979 in the United Kingdom; 1979 in Ireland; Other events of 1979; List of years in Northern Ireland

Events during the year 1979 in Northern Ireland.

== Incumbents ==
- Secretary of State – Roy Mason (until 5 May), Humphrey Atkins (from 5 May)

== Events ==
=== January to March ===
- 5 January – Two members of the Provisional Irish Republican Army (IRA) are killed in Ardoyne, Belfast, when the car bomb they are transporting explodes prematurely.
- 4 February – A former prison officer and his wife are shot dead at their home in Oldpark Road, Belfast, by the IRA.
- 20 February – Eleven Loyalists, known as the Shankill Butchers, are sentenced to life imprisonment for 112 offences, including nineteen sectarian murders.
- 24 February – Two Catholic teenagers, mistaken in the dark for a British Army foot patrol, are killed by the IRA in a remote-controlled bomb explosion at Darkley, County Armagh.
- 16 March – The Bennett Report, investigating allegations of ill treatment of people held in interrogation centres in Northern Ireland, is published and Government undertakes to implement major recommendations.
- 22 March – The IRA kills Richard Sykes, British Ambassador to the Netherlands, and his Dutch valet, in a gun attack in The Hague, Netherlands.
- 22 March – The IRA carries out a series of attacks across Northern Ireland with 24 bomb explosions.
- 30 March – Airey Neave, Conservative Party Spokesman on Northern Ireland, is killed by an Irish National Liberation Army (INLA) booby-trap bomb attached to his car at the House of Commons, London.

=== April to June ===
- 5 April – Two British Army soldiers are shot dead by the IRA while standing outside Andersonstown joint Royal Ulster Constabulary (RUC) and British Army base in Belfast.
- 11 April – Two British Army soldiers die as the result of a gun attack carried out by the IRA in Ballymurphy, Belfast.
- 16 April – A prison officer is shot dead by the IRA as he leaves a church in Clogher, County Tyrone, where his sister had just been married.
- 17 April – Four RUC officers are killed when the IRA explodes a 1,000-pound van bomb at Bessbrook, County Armagh.
- 19 April – A female prison officer is shot dead and three colleagues are injured in an IRA gun and grenade attack outside Armagh women's prison.
- 19 April – A British Army school cadet officer is shot dead by an IRA sniper in Belfast.
- 7 June – European Parliament election, the first direct election to the European Parliament. The Democratic Unionist Party, Social Democratic and Labour Party and Official Ulster Unionist Party each gain an MEP.

=== July to September ===
- 14 July – In Crossmaglen, County Armagh, Gaelic Athletic Association supporters parade silently in protest against the British Army's commandeering of part of the local football pitch.
- 27 August – In the Warrenpoint ambush the IRA kill eighteen British soldiers in two bomb explosions.
- 11 September – BBC Radio Foyle begins broadcasting.
- 29 September – Pope John Paul II, in Drogheda at the start of a 3-day visit to Ireland, appeals for an end to violence in Northern Ireland. Plans for him to extend his visit to Northern Ireland have been abandoned.

== Sport ==
=== Football ===
- Irish League

Winners: Linfield

- Irish Cup

Winners: Cliftonville 3 – 2 Portadown

=== Motorcycling ===
- Robert Dunlop makes his road race debut at the Temple 100.

== Births ==
=== January to June ===
- 11 January – Michael Duff, footballer.
- 27 February – Neil Anderson, cricketer.
- 3 April – Neil Best, rugby player.
- 15 May – Sean Friars, footballer.
- 18 May – Richard McKinney, footballer.
- 25 May – Andy Kirk, footballer.
- 28 May – Michael Halliday, footballer.
- 19 June – John Duddy, boxer.
- 20 June – Stuart Robinson, radio DJ.
- 30 June – Darren Kelly, footballer.

=== July to December ===
- 30 July – Graeme McDowell, golfer.
- 3 August – Paul McCloskey, boxer.
- 5 August – Richard Graham, footballer.
- 5 August – David Healy, footballer.
- 8 November – Aaron Hughes, international footballer.
- 24 November – Aidan O'Kane, footballer.
- 5 December – Gareth McAuley, footballer.
- 31 December – Emma Little-Pengelly, Democratic Unionist Party MP.

== Deaths ==
- 4 June – James Hamilton, 4th Duke of Abercorn, soldier and politician (born 1904).
- 10 August – Joseph O'Doherty, Sinn Féin MP, Fianna Fáil TD and Seanad member (born 1891).
- 15 November – Patrick McGilligan, Cumann na nGaedheal/Fine Gael TD and Cabinet Minister (born 1889).
- 17 December – Harold Jackson, cricketer (born 1888).

=== Full date unknown ===
- Billy McCracken, footballer and football manager (born 1883).

== See also ==
- 1979 in Scotland
- 1979 in Wales
