= 1983 in Northern Ireland =

- Centuries: 20th; 21st
- Decades: 1960s; 1970s; 1980s; 1990s; 2000s
- See also: 1983 in the United Kingdom; 1983 in Ireland; Other events of 1983; List of years in Northern Ireland

Events during the year 1983 in Northern Ireland.

== Incumbents ==
- Secretary of State - Jim Prior

== Events ==
- 7 February - The airfield at Sydenham, Belfast, reopens to commercial flights as Belfast Harbour Airport.
- 23 May - The Bushmills Distillery in County Antrim celebrates its 375th anniversary.
- 30 May - The inaugural meeting of the New Ireland Forum takes place at Dublin Castle.
- 10 June - Gerry Adams of Sinn Féin is elected the new Member of Parliament for West Belfast.
- 25 September - Maze Prison escape: 38 prisoners, using guns, escape from HM Prison Maze in the largest prison escape in U.K. history; one guard dies of a heart attack and twenty others are injured. Nineteen of the prisoners are apprehended within three days.
- 21 November - Three elders are shot dead during a service in Darkley Pentecostal Church, County Armagh. The shooting is claimed by the Catholic Reaction Force.

== Arts and literature ==
- 15 May - Charabanc Theatre Company's first production, Lay Up Your Ends, written by Martin Lynch with Marie Jones and other members of the company, is premiered at The Arts Theatre, Belfast.
- 9 November - Christina Reid's first play, Tea In A China Cup, is premiered at the Lyric Theatre, Belfast.
- Bernard MacLaverty's novel Cal is published.

== Sport ==
=== Football ===
- Irish League

Winners: Linfield

- Irish Cup

Winners: Glentoran 1 - 1, 2 - 1 Linfield

- Pat Jennings becomes the first footballer to play in 1,000 Football League matches.

=== Motorcycling ===
- Robert Dunlop wins Newcomers 350cc Isle of Man TT race.

== Births ==
- 17 January - Christopher Stalford, MLA (died 2022)
- 2 February - Bridget McKeever, international hockey player.
- 9 May - Alan Campbell, sculler.
- 17 June - Connie Fisher, actress and singer.
- 5 December - Samantha Lewthwaite, Islamic terrorist.

== Deaths ==
- 20 April - Sarah Makem, traditional singer (born 1900).
- 4 July - John Bodkin Adams, general practitioner in Eastbourne cleared of murdering one of his patients (born 1899).
- 21 August - Francis Evans, British diplomat (born 1897).
- 21 September - F. S. L. Lyons, historian and academic (born 1923).
- 15 November - John Rea, hammered dulcimer player.
- 23 December - Colin Middleton, artist (born 1910).

== See also ==
- 1983 in England
- 1983 in Scotland
- 1983 in Wales
