= 1988 in Northern Ireland =

- Centuries: 20th; 21st
- Decades: 1960s; 1970s; 1980s; 1990s; 2000s
- See also: 1988 in the United Kingdom; 1988 in Ireland; Other events of 1988; List of years in Northern Ireland

Events during the year 1988 in Northern Ireland.

== Incumbents ==
- Secretary of State - Tom King

== Events ==
- 11 January - SDLP leader, John Hume and Gerry Adams of Sinn Féin, have a surprise meeting in Belfast.
- 6 March - Operation Flavius: A Special Air Service team of the British Army shoots dead a Provisional Irish Republican Army (IRA) Active Service Unit (Danny McCann, Seán Savage and Mairéad Farrell, unarmed at the time) in Gibraltar.
- 16 March - Milltown Cemetery attack: Three men are killed and 70 are wounded in a gun and grenade attack by loyalist paramilitary Michael Stone on mourners at Milltown Cemetery in Belfast during the funerals of the three IRA members killed in Gibraltar.
- 19 March - Corporals killings in Belfast: British Army corporals Woods and Howes are abducted, beaten and shot dead by Irish republicans after driving into the funeral cortege of IRA members killed in the Milltown Cemetery attack.
- 15 June - The IRA kills six British soldiers in a bomb attack in Lisburn.
- 20 August - Ballygawley bus bombing: Eight British soldiers are killed by an IRA bomb attack on their bus in Ballygawley, County Tyrone.
- 12 October - As Pope John Paul II addresses the European Parliament, Ian Paisley heckles and denounces him as the Antichrist.
- 19 October - Broadcasting ban against Sinn Féin and other paramilitary linked groups begins.
- 11 November - Belfast Castle is reopened to the public following major renovation by Belfast City Council.

== Arts and literature ==
- 3 October - Marie Jones' play Under Napoleon's Nose is premiered on a schools tour.
- Glenn Patterson's first novel, Burning Your Own, is published.

== Sport ==
=== Football ===
- Irish League

Winners: Glentoran

- Irish Cup

Winners: Glentoran 1 - 0 Glenavon

- FAI Cup

Winners: Dundalk 1 - 0 Derry City

=== Golf ===
- October 16 - In golf, Ireland (Eamonn Darcy, Ronan Rafferty, Des Smyth) wins the Dunhill Cup at St Andrew's.

=== Motorcycling ===
- Robert Dunlop wins the 125cc race at the Cookstown 100.

== Births ==
- 3 January – Jonny Evans, footballer
- 12 January – Chris Casement, footballer
- 4 July – Conor MacNeill, actor
- 23 September – Mark Gallagher, footballer
- 2 November – Lisa Bowman, netball player

== Deaths ==
- 2 February - Frederick Blaney, cricketer (born 1918).
- 6 March - Mairéad Farrell, volunteer of the Provisional Irish Republican Army, killed by SAS soldiers during Operation Flavius (born 1957).
- 6 March - Daniel McCann, volunteer of the Provisional Irish Republican Army, killed by SAS soldiers during Operation Flavius (born 1957).
- 6 March - Seán Savage, volunteer of the Provisional Irish Republican Army, killed by SAS soldiers during Operation Flavius (born 1965).
- 2 November - Stewart Parker, poet and playwright (born 1941).
- 22 December - Jack Bowden, cricketer and hockey player (born 1916).
- 24 December – Noel Willman, actor and theatre director (born 1941)

== See also ==
- 1988 in England
- 1988 in Scotland
- 1988 in Wales
