= 1986 in Northern Ireland =

- Centuries: 20th; 21st
- Decades: 1960s; 1970s; 1980s; 1990s; 2000s
- See also: 1986 in the United Kingdom; 1986 in Ireland; Other events of 1986; List of years in Northern Ireland

Events during the year 1986 in Northern Ireland.

== Incumbents ==
- Secretary of State – Tom King

== Events ==
- January – Belfast City Hospital tower-block is opened.
- 1 January – The Troubles: James McCandless (39) and Michael Williams (24), both Protestant members of the Royal Ulster Constabulary, are killed by a Provisional Irish Republican Army remote controlled bomb hidden in a litter bin and detonated when their foot patrol passes at Thomas Street, Armagh.
- 23 January – Fifteen Westminster by-elections take place in Unionist-held constituencies after their MPs resigned in protest against the Anglo-Irish Agreement. Fourteen of the protesting MPs are re-elected, while Jim Nicholson (UUP) loses his seat in Newry and Armagh to the nationalist Seamus Mallon (SDLP).
- 3 March – Unionists hold an extensive day of action against the Anglo-Irish Agreement.
- 31 March – Tom King, Secretary of State for Northern Ireland, announces his decision to ban the Apprentice Boys of Derry Easter Monday Parade, resulting in rioting in various parts of the country, police homes attacked with petrol bombs, and 11 Catholic homes petrol-bombed in Lisburn. In Portadown, about 400 Apprentice Boys attempt to parade, leading to clashes with police and soldiers and rioting; meanwhile, about 3,000 Loyalists, led by Ian Paisley, assemble in protest at Garvaghy Road, and police are attacked there also. Sporadic rioting continues for several days.
- 6 June – John Stalker is removed from the 'shoot to kill' inquiry.
- 23 June – Northern Ireland Assembly dissolved. Police baton-charge loyalist protestors outside Stormont.
- 29 June – St Peter's Cathedral, Belfast (Catholic) is elevated from serving as a Pro-Cathedral.
- 3 July – The RUC allows an Orange Church parade to pass through the Catholic Obins Street area of Portadown (the "Tunnel"), but prohibits the 12 and 13 July parades from doing so.
- 6 July – Rioting breaks out when police prevent George Seawright, a Loyalist politician, from passing through the "Tunnel" area.
- 11 July – The Portadown Orangemen accept a compromise offered by the RUC to march along the Garvaghy Road route, resulting in a weekend of violence, with casualties including 128 police injuries, 66 civilian injuries and 127 arrests. The riots continue in Belfast and Portadown for six consecutive nights.
- 22 August – John Stalker, the deputy chief constable of Greater Manchester police, is cleared of misconduct over allegations of associating with criminals.
- November – Giant's Causeway and the Causeway Coast is included in the first tranche of UNESCO World Heritage Sites designated in the UK

== Arts and literature ==
- Deirdre Madden publishes her first novel, Hidden Symptoms.
- Martin Waddell, writing as Catherine Sefton, publishes Starry Night, the first of a series of three young adult novels set in The Troubles.

== Sport ==
=== Football ===
- Football World Cup
  - Group stage
    - Northern Ireland 1-1 Algeria
    - Northern Ireland 1-2 Spain
    - Northern Ireland 0-3 Brazil
      - Northern Ireland are knocked out at the group stage of the World Cup
- Irish League
  - Winners: Linfield
- Irish Cup
  - Winners: Glentoran 4 - 1 Coleraine

=== Motorcycling ===
- Joey Dunlop wins the Formula One motorcycle world championship for the fifth time in a row.

== Births ==
- 1 January – Colin Morgan, actor.
- 5 February – Gary Wilson, cricketer.
- 22 February – Mark Allen, snooker player.

== Deaths ==
- 12 February – James Joseph Magennis, awarded Victoria Cross for taking part in Operation Struggle in 1945 (born 1919).
- 28 March – Eddie McAteer, Nationalist Party (Northern Ireland) MP (born 1914).
- 16 November – Siobhán McKenna, actress (born 1923).
- Undated – Eddie Duffy, traditional Irish musician (born 1894).

== See also ==
- 1986 in England
- 1986 in Scotland
- 1986 in Wales
