= 1975 in Northern Ireland =

- Centuries: 20th; 21st
- Decades: 1950s; 1960s; 1970s; 1980s; 1990s
- See also: 1975 in the United Kingdom; 1975 in Ireland; Other events of 1975; List of years in Northern Ireland

Events during the year 1975 in Northern Ireland.

== Incumbents ==
- Secretary of State - Merlyn Rees

== Events ==
- 10 February – A Provisional IRA (PIRA) ceasefire begins; this ceasefire officially lasts until 23 January 1976.
- 20 February – A violent feud erupts between the Official Irish Republican Army (OIRA) and the Irish Republican Socialist Party and Irish National Liberation Army (INLA).
- 1 May – Elections take place for the Northern Ireland Constitutional Convention.
- 5 June – United Kingdom European Communities membership referendum takes place across the United Kingdom, Northern Ireland votes to remain in the European Communities with a slight majority.
- 17 July – The South Armagh Brigade of the PIRA killed four soldiers at Forkhill, County Armagh with a remote-controlled improvised explosive (Forkhill beer keg bombing).
- 31 July – Miami Showband killings: Three members of The Miami Showband, together with two paramilitaries, are killed in an Ulster Volunteer Force (UVF) ambush in County Down as they return home to Dublin from playing at a dance in Banbridge.
- 13 August – Bayardo Bar Attack: The PIRA carried out a gun and bomb attack on the Bayardo Bar on the Shankill Road in Belfast, a bar frequented by UVF commanders. Four Protestant civilians and one UVF member were killed.
- 22 November – Drummuckavall ambush: The PIRA attacked a British Army observation post at Drummuckavall near Crossmaglen, County Armagh, killing three soldiers.
- 31 December – Central Bar bombing: The INLA carried out a bomb attack on a bar in Gilford, County Down, killing three Protestant civilians.

== Arts and literature ==
- 14 May – Patrick Galvin's We Do It For Love, a satire on The Troubles, opens at the Lyric Theatre.
- October – Stewart Parker's Spokesong opens at the Lyric (Belfast); his play I’m a Dreamer, Montreal is also written this year.
- The punk rock/new wave band which will become The Undertones is formed in Derry.
- William Peskett's poems The Nightowl's Dissection are published.

== Sport ==
=== Football ===
- Irish League – Winners: Linfield
- Irish Cup – Winners: Coleraine 1 – 1, 0 – 0, 1 – 0 Linfield
- 16 August – Ballinamallard United F.C. established

== Births ==
- 18 February – Keith Gillespie, international soccer player.
- 9 June – Brian Magee, boxer.
- 21 July – Cara Dillon, folk singer
- 24 July – Gordon Cooke, cricketer.
- 27 August – Kyle McCallan, cricketer.
- 4 September – Andrew Patterson, cricketer.
- 13 October – Oisín McConville, Armagh Gaelic footballer.
- 4 November – Warren Christie, actor.

=== Full date unknown ===
- Nick Laird, novelist and poet.

== Deaths ==
- 23 February – Ernest Blythe, writer, journalist and theatre manager, member of First Dáil and cabinet minister (born 1889).
- 28 April – Billy McMillen, OIRA officer, killed in feud with the INLA (born 1927).
- 25 November – Moyna Macgill, stage and film actress, mother of Angela Lansbury (born 1895).

== See also ==
- 1975 in Scotland
- 1975 in Wales
