= Cecilia Thackaberry =

Irish nun and missionary

Sister Cecilia Thackaberry, PBVM (née Sarah Agnes Thackaberry; 7 July 1909 – September 1969) was an Irish nun with the Presentation Sisters who was killed in Nigeria while performing relief work during the Nigerian Civil War.

Born in Dublin, she attended the Presentation Sisters school in Warrenmount and later studied with the Loreto Sisters in St Stephen's Green. In November 1933, she entered the Presentation Order in Buxton. In the intervening years up to 1965, she taught and acted as Novice Mistress in various locations throughout England, including Presentation Convent, Stapenhill, Burton-on-Trent, Staffordshire. In 1939, she was living and teaching in the Isle of Axholme, Lincolnshire.

In September 1965, Sister Cecilia led a group of two other sisters who embarked on the 26-day journey to Port Harcourt in Nigeria. The Presentations Sisters had been invited by the local Bishop to minister in his Diocese. On her arrival in Nigeria, the sisters took charge of the Sancta Marian nursery and primary schools. Sister Cecilia started evening classes for a girl who could not afford school fees. Nigeria began experiencing upheaval after gaining its independence from the UK in 1960. The eastern region became independent in 1967 under the name Republic of Biafra. Federal troops invaded Biafra that year and the Presentation community moved from Port Harcourt to Owerri.

Sister Cecilia helped in refugee camps aided by world agencies and in Umuahia she and another nun organised relief work and medical care for refugees facing famine who flocked to Owerri. A sick bay was established in Owerri, Nigeria. Gradually she was able to reach out to more and more people.

On the day of her death in September 1969, she and another nun were taking a nurse out to look after one of their newest sick bays. They had only travelled three miles when their vehicle was hit by fire from a low flying Nigerian aircraft. Sister Cecilia and the driver were killed in the attack. Bishop Okoye, who had invited the sisters to Port Harcourt said: "[S]he was our first martyr of charity..." Her remains were laid to rest on the grounds of the parish church at Emekuku, Nigeria.
