= Daniel A. McGovern =

American lieutnant colonel (1909–2005)

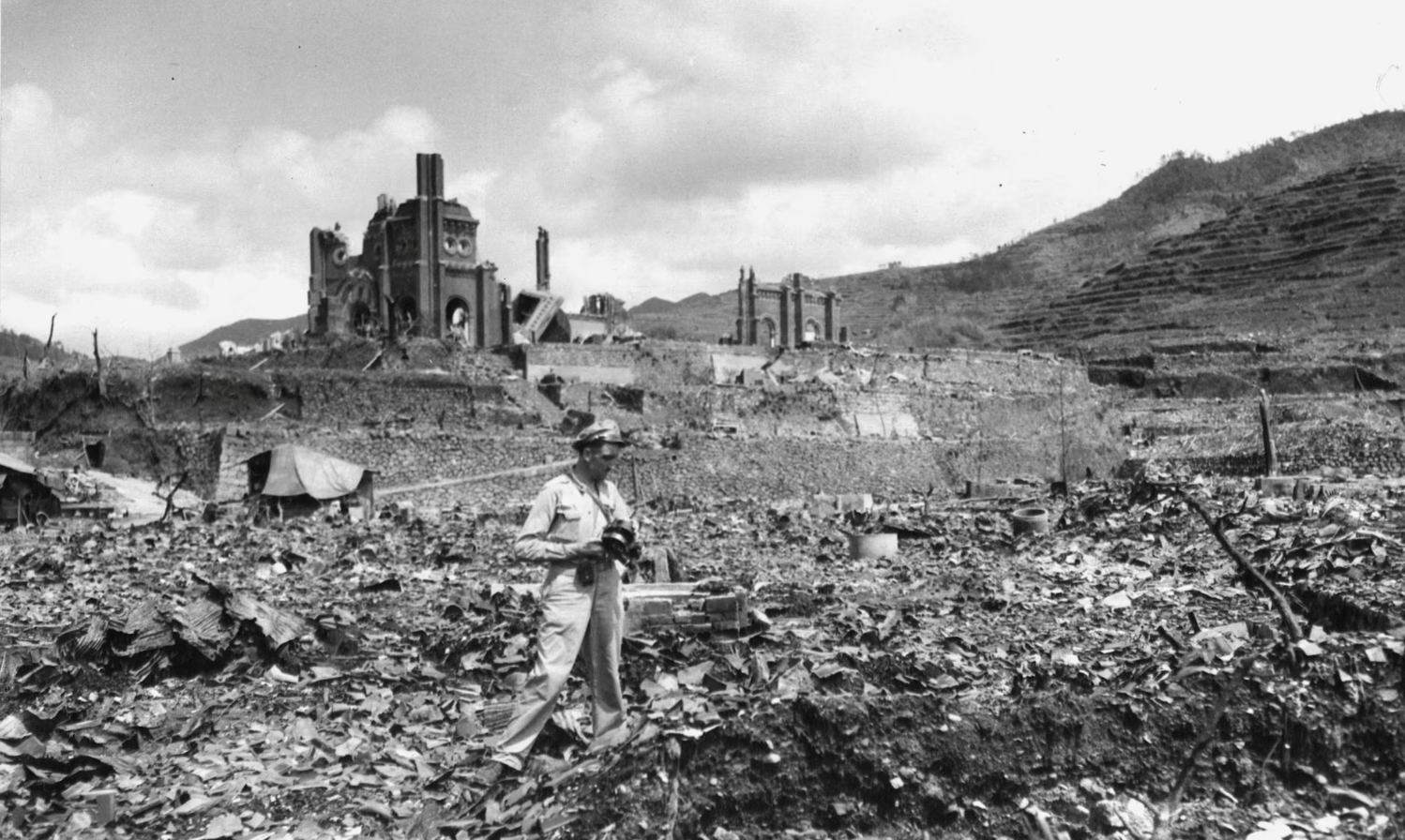
- Lt.Col Dan A. McGovern at Nagasaki ground zero on 9 September 1945
- Born: 6 December 1909; Monaghan, Ireland
- Died: 14 December 2005 (aged 96); Laguna Woods, California
- Burial place: Ascension Cemetery, Lake Forest, California
- Spouse: Virginia Scott
- Children: 4
- Military career
- Branch: Air Force
- Rank: Lieutenant colonel
- Known for: Filming aftermath of Hiroshima and Nagasaki bombings

Daniel A. McGovern (6 December 1909 – 14 December 2005) was the first American to film the aftermath of the atomic bombings of Hiroshima and Nagasaki. The United States Army Air Forces officer, who was both a combat cameraman and a specialist in assessing the effective of bomb damage, made the films in September 1945. The evidence that McGovern collected from Japan was shown to J. Robert Oppenheimer and the team which created the weapons. Concerned that the US government might censor the images, McGovern kept secret original prints. He made these prints available to US congress in 1967.

McGovern was personal photographer to US president Franklin D. Roosevelt.

== Early life ==
Daniel A. McGovern was born in Monaghan, Ireland on 6 December 1909. His father was a sergeant of the Royal Irish Constabulary. He grew up in Carrickmacross, where he saw the Irish War of Independence. McGovern would later recall "As the son of an RIC man, it was difficult for me to get along with the other young fellows. They would often abuse me, kick me and gang up on me. I had to defend myself". After the signing of the Anglo-Irish Treaty in 1921 and the Partition of Ireland, Monaghan (along with the Ulster counties of Cavan and Donegal) opted to join the Republic of Ireland. In 1922, 12-year-old McGovern left Ireland emigrated with his family to the United States.

== Military career ==
In 1934, McGovern enlisted in the US Army. Shortly after the United States entered World War Two, McGovern became cameraman-photographer for President Franklin Roosevelt. He organized the Army Air Forces combat camera training school in Hollywood, California. He flew as a photographer on B-17 bombing missions over Europe; his footage was incorporated into the 1944 hit documentary Memphis Belle: A Story of a Flying Fortress. He survived two plane crashes.

=== Atomic bombings ===
In September 1945 Lt. Col McGovern became the first American to start documenting the destruction caused by the atomic bombings of Hiroshima and Nagasaki. His classified work was shown to Oppenheimer and the Manhattan Project. Due to his concern that his films would be censored by the US government, McGovern made secret copies of his original films. These were presented to a US Congressional committee in 1967 when the original films could not be found. Joseph McCabe, McGovern's biographer, said "McGovern's story is better, in my opinion, than Oppenheimer's."

=== Post war ===
McGovern was assigned to Lookout Mountain Air Force Station, a secret underground photo lab and studio in Hollywood hills. He filmed atomic tests in Nevada and the Pacific. He became chief of the technical photographic facility at Holloman Air Force Base. He retired in 1961 with the rank of Lt. Colonel.

== Later life ==
McGovern founded the International Combat Cameramen Association to "give credit to those who put their life on the line to capture combat footage". In December 1996, he appeared on television episode dedicated to exposing the Alien Autopsy footage as a fake.

== Personal life ==
During World War Two, McGovern married Virginia Scott; the pair had four children and were married until her death in March 2005. McGovern died on 14 December 2005.

== Legacy ==
In 2021, McGovern's life was the subject of a book titled "Rebels to Reels: A Biography of Combat Cameraman Daniel A. McGovern USAF".
