= Jack Stanley Gibson =

Irish surgeon (1909–2005)

- Born: November 3, 1909
- Died: April 2, 2005 (aged 95); Naas General Hospital, Republic of Ireland
- Education: Royal College of Surgeons, Dublin
- Occupation: Surgeon
- Years active: 1933–1979
- Known for: Advocating the use of hypnosis as an alternative to anaesthetics
- Notable work: How to Stop Smoking (popular LP)

Jack Stanley Gibson (3 November 1909 – 2 April 2005) was an Irish surgeon remembered for having advocated the use of hypnosis as an alternative to anaesthetics, not only through his surgical practice, but also through popular phonograph records, books, and videotapes.

== Life and career ==
Gibson graduated from the Royal College of Surgeons, Dublin, in 1933. The following year, he was the youngest surgeon ever to become a Fellow of the college, at the age of 25. After locums in Aden, Nyasaland, and South Africa, he became Dean of Durban Medical School in 1939. During World War II, he served with the Emergency Medical Service in Britain, treating wounded soldiers.

After a brief return to private practice in South Africa, he spent the 1950s in Guernsey. In 1959 he briefly went to Hailie Selassie Hospital in Ethiopia as a surgeon, then back to Dublin to take an appointment at Dr Steeven's Hospital. In 1959 Gibson became County Surgeon for Kildare in the Republic of Ireland, working mainly at Naas Hospital until he retired in 1979. He then dedicated himself to treating psychosomatic illnesses, using deep relaxation techniques and expanding his Relaxology Series of self-help recordings, until he died 25 years later.

In 1965, Gibson began producing his self-hypnosis material in popular media. How to Stop Smoking was Ireland's best-selling LP of January 1971.

Gibson died in the Naas General Hospital on 2 April 2005, at the age of 95.

== Works ==
=== Recordings ===
- "How to Relax" (EP, 1969); How to Stop Smoking (LP, 1971); "How to Lose Weight" (LP, 1972); "How to Sleep Better" (LP, 1972); "Painless Childbirth" (LP, 1972); and 30 subsequent recordings between 1972 and 2002 covering topics such as accidents, acne, acting, adolescence, anorexia, arthritis, asthma, bed-wetting, binge-eating, blushing, business efficiency, dermatitis, drinking, fear, flying, migraine, nail-biting, pain, period pain, relaxation, perfectionism, snoring, stammering, studying, warts and many others.

=== Videotapes ===
- The Power of the Subconscious (in which he performs eye surgery under hypnosis)
- A Compilation of the Work of Dr. Jack Gibson (comprising 4 TV Documentaries over 40 years)

=== Books ===
- The Life and Times of an Irish Hypnotherapist (1989)
- Relax and Live - A Practical Guide (1992)
- Memoirs of an Irish Surgeon—An Enchanted Life (1999)

== Learn more by visiting ==
- Dr Jack Gibson: How Hypnotherapy Can Aid Weight Loss
- Dr Jack Gibson: How Hypnotherapy Can Reduce Your Anxiety
- Dr Jack Gibson: Self Hypnosis: Myth vs Fact
- Dr Jack Gibson: Self Hypnosis: Hypnotherapy To Quit Smoking
- Dr Jack Gibson: The Secrets Of Relaxation
