= Tom Mulligan =

Irish Gaelic footballer

Personal information
- Native name: Tomás Ó Maolagáin (Irish)
- Born: Dublin, Ireland

Sport
- Sport: Gaelic football
- Position: -
Clubs
- Years: Club
- Good Counsel; Ballinteer St Johns; Round Towers
Inter-county
- Years: County
- 2002–2003: Dublin
Inter-county titles
- Leinster titles: 1
- All Stars: 0

Tomás Mulligan (14 August 1977 – 27 August 2007) is a former Gaelic footballer who played at senior level for the Dublin county team. Mulligan played club football for Good Counsel, Ballinteer St Johns and Round towers. He also attended Drimnagh Castle primary and secondary schools, where he made the first of his Croke Park appearances.
