= 1984 in Northern Ireland =

- Centuries: 20th; 21st
- Decades: 1960s; 1970s; 1980s; 1990s; 2000s
- See also: 1984 in the United Kingdom; 1984 in Ireland; Other events of 1984; List of years in Northern Ireland

Events during the year 1984 in Northern Ireland.

== Incumbents ==
- Secretary of State - Jim Prior (until 11 September), Douglas Hurd (from 11 September)

== Events ==
- 14 March - Sinn Féin MP Gerry Adams is shot and wounded in Belfast.
- 2 May - The New Ireland Forum publishes its report presenting three possibilities for discussion: a unitary Irish state, a federal/confederal state and joint sovereignty.
- 18 June - European Parliament elections are held in Northern Ireland and the Republic of Ireland.
- 1 October - The University of Ulster is presented with a Royal Charter by Elizabeth II. It also absorbs Ulster Polytechnic (at Jordanstown) during the year.
- 17 October - Foyle Bridge in Derry is officially opened, with the longest span in Ireland.

== Arts and literature ==
- Graham Reid's play Remembrance is first produced (10 October) at the Lyric Theatre (Belfast), and his television play A Coming to Terms for Billy, last in the trilogy of "Billy plays", is shown in BBC1's Play for Today series, starring Kenneth Branagh.

== Sport ==
=== Football ===
- Irish League

Winners: Linfield

- Irish Cup

Winners: Ballymena United 4 - 1 Carrick Rangers

== Births ==
- 22 April - Phillip Magee, singer and The X Factor (British series 2) finalist
- 5 July - Boyd Rankin, cricketer.
- 19 July - Neil McCafferty, footballer.
- 6 September - William Porterfield, cricketer.
- 20 October - Andrew Trimble, international rugby player.
- 23 October - Ruaidhri Higgins, footballer.
- 14 December - Chris Brunt, footballer

== Deaths ==
- 3 March - Rinty Monaghan, world flyweight boxing champion (born 1920)
- 6 April - Jimmy Kennedy, songwriter (born (1902).
- June - Alec Mackie, soccer player (born 1903).
- 30 December - William Bedell Stanford, classical scholar and senator (born 1910)

== See also ==
- 1984 in England
- 1984 in Scotland
- 1984 in Wales
