= Jonny Harkness =

Northern Ireland footballer

Personal information
- Date of birth: 18 November 1985 (age 40)
- Place of birth: Antrim, Northern Ireland
- Position: Left back

Youth career
- ?–2004: Walsall

Senior career*
Years	Team	Apps	(Gls)
2004–2006	Walsall	2	(0)
2005	→ Cambridge United (loan)	7	(0)
2005	→ Halesowen Town (loan)	4	(0)
2006–2008	Kidderminster Harriers	63	(6)
2008–2010	Linfield		
2010–2011	Coleraine F.C.		
2011–	Donegal Celtic F.C.	6	(1)
- * Club domestic league appearances and goals

Jonathan Harkness (born 18 November 1985) is a Northern Irish footballer who plays as a left fullback for Donegal Celtic. Harkness is a former Northern Ireland youth international and he had spells with Walsall and Cambridge United.

Harkness played as a teenager for Linfield making his debut at 16, eventually returning to the club when he was 22 from Kidderminster Harriers in 2008. In July 2010 he signed a one-year deal for Coleraine, and made his debut on 7 August 2010. After his one-year contract expired he was then signed by Donegal Celtic and made his debut for them on 6 August 2011.
