= Barry Archer =

Irish cricketer (born 1977)

Personal information
- Born: 21 June 1977 (age 49); Dublin, Ireland
- Batting: Left-handed
- Bowling: Right-arm medium

Career statistics
Competition	First-class	List A
Matches	3	3
Runs scored	52	4
Batting average	8.66	1.33
100s/50s	0/0	0/0
Top score	27	4
Balls bowled	84	54
Wickets	2	2
Bowling average	14.00	25.00
5 wickets in innings	0	0
10 wickets in match	0	0
Best bowling	1/5	2/42
Catches/stumpings	3/0	0/0
- Source: CricketArchive, 25 March 2019

Barry John Archer (born 21 June 1977) is an Irish cricketer. He is a left-handed batsman and a right-arm medium pace bowler.

He made his debut for Ireland against Scotland in June 1999 and has gone on to play for them 22 times to date, though he has not been selected since the European Championship of July 2000. Three of his games for Ireland had first-class status and a further three had List A status.
