= Ste V Roc =

Irish musician (born 1977)

Ste-V-Roc (born Steve Rock, 1977 in Dublin, Ireland) is a hip-hop artist and MC. Roc's lyrics reflect modern-day urban Irish culture and deal with social injustice.

Because of Roc's ability to express intelligent social commentary via a unique musical blend, he was selected to perform with LL Cool J. He was also chosen to perform with Jay-Z in the Point Depot in 2006.

In 2006, Roc completed his debut album titled Inspired. In February 2006, he completed his follow-up album and shot his first music video, for the single What’s Goin On. Roc performed gigs throughout Ireland to promote this album and performed throughout Britain in summer 2007. Roc also was chosen to perform with 50 Cent during his appearance at The Marquee, Cork on 4 July 2007.

Roc was lined up to perform the entrance music in front of 35,000 fans in Cardiff, Wales for Welsh boxer Joe Calzaghe before his WBO Super Middleweight title defense against Peter Manfredo Jr. in April 2007 and had previously performed the track on the Christian O'Connell breakfast show on Virgin Radio. However, he was unable to obtain sufficient clearance for the back tracking.
