= James McIntosh (food writer) =

Northern Irish food writer and television chef

- Born: Robert James McIntosh; 16 May 1978 (age 47); Portadown, County Armagh, Northern Ireland
- Education: University of Dundee
- Occupations: Food writer and television presenter
- Website: jamesmcintosh.co.uk

Robert James McIntosh (born 16 May 1978) is a food writer and television chef from Northern Ireland. He is working with Northern Ireland tourism and food producer interests to promote Northern Ireland produce. He has published several food-themed books, writes for culinary magazines, and was featured in a food-themed documentary that was produced and aired in China. McIntosh has made frequent appearances on Chinese television as a 'celebrity chef'.

== Early life ==
James McIntosh was born and raised on a farm in the townland of Ballylisk in Northern Ireland. His father was a farmer and his mother a home economics teacher. He was educated at Moyallon Primary School, Tandragee Junior High School, and Portadown College.

McIntosh left school at age 18 with 9 GCSE and 3 A-Level qualifications. He then went to the Northern Ireland Hotel and Catering College, a part of the University of Ulster (now demolished), where he earned a Higher National Diploma in Food, Consumer and Marketing Management. Upon graduation, McIntosh moved to Scotland and graduated in 2000 with Masters of Arts in Food and Welfare Studies home economics at Duncan of Jordonstone College, University of Dundee.

== Career ==
McIntosh studied at Portadown College. He moved to London after university and became a development technologist for Ferndale Foods. He later moved to Le Cordon Bleu cookery school in London, where he wrote cookery books and student courses for Le Cordon Bleu schools globally. In 2002, he moved to the UK Good Housekeeping Institute for Good Housekeeping Magazine, where he developed domestic appliance criteria to test household appliances, both for the magazine and for independent clients. In 2004, McIntosh started his freelance career with a job share as a Home Economist for Nestlé in Croydon. He founded the London-based home economics company Whisk.

McIntosh has travelled to more than 40 countries in his career and has worked for many food and domestic appliance brands under his consultancy brand FoodNoise. He is the author of six food-themed books, including Mix, Veg and Cake. Described by Mrs Moneypenny of the Financial Times as 'Northern Ireland's answer to Martha Stewart', McIntosh served as a food ambassador for Northern Irish Connections and Food NI / Taste of Ulster.

=== AGA ===
McIntosh was appointed as a freelance AGA / Rayburn demonstrator in 2004. In 2009 he was promoted to global ambassador for AGA Rangemaster PLC and launched the AGA PRO+ in the US and Canada later that year, including a multi-city media and distributors tour. On 27 March 2015 he launched AGA and Rangemaster under the respective brands of AGATC and Redfyre at the China New World Hotel in Beijing for the joint venture with High Seasons, AGA Rangemaster's Chinese distributors. As part of the project McIntosh authored a paper titled 'Why Chinese Families Need AGA'.

=== Northern Ireland ===
In 2014 McIntosh produced a food strategy for Northern Ireland called 'Beyond the Plate' in tribute to Northern Ireland's growing artisan food producers. He states that Northern Ireland should be a place of inward food tourism due to its beautiful landscape and pure food, which he calls 'Honest Food'. The strategy has three points, and he wrote this in response to Northern Ireland Connections asking him to do something to promote Northern Ireland to the world. Food NI / Taste of Ulster also helped McIntosh in the development of this document. McIntosh gives cookery demonstrations of Northern Irish food, such as Lough Neagh eels.

=== Chinese media ===
McIntosh has presented food-themed television programming in China, including the TV series Food Adventures on the Silk Road. The 20-part series was awarded Best Documentary at the 2011 Chinese Radio and Television Awards. McIntosh appears frequently on Chinese television, including the Day Day Up show on Hunan Television as well as many local TV shows. He is a regular contributor to Global Gourmet magazine in China.
