= George Crothers =

Irish cricketer

Personal information
- Full name: George Marcus Crothers
- Born: 30 January 1909; Belfast
- Died: 5 February 1982 (aged 73); Lisburn, County Antrim
- Batting: Right-handed

International information
- National side: Ireland

Career statistics
Competition	First-class
Matches	10
Runs scored	174
Batting average	9.66
100s/50s	0/0
Top score	41
Catches/stumpings	6/3
- Source: CricketArchive, 6 December 2022

George Marcus Crothers (30 January 1909 – 5 February 1982) was an Irish cricketer. A right-handed batsman and wicket-keeper, he made his debut for the Ireland cricket team against Scotland in June 1931 and went on to play for them on 19 occasions, his last match coming in June 1948 against Yorkshire. Ten of his matches for Ireland had first-class status. Crothers captained Ireland once.
