= Bill Loughery =

Irish academic and cricketer

Personal information
- Full name: William Gordon Ridley Loughery
- Born: 1 November 1907; Belfast, Ireland
- Died: 1 August 1977 (aged 69); Abbey Dore, Herefordshire, England
- Batting: Right-handed

International information
- National side: Ireland

Career statistics
Competition	First-class
Matches	2
Runs scored	34
Batting average	11.33
100s/50s	0/0
Top score	18*
Catches/stumpings	1/–
- Source: CricketArchive, 16 November 2022

William Gordon Ridley Loughery (1 November 1907 – 1 August 1977) was an Irish academic and cricketer.

Loughery studied mathematics at Trinity College Dublin, earning his BA in 1930. From 1930 to 1934 he taught at Campbell College in Belfast. He then taught at Rugby School in England, where he was a housemaster.

== Cricket career ==
A right-handed batsman, Loughery played several times for the Ireland cricket team between 1929 and 1933 including two first-class matches against Scotland.

Loughery made his debut for Ireland in July 1929, playing a first-class match against Scotland. He played a match against "The Catamarans" later that month, twice against Sir Julien Cahn's XI in July 1930 and against the MCC in August 1930, before spending three years out of the Irish side. He returned in June 1933, bookending his career with another first-class match against Scotland.

In all matches for Ireland, Loughery scored 134 runs at an average of 12.18, with a top score of 29 against the MCC in August 1930. His top score in his two first-class games was 18 not out. He bowled just nine balls, not taking a wicket, and his bowling style is not known.
