= New Lodge, Belfast =

Area of Belfast

New Lodge, Belfast Lóiste Nua
- community
- Location within the United Kingdom
- Coordinates: 54°36′40″N 5°55′56″W

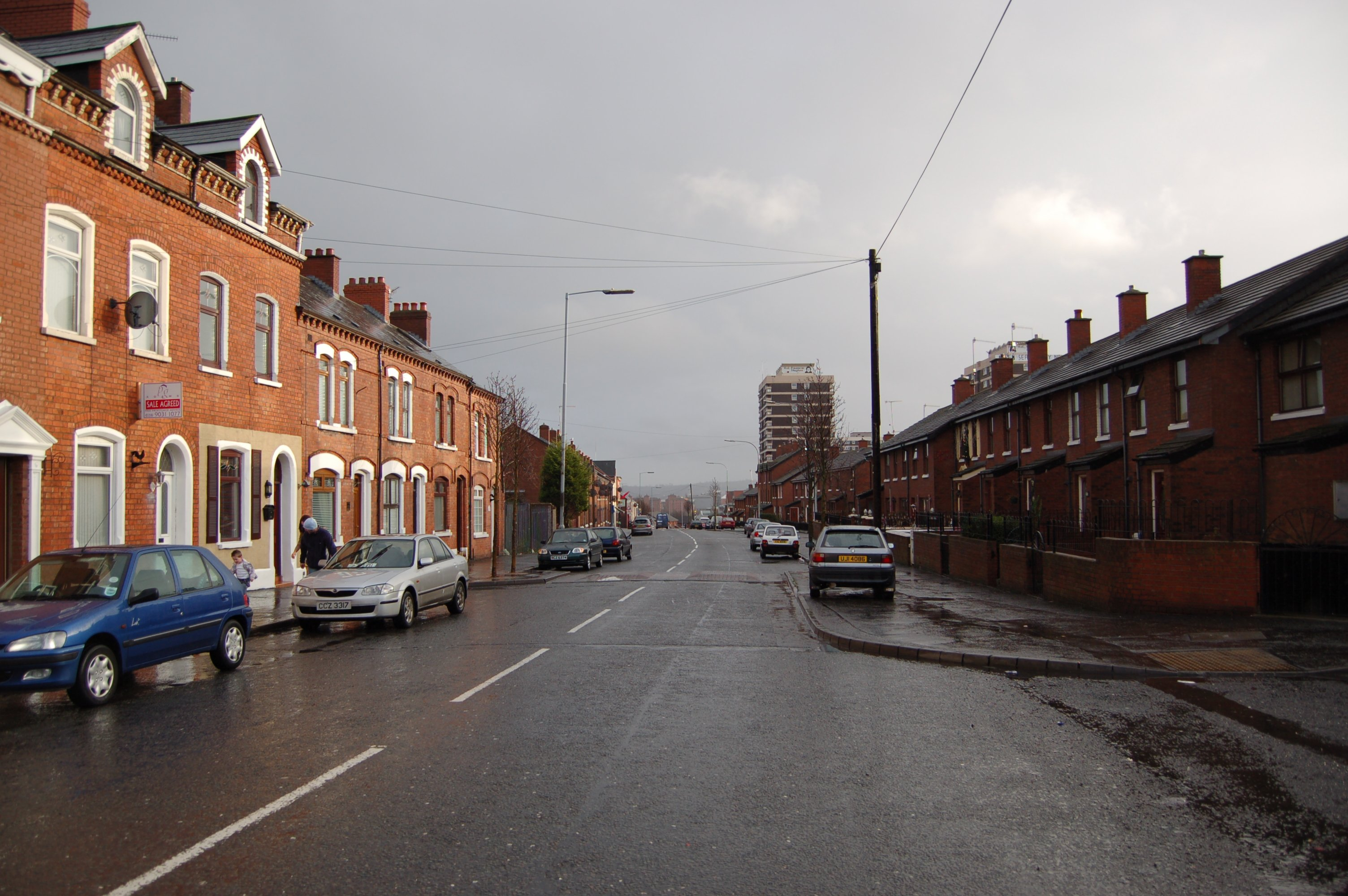
Top of the New Lodge Road near its junction with the Antrim Road

The New Lodge is an urban, working class Catholic community in Belfast, Northern Ireland, immediately to the north of the city centre. The landscape is dominated by several large tower blocks. The area has a number of murals, mostly sited along the New Lodge Road. The locality is demarcated by Duncairn Gardens, Antrim Road, Clifton Street, and dependent on opinion, York Street or North Queen Street. North Queen Street and Duncairn Gardens have often seen rioting between republicans and loyalists. The New Lodge is also an electoral ward of Belfast City Council.

== History ==
The area now known as the New Lodge was once open farmland within the original 17th-century city walls of the town of Belfast.

The name of the area probably derives from the farm lodge at Solitude, now the location of the home ground of Cliftonville F.C. The Old Lodge Road, now largely demolished, ran from Peter's Hill to the bottom of the Oldpark Road, while the New Lodge Road would have continued along the line of the modern Cliftonville Road.

With Belfast's explosive expansion as an industrial city in the 19th century, the New Lodge developed as a built up, inner-city area; its residents came from both the Protestant and Catholic communities. The area between Lepper Street and the Antrim Road was largely filled with slum housing for the workers in the Lepper Mill, while the area between York Street and North Queen Street provided the same standard of accommodation for workers in the Gallagher tobacco factory and York Street Mill on York Street.

The area between the New Lodge Road and Duncairn Gardens was historically occupied by the better-off working-class families, while Duncairn Gardens itself and Clifton Street were upmarket well into the 20th century.

Victoria Barracks, a major British army barracks, was an important feature of the area. The only remnants of it are the street name where about 10 former officers' houses remain in use today, the old barrack wall (on North Queen Street beside the police station) and the former army gym, now a social centre known locally as "The Recy."

The New Lodge was heavily damaged in the Belfast Blitz in 1941, in which many streets were laid waste by the concentrated bombing on the nearby factories, mills and army barracks; Burke Street, which ran between Dawson and Annadale streets was completely levelled in the 15–16 April Easter Tuesday raid, with all its inhabitants killed. The subsequent destruction of large swathes of housing stock began a process of movement to the suburbs and depopulation which continues to the present. After the Second World War, many people from the New Lodge moved to new housing developments in suburban areas like Ballymurphy, New Barnsley, Rathcoole and Glengormley.

In the 1950s, the army barracks was closed and the area was redeveloped with a mixture of low-rise and tower block buildings. Much of the population of the Sailortown area of Belfast's docklands moved here in the 1960s.

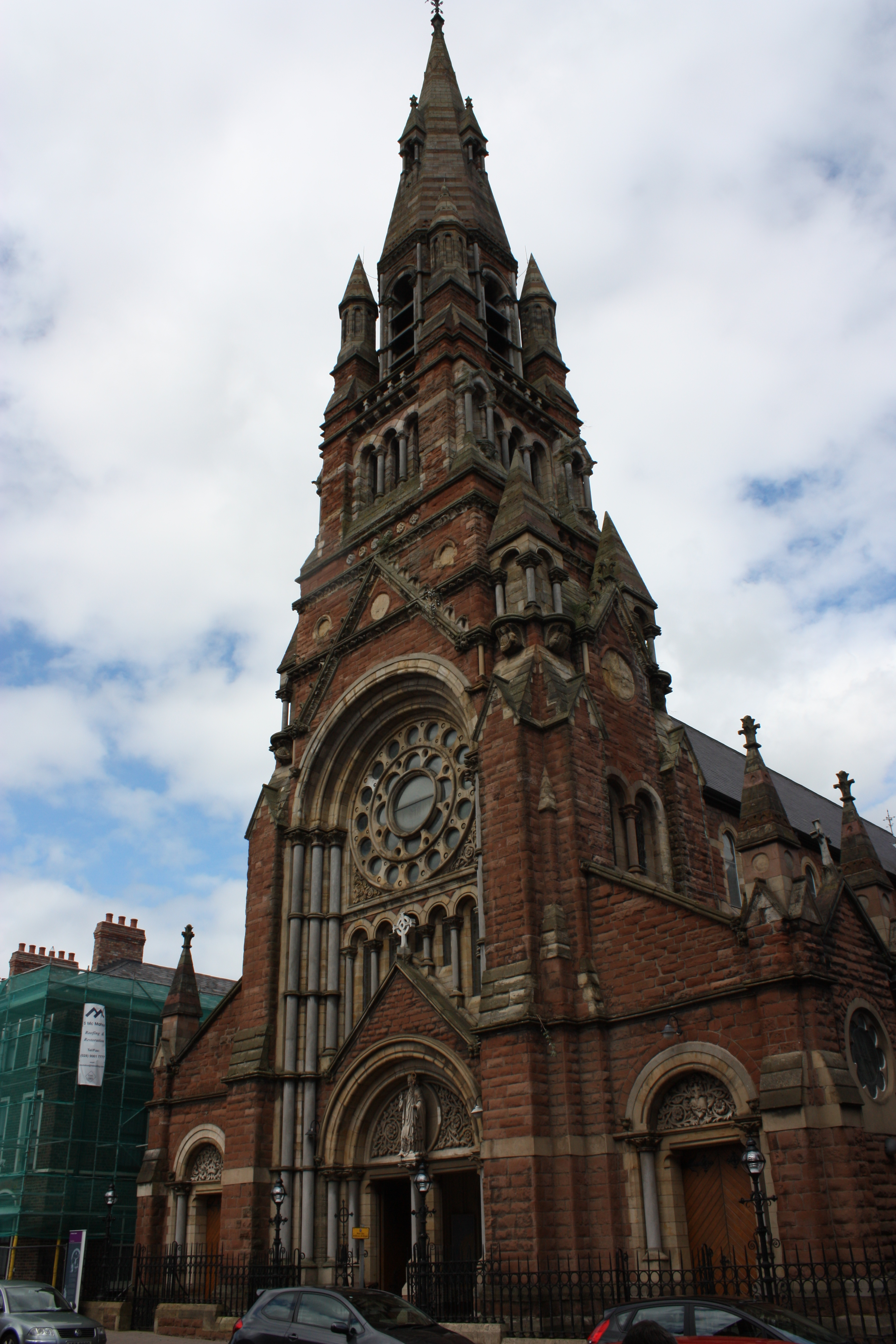
The local Catholic church is St. Patrick's on Donegall Street.

The New Lodge, on the edge of the city centre, with a history of active Irish republicanism and surrounded by Loyalist areas saw much violence during the Troubles. The few remaining Protestants left the area in the early 1970s as it came under increasing attack by Loyalists. They were replaced by Catholics intimidated from Loyalist areas of Belfast.

The McGurk's Bar bombing occurred in the area on 4 December 1971 in North Queen Street; after initially being blamed on the Provisional Irish Republican Army, it was claimed by the Ulster Volunteer Force.

As a stronghold of the Third Battalion of the Provisional IRA's Belfast Brigade, rioting and gun battles between the IRA and the British Army and loyalist paramilitaries were almost daily occurrences during the early 1970s and other periods of high political tension such as the 1981 Irish hunger strike and occurred sporadically during the rest of that period. The area was vulnerable to attacks by Loyalist paramilitaries throughout the Troubles, particularly to drive-by shootings. The corner of the New Lodge Road and the Antrim Road was statistically the most dangerous spot to stand at in Northern Ireland. The last fatal IRA attack in the area before the ceasefire came in August 1992, when guardsman Damien Shackleton was killed by a sniper.

Despite this daily life proceeded and the area benefitted from housing improvement and slum clearance during the 1980s, with new high standard public housing. However, despite this, the improvement in the general economic situation and the IRA and Loyalist ceasefires of 1994, depopulation continued apace as people left for the suburbs.

In recent years, Northern Ireland has become an attractive destination for many immigrants from the developing world and Eastern Europe, with the New Lodge seeing immigration from Poland, Latvia and Lithuania since the expansion of the European Union in 2004.

== Local politics ==
The Dock Ward was one of 15 wards of Belfast City Council prior to 1973. Its boundaries were the Antrim Road, Clifton Street, North Queen St, Great George's Street and Brougham Street. From 1973 to 1985 the eastern boundary of the New Lodge ward was North Queen Street. The boundaries were extended to York Street and Clifton Park Avenue in 1985. In 1993 the Antrim Road boundary was restored with the Unity flats area added. These boundaries are used for census information.

The Dock Ward of Belfast City Council mainly returned Unionists with slim majorities in the pre-War years, with Nationalists winning from the 1940s and becoming more dominant as time moved on. In the post-War years, the New Lodge was historically the political stronghold of Gerry Fitt.

The co-terminous Stormont parliamentary constituency was the most marginal constituency, changing hands at every election until 1965. It was won by the Ulster Unionist Party in 1929, Northern Ireland Labour Party in 1933, Unionists in 1938, NILP in 1945, Unionists in 1949, Irish Labour in 1953, Unionists in 1958, Irish Labour (Gerry Fitt) in 1962, and Republican Labour (Fitt again) in 1965 and 1969.

The Westminster parliamentary constituency was part of East Belfast until the 1974 elections and has formed part of North Belfast since then (although the areas east of North Queen Street were in West Belfast from 1983 to 1997).

Politically, Sinn Féin now dominate the area although previously parts of the area were, along with the Lower Falls, one of the strongest areas for Official Republicanism in Belfast – especially the areas around the Carlisle estate and Henry Street. Seamus Lynch was elected for the Republican Clubs and their successor parties between 1977 and 1993 and a social club for supporters of the Workers Party and Official IRA survived until the late 80s.

== Social conditions ==
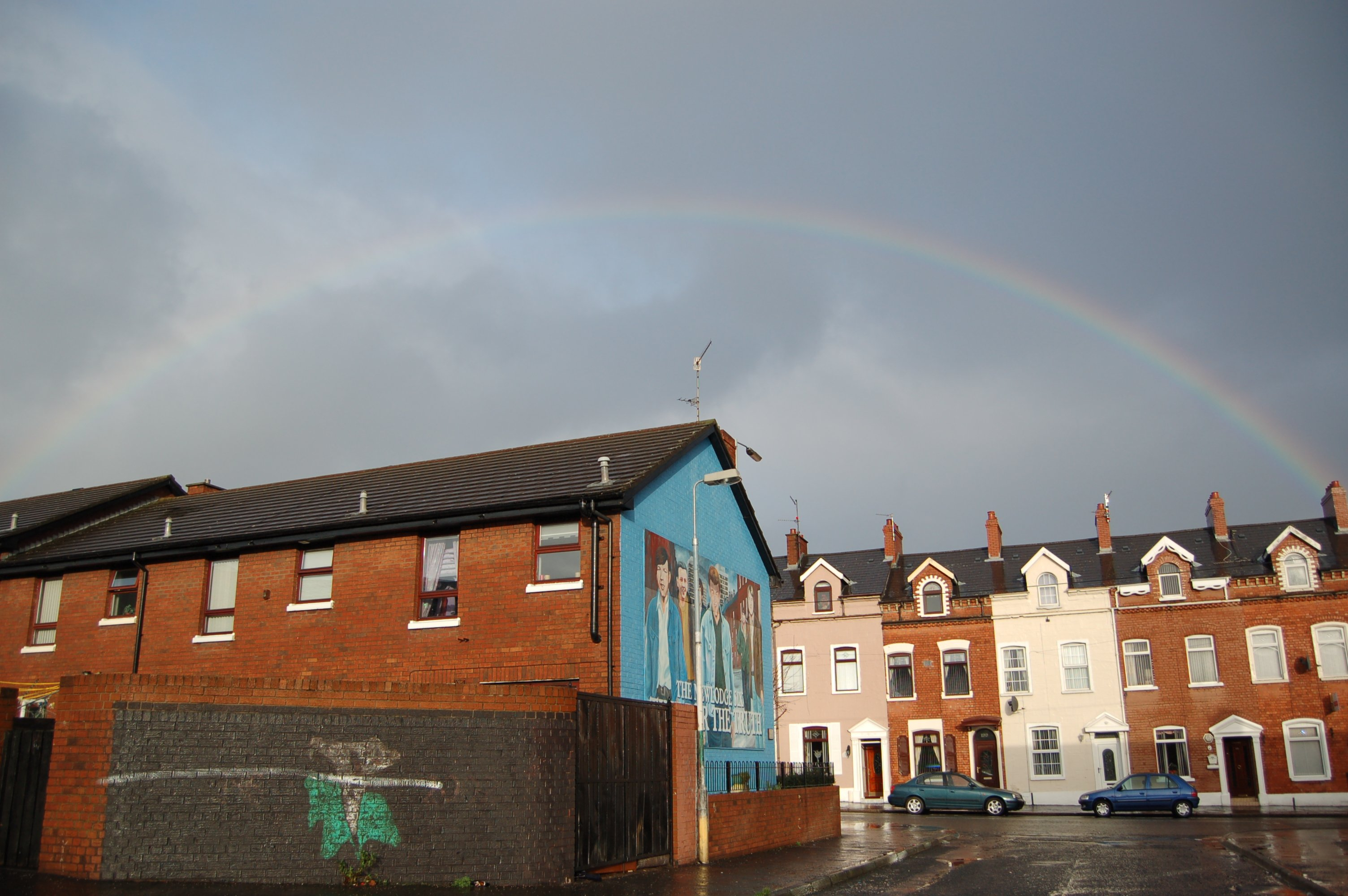
A rainbow over Donore Court, with Republican murals

While the housing stock is now largely of a high standard, and the Belfast economy has improved dramatically from the nadir of the 1980s, the New Lodge remains an area of considerable social deprivation.

The Northern Ireland Index of Multiple Deprivation lists the New Lodge as the fifth most deprived of 581 wards in Northern Ireland, and the second most deprived in terms of income. The high score comes in spite of it being the least deprived of the 581 in terms of access to services, lying on the edge of the city centre and with major health and education facilities nearby. 70.8% of the local school population are entitled to free school meals.

Less than a quarter of households in the New Lodge own their own homes, with the vast majority renting from the Northern Ireland Housing Executive or other social landlords.

40.4% of local 16-year-olds gained five or more good GCSEs in 2002, well below the Northern Ireland average, but higher than most similarly deprived areas in England. 27.7% of 18-year-olds went on to further or higher education in the same year.

With increasing property prices in the Belfast area in recent years, a higher proportion of younger and better qualified people have stayed in the area with affordable property which is within walking distance of the city centre.

The graveyard in Henry Place houses the graves of many people prominent in Belfast's history, most notably United Irishman Henry Joy McCracken

The area is quite close to all amenities including the City Centre, the Mater Hospital and Cityside (Yorkgate) Shopping Centre. A previous attempt was made to establish a local supermarket at the Ashton Centre however this failed after the opening of the Yorkgate complex in 1991.

== Culture ==
In common with similar areas, much local cultural and social life revolves around the pub scene, in the New Lodge itself and in the nearby Docks area. Live rock, blues, techno and Irish traditional music are regularly performed.

The New Lodge Festival was devised as an alternative to the traditional Internment Night bonfire, which often led to violence. The festival is linked to the West Belfast Festival and Ardoyne fleadh and sees a wide range of musical events, children's activities, amateur sport and historical and cultural discussions.

Many local people are passionate football fans. Gaelic football and boxing are also popular – Hugh Russell, who won a flyweight bronze medal in the 1980 Moscow Olympics came from the area and lived nearby until his death in 2023. Another local boxer, Sam Storey, became the third Irishman to win the Lonsdale Belt in 1995, ten years after Russell did so. Martin Lynch, playwright, Sam Millar, novelist, Joe McWilliams, painter, Joe Lindsay, presenter and DJ.

In September 2011, pop star Rihanna chose to film scenes for her music video We Found Love in the New Lodge area.

New Lodge was the setting for an award-winning documentary, The Flats in 2024. The film explores memories of The Troubles, enacted by residents of New Lodge.

== 2001 Census ==
The New Lodge is one of the 60 wards of Belfast City Council. On Census day (29 April 2001) there were 5,224 people living in New Lodge ward. Of these:

- 25.7% were under 16 years old and 18.4% were aged 60 and above;
- 46.6% of the population were male and 53.4% were female; and
- 97.3% were from a Catholic Community Background and 2.2% were from a 'Protestant and Other Christian (including Christian related)' Community Background.

For more details see: NI Neighbourhood Information Service

== Notable people ==
Gerry Fitt, politician who lived there for many years

Sir John Lavery, painter

Roger McCorley, Irish republican activist

Carál Ní Chuilín, politician

Hugh Russell, boxer

Eddie Patterson, footballer and manager

Brian Moore, famous Irish novelist

Sam Storey, boxer

== See also ==
- Belfast Central (Northern Ireland Parliament constituency)
- Belfast Dock (Northern Ireland Parliament constituency)
