= 2010 in Wales =

- Centuries: 19th; 20th; 21st
- Decades: 1990s; 2000s; 2010s; 2020s
- See also: List of years in Wales; Timeline of Welsh history 2010 in The United Kingdom England Scotland Elsewhere Welsh football: 2009–10 • 2010–11

This article is about the particular significance of the year 2010 to Wales and its people.

== Incumbents ==
- First Minister – Carwyn Jones
- Secretary of State for Wales
  - Peter Hain (until 11 May)
  - Cheryl Gillan
- Archbishop of Wales – Barry Morgan, Bishop of Llandaff
- Archdruid of the National Eisteddfod of Wales – Jim Parc Nest

== Events ==
=== January–June ===
- 1 January – Welsh people honoured by The Queen in the 2010 New Year Honours List include Menna Richards, Director of BBC Cymru Wales (OBE) and banker Dyfrig John (CBE).
- 6 January – School closures and icy road conditions result from heavy snow in most areas of Wales.
- 7 January – A report issued by the Ministry of Defence concludes that the two RAF pilots involved in the Porthcawl mid-air collision over Kenfig in March 2009 "did not see each other".
- 11 January – The HM Land Registry office in Swansea (High Street) closes as a result of the Land Registration (Proper Office) Order 2009. The Wales Office of the Land Registry, situated in Llansamlet, Swansea, remains open.
- 12 January – Further heavy snow hits south and west Wales, as local authorities begin to run out of grit to treat roads.
- 12 February – Welsh Secretary Peter Hain and Assembly Environment Minister Jane Davidson announce plans to make the M4 in Wales a "hydrogen highway", with alternative energy refuelling points.
- 5 February – Dame Tanni Grey-Thompson is recommended by the House of Lords Appointments Commission as one of four new non-party-political peers.

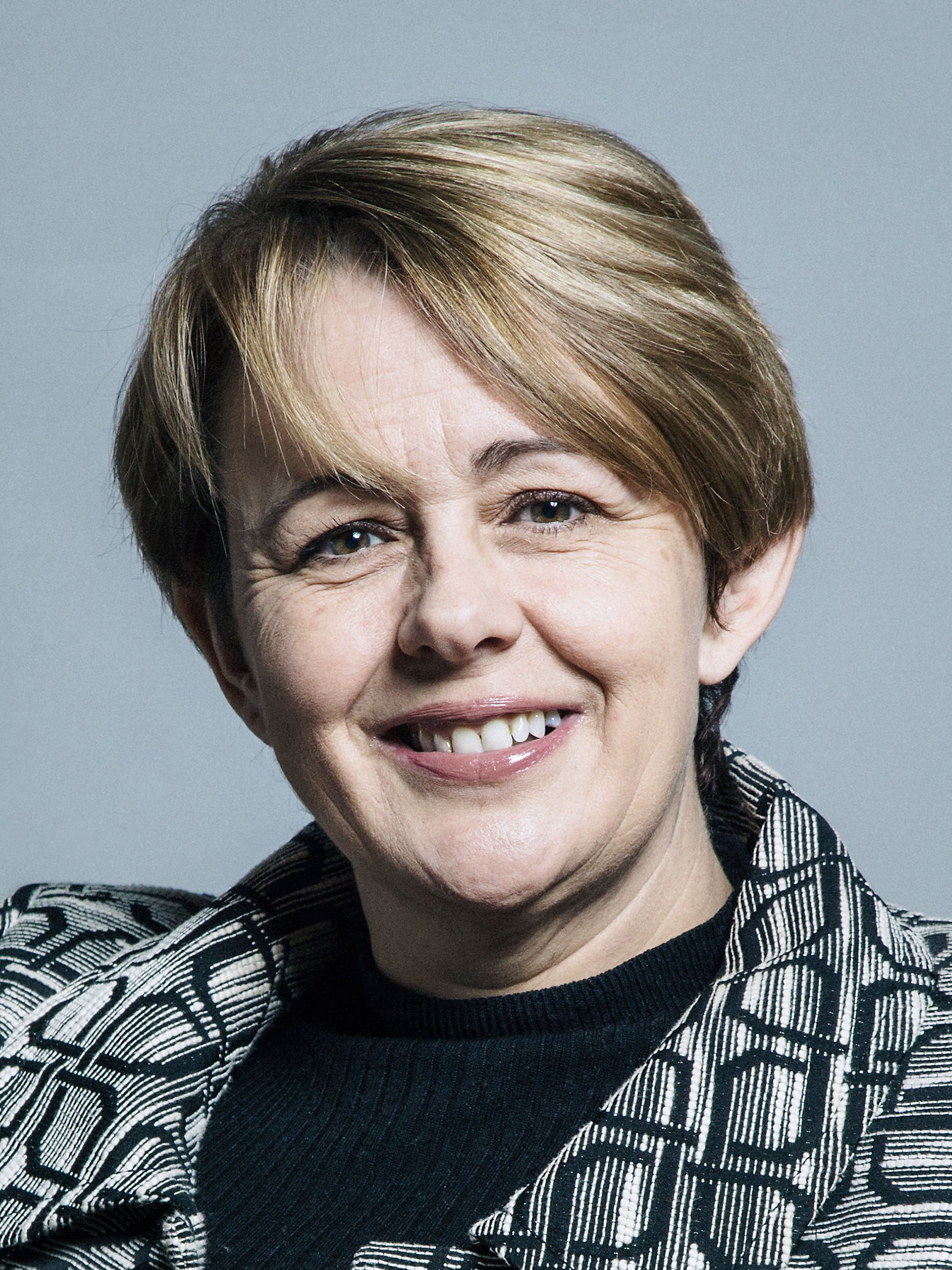
Baroness Grey-Thompson

- 14 February – Welsh rugby international Andy Powell is arrested near Junction 33 on the M4 motorway at 0600 GMT 14 February 2010, in possession of a stolen golf buggy.
- 15 February – For behaviour "contrary to the squad's code of conduct", Andy Powell is removed from Wales' 35-man training squad for the 2010 Six Nations Championship.
- 1 March – A BBC poll suggests that support has risen for full law-making powers for the Welsh Assembly, up to 56%, with 35% against, although Nick Bourne the leader of the Welsh Conservative Party (who supported a yes vote) is sceptical of the poll results.
- 16 March – Welsh Slate announces the closure of Oakeley Quarry at Blaenau Ffestiniog.
- 17 March – Government figures show that the unemployment rate in Wales, at 9.2% is higher than any other home country and higher than all but two other regions of the UK.
- 18 March – The Marriage (Wales) Act 2010 brings the Church in Wales's marriage regulations into line with those of the Church of England.
- 16 April – Four men are killed and a fifth is seriously injured in a car crash near Porthcawl.
- 6 May – In the United Kingdom general election, the Conservative Party wins 8 seats, Labour 26, Plaid Cymru 3 and the Lib Democrats 3.
- 12 May – Cheryl Gillan is confirmed as Secretary of State for Wales in the new UK government of David Cameron; she is the first woman to hold the post.

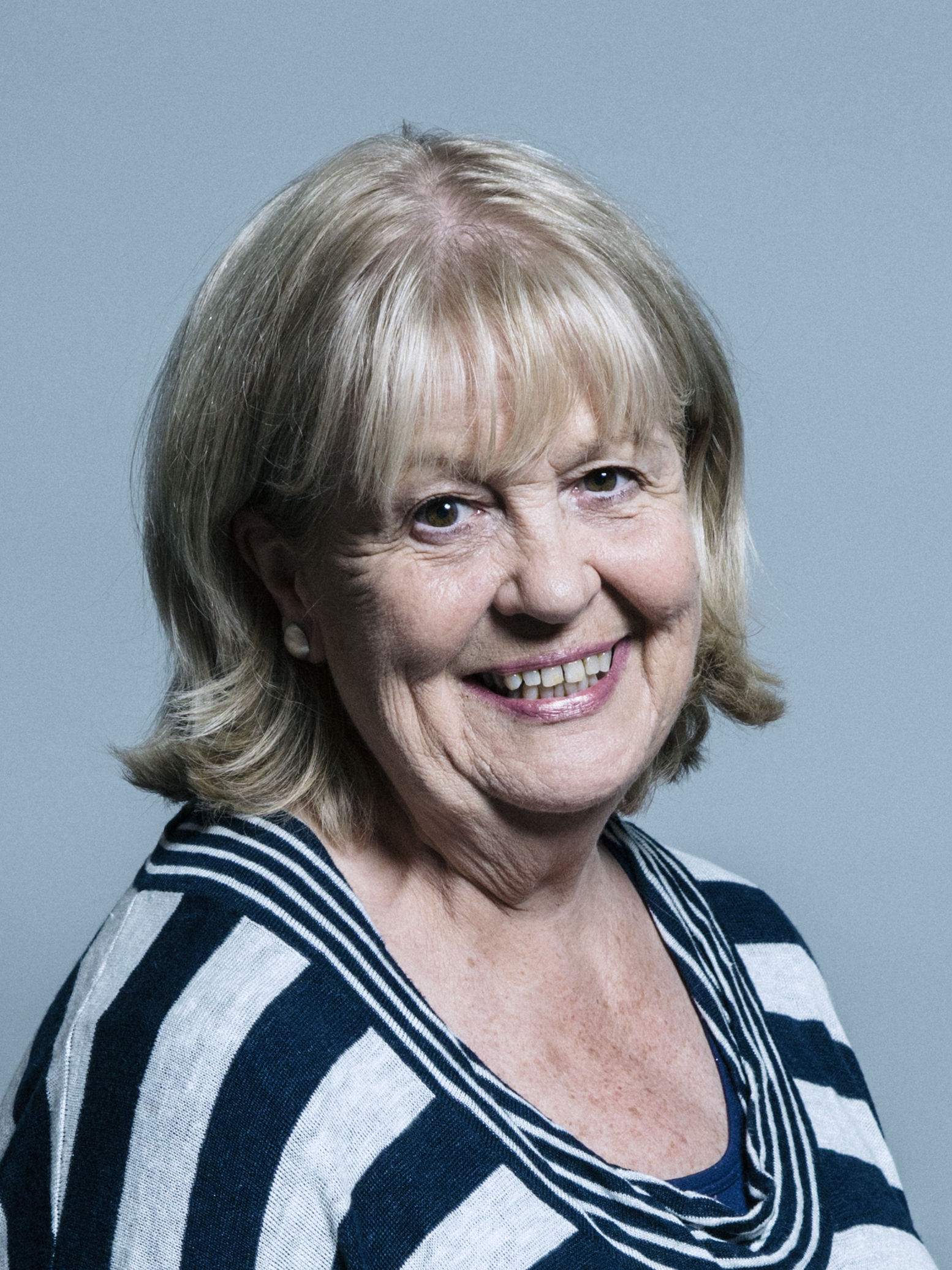
Cheryl Gillan

- 25 May – The Learned Society of Wales is launched.
- 28 May – Llanrwst celebrates the 400th anniversary of the almshouses built by Sir John Wynn, 1st Baronet.
- 15 June – Cheryl Gillan, the new Welsh Secretary in the Conservative—Liberal Democrat coalition government at Westminster, announces that the 2011 Welsh devolution referendum will probably be held between January and March 2011.
- 16 June – New members of the Gorsedd are announced by the National Eisteddfod of Wales. They include Tim Rhys-Evans, Edwin Regan and Jill Evans.
- 23 June – A Danish tabloid newspaper accuses Stephen Kinnock, who is married to Danish politician Helle Thorning-Schmidt, of tax evasion.
- 24 June – Barry-born Julia Gillard becomes Australia's first female prime minister.
- 28 June – The Archbishop of Canterbury, Rowan Williams, unveils a new memorial on the site of Six Bells Colliery. The sculpture, Guardian (of the Valleys) by Sebastien Boyesen, commemorates the pit disaster of 1960 and is a tribute to those who work in dangerous industries.

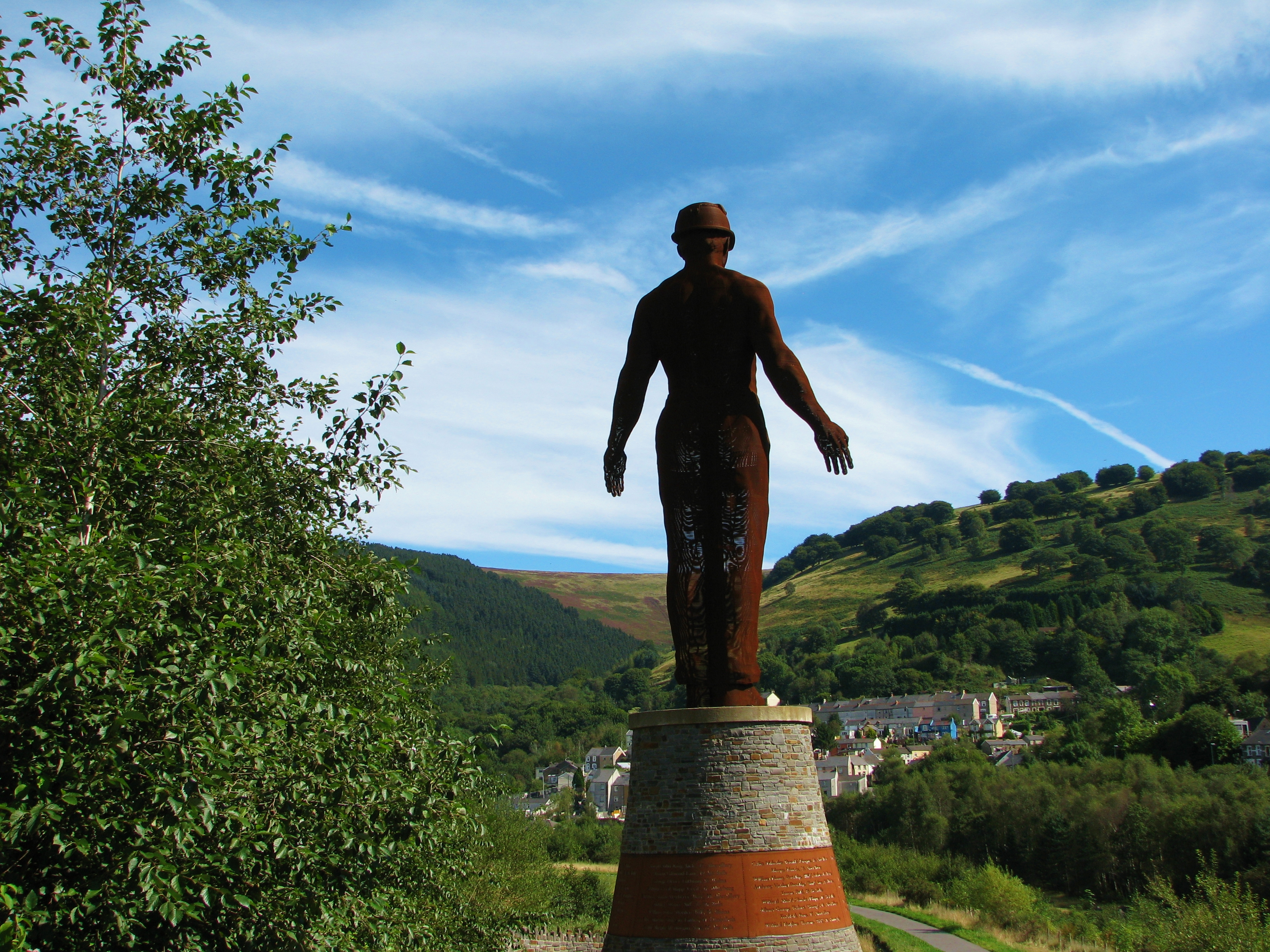
The Guardian of the Valleys

=== July–December ===
- 1 July – Wales's four archaeological trusts launch an online searchable website, known as Archwilio, at the Treftadaeth Conference in Swansea. Alun Ffred Jones AM, Minister for Heritage, observes: "Wales is the first country in Britain that has made all its archaeological records available online" and "Archwilio will be a tremendous asset not only for the people of Wales but also for those further afield who have an interest in the rich archaeology and cultural heritage of our country".
- 5 August – The Faenol Festival is cancelled for the second year running.
- 23 August – The remains of Anglesey-born MI6 worker Gareth Williams are discovered locked in a sports bag at his Pimlico flat.
- 29 August – Air-sea rescue services begin a frantic search for missing kayaker Elizabeth Ashbee, who became separated from four colleagues in rough waters and bad weather at Ynys Feurig near Rhosneigr, Anglesey. Her body is found in Caernarfon Bay two days later.
- September – The University of Wales Trinity Saint David, created by the merger of Trinity University College and the University of Wales, Lampeter, admits its first students.
- 5 September – Holly Stuckey, a pupil at Ysgol Maesteg School, is taken to hospital suffering from an allergic reaction, but dies shortly afterwards. Her parents later claim she was severely bullied at the school.
- 13 September – Archaeologists working at Caerleon announce the discovery of a suit of Roman armour.
- 22 September – Sainsbury's original Newport store closes and a new superstore opens in Crindau.
- 4 November – The accident report on the Porthcawl mid-air collision over Kenfig of March 2009 is released. The AAIB makes no safety recommendations, referring instead to the recommendations made in January's Ministry of Defence inquiry report.
- 16 November – Buckingham Palace confirms that Prince William of Wales will marry Catherine Middleton in 2011. Her title following the marriage would be dependent on whether an additional title were conferred on the prince.
- 19 November – The Welsh Pony and Cob Society opens a museum at its new headquarters near Felinfach.
- 28 December – Andrew Craig, of Caernarfon, completes the challenge of climbing Snowdon every week for a year, thus earning £15000 for charity.

=== Undated ===
- Both major chemical production plants at Cefn Mawr shut down.

== Arts and culture ==
- 3 April – New Llandaff Cathedral organ first played.
- 13 May – Only Men Aloud! win the Album of the Year award at the Classical BRIT Awards.
- 31 March – Wenvoe transmitting station turns off its remaining analogue television signals, officially completing the switchover to digital television in Wales.
- 20 September – David Essex marries Welsh actress Susan Hallam-Wright at St Cross Church in Talybont, near Bangor.
- 8 October – Cardiff-based author Belinda Bauer wins the Crime Writers' Association Gold Dagger for her debut novel Blacklands.

=== Awards ===
- Glyndŵr Award – David Nash
- National Eisteddfod of Wales: Chair – Tudur Hallam
- National Eisteddfod of Wales: Crown – Glenys Mair Glyn Roberts
- National Eisteddfod of Wales: Drama Medal – withheld
- National Eisteddfod of Wales: Prose Medal – Jerry Hunter
- Gwobr Goffa Daniel Owen – Grace Roberts
- Wales Book of the Year:
  - English language: Philip Gross – I Spy Pinhole Eye
  - Welsh language: John Davies – Cymru: Y 100 lle i’w gweld cyn marw
- Dylan Thomas Prize: Elyse Fenton – Clamor
- Kyffin Art Prize:

=== New books ===
==== English language ====
- Gladys Mary Coles – Clay
- J. Graham Jones – David Lloyd George and Welsh Liberalism
- Patrick McGuinness – Jilted City
- Jamie Owen – Around Wales by B-Roads and Byways
- M. Wynn Thomas – In the Shadow of the Pulpit
- Stan Stennett – Fully Booked
- Nikolai Tolstoy – The Oldest British Prose Literature: the Compilation of the Four Branches of the Mabinogi

==== Welsh language ====
- Fflur Dafydd – Awr y Locustiaid
- Mari Emlyn (ed.) – Llythyrau'r Wladfa 1945–2010
- Hywel Griffiths – Dirgelwch y Bont
- Angharad Price – Caersaint
- Dewi Prysor v Lladd Duw

=== Music ===
- Noise pop band Joanna Gruesome formed in Cardiff.

==== Classical ====
- Huw Watkins – Violin Concerto

==== Albums ====
- Attack! Attack! – The Latest Fashion
- Charlotte Church – Back to Scratch
- Colorama – BOX
- Duffy – Endlessly
- Katherine Jenkins – Katherine Jenkins: Believe Live From The O2
- Tom Jones – Praise & Blame
- Al Lewis – In the Wake
- Manic Street Preachers – Postcards From a Young Man
- Y Niwl – Y Niwl

==== Singles ====
- Duffy (singer) – "Well, Well, Well"
- Katherine Jenkins – "Tell Me I'm Not Dreaming"

== Film ==
=== English-language ===
- Rhys Ifans plays the title role in Mr. Nice, as Howard Marks.
- Patagonia, starring Matthew Rhys
- Michael Sheen stars in Unthinkable
- Third Star, set in Pembrokeshire

=== Welsh-language ===
- Patagonia

== Broadcasting ==
=== Welsh-language television ===
- Only Men Aloud
- Rhestr Nadolig Wil

=== English-language television ===
- Hidden Houses of Wales (with Laurence Llewelyn-Bowen)
- Rhod Gilbert's Work Experience
- Sherlock, produced by BBC Wales
- The Special Relationship (TV film) starring Michael Sheen as Tony Blair.
- Snowdonia 1890

== Sport ==
- 4 April – Mark Williams wins his third China Open title.
- 18 September – Boxer Nathan Cleverly defeats Karo Murat at the LG Arena in Birmingham in an eliminator for the WBO light heavyweight title.
- October – At the 2010 Commonwealth Games, Wales wins medals in several sports:

Medal	Name	Sport	Event	Date
Gold	Dai Greene	Athletics	Men's 400 m hurdles	10 October
Gold	Robert Weale	Lawn bowls	Men's singles	13 October
Silver	Jazmin Carlin	Aquatics	Women's 200 m freestyle	5 October
Silver	Carys Parry	Athletics	Women's Hammer Throw	6 October
Silver	Becky James	Cycling	Women's sprint	7 October
Silver	Michaela Breeze	Weightlifting	Women's 63 kg	7 October
Silver	Jenny McLoughlin	Athletics	Women's 100m T37	8 October
Silver	Sean McGoldrick	Boxing	Bantamweight	13 October
Silver	Francesca Jones	Gymnastics	Women's rhythmic individual hoop	14 October
Bronze	Becky James	Cycling	Women's 500 m Time Trial	5 October
Bronze	Jemma Lowe	Aquatics	Women's 100 m Butterfly	7 October
Bronze	Jazmin Carlin	Aquatics	Women's 400 m freestyle	7 October
Bronze	Georgia Davies	Aquatics	Women's 50 m backstroke	7 October
Bronze	Christian Malcolm	Athletics	Men's 200 m	10 October
Bronze	Rhys Williams	Athletics	Men's 400 m hurdles	10 October
Bronze	Anwen Butten & Hannah Smith	Lawn bowls	Women's pairs	11 October
Bronze	Keiran Harding	Boxing	Middleweight (75kg)	11 October
Bronze	Jermaine Asare	Boxing	Light Heavyweight (81kg)	11 October
Bronze	Johanne Brekke	Shooting	Women's 50m Rifle Prone (Singles)	12 October

- 5 December – Gareth Bale wins the BBC Cymru Wales Sports Personality of the Year award
- 27 December – The Welsh National steeplechase, scheduled to be held at Chepstow, is postponed from its traditional spot because of adverse weather conditions.

== Deaths ==
- 2 January – John Rhys Evans, operatic baritone, 79
- 4 January – Hywel Teifi Edwards, writer and broadcaster, 74
- 20 January – Jack Parry, footballer, 86
- 9 February – Malcolm Vaughan, singer and actor, 80
- 11 February – Brian Godfrey, footballer, 69
- 14 February – Dick Francis, jockey and novelist, 89
- 22 February – Robin Davies, actor, 56 (lung cancer)
- 23 February – Wyn Morris, conductor, 81
- 3 March – Michael Foot, politician, 96
- 10 March – Micky Jones, musician, 63
- 13 March – Neville Meade, heavyweight boxer, 61
- 31 March – Keith Kissack, historian of Monmouth, 96
- 9 April – John Griffiths, curator of the London Science Museum, 57
- 14 April
  - Tom Ellis, politician, 86
  - Frank Jackett, footballer, 82
- 29 April (in London) – Harold Rubens, pianist and human rights activist, 90
- 30 April – Gwyn Rowlands, rugby union international, 81
- 8 May
- 14 October – J. A. G. Griffith, lawyer and academic, 91
  - Alan Watkins, political journalist, 77
- 7 June – Stuart Cable, musician and television presenter, 40
- 22 June – Pennant Roberts, TV producer, 69
- 23 June – Peter Walker, Baron Walker of Worcester, former Secretary of State for Wales, 78
- 20 July – Iris Gower, novelist, 75
- 21 July
  - Lowri Gwilym, television and radio producer, 55 (cerebral haemorrhage)
  - Jimmy Singer, footballer, 72
- August – Gareth Williams, intelligence officer, 31
- 10 August – Brian Clark, Cardiff City footballer, 67
- 13 August – A. J. R. Russell-Wood, historian, 70
- 30 August – Owen Edwards, broadcaster, 76
- 16 September – Richard Livsey, Baron Livsey of Talgarth, politician, 75
- 18 October – Mel Hopkins, footballer, 75
- 27 October – William Griffiths, hockey player, 88
- 28 October – Robert Dickie, British champion boxer, 46 (heart attack)
- 9 December – Meirion Pennar, poet and academic, 65
- 26 December – Vivien Jones, lacrosse player, 59

== See also ==
- 2010 in Northern Ireland
