= Jackett =

Jackett is a surname. Notable people with the surname include:

- Frank Jackett (1927–2010), Welsh footballer
- Gordon Jackett (1887–1951), Australian politician
- John Jackett (politician) (1912–2003), Australian politician
- John Jackett (rugby union) (1878–1935), English international rugby union player, brother of Richard
- Kenny Jackett (born 1962), Welsh international footballer
- Richard Jackett (1880–1960), Cornish rugby union player, brother of Edward
- Wilbur Jackett (1912–2005), Canadian public servant and chief justice

== See also ==
- Jackett (clothing), a type of jacket
