= 2010 in Scotland =

- Centuries: 19th; 20th; 21st
- Decades: 1990s; 2000s; 2010s; 2020s
- See also: List of years in Scotland; Timeline of Scottish history 2010 in: The UK • England • Wales • Elsewhere; Scottish football: 2009–10 • 2010–11; 2010 in Scottish television

Events from the year 2010 in Scotland.

== Incumbents ==
- First Minister and Keeper of the Great Seal – Alex Salmond
- Secretary of State – Jim Murphy (to 11 May 2010), Danny Alexander (12 May 2010 – 29 May 2010), Michael Moore (from 29 May).

=== Law officers ===
- Lord Advocate – Elish Angiolini
- Solicitor General for Scotland – Frank Mulholland
- Advocate General for Scotland – Lord Davidson of Glen Clova; then Lord Wallace of Tankerness

=== Judiciary ===
- Lord President of the Court of Session and Lord Justice General – Lord Hamilton
- Lord Justice Clerk – Lord Gill
- Chairman of the Scottish Land Court – Lord McGhie

== Events ==
=== January ===
- 5 January – Scotland as well as most of the UK is deluged by some of the heaviest snow in thirty years, causing widespread transport problems and school closures.

=== April ===
- 20 April – To correspond with the first ever televised leader's debates in the UK, leaders of the main political parties in Scotland including the Scottish Labour Party, Scottish Conservative Party, the Scottish Liberal Democrats and the Scottish National Party will hold a televised debate, broadcast on ITV1.

=== May ===
- 4 May – An ash cloud emitted from the Icelandic volcano Eyjafjallajökull causes most Scottish and Northern European airports to be closed until further notice.
- 6 May – United Kingdom general election: with no Scottish seats changing hands, Labour maintains a stronghold in Scotland holding 41 out of 59 Scottish Westminster seats. The Liberal Democrats have 11 seats, the Scottish National Party 6 seats and the Conservative Party maintain their single Scottish seat
- 15 May –
  - Newly appointed Prime Minister David Cameron travels to Scotland for talks with First Minister Alex Salmond. Both later agree that the talks were "productive" and it is agreed that Cameron would address the Scottish Parliament once every year and in return, MSP's could address Commons' committees in Westminster.
  - Dundee United F.C. win the Scottish Cup with a 3–0 victory over Ross County at Hampden Park.
- 29 May – Following the resignation of the Chief Secretary of the Treasury David Laws, the incumbent Liberal Democrat Scottish Secretary, Danny Alexander, assumes his position and the Deputy Leader of the Scottish Liberal Democrats, Michael Moore, becomes the new Scottish secretary.

=== June ===
- 8 June – Eight people injured after a train derails in Argyll.
- 10 June – A man dies after being shot outside his home in Lanarkshire.

=== July ===
- 2 July – Supporters of Stirling Albion F.C. become the first in the UK to take over ownership of their club.

=== September ===
- 16 September – Pope Benedict XVI begins his four-day UK visit, starting in Scotland.

=== November ===
- 15 November – City of Glasgow College officially launched by merger (agreed during 2009) of Central College, Glasgow Metropolitan College and Glasgow College of Nautical Studies.
- 18 November – Hugh Henry MSP wins Scottish Politician of the Year award.

=== December ===
- 11 December – Scottish Transport Minister Stewart Stevenson resigns amid criticism of his handling of transport chaos brought on by recent heavy snow in Scotland.
- 12 December – Keith Brown is appointed as Scottish Transport Minister following yesterday's resignation of Stewart Stevenson.
- 13 December – Major supermarkets and online stores stop taking orders in Scotland in the run up to Christmas, because of a backlog of deliveries caused by the adverse weather conditions.
- 16 December – The Scottish Government rules out re-introducing tuition fees for Scottish university students, but students from other parts of the United Kingdom attending university in Scotland may face fees of £6,000.
- 23 December – HM Advocate v Sheridan and Sheridan: former MSP Tommy Sheridan is convicted of perjury following a twelve-week trial; his wife is acquitted.

=== Undated ===
- Star Wheel Press, a Scottish indie/folk/pop band from Aberfeldy, Scotland is formed.

== Deaths ==
- 2 January – David R. Ross, historian (born 1958)
- 7 January – Alex Parker, football player and manager (born 1935)
- 19 January – Bill McLaren, rugby union commentator (born 1923)
- 25 January – Bill Ritchie, cartoonist (born 1931)
- 28 January – Alistair Hulett, acoustic folk singer (born 1951)
- 13 February – Jock Ferguson, Australian politician (born 1946)
- 22 February – Bobby Smith, footballer (born 1953)
- 28 February – Adam Blacklaw, footballer (born 1937)
- 4 March – Ronnie Fraser, agricultural journalist and Liberal politician (born 1929)
- 11 March – Willie MacFarlane, football player and manager (born 1930)
- 12 March – Hugh Robertson, footballer (born 1939)
- 18 March – William Wolfe, chairman of Scottish National Party (1969–1979) (born 1924)
- 22 March – James W. Black, pharmacologist, winner of 1988 Nobel prize in medicine (born 1924)
- 28 March – David Carnegie, 14th Earl of Northesk, member of the House of Lords (born 1954)
- 1 April – Morag Beaton, operatic soprano (born 1926; died in Australia)
- 8 April – James Quinn, Jesuit priest, theologian and hymnodist (born 1919)
- 9 April – Kenneth McKellar, tenor (born 1927)
- 19 April – Tom Fleming, actor (born 1927)
- 21 April – Sammy Baird, footballer (born 1930)
- 1 June – John Hagart, football player and manager (born 1937)
- 21 June – Tam White, musician and actor (born 1942)
- 10 August – Jimmy Reid, trade union activist (born 1932)
- 16 August – Bobby Thomson, American baseball player (born 1923 in Scotland)
- 17 August
  - Bill Millin, British Army soldier and piper during WWII (born 1922)
  - Edwin Morgan, poet (born 1920)
- 3 September – Annie Turnbull, supercentenarian, oldest person in U.K. at date of death (born 1898)
- 28 October – Gerard Kelly, actor (born 1959)
- 25 December – Iain Noble, banker and Gaelic activist (born 1935 in Germany)
- 30 December – Jenny Wood-Allen, world record marathon runner (born 1911)

== The arts and literature ==
- 19 September – Emma's Imagination wins the television talent show Must be the Music.
- James Robertson's novel And the Land Lay Still is published.

== See also ==
- 2010 in England
- 2010 in Northern Ireland
- 2010 in Wales
