= 2010 in England =

- Centuries: 19th; 20th; 21st
- Decades: 1990s; 2000s; 2010s; 2020s
- See also: 2009–10 in English football 2010–11 in English football 2010 in the United Kingdom; Other events of 2010

Events from 2010 in England

== Incumbent ==
- Monarch - Elizabeth II
- Prime Minister - Gordon Brown (until 11 May), David Cameron (from 11 May)

== Events ==
=== January ===
- 9 January – Jazz musician Jamie Cullum marries model Sophie Dahl.
- 16 January – 108-year-old Suffolk woman Florence Green is identified as one of the world's last surviving World War I veterans – and the only female – after a historian discovered that she had served in the Women's Royal Air Force as a waitress near the end of the war.
- 24 January – Three people are charged with public order offences following an English Defence League demonstration in Stoke-on-Trent, Staffordshire.

=== February ===
- 2 February – Birmingham based confectionery giant Cadbury is taken over by American rival Kraft Foods in an £11.5billion deal.

=== March ===
- 2 March – Jon Venables, one of the two boys (then aged 11) found guilty of murdering Merseyside toddler James Bulger in 1993, is recalled to prison after breaching terms of his life licence. Venables, now 42, spent eight years in custody before being paroled along with Robert Thompson in 2001.
- 8 March – Jack Straw, the Justice Secretary, rejects ongoing public calls for the reasons that Jon Venables has been recalled to custody to be made public.
- 12 March – Birmingham couple Angela Gordon and Junaid Abuhamza received prison sentences after being convicted of the manslaughter of Ms Gordon's seven-year-old daughter Khyra Ishaq, who died as a result of starvation two years ago. Ms Gordon is sentenced to 15 years in prison, while Mr Abuhamza is sentenced to indefinite imprisonment with a recommended minimum term of seven and a half years.
- 20 March –
  - The first British Airways strike, set to last for three days, begins. More than 80 planes are grounded at Heathrow Airport alone and numerous flights are reported to have been cancelled, though British Airways officials are confident that 65% of flights will be undisturbed.
  - 67 people are arrested and several people are injured in Bolton town centre during a clash between members of the English Defence League and Unite Against Fascism.
- 30 March – Levi Bellfield, a 41-year-old man two years into a life sentence for murdering two women and attempting to murder a third, is charged with the murder of Surrey teenager Milly Dowler, who disappeared in Walton-on-Thames eight years ago and whose body was found in Hampshire woodland six months later.

=== April ===
- 6 April – The Shirley Towers fire in Southampton kills two firefighters.

=== May ===
- 6 May –
  - The 2010 General Election takes place. Though the Conservative Party wins a majority of seats in England, winning 298 of the 533 contested, the result over the whole of the UK is a hung parliament, with the Conservative Party 20 seats short of an overall majority in the House of Commons.
  - Caroline Lucas, leader of the Green Party of England and Wales, becomes the party's first Westminster MP, being elected in Brighton Pavilion, and Peter Robinson, First Minister of Northern Ireland and Democratic Unionist Party leader, unexpectedly loses his Belfast East seat to the Alliance Party.
  - Local elections are also held across England in all 32 London Boroughs, all 36 Metropolitan Boroughs, 20 Unitary Authorities and 76 Non-metropolitan districts. The Labour Party gain 15 councils to control 36 overall, the Conservatives suffer a net loss of 8 councils, leaving them in control of 65, and the Liberal Democrats suffer a net loss of 4 local authorities, being left in control of 13 councils.
- 14 May – MP Stephen Timms stabbed by Islamist Roshonara Choudhry at during his constituency surgery in an attempt to kill him.
- 24 May – A school bus collides with a Honda Civic car near Keswick, Cumbria. A 15-year-old boy and a 16-year-old girl are killed and 35 other people (most of them children aged 11 to 18) are injured. The driver of the car is also killed.
  - Education Secretary Michael Gove announces plans for all primary and secondary schools in England to be given the right to break from local council control and become academies.

=== June ===
- 2 June – Twelve people are killed and 25 injured after a gunman, identified as taxi driver Derrick Bird, goes on a killing spree in the Whitehaven, Egremont and Seascale areas of Cumbria. He is found dead, having reportedly shot himself, in woodland at Boot.
- 3 June – Police release the names of the twelve people who were killed in yesterday's shootings in Cumbria. They include Derrick Bird's 52-year-old twin brother David, the family's 60-year-old solicitor Kevin Commons, and 31-year-old Garry Purdham, brother of rugby league player Rob Purdham.
- 13 June – The England football team's World Cup campaign in South Africa begins with a disappointing 1–1 draw against the USA.
- 18 June – England's hopes of reaching the next stage of the World Cup are dealt a major blow when they are held to a goalless draw by Algeria.
- 21 June – Jon Venables, one of the two killers of Merseyside toddler James Bulger, appears in court charged with possession and distribution of indecent images of children. Venables, now 28, was released on life licence in 2001 with a new identity after serving eight years for the murder, along with Robert Thompson.
- 23 June – England qualify for the last 16 of the World Cup thanks to a 1–0 win over Slovenia in their final group game. Jermain Defoe scores the winning goal.
- 27 June – England are eliminated from the World Cup in South Africa, losing 4–1 to Germany in the second round at Bloemfontein. One other England goal is disallowed.

=== July ===
- 3 July – Christopher Brown (aged 29) is shot dead in Gateshead, Tyne and Wear, by a gunman who badly wounds his 22-year-old girlfriend Samantha Stobbart.
- 4 July – PC David Rathband is badly wounded in another shooting incident in Newcastle-upon-Tyne. The gunman is reported to be 37-year-old Raoul Moat, who is also named as a suspect for the incident in Gateshead yesterday. Mr Moat was released from prison on 1 July after spending nine weeks in prison for assault.
- 9 July – Northumbria police are reported to have found an armed man, believed to be murder suspect Raoul Moat, in the local area and are negotiating with him to persuade him to give himself up.
- 10 July – The week-long police manhunt for Raoul Moat comes to an end after he shoots himself dead following a six-hour stand off with officers in a field at Rothbury, Northumberland.
- 11 July – The British Grand Prix at Silverstone is won by Mark Webber with Lewis Hamilton in second place.
- 14 July – David Cameron condemns individuals who have left tributes to Raoul Moat; floral tributes have been left at the scene of his suicide and a Facebook group has been set up in his memory.
- 16 July – The High Court rules that Yorkshire Ripper Peter Sutcliffe, jailed for life in 1981 for murdering 13 women and attempting to murder seven others, should never be released from custody. Sutcliffe, now 64, spent the first four years of his imprisonment in a mainstream prison before being declare insane and moved to a secure mental hospital in 1985, where he has remained ever since. However, a psychiatrist's report on Sutcliffe reveals that his mental illness was now under better control.
- 23 July –
  - Jon Venables is sentenced to two years in prison after admitting distributing child pornography.
  - Gavin Grant, a former footballer who played for Millwall, Wycombe Wanderers and Bradford City, is found guilty of a murder committed in Harlesden, London, six years ago.
- 28 July – Home Secretary Theresa May announces plans to scrap the use of Anti-Social Behaviour Orders in England and Wales.
- 29 July – Metro Bank opens its first branch, in Holborn, London, the first wholly new high street bank for more than a century.

=== August ===
- 1 August – Sarah's Law, a scheme which allows parents to check if someone with access to their children is a sex offender, will be extended to cover the whole of England and Wales by Spring 2011 after proving successful in four pilot areas.
- 8 August – Government plans to scrap free school milk for the under-fives are abandoned by David Cameron amid fears it would remind voters of the "Thatcher, Milk Snatcher" episode of Edward Heath's 1970–1974 government.
- 9 August – Martin O'Neill resigns after four years as manager of FA Premier League club Aston Villa, despite having guided them to European qualification in their previous three seasons – their best run of form for over a decade.
- 17 August – Lord Pearson of Rannoch announces that he is to step down as leader of the UK Independence Party less than a year after being elected to the position, stating that he is "not much good" at party politics.
- 22 August – Brazil wins the 2010 World Blind Football Championship after beating Spain 2–0 in the final at the Royal National College for the Blind in Hereford.
- 24 August – David Cameron's wife Samantha gives birth to their fourth child, a girl, later named Florence Rose Endellion, at the Royal Cornwall Hospital whilst on holiday in Cornwall.
- 29 August – The News of the World prints evidence that the current Lord's test between England and Pakistan was rigged in a match-fixing scam.

=== September ===
- 14 September – Singer George Michael, 47, is fined £1,250 and jailed for two months after being found guilty of crashing his car after taking cannabis.
- 23 September – Official opening of Thanet Wind Farm, by Liberal Democrat MP Chris Huhne and Oystein Loseth – head of Swedish firm Vatenfall, who built the turbines at a cost of £750million over two years.
- 27 September – Labour Party activists at the conference in Manchester condemn the coalition government's proposed public spending cuts as "obscene".

=== October ===
- 5 October – The 138-year-old pier at Hastings, East Sussex, is severely damaged by fire.
- 11 October – The inquest begins into the deaths of the 52 people who were killed in the terrorist attacks on London by Al-Qaeda members on 7 July 2005.
- 15 October – American company New England Sports Ventures completes a £300million takeover of Liverpool FC.
- 30 October –
  - An explosive device is intercepted at East Midlands Airport, preventing a potential terrorist bombing of a passenger aeroplane. On the same day, a similar package is found on a cargo plane in Dubai. Al-Qaeda is suspected to have been responsible for both incidents.

=== November ===
- 4 November – The one millionth Range Rover is produced at the Land Rover factory in Solihull, 40 years after the original Range Rover was first produced.
- 5 November –
  - A specially convened Election court orders a re-run of the 2010 general election campaign in Oldham East and Saddleworth, the constituency of former Immigration Minister Phil Woolas after Woolas was found guilty of making false statements against an opponent during the original campaign.
  - Nigel Farage is re-elected as the leader of the UK Independence Party.
  - A concrete mixer lorry falls on a train near Oxshott.
- 10 November – University students riot outside the Conservative Party headquarters in Millbank, London, in protest against funding cuts and proposals to increase tuition fees.
- 16 November – Clarence House announces the engagement of Prince William, Duke of Cambridge and Catherine Middleton. The couple will marry next year.
- 17 November – Floods and gale-force winds cause widespread disruption across Cornwall.
- 19 November – Conservative Party politician Lord Young resigns as the coalition government's enterprise adviser after claiming that most Britons "have never had it so good" in spite of the recession.
- 24 November – A second protest in London sees thousands of students demonstrate. Trouble flares in Whitehall, resulting in 17 people being injured and 32 people are arrested. Unrest also spreads into cities including Brighton, Manchester, Oxford, Cambridge and Sheffield, with street protests and university building sit-in protests taking place.
- 25 November – The Government unveils an £8bn investment package for Britain's railways.

=== December ===
- 1 December – Heavy snow and freezing temperatures now affect most of the country, with road, rail and air services disrupted and thousands of schools shut. Gatwick Airport is closed.
- 2 December – England's bid to host the 2018 FIFA World Cup fails having attracted only two votes; FIFA awards the tournament to Russia instead.
- 3 December – The Royal Navy aircraft carrier HMS Ark Royal returns to Portsmouth for the last time before being decommissioned. The amphibious warfare ship HMS Albion is announced as her successor as the Royal Navy's flagship.
- 5 December – Universities minister David Willetts announces that English university students from low income families could have their tuition fees paid for up to two years.
- 9 December –
  - A second wave of protests in London by university students protesting against increased tuition fees and reduced public spending on higher education takes place in Whitehall, London. A Cenotaph war memorial and statue of Winston Churchill are vandalised, and a car transporting the Prince of Wales and the Duchess of Cornwall (Charles and Camilla) is attacked.
  - The coalition government wins a vote in the House of Commons to raise the cap on university tuition fees to £9,000 with a majority of 21.
- 13 December –
  - Mark Weston, the first person to face a second murder trial in the United Kingdom following the abolition of the double jeopardy rule in England and Wales, is convicted of killing a woman in Oxfordshire in 1995. He is sentenced to life imprisonment with a recommended minimum term of 13 years.
  - Communities Secretary Eric Pickles announces a 9.9% reduction in core funding for English local councils in the 2011/12 tax year, with a 7.3% reduction to follow for the 2012/13 tax year.
- 24 December – A woman in her 40s dies after being attacked by a dog in south London.
- 26 December – Avon and Somerset Police say they are "satisfied" that a body found on Christmas Day near the village of Failand, Somerset is that of missing Bristol woman Joanna Yeates, who disappeared on 17 December.
- 28 December – Police launch a murder investigation after a post mortem into the death of Joanna Yeates concludes that she had been strangled.

== Deaths ==
- 15 October – Malcolm Allison, football player and manager (b. 1927)

== See also ==
- 2010 in Northern Ireland
- 2010 in Scotland
- 2010 in Wales
