= Ryan Day (disambiguation) =

Ryan Day (born 1979) is the head football coach at Ohio State University.

Ryan Day may also refer to:

- Ryan Day (snooker player) (born 1980), Welsh professional snooker player
- Ryan Day, a past member of Attack! Attack! (Welsh band)
