= FAW Elite Futsal League =

- Founded: 2010
- Country: Wales
- Level on pyramid: 1
- Domestic cup: FAW Futsal Cup
- International cup: UEFA Futsal Cup 2001 - 2018 UEFA Futsal Champions League 2018 to date

The FAW Elite Futsal League is a futsal league featuring teams based in Wales. It was initially planned that the league would develop into a full national league.

In 2011, The New Saints won the inaugural FAW Futsal Cup.

== Winners ==
- 2010-2011 - The New Saints Futsal Club
- 2011-2012 - Cardiff University Futsal Club
- 2012-2013 - Wrexham Futsal Club
- 2013-2014 - Cardiff University Futsal Club
- 2014-2015 - Wrexham Futsal Club
- 2015-2016 - Cardiff University Futsal Club
- 2016-2017 - Wrexham Futsal Club
- 2017-2018 - Cardiff University Futsal Club
- 2018-2019 - Cardiff University Futsal Club
- 2019-2020 - Swansea University Futsal Club
- 2020-2021 - Cefn Druids Futsal Club
- 2021-2022 - Futsal Club Cardiff
- 2022-2023 - Cefn Druids Futsal Club
- 2023-2024 - Pro Futsal Cymru
- 2024-2025 - Futsal Club Cardiff
- 2025-2026 - Futsal Club Cardiff

2019/20 Season decided on average points basis due to COVID-19 lockdown

== See also ==
- FAW Futsal Cup
