= Phil Campbell and the Bastard Sons =

Welsh heavy metal band

Phil Campbell's Bastard Sons
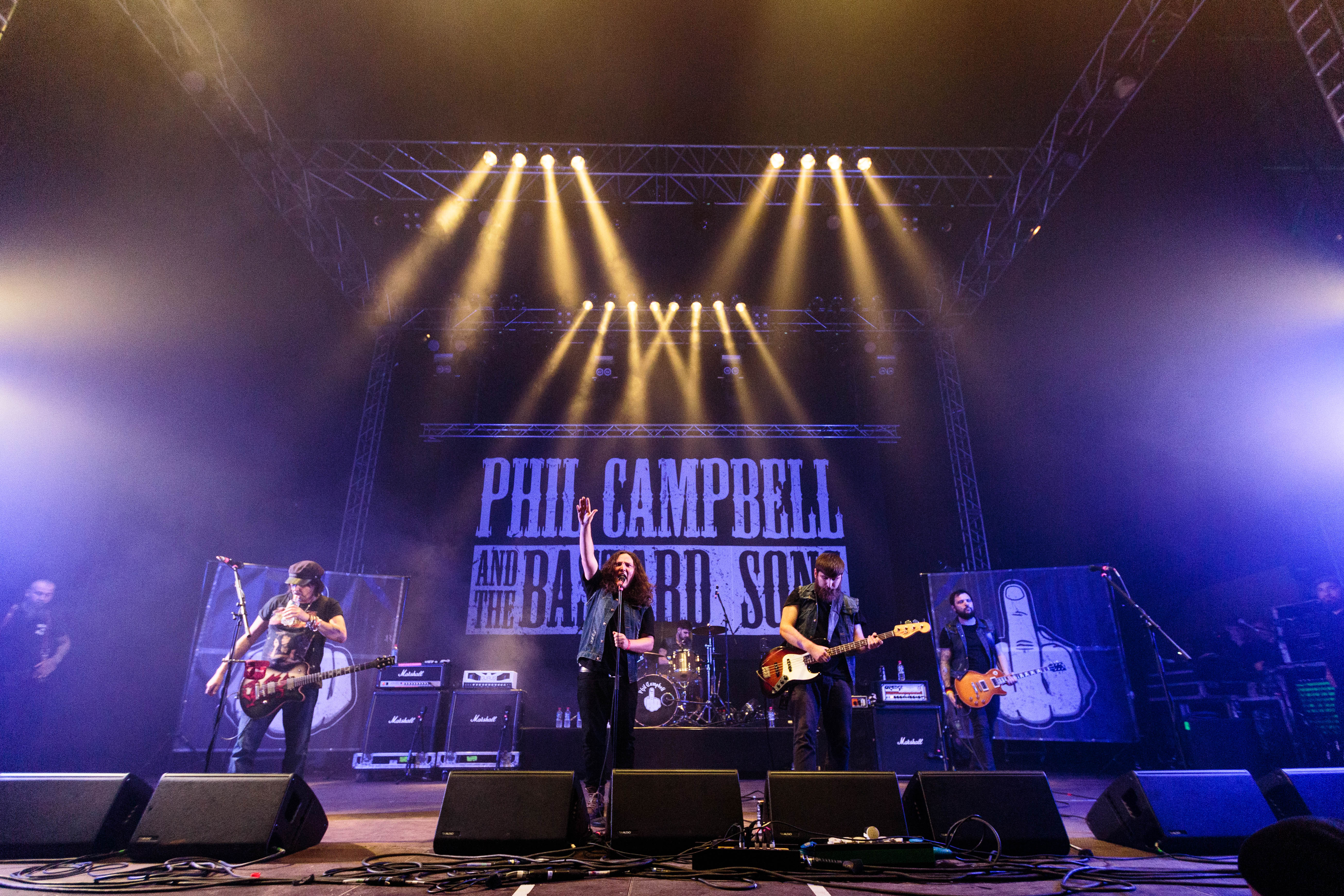
- The band at Wacken Open Air 2016

Background information
- Also known as: Phil Campbell and the Bastard Sons (2016–2026)
- Origin: Pontypridd, Wales
- Genres: Heavy metal; hard rock
- Years active: 2016–present
- Label: Nuclear Blast
- Spinoff of: Motörhead
- Members: Todd Campbell; Dane Campbell; Tyla Campbell; Julian Jenkins
- Past members: Neil Starr; Joel Peters; Phil Campbell

Phil Campbell's Bastard Sons (formerly known as Phil Campbell and the Bastard Sons) are a Welsh rock band established in 2016 by longtime Motörhead guitarist Phil Campbell, following the 2015 death of Motörhead frontman Lemmy. Following the death of Phil Campbell in 2026, the remaining members reformed under the name Phil Campbell’s Bastard Sons.

== History ==
=== Debut EP (2016) ===
In November 2016, his new project Phil Campbell and the Bastard Sons released their first recording, a self-titled EP. The band has subsequently performed in supporting slots with Hawkwind, Guns N' Roses, Saxon, and Airbourne.

=== Debut album (2017) ===
In August 2017, Phil Campbell and the Bastard Sons announced that they were to start recording their debut album. On 26 October 2017, Phil Campbell and the Bastard Sons announced the title of the debut album as The Age of Absurdity, which was released on 26 January 2018 on Nuclear Blast Records. The album was produced by Romesh Dodangoda. At the 2018 Metal Hammer Awards ceremony in Germany, it won Best Debut Album.

The band's line up for the album features Phil and his three sons, together with former Attack! Attack! vocalist from South Wales Neil Starr:

- Phil Campbell – guitar
- Todd Campbell – guitar, harmonica
- Dane Campbell – drums
- Tyla Campbell – bass
- Neil Starr (Attack! Attack!, Dopamine) – vocals
- Romesh Dodangoda – percussion and keyboards on "Into the Dark"
- Dave Brock – guitar and vocals on "Silver Machine"

=== Debut single (2018) ===
On 21 April 2018, Phil Campbell and the Bastard Sons released a cover of "Silver Machine" for Record Store Day. The track was previously available as a bonus track on some CD versions of The Age of Absurdity. The band completed a headlining tour of the UK and Europe in the winter of 2018.

=== We're the Bastards ===
On 4 September 2020, the band announced on social media that a new album We're the Bastards would be released on 13 November via Nuclear Blast. The album was recorded in 2020 and produced by Todd Campbell in Wales and mixed by Soren Anderson. Vocalist Neil Starr said: "It's definitely great to know that we have an audience now. We know there are people that want to hear it, but the truth is that we just had fun with it. Once again, we made the record we wanted to make and it's been really exciting. It was awesome to take our minds off everything and just concentrate on recording a kick ass album for the fans to enjoy."

On 2 June 2021, the band announced they had parted ways with vocalist Neil Starr.

On 18 January 2022, the band announced that Joel Peters had been made a permanent member of the band.

On 11 September 2025, the band announced that Joel Peters was no longer a part of the band.

=== Death of Phil Campbell and future of the band ===
Phil Campbell died on 13 March 2026. Campbell's sons, the remaining members of the band, reformed shortly after his death under the name Phil Campbell's Bastard Sons. They will play a tribute show at Chepstow Castle alongside Chris Holmes, Tygers of Pan Tang, and other special guests and support acts. They will begin touring officially in September 2026 with a show in Coventry and dates in Europe supporting Judas Priest. In April 2026, Julian Jenkins of Fury was announced as the band's new lead singer.

Ahead of Campbells death, the band were scheduled to Headline the first day of Takedown Festival 2026, though this was canceled ahead of time due to his medical issues, with the band being replaced with Therapy?. Following the announcement of his passing, the festival announced the Kerrang! stage, which The Bastard sons where set to play, would be renamed the Phil Campbell stage for the first day of the festival. In addition to this, a memorial wall was put up so fans could leave tributes and a 'minute of noise' was held for him on the Phil Campbell stage.

== Band members ==
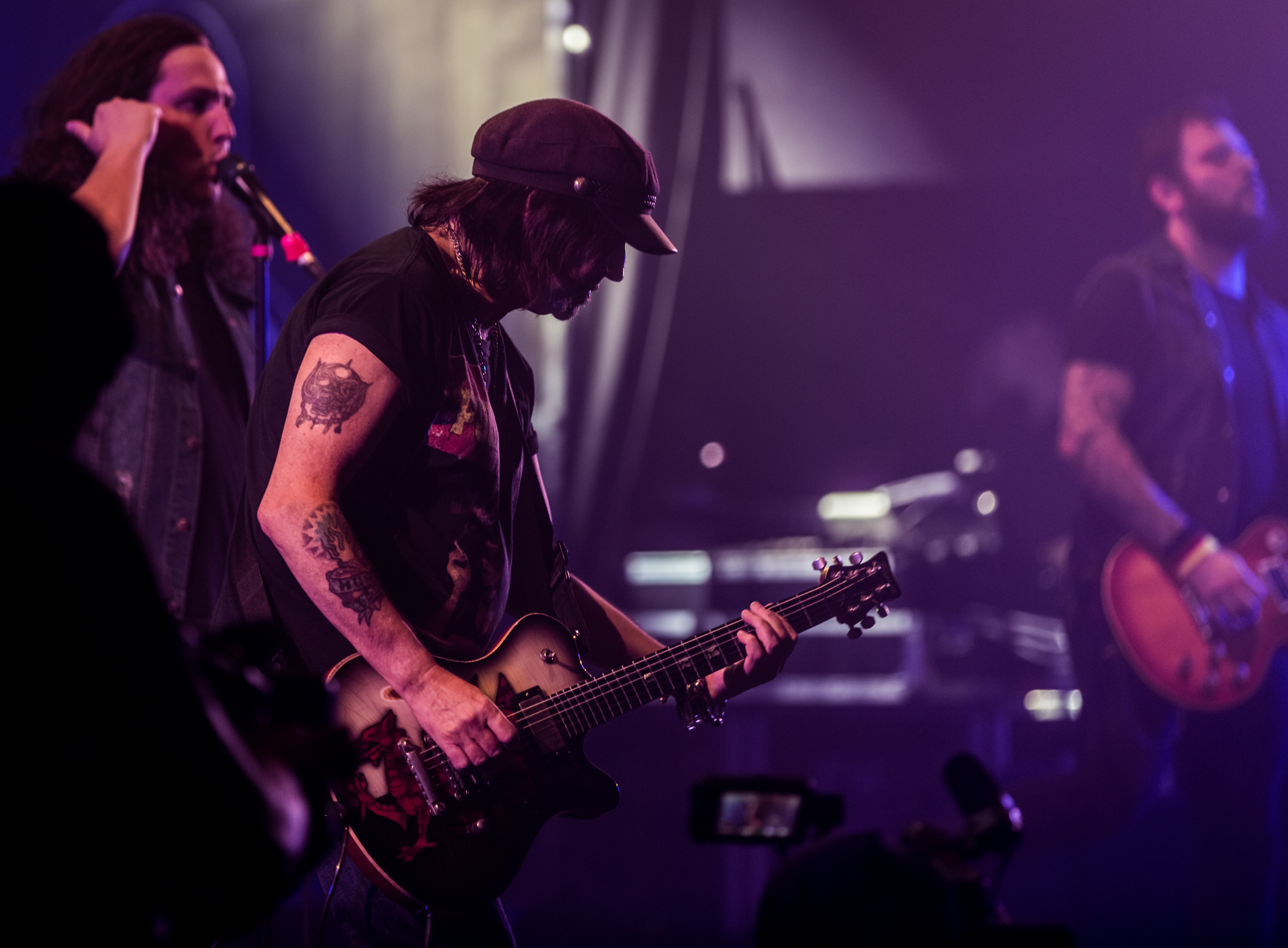
The band at Wacken Open Air 2016

Current line-up

- Todd Campbell – guitar, harmonica (2016–present)
- Tyla Campbell – bass (2016–present)
- Dane Campbell – drums (2016–present)
- Julian Jenkins – lead vocals (2026–present)

Former members

- Phil Campbell – guitar (2016–2026; his death)
- Neil Starr – lead vocals (2016–2021)
- Joel Peters – lead vocals (2021–2025)

== Discography ==
- Phil Campbell and the Bastard Sons (EP) (2016)
- Live at Solothurn (EP) (2017)
- The Age of Absurdity (2018)
- We're the Bastards (2020)
- Live in the North (2023)
- Kings of the Asylum (2023)
