= Y Byd ar Bedwar =

- Y Byd ar Bedwar title card
- Genre: Current affairs
- Country of origin: United Kingdom
- Original languages: Welsh (with English subtitles)

Production
- Producer: Bethan Muxworthy
- Editor: Branwen Thomas
- Camera setup: Single-camera
- Running time: 24 minutes
- Production company: ITV Cymru Wales

Original release
- Network: S4C
- Release: November 1982 – present

Y Byd ar Bedwar (Welsh for The World on Four) is a Welsh-language current affairs television programme, which has broadcast on S4C since the channel was launched in November 1982. It is produced by ITV Cymru Wales.

The programme's reporters have brought stories from the four corners of the world to Welsh screens. In the 1980s, long-serving reporter Tweli Griffiths secured the first interview with Libyan dictator Colonel Gaddafi. Reports also covered the fall of the Berlin Wall, the Chernobyl disaster and the Persian Gulf war. The programme is also famed for securing high-profile exclusive interviews in Wales, such as with Sion Aubrey Roberts, the only person to be jailed over the Meibion Glyndwr arson campaign and Ryan James, a vet from Ammanford who had been wrongly jailed after being accused of murdering his wife.

More recently, a series of undercover investigations into west Wales puppy farms have led to several pressure groups to call for a change in legislation by the Welsh Government to protect animals. Senior producer Eifion Glyn travelled undercover to Zimbabwe in 2008 to show the horrors of life there under Robert Mugabe's rule and also journeyed to Afghanistan for the second time in 2013 to produce a series of programmes documenting the lives of Welsh troops fighting the Taliban.

At home, a raw portrayal of the lives of two heroin addicts in Cardiff won the Best Current Affairs Award at the 2009 Celtic Media Festival. In 2013, another expose of the heroin scene, this time on the island of Anglesey, won the BAFTA Cymru award for current affairs. The team also secured a moving exclusive interview with the grandparents of April Jones after the young girl's disappearance in 2012. Success at the BAFTA Cymru awards followed in 2014 with a moving response to Typhoon Haiyan and in 2015 with an emotional portrayal of the lack of provision for young people battling mental health issues in Wales.

== People ==
Editor
Branwen Thomas

=== Notable former staff ===
- Lowri Gwilym
- Betsan Powys
- Menna Richards
