= John Rhys Evans =

Welsh singer (1930–2010)

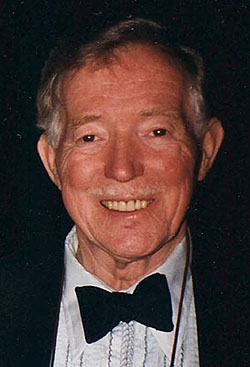

John Rhys Evans (5 September 1930 – 2 January 2010) was a Welsh baritone noted for operatic roles including the leading man in the Merry Widow, the King in The Vagabond King, Count Almaviva in The Marriage of Figaro; Don Carlos in Ernani, and leading roles in L'elisir d'amore, Madame Butterfly, I Pagliacci, La Boheme, The Gypsy Baron, Carmen, Die Fledermaus and Don Giovanni. He sang more than 40 different roles in the course of his career, which lasted from his first public appearance in 1953 to 1994. He sang as a soloist at the Investiture of the Prince of Wales at Caernarvon Castle in 1969.

He was the half-brother of the opera singer Sir Geraint Evans.

== Early life ==
John Rhys Evans was born into a very artistic and musical family in Hopkinstown, Pontypridd, South Wales. His family was Welsh-speaking and Evans learned Welsh before he learned English. He was the son of William John Evans, a coal miner, who became one of Cilfynydd's best musicians at the time and the conductor of Côr Meibion Pontypridd. His mother, Sarah Anne, a church organist, was William's second wife; his first marriage had produced an older son, Geraint Evans, who became a world-famous opera singer. Geraint noted in his autobiography that Sarah had a heart condition and found it difficult to cope with her children, so that Geraint often looked after John and his sisters.

John was educated at Hopkinstown Junior School, Cilfynydd School and later at Pontypridd Grammar School. His family moved to Cilfynydd in 1941. After grammar school (1941-1948), he enrolled in the Royal Army Service Corps (1949–1950), but was medically discharged with rheumatic fever. He took a job as a costing clerk at the Aero Zip Fastener Company in Wales (1950–1952), where he was responsible for weekly wage analysis for seven hundred employees.

Evans had planned to become a rugby player, but decided to take singing lessons to placate his parents, as they insisted and encouraged him to sing, his father saw the potential in his voice. He studied at the Royal Academy of Music and Drama in London (1952–1954); Guildhall School of Music, London (1954–1958) and the Ludwig-Maximilians-Universität München (LMU), Music Department, Germany (1958–1959).

== Career roles ==
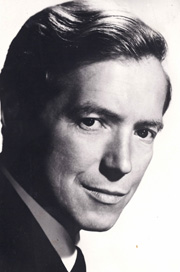

Evans decided to become a professional singer at the age of 27. After studying at the Guildhall School of Music, he launched his singing career with an engagement at the Old Vic in the operas Murder in the Cathedral and Henry VIII. This was followed by Billy Budd at Covent Garden and other leading roles in operatic companies, among them the Welsh National Opera.

He made his début as a concert artiste in Wales at the Regent Ballroom Hopkinstown in October 1962. In his first solo, the prologue from Leoncavallo's I Pagliacci, he showed a richness of tone and an impressive powerful voice, which lasted throughout his career. The choir, at the time, was under the direction of his father, William J. Evans.

His first appearance in Cardiff (April 1963), was at the annual Good Friday performance of Handel's Messiah, at the Roath Park Presbyterian Church, which led him to a contract with the Glyndebourne Festival Opera.

At Glyndebourne he was recognized having a rich, resonant voice to which a keen dramatic style was added. His items were very well received, particularly Non Piu Andrai from Mozart's The Marriage of Figaro and Credo from Verdi's Otello. His several encores included the spiritual Were you there when they crucified my Lord? which was most feelingly sung in Welsh. He was a permanent guest artiste at the Glyndebourne Festival for over two years, appearing in Il barbiere di Siviglia, Fidelio, Don Giovanni, L'Elisir de Amore, among others. He featured in a 1961 recorded Glyndebourne production of The Marriage of Figaro.

Evans appeared in the premieres of several operas including two operas by British composers which were staged for the first time in the U.K. at Sadlers Wells: The Wager by Buxton Orr (1962) and The Departure by Elizabeth Maconchy (1963). A reviewer said that his singing performance with Derby Choral Union in the Messiah gave a most admirable interpretation and that he "sang most nobly stressing a fine bass and control". (1964)

From 1964 to 1969, he was the leading man in London's West End in The Merry Widow, as Danilo, a "down-to-earth unromantic figure", opposite Elizabeth Webb. It was with this operetta that Evans gained his reputation as having an impressive natural voice quality with dramatic sensibility, which he went on to sing more than two hundred times.

He participated as a soloist in several concerts and festivals, including Hiawatha (led by Ronald Good) in The Lewisham Concert Hall; Glyndebourne Festival where he sang Verdi's Eri Tu and a Welsh song Cân Yr Arad Goch by Idris Lewis; he also appeared as a soloist at Cardigan Festival with an impressive performance of Leoncavallo's I Pagliacci.

He left London to sing at the major opera houses of Europe for many years. In 1968, he ended a season in Austria during which time he sang over twenty operettas and five operas – in German. He also performed and spent some time on stage in France.

While in France, he suffered a heart attack, which led him to recover in hospital for five months. On his return to the U.K., he starred in a production of Die Fledermaus and gave a performance in Sheffield, but collapsed again, and it was then that the doctors advised him to give up singing professionally.

After Evans returned to London he took a job in the social services. Then came the meeting with his wife, who was from Mexico City, and the beginning of the road to his come-back. He moved to Mexico City in 1973, where he joined the local church choir and was heard by a representative from the Palace of Fine Arts, who was busy preparing for the coming opera season. He was asked to audition and was accepted by Gregory Millarkos, who had been brought from the United States as a director. Evans joined the new company which was being formed, but plans for it fell through.

On 8 February 1974, he performed at a Concert in Mexico City with tenor Ray Fitzimmons, Margaret McFee Navarro and pianist Erika Kubacsek. Critic comments were of a "voice with exceptional quality, warm rich in overtones with that dark rolling sound in the lower register suggestive of the Slavic bass". While living in Mexico and being part of the National Opera Company, he was offered and sang the principal baritone role in Madame Butterfly at the Palace of Fine Arts with singers from the Metropolitan Opera and New York City Opera.

After living three years in Mexico City, Evans moved to Washington D.C. where he continued his singing career, but opted for lesser roles with the Washington Opera at the Kennedy Center Opera House (1988–1994) and the Wolf Trap Opera (Barber of Seville). He was active singing in the British Embassy Players and the St. David's Welsh American Society. He also conducted many singing festivals in Washington D.C. and Baltimore.

== Recordings ==
John Rhys Evans recorded the role of the Police Officer on an EMI recording of The Barber of Serville with Victoria de los Angeles, Luigi Alva and Sesto Bonscantini. He also recorded T.S. Eliot’s Murder in the Cathedral with British actor Robert Donat. The recording is now in the Library of Congress.

Evans sang different operas at Glyndebourne in 1961, featuring Don Pizarro in Fidelio and Don Giovanni. The production was broadcast by BBC television on 24 August 1961 and Act II was transmitted on BBC radio on 6 August 1961.

He also recorded Il Barbiere di Siviglia (Rossini) with Vittorio Gui and Victoria de los Angeles.

He also performed many recitals, concerts, appeared on television and the radio. His professional experience extended to voice over (dubbing) for films, opera and oratorios.

== Reputation – critics ==
During a career that lasted from 1953 to 1994, Evans played more than forty roles. His debut as a concert artiste in Wales was received warmly by the audience and in his first solo, the prologue from Leoncavallo’s Ill Pagliacci he showed a richness of tone and impressive power. His diction and clarity of tone were excellent. His reputation rose quickly as a baritone who had an impressive natural vocal quality and glorious voice.

At Glyndebourne Festival, Evans chose Verdi’s dramatic: Eri Tu as his first piece – the first non-Welsh item of the evening, but exhibited his national pride in Cân Yr Arad Goch – "His powerful voice coped magnificently with the pieces’ challenges" – His appearances at Glyndebourne included the officer in Il Barbiere di Siviglia, Don Pizarro in Fidelio and Don Giovanni in Don Giovanni. The Count in Le Nozze di Figaro, and Belcore – L’elisir d’amore; and the Count – Le nozze di Figaro, He was offered Pizarro but turned it down.

Writing of his performance in The Merry Widow, a critic wrote: "Evans Welsh Baritone has a rich, resonant voice to which is added a keen dramatic style." Other critics wrote: "Evans, with glorious voice and classic profile, looks capable of sweeping every woman in town off her feet. He is a dashing Danilo, brimful of charm and handsome looks"; "Evans, the Danilo, is a down-to-earth unromantic figure, but he has an agreeable assurance and a strong baritone voice of unusual but pleasantly resonant timbre"; "He has an impressive natural vocal quality."

"It is a voice of exceptional quality, warm, rich in overtones with that dark rolling sound in the lower register suggestive of the Slavic bass. Yet he can whittle the top into as pointed and ringing a tone as to practically put it into the tenor category."

== Festivals ==
During his professional career, John Rhys Evans participated in many operatic festivals: the Cestrian Male Voice Choir’s 32nd Festival at the Central Hall, the Annual Celebrity Concert in Pontypridd; the Philopera Circle at St. Pancras Town Hall Festival, sang Ernani (Verdi);, Bolton Choral Union at Victoria Hall where he sang in the Messiah; Wexford Festival, the Welsh Municipal Concert; Hiawatha at the Bromley Philharmonic Choir in Lewisham Concert Hall where he was one of four soloists performing. At Glyndebourne Festival, the most outstanding example was Verdi’s Otello, from which he performed Iago’s Credo, sung in English. He performed at the Welsh Municipal Concert where he sang Eri Tu (Verdi) the first non-Welsh piece of the evening and Cân Yr Arad Goch (sung in Welsh).

== Reputation and retirement ==
Evans was invited to sing as a soloist at the Investiture of the Prince of Wales at Caernarvon Castle in 1969. After the ceremony he was invited by the Prince to a private reception on board the Royal Yacht Britannia.

After he moved to Mexico City and Washington, D.C., he continued to sing in lesser roles as he had to relinquish his demanding career of an international opera singer due to illness. While in Mexico City, the University Club presented A Night of the Great Opera Arias where he sang Dite Alla Giovine from La traviata. Three years later, in Washington, D.C., he auditioned for lesser parts at the Washington Opera, where he sang for many years. He also sang at the Wolf Trap Opera and became a participant member of the British Players, a theatrical group based near Washington. He died on 2 January 2010 at his home in Virginia, USA.
