= Harrow Court fire =

Tower block fire in Hertfordshire, England

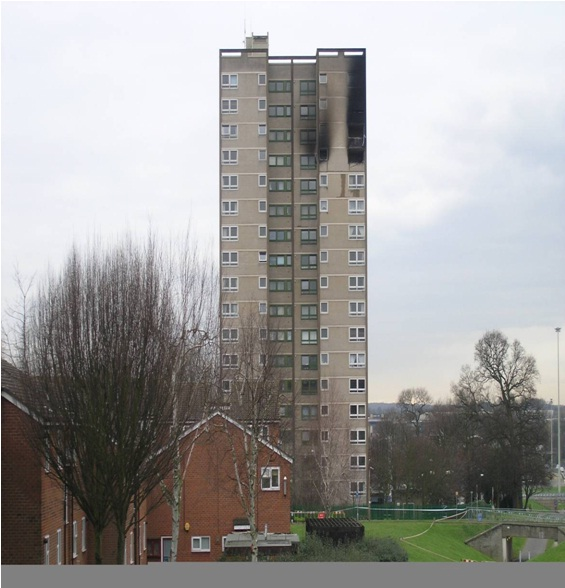
- The East face of the building, seen from Fairlands Way shortly after the fire
- Date: 2 February 2005; 20 years ago
- Time: 03:00 GMT (emergency services received first call)
- Location: Harrow Court, Silam Road, Stevenage, Hertfordshire, England; 51.904955°N 0.197608°W
- Cause: Abnormal Rapid Fire Development caused by accidental ignition
- Deaths: 3
- Injuries: 7

The Harrow Court fire occurred in a tower block on 2 February 2005 in Stevenage, Hertfordshire, England. Three people were killed, two of them firefighters, when a fire developed and spread from the 14th floor. An investigation of the fire found that there was an Abnormal Rapid Fire Development, caused by a candle melting the surface of a television, which then spread rapidly up the outside of the building to subsequent floors.

In honour of the two firefighters who lost their lives, Jeff Wornham (aged 28) and Michael Miller (aged 26), Stevenage Borough Council named two adjoining roads in a new nearby development "Miller Way" and "Wornham Avenue", in 2006 and 2007 respectively.

The fire at Harrow Court featured in the BBC Two documentary broadcast 30 October 2018 The Fires that Foretold Grenfell, as one of five significant fires in the UK which occurred prior to the Grenfell Tower fire, which called for changes to regulations and policies.

== Background ==
Harrow Court is a 17-storey concrete tower block located in the Bedwell area of Stevenage, close to the town centre. The building dates from the mid-1960s. It consists of six flats on each floor - four with two bedrooms and two with one.

== Fire ==
Harrow Court
- Interactive map of the Harrow Court area

General information
- Location: Stevenage, United Kingdom
- Construction started: 1966
- Estimated completion: 1967
- Owner: Stevenage Borough Council
- Landlord: Stevenage Borough Council

Height
- Height: 51.80 metres (169 ft 11 in)

Technical details
- Floor count: 17

Design and construction
- Main contractor: Gilbert Ash

In the early hours of 2 February 2005, a lit tealight candle melted through the television on which it was sitting. One of the two occupants, who were asleep at the time, woke up and attempted to put the fire out. The other occupant of the flat, Natalie Close, remained asleep and died in the bed. Two of the firefighters who attended from the nearby fire station were killed.

A resident on the 15th floor, the floor above the origin of the fire, told reporters that firefighters had told them to "stay put" but they chose to escape: "A fireman told us to stay in the flat. We went back inside but no one came to us. We got out after an hour. It was sheer panic. It was smoky, we could not see anything, and the stairs were slippery. We are lucky to be alive." Seven people were treated in hospital with burns and smoke inhalation; one was in a critical condition.

Both firefighters died after going in to tackle the blaze without water because the dry riser had been padlocked shut against vandals, and the smoke alarms were not working.

== Investigations ==
An investigation into the fire found that there was no dry riser outlet on the 14th floor of the building as they were only located on alternate floors. The firefighters connected to the dry riser on the 13th floor, but then to fight the location of the fire, the hose had to pass through fire doors, which were then kept open. This caused the fire to have more oxygen due to the fact that compartmentation was not achieved. The two firefighters died when they got tangled in cable trays which were attached to the ceiling with plastic hooks which melted.

The melting of plastic hooks was also listed as the cause for the death of two other firefighters in the Shirley Towers fire in Southampton five years later. It was after these subsequent deaths that changes to Building Regulations was imposed, namely to BS 7671, which covers electrical installations in the UK, and apply to the use of fire resistant mechanical fixings to cables in escape routes fixed to walls and ceilings, which came into force in July 2015. The regulation was not a retrospective one, meaning that it will only be enforceable on all new builds and not refurbishments.

== Recent events ==
Although not a legal requirement, on 21 September 2018, Stevenage Borough Council announced plans to retrofit sprinklers in all seven high-rise tower blocks in the town. Jeanette Thomas, the council's executive member for housing, stated: "We decided we want to put some sprinklers in because the wellbeing of our tenants is fundemental [sic] especially after the fire at Harrow Court."

On the morning of 1 October 2018, another fatal tower block fire also occurred in Stevenage. The Towers is a 12-storey concrete tower block owned by Stevenage Borough Council primarily for social housing and is located in the town centre. On 16 October 2018, a male resident who lived in the fifth floor flat where the fire started was confirmed to have died.

== See also ==
- Building regulations in the United Kingdom § Part B. Fire safety
- Fire escape
- Lakanal House Fire
- Shirley Towers fire
- Grenfell Tower fire
- Ronan Point
- Skyscraper fire
- Structural robustness
