= FAW Futsal Cup =

National Futsal competition

The FAW Futsal Cup is a national competition organised by the Football Association of Wales in the game of futsal.

In 2011, The New Saints won a major futsal competition and as a representative of Wales for the first time advanced to the UEFA Futsal Cup.

== Winners ==
- 2011 - The New Saints Futsal Club
- 2012 - Cardiff University Futsal Club
- 2013 - Wrexham Futsal Club
- 2014 - Wrexham Futsal Club
- 2015 - Cardiff University Futsal Club
- 2016 - Cardiff University Futsal Club
- 2017 - Wrexham Futsal Club
- 2018 - Cardiff University Futsal Club
- 2023 - Cardiff University Futsal Club

== See also ==
- FAW Elite Futsal League
