= Derby Choral Union =

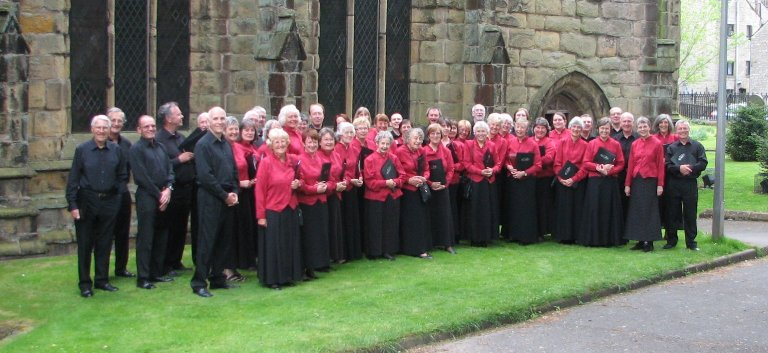
- Group photo of the Derby Choral Union before the concert in Tideswell Church on 5 June 2010
- Formation: 1866; 160 years ago
- Type: Choral society
- Location: Derby, England
- Website: www.dcu.org.uk

Derby Choral Union is one of the UK’s longest standing choral societies having been formed in 1866. The choir was established to perform choral music of the highest quality, a tradition it strives to maintain to this day. The repertoire includes traditional choral works as well as music by 20th-century and more contemporary composers. Derby Choral Union is a registered charity and an independent choral society. It promotes concerts in Derby, England, and the surrounding district, and has over 100 active members.

The choir's Patron since 1993 is the internationally known soprano Dame Emma Kirkby; she was given the Award of the Queen's Medal for Music The Queen's Medal for Music in June 2011 – only the sixth person to have received this award. Former patrons have included Sir Charles Groves. Richard Dacey has been the Musical Director since 2003; previous musical directors have included Sir John Pritchard, Sir Henry Coward, Harold Gray and Raymond Thorpe. The choir performs mainly in Derby Cathedral and in recent years has also performed in Leicester (with the Leicester Philharmonic Choir) and at Merton College, Oxford as well as overseas.

The choir performs with professional soloists and orchestras and mixes new music with its extensive repertoire of traditional works. The Choir commissioned a new work from Will Todd ("Song of Creation", 2000) to celebrate the Millennium. To maintain standards at the highest level, all new singers are auditioned; to encourage younger members, choral scholarships are offered for singers aged 25 years or younger.

Reviews of most concerts are published in the music section of the Derby Telegraph, some of which can be seen on the choir's website.

== Early years ==
In 18th-century England, Derby was no more than a reasonably-prosperous market town with a few pioneer industries established. The new idea of public concerts was first recorded on 3 September 1788 with a programme consisting mainly of music by Handel. It seems probable that the choir formed for this event remained in existence until the next known public concert held on 5 September 1793.

But by the 1860s, the face of Derby was changing rapidly with the Midland Railway and other industries bringing prosperity to the town. In 1866, the New Market Hall – as a new artistic venture – was completed and officially opened on Tuesday 29 May 1866. The official ceremony took place in the morning and was followed by a performance of Handel's Messiah. The orchestra consisted of players from Nottingham, Birmingham, Leicester and Burton, as well as from Derby and district; the choir too was drawn from far afield but a local group also took part. At the performance, the combined strength of the choir and orchestra was 500.

The local singers were "fired by their success" (according to page 4 of), and suggested the founding of a regular choral society. A meeting was held, at the invitation of the then mayor, on 22 June 1866. This preliminary meeting decided to start the Derby Choral Union. A second meeting was called a week later, "for the purpose of receiving the names and entrance fees of any Vocalists who may wish to enrol themselves as Members of the [Derby Choral] Union".

The first rehearsal of the new society was held on 21 September 1866, with an arrangement to hold weekly practices in the Old Assembly Rooms, Full Street. By this time the society had about 120 members. The Derby Mercury, dated 26 September 1866, recorded that: "We trust that the gentlemen of the Town will come forward liberally with subscriptions in aid of the society’s funds; for, although the Choral Union is to a certain extent self-supporting, it must be borne in mind that unless a goodly number of honorary members are enrolled the committee will not be justified in incurring the heavy expenses inevitable on a Grand Oratorio performance."

On 1 February 1867, the choir gave an "open rehearsal" of Handel's oratorio Judas Maccabaeus at the Corn Exchange. A second "open rehearsal", this time of Haydn's Creation, was given on 3 May 1867 to round off the first season's activities. In the interim, the choir had recruited many more members and the orchestra included, in addition to local players, "several members of Mr. Charles Halle's celebrated band". A total of 230 singers and players took part.

The Derby Mercury of 8 May 1867 recorded this as an "unqualified triumph". After remarking that Derby could no longer be called an "unmusical town", it goes on: "not only was the largest hall in the town (the Corn Exchange) crowded to excess but we are informed that scores were turned away from the doors for whom the managers were unable to find room."

Within a few years some of the novelty of the Choral Union had worn off. Less than capacity audiences were reported and the reviews in the press became more critical: a good sign that for the first time musical standards were being used to judge performances.

== The 20th century ==
Derby Choral Union became an established society, with regular performances of the classical oratorios. It has an unbroken record, and shares with very few other major choirs the distinction of having continued to give at least two concerts every season, even throughout the Second World War (as documented in both the choir's repertoire listings and on page 7 of). In 1942–43 this rose to five performances, and altogether seventeen concerts were staged during the period of the war.

The future of Derby Choral Union was cemented from 1960 to the present day by aiming to achieve high standards of choral singing; thus the quality of its musical directors appointed over this period was crucial. Two notable celebrations occurred during this time: the choir's centenary in 1965–66, when Bach's Mass in B Minor, Elgar's Dream of Gerontius and Vaughan Williams' A Sea Symphony were performed during this auspicious season. Then in 1990–91, the 125th season, the following works were performed: Verdi's Requiem, Handel's Messiah and Elgar's Dream of Gerontius.

In both seasons, the performances were conducted by Raymond Thorpe, the longest-serving musical director of the Derby Choral Union. He served from 1963 till his death in 1991.

Notable concerts and appearances with the Derby Choral Union during the 20th century include:

- Vaughan Williams conducting his Sea Symphony on 7 April 1926.
- Isobel Baillie singing in Mendelssohn's Elijah on 3 December 1930.
- Derby Choral Union making its first broadcast on the "wireless" in 1936.
- In 1936, a joint concert with the Birmingham Festival Choral Society in the Birmingham Town Hall, singing Elgar's Dream of Gerontius.
- Isobel Baillie and Peter Pears singing in Haydn's Creation on 18 November 1944.
- Kathleen Ferrier singing in Bach's St. Matthew Passion in 1947.
- Sir Adrian Boult conducting a performance of Elgar's Dream of Gerontius in Southwell Minster in 1966.

== The choir today ==
The "home" of the Derby Choral Union is Derby Cathedral where three concerts are usually performed each season. The current musical director is Richard Dacey who is a graduate of the Royal School of Music, Fellow of the Royal College of Organists, Licentiate of the Royal Academy of Music and Associate of the Royal College of Music – as well as holding a Music Teachers' Certificate.

The repertoire draws on traditional choral works by Handel, Mozart, Haydn, Bach and Dvořák as well as music by 20th-century and more contemporary composers such as Edward Elgar, William Walton, John Rutter, Karl Jenkins and Will Todd. A recent innovation was a "Jazz Choral Concert" in November 2011 at which Will Todd's Mass in Blue was performed at the Landau Forte College, Derby.

The choir has enjoyed five successful overseas tours to Italy (2004 & 2005), Germany (2008), the Czech Republic (2011) and most recently to Hungary (2013) where DCU and friends gave two concerts in Budapest, performing two challenging pieces: Poulenc's Gloria and Duruflé's Requiem.

One of the longest-serving members of the committee was Ken Spruce, who served as the Hon. Secretary of the choir from 1969 – 2000 and then as chairman from 2000 to 2009. In the early 1990s, he was appointed Chairman of the National Federation of Music Societies for the East Midlands region. In 2001 he was honoured with a Highly Commended Civic Award from the City of Derby for his outstanding work whilst he was secretary of the choir.

One of the longest-serving members of the choir, Peter Haslam, died on 19 March 2012. He was a member of the bass section for over 50 years rarely missing a rehearsal or concert. He was chairman from 1962 to 1971 and was granted Life Membership in 1990. In 1965, he published a booklet called "Derby Choral Union – The First Hundred Years" which has been an invaluable source of archival information for this article.

A succession of Musical Directors, a dedicated committee, and the ability to adapt to social changes over almost 150 years has contributed to survival of Derby Choral Union.
