= Menna Richards =

British journalist

Menna Richards OBE was the Controller of BBC Cymru Wales from February 2000 to February 2011.

== Biography ==
Born in Maesteg, Bridgend County Borough, Wales, Richards was educated at the town's Grammar School, and later at the University of Wales, Aberystwyth. Well known for her contribution to broadcasting, her career began with BBC Wales as a broadcast journalist in 1976 and later as a reporter and producer for HTV Wales in the current affairs department in 1983, including the Welsh language current affairs series, Y Byd ar Bedwar. She rose to become managing director of HTV Wales in 1997, before the company was taken over by United News & Media.

Richards rejoined BBC Wales as a Controller in February 2000 and retired in February 2011. It was revealed as part of the BBC's open policy in November 2009, that Richards salary per annum to August 2009 was £185,000, with total remuneration of £192,800. She was responsible for bringing series such as Doctor Who, Torchwood, Merlin, The Sarah Jane Adventures, Sherlock and Upstairs Downstairs to global TV screens.

She was married to the TV presenter Patrick Hannan, who died in 2009, aged 68, following a short illness.

== Honours ==
Richards was appointed Officer of the Order of the British Empire (OBE) in the 2010 New Year Honours for her services to broadcasting.

In the same year she was also appointed to the board of the Welsh National Opera. In addition, she was awarded a BAFTA in 2015 for Outstanding Contribution to Television.
