= Jenny Wood-Allen =

Scottish athlete (1911–2010)

Jenny Wood-Allen MBE
- Born: 20 November 1911; Dundee, Scotland
- Died: 30 December 2010 (aged 99)
- Occupation: Scottish marathon runner
- Known for: Record for oldest female marathon finisher

Jenny Wood-Allen MBE (20 November 1911 – 30 December 2010) was a Scottish councillor who became a marathon runner at the age of 71. She went on to run more than 50 marathons and became a Guinness World Record holder as the oldest female marathon finisher in 1999, aged 87. She was awarded an MBE in 2004 for services to charity and distance running.

== Early life ==
Wood-Allen was born Janet Soutar on 20 November 1911 in Dundee. Her parents were Margaret Kinnear and James Soutar, a chauffeur. She was one of six children and the family was not well off. She won a scholarship to Harris Academy but could not take it up as she had to leave school at 14 to work.

She took up cycling in her 20s, joining a men's cycling club. She was an unofficial Scottish women's champion time triallist as women's cycling was not a recognised sport. She was awarded honorary membership of Dundee Roadrunners.

She married Roy Wood in 1938 and they had three sons.

== Career ==
Wood-Allen was a Conservative councillor, representing the West Ferry ward for 14 years, and became a Justice of the Peace in 1966. She was a champion of women's rights and education. She was also a toastmistress.

She initially took up running as a "one-off". As a councillor, she helped organise the first Dundee marathon in 1983. She trained and ran in it, despite being advised that she was too old at the age of 71. Her finishing time was 5 hours 34 minutes. She went on to run more than 50 full marathons and raised over £70,000 for charity.

Wood-Allen made national headlines when she completed the 1999 London Marathon at 87 years old. Her time of 7 hours 14 mins 46 secs earned her the Guinness World Record for Oldest Female Marathon Finisher. This record stood until 2010 when it was broken by Gladys Burrill.

In 2001, Wood-Allen ran in the London Marathon for the last time, before walking it in 2002, aged 90.

== Awards and recognition ==
Wood-Allen received an MBE in the 2004 New Year Honours List for services to Charity and Distance Running. She was also awarded an Honorary MA from the University of Dundee in 1994.

== Later life and death ==
Wood-Allen was widowed in 1991. She continued to be very active in sport, running up to 50 miles a week, and taking part in the 2006 Great Scottish Walk. She regularly attended meetings of the Dundee City Sports Council. In December 2006, £700 worth of jewellery was stolen from her home.

Wood-Allen died on 30 December 2010, aged 99 in Dundee. Her funeral was held at the parish church of Douglas on 12 January 2011, and she was cremated at Dundee Crematorium.
