= 2009–10 in Welsh football =

== National team ==
=== Friendlies ===
14 November 2009

Wales	3–0	Scotland
D. Edwards 16'; Church; Ramsey	(report)

Cardiff City Stadium, Cardiff
Attendance: 13,844
Referee: Cyril Zimmermann (Switzerland)

3 March 2010

Wales	0–1	Sweden
	(report)	Elmander 44'

Liberty Stadium, Swansea
Attendance: 8,258
Referee: Alan Black (Northern Ireland)

23 May 2010

Croatia	2–0	Wales
Rakitić 45'; Gabrić 81'	(report)

Stadion Gradski vrt, Osijek
Attendance: 12,000
Referee: Slavko Vinčić (Slovenia)

=== FIFA World Cup 2010 Qualifiers ===
9 September 2009
19:45 UTC+1

Wales	1–3	Russia
J. Collins 53'	(report)	Semshov 36'; Ignashevich 71'; Pavlyuchenko 90+1'

Millennium Stadium, Cardiff
Attendance: 14,505
Referee: Jorge Sousa (Portugal)

10 October 2009
20:00 UTC+2

Finland	2–1	Wales
Porokara 5'; Moisander 77'	(report)	Bellamy 17'

Helsinki Olympic Stadium, Helsinki
Attendance: 14,000
Referee: Milorad Mažić (Serbia)

14 October 2009
17:00 UTC+3

Liechtenstein	0–2	Wales
	(report)	Vaughan 16'; Aaron Ramsey 80'

Rheinpark Stadion, Vaduz
Attendance: 1,858
Referee: Sten Kaldma (Estonia)

== Welsh Cup ==
Bangor City beat Port Talbot Town 3–2 at Parc y Scarlets.

== Welsh League Cup ==
The New Saints beat Rhyl 3–1 in the final of the Welsh League Cup.

== Welsh Premier League ==
- Champions: The New Saints

In line with the restructuring of the league the bottom 8 teams were relegated: Haverfordwest County were relegated to the Welsh Football League Division One whilst Bala Town, Newtown, Connah's Quay, Porthmadog, Welshpool Town, Caersws and Cefn Druids were relegated to the Cymru Alliance.

== Welsh Football League Division One ==
- Champions: to be confirmed

== Cymru Alliance League ==
- Champions: Langefni Town - Promoted to Welsh Premier League

== The Welsh Premier Women's League ==
- Champions: Swansea City Ladies - Qualified for Women's Champions League
