= The Latest Fashion =

Studio album by Attack! Attack!
- Released: 27 September 2010; 11 February 2011 (Australia)
- Genre: Alternative rock, pop punk
- Length: 36:28
- Label: Hassle

Attack! Attack! chronology
| Attack! Attack! (2008) | The Latest Fashion (2010) |

Singles from Attack! Attack!
- 1. "Not Afraid" Released: 2010; 2. "We're Not The Enemy" Released: 2010; 3. "Blood on My Hands" Released: 2011

Professional ratings
Review scores
| Source | Rating |
|---|---|
| Alt UK | link |
| Alter the Press | link |
| BBC | Favourable link |
| Change the Record | Very Positive link |
| Female First | Positive link |
| Midnight Mixtape | Favourable link |
| Total Guitar | (#207, p. 27) |
| Punktastic | link |
| Rock Sound | link |

The Latest Fashion is the second studio album from Welsh alternative rock band Attack! Attack!. The album was released on 27 September 2010 and features the singles "Not Afraid", "We're Not the Enemy" and "Blood on My Hands" . The band released the track "No Excuses" as a free download from the Hassle Records website. As of 25 September 2010, the whole album was uploaded to the band's MySpace. Attack! Attack!'s Neil Starr revealed on his Twitter that he is already making songs for the follow-up to The Latest Fashion. On 26 January it was revealed Attack! Attack! was receiving a lot of airtime in Australian radio stations, then 3 days later on 29 January, A! A! announced the album would be released in Australia on 11 February through Hassle Records.

== Track listing ==
| No. | Title | Length |
|---|---|---|
| 1. | "Everyone Knows" | 3:20 |
| 2. | "No Excuses" | 2:29 |
| 3. | "My Shoes" | 3:09 |
| 4. | "Blood on My Hands" | 3:53 |
| 5. | "Seen Me Lately" | 2:45 |
| 6. | "Latest Fashion" | 3:12 |
| 7. | "Nemesis" | 2:46 |
| 8. | "Best Mistake" | 4:07 |
| 9. | "We're Not the Enemy" | 2:57 |
| 10. | "Not Afraid" | 3:11 |
| 11. | "No Tomorrow" | 4:39 |

Attack! Attack! UK went on a World tour kicking off in The UK and going to countries such as France & Belgium. They Played a set of songs which features From the self-titled and The Latest fashion. They then announced dates early 2011 to play at venues and cities they don't normally play.

== Personnel ==
- Neil Starr – lead vocals, guitar
- Ryan Day – guitar, vocals
- Will Davies – bass
- Mike Griffiths – drums
