= Kenny Jackett =

Welsh football player and manager (1962–2026)

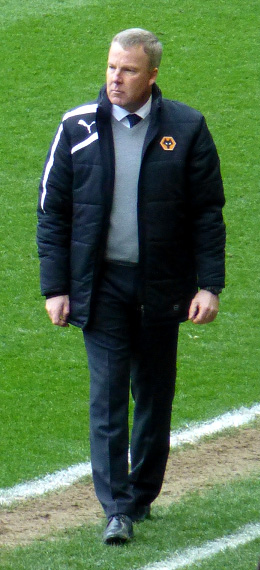
- Jackett as head coach of Wolverhampton Wanderers in 2014

Personal information
- Full name: Kenneth Francis Jackett
- Date of birth: 5 January 1962
- Place of birth: Watford, Hertfordshire, England
- Date of death: 11 June 2026 (aged 64)
- Height: 5 ft 11 in (1.80 m)
- Positions: Defender; midfielder

Youth career
- Bushey Rangers
- 1974–1980: Watford

Senior career*
Years	Team	Apps	(Gls)
1980–1990	Watford	337	(25)

International career
1982–1988	Wales	31	(0)

Managerial career
- 1996–1997: Watford
- 2004–2007: Swansea City
- 2007–2013: Millwall
- 2013–2016: Wolverhampton Wanderers
- 2016: Rotherham United
- 2017–2021: Portsmouth
- 2021–2022: Leyton Orient
- * Club domestic league appearances and goals

Kenneth Francis Jackett (5 January 1962 – 11 June 2026) was an English-born Welsh football manager and player who played for Watford.

A skilful left-footed player, able to play in defence or midfield, Jackett was capped 31 times for Wales. He spent his entire playing career at Watford, where his career was ended by injury at the age of 28. Having moved on to the club's coaching staff, he began his managerial career during the 1996–97 season.

From 2004 to 2007 he was manager of Swansea City, leading the club to promotion and several trophies. He served as Millwall manager for six seasons, again bringing a promotion, before resigning in May 2013; weeks later he took over as manager of Wolverhampton Wanderers, a position he held until July 2016, yet again garnering a promotion along the way.

Jackett was appointed Rotherham United manager in October 2016 before leaving in November. In June 2017 he took over from Paul Cook to become the Portsmouth manager. In May 2021, Jackett took over from Jobi McAnuff as manager of Leyton Orient.

== Early and personal life ==
Jackett was the son of professional footballer Frank Jackett, who played for Watford between 1949 and 1953. His son Ryan was appointed caretaker manager of Kings Langley in September 2019.

== Playing career ==
=== Club ===
Jackett joined his local club Watford at the age of 12, progressing to make his first-team debut aged 18 on 26 April 1980 as a substitute in a game at Sunderland.

He became a regular member of the Watford side that won promotion to the First Division and finished runners-up in the league in the 1982–83 season under manager Graham Taylor. In addition, he played in the club's first of only two appearances in an FA Cup Final, when they lost to Everton in 1984. These successes also led to Jackett appearing in the subsequent UEFA Cup campaign.

However, having undergone a series of knee operations, he was forced to prematurely end his playing career in 1990 aged 28. In total he made 428 appearances for the Hornets, scoring 34 goals, placing him sixth in the club's all-time appearance records.

=== International ===
Jackett made his international debut for Wales, for whom he was eligible through his Welsh-born father, on 22 September 1982 in a 1–0 win over Norway in a Euro 84 qualifier. He won 31 full caps in total, the final on 27 April 1988 in a 4–1 friendly defeat to Sweden in Stockholm.

== Managerial career ==
=== Watford ===
Upon his playing retirement, Jackett remained at Vicarage Road and, having already undertaken many qualifications, became a member of the club's coaching staff. In February 1996 he and fellow long-term Watford player Luther Blissett were selected by the returning Graham Taylor to run the first team, while he served as general manager. At the conclusion of this campaign Jackett was appointed the club's manager, with Taylor then becoming director of football.

Watford had just been relegated to the third tier and, although Jackett oversaw a long unbeaten stretch of results the team were unable to mount a serious promotion challenge, ending in 13th place – Watford's lowest position in the league structure since the 1970s. During the close season he was demoted to the position of first team coach, with Taylor once again becoming manager.

Jackett assisted Taylor in getting Watford promoted in two successive seasons, as well as being part of the coaching staff during their 1999–2000 Premier League season, which ended in relegation.

When Taylor left Watford at the end of the 2000–01 Division One season, Jackett was released on the instruction of incoming manager Gianluca Vialli. Following his exit from Watford he joined Ian Holloway at Queens Park Rangers as assistant manager and contributed towards their Division Two promotion campaign.

=== Swansea City ===
After three years as an assistant, Jackett left QPR to replace Brian Flynn as manager of Third Division side Swansea City in April 2004. In his first full season in charge, the team were promoted from League Two, finishing in third place, and also lifted the FAW Premier Cup in their last game at the Vetch Field. As a result of these successes he received a two-year contract extension.

A fine start to the League One season followed, putting the team top of the table on New Years Day 2006. However, their form faltered in the second half of the campaign meaning they finished in sixth place, entering the play-offs. The team reached the final and a potential return to the second tier after a 22-year absence but lost on penalties against Barnsley. Jackett did however win silverware for a second consecutive season as the Swans won both the Football League Trophy, as well as defending the FAW Premier Cup. During the close season he completed his UEFA Pro Licence in coaching.

The following season saw the team struggle for consistency and receive criticism from both their fans and chairman. Despite initially stating that he was the right candidate to take the club forward, Jackett surprised his chairman by resigning on 15 February 2007, stating that he felt he "no longer has the 100 per cent support of everybody connected with the club from the fans, the media, the players and the board alike" and so departed by "mutual agreement".

=== Millwall ===
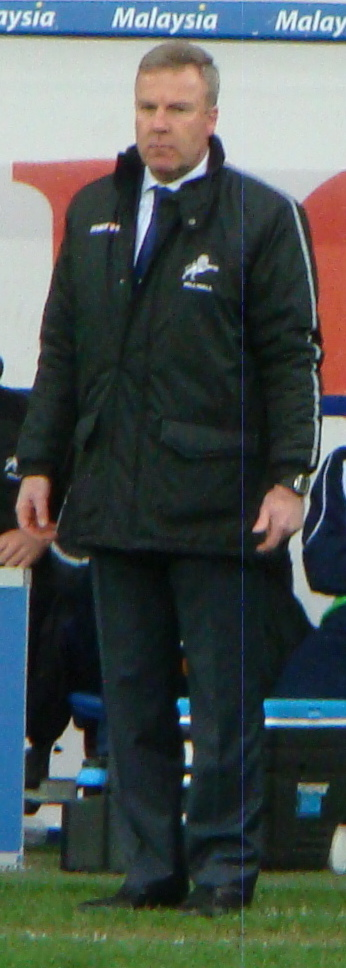
Jackett whilst Millwall manager

Following his exit from Swansea Jackett was soon appointed reserve team manager of Manchester City on 7 March 2007. Later in the year he was interviewed for the vacant managerial post at League One club Millwall after the sacking of Willie Donachie, but initially pulled out of the running. However, on 6 November 2007 he left the Premier League club to take up this position.

After a 17th-place finish in the 2007–08 season, Jackett led the team to the play-offs in his first full campaign with the Lions. After defeating Leeds United in the semi-finals to reach their first-ever play-off final, they lost 3–2 against Scunthorpe United.

In the following season Millwall enjoyed a strong second half of the season, challenging promotion favourites Leeds for second spot and automatic promotion. They fell a point short, finishing third, meaning a second consecutive play-off campaign for Jackett and Millwall. Once again he led the team to the final, where this time a solitary goal against Swindon Town was enough to return the club to the Championship; this was the first time in Millwall's history that they had won promotion via the play-offs.

In their first season back in the Championship, Jackett led Millwall to a ninth-place finish, with the team in play-off contention up until the penultimate game of the season. During 2011–12 though, Millwall struggled for most of the season, remaining close to the relegation zone until a strong finish to the season won Jackett the Championship Manager of the Month Award for April 2012, and ensured their survival.

Jackett once again led Millwall to Wembley in the 2012–13 season, when the team reached the semi-finals of the FA Cup where they lost to eventual winners Wigan Athletic. Although the team had occupied a play-off place around Christmas, they suffered a late season slump and only confirmed their Championship status on the final day of the season, ending in 20th place. Three days after the season concluded he resigned, saying he felt "the time is right for a new challenge, and also for a new manager to come into Millwall with fresh ideas". The Millwall board accepted his decision "with reluctance".

=== Wolverhampton Wanderers ===
On 31 May 2013, Jackett was announced as the new head coach of Wolverhampton Wanderers following the sacking of Dean Saunders. He took over with the club competing at the third level for the first time since 1989, and began his tenure at the club with a goalless draw at Preston. The team went on to record a run of victories which earned Jackett a nomination as the August League One Manager of the Month, and which brought the club their best ever start in a league campaign. Jackett was again nominated for the Manager of the Month Award in October following an unbeaten run where his side earned 10 points from four games.

Under his command, Wolves gained promotion back to the Championship at the first attempt as League One champions and set a new divisional points record of 103. At the conclusion of the season, he was announced as joint-winner of the LMA Awards Manager of the Year for League One, having earlier won the monthly award for March 2014. He then led the club to a seventh-placed finish in the Championship, narrowly missing out on the playoffs. The following season was less successful as the team finished in 14th place, having failed to mount a promotion challenge.

In July 2016 the club was purchased by the Chinese conglomerate Fosun International. Although media speculation cited Julen Lopetegui as being Jackett's replacement upon the takeover being completed, the new owners initially confirmed that they planned to work with Jackett after Lopetegui was appointed coach of the Spain national team. However, four days later, on 29 July 2016, the club confirmed that Jackett's contract had been terminated.

=== Rotherham United ===
Jackett was announced as Rotherham United manager on 21 October 2016, following the sacking of Alan Stubbs. He signed a three-year contract with the bottom-placed Championship club. Jackett resigned as manager on 28 November after 39 days and five games in charge.

=== Portsmouth ===
In June 2017, Jackett signed a two-year contract to become Portsmouth manager, after the previous manager, Paul Cook had left Portsmouth in late May to join Wigan Athletic.

In November 2017, Jackett's contract was extended by a further two years to June 2021. On 31 March 2019, Jackett led Portsmouth to the EFL Trophy final, winning the tournament against Sunderland 5–4 on penalties after the game finished 2–2 in extra time.

On 14 March 2021, Jackett was dismissed as manager of Portsmouth.

=== Leyton Orient ===
On 21 May 2021, Jackett was announced as manager of Leyton Orient. Jackett was relieved from his duties on 22 February 2022 immediately following a 2–0 home defeat to Bristol Rovers that left the club in 19th position. The club had failed to win any of their previous 11 matches, losing nine of them.

=== Gillingham ===
Shortly after the takeover of Gillingham by American businessman Brad Galinson in late 2022, Jackett was appointed director of football on 5 January 2023. He left Gillingham in November 2024 on medical grounds.

== Death ==
Jackett died on 11 June 2026, aged 64. His death was announced the following day.

== Managerial statistics ==
Managerial record by team and tenure
Team	From	To	Record				
Team	From	To	P	W	D	L	Win %
Watford	1 June 1996	1 June 1997	55	20	20	15	36.4
Swansea City	5 April 2004	15 February 2007	156	69	40	47	44.2
Millwall	6 November 2007	7 May 2013	307	130	74	103	42.3
Wolverhampton Wanderers	31 May 2013	29 July 2016	150	69	43	38	46.0
Rotherham United	21 October 2016	28 November 2016	5	0	1	4	0.0
Portsmouth	2 June 2017	14 March 2021	211	107	44	60	50.7
Leyton Orient	21 May 2021	22 February 2022	38	12	14	12	31.6
Total			922	407	236	279	44.1

== Honours ==
=== As a player ===
Watford

- FA Cup runner-up: 1983–84

=== As a manager ===
Swansea City

- Football League Two third-place promotion: 2004–05
- Football League Trophy: 2005–06
- FAW Premier Cup: 2004–05, 2005–06

Manchester City Reserves

- Manchester Senior Cup: 2006–07

Millwall

- Football League One play-offs: 2010

Wolverhampton Wanderers

- Football League One: 2013–14

Portsmouth

- EFL Trophy: 2018–19; runner-up: 2019–20

Individual

- Football League One Manager of the Month: September 2008, October 2009, March 2010, March 2014
- Football League Championship Manager of the Month: April 2012, November 2012, August 2014
- LMA League One Manager of the Year: 2013–14 (shared)
