= Shirley Towers fire =

Fire in a tower block in Southampton, Hampshire, England on 6 April 2010

- Date: 6 April 2010
- Location: Church Street, Shirley, Southampton, England; 50.9237°N 1.4333°W
- Cause: Light fitting set fire to curtains
- Deaths: 2 firefighters
- Injuries: 2 firefighters

The Shirley Towers Fire occurred in a tower block on 6 April 2010 in Southampton, Hampshire, England. Two firefighters were killed when a fire developed and spread from the ninth floor. The investigations and inquiries following the fire led to changes in fire safety rules nationally, particularly the regulations around electrical wiring.

== Background ==
Shirley Towers is a 15-storey concrete tower block of 150 apartments located in the Shirley area of Southampton and is home to about 400 people. The building dates from the mid-1960s and is of the unusual scissor section construction where each apartment is spread over several floors in an interlocking design.

Shirley Towers
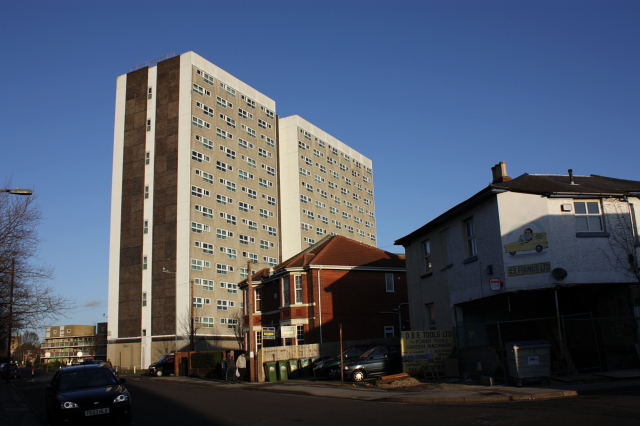
- Shirley towers from Church Street
- Interactive map of the Shirley Towers area

General information
- Location: Church Street, Southampton, SO15 5PE, Southampton, United Kingdom
- Construction started: 1965
- Completed: 1967
- Owner: Southampton City Council
- Landlord: Southampton City Council

Height
- Height: 46 metres (150 ft 11 in)

Technical details
- Structural system: Reema
- Floor count: 15

Other information
- Number of units: 150

== The fire ==
The fire started when curtains in the lounge of the flat caught fire from being on top of an uplighter lamp (light fitting.) Emergency crews were called at 20:10 on 6 April 2010. The fire response teams were confused by the complex layout of the building and of the flat itself. The flat was very smoky with zero visibility and firefighters did not locate the fire in the lounge. The flat rapidly became very hot - more than 1,000°C. The firefighters tried to escape through the flat's fire exit on the 11th floor. Two firefighters managed to escape but needed hospital treatment for burns. Firefighters James Shears and Alan Bannon were overcome by sudden exposure to intense heat and died at the top landing of the flat. The escaping firefighters got tangled in cables that fell from the roof, both inside and outside the flat, after the heat from the fire melted the plastic trunking they were contained in.

== Inquest and Inquiry ==
The Coroner's inquest highlighted the "extremely difficult and dangerous" conditions in the fire, but noted that "numerous factors" led to the eventual tragedy which could be addressed to stop a similar future tragedy. After the inquest the coroner issued a "Rule 43 letter." This is a letter to other statutory authorities designed to prevent future deaths.

The Rule 43 letter made nine recommendations to the Government and fire services. These included:

- Improved training for firefighters.
- Changing building regulations to ensure fire resistant cable supports.
- Fitting of sprinklers to existing residential buildings over 30 metres tall.
- Improved escape signage.

Changes to the British Standards electrical wiring regulations finally came into force in July 2015 following the Shirley Towers tragedy, and the previous Harrow Court fire, where similar problems were a factor in firefighter deaths.

== See also ==
- Harrow Court fire
- Lakanal House Fire
- Grenfell Tower fire
