= Lowri Gwilym =

Welsh radio and television producer (1954–2010)

Lowri Gwilym (born Lowri Williams; 14 October 1954 – 21 July 2010) was a Welsh television and radio producer. She worked for BBC Wales and the Welsh-language channel S4C.

== Early life ==
Gwilym was born Lowri Williams on 14 October 1954 in Aberystwyth. Her parents were Daisy and David Gwyn Williams, a writer and academic. She grew up in Turkey and Libya, where her father was an English professor. When she was 18, she changed her surname from Williams to the Welsh form, Gwilym. She studied the Welsh language at Bangor University and completed a Master of Letters at the University of Oxford. She then lectured at the University of Bologna for two years.

== Career ==
Gwilym joined BBC Wales in the 1980s and produced and directed numerous documentary television programmes over two decades. These included the Welsh-language series O Flaen dy Lygaid (Before Your Very Eyes) and the English-language series Women in Politics. In the late 1980s she produced documentaries about various women in politics, including Eugenia Charles, Simone Veil, Tatyana Zaslavskaya and Benazir Bhutto. She also worked as a freelance radio producer and created the radio show Beti a'i Phobol (Beti and Her People), hosted by Beti George, for BBC Wales.

Gwilym was hired by S4C, a Welsh-language television channel, in 2004 as the editor for factual programmes and co-productions. Her productions for S4C included O'r Galon (From the Heart), Wynebau Newydd (New Faces), Cefn Gwlad (Countryside), Ffermio (Farming), and nature programmes hosted by Iolo Williams. She was a content editor on the current-affairs programmes Y Byd ar Bedwar (The World on Four) and Wedi 7 (After 7). In 2010, she won a BAFTA Cymru award for her on Dwy Wraig Lloyd George (The Two Wives of Lloyd George).

== Death ==
Gwilym died of a sudden cerebral hemorrhage on 21 July 2010; she was 55 years old. Her partner was the television journalist Meic Birtwistle, with whom she had two sons, Ifan and Glyn.
