= Star Wheel Press =

Scottish Aberfeldy-based indie/folk/pop band

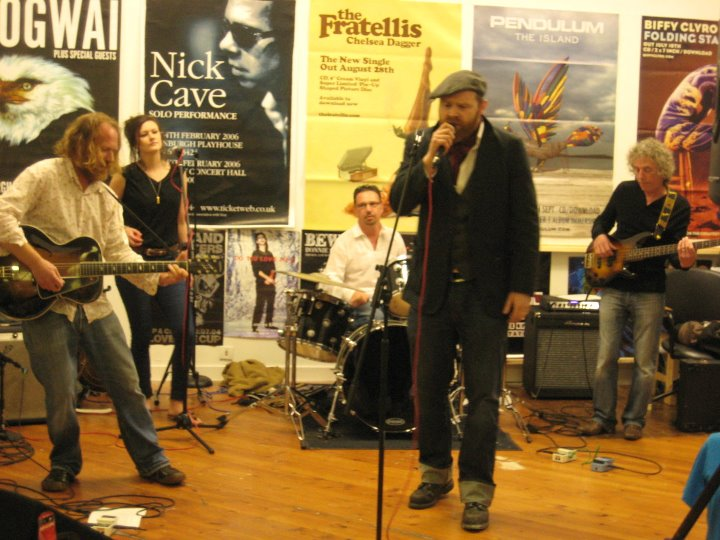
- Star Wheel Press at Avalanche Records

Background information
- Origin: Aberfeldy, Scotland, UK
- Genres: Indie, folk, pop
- Years active: 2010–present
- Members: Craig Milton; Ryan Hannigan; Jimmy Gallagher; Greg Bell; Denis Gallagher

Star Wheel Press is a Scottish indie/folk/pop band from Aberfeldy, Scotland. It was formed in 2010 when the guitarist and banjo player Craig Milton met the singer and lyricist Ryan Hannigan at a gig by the Edinburgh indie pop band Aberfeldy in the town after which it is named.

The band released an album in 2011, Life Cycle of a Falling Bird, which was that year's biggest selling album in the Avalanche Records shop in Edinburgh after extensive patronage by the shop's management and the renowned crime novelist Ian Rankin.

== Airplay and press coverage ==
The band's first radio airplay was by Lauren Laverne on BBC 6 Music with other DJs on the station and a number of presenters on BBC Radio Scotland such as Vic Galloway, Ricky Ross and Tom Morton also playing it.

Media coverage has been led by Radar, the new music blog of The Scotsman newspaper which has covered them on several occasions, with others such as Is This Music? and God is in the TV also reviewing them.

Print coverage includes The Spectator and the Daily Record.

== Live shows ==
Live performances include the Southern Fried Festival in Perth with Samantha Crain, support slots with The Blind Boys of Alabama, Lyle Lovett, the 2011 Aberfeldy Festival alongside James Yorkston and Admiral Fallow and a headline show at the Wee Red Bar in Edinburgh Students Union in September 2011 with support from French Wives.
