= Attack! Attack! (Welsh band) =

Welsh rock band

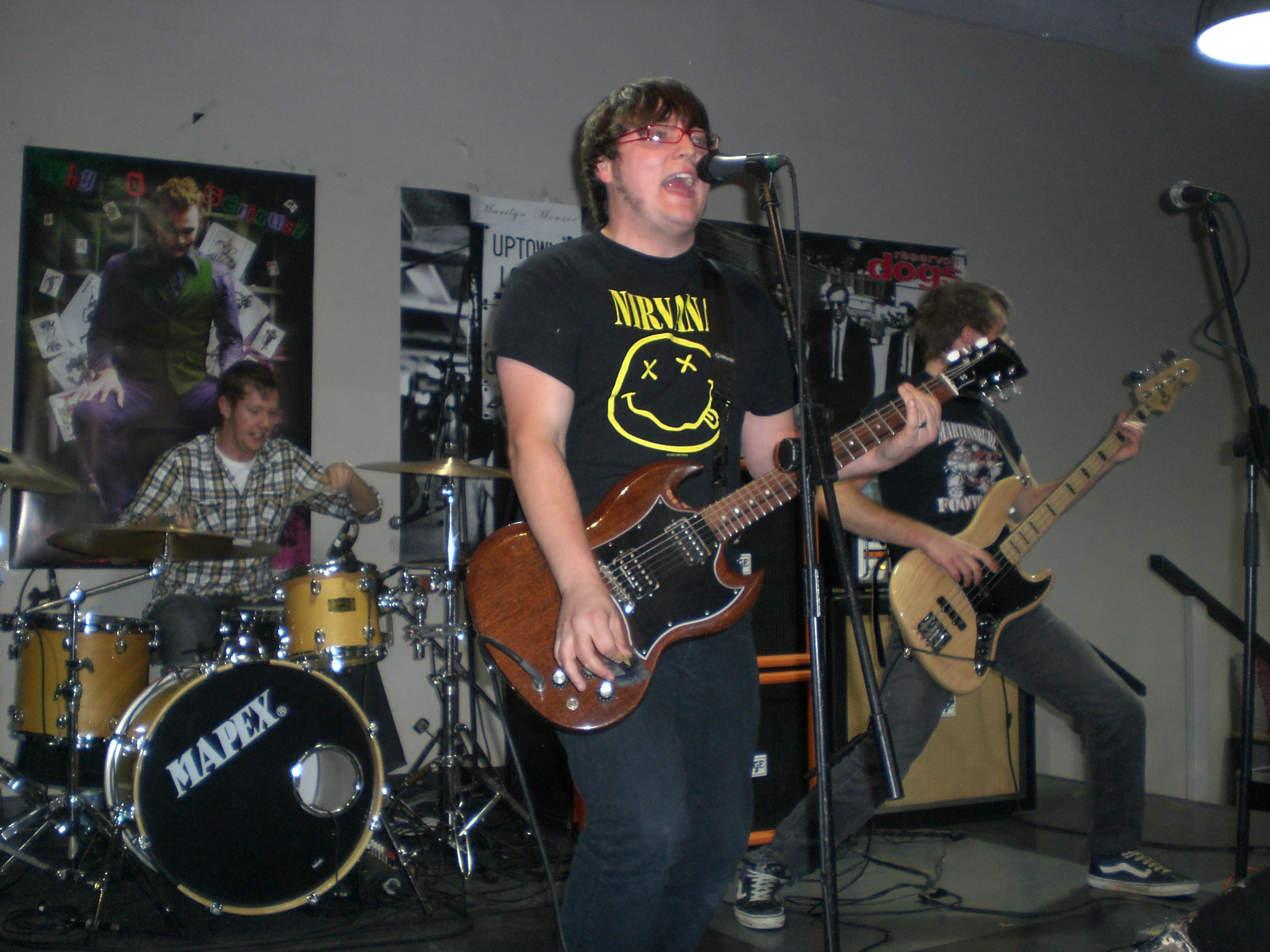
- Attack! Attack! in 2008

Background information
- Origin: Caerphilly, Wales
- Genres: Alternative rock, pop punk, emo pop
- Years active: 2006–2013
- Labels: Rock Ridge, Hassle
- Past members: Neil Starr; Ryan Day; Will Davies; Mike Griffiths

Attack! Attack! were a Welsh alternative rock band from Caerphilly and Aberdare, formed in 2006. They released their self-titled debut album in 2008, with a second album The Latest Fashion released on 27 September 2010 through Hassle Records. Their third album, Long Road to Nowhere, was announced for a 1 April 2013 release, and this was later stated as their final release. The band played a farewell headliner in April/May 2013.

== History ==
The band toured across the UK with other British bands such as The Blackout, Funeral for a Friend, Lostprophets, Kids in Glass Houses and also American bands like New Found Glory and Zebrahead. Neil Starr came from Dopamine to form Attack! Attack! with Ryan Day. Will Davies came from the band Adequate Seven. Ryan Day and Mike Griffiths also played together in Pete's Sake.

The band finished a co-headlining UK tour with Tonight Is Goodbye during February 2009, with the two bands exchanging the headlining and main support positions every night. They played at the Hevy Music Festival on 1 August 2009 and at Butserfest on 12 September 2009. Their song "You and Me" is featured in the video game Guitar Hero 5. The band played their first headline tour with support acts Not Advised, Gap Year Riot and Impulse 11.

In 2012, Ryan Day left Attack! Attack! to form a side project with former members of The Next Nine Years, also from South Wales.

On 22 March 2013, the band announced their decision to split after months of deliberating, stating that they will finish their tour but, for personal reasons, without Ryan Day and Mike Griffiths.

Neil and Will then formed the band States and Empires with drummer Johno Fisher from the band Evita. The new band toured with Zebrahead in October 2013 across Europe before recording their debut album.

In 2017, Neil Starr joined Phil Campbell and the Bastard Sons as lead vocalist; it is not clear if this means the end of States and Empires.

== Members ==
- Neil Starr – lead vocals, rhythm guitar (2006–2013)
- Will Davies – bass (2006–2013)
- Mike Griffiths – drums, percussion (2006–2013)
- Ryan Day – lead guitar, backing vocals (2006–2012)

== Discography ==
Albums

- Attack! Attack! (2008) (released in US as Attack! Attack! UK on Rock Ridge Music)
- The Latest Fashion (2010)
- Attack! Attack! Unplugged (2012)
- Long Road to Nowhere (2013)
- Bsides and Unreleased (2014)

EPs

- Not Afraid (2010)

Singles

- 2008: "You and Me"
- 2008: "This Is a Test" – 7-inch vinyl, CD
- 2008: "Too Bad Son" – 7-inch vinyl
- 2009: "Not Afraid" – 7-inch vinyl, CD (Promo On Tour)
- 2010: "We're Not the Enemy"
- 2011: "Blood on My Hands"
- 2011: "No Excuses"
- 2013: "Cut to the Chase"

== Music videos ==
- 2008: The band made a promotional music video for "Too Bad Son", a song from their debut full-length album, Attack! Attack!. This video was never released to the public, and only available online. The video features the band members' self recordings while on tour. It is available on Attack! Attack!'s YouTube.
- 2008: The band played at Reading Festival on the BBC Introducing stage. They performed two songs; "Say It to Me", and "This Is a Test". Both songs were recorded and are featured on the band's official MySpace profile page.
- 2009: "You and Me", features the band playing it TVs then coming to life.
- 2010: The band released a video for their 2009 single "Not Afraid" with a story-line. A kid is getting bullied, and with confidence and support. Attack! Attack! release the power to the kid, who fights off the bullies and scares them away. This video was filmed at Fisher More High School in Colne, Lancashire.
- 2010: "We're Not the Enemy" second single from Latest Fashion, it has the band playing. With televisions as their heads.
- 2011: "Blood on My Hands" is set in an unknown location shows clips of Neil (the lead singer) singing in a hippy van with a performance near some water, which Neil in standing knee deep in while the band perform on rocks above Neil.

== Tours ==
- 2010 Tours: Attack! Attack! the Rock Show (Featuring Not Advised, Gap Year Riot & Impulse 11)
- 2010 Tours: Attack! Attack! The Latest Fashion Tour (Featuring Freeze the Atlantic, Straight Lines & That Sunday Feeling)
- 2011 Tours: Attack! Attack! The Latest Fashion Tour (Featuring 7 Day Weekend)
