= Frank Jackett =

Welsh footballer (1927–2010)

Personal information
- Date of birth: 5 July 1927
- Place of birth: Ystalyfera, Wales
- Date of death: 14 April 2010 (aged 82)
- Place of death: England
- Position: Wing half

Senior career*
Years	Team	Apps	(Gls)
19xx–1949	Pontardawe Athletic	?	(?)
1949–1953	Watford	14	(0)
1953–1954	Leyton Orient	4	(0)
1954–19xx	Ramsgate	?	(?)
Total		18	(0)
- * Club domestic league appearances and goals

Frank Jackett (5 July 1927 – 14 April 2010) was a Welsh professional footballer who played as a wing half.

== Career ==
Jackett moved from Pontardawe Athletic to Watford, making 14 appearances in the English Football League for them between 1949 and 1953. He then spent a season at Leyton Orient, making a further 4 league appearances, before moving into non-league football with Ramsgate.

== Personal life ==
Jackett died on 14 April 2010, at the age of 82. He was the father of Kenny Jackett, also a professional footballer.
