= Police authority =

UK law enforcement oversight organisation

A police authority in the United Kingdom is a public authority that is responsible for overseeing the operations of a police force. The nature and composition of police authorities has varied over time, and there are now just four dedicated "police authorities" in the United Kingdom, although the term can refer to various similar successor bodies.

Until 2012/13, individual police authorities were maintained for each of the 43 territorial police forces in England and Wales, and for the 8 territorial police forces in Scotland. Police authorities in England and Wales were abolished in November 2012, and replaced with directly elected police and crime commissioners, and those in Scotland were merged in April 2013 to form the Scottish Police Authority as part of the creation of Police Scotland, the single police force for Scotland. The Police Service of Northern Ireland is overseen by the Northern Ireland Policing Board, and two of the three UK-wide special police forces continue to be overseen by individual police authorities. The oversight of the two police forces serving London continues to be implemented via unique arrangements.

== England and Wales ==
=== Early history to 1964 ===
The introduction of police forces on a national scale in England and Wales began with the Municipal Corporations Act 1835, which required each borough to establish a "watch committee" and thus appoint constables to "preserve the peace". Before the advent of police authorities, the regulatory bodies for police forces confined to a single borough were these watch committees, whilst those for counties from 1889 had been "standing joint committees" (after 1889 some control passed to the elected county council; the joint committee also had magistrates).

=== 1964: creation of independent police authorities ===
The Police Act 1964 introduced major reforms to the organisation and oversight of the police in England and Wales, following the report of the Royal Commission on the Police in 1962. The 1964 act abolished the old watch committee system which had come under severe criticism following several high-profile corruption scandals.

The act introduced police areas, which would be administrative counties, county boroughs or "combined police areas", consisting of combinations of counties and county boroughs, served by a single force, overseen by an independent "police authority". The new police authorities would consist of two-thirds elected members of county or borough councils, and one-third magistrates. Under the Local Government Act 1972 the remaining borough police forces were abolished, and police authorities consisted of county councillors and magistrates in a ratio of two to one.

The Police and Magistrates' Courts Act 1994 altered the composition of the authorities with independent members being added. Typically, a police authority was made up of seventeen members – nine elected members (who were drawn from the local authority or authorities for the force area, and would be reflective of the political makeup of those authorities). The remaining eight members were called independent members, and were appointed from the local community for fixed terms of four years by the police authority itself - a long list, from applications received, was submitted by a committee of elected members and magistrates to the Home Office. That committee then appointed the independent members from a shortlist returned by the Home Office. At least three of the police authority's independent members were magistrates. There was no difference in power or responsibility between the different types of member – there were examples of elected, independent and magistrate members chairing police authorities throughout England and Wales.

Unlike the other police services in England and Wales, the police authority for the Metropolitan Police was the Home Secretary rather than a committee of councillors and magistrates. In 1995, as Home Secretary, Michael Howard established the Metropolitan Police Committee, to advise him in exercising these responsibilities.

==== Funding ====
The bulk of police funding came from the Home Office in the form of an annual grant (calculated on a proportionate basis by the Home Office to take into account the differences between the 43 forces in England and Wales, which vary significantly in terms of population, geographical size and crime levels and trends), though police authorities could also set a precept on the Council Tax to raise additional funds. The Home Office had the power to prevent any precept increases deemed to be excessive. It was the police authority's responsibility to set the budget for the force area, which included allocating itself enough money from the overall policing budget to ensure that it can discharge its own functions effectively.

In its annual Policing Plan, a police authority was obliged to publish its budget for the year, as well as a value for money statement and to outline planned efficiency savings.

==== Inspections ====
Her Majesty's Inspectorate of Constabulary and the Audit Commission (or the Welsh Audit Commission in Wales) began a programme of inspection for police authorities in September 2009. Inspection scores four areas of police authority capability:

- Setting strategic direction and priorities
- Scrutinising performance outcomes
- Achieving results through community engagement and partnerships
- Ensuring value for money and productivity

Each theme was scored from one to four:

1. Performs poorly
2. Performs adequately
3. Performs well
4. Performs excellently

The police authority was also given an overall score using the same 1-4 system.

Ten inspection reports were published, with the majority of inspected authorities scoring 2. The inspectorates published "Learning Lessons: An overview of the first ten joint inspections of police authorities by HMIC and the Audit Commission", outlining their findings from the first ten inspections, in March 2010.

=== 2012: abolition of police authorities in England and Wales ===
In the 2010 British general election campaign, both the Conservative Party and Liberal Democrats' manifestos outlined plans, respectively, to replace or reform police authorities, both parties raising concerns about the perceived lack of accountability of police authorities to the communities they served. The Conservatives proposed to replace them with a single elected individual (a 'police and crime commissioner', criticised as a model by some in policing), whilst the Liberal Democrats proposed to introduce direct elections to police authorities, whilst strengthening their powers. Following Royal Assent of the Police Reform and Social Responsibility Act 2011 police authorities were abolished and replaced with directly elected police and crime commissioners on 22 November 2012. Many of the outgoing members of police authorities stood for the role of PCC, highlighting their successive experience in the field, and many were elected.

=== London ===
The Metropolitan Police and City of London Police have historically been exceptions to the national rule. The Metropolitan Police were under the direct control of the Home Secretary from their establishment in 1829 until 2000, when the Metropolitan Police Authority (MPA) was established under the Greater London Authority to oversee the force. The MPA was replaced in January 2012, alongside the introduction of police and crime commissioners, by the Mayor's Office for Policing and Crime, under the control of the Mayor of London, and reporting to the Police and Crime Committee of the London Assembly. Unlike the other police forces in England and Wales, where the chief officer is appointed by the locally elected police and crime commissioner, the national and international importance of the work of the Metropolitan Police means the appointment of the Metropolitan Police Commissioner is still in the hands of the Home Secretary (and constitutionally made by the Monarch), although they must "have regard to any recommendations made" by the Mayor of London since the introduction of that position in 2000.

The City of London Corporation has been the police authority for the City of London Police since their formal establishment in 1839. Despite the introduction of police and crime commissioners in 2012, the function of the Corporation as the police authority was retained by the Police Reform and Social Responsibility Act 2011. This function is currently exercised by the Police Authority Board of the Court of Common Council, the elected body that runs the Corporation. Eleven of the members of the Board — including the chair and their deputy — are elected members of the Common Council, and the other three are appointed independent members. The appointment of the Commissioner of the City of London Police is now made by the Common Council (although technically by the Monarch).

== Northern Ireland ==
The Police Service of Northern Ireland (PSNI) is supervised by the Northern Ireland Policing Board, of which ten are members of the Northern Ireland Assembly and nine are independent. The Board and the PSNI are the successors to the Police Authority for Northern Ireland and Royal Ulster Constabulary respectively, who they replaced on 4 November 2001.

== Scotland ==
In Scotland, supervision of the police was historically the responsibility of the elected local authority which either directly supervised the local police force where its border was conterminous with the force, or through joint boards with neighbouring local authorities where one force covered more than one council area. The eight territorial police forces in Scotland were replaced in April 2013 by Police Scotland, which is overseen by the Scottish Police Authority, an independent public body that reports to the Scottish Parliament. The SPA also incorporated the Scottish Police Services Authority, which was the police authority for the Scottish Crime and Drug Enforcement Agency (itself merged into Police Scotland).

=== Single authority ===
The following police forces were supervised by one single local authority:

Police force	Local authority
Dumfries and Galloway Constabulary	Dumfries and Galloway
Fife Constabulary	Fife

=== Joint police boards ===
The following police forces were supervised by a joint board:

Police force	Joint board authorities
Central Scotland Police	Clackmannanshire, Falkirk and Stirling
Grampian Police	Aberdeenshire, Aberdeen City and Moray
Lothian and Borders Police	City of Edinburgh, East Lothian, Scottish Borders, Midlothian and West Lothian
Northern Constabulary	Highland, Orkney, Shetland and Na h-Eileanan Siar (Western Isles)
Strathclyde Police	Argyll and Bute, East Ayrshire, East Dunbartonshire, East Renfrewshire, Glasgow City, Inverclyde, North Ayrshire, North Lanarkshire, Renfrewshire, South Ayrshire, South Lanarkshire and West Dunbartonshire
Tayside Police	Angus, Dundee City and Perth and Kinross

== Special police forces ==
The various special police forces in the United Kingdom each have different oversight arrangements.

=== British Transport Police ===
The British Transport Police, a privately funded police force responsible for policing the railways of Great Britain, is overseen by the British Transport Police Authority. The Authority was created in 2004 by the Railways and Transport Safety Act 2003 and is made up of approximately 12-15 members, each of whom represents groups concerned with the control, operation or use of the railways. They include representatives of the railway operators, railway users (freight and passenger), employees and the appropriate government departments dealing with transport in England, Scotland and Wales.

=== Civil Nuclear Constabulary ===
The Civil Nuclear Constabulary, which polices nuclear power-related facilities and shipments in the United Kingdom, is overseen by the Civil Nuclear Police Authority. The Authority was created in 2004 by the Energy Act 2004; it is made up of eight members; four are nominated by the nuclear industry, while the remaining four include the Chairman.

=== Ministry of Defence Police ===
The Ministry of Defence Police does not have a police authority; however, the Ministry of Defence Police Committee, established by the Ministry of Defence Police Act 1987, advises the Secretary of State for Defence on matters concerning the Ministry of Defence Police. The Committee (or its members) also has various functions in determining police misconduct and appeals cases.
