= Northern Constabulary =

Former police force in Scotland, United Kingdom

Northern Constabulary Poileas a' Chinn a Tuath
- Motto: Dion is Cuidich (Scottish Gaelic); Protect and Serve

Agency overview
- Formed: 16 May 1975 (merger)
- Dissolved: 2013 (amalgamation)
- Superseding agency: Police Scotland

Jurisdictional structure
- Operations jurisdiction: Highland, Western Isles, Orkney Islands and Shetland Islands, Scotland
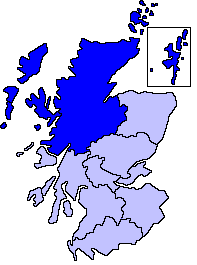
- Map of Northern Constabulary's jurisdiction
- Area: 31,186 km²
- Population: approx. 300,000

Operational structure
- Headquarters: Inverness
- Sworn members: Approx 715
- Agency executive: George Graham, Chief Constable
- Divisions or Area Commands: 8

Facilities
- Stations: 71

Website
- www.northern.police.uk

The Northern Constabulary (Scottish Gaelic: Poileas a' Chinn a Tuath) was the territorial police force responsible for Northern Scotland, covering the Highland council area along with the Western Isles, the Orkney Islands and the Shetland Islands, which make up most of the Highlands and Islands area. It was the police force covering the largest geographical area in the United Kingdom, equivalent to the size of Belgium, but was one of the smallest in terms of officers, with about 715 officers. The Constabulary was one of those amalgamated to form Police Scotland in 2013. The force was formed on 16 May 1975 as a merger of several smaller constabularies.

== History ==
This police force was formed on 16 May 1975 as a merger of the pre-existing Northern Constabulary, the Ross and Sutherland Constabulary (itself a merger of Ross and Cromarty Constabulary and Sutherland Constabulary) and the Inverness Constabulary (a merger of Inverness Burgh Police and Inverness-shire Constabulary), along with the northernmost portion of the Argyll County Police area, and the Nairn part of the Scottish North East Counties Constabulary. The previous Northern Constabulary had been created in 1969 by the merger of the Caithness Constabulary, Orkney Constabulary and Zetland Constabulary.

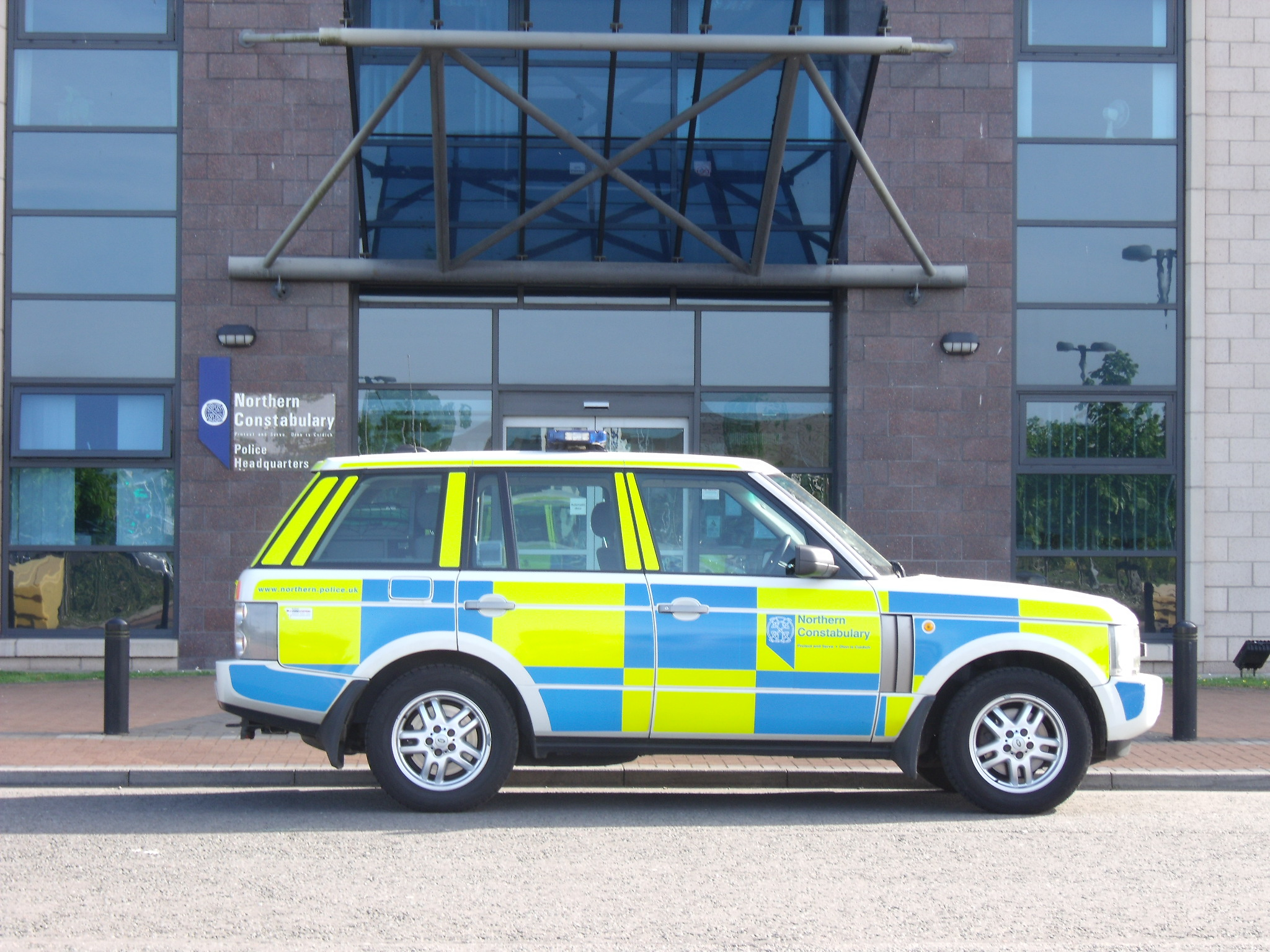
Northern Constabulary Range Rover with Battenburg markings, 2009

The new Northern Constabulary was created at the same time as local government reorganisation created the Highland regional council and the islands councils of the Western Isles, Orkney and Shetland. The rest of the Argyll County Police was merged into the Strathclyde Police, and the rest of the Scottish North East Counties Constabulary into the Grampian Police.

The Northern Constabulary area was the same as that covered by the Highlands and Islands Fire and Rescue Service.

To help keep decision-making as local as possible, Northern was at the forefront nationally in Devolved Resource Management (DRM) for many years. The Chief Constable allocated one-line budgets to each of his Area Commanders, closely monitoring progress across a range of indicators, over the year, through regular Performance Review and Performance Review Boards.

An Act of the Scottish Parliament, the Police and Fire Reform (Scotland) Act 2012, created a single Police Service of Scotland - known as Police Scotland - with effect from 1 April 2013. This merged the eight regional police forces in Scotland (including Northern Constabulary), together with the Scottish Crime and Drug Enforcement Agency, into a single service covering the whole of Scotland. Police Scotland has its headquarters at the Scottish Police College at Tulliallan in Fife.

== Divisions and Area Commands ==
Northern Constabulary was split into three Divisions: North, Central, and East.

In these three Divisions there were eight Area Commands, each with their own Area Commander. The Divisions and their respective Area Commands are shown below:

Division	Area Commands
Central	Ross and Cromarty
Central	Lochaber, Skye, and Lochalsh
Central	Western Isles
East	Inverness
East	Badenoch, Strathspey, and Nairn
North	Shetland
North	Orkney
North	Caithness, Sutherland, and East Ross

== Uniform ==
Until the early 21st century, the uniform consisted of a white shirt, black tie and a stab-proof vest. Northern Constabulary was the last police force in Scotland using shirts and ties. In 2009, the uniform changed to become similar to that of other police forces of Scotland: black shirt with force logo, stab-proof vest and black trousers.

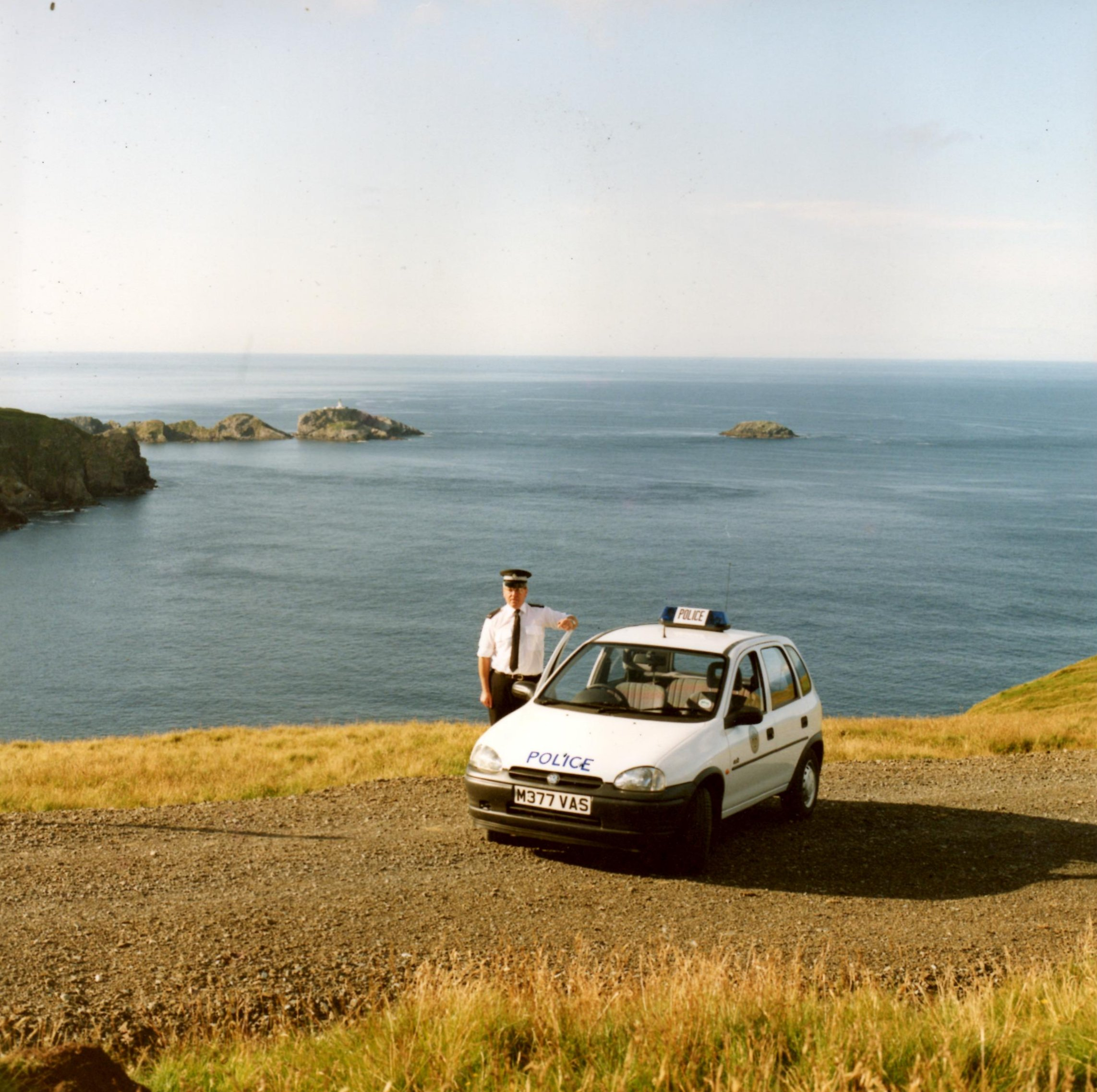
Northern Constabulary officer on the northern tip of Unst in the Shetland Islands, 1995

== Chief Constables ==
Chief constables were:

- 1975–1985 : Donald Burnie Henderson
- 1985–1996 : Hugh MacMillan
- 1996–2001 : William Robertson
- 2001–2011 : Ian Latimer
- 2011–2013 : George Graham

== See also ==
- List of defunct law enforcement agencies in the United Kingdom
