= Police Complaints Commissioner for Scotland =

- Abbreviation: PCCS
- Predecessor: Her Majesty's Inspectorate of Constabulary Scotland
- Successor: Police Investigations and Review Commissioner
- Formation: 1 April 2007; 19 years ago
- Dissolved: 31 March 2013; 13 years ago
- Legal status: executive non-departmental public body
- Purpose: Complaints about the Scottish police
- Location: Hamilton Business Park, Caird Park, Hamilton, South Lanarkshire
- Region served: Scotland
- Commissioner: John McNeill
- Parent organization: Scottish Government

The Police Complaints Commissioner for Scotland (PCCS) was the executive non-departmental public body of the Scottish Government responsible for overseeing the system for handling complaints made by members of the public against the police force of Scotland. It operated between 1 April 2007 and 31 March 2013.

== History ==
It was created under the Police, Public Order and Criminal Justice (Scotland) Act 2006. The PCCS took over its role from Her Majesty's Inspectorate of Constabulary Scotland on 1 April 2007. The first commissioner was Jim Martin.

John McNeill succeeded Martin as Commissioner and assumed office on 17 August 2009, for a three-year term. He was previously a prison governor in both Scotland and Northern Ireland.

The Commissioner only handled non-criminal complaints; complaints involving allegations of criminality needed to be referred to the Crown Office and Procurator Fiscal Service.

In December 2009, McNeill responded to a 13% rise in complaints against the police in 2008/09 by stating: "I would argue that any increase in complaints arises in part from the public having more confidence in the police and expecting higher standards from them."

In March 2010, McNeill urged Scottish police forces to adopt common guidelines about recording complaints. Later that year McNeill reported a further rise in complaints received for the 2010/11 period, also noting that police bodies were highlighting in their final responses to complainers a right of redress to the commissioner.

On 1 April 2013 it was replaced by the Police Investigations and Review Commissioner.

== See also ==
- Independent Police Complaints Commission - corresponding body in England and Wales
