= Police Investigations and Review Commissioner =

Scottish police oversight organisation

Police Investigation and Review Commissioner

Agency overview
- Formed: 1 April 2013
- Preceding agency: Police Complaints Commissioner for Scotland
- Type: Executive non-departmental public body
- Jurisdiction: Scotland
- Headquarters: Hamilton House, Hamilton Business Park, Caird Park, Hamilton, ML3 0QA Tel: 01698 542900; 55.783°N 4.049°E
- Employees: approx. 100
- Minister responsible: Angela Constance, Cabinet Secretary for Justice
- Agency executive: Laura Paton, Police Investigation and Review Commissioner
- Parent agency: Scottish Government
- Website: www.pirc.scot

Map
- Scotland in the UK and Europe

The Police Investigations and Review Commissioner (PIRC) is the executive non-departmental public body of the Scottish Government responsible for investigating complaints by members of the public against Police Scotland; and the Scottish operations of the National Crime Agency, British Transport Police, Civil Nuclear Constabulary, Ministry of Defence Police, and HM Revenue and Customs.

== History ==
On 1 April 2013, the Police and Fire Reform (Scotland) Act 2012 brought together Scotland's eight territorial police services, the Scottish Crime and Drug Enforcement Agency and the Scottish Police Services Authority into the new national police service, Police Scotland. At the same time the remit of the Police Complaints Commissioner for Scotland expanded to include investigations into the most serious incidents involving the police. To reflect this change, the Police Complaints Commissioner for Scotland was renamed the Police Investigations & Review Commissioner.

In June 2014, Kate Frame was appointed as the new Police Investigations and Review Commissioner, taking up the post in August.

In June 2019, Michelle Macleod was appointed by ministers as the new Police Investigations and Review Commissioner, taking up the post in the August of that year.

In January 2025, Laura Paton was appointed by ministers as the new Police Investigations and Review Commissioner, taking up the post in April of that year.

== Criticism ==
The PIRC have previously been criticised for using 'oppressive and dehumanising tactics' as part of its investigations by the body which represents police officers in Scotland, who stated that its members were fast losing confidence in the 'effectiveness and genuine independence' of the organisation. This was raised at a meeting of the Justice Committee of the Scottish Parliament.

In May 2018, prominent lawyer Aamer Anwar called on the Commissioner Kate Frame to resign after claiming that organisation had failed to adhere to its values of integrity, impartiality and respect in relation to the investigation into the death of Sheku Bayoh.

== Remit and jurisdiction ==
The PIRC provides independent scrutiny of how police bodies respond to complaints from members of the public.
