= Fife Constabulary =

Agency overview
- Formed: 1949
- Dissolved: 2013

Jurisdictional structure
- Operations jurisdiction: Fife, Scotland
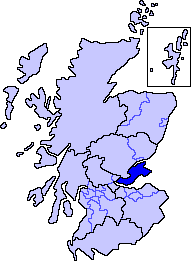
- Map of Fife Constabulary's jurisdiction
- Area: 1,325 km^{2} (512 sq mi)
- Population: 356,740
- General nature: Local civilian police

Operational structure
- Headquarters: Glenrothes
- Police Officers: 1027
- Special Constables: 119
- Agency executive: Norma Graham, Chief constable
- Divisions: 3

Website
- www.fife.police.uk

Fife Officers with Tiger Woods at the 2005 Open Championship

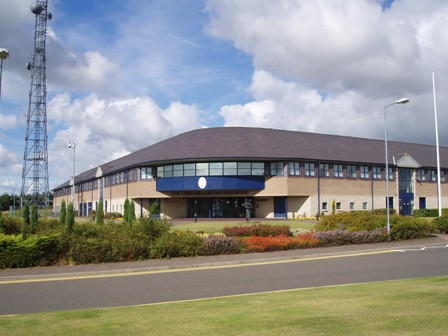
Fife Constabulary headquarters, Glenrothes

Fife Constabulary was the territorial police force responsible for the Scottish council area of Fife.

The area policed by Fife Constabulary had a resident population of just over 350,000, almost a third of whom lived in one of the three principal towns of Dunfermline, Kirkcaldy and Glenrothes. The force was established in 1949 following the amalgamation of the originally independent Fife County, Dunfermline City and Kirkcaldy Burgh police forces. Then the number of Police Officers totalled 345, supported by 26 civilian staff. During 1949, officers dealt with 7,492 crimes and offences. At dissolution the force had 1027 Officers, who were assisted by 119 Special Constables and approximately 538 support staff. Fife Constabulary dealt with around 65,000 crimes and offences annually.

The Chief Constable was responsible for ensuring that the deployment and organisation of personnel is consistent with the demands on the Force. Operational resources were allocated according to the needs of local communities and are complemented by professional administrative and support staff.

An Act of the Scottish Parliament, the Police and Fire Reform (Scotland) Act 2012, created a single Police Service of Scotland – to be known as Police Scotland – with effect from 1 April 2013. This will merge the eight regional police forces in Scotland (including Fife Constabulary), together with the Scottish Crime and Drug Enforcement Agency, into a single service covering the whole of Scotland. Police Scotland has its headquarters at the Scottish Police College at Tulliallan in Fife.

== Divisions ==
Fife Constabulary was divided into three Territorial Divisions. Western Division had a population of approximately 133,000 and its Divisional HQ in Dunfermline. It contained the Scottish Police College at Tulliallan Castle, Kincardine-on-Forth. Central Division was the smallest of the three Divisions but the most densely populated with 148,000 residents, and Divisional HQ in Kirkcaldy. Eastern Division was the largest of the three but had the smallest population of some 69,000. Major concentrations of population are Cupar, home to the Divisional HQ, and St Andrews. Western and Central Divisions were headed by a Chief Superintendent and a Superintendent, and Eastern Division by a Superintendent and a Chief Inspector.

== Force Headquarters ==
The majority of Fife Constabulary's departments and specialist units were based at modern, purpose-built Headquarters, situated at Detroit Road in Viewfield, Glenrothes which were opened on 25 March 1996. They replaced the previous building at Dysart which had been the HQ since 1975. The building includes modern office accommodation, training facilities, lecture theatre, library, garage & communications workshops, television studio, gymnasium, and an indoor firearms range. In 2004, a new Contact Centre was opened on the Headquarters campus, enabling the Force to bring together under one roof the call handling and despatching services which had previously been dispersed across Police stations in Fife.

== Regional police stations ==
Fife Constabulary also had police stations in Aberdour, Anstruther, Auchtermuchty, Ballingry, Burntisland, Cardenden, Cowdenbeath, Cupar, Dunfermline Dalgety Bay, Glenrothes, Inverkeithing, Kelty, Kennoway, Kincardine, Leven, Levenmouth, Lochgelly, Oakley, Rosyth, Tayport and Wormit.

== Chief Constables ==
- 1949–1955 : Sir John Inch
- 1955–1966 : Andrew Meldrum
- <1971–1984 : Robert Fraser Murison
- ?–1996 William MacDougal Moodie
- 1996–2000 : John Hamilton
- 2001–2008 : Peter Wilson
- 2008–2012 : Norma Graham
- 2012–2013 : Andrew Barker

== See also ==
- Fife Constabulary Pipe Band
