= Police Scotland Fife Pipe Band =

Scottish pipe band

- Established: 2007
- Location: Fife, Scotland
- Grade: 1
- Pipe major: David Wilton
- Drum sergeant: Mick O'Neill
- Tartan: Carnegie of Fife

The Police Scotland Fife Pipe Band is a Grade 1 pipe band from Fife in Scotland, established in September 2007.

== History ==
The band was established in September 2007 as the Fife Constabulary Pipe Band, and was placed in the Grade 1 by the RSPBA the following February. Their first competition, at the Dunbar Highland Games in May 2008, saw them awarded first prize.

In August of the same year they made their first appearance at the World Pipe Band Championships and gained entry into the Grade 1 final, having achieved second place amongst fourteen bands in the morning's qualifier round.

In September 2008, the drum corps was replaced by that of the Clan Gregor Society Pipe Band, resulting in the disbandment of the Clan Gregor band.

The first Pipe Major was James Murray, with Andrew Mathieson starting as Pipe Sergeant, both having left Grade 1 band Shotts and Dykehead Caledonia. When James Murray announced he was resigning due to emigrating to Australia, Mathieson took over as Pipe Major. Andrew Mathieson stepped down in July 2013, citing time constraints as a result of increasing family commitments and his work with the junior band so Douglas Murray took over the band as Pipe Major.

Following the merger of Scottish territorial forces and the Scottish Crime and Drug Enforcement Agency into Police Scotland, the band's name was changed from the Fife Constabulary Pipe Band to the Police Scotland Fife Pipe Band.

In 2018, the Police Scotland Fife Pipe Band celebrated its 10th anniversary as a band with a concert hosted by Bucksburn & District Pipe Band in the Beach Ballroom, Aberdeen which was named 'A Decade on the Beat'.

== Results ==
The band received its first placing in a Major championship when in 2011 it was placed 6th in the Scottish Pipe Band Championships.

In 2012 and 2013, the band was placed mid-table in most of the Major championships.

2018 has been the most successful season to date. The Band finished in the top 6 in all major championships, placed 6th at the Worlds with 3rd place in the MSR final and finished 5th in the Champions of Champions table for 2018.

== Pipe Majors ==
- James Murray (2007-2009)
- Andrew Mathieson (2009-2010)
- Douglas Murray (2010-2021)
- David Wilton (2021- )

== Leading Drummers ==
- Lee Innes (2007 - 2008)
- Mick O'Neill (2008- )

== Drum Majors ==
- Senior Drum Major Thomas Richard Lorenzen (Aug 2015 - )
- Drum Major Lauren Hanna (Nov 2022 - )
