= Procurator fiscal =

Public prosecutor in Scotland

A procurator fiscal (pl. procurators fiscal), sometimes called PF or fiscal (Scottish Gaelic: Neach-casaid a' Chrùin), is a public prosecutor in Scotland. The fiscal also investigates all sudden and suspicious deaths in Scotland (similar to a coroner in common law systems) and conducts fatal accident inquiries (a form of inquest unique to the Scottish legal system). They handle criminal complaints against the police (administrative complaints are handled by the Police Investigations and Review Commissioner).

Crimes and offences are reported to them by the Police or by specialist reporting agencies such as His Majesty's Revenue and Customs. For the majority of crimes in Scotland, the procurators fiscal present cases for the prosecution in the sheriff and justice of the peace courts (and formerly district courts), and the case for the defence is presented either by the accused, a solicitor, or an advocate. The solicitor will work for a firm of solicitors, or in certain areas of Scotland could be a public defender working for the Public Defence Solicitors' Office. A small number of crimes in Scotland are prosecuted instead in the High Court of Justiciary by an Advocate-Depute.

The procurator fiscal has the discretion not to prosecute and pursue alternatives free from political interference, but is always subject to the directions of the Crown Office and the Lord Advocate. They may offer accused persons an alternative to prosecution, such as a fiscal fine.

== Origins ==
The office most likely originates in the Roman-Dutch and French manorial or seignorial administrator (Dutch: procurator-fiscaal, French: procureur fiscal), who, as the fiscal in the title suggests, was originally an officer of the sheriff (the local law enforcement officer and judge) with financial (fiscal) responsibilities: the procurator fiscal collected debts, fines, and taxes.

A procurator-fiscal is a procurator or court representative connected with the fisc or Treasury, and hence with the collection of fines or dues. In official records, a king's procurator-fiscal is referred to in 1457. Such an officer appears to have emerged first in the ecclesiastical courts. In the St Andrew's Formulare of 1514, there is reference to an episcopal appointment of a man as procuratorem et advocatum nostrum fiscalem in all the bishop's causes, spiritual, civil and criminal, with wide powers; it contains a reference also to power which attaches ex officio procuratoris fiscalis. He was assigned the duty of seeking out and prosecuting delinquents and disobedient people. In the mid-16th century, Cardinal Beaton had two procurators-fiscal. At this stage, it appears clear that a procurator-fiscal was competent in civil, criminal and spiritual causes. These duties of looking for and then prosecuting people may be the forerunner of policing in Scotland, which was established very considerably later (in 1800). This may explain why, in Scotland, the police are under a legal obligation to comply with the directions of the procurator fiscal in matters concerning the investigation of crime, since the fiscal was himself once an investigator and so did the same job.

In the course of the 18th century, the duties of a procurator fiscal to collect taxes and other dues were eclipsed by his duty as prosecutor in the sheriff court with the passage of the Criminal Procedure Act 1701. In this capacity, procurators fiscal gave concurrence in private prosecutions and prosecuted on behalf of the Crown. The Sheriff Courts (Scotland) Act 1867 gave procurators fiscal full responsibility in law for prosecution of all criminal acts in Scotland.

Originally the fiscal was the sheriff's official and tenure of the office was at the pleasure of the sheriff. With the decline of private prosecution the fiscal came to be regarded more and more as under the control of the Lord Advocate. In 1776 the government started to pay procurators fiscal to take precognitions and in 1907 the right of appointing procurators fiscal was transferred to the Lord Advocate, and in 1927 procurators fiscal became full-time civil servants.

== Prosecution of crimes ==
Procurators fiscal make preliminary investigations into criminal cases, take written statements from witnesses (known as precognition) and are responsible for the investigation and prosecution of crime. This includes the power to direct the police in their investigation, (Note: Section 17(3) of the Police and Fire Reform (Scotland) Act 2012 requires the police to comply with any lawful instruction of the Lord Advocate or the procurator fiscal in relation to the investigation of offences) but except for serious crimes such as murder the police normally complete their enquiries before involving the procurator fiscal.

Under solemn High Court procedure, once someone has been charged with an offence and remanded in custody, the Crown must bring the case to a preliminary hearing within 110 days.

The procurator fiscal has never been obliged to prosecute and can choose the level at which to prosecute (either through solemn or summary procedure). The [accused] has no right to choose a jury trial, nor can a victim on their own decide to press charges, as the decision on whether to try by jury or summarily belongs to the prosecutor. There is a very exceptional mechanism however, called a bill for criminal letters, where a victim of a crime can petition the High Court of Justiciary for permission ('to pass the bill') to prosecute; akin to private prosecution in other jurisdictions. The last successful bill passed was in 1982 and previous to that, in 1909. Until 1987, the PF's discretion only extended to the degree to which they should prosecute, if at all; there were no alternatives to prosecution. The Criminal Justice (Scotland) Act 1987 gave procurators fiscal the power to offer fixed penalties instead of prosecution (a fiscal fine), at the time limited to a maximum of £25 and subsequently increased to £300.

Since then these options have expanded to giving a warning, fiscal fines, compensation orders, work orders, road traffic fixed penalties or diversion from prosecution into social work, psychological counselling or psychiatric treatment. Accused persons have the option of refusing the penalty offered and being prosecuted in court.

== Deaths ==
All suspicious, sudden and accidental deaths must be reported to the procurator fiscal, and they have a responsibility to identify if any criminal action has occurred and, where appropriate, prosecute. Where a criminal offence is suspected to have occurred the procurator fiscal will instruct the local police to investigate.

Fatal accidents can be subject to a fatal accident inquiry, a form of judicial inquiry akin to an inquest but conducted without a jury. Fatal accident inquiries are conducted in a sheriff court. An inquiry must be held for all deaths in custody and fatal accidents, with other accidental deaths subject to inquiry at the discretion of the procurator fiscal.

== Serious crimes ==
For the most serious crimes, the case will not be directly prosecuted by the procurator fiscal. Instead, the case will be heard at the High Court of Justiciary and the prosecution will be made in the name of the Lord Advocate by an Advocate Depute.

== Areas ==
There are eleven procurators fiscal in Scotland, each covering a geographical area or jurisdiction with a central office. Outside Strathclyde, these areas typically correspond with constabulary areas for the former territorial police forces in Scotland. They are (with areas in Strathclyde marked with an asterisk):

- Argyll and Clyde (in Paisley)*
- Ayrshire (in Kilmarnock)*
- Central (in Stirling)
- Dumfries and Galloway (in Dumfries)
- Fife (in Kirkcaldy)
- Glasgow and Strathkelvin (in Glasgow)*
- Grampian (in Aberdeen)
- Highlands and Islands (in Inverness)
- Lanarkshire (in Hamilton)*
- Lothian and Borders (in Edinburgh)
- Tayside (in Dundee)

== Court of the Lord Lyon ==
The coat of arms of the Procurator Fiscal to the Court of the Lord Lyon.

A procurator fiscal is appointed to the Court of the Lord Lyon, which is a civil and criminal court dealing with Scottish heraldry and genealogy in Scotland. This Court is unique to Scots culture, where heraldry plays an important role, particularly in relation to the clan system. Registration of a coat of arms requires a fee paid to the Crown, and the coat must adhere to specific rules concerning shape, colour, and imagery. The procurator fiscal was appointed under the Lyon King of Arms Act (1867) by the Lord Lyon, but since the Convention Rights (Compliance) (Scotland) Act (2001), by the Scottish Government.

If any rule concerning a coat of arms – also known as "an achievement" – is broken, the procurator fiscal, as the independent official prosecutor of the court, determines whether to initiate criminal proceedings.

== See also ==
- Lord Advocate's Reference
- Staatsanwaltschaft – the German State Prosecutor, who exercises a similar role
- Crown Prosecutor – equivalent in England and Wales
- Sutherland's Law – a 1970s drama series made by BBC Scotland
