= Inverness Constabulary =

Inverness Constabulary was a police force in Scotland that covered Inverness-shire.

It was created on 16 November 1968, as a merger of the Inverness Burgh Police and the Inverness-shire Constabulary. Inverness Constabulary merged with the Northern Constabulary and the Ross and Sutherland Constabulary on 16 May 1975, as part of the creation of the regions of Scotland. The resulting force was also called the Northern Constabulary.

The force's only Chief Constable was Andrew L. McClure, who had previously been Chief Constable of Inverness-shire Constabulary, and then went on to become Assistant Chief Constable of the new force.

Thomas Sorley had been Chief Constable of Inverness Burgh Police, and he was appointed Deputy Chief Constable of Inverness Constabulary. He was appointed Deputy Chief Constable of the new Northern Constabulary on its formation.
