= Inverness-shire Constabulary =

Police force of Inverness-shire, Scotland

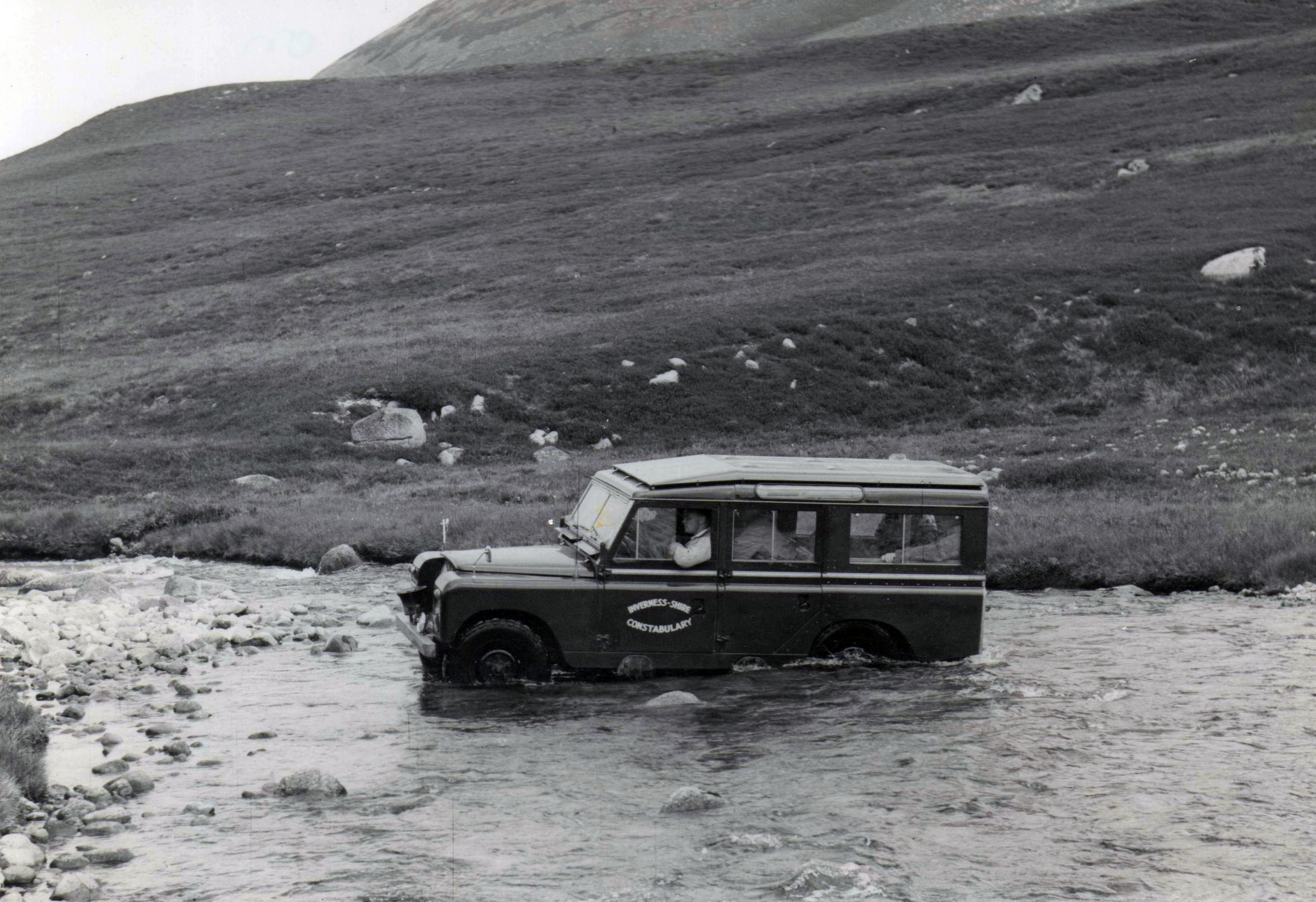
Mountain rescue vehicle

The Inverness-shire Constabulary, also called the Inverness County Police, was the police force of the county of Inverness-shire in Scotland.

The force was established in 1840. On 16 November 1968 the Constabulary merged with Inverness Burgh Police to form Inverness Constabulary, which in turn became part of the Northern Constabulary in 1975, which was in turn succeeded by Police Scotland in 2013.

== Organisation ==
The county was divided into four divisions, which would remain the same for 128 years:

- Inverness
- Lochaber (headquarters in Fort William)
- Skye
- Long Island, covering all the islands in the Outer Hebrides (North Uist, South Uist, Benbecula, Barra, and Harris) except Lewis, which was within Ross-shire

The force was originally commanded by a Superintendent, who also headed the Inverness Division. The other divisions were commanded by Sub Inspectors. These officers were renamed the Chief Constable and Inspectors respectively in 1857.

There were originally nine constables in the Inverness division, three in Lochaber, one in Skye, and two in Long Island, for a force of only nineteen men.

Between 1841 and 1847 the force also policed the Royal Burgh of Inverness, absorbing for that period the Town Officers and Watchmen of the Burgh, until the Inverness Burgh Police was set up as a separate force.

Throughout the existence of the Force, its headquarters were in Inverness Castle, an exclave of Inverness-shire within the boundaries of the Royal Burgh of Inverness.

== Chief Officers ==
- Eyre John Powell, 16 October 1840–24 August 1841
- John MacBean, 24 October 1841–31 May 1857
- William Murray, 1 June 1857–24 October 1882
- Donald Aitchison (acting), 25 October 1882–1 December 1882
- Alexander McHardy, 2 December 1882–30 April 1911
- Hugh MacLennan (acting), 1 May 1911–1 June 1911
- Major Alexander C. MacLean, 2 June 1911–2 June 1936
- Ewen MacDonald (acting), 3 June 1936–30 November 1936
- William Fraser, 1 December 1936–17 August 1951
- John R. Johnstone, 18 August 1951–28 May 1962
- James A. MacIntyre (acting), 29 May 1962–22 June 1963
- Andrew L. McClure, 23 June 1963–15 November 1968
