= Scottish Police Authority =

- Ùghdarras Poilis na h-Alba
- Logo of the Scottish Police Authority

Agency overview
- Formed: 1 April 2013; 13 years ago
- Type: Police Authority
- Jurisdiction: Scotland
- Headquarters: Pacific Quay, Glasgow
- Minister responsible: Neil Gray, Cabinet Secretary for Justice
- Agency executives: Martyn Evans, Chair; Lynn Brown, Chief Executive
- Parent department: Scottish Government
- Website: www.spa.police.uk

Map
- Scotland in the UK and Europe

The Scottish Police Authority (SPA), (Scottish Gaelic: Ùghdarras Poilis na h-Alba), is a public body of the Scottish Government which holds Police Scotland, the national police service, to account. Both bodies were established on 1 April 2013, following an announcement on 8 September 2011 in which the Scottish Government confirmed that a single police service would be created to replace the existing eight forces, the Scottish Crime and Drug Enforcement Agency, and the Scottish Police Services Authority.

After a further consultation on the detailed operation of the police service, the Police and Fire Reform (Scotland) Bill was published on 17 January 2012. After scrutiny and debate by the Scottish Parliament, the legislation was approved on 27 June 2012. It received royal assent in August.

One of the key provisions of the legislation includes clear responsibilities for the chief constable and, to ensure continued separation from ministers, a new Scottish Police Authority with 11 to 15 members and a remit to hold the chief constable to account.

The Scottish Police Authority is responsible for maintaining the police service. It is accountable to ministers and Parliament and it is supported by a senior officer and a small staff team to help it perform its role. Its functions are:

- Allocate resources
- Hold the chief constable to account for all his/her functions, including operational policing
- Appoint senior officers and staff
- Require information and reports from the chief constable if necessary – though the chief constable can appeal to ministers if of the view that it might prejudice an operation or the prosecution of offenders
- Prepare and publish a strategic plan and an annual plan setting out objectives, and arrangements for achieving those objectives
- Prepare and publish annual reports assessing progress against objectives
- Establish and maintain forensic services – separate from the chief constable's direct line of command

== See also ==
- His Majesty's Inspectorate of Constabulary in Scotland
