= Protection from Abuse (Scotland) Act 2001 =

- Act of the Scottish Parliament
- Scottish Parliament
- Long title: An Act of the Scottish Parliament to enable a power of arrest to be attached to interdicts granted to protect individuals from abuse; to regulate the consequences of such attachment; and for connected purposes.
- Citation: 2001 asp 14

Dates
- Royal assent: 6 November 2001
- Commencement: 6 February 2002
Other legislation
Amends	Matrimonial Homes (Family Protection) (Scotland) Act 1981
Amended by	Family Law (Scotland) Act 2006

Status: Amended

Text of statute as originally enacted

Text of the Protection from Abuse (Scotland) Act 2001 as in force today (including any amendments) within the United Kingdom, from legislation.gov.uk.

The Protection from Abuse (Scotland) Act 2001 (asp 14) is an act of the Scottish Parliament. It was passed on 4 October 2001, receiving royal assent on 6 November.

== Background and legislation ==
In January 2000, following the devolution of the Scottish Parliament the previous year, Justice Minister Jim Wallace announced proposals to reform family law in Scotland, which would include new legislation on domestic abuse. Plans to increase protection for victims of domestic violence were temporarily delayed but the Protection from Abuse (Scotland) bill was published in June 2001 and was subsequently passed by the parliament on 4 October. The act received Royal Assent on 6 November.

The act allows interdicts to be brought against abusers by their victims and gives the police the power to arrest and charge an individual who breaks such an interdict. By giving the police this new power, the act amends the Matrimonial Homes (Family Protection) (Scotland) Act 1981. The 2001 act was intended to extend protection to victims of domestic abuse by unmarried and same-sex partners, as well as those no longer in a relationship with their abuser.

== See also ==
- List of acts of the Scottish Parliament from 1999
- List of statutory instruments of Scotland, 2001
