= Ross and Sutherland Constabulary =

Scottish police force from 1963 to 1975

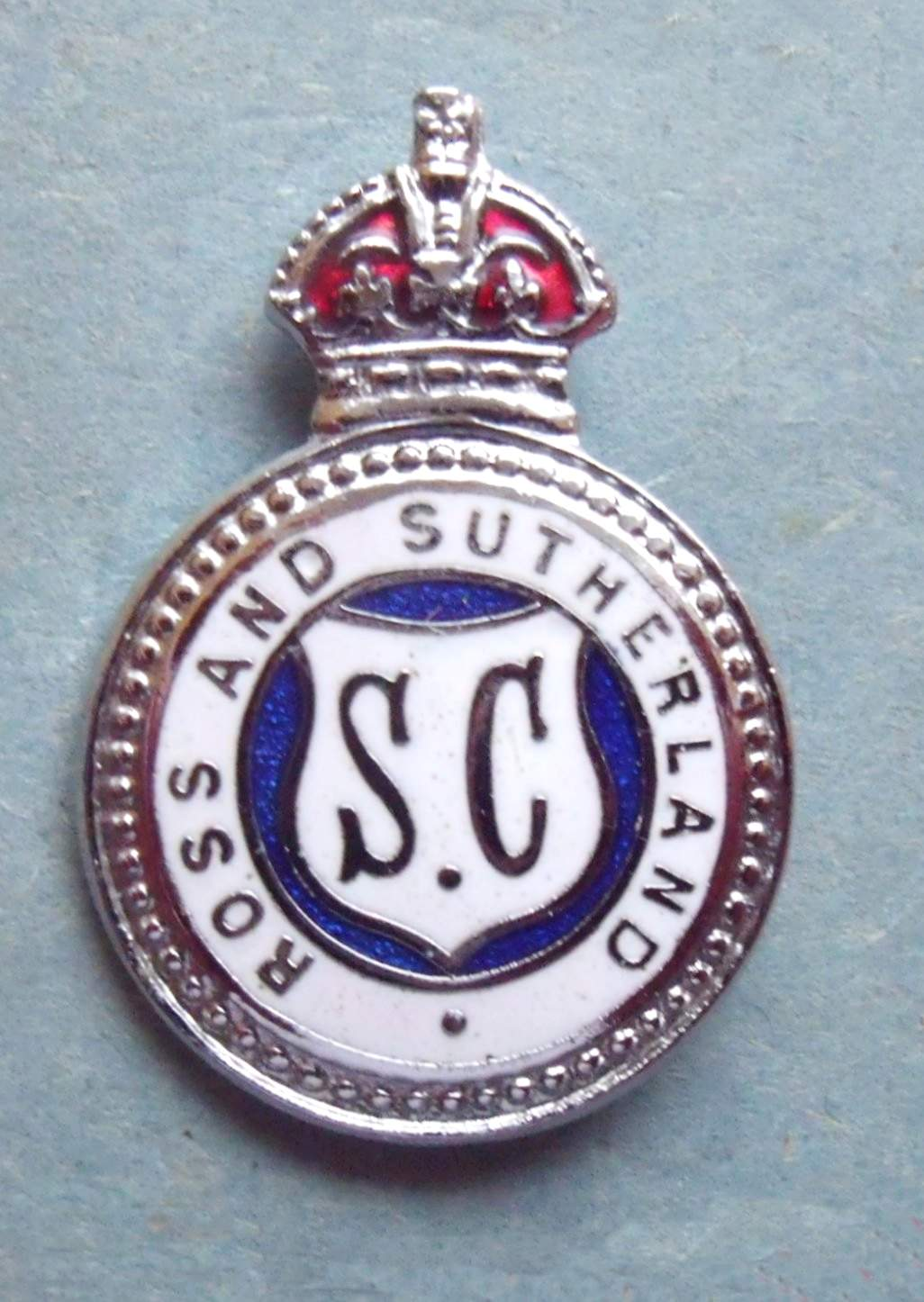
Cap badge

The Ross and Sutherland Constabulary was a police force in Scotland that existed between 16 May 1963 and 16 May 1975. Kenneth Ross was the chief constable of the force for its entire existence.

== History ==
On 11 March 1963, a special meeting of county councillors at Brora unanimously agreed to merge the Sutherland and Ross-shire police forces. The Ross and Sutherland Constabulary was formed on 16 May 1963.

Kenneth Ross was a native of Sutherland but who had served in the Renfrew & Bute Constabulary until his appointment as Chief Constable of Sutherland in 1962. Ross remained Chief Constable of the force, until it merged with the other Police forces of the Scottish Highlands & islands on 16 May 1975 to form the Northern Constabulary. On amalgamation, Ross became an Assistant Chief Constable of the new Force with particular responsibility for Mountain Rescue matters.

The force wore the Scottish Constabulary crest (Semper Vigilo) cap badge throughout its existence, and the force was identified by the chromed metal insignia R&S on rails worn on the epaulettes of constables and sergeants above the officer's collar number.
