= List of acts of the Scottish Parliament from 2001 =

This is a list of acts of the Scottish Parliament passed in 2001. Acts of the Scottish Parliament are enacted by the Scottish Parliament, which has legislative authority over devolved matters in relation to Scotland under the authority of the Scotland Act 1998.

Acts are cited by calendar year, in the same fashion as acts of Parliament of the United Kingdom. Each act passed in a respective year is numbered consecutively with Arabic numerals, following the prefix "asp".

15 acts of the Scottish Parliament were passed in 2001.

indicates that an act has been transcribed on Wikisource, indicates that an act is available to view at legislation.gov.uk, and indicates the location of the original act in the Parliamentary Archives.

== Acts of the Scottish Parliament ==
Short title	Citation	Royal assent
Long title
Abolition of Poindings and Warrant Sales Act 2001	2001 asp 1	17 January 2001
An Act of the Scottish Parliament to abolish poindings and warrant sales.
Transport (Scotland) Act 2001	2001 asp 2	25 January 2001
An Act of the Scottish Parliament to make provision about transport; to make provision as respects certain bridges; to amend section 21 of the Chronically Sick and Disabled Persons Act 1970; (Note: Chronically Sick and Disabled Persons Act 1970 (c. 44)) to amend section 40 of the Road Traffic Act 1988; (Note: Road Traffic Act 1988 (c. 52)) to amend sections 26, 28 and 63 of the Road Traffic Regulation Act 1984; (Note: Road Traffic Regulation Act 1984 (c. 27)) and for connected purposes.
Salmon Conservation (Scotland) Act 2001 (repealed)	2001 asp 3	14 February 2001
An Act of the Scottish Parliament to make further provision about the conservation of salmon and sea trout. (Repealed by Salmon and Freshwater Fisheries (Consolidation) (Scotland) Act 2003 (asp 15))
Budget (Scotland) Act 2001	2001 asp 4	15 March 2001
An Act of the Scottish Parliament to make provision, for financial year 2001/02, for the use of resources by the Scottish Administration and certain bodies whose expenditure is payable out of the Scottish Consolidated Fund, for authorising the payment of sums out of the Fund, for the maximum amount of relevant expenditure for the purposes of section 94(5) of the Local Government (Scotland) Act 1973 (Note: Local Government (Scotland) Act 1973 (c. 65)) (c.65) and the maximum amounts of borrowing by certain statutory bodies; to make provision, for financial year 2002/03, for authorising the payment of sums out of the Fund on a temporary basis; and for connected purposes.
Leasehold Casualties (Scotland) Act 2001	2001 asp 5	12 April 2001
An Act of the Scottish Parliament to provide for the extinction of leasehold casualties; for the payment of compensation on their extinction; for irritancy provisions in certain leases of land to be void; for the disapplication, in relation to certain leases, of the rule of law entitling a landlord in certain circumstances to terminate a lease; and for connected purposes.
Education (Graduate Endowment and Student Support) (Scotland) Act 2001	2001 asp 6	3 May 2001
An Act of the Scottish Parliament to make provision for the payment by certain persons of the graduate endowment; to make provision in relation to the use of income arising from the graduate endowment for the purposes of the financial support of students; to make further provision as respects financial support for students; and to make provision exempting students from liability for council tax.
Convention Rights (Compliance) (Scotland) Act 2001	2001 asp 7	5 July 2001
An Act of the Scottish Parliament to amend certain enactments relating to the sentencing and release of life prisoners, the constitution and powers of the Parole Board, legal advice and assistance and legal aid, homosexual offences and the appointment and removal of the procurator fiscal of the Lyon Court which are or may be incompatible with the European Convention on Human Rights; and to enable further changes in the law where it is or may be incompatible with the Convention.
Regulation of Care (Scotland) Act 2001	2001 asp 8	5 July 2001
An Act of the Scottish Parliament to establish the Scottish Commission for the Regulation of Care and the Scottish Social Services Council; to make provision for the registration and regulation of care services and for the registration, regulation and training of social service workers; to enable local authorities to make grants in respect of activities relating to child care and family support and to make direct payments to children in respect of certain care services; to enable the Scottish Ministers to delegate a power to make certain grants and loans for social work; to make further provision as respects payments by local authorities towards maintenance of certain children residing with and being cared for by persons other than their parents; to enable local authorities to provide and maintain residential accommodation in which nursing is provided; to make further provision as respects persons who have been looked after by local authorities; to amend the definition of "place of safety" in the Children (Scotland) Act 1995; (Note: Children (Scotland) Act 1995 (c. 36)) to make further provision as respects the appointment for children of curators ad litem, reporting officers and safeguarders; and for connected purposes.
Scottish Local Authorities (Tendering) Act 2001	2001 asp 9	6 July 2001
An Act of the Scottish Parliament to remove the time limit on the period during which the provisions about competition in the Local Government Act 1988 (Note: Local Government Act 1988 (c. 9)) may be modified in relation to local authorities.
Housing (Scotland) Act 2001	2001 asp 10	18 July 2001
An Act of the Scottish Parliament to make provision about housing, including provision about homelessness and the allocation of housing accommodation by social landlords, the tenants of social landlords, the regulation of social landlords, Scottish Homes, the strategic housing functions of the Scottish Ministers and local authorities and grants for improvement and repairs; and for connected purposes.
Mortgage Rights (Scotland) Act 2001	2001 asp 11	25 July 2001
An Act of the Scottish Parliament to provide for the suspension in certain circumstances of enforcement rights of a creditor in a standard security over property used for residential purposes and the continuation of proceedings relating to those rights; to make provision for notifying tenants and other occupiers of enforcement action by a creditor in a standard security; and for connected purposes.
Erskine Bridge Tolls Act 2001	2001 asp 12	13 September 2001
An Act of the Scottish Parliament to restore, with retrospective effect (other than as regards criminal liability), the power to levy tolls conferred by section 1(1) of the Erskine Bridge Tolls Act 1968; (Note: Erskine Bridge Tolls Act 1968 (c. 4)) and for connected purposes.
International Criminal Court (Scotland) Act 2001	2001 asp 13	24 September 2001
An Act of the Scottish Parliament to make provision for offences under the law of Scotland corresponding to offences within the jurisdiction of the International Criminal Court; to enable assistance to be provided to that court in relation to investigations and prosecutions; to make provision in relation to the enforcement of sentences and orders of that court; and for connected purposes.
Protection from Abuse (Scotland) Act 2001	2001 asp 14	6 November 2001
An Act of the Scottish Parliament to enable a power of arrest to be attached to interdicts granted to protect individuals from abuse; to regulate the consequences of such attachment; and for connected purposes.
Police and Fire Services (Finance) (Scotland) Act 2001	2001 asp 15	5 December 2001
An Act of the Scottish Parliament to make provision about the carrying forward by police authorities, joint police boards and joint fire boards of unspent balances from one financial year to the next; and for connected purposes.

== See also ==
- List of acts of the Scottish Parliament
