= Argyll and Clyde =

Area of operations for one of Scotland's Procurators Fiscal

Argyll and Clyde is a present area of operations for one of Scotland's Procurators Fiscal.

It is also a former health board area. It consists of Argyll and Bute, Inverclyde, Renfrewshire, western West Dunbartonshire, and western East Renfrewshire.
