= Police and Fire Services (Finance) (Scotland) Act 2001 =

- Act of the Scottish Parliament
- Scottish Parliament
- Long title: An Act of the Scottish Parliament to make provision about the carrying forward by police authorities, joint police boards and joint fire boards of unspent balances from one financial year to the next; and for connected purposes.
- Citation: 2001 asp 15
- Territorial extent: Scotland

Dates
- Royal assent: 5 December 2001

Other legislation
- Repealed by: Police and Fire Reform (Scotland) Act 2012
- Relates to: Police (Scotland) Act 1967; Fire Services Act 1947

Status: Repealed

Text of the Police and Fire Services (Finance) (Scotland) Act 2001 as in force today (including any amendments) within the United Kingdom, from legislation.gov.uk.

The Police and Fire Services (Finance) (Scotland) Act 2001 (asp 15) is an act of the Scottish Parliament concerning the finances of police services and fire and rescue services.

== Provisions ==
The act allows police services and fire and rescue services to carry over their budget to the next year.

== Reception ==
The Association of Chief Police Officers in Scotland and the Chief Fire Officers' Association both criticised the legislation, because it would increase bureaucracy and uncertainty due to a ministerial veto, in their view.
