= Association of Chief Police Officers in Scotland =

The Association of Chief Police Officers in Scotland (ACPOS) was the professional voice of police leadership (Chief Constables, Deputy Chief Constables and Assistant Chief Constables) in Scotland, including the Assistant Chief Constable in the British Transport Police responsible for Scotland. Some superintendents and senior support staff were also involved in its business. Along with all eight Scottish regional police forces and the Scottish Crime and Drug Enforcement Agency, ACPOS was merged into Police Scotland and ceased to operate on 1 April 2013.

Formerly a staff association, in 2006 it was incorporated as a private company limited by guarantee and gained charitable status in 2009. ACPOS evolved to be the strategic body which oversaw and co-ordinated all aspects of the direction and development of policing in Scotland. It commented upon police reform, published policies, campaigned on issues of importance, and worked in partnership with central and local government to set strategic objectives and deliver better integrated services for Scotland's communities.

== See also ==
- Scottish Police Services Authority
- The Association of Chief Police Officers of England, Wales and Northern Ireland
