= Fiscal fine =

A fiscal fine (formally a fixed penalty conditional offer) is a form of deferred prosecution agreement in Scotland issued by a procurator fiscal for certain summary offences as an alternative to prosecution. Alternatives to prosecution are called direct measures in Scotland.

Fiscal fines can vary between £50 and £500, but a compensation offer may be issued either separately or additionally with similar effect but with payment going to the victim of crime: these can be of any amount not exceeding £5,000. Whilst not being recorded as a conviction or formal admission of guilt, the payment of a fiscal fine can be revealed in certain circumstances, including a requirement by the General Medical Council for disclosure. The power to issue fiscal fines is conferred by section 302 of the Criminal Procedure (Scotland) Act 1995 as amended by section 50 of the Criminal Proceedings etc. (Reform) (Scotland) Act 2007.

== Background ==
Fiscal fines were introduced in Scotland by section 56 of the Criminal Justice (Scotland) Act 1987, following recommendations made by the Stewart Committee in Keeping Offenders Out of Court: Further Alternatives to Prosecution (published in 1982). Under the 1987 Act the fiscal fine was fixed at £25, which was changed by the Criminal Procedure (Scotland) Act 1995 to four levels of £25, £50, £75 and £100, and the maximum fine was increased following the McInnes Report from Sheriff Principal John McInnes. The maximum fine was subsequently increased to £300 by section 50 of the Criminal Proceedings etc. (Reform) (Scotland) Act 2007. The 2007 Act also modified the system from one where the offender had to accept a fiscal fine as an alternative fine, to one in which the offender was determined to have accepted fine if they did not object (an "opt-out" system.) The move to an opt-out system was another recommendation of the McInnes report.

== Criticism ==
The Scotsman newspaper reported in 2008 that fiscal fines were being used to deal with violent and serious crimes, contrary to previous assurances from the Crown Office The Inspectorate of Prosecution examined the use of fiscal fines in 2009 and found that most fiscal fines for assault were dealt with appropriately. The Crown Office responded by rejecting any claims that some sex offenders were offered fiscal fines instead of facing prosecution.

In the four years leading up to September 2013 showed that 189,256 fiscal fines had seen warning letters issued for non-payment.

The enforcement regime was also criticised in 2017 in the Scottish Parliament when figures revealed 45% of fiscal fines issued remained unpaid.
