= Metropolitan Police Committee =

Committee which advised the Home Secretary

The Metropolitan Police Committee was an ad hoc committee which advised the Home Secretary, between existed between 1995 and 2000, in exercising their functions as police authority for the Metropolitan Police.

== Establishment ==
The Metropolitan Police Committee was established by Michael Howard, as Home Secretary, in 1995.

== Work ==
The purpose of the Metropolitan Police Committee was to advise the Home Secretary in their work as the police authority, as an alternative to the model of the police authority being a local authority committee, as was the case in the rest of England and Wales. The committee advised the Home Secretary on their priorities for the Metropolitan Police.

The committee also provided advice on approving the costed annual plan for policing, and on monitoring performance, to the Home Secretary.

The committee participated in HM Inspectorate of Constabulary inspections.

== Membership ==
In total, there were 11 members of the committee. The chair of the committee was John Quinton.

There were no councillors on the committee, when it was first established in 1995, which was criticised by the Association of London Authorities.

== Disestablishment ==
The Stephen Lawrence Inquiry recommended the establishment of the Metropolitan Police Authority as a body for scrutinising the policies of the Metropolitan Police. The Metropolitan Police Authority was established under the Greater London Authority Act 1999 and replaced the committee.
