= Scottish Police Services Authority =

- SPSA Logo
- Abbreviation: SPSA
- Formation: 1 April 2007
- Dissolved: 1 April 2013
- Type: Scottish Police Support Services
- Legal status: Merged to Police Scotland
- Purpose: Provide National Support to the Scottish Police Services
- Headquarters: Glasgow
- Region served: Scotland
- Chief Executive: Andrea Quinn
- Parent organization: Scottish Government
- Website: spsa.police.uk

The Scottish Police Services Authority (SPSA) was a public body of the Scottish Government responsible for certain central services for police forces in Scotland.

It was established on 1 April 2007, following the passing of the Police, Public Order and Criminal Justice (Scotland) Act 2006. The SPSA assumed responsibility for the Scottish Police College, the Scottish Drug Enforcement Agency, the Scottish Criminal Records Office and the Scottish Police Information Strategy. The authority also controlled central Police services such as Forensics and IT.

With effect from 1 April 2013, the structure of policing in Scotland changed. The eight regional forces, plus the Scottish Crime and Drug Enforcement Agency and the Scottish Police Services Authority, were replaced by the new Police Scotland which is overseen by the Scottish Police Authority.

== See also ==
- Serious Organised Crime Agency
