= Police, Public Order and Criminal Justice (Scotland) Act 2006 =

Act of the Scottish Parliament

Police, Public Order and Criminal Justice (Scotland) Act 2006 (Note: Section 105.)
- Act of the Scottish Parliament
- Scottish Parliament
- Long title: An Act of the Scottish Parliament to make further provision about the police; to make further provision about public order and safety; to make further provision about criminal justice; and for connected purposes.
- Citation: 2006 asp 10
- Territorial extent: Scotland

Dates
- Royal assent: 4 July 2006
- Commencement: various (Note: Section 104.)

Other legislation
- Amends: Sea Fisheries (Shellfish) Act 1967; Civic Government (Scotland) Act 1982; Criminal Justice Act 1988; Criminal Law (Consolidation) (Scotland) Act 1995; Criminal Procedure (Scotland) Act 1995; Police Act 1996; Fireworks Act 2003; Sexual Offences Act 2003
- Amended by: Police and Fire Reform (Scotland) Act 2012; Crime and Courts Act 2013; Inquiries into Fatal Accidents and Sudden Deaths etc. (Scotland) Act 2016

Status: Amended

Text of statute as originally enacted

Revised text of statute as amended

Text of the Police, Public Order and Criminal Justice (Scotland) Act 2006 as in force today (including any amendments) within the United Kingdom, from legislation.gov.uk.

The Police, Public Order and Criminal Justice (Scotland) Act 2006 (asp 10) is an act of the Scottish Parliament.

== Provisions ==
The act increased the age for buying a knife to 18.

The act also increased the maximum sentence for carrying a knife from 2 years to 4 years.

The act enabled police to maintain a database of DNA of people who were accused of sexual or violent offences.

The act allowed for the mandatory drug testing of prisoners.

The act established the Scottish Crime and Drug Enforcement Agency.
