= Tulliallan Castle =

Country house in Fife, Scotland

Coordinates: 56.07472°N 3.71254°W

Designations

Inventory of Gardens and Designed Landscapes in Scotland
- Official name: Tulliallan
- Designated: 30 June 1987
- Reference no.: GDL00379

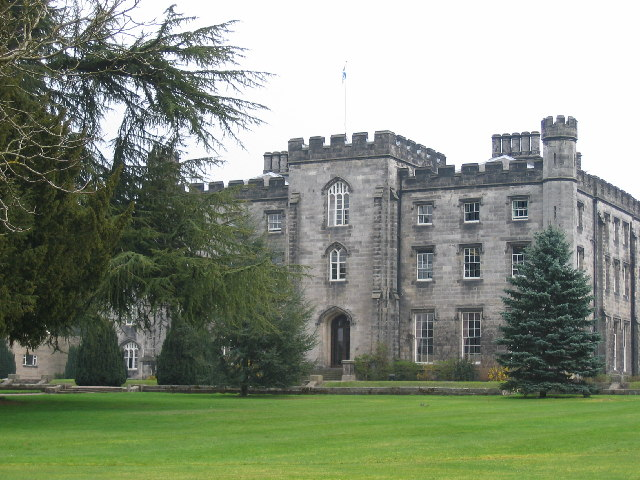
Tulliallan Castle

Tulliallan Castle is a large house in Kincardine, Fife, Scotland. It is the second structure to have the name, and is a mixture of Gothic and Italian style architecture set amid some 90 acres (36 hectares) of parkland just north of where the Kincardine Bridge spans the Firth of Forth. It has been the home of the Scottish Police College since 1954. On 1 April 2013, Tulliallan Castle became the headquarters of Police Scotland (the newly created national police service for Scotland), but in 2014 the service's headquarters temporarily relocated to nearby Stirling in the former Central Scotland Police HQ.

== 14th-century castle ==
An earlier structure about 1/2 mile (800 metres) northwest, Old Tulliallan Castle, was built by 1304, when it was ordered to be strengthened by Edward I of England, it then passed into the ownership of William Douglas, 1st Earl of Douglas, and was granted by the Douglases to the Edmonstones, and thence to a junior branch of the Blackadders, and finally to the Bruces of Carnock. A fortified house with a keep and rib-vaulted ground floor, it was abandoned in the seventeenth century.

== 19th-century castle ==
The castle was built in 1812–1820 for Admiral Lord Keith, one time senior officer of Lord Nelson, paid for with prize money. The labour force said to include French prisoners of war.

During the Second World War it was used by the Polish Armed Forces in the West as their headquarters in Scotland.

Prior to the Second World War there was no central training for police officers in Scotland. After the war it was decided to centralise all police training and Tulliallan was the result. Tulliallan, from the Gaelic Tulach-Aluin ('beautiful knoll') was purchased in 1950 by the then Scottish Home Department for £9,100. The building was modernised and renovated and the first courses for inspectors and sergeants began in 1954. Over the years the site has been heavily modified to provide accommodation, catering, training, and teaching facilities for the Scottish Police College.

The building is now used as the administrative head of the Scottish Police College and also serves as the official residence of the Chief Constable of Police Scotland.

The building is sometimes colloquially known as "Castle Grayskull" by serving and retired officers in relation to the castle in the He Man fictional series.
