= Tulliallan =

Former estate in Perthshire, Scotland

Coordinates: 56.079794°N 3.725706°W

Tulliallan: Scottish Gaelic: Tulach Àlainn
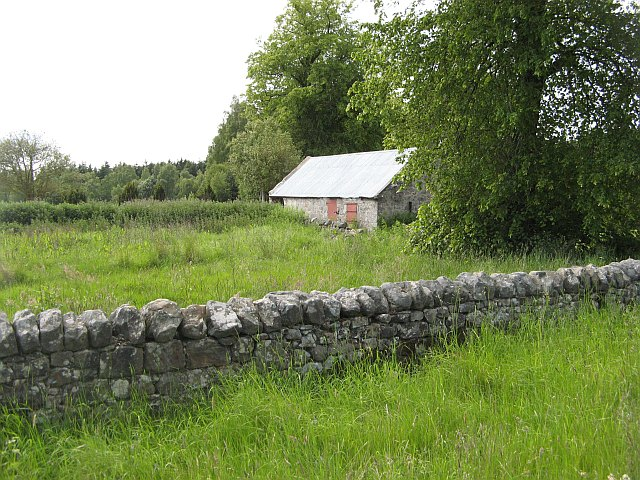
- Building in fields in Devilla Forest. Most of the land here is wooded, and has been for many years. The forest was shown as Tulliallan Forest on older maps.

- Location within Scotland Tulliallan (Scotland)
- Lieutenancy area: Fife
- Country: Scotland
- Sovereign state: United Kingdom
- Post town: Kincardine
- Police: Scotland
- Fire: Scottish
- Ambulance: Scottish
- UK Parliament: Dunfermline and West Fife
- Scottish Parliament: Dunfermline

Tulliallan (Gaelic Tulach Àlainn, 'Beautiful knoll') was an estate in Perthshire, Scotland, near to Kincardine, and a parish. The Blackadder lairds of Tulliallan, a branch of the Blackadder border clan, wielded considerable power in the 15th and 16th centuries. The modern Tulliallan Castle is relatively recent, built in 1812–1820 and now the home of the Scottish Police College.

== Parish ==
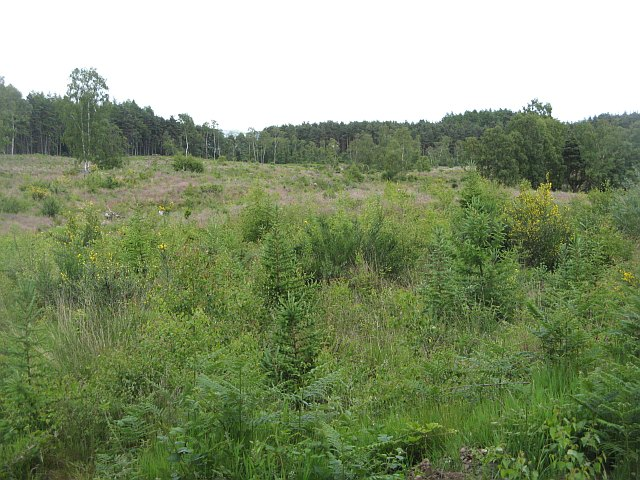
Felled and replanted area, Devilla Forest Known as Tulliallan Forest on older maps, Devilla is a long established forest on undulating, sometimes marshy ground.

The original parish of Tulliallan covered only the barony of Tulliallan. In 1673 it was extended to include the barony of Kincardine and the lands of Lurg, Sands and Kellywood, formerly included in the neighbouring Culross parish. For many years the parishes of Culross and Tulliallan formed an exclave some miles away from the rest of Perthshire, on the boundaries of Clackmannanshire and Fife. Culross and Tulliallan were transferred to Fife based on the recommendations of the boundary commission appointed under the Local Government (Scotland) Act 1889.

The parish is bounded on the west and north by Clackmannan, on the east by Culross and on the south by the River Forth. It is 3.75 miles (6.04 km) from north to south and 3 miles (4.8 km) from east to west, and contains 4,176 acres (1,690 ha). In 1885, 484 acres (196 ha) were foreshore and 106 acres (43 ha) water. The parish slopes gently southward to the Forth from a height of 324 feet (99 m). Between 1823 and 1839 a large area of land was recovered from the tidal waters of the Forth by two large embankments. The 1885 description said about 500 acres (200 ha) was wooded and almost all the rest cultivated. High-quality sandstone had been quarried near Longannet for many years. The land was also rich in coal and ironstone.

At the last census (2011), the population of the civil parish was 3,001. The area of the parish is 3,685 acres. Tulliallan parish is also a Community Council area under the name Kincardine, with some variations in the boundary with Culross, its neighbouring civil parish and community council to the east.

== Old castle ==
The first fortification at Tulliallan was built some time before 1304, when it was ordered to be strengthened by Edward I of England. The position was strategic, near the main ferry over the Forth, and in 1304 Edward I gave orders for the walls of "Tolyalwyn" to be strengthened. Presumably this would have included strengthening the D-shaped moat and the outer rampart, making the position strong against attack across the marshy land, which would not be drained until the 18th century. There would have been buildings within the enclosure, but the old castle was probably built later, by the Douglasses.

The Douglas castle was initially an L-shaped two-storey building of ashlar masonry, with a tower at the southwest corner holding the main entrance, which was reached by a drawbridge. Most of the ground floor had small, square windows, while there were large slits above. The interior was unusual in that there were important rooms on the ground floor. The ceilings of these rooms included ribbed vaults springing from octagonal piers. The house was extended in the fifteenth century, and a major reconstruction seems to have been undertaken in the late sixteenth century.

The castle was surrounded by a moat, which would have been filled by water from the Firth of Forth, which in the old days extended further inland. An 1853 account of the then-ruined building said "two narrow posterns open from each end of the southern front, of which that on the east opens into an apartment which has been termed the great hall, where three compartments are curiously formed by elegant groined arches, which rest upon a central octagonal column, the whole being in a state of remarkable preservation. In 1885 the old castle, although ruined, was still described as an imposing-looking edifice.

== History ==
The castle passed into the ownership of William Douglas, 1st Earl of Douglas (c. 1327–1384). Archibald Douglas, 4th Earl of Douglas gifted the Tulliallan estate to the Edmiston family in 1402. In 1456 the gift was confirmed to Sir James Edmiston, great-grandson of King Robert II of Scotland, by royal charter. Patrick Blackader, grandson of Cuthbert Blackader of Blackader Castle in Berwickshire, married Elizabeth Edmiston, daughter of Sir James. She brought the Tulliallan estate as her dowry.

A noted member of the Blackadder family of Tulliallan was Robert Blackadder, brother of Patrick Blackadder, Laird of Tulliallan. Robert Blackadder was Bishop of Aberdeen, Bishop of Glasgow from 1484 and then in 1492 the first Archbishop of Glasgow, who added the eponymous crypt and aisle in Glasgow Cathedral. The bishop sided with rebel nobles who defeated and killed King James III of Scotland in 1488 at the Battle of Sauchieburn. The archbishop died while on a pilgrimage to the Holy Land in 1508.

One of the Lairds of Tulliallan, Sir John Blackadder, was beheaded in March 1531 for the murder of James Inglis, Abbot of Culross, in a dispute over land. He was succeeded at Tulliallan by his brother Patrick, who renewed a dispute against the Homes for the Blackadder family lands around Allanton in Berwickshire. Patrick was murdered in an ambush near Edinburgh, where he was to meet the Homes to try to resolve their differences. Following this the Blackadders made no further attempts to recover their ancestral estates. William Blackadder was among the supporters of Mary, Queen of Scots at the Battle of Carberry Hill (15 June 1567). He was arrested soon after and hanged in June, and his brother was hanged in September.

The last Blackadder to own Tulliallan was Sir John, born in 1596 and on 18 July 1626 created a knight baronet of Nova Scotia by King Charles I of England. His estate, with lime works, salt pans and other enterprises, yielded an income of 36,000 merks annually, but this was not enough to satisfy Sir John's expensive habits and he ran up debts far beyond his ability to pay. When his effects were seized he fled to the continent, and in 1642 seems to have been in the French service. He died in America in 1651. Sir John's wife, Elizabeth Graham, was the daughter of the Earl of Menteith. She had an annuity of 360 merks, and lived at Tulliallan until 1662. His son, Alexander, could not free the estate from the burden of debts that his father had contracted. The Court of Session ordered a judicial sale. In 1700 the estate was purchased by Colonel John Erskine, son of David Erskine, 4th Lord Cardross.

The celebrated covenanting preacher John Blackadder (1622-1685) was legally the heir to the Blackadder baronetcy, but did not claim the title.

== Later years ==
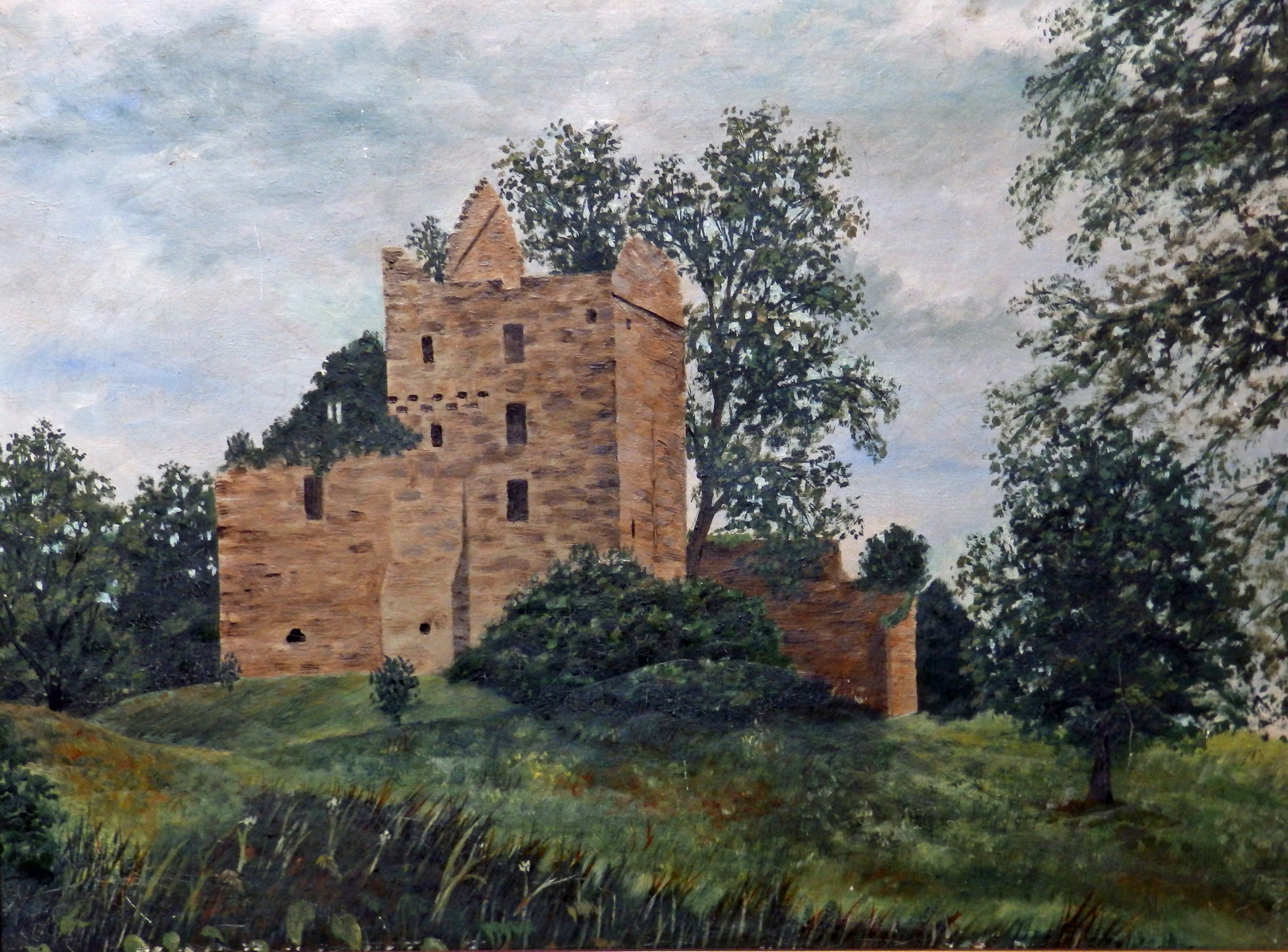
Painting from 1920s by local school's headmaster. Looking at north-facing side. In ownership of contributor's family.

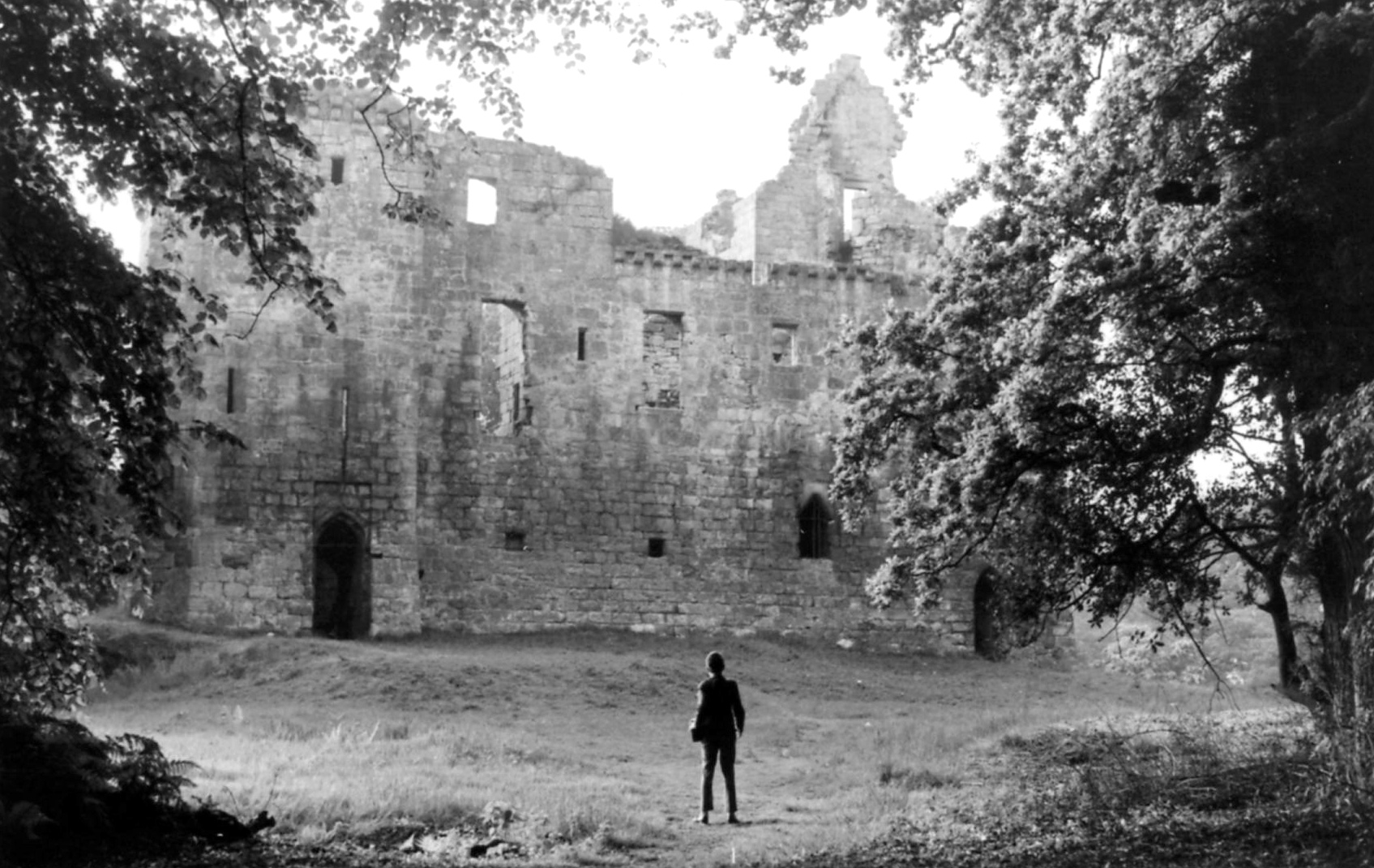
Photograph looking at south-facing wall. Origin unknown but taken c.1950s.

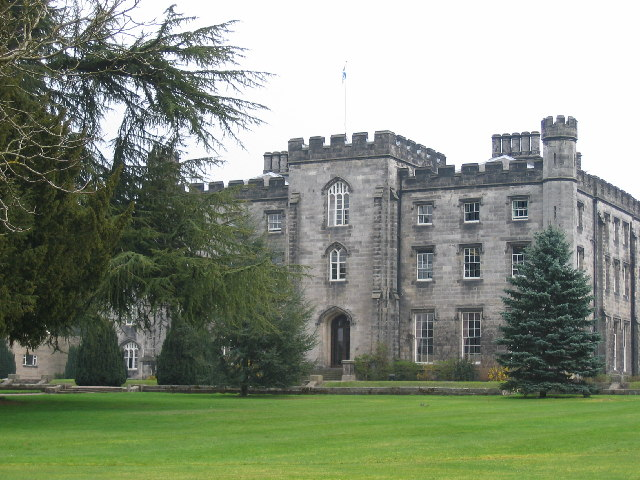
The modern Tulliallan Castle, now a police college

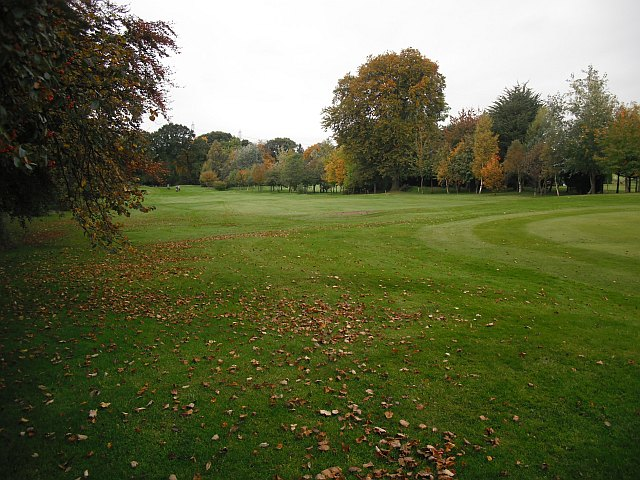
Tulliallan Golf Club. Looking up a fairway which runs parallel to the A977

The last occupant of the old castle was Colonel Erskine, known locally as the "Black Colonel", who died in the 1790s. George Elphinstone, 1st Viscount Keith bought the estate in 1799, and built today's castle as his family residence. The roof of the old castle was removed and it was allowed to crumble into ruins. An ancient bronze kettle was dug out of these ruins, about 8.5 inches (22 cm) in diameter and 5 inches (13 cm) high. Legend says that it formerly hung from one of the bosses of the castle roof, filled with gold. As long as it hung there, the castle would stand and the Blackadders of Tulliallan would prosper.

The modern-day Tulliallan Castle is about a half mile to the southeast of the old castle, built in 1818-1820 for Lord Viscount Keith. The building was acquired by the Mitchell family in 1924. During the World War II it was the headquarters of the Polish Armed Forces in the West. It has been the home of the Scottish Police College since 1954 and was the temporary headquarters of Police Scotland upon its creation in 2013.

== Sources ==
- Anderson, William (1877). The Scottish nation: or, The surnames, families, literature, honours, and biographical history of the people of Scotland. Vol. 1. A. Fullarton & co.
- Beveridge, David; Dalgleish, John James (1885). Culross and Tulliallan: or, Perthshire on Forth. Vol. 1. W. Blackwood and sons.
- Gifford, John (1988). Fife. Yale University Press. ISBN 0-300-09673-9.
- Groome, Francis Hindes (1885). Ordnance gazetteer of Scotland: a survey of Scottish topography, statistical, biographical and historical. Vol. 6. T. C. Jack.
- Lothian, James (1862). The banks of the Forth: a descriptive and historical sketch ... J. Lothian.
- MacRobert, A. E. (2002). Mary Queen of Scots and the casket letters. I.B.Tauris. ISBN 1-86064-829-0.
- "Rev. John Blackadder, Prisoner of the Bass". Notes and queries. Oxford University Press. 1883. p. 50.
- Rogers, Charles (1853). A week at Bridge of Allan. Adam and Charles Black. p. 209.
- "Seal and brief history of Robert Blackadder". The Glasgow Story.
- "Tulliallan Castle (Scottish Police College), Tulliallan". British Listed Buildings.
