= Inverness Burgh Police =

The Inverness Burgh Police was the police force responsible for the Royal Burgh of Inverness, Scotland from 1847 until 1968.

== History ==
Although law enforcement of a kind had been present in the Royal Burgh of Inverness since time immemorial, by 1827 the Inverness Courier complained of the lack of an efficient police. The Town Council from then on made use of the services of the Town Serjeants to enforce the law. In 1843 there was one Serjeant in overall charge and two more who patrolled the town during the day. A body of six watchmen patrolled the burgh at night.

In 1840 the County of Inverness-shire (excluding the burgh) set up its own police, the Inverness-shire Constabulary, and in 1841 Inverness's Town Officers became part of the Inverness-shire force. The County Superintendent took overall command of the joint organisation and Town Serjeant Alexander Grant became Sub-Inspector for the Inverness District (including Inverness Burgh), with additional watchmen being appointed for the Burgh and Landward area.

This arrangement existed until 1847, when the Royal Burgh set up its own police force, authority to do so being contained in a local act of parliament.

The first Superintendent of Inverness Burgh Police was David Anderson, appointed on 4 September 1847. The force merged again with Inverness-shire Constabulary on 16 November 1968 to form the Inverness Constabulary.

== Chief Officers ==
The Chief Officer was called the Superintendent until 1892, when he was renamed the chief constable.

- Alexander Grant (Town Serjeant), ?–2 May 1841
- Eyre John Powell (Superintendent, Inverness-shire Constabulary), 3 May 1841–24 August 1841
- John MacBean (Superintendent, Inverness-shire Constabulary), 24 August 1841–1 May 1847
- David Anderson, 4 September 1847–3 May 1854
- John Sutherland, 31 July 1854–13 May 1872
- Thomas Wyness, 16 June 1872–8 January 1880
- John MacDonald, 25 February 1880–30 April 1908
- John MacNaughton, 4 June 1908–31 December 1935
- Alexander Neville, 26 January 1936–19 October 1942
- William J. Dalgleish (acting), 1 May 1942–10 January 1943
- James Stewart, 11 January 1943–10 August 1946
- Andrew Meldrum, 11 August 1946–16 May 1949 (acting, 7 August 1944–10 August 1946)
- William Paterson, 15 March 1950–18 August 1962 (acting 16 May 1949–14 March 1950)
- Alasdair MacBean (acting), 19 August 1962–3 February 1963
- Thomas Sorley, 4 February 1963–15 November 1968

William Paterson was the only member of the force to rise through the ranks within the force to Chief Constable.
