= Scottish Crime and Drug Enforcement Agency =

Agency overview
- Formed: 2001
- Dissolved: 2013
- Superseding agency: Police Scotland

Jurisdictional structure
- National agency: Scotland
- Operations jurisdiction: Scotland

Operational structure
- Headquarters: Paisley
- Agency executive: Gordon Meldrum, Director

The Scottish Crime and Drug Enforcement Agency (SCDEA) was a special police force of Scotland responsible for disrupting and dismantling serious organised crime groups.

The Scottish Drug Enforcement Agency (SDEA) was established on 1 April 2001, becoming the SCDEA in 2006 and was incorporated into Police Scotland on 1 April 2013. The Police, Public Order and Criminal Justice (Scotland) Act 2006 put the SDEA on a statutory footing and renamed it as the Scottish Crime and Drug Enforcement Agency, funded through the Scottish Police Services Authority.

Despite its title, it was formally not a police agency but a police force, whose officers are constables having the same powers as their territorial counterparts. It worked alongside other Scottish police forces and was answerable to the Scottish Government through the Scottish Police Services Authority. The Director of the agency was responsible to Scottish Ministers and the Scottish Parliament for financial and administrative matters. Some functions were shared with the Home Office Serious Organised Crime Agency (SOCA), but SOCA required permission from the SCDEA or the Lord Advocate to conduct certain operations.

An Act of the Scottish Parliament, the Police and Fire Reform (Scotland) Act 2012, created a single Police Service of Scotland – to be known as Police Scotland – with effect from 1 April 2013. This merged the eight regional police forces in Scotland, together with the Scottish Crime and Drug Enforcement Agency, into a single service covering the whole of Scotland. Police Scotland has its headquarters at the Scottish Police College at Tulliallan in Fife.

The SCDEA was headed by a Director General and Deputy Director General, who as members of the Association of Chief Police Officers in Scotland formed the core of the Policy Group (the Executive of the SCDEA.)

== Units ==
The SCDEA had created several units and officials responsible for expanding its role in preventing serious crime in Scotland:

- Drugs Strategy Unit
- Scottish Money Laundering Unit
- Scottish Witness Protection Unit
- e-crime Unit (Scotland)

== See also ==
- Crown Office and Procurator Fiscal Service
- Serious Organised Crime Agency
- HM Revenue and Customs
- Police Intelligence
