= Police and Fire Reform (Scotland) Act 2012 =

Act of the Scottish Parliament

Police and Fire Reform (Scotland) Act 2012 (Note: Section 130.)
- Act of the Scottish Parliament
- Scottish Parliament
- Long title: An Act of the Scottish Parliament to make provision about policing; to make provision about fire and rescue services; and for connected purposes.
- Citation: 2012 asp 8
- Introduced by: Kenny MacAskill, Cabinet Secretary for Justice
- Territorial extent: Scotland

Dates
- Royal assent: 7 August 2012
- Commencement: various (Note: Section 129.)

Other legislation
- Amends: Gas Act 1965; Local Government (Scotland) Act 1973; Water (Scotland) Act 1980; Law Reform (Miscellaneous Provisions) (Scotland) Act 1980; Zoo Licensing Act 1981; Criminal Procedure (Scotland) Act 1995; Police Act 1996; Scottish Public Services Ombudsman Act 2002
- Repeals/revokes: Police (Scotland) Act 1967; Police and Fire Services (Finance) (Scotland) Act 2001
- Amended by: Children and Young Persons (Scotland) Act 1937

Status: Amended

Text of statute as originally enacted

Revised text of statute as amended

Text of the Police and Fire Reform (Scotland) Act 2012 as in force today (including any amendments) within the United Kingdom, from legislation.gov.uk.

The Police and Fire Reform (Scotland) Act 2012 (asp 8) is an act of the Scottish Parliament.

== Provisions ==
This legislation merged the eight separate police forces and fire and rescue services in Scotland, plus several central agencies, into single agencies covering the whole of Scotland. These new agencies, Police Scotland and the Scottish Fire and Rescue Service, formally came into being on 1 April 2013.

By establishing the Scottish Police Authority and the Police Service of Scotland, it replaced the arrangements previously set out in the Police (Scotland) Act 1967.

The legislation also made provision for the Auditor General for Scotland to become responsible for auditing the Scottish Police Authority, and the Scottish Fire and Rescue Service.

== Further developments ==
The UK Government decided to make Police Scotland and the Scottish Fire and Rescue Service ineligible for VAT refunds on the basis that they were not local organisations, but were national organisations.

In 2018, a Scottish Parliament committee reviewed the effect of the act.

== See also ==
- Police and Fire Services (Finance) (Scotland) Act 2001
- Fire (Scotland) Act 2005
