= Police Scotland =

Police service of Scotland

Police Scotland Poileas Alba (Scottish Gaelic)
- Motto: Semper Vigilo (Note: 'Always Vigilant' in English.); Keeping People Safe

Agency overview
- Formed: 1 April 2013; 13 years ago
- Preceding agency: 10; Central Scotland Police; Dumfries and Galloway Constabulary; Fife Constabulary; Grampian Police; Lothian and Borders Police; Northern Constabulary; Strathclyde Police; Tayside Police; Scottish Police Services Authority; Scottish Crime and Drug Enforcement Agency
- Employees: 22,198
- Volunteers: 409 Special Constables; More than 1,000 youth volunteers
- Annual budget: £1.278 billion (2023/24)
- Legal personality: Police force

Jurisdictional structure
- Operations jurisdiction: Scotland
- Police Scotland's jurisdiction
- Area: 30,414 sq mi (78,772 km^{2})
- Population: 5,479,900 (mid-2021)
- Governing body: Scottish Police Authority
- Constituting instrument: Police and Fire Reform (Scotland) Act 2012
- General nature: Civilian police

Operational structure
- Overseen by: Scottish Police Authority
- Headquarters: Tulliallan Castle, Kincardine-on-Forth
- Police officers: 16,363 (regular); 409 (volunteer)
- Others: 5,836 (staff)
- Cabinet secretary responsible: Neil Gray, Cabinet Secretary for Justice
- Agency executives: Joanna Farrell, Chief Constable; Alan Speirs, Deputy Chief Constable – Professionalism; Jane Connors, Deputy Chief Constable – Local Policing; Bex Smith, Deputy Chief Constable – Operational Support
- Parent agency: Scottish Government
- Divisions: 13

Facilities
- Stations: 214
- Airbases: Glasgow City Heliport
- Vehicles: 3,800 (1,540 marked)
- Helicopters: 1 (1 reserve; Eurocopter EC135)

Website
- www.scotland.police.uk

Police Scotland (Scottish Gaelic: Poileas Alba), formally the Police Service of Scotland (Seirbheis Phoilis na h-Alba), is the territorial police force responsible for law enforcement and crime prevention in Scotland. It was formed in 2013, through the merging of eight regional police forces in Scotland, as well as the specialist services of the Scottish Police Services Authority, including the Scottish Crime and Drug Enforcement Agency. Although not formally absorbing it, the merger also resulted in the winding down of the Association of Chief Police Officers in Scotland.

Police Scotland is the second-largest territorial police force in the United Kingdom (after the Metropolitan Police) in terms of officer numbers, and the largest territorial force in terms of its geographic area of responsibility. The chief constable is answerable to the Scottish Police Authority, and the force is inspected by His Majesty's Inspectorate of Constabulary in Scotland.

Scotland is also policed by the Ministry of Defence Police, British Transport Police, and the Civil Nuclear Constabulary within their respective jurisdictions. Both the Metropolitan Police and National Crime Agency also have some jurisdiction in Scotland. In regard to the Metropolitan Police this is due to their national responsibilities for the protection of the Royal Family and other prominent persons, such as the prime minister, and for counter-terrorism.

== History ==
=== Prior to merger ===
After a consultation process, the Scottish Government confirmed on 8 September 2011 that a single police service would be created in Scotland. The Scottish Government stated that "reform will safeguard frontline policing in communities by creating designated local senior officers for every council area with a statutory duty to work with councils to shape local services. Establishing a single service aims to ensure more equal access to national and specialist services and expertise such as major investigation teams and firearms teams, whenever and wherever they are needed." The Police and Fire Reform (Scotland) Bill was published in January 2012 and was approved on 27 June 2012 after scrutiny in the Scottish Parliament. The bill received royal assent as the Police and Fire Reform (Scotland) Act 2012. In September 2012, chief constable Stephen House of Strathclyde Police was announced as the future first chief constable of Police Scotland. He was sworn into the post on 1 October 2012. The first chair of the Scottish Police Authority, Vic Emery (then the convener of the Scottish Police Services Authority), was appointed in August 2012.

As the date of formation approached, it was widely reported that the new chief constable and the Scottish Police Authority were in disagreement over the control of backroom staff.

Police Scotland officially came into being on 1 April 2013 under the Police and Fire Reform (Scotland) Act 2012, merging the following police forces around Scotland:

- Central Scotland Police
- Dumfries and Galloway Constabulary
- Fife Constabulary
- Grampian Police
- Lothian and Borders Police
- Northern Constabulary
- Strathclyde Police
- Tayside Police

This merger also included the:

- Scottish Police Services Authority, including the Scottish Crime and Drug Enforcement Agency

=== Since merger ===
In June 2014, a leaked Police Scotland internal email to police managers in Dunfermline ordered a substantial increase in stop and search activities and warned any police officers not meeting the higher targets would be subjected to a performance development review. Police Scotland has previously denied setting stop and search performance targets for individual officers. The next month, it was revealed that between April and December 2013, Police Scotland's officers stopped and searched members of the Scottish public at a rate of 979.6 per 10,000 people, a rate three times higher than that of the Metropolitan Police and nine times higher than that of the New York Police Department. It was also revealed that the Scottish Police Authority, the body tasked with overseeing Police Scotland, had removed criticism of the force's use of stop and search powers from a report it had commissioned. Also removed from the report were calls for a review of stop and search on children and for clarification of the policy's primary aim.

In October 2013, Police Scotland announced proposals to close 65 out of 215 police station public counters and reduce opening hours at others. The force cited a drop in the number of people visiting public counters and the development of new ways for the public to contact the police, including the 101 telephone number and contact points which connect callers at police stations directly to officers, as reasons for the proposed closures. The plans were condemned by some opposition MSPs. In November 2016, it emerged that 58 further stations could close as part of an estates review.

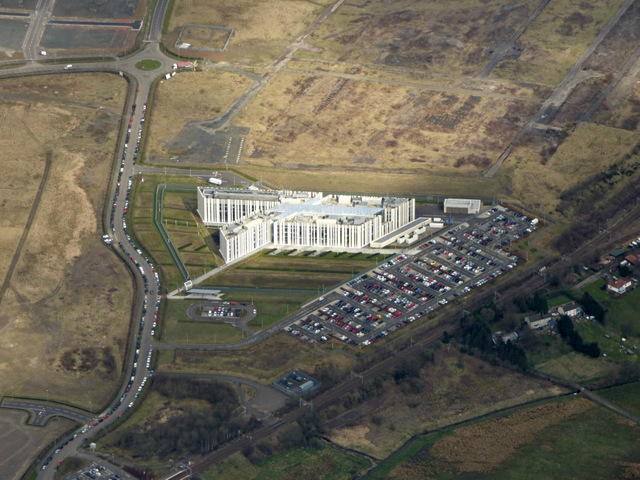
Scottish Crime Campus, Gartcosh

In 2014, the Scottish Crime Campus in Gartcosh was opened. This £73 million secure facility houses several specialist investigative and analytical departments of the police including forensic services, and is also the base for other law enforcement-related agencies such as the Crown Office and Procurator Fiscal Service, HM Revenue and Customs and the National Crime Agency. Police Scotland was responsible for the security of the 2014 Commonwealth Games.

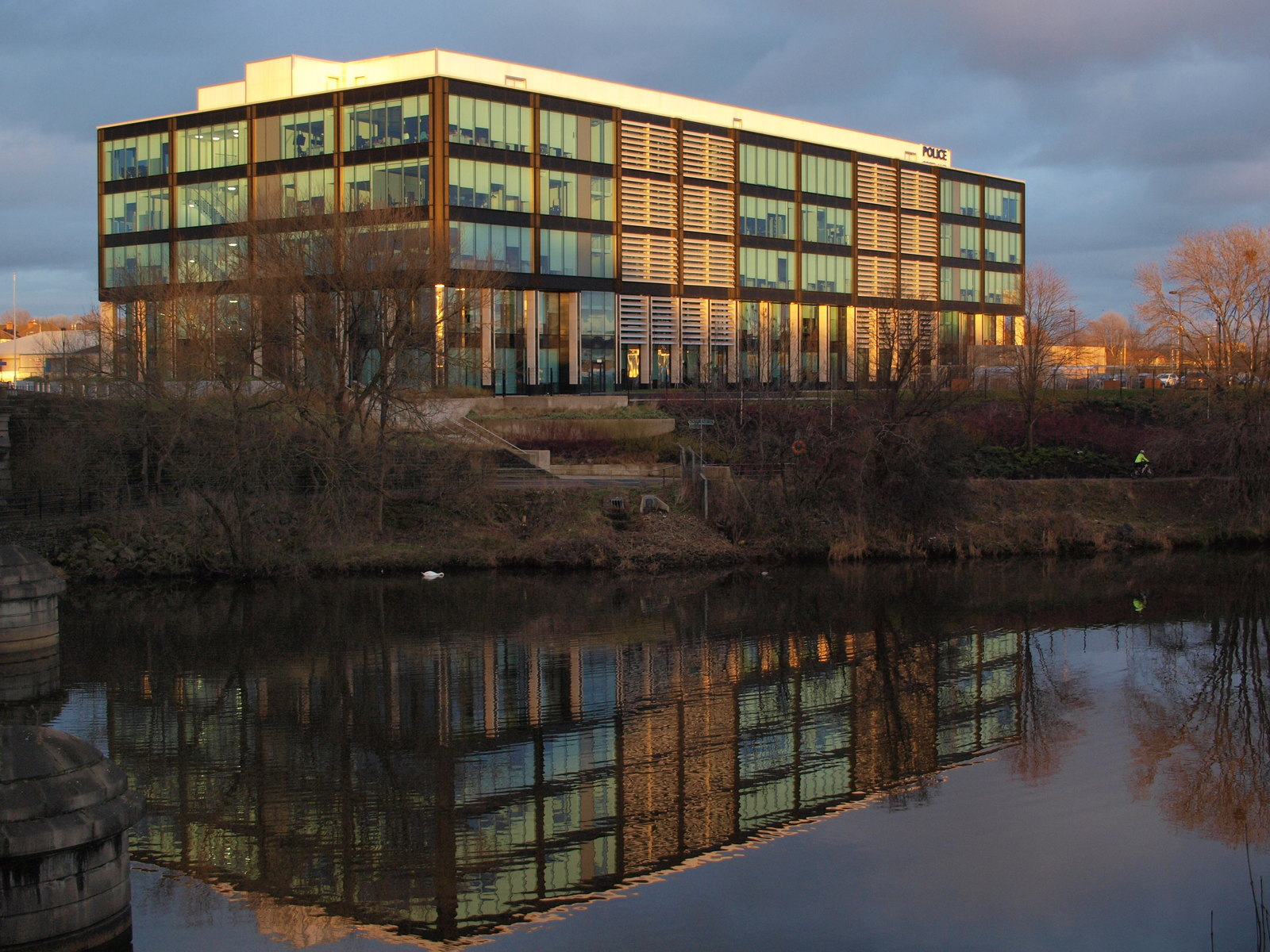
New administrative headquarters on the River Clyde at Dalmarnock, Glasgow

In 2015, the former Strathclyde Police headquarters in Pitt Street, central Glasgow were closed and the officers based there transferred to a new £24 million office in the Dalmarnock district of the city, although some operational functions, such as the control room for Ayrshire and Renfrewshire, moved to the regional communications facility in Govan.

In 2021, it was confirmed that the premises in Fettes, Edinburgh (adjacent to Broughton High School and formerly the headquarters of Lothian & Borders Police) was considered to be obsolete, and the high-value site including playing fields would be sold off, with the remaining policing functions relocated in and around the city. In 2023 (the year before the 50th anniversary of the complex), hazardous RAAC concrete was found to be present, accelerating the process of vacating the buildings. By 2025 it was reported that this process was almost complete, but the near-empty building had yet to be sold or demolished.

==== Control rooms ====
In October 2013, it was announced that the number of police control rooms and call handling service centres in Scotland was under review, with the possibility of seven out of ten such offices closing. Control rooms considered for closure included Dumfries, Aberdeen and Inverness; the Dumfries control room closed in May 2014, with the workload absorbed by existing facilities in Glasgow and Motherwell. The facilities in Glenrothes and Stirling soon followed, with all their calls and dispatching moved to a single site for the east of Scotland at Bilston, Midlothian.

Closures in Aberdeen and Inverness (with control functionality moving to Dundee and call handling across the three sites in the Central Belt) were delayed until 2017 as a result of a Her Majesty's Inspectorate of Constabulary in Scotland (HMICS) review of the service, following a July 2015 incident in which two persons died after their vehicle had crashed off the M9 motorway; the matter had been reported to the police just after the crash but was not investigated further at the time as the call was not properly logged onto the computer systems due to inefficient interim procedures in place following the recent restructuring in the eastern region.

The Aberdeen control room and service centre closed in March 2017, and Inverness followed in February 2018, with staff at the latter location invited to re-train in a dedicated unit performing criminal record checks and other enquiries via the Police National Computer and related databases; this unit was to share work with an existing department in Govan, a proposal which local council leaders claimed was not what was originally presented to them during the consultation process. That department was formally launched in May 2018.

== Organisation ==
=== Executive team ===
As of August 2023, the force is led by an executive team that includes Chief Constable Jo Farrell, plus three deputy chief constables, a deputy chief officer and ten assistant chief constables. All force executive officers are based at Tulliallan Castle in Kincardine, Fife or Stirling Randolphfield.

=== Ranks ===
Police Scotland uses the same rank structure and insignia as other police forces in the United Kingdom.

- Chief constable
- Deputy chief constable
- Assistant chief constable
- Chief superintendent / Detective chief superintendent
- Superintendent / Detective superintendent
- Chief inspector / Detective chief inspector
- Inspector / Detective inspector
- Sergeant / Detective sergeant
- Constable / Detective constable
- Special constable

=== Local policing ===
Local policing in Scotland is overseen by a deputy chief constable. The country is divided geographically into 3 regions – North, East and West – each headed by an assistant chief constable. There are 13 divisions, each covering one or more local authority areas and headed by a chief superintendent. All divisional commanders are "people who came up through the ranks in that part of the country". Divisions are further split into Area Commands under chief inspectors. These are then managed by ward, under an inspector, mirroring the 353 wards used in local authority elections; every ward in Scotland has its own local policing team (response) and problem solving team (community).

==== Divisional structure ====
As of 2023, the divisional structure is as follows:

| Divisional identifier | Division name | Area Commands |
|---|---|---|
| L | Argyll and West Dunbartonshire | Cowal, Bute and Helensburgh |
| L | Argyll and West Dunbartonshire | Oban, Lorn and the Isles, Mid Argyll, Kintyre & Islands |
| L | Argyll and West Dunbartonshire | West Dunbartonshire |
| U | Ayrshire | East Ayrshire |
| U | Ayrshire | North Ayrshire |
| U | Ayrshire | South Ayrshire |
| V | Dumfries and Galloway | Dumfriesshire |
| V | Dumfries and Galloway | Galloway |
| E | Edinburgh | North East |
| E | Edinburgh | North West |
| E | Edinburgh | South East |
| E | Edinburgh | South West |
| P | Fife | Central Fife |
| P | Fife | East Fife |
| P | Fife | West Fife |
| C | Forth Valley | Clackmannanshire |
| C | Forth Valley | Falkirk |
| C | Forth Valley | Grangemouth |
| C | Forth Valley | Stirling |
| G | Greater Glasgow | East Dunbartonshire |
| G | Greater Glasgow | East Renfrewshire |
| G | Greater Glasgow | Glasgow City Centre |
| G | Greater Glasgow | Glasgow East |
| G | Greater Glasgow | Glasgow North |
| G | Greater Glasgow | Glasgow North West |
| G | Greater Glasgow | Glasgow South East |
| G | Greater Glasgow | Glasgow South West |
| N | Highlands and Islands | North Highland |
| N | Highlands and Islands | Inverness |
| N | Highlands and Islands | South Highland |
| N | Highlands and Islands | Orkney Islands |
| N | Highlands and Islands | Shetland Islands |
| N | Highlands and Islands | Western Isles |
| Q | Lanarkshire | East Kilbride, Cambuslang and Rutherglen |
| Q | Lanarkshire | Hamilton and Clydesdale |
| Q | Lanarkshire | Monklands and Cumbernauld |
| Q | Lanarkshire | Motherwell, Wishaw and Bellshill |
| A | North East | Aberdeen City North |
| A | North East | Aberdeen City South |
| A | North East | Aberdeenshire North |
| A | North East | Aberdeenshire South |
| A | North East | Moray |
| K | Renfrewshire and Inverclyde | Inverclyde |
| K | Renfrewshire and Inverclyde | Paisley |
| K | Renfrewshire and Inverclyde | Renfrew |
| D | Tayside | Angus |
| D | Tayside | Dundee |
| D | Tayside | Perth and Kinross |
| J | The Lothians and Scottish Borders | East Lothian |
| J | The Lothians and Scottish Borders | Midlothian |
| J | The Lothians and Scottish Borders | Scottish Borders |
| J | The Lothians and Scottish Borders | West Lothian |
| R | Criminal Justice & Services Division | Custody |

==== Officer numbers ====
As of March 2025:

West Command
| Regional resources | | 1,355 |
| Argyll & West Dunbartonshire | L Division | 533 |
| Ayrshire | U Division | 777 |
| Dumfries & Galloway | V Division | 363 |
| Greater Glasgow | G Division | 2,474 |
| Lanarkshire | Q Division | 1,360 |
| Renfrewshire & Inverclyde | K Division | 609 |
| Total | | 7,471 |
East Command
| Regional resources | | 787 |
| Edinburgh | E Division | 1,104 |
| Fife | P Division | 753 |
| Forth Valley | C Division | 618 |
| Lothians & Scottish Borders | J Division | 912 |
| Total | | 4,174 |
North Command
| Regional resources | | 584 |
| Highland & Islands | N Division | 1048 |
| North East | A Division | 668 |
| Tayside | D Division | 906 |
| Total | | 3,206 |
National resources
| Total | | 1,730 |
Total resources
| Total | | 16,611 |

- Examples of National Resources include: Specialist Crime Division: National Intelligence Bureau, Homicide Governance and Review, Prison Intelligence Unit, Human Trafficking Unit, National Rape Investigation, National Rape Review, Fugitive Unit and Scottish Protected Persons Unit, International Unit, HOLMES, Safer Communities Citizen Focus, Preventions and Interventions, and Strategic Partnerships. Operational Support: Scottish Police Information and Coordination Centre, Intelligence, Specialist Operations Training, Air Support, Dive/Marine Unit, Football Co-ordination Unit, Mounted Unit, Mountain Rescue, Motorcycle Unit. Custody: Area Command, Support
- Examples of Regional Resources include: Specialist Crime Division: Major Investigation Teams, Forensic Gateways, E – Crime, Financial Investigations, Serious and Organised Crime Units, Counter Terrorism Units, Offender Management, Border Policing Command, Technical Support Unit and Interventions. Operational Support: Road Policing Units, Event and Emergency Planning, VIP Planning, Armed Policing Training, Road Policing Management & Policy, Armed Policing, Dogs, Trunk Roads Policing Group and Operational Support Units. Custody: Regional Custody Teams. Contact, Command and Control: Area Control Rooms and Service Centres
- Local police officer resources are the core complement of officers under the direction of the Local Commander and include community policing, response policing and divisional road policing teams. Also included in the local resource figures are officers within the divisional Criminal Investigation Department and Public Protection Units.

=== Specialist Crime Division ===
The Specialist Crime Division (SCD) provides access to national investigative and intelligence resources for matters relating to major crime, organised crime, counter terrorism, intelligence, covert policing and public protection. SCD comprises more than 2000 officers and targets individuals that pose the most significant threat to communities.

==== Border Policing Command ====
Officers from Border Policing Command operate in the major airports in Scotland and undertake examinations and searches of passengers under the Terrorism Act 2000.

==== Special Branch ====
The Special Branch – note that "special branch" is not the official term used by Police Scotland – is a covert part of the service, which may consist of various units. The Special Branch's primary role is to gather intelligence on terrorist operations and all terrorist-related incidents, and when the branch obtains any intelligence they shall pass on the information to the security service (MI5) or the service / agency appropriate to the current situation. The Special Branch also gathers intelligence on political and animal rights extremist activity, and any environmental extremism. In addition the Special Branch provides personal protection to VIPs or certain individuals who may be vulnerable to potential terror attacks or other types of attacks. The Special Branch works very closely with the Secret Intelligence Service (MI6), the Security Service (MI5), and many other police forces in the UK.

==== Organised Crime and Counter Terrorism Unit ====
Police Scotland has limited responsibilities in relation to counter terrorism, with the Metropolitan Police being the main force behind counter terrorism operations throughout the UK. However, the SCD does have counter-terrorism in its remit, and relies on daily support from several UK agencies, including MI5 and the Office for Security and Counter-Terrorism at the Home Office.

==== Major Investigation Teams ====
Major Investigation Teams (MITs) are located throughout Scotland and are responsible for leading the investigation of all murder inquiries and large-scale and complex criminal investigations. Although each MIT will be responsible for investigating cases within its own area, where required they will be able to be deployed anywhere in the country to respond to need and demand.

==== National Anti Corruption Unit ====
The National Anti Corruption Unit is the first of its kind in UK policing and works in partnership with the public sector to prevent corruption in publicly funded organisations. The unit also offers a specialist investigative capability. The unit is split into two teams, one focused internally within Police Scotland whilst a second team focuses on other publicly funded organisations.

==== National Human Trafficking Unit ====
The existing Scottish Intelligence Coordination Unit and Strathclyde Police Vice and Trafficking Unit combined on 1 April 2013 to form the new National Human Trafficking Unit (NHTU).

==== National Rape Taskforce ====
The investigation of rape and other sexual offences is a key priority for Police Scotland. National Rape Taskforce units are located in Glasgow and Aberdeen and work alongside Divisional Rape Investigation Units. They provide a national investigative capacity and a case review function.

==== Prison Intelligence Unit ====
The Prison Intelligence Unit (PIU) provides an interface for the exchange of information and intelligence between Police Scotland and the Scottish Prison Service. The unit also develops and supports policy, procedure, planning, research, technology development, advice and communication between Police Scotland and the Scottish Prison Service.

=== Licensing and Violence Reduction Division ===
The Licensing and Violence Reduction Division (LVRD) contains a number of miscellaneous functions including the titular alcohol licensing and violence reduction teams.

One of the higher-profile units within the LVRD is the Domestic Abuse Task Force (DATF). The DATF has a presence in each of the command areas as DATF (West), DATF (East) and DATF (North). The DATF (North) is unique amongst the three in having sub-offices in N Division (Highlands and Islands), A Division (North-East) and D Division (Tayside). The DATF has national responsibility for pro-actively addressing domestic abuse. Its divisional equivalents are the Domestic Abuse Investigation Units.

Another unit within the division is the Force Flexible Policing Unit (FFPU, or "Flexi Teams" as they are known locally), based in all three command areas (North, East, West). This unit's primary function is to act upon specific geographical intelligence relating to spikes in crime trends (particularly involving violence, alcohol, antisocial behaviour or other high volume crime), and carrying out taskings in the form of high visibility patrols and public reassurance.

The City of Glasgow was one of the first in Scotland to successfully trial a specialist Violence Reduction Unit.

=== Operational Support Division ===
==== Roads policing ====
Policing of Scotland's roads network is the responsibility of the Roads Policing Unit. The unit is split into three areas, west, east and north which cover their respective Local Police Divisions. The departments aim is to achieve casualty reduction and wider operational objectives. There are roughly 500 road policing officers in Scotland; Chief Superintendent Louise Blakelock is currently the head of roads policing. The Collision Investigation function sits within Road Policing division. Unlike many other forces, there is no dedicated Collision Investigation Unit. Instead investigating serious and fatal RTCs lies with specially trained officers who carry out the role beside their core road patrol functions.

==== Operational Support Unit ====
Six operational support units (OSUs) have been established to provide specially skilled officers trained in over ground search, public order and chemical, biological, radiological and nuclear (CBRN) response. When not used in their specialist roles OSU officers are deployed in local communities focusing on issues as directed by demand. OSUs are based in Aberdeen, Inverness and Dundee (North), Edinburgh and Alloa (East) and Glasgow (West). Across the force area the OSU comprises a total of 6 Inspectors, 18 Sergeants and 172 Constables.

==== Armed Policing ====
Armed Policing provides Armed Response Vehicles (ARV), the Specialist Firearms Unit and Armed Policing Training.

Prior to the inception of Police Scotland, the routine tasking and visibility of ARV officers varied widely across Scotland with deployment models varying for matters such as if officers carried side arms with a standing authority or if they were secured in the vehicles. The operational functions and cover of the ARVs also varied including if they could be tasked for routine incidents and one legacy force did not have a regular ARV patrol. Police Scotland introduced ARV patrols in all 13 local policing divisions in Scotland with 275 dedicated officers. ARV officers carry a X26 or X2 Taser, a Glock 17 handgun and a Heckler & Koch G36 carbine. Former Chief Constable Sir Stephen House's founding policy decision was that ARV officers would be granted a standing authority to overtly carry their sidearm and, in addition, controversially allowed ARVs to be able to respond to routine incidents (non-firearms incidents) "to provide support to local policing through regular and tasked patrols". This policy was made without proper consultation provoking both political and public debate. In October 2014, the policy was changed so that an ARV can only be tasked to an incident involving firearms or a threat to life.

The Strategic Firearms Unit (formerly the Tactical Firearms Unit), which was inherited from Strathclyde Police, consists of Specialist Firearms Officers (SFO) and Counter Terrorist Specialist Firearms Officers (CTSFO), who form part of the United Kingdom CTSFO Network, and are equipped with the SIG MCX carbine.

In June 2016, it was announced there would be an additional 124 armed officers; of these, 90 officers would be dedicated to armed response vehicles and 34 would be trainers and specialist firearms officers, bringing the total number of armed officers to 365.

==== Dog Branch ====
The Dog Branch comprises 75 police dog handlers located throughout Scotland. Training has been centralised at the National Dog Training Centre in Glasgow.

==== Air Support Unit ====
The Air Support Unit consists of three Remotely Piloted Aircraft Systems (RPAS) teams based at Glasgow, Aberdeen and Inverness as well as one helicopter based at Glasgow City Heliport which is owned and operated by Babcock Mission Critical Services Onshore under contract. RPAS became operational in May 2019 at Aberdeen and Inverness due to the high amounts of search for persons incidents in the Grampian and Highlands Regions. The RPAS unit use two types of drones, being the DJI M210 and DJI Phantom. The drones are transported via 4x4 vehicles and are operated by two specially trained police officers. The RPAS unit is primarily used in urban areas at events as well as missing person searches, road traffic collisions (RTCs) and post incident investigations.

The helicopter element of the Air Support Unit was inherited from Strathclyde Police, the only police force in Scotland to possess such a unit at amalgamation in April 2013. The majority of calls the helicopter is tasked with are missing persons incidents; however, it also supports the likes of vehicle pursuits, command and control for events as well as mutual aid for other police services. The helicopter crew consists of one civilian pilot and two police officer observers. The Police Scotland and Strathclyde Police Air Support Units have suffered a total of three hull-loss accidents involving their aircraft, two of which resulted in fatalities.

- On 24 January 1990, a Bell 206 JetRanger G-EYEI, normally used by Radio Clyde and covering for unavailability of the police MBB Bo 105 (G-SPOL) helicopter crashed in Giffnock, Glasgow after suffering engine failure during a sudden, severe snow storm. The aircraft was not fitted with a "Snow Deflector Kit" and suffered from choking of the engine air intake, resulting in the engine failing. The aircraft hit a five-story building while attempting to land and crashed to the ground, causing the death of 32-year-old police observer Sergeant Malcolm Herd. The remaining three crew (two police officers and one pilot) survived the accident.
- On 19 February 2002, a Eurocopter EC135 T1 G-SPAU crashed in a field near Muirkirk in East Ayrshire while conducting a search for a possible missing child. The crew, comprising two police officer observers and one pilot escaped serious injury, but the aircraft was damaged beyond repair and scrapped. Accident investigators were unable to confirm a definitive cause for the accident, but issued two recommendations to improve safety.
- The 2013 Glasgow helicopter crash – 29 November 2013 – Police Scotland's only helicopter (a Eurocopter EC135, registration G-SPAO), crashed into The Clutha Vaults pub in Glasgow, killing ten people including all three crew.

Police Scotland had access to a loan helicopter (also a Eurocopter EC135, registration G-CPSH, formerly of the Chiltern Air Support Unit) from the National Police Air Service. This was removed from service with the formation of NPAS, due to budget cuts.

Police Scotland received their own, new H135 (renamed EC135) in early 2017, registered G-POLS. The aircraft continues to be leased from Babcock, who also still provide pilots, maintenance and support.

==== Dive & Marine Unit ====
Police Scotland has two full-time units skilled in both underwater search and marine capability are based in Greenock (one sergeant and 11 constables) and Aberdeen (dive supervisor and four constables), as well as number of non-dedicated divers are retained across the country to provide additional support. The dive and marine unit supports several kinds of operations such as missing persons, counter terrorism, evidence recovery event patrols, etc. utilising a range of vehicles and equipment. All Police Scotland divers are specially trained and must participate in an eight-week dive course in co-operation with other specialist units, all with a varied background in policing and experience.

The dive and marine unit boasts a diverse fleet of vehicles, including many varied high speed watercraft. In July 2020 Police Scotland in co-operation with Ultimate Boats, Police Scotland arranged a three-year contract to operate a purpose built fully recyclable high speed vessel. The boat can reach up to 50 knots (58 mph; 93 km/h) knots with a range of 400 nautical miles (460 mi; 740 km) and is based on the River Clyde in order to provide extra support to marine incidents. The vessel became operational in June 2022.

==== Mounted Branch ====
The mounted branches of Strathclyde Police and Lothian and Borders Police were merged prior to the formation of Police Scotland. The combined branch now provides mounted support throughout Scotland. The mounted branch is based in Stewarton, East Ayrshire, and has a strength of 22 horses.

==== Mountain Rescue ====
Police Scotland operate three mountain rescue teams (Grampian, Strathclyde & Tayside), which provide search and rescue capabilities to those in need. Police Scotland also holds responsibility for search and rescue provision across the nation, a responsibility it often delegates to mountain rescue or HM Coastguard.

=== Special Constabulary ===
Special constables are unpaid volunteers who have the same police powers as their full-time counterparts when on or off duty. They must spend a minimum of 96 hours per year on duty. Although they are unpaid a "Recognition Award Scheme", remodelled in 2016, awards a payment of £1,100 to special constables who achieve 180 hours' service in a 12-month period and have at least two years' previous police service.

Special constables undertake a standardised comprehensive training programme that normally runs over a course of at least eight weekends with one full week spent at Scottish Police College in Tulliallan. When on duty, they wear the same uniform as their regular counterparts. Special constables can be used in time of need, usually working alongside regular officers on community policing or emergency response teams and in the Specialist Crime and Operational Support Divisions e.g. Dog Unit and Roads Policing.

In response to the COVID-19 pandemic, at the request of Police Scotland, Special constables with the organisation increased their hours. Completing more than 90,000 duty hours from the months of March 2020 to April 2021, with A & D Division's each volunteering more than 10,000 hours.

==== Special constable numbers ====
From information received on 31 March 2021, Police Scotland had 461 special constables (SC), with 35 being listed as inactive, having not participated in active duty for six months or more; the total cohort of active special constables was 426. The total of 461 SCs represents a net reduction of 10% on 2020 figures, when the comparable figure was 511. Compared to 2014 figures, this represents a 100% net reduction. In the year to March 2021, 85 special constables left the Police Scotland Special Constabulary, 17 (20%) of whom transferred to the police service as regular police constables, the remaining 68 (80%) departing all together. In the same period 36 new special constables joined Police Scotland, a net loss of 50 between March 2020 and March 2021. There are growing concerns from some over the future prospects of Police Scotland's Special Constabulary if the number of SCs within the organisation continues to decline at the current rate. The number of special constables dropped further still, with the reported figure being 422 in 2022, this led to the matter being discussed by the then Justice Secretary Keith Brown in the Scottish Parliament. In December 2023, the number of special constables was revealed to have fallen further, to 409, with only 32 being trained during 2023.

Number of Police Scotland special constables 2014-2023
| 2014 | 2015 | 2016 | 2017 | 2018 | 2019 | 2020 | 2021 | 2022 | 2023 |
|---|---|---|---|---|---|---|---|---|---|
| 1,394 | 1,366 | 820 | 723 | 623 | 517 | 511 | 461 | 422 | 409 |

Table data source

== Chief constables ==
| No. | Name | From | To | Tenure length | Notes |
|---|---|---|---|---|---|
| 1 | Sir Stephen House | 1 October 2012 | 30 November 2015 | 3 years and 61 days | |
| – | Neil Richardson (interim) | 30 November 2015 | 5 January 2016 | 37 days | Interim chief constable |
| 2 | Phil Gormley | 5 January 2016 | 8 September 2017 | 1 year and 247 days | Officially resigned on 7 February 2018 after a period of paid leave. |
| – | Iain Livingstone (interim) | 8 September 2017 | 27 August 2018 | 354 days | Interim chief constable |
| 3 | Sir Iain Livingstone | 27 August 2018 | 10 August 2023 | 4 years and 349 days | |
| – | Fiona Taylor (interim) | 10 August 2023 | 9 October 2023 | 60 days | Interim chief constable |
| 4 | Jo Farrell | 9 October 2023 | Incumbent | 3 years and 37 days | |

== Officers killed in the line of duty ==
The Police Roll of Honour Trust and Police Memorial Trust list and commemorate all British police officers killed in the line of duty. Since its establishment in 1984, the Police Memorial Trust has erected 50 memorials nationally to some of those officers.

The following officers and staff of the Police Service of Scotland are listed by the Police Roll of Honour Trust as having died during the course of their duties:

- Police Constable Kirsty Nelis, 2013
- Police Constable Tony Collins, 2013
- Captain David Traill, 2013 (civilian pilot)
- Police Constable Mark Murtagh, 2014
- Police Constable Rhianydd Hitchcock, 2014
- Police Constable Douglas Wiggins, 2016
- Police Constable Roy Buggins, 2019

== Uniform and equipment ==
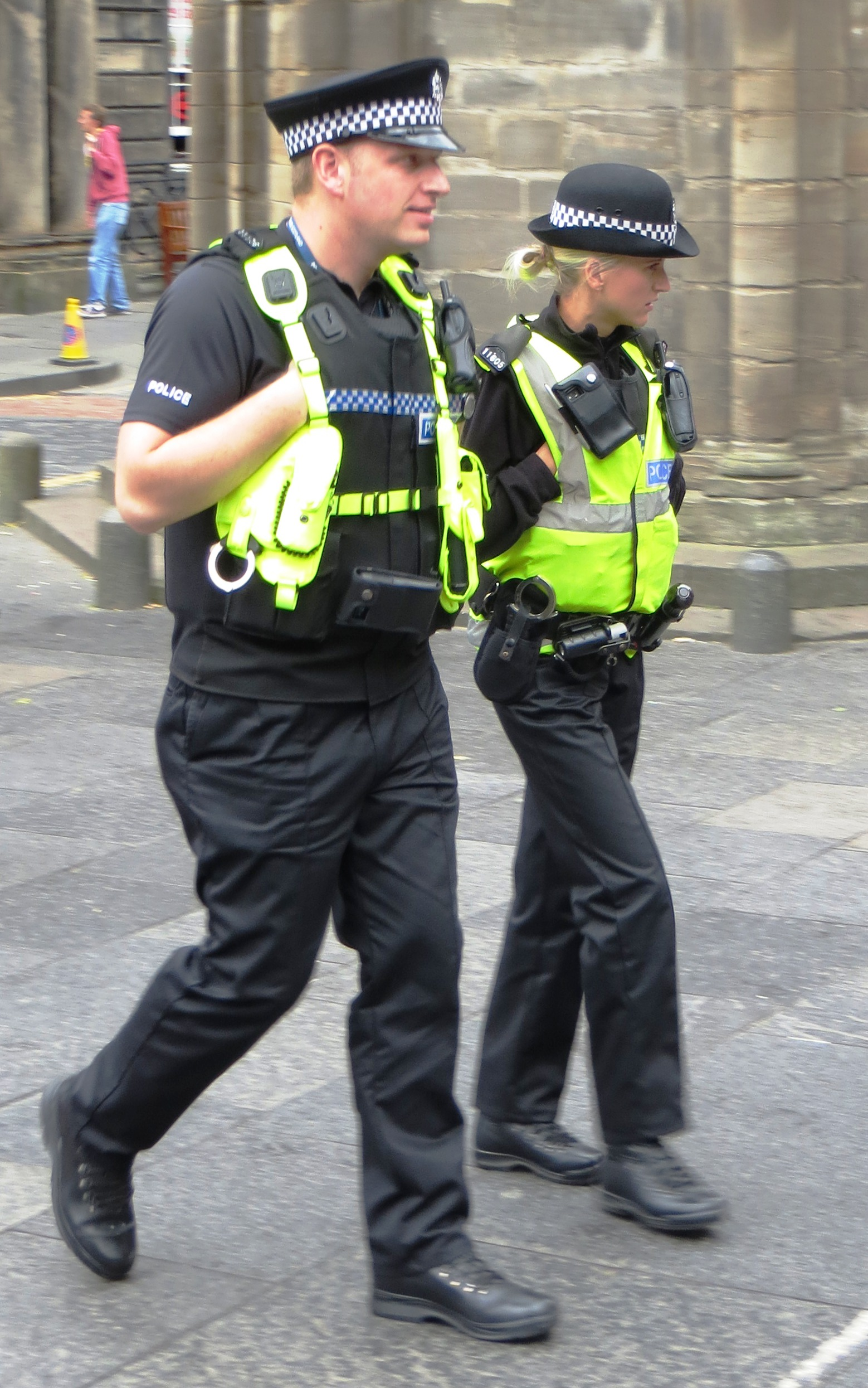
Police officers wearing uniform in Edinburgh

Standard uniform consists of black wicking T-shirts with POLICE SCOTLAND / POILEAS ALBA embroidered on opposite sleeves, and black cargo trousers. Black micro fleeces are also issued along with high visibility water-proof bomber jackets. Black body armour and high-visibility body armour covers with clickfast clips for items of equipment are also standard. Officers' headwear traditionally consists of peaked caps for males and bowler-style hats for females. These hats were banded with Sillitoe tartan—a black and white chequered dice pattern. The pattern was first adopted for police use in 1932 by Sir Percy Sillitoe, chief constable of the City of Glasgow Police. In September 2019, it was announced that officers were now able to wear baseball caps to make uniforms more gender-neutral. These caps are black with Sillitoe tartan flashes on both sides with "POLICE" stitched in white at the front and have previously been worn by specialist officers, such as the firearms unit and dog handlers.

Personal equipment consists of a police duty belt holding TCH 850 handcuffs, a friction lock expandable baton, PAVA incapacitant spray, leg restraints and a small first aid kit, all on a utility belt. In February 2022, it was announced that frontline officers would also be issued with naloxone spray which can be used to provide emergency treatment for opioid overdoses. All Police Scotland officers when on duty are issued with Motorola MTP6650 radios for use with the network. Officers use Samsung mobile phones, which are known as personal data assistants (PDA), or more commonly known as a terminal, instead of pocket paper notebooks. The software is supplied by Motorola Solutions, with EE holding the contract to provide mobile data. Since 2021, the number of frontline police officers trained and authorised to carry Taser, a conducted energy device, increased to 2,000 – representing almost one in eight of all officers.

=== Badge ===
In February 2013 it was reported that the previously announced logo for Police Scotland could not be used as the force had failed to seek approval from the Court of the Lord Lyon. This new symbol, a stylised thistle upon a Scottish saltire shield, failed to meet the longstanding heraldic rules of the Lyon Court and was thus discarded. A permanent logo was not approved in time for the creation of Police Scotland, but the pre-2013 crowned thistle emblem was reintroduced in July 2013.

This Scottish Constabulary badge was originally designed in the early 1930s by Robert Dickie Cairns Cairns (1866–1944), an art teacher at Dumfries Academy, for the former Dumfries Constabulary. As Scottish forces were amalgamating, a standard design of cap badge could be adopted, so new badges would not need to be purchased when forces merged. Each force then generally had its own distinctive cap badge, usually featuring the coat of arms of the city, burgh or county which it covered.

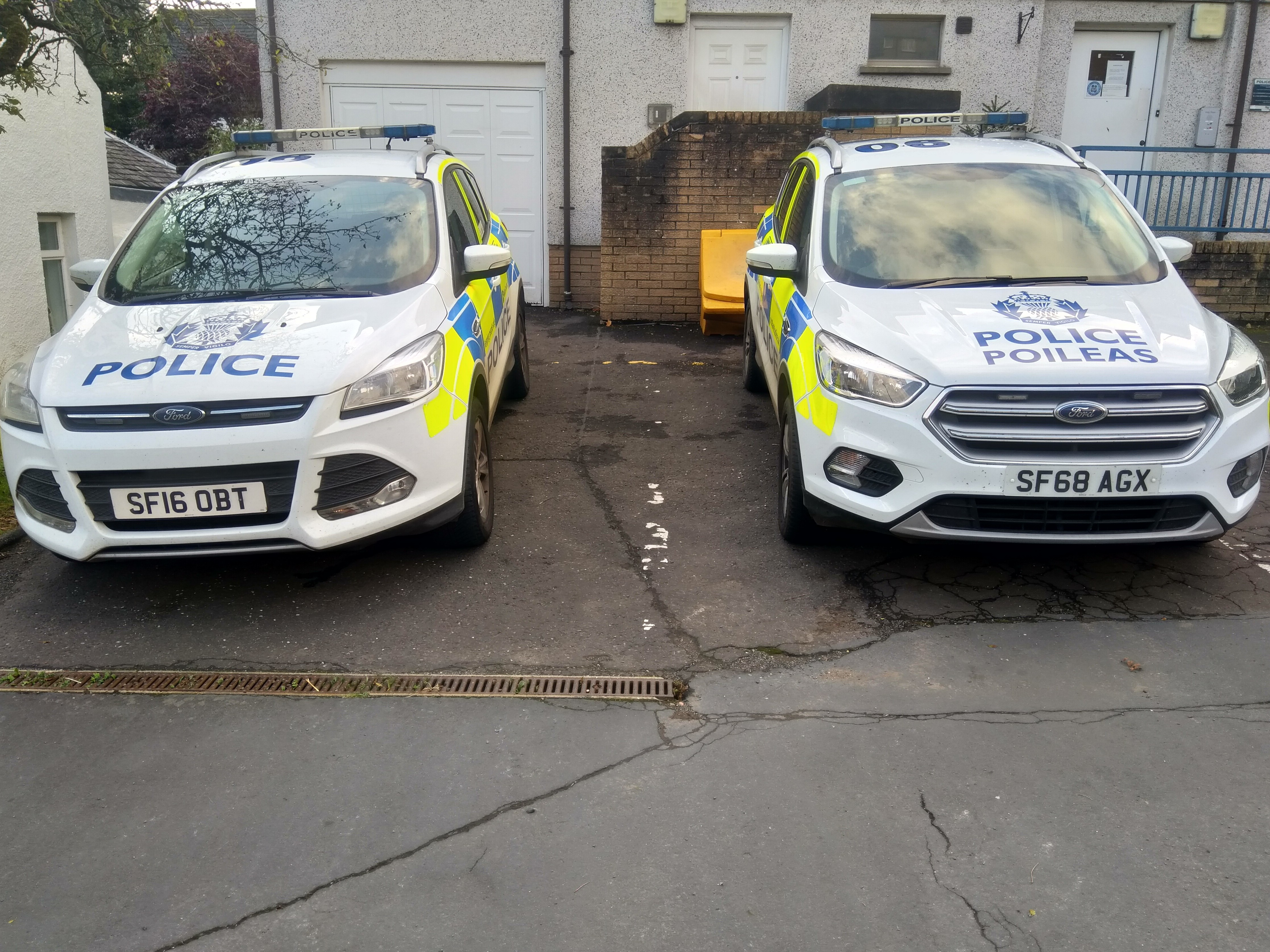
Monolingual (English) and bilingual (English and Gaelic) vehicle decals; both display a stylised Royal Badge of Scotland (a thistle surmounted by the Crown of Scotland) and the motto Semper Vigilo, Latin for "Always vigilant."

The design comprises a Scottish thistle in a wreath of thistle leaves, all on a scroll tablet with the Latin motto: Semper Vigilo (Always vigilant), and surmounted by a royal crown. The design originally featured a Tudor crown, but was not universally adopted until the Scottish police were reorganised in 1975, when a Scottish crown was used instead.

The badge is today worn by all officers of Police Scotland; in metal for constables and sergeants, and embroidered for the rank of inspector and above. UK-wide police forces operating in Scotland, such as British Transport Police, MOD Police and the Civil Nuclear Constabulary, wear their own force badge.

=== Vehicles ===
Police Scotland has a fleet of approximately 3,750 vehicles with under half (1,529) being high-visibility marked vehicles, as of April 2023. These vehicles are predominantly marked up in a "half-Battenburg" style.

In September 2015, Peugeot won the contract to provide response vehicles, after Ford had been awarded the first supply contract in January 2014.

== Police 101 ==
A national non-emergency phone number (101) was introduced on 21 February 2013, after having been successful in Wales and later England. When a caller dials 101, the system determines the caller's location and connects them to a call handler in the police service centre for the proper area. The 101 non-emergency phone is intended for situations when an emergency response is not required, to reduce pressure on the 999 system.

== Transport policing ==
There are also ongoing proposals backed by the Scottish Government for the British Transport Police's (BTP) Scottish division (D Division) to be merged with Police Scotland, in accordance with the Scotland Act 2016. In August 2016, the Scottish Government announced that their programme for the coming year would include a Railway Policing Bill which would provide primary legislation for the full integration of the functions of British Transport Police in Scotland into Police Scotland, and initiated an extensive consultation on the matter. However, the proposal has received criticism due to the potential impact on BTP and its viability across the rest of Britain, and the highly specialist nature of railway policing. The merger became possible after the responsibility for policing of railways in Scotland was devolved following a recommendation by the Smith Commission, and its later inclusion in draft legislation, with the UK Government stating "how rail transport is policed in Scotland will be a matter for Scotland once the legislation is passed".

Railway Policing (Scotland) Act 2017
- Act of the Scottish Parliament
- Scottish Parliament
- Long title: An Act of the Scottish Parliament to make provision about the arrangements for the Police Service of Scotland to police railways and railway property; and for connected purposes.
- Citation: 2017 asp 4

Dates
- Royal assent: 1 August 2017

Text of statute as originally enacted

Text of the Railway Policing (Scotland) Act 2017 as in force today (including any amendments) within the United Kingdom, from legislation.gov.uk.

It was announced that if BTP was to join Police Scotland a specialist "Rail Policing Unit" would be created. This unit would have sat alongside the Roads Policing Unit with officers receiving specialist training for dealing with rail incidents. The Railway Policing (Scotland) Act 2017 (asp 4) was passed, but in August 2018 the proposed integration of railway policing in Scotland was suspended amid concerns by Police Scotland officers and railway unions about the merger.

Other proposals backed by the Scottish Government include merging the Civil Nuclear Constabulary and Ministry of Defence Police into Police Scotland if further devolution over these areas is delivered to Holyrood.

== Controversy ==
In May 2015, Sheku Bayoh died after being arrested by nine police officers, whilst under the influence of drugs. Officers were responding to a report of a male in possession of a knife which was found at the scene.

In July 2015, Police Scotland failed to respond to an initial report of a vehicle crash on the M9. Lamara Bell was not discovered for three days despite concerned members of the public reporting the abandoned vehicle. She later died as a result of her injuries. Her boyfriend John Yuile also died.

In 2016, Police Scotland undertook a trial of so-called 'cyber-kiosks' for analysing the contents of mobile phones. Concerns over privacy sparked a Scottish Parliament inquiry and prompted human rights groups to query the legal basis that allows officers to seize and analyse phones.

In February 2017, Police Scotland's chief constable Phil Gormley resigned following misconduct allegations that fuelled worries about the leadership and governance of Scotland's national force. Gormley had been on indefinite leave since September, facing five separate investigations.

In September 2017, BBC Scotland reported that Police Scotland had compiled an illegal database on more than 10 per cent of the population. By early 2019, the Daily Express reported that, despite public outcry, no details had been removed, but a further 162,520 people's details had been illegally added.

A Home Office report in 2017 indicated that the rate of deaths in police custody in Scotland for the period 2014–16 (the only period for which figures were available from the Police Investigations and Review Commissioner) was four times higher than in the rest of the United Kingdom.

== See also ==
- Law enforcement in the United Kingdom
- List of law enforcement agencies in Scotland
- Scots law
- Powers of the police in Scotland
- Scottish Ambulance Service
- Scottish Fire and Rescue Service
