= Scottish Police College =

Police academy in Fife, Scotland

- Scottish Police College coat of arms
- Location: Tulliallan Castle, Kincardine, Fife, Scotland
- Motto: BI GLIC - BI GLIC
- Motto in English: Be Wise, Be Circumspect
- Architectural style: Castle
- Status: Active
- Website: www.scotland.police.uk/about-us/what-we-do/scottish-police-college/

The Scottish Police College is based at Tulliallan Castle, in Kincardine, Fife. Since 1 April 2013, the college has been under the control of Police Scotland.

In addition to probationer training, the college provides training in various specialist areas, such as Road Policing, Criminal Investigation, and training for newly promoted officers.

The motto of the college is, BI GLIC - BI GLIC, which is the cry of the oystercatcher which translates from Gaelic as 'Be Wise, Be Circumspect'. Oystercatchers can be found throughout the grounds of the college. The college's achievement depicts two oystercatchers surrounding the escutcheon of the Scottish Police Service which is in itself surrounded by two books to signify learning.

== History ==
Tulliallan Castle, a 160-year-old mixture of Gothic and Italian style architecture set amid some 90 acres (360,000 m^{2}) of parkland just north of where the Kincardine Bridge spans the River Forth, is the home of the Scottish Police College.

The castle was built for George Keith Elphinstone (Admiral Lord Keith, one time senior officer of Lord Nelson), from money received from prize ships. Construction was carried out by a labour force said to include French prisoners of war.

During the Second World War Tulliallan Castle was used by the Free Polish Army as its headquarters in Scotland.

Prior to the Second World War there was no central training for police officers in Scotland, but immediately thereafter it was decided that probationer constables from all forces should be trained centrally and that some training for more senior officers should also be provided. The result was Tulliallan, purchased in 1950 by the then Scottish Home Department for £9,100. The building was modernised and renovated and the first courses for inspectors and sergeants began in 1954.

== Divisions ==
=== Probationer Training Division ===
The Police Scotland probationer training programme takes a total of 2 years to complete.

All new recruits to the Police Service of Scotland undergo an Initial Training Course at the college which lasts 15 weeks and culminates in a Passing out Parade.

During this course recruits undergo training in various areas of policing including Police And The Community, Crime, Evidence, General Police Duties, Roads Policing, and Investigative Skills.

In addition to classroom based activity, recruits also undergo Officer Safety Training, teaching them the skills of unarmed combat, baton techniques, handcuff techniques, and the use of PAVA Spray.

Recruits undertake physical training focussed mainly on passing the Scottish Police Fitness Test which is currently level 5.4 on the Multi Stage Fitness Test.

Once starting Probationer Training officers are on probation for two years. During this time Probationary Officers attend local training centres to undertake further assessment and fitness testing.

=== Roads Policing Division ===
A Driver Training unit was formed at the college in 1964. It was later known as the Traffic Division, and more recently the Roads Policing Division. The change in name reflects the new name adopted by the Police Service for this aspect of policing.

The Roads Policing Division is responsible for training all officers of Police Scotland's Roads Policing Units, the division offers a number of courses, including,

- Basic Road Patrol Officer Course
- Advanced Police Driver Training
- Pursuit Management
- Police Motorcyclist Training
- Tachograph Examination Training
- Vehicle Examiner Training
- Forensic Collision Investigators

=== Crime Management Division ===
In 1981 Detective Training also came to Tulliallan, this now falls within the remit of Crime Management Division, which amongst other things, is primarily focused in the training of Detective Officers.

Some of the courses covered by this division include;

- Initial Detective Training
- Advanced Detective Training
- Senior Investigating Officers Course
- Drug Squad Training
- Child Protection Training
- Crime Scene Management
- Family Liaison Officer Training

=== Leadership and Management Division ===
Leadership and Management Division are responsible for the training of newly promoted officers, as well as officers undergoing training for promotion.

== Facilities ==
The college benefits from custom built Scenario Training Rooms, which have been built to replicate common places in which police officers may find themselves. The college has the following Scenario Rooms;

- Bank
- Shop (fully stocked with groceries etc.)
- Bedsit
- Pub
- Court Room

The college also has a lecture theatre that seats 202 students.

== Police Scotland ==
The Scottish Police College has been the headquarters of Police Scotland since 1 April 2013. The college trains officers from both Police Scotland and the British Transport Police.

== Scottish Police Memorial ==
The Flag of the Scottish Police Memorial Trust

The Scottish Police Memorial, a memorial to all police officers who have lost their lives on duty in Scotland, is located within the grounds of the college. It comprises three large granite stones, which carry the names of all police officers known to have lost their lives on duty in Scotland, the first being in 1812.
