= List of alumni of the University of St Andrews =

A group of St Andrews figures, including J. M. Barrie and Douglas Haig, at the 1922 rectorial installation

This list of alumni of the University of St Andrews includes graduates, non-graduate former students, and current students of the University of St Andrews, Fife, Scotland.

== Academics ==
=== Educators ===
Name	Year/degree	Notability	Reference
Andrew Bell	1774	Anglican priest, educationalist, founder of Madras College	
Normand MacLaurin	1854 M.A.	Physician; chancellor of the University of Sydney; Member of the New South Wales Legislative Council	
G. Gabrielle Starr		10th president of Pomona College; attended graduate school at St Andrews as a Robert T. Jones Scholar	
Walter Perry	1943 MB ChB, 1948 MD, 1958 DSc	Pharmacologist, physician, first Vice-Chancellor of the Open University, and life peer	
Eric Anderson	M.A.	Educationalist and Provost of Eton College	
P. C. Anderson	1892 M.A.	Educator, headmaster of Scotch College and golfer; winning the 1893 Amateur Championship	
John Adamson	M.A.	Minister, academic, Principal of the University of Edinburgh	
Edward Farrer		Oxford University academic and administrator, master of University College	
John Fulton		University administrator and public servant; vice-chancellor of the University of Wales and of the University of Sussex; chairman of the British Council	
Leonard Huxley		Schoolteacher, writer and editor; son of Thomas Henry Huxley	
Annie Lloyd Evans	M.A.	Superintendent of Fulham Training College for Women Teachers	

=== Professors and researchers ===
==== Sciences ====
Name	Year/degree	Notability	Reference
Helen ApSimon	PhD	Air pollution expert at Imperial College London	
John Hutton Balfour		Botanist and academic	
Michael J. Belton		Astronomer; president of the Belton Space Exploration Initiatives; chair of the 2002 NASA Planetary Science Decadal Survey; emeritus astronomer at the Kitt Peak National Observatory	
Michael Berry	1965 PhD	Mathematical physicist, known for discovering the Berry phase	
Gavin Brown	1963 M.A.	Mathematician, Vice-Chancellor of the University of Sydney and the University of Adelaide	
Leslie Hilton Brown		Agriculturalist and ornithologist	
Iain Donald Campbell	1963 BSc, 1967 PhD	Biophysicist and structural biologist, Professor of Structural Biology at the University of Oxford	
Ishbel Campbell	PhD/1931	British chemist researcher and lecturer who held one of the first Commonwealth Fellowships awarded to a woman.	
Hugh Cleghorn	1834 M.A.	Physician, botanist, forester, "the father of scientific forestry in India"	
Frank Close	1967 BSc	Particle physicist and Professor of Physics at the University of Oxford	
Dougal Dixon	1970 BSc, 1972 MSc	Geologist and author	
Angus Fulton	1922 BSc	Civil engineer, president of the Institution of Civil Engineers	
James Alexander Green		Mathematician and professor at the University of Warwick; active in the field of representation theory	
Suzanne Haber	PhD	Academic and neuroscientist, university professor	
Ernest William Lyons Holt	1888	Marine biologist and ichthyologist; his work helped lay a scientific foundation for the fishery management in Ireland	
Peggie Muriel Hobson	1952 Ph.D.	Geographer	
Rosemary Hutton	1948 M.A.	Geophysicist and pioneer of magnetotellurics	
James Irvine	BSc	Organic chemist and principal and vice-chancellor of the University of St Andrews, as a research chemist, Irvine worked on the application of methylation techniques to carbohydrates, and isolated the first methylated sugars, trimethyl and tetramethyl glucose	
Francis Robert Japp	1868 M.A.	Chemist, known for discovering the Japp-Klingemann reaction	
Benedict Jones	2005 PhD	Academic; research psychologist and lecturer at the University of Glasgow; studies the biological and social factors underlying face perception and preferences	
John Scott Keltie		Geographer, known for his work with the Royal Geographical Society	
William Elford Leach		Zoologist and marine biologist, described several species including Libinia emarginata	
John Leslie	1779	Physicist and mathematician, gave the first modern description of capillary action and the artificial production of ice, developed the Leslie cube	
James Bowman Lindsay	1825	Inventor, author, credited with early developments in several fields, such as incandescent lighting and telegraphy	
Donald MacCrimmon MacKay	1943 BSc	Physicist	
Maxwell T. Masters		Botanist and taxonomist, known for his work in vegetable teratology	
George Matthew McNaughton	1916 BSc	Civil engineer, chief engineer to the Department of Health	
William M'Intosh	1857	Physician, psychiatrist, marine biologist, awarded the 1924 Linnean Medal	
Maureen Muggeridge		Geologist, worked mainly in diamond mining	
James D. Murray	1953 BA, 1956 PhD	Academic and mathematician, worked mainly in mathematical biology, held professorships at Oxford University and the University of Washington	
John Napier	1563 (did not graduate)	Mathematician, physicist, astronomer, astrologer, known for discovering logarithms, inventing Napier's bones and popularising the use of the decimal point	
Mark M. Newell	1996 PhD	Academic and underwater archeologist	
William Richmond		Biochemist, discovered the Richmond Test, a test for blood cholesterol levels	
Catherine Steele	1925 BSc, 1928 PhD	Plant biochemist	

==== Humanities ====
Name	Year/degree	Notability	Reference
Robert Balfour		Philosopher	
G.W.S. Barrow		Historian and academic	
Stephen Haliczer		Historian	
Kieron O'Hara		Philosopher, computer scientist and political writer	
Russell Kirk	1953 D.Litt.	Political theorist, moralist, historian, social critic, literary critic, fiction author, known for his influence on 20th-century American conservatism	
Dominic Sandbrook		Historian and author	
Lawrence Stenhouse		Educationalist	
Robert Archibald Armstrong		Lexicographer	
James Crichton	1574 BA M.A.	Polymath and origin of the term 'the admirable Crichton'	
Michael Wesley	PhD	Academic, professor of national security at the Australian National University	
Bethwell Allan Ogot	1959 M.A.	Historian and chancellor of Moi University	
Adam Ferguson	1742 M.A.	Philosopher and historian of the Scottish Enlightenment; "the father of modern sociology"	
Steve Boardman	1989 PhD	Medieval historian	
John Craig	M.A.	Classicist, Firth Professor of Latin at the University of Sheffield	
William Craigie	1888	Philologist, lexicographer	
James Main Dixon	1879	Professor of English literature, author, scholar of the Scots language	
John Elder		Cartographer, writer, tutor of Henry Stuart, Lord Darnley	
Duncan Forbes		Academic, linguist, translator, worked at King's College London and the British Museum, remembered for the erroneous Cox–Forbes theory	
Peter Goodwin	MPhil	Maritime historian, author, former keeper and curator of HMS Victory	
George Hadow	1731 M.A., 1740 MD	Professor of Hebrew and oriental languages at St Mary's College	
Bonaventure Hepburn		Roman Catholic linguist, lexicographer, philologist, biblical commentator, held the post of Keeper of Oriental Books and Manuscripts at the Vatican	
Alexander Haslam	M.A.	Academic and professor of psychology at the University of Queensland	
David N. Hempton	1977 PhD	Academic and historian of evangelical Protestant Christianity; dean of Harvard Divinity School; fellow of the Royal Historical Society	
Robert Kirk	1664	Minister; Gaelic scholar; folklorist; known for The Secret Commonwealth, a treatise on fairy folklore, witchcraft, ghosts, and the second sight, a type of extrasensory perception described as a phenomenon by the people of the Scottish Highlands	
Norman Kemp Smith	1902 PhD	Academic, philosopher; held professorships at Princeton University and Edinburgh University; known for his English translation of Immanuel Kant's Critique of Pure Reason	
Roger Lewis	1982	Academic, biographer, journalist, wrote biographies of Anthony Burgess, Peter Sellers and Laurence Olivier	
William Manderstown	C. 16th century	Philosopher, Rector of the University of Paris	
James Mylne		Philosopher and academic	
Kieron O'Hara	M.A.	Philosopher, computer scientist, political writer and academic	
Richard Oram	1983 M.A., 1988 PhD	Historian and academic	
Stephen Daniels	M.A.	Professor of Cultural Geography at University of Nottingham, awarded Victoria Medal from the Royal Geographical Society, Fellow of the British Academy	
Alan Stewart Duthie	1960 M.A.	Professor of Linguistics at University of Ghana. Instrumental in establishment of the study of Linguistics in Ghana. He also was a long-serving member of the translation committee of the Bible Society of Ghana.	
Lucy Beall Lott	2021 M.A.	PhD student of medieval art history, activist and model with Epidermolysis bullosa dystrophica.	

==== Nobel laureates ====
The Nobel Prizes are awarded each year for outstanding research, the invention of ground-breaking techniques or equipment, or outstanding contributions to society.

Name	Year/degree	Notability	Reference
James Black	1946 MB ChB	Physician, pharmacologist; winner of 1988 Nobel Prize in Physiology or Medicine; developed beta blockers and H2 receptor antagonists	

== Medicine ==
Name	Class year	Notability	Reference(s)
Edward Jenner	1792 MD	Physician and pioneer of the smallpox vaccine	
Joseph Bancroft	1859 MD	Surgeon and parasitologist, discovered filariasis	
Douglas Black	1933 MB ChB	Physician and the author of the Black Report	
John Garrow	MD, PhD	Honorary consultant physician, nutrition scientist, and editor of the European Journal of Clinical Nutrition	
Robert Whytt	1730 M.A., 1737 MD	Physician and president of the Royal College of Physicians of Edinburgh	
John Arbuthnot	1696 MD	Physician to Queen Anne, satirist, polymath, creator of the character John Bull	
Patrick Abercromby	1685 MD	Physician, antiquarian, personal physician to King James VII (II of England)	
George Ballingall		Physician, surgeon, regius professor of military surgery at Edinburgh University	
John Barclay	B.D	Comparative anatomist, extramural teacher in anatomy, and director of the Highland Society of Scotland	
Robert Batty	1797 MD	Obstetric physician and amateur artist	
Golding Bird	1838 MD 1840 M.A.	Physician; authority on kidney disease; known for his work in the medical uses of electricity and electrochemistry	
Charles Bisset	1766 MD	Physician and military engineer	
David Bruce		Physician, an original member of the Royal Society	
Elizabeth Bryson	1905 MBChB, 1907 MD	Physician and broadcaster who pioneered research on the psychosomatic approach in gynecology	
Sheila Callender	1935 BSc, 1938 MBChB, 1944 MD	Physician, haematologist	
John Clephane	1729 MD	Physician, military physician and correspondent of David Hume	
Andrew Duncan	1762 M.A., 1769 MD	President of the Royal Medical Society and the Royal College of Physicians in Edinburgh, founder of the first lunatic asylum in Edinburgh, Professor of Theory of Medicine at University of Edinburgh	
John Eliot	1759 MD	Physician, and personal physician to George IV	
Margaret Fairlie	1915 MB ChB	Physician, academic, first woman to hold a professorial chair in Scotland	
John Goodsir		Anatomist and pioneer of cell biology	
George Britton Halford	1854 MD	Anatomist, physiologist, founder of the first medical school in Australia, the University of Melbourne School of Medicine	
John Lorimer	1764 M.D	Royal Army Surgeon, Fellow of the Royal College of Surgeons of Edinburgh	
James Simson	MD	Medical academic and the second Chandos Professor of Medicine and Anatomy at the University of St Andrews	
John Jebb	1777 MD	Physician, divine, religious and political reformer, Fellow of Peterhouse College, Cambridge	
Richard Poole	1805 MD	Physician, psychiatrist, phrenologist, editor of the New Edinburgh Review, the Phrenological Journal and Encyclopædia Edinensis	
Hubert Lacey	MB ChB	Physician, psychiatrist, professor of psychiatry at St George's Medical School	
John Pringle		Physician, 'father of military medicine'	
Charles Rizza	1962 MD	Physician, haematologist, haemophilia expert	
Stewart Duke-Elder	1919 BSc M.A. 1923 MB ChB 1925 MD	Physician, ophthalmologist and founder of the UCL Institute of Ophthalmology; Surgeon-Oculist to King Edward VIII, George VI and Queen Elizabeth II; awarded the 1957 Lister Medal	
Samuel Cockburn	1848 MD	Physician, homeopath, critic of the medical establishment of the time	
Daniel Noble	1832 M.A. 1833 MD	Physician, known for contributions to the study of mental illness and epidemiology	
John William Tripe	1846 MD	President of the Royal Meteorological Society (1871–72)	
William Wright	MD 1763	President of the London Royal School of Medicine, Physician in Chief of Jamaica, the genus Wrightia (Apocynaceae) are named after him	
Busick Harwood	MD 1790	Professor of Anatomy at University of Cambridge	
George William Balfour	MD 1845	Honorary Physician in Ordinary to King Edward VII in Scotland.	
Anthony Brownless	MD 1846	Founder of the University of Melbourne Medical School	
Anthony Home	MD 1848	Scottish physician, Surgeon General of the British Army, recipient of the Victoria Cross	
Benjamin Ward Richardson	MD 1854	British physician, introduced over 14 anesthetics including methylene bichloride, invented the double valve mouthpiece for administration of chloroform	
Thomas Egerton Hale	MD 1855	Scottish physician, Surgeon Major of the British Army, recipient of the Victoria Cross	
Douglas Argyll Robertson	MD 1857	Scottish ophthalmologist, described the Argyll Robertson pupil a sign of neurosyphilis	
Pulney Andy	MD 1860	Became the first Indian to receive a British medical degree and established the National Church of India in Madras.	
Andrew Logan	MB ChB 1929	Surgeon who pioneered the mechanical dilation of the mitral valve to treat mitral stenosis	
John Forfar	BSc 1938, MB ChB 1941, MD 1958	Pediatrician and author of the Forfar and Arneil's Textbook of Paediatrics, awarded the Military Cross for service during the Second World War	
Walter Perry	MB ChB 1943, MD 1948, DSc 1958	Dean of Medicine of the University of Edinburgh Medical School, First Vice-Chancellor of the Open University, Life Peer of the House of Lords	
J. Michael Henderson	MB ChB 1969	Chief Medical Officer of the University of Mississippi Medical Center, Chair of Surgery at the Cleveland Clinic Lerner College of Medicine	
Alexander Burns Wallace	PhD 1973	Plastic surgeon, co-founder and President of the British Association of Plastic Surgeons, founding editor of the British Journal of Plastic Surgery, developed the Wallace rule of nines, a method of determining the proportion of body affected by burns	
Kim Fox	MB ChB	Diana Princess of Wales Chair in Cardiovascular Medicine and Science at the Royal Brompton Hospital, Head of the National Heart and Lung Institute at Imperial College School of Medicine, Editor in Chief of the European Heart Journal and President of the European Society of Cardiology	
Nancy Conn	MB ChB 1945	Bacteriologist known for preventing a typhoid outbreak in Edinburgh in 1970.	
Narendra Patel, Baron Patel	MB ChB 1964	Obstetrician and Chancellor of the University of Dundee	

== Business and finance ==
Name	Year/degree	Notability	Reference
Alexander Balfour		Merchant and founder of the shipping company Balfour Williamson	
Peter Burt		Businessman, former chief executive and later Governor of the Bank of Scotland	
Archibald Constable		Publisher, bookseller and stationer; his company continues to this day as Constable & Robinson	
John Cuckney		Industrialist, civil servant and peer	
Henry Duncan		Minister; founder of the world's first commercial saving bank, Trustee Savings Bank	
Iain Ferguson		Chief executive of Tate & Lyle; chairman	
Robert Horton		Chief Executive of BP; Chancellor of the University of Kent	
Andrew Mackenzie	1977 BSc	Chief Executive of BHP, the world's largest mining company	
George Mathewson	1966 PhD	CEO of the Royal Bank of Scotland and convener of the Council of Economic Advisers	
Robert Paul Reid		Chief executive of Shell and Sears; chairman of the British Railways Board and the International Petroleum Exchange	
John Rose	1975 M.A.	Businessman and CEO of Rolls-Royce	
Olivier Sarkozy	M.A.	Investment banker and half brother of the French President, Nicolas Sarkozy	

== Government, law, and public policy ==
Note: Individuals who belong in multiple sections appear in the first relevant section.

=== Members of the Scottish Parliament ===
Name	Year/degree	Notability	Reference
Alex Salmond	M.A.	Former First minister of Scotland; former leader of the Scottish National Party	
Marco Biagi		Politician and MSP for Edinburgh central	
Marlyn Glen		Scottish Labour politician; Member of the Scottish Parliament for North East Scotland	
George Reid	1962 M.A.	Politician; SNP Member of Parliament for Clackmannan and East Stirlingshire; regional MSP for Mid Scotland and Fife; Scottish Parliament's second Presiding Officer	
Jamie Stone	1977 M.A.	Scottish Liberal Democrat politician, member of the Scottish Parliament for Caithness, Sutherland, and Easter Ross	
Chic Brodie	1966 BSc	Politician, MSP for South Scotland	
Marlyn Glen	M.A.	Labour Party politician, MSP for North East Scotland	
Gordon Jackson		Scottish Labour Party politician, lawyer, MSP for Glasgow Govan	

=== Members of the House of Commons ===
Name	Year/degree	Notability	Reference
Angie Bray		Politician and MP for Ealing Central and Acton	
Sir Malcolm Bruce		Politician; Deputy Leader of the Liberal Democrats; Leader of the Scottish Liberal Democrats; Member of Parliament for Gordon; chairman of the International Development Select Committee	
Michael Forsyth	1976	Politician; financier; Member of Parliament for Stirling; served in the cabinet of John Major as Secretary of State for Scotland	
Barry Gardiner	M.A.	Labour Party politician, Member of Parliament for Brent North	
Mark Lazarowicz	1976 M.A.	Labour Co-operative politician, Member of Parliament for Edinburgh North and Leith	
John MacGregor	1959 M.A.	Member of Parliament for South Norfolk; government minister under Margaret Thatcher; Leader of the House of Commons; Lord President of the Council	
Desmond Swayne		Conservative Party politician; Member of Parliament for New Forest West; Lord Commissioner of HM Treasury	
Sir Hugo Swire		Conservative Party politician; Member of Parliament for East Devon; Minister of State for the Foreign Office	
James Brodie of Brodie		Politician; botanist; MP for Elginshire; Lord Lieutenant of Nairn	
Thomas Shaw	1902 L.L.D.	Liberal politician; judge; MP for Hawick Burghs; Lord Advocate	
Stephen Doughty		Labour Party politician and MP for Cardiff South and Penarth	
Thomas Dundas		Politician; aristocrat; MP for Richmond and Stirlingshire; remembered for commissioning the Charlotte Dundas, the world's first practical steamboat	
Sir Michael Fallon	1974 M.A.	Conservative Party politician; Secretary of State for Defence; MP for Sevenoaks; deputy Chairman of the Conservative Party; Minister of State for Business and Enterprise in the Cameron ministry	
Lewis Moonie	1970 MB ChB	Labour Co-operative politician, Member of Parliament for Kirkcaldy	
David Carnegie		Politician, nobleman, MP for Aberdeen Burghs	
John Alfred Lush	MD	Liberal Party politician, MP for Salisbury	
Robert MacGregor Mitchell		Liberal Party politician; lawyer; judge; MP for Perth; Rector of the University of St Andrews	

=== Other ===
Name	Year/degree	Notability	Reference
John Sawers		British Ambassador to the UN and director of MI6	
Hikmat Abu Zayd	1950 M.A.	First female member of the Cabinet of Egypt	
Henry Balnaves		Politician and religious reformer	
John Hamilton-Gordon		Politician, Lord lieutenant of Ireland and Governor General of Canada	
Colleen Bell		United States Ambassador to Hungary	
Edgar Paul Boyko		Attorney, served as Attorney General for the State of Alaska	
Thomas Bruce		Nobleman and diplomat, known for the removal of marble sculptures (also known as the Elgin Marbles) from the Parthenon in Athens	
Eamonn Butler		Director and co-founder of the Adam Smith Institute think tank; author and broadcaster on economic and social issues	
Archibald Campbell		De facto head of government in Scotland during most of the conflict known as the Wars of the Three Kingdoms; major figure in the Covenanter movement	
Duncan Ndegwa	M.A.	Civil servant, banker; first African governor of the Central Bank of Kenya; head of the Kenyan Civil Service	
John Campbell		Liberal politician, lawyer, man of letters, Lord High Chancellor of Ireland, Lord High Chancellor of Great Britain	
James Graham		Nobleman, soldier, initially joined the Covenanters in the Wars of the Three Kingdoms, but subsequently supported King Charles I as the English Civil War developed	
John Graham		Soldier, nobleman, Tory, Episcopalian	
John Campbell		Nobleman and the fourth Governor General of Canada from 1878 to 1883	
Arthur Hobhouse		Local government Liberal politician; architect of the system of National parks of England and Wales	
David Kurten	1993 BSc	Leader of the Heritage Party	
James Younger		Politician and elected hereditary peer who sits on the Conservative benches in the House of Lords; Lord-in-waiting	
Jean-Paul Marat	1775 MD	Physician, political theorist, scientist, radical journalist and politician in France during the French Revolution	
Madsen Pirie	1974 PhD	Researcher, author, educator, founder and current president of the Adam Smith Institute	
Lyon Playfair		Scientist and Liberal politician, held the offices of Postmaster General and Chairman of Ways and Means	
Catherine Stihler	M.A.	Labour Party politician; Member of the European Parliament for Scotland; returned as the Rector of the University of St Andrews in 2014	
James Wilson	1763 M.A.	Founding Father of the United States; a signatory of the United States Declaration of Independence; one of the six original justices appointed by George Washington to the Supreme Court of the United States	
Robert F. Thompson		Democratic member of the Arkansas Senate, represented the 11th District	
Richard Arthur	1885 M.A.	Politician, social reformer, physician, Member of the Parliament of New South Wales	
Alastair Balls	M.A.	Senior economic adviser to HM Treasury and chairman of the International Centre for Life	
Henry Balnaves	M.A.	Politician, Lord Justice Clerk and Protestant religious reformer	
David Erskine		Nobleman, eccentric, founded the Society of Antiquaries of Scotland	
Stuart Butler	1968 BSc 1971 M.A. 1978 PhD	Director of the Center for Policy Innovation at The Heritage Foundation, a conservative think tank in Washington, D.C.; associate professor at the Georgetown Public Policy Institute	
Pamela Chesters		Conservative politician; advisor for health and youth opportunities to the Mayor of London, Boris Johnson	
James Hamilton	1584 BA 1585 MA	Scot who became owner of large tracts of land in County Down, Ireland, and founded a successful Protestant settlement there several years before the Plantation of Ulster	
James Clinkskill		Politician and engineer, merchant, author, justice of the peace and mayor of Saskatoon	
Robert Cox		Gelatine and glue manufacturer and Liberal Unionist politician	
George Mackenzie		Statesman; Secretary of State; Lord Justice General	
Alastair Crooke	1972 M.A.	Diplomat; founder and director of the Conflicts Forum; a figure in MI6	
Kevin Dunion	1978 M.A.	Politician; first Scottish Information Commissioner; Rector of the University of St Andrews	
James Glenie		Businessman and political figure in New Brunswick, represented Sunbury County in the Legislative Assembly of New Brunswick	
Gordon Ritchie	MB ChB	Progressive Conservative Party member of the House of Commons of Canada for Dauphin	
George Turner Orton	1860 MD	Liberal-Conservative member of the House of Commons of Canada for Wellington Centre	
John Young Bown	1863 MD	Liberal-Conservative member of the House of Commons of Canada for Brant North	
Frances Josephy		Liberal Party politician, chairman of the Federal Union	
Donald Luddington	1940 M.A.	Colonial government official, civil servant, Governor of the Solomon Islands and High Commissioner for the Western Pacific	
David Lyndsay	1509	Lord Lyon and poet	
William Maitland		Politician, reformer, Secretary of State	
Douglas Mason	1963	Policymaker, author, known for his work with the Adam Smith Institute in developing the poll tax	
Hugh Lyon Playfair	M.A. L.L.D.	Provost of St Andrews; officer in the Bengal Horse Artillery; prominent figure in The Royal and Ancient Golf Club of St Andrews	
Dr. Fiona Hill (presidential advisor)	M.A.	Academic, foreign policy specialist, and former Special Assistant to the President and Senior Director for European and Russian Affairs on the United States National Security Council (2017–2019) Testified in Trump impeachment hearings.	
David Holmes		American diplomat, testified in Trump impeachment hearings.	

=== Law ===
Name	Year/degree	Notability	Reference
James Dundas, Lord Arniston		Lord of Session and Shire Commissioner to the Scottish Parliament	
Duncan McNeill	1809 MD	Advocate; judge; MP for Argyllshire; Lord Justice General; Lord President of the Court of Session	
Ronald Mackay	M.A.	Lawyer and judge of the College of Justice, sitting in the Inner House of the Court of Session	
George Dempster	1750 (did not graduate)	Advocate, landowner, agricultural improver, politician; served as MP for the Perth Burghs; founded the bank George Dempster & Co.; director of the East India Company; provost of the town of St Andrews; director of the Highland Society; key figure of the Scottish Enlightenment	
William Kirk Dickson	1912 L.L.D.	Advocate; librarian; writer; Keeper of the Advocates' Library; Librarian of the National Library of Scotland	
David Erskine		Judge and MP for Forfarshire	
William Lamb	1520 M.A.	Cleric, lawyer, author, senator at the College of Justice	
George Mackenzie	1653	Lawyer, Lord Advocate, and legal writer	
Robert Moray	C. 16th century (did not graduate)	Statesman, diplomat, judge, spy, freemason, natural philosopher, known for his role in the founding of the Royal Society	

== Military and national intelligence ==
Name	Year/degree	Notability	Reference
Anthony Dickson Home		Surgeon General of the British Army who was awarded the Victoria Cross for valour during the Indian Mutiny	
Alistair Irwin		British Army officer; Adjutant-General to the Forces in the United Kingdom; Commandant of Sandhurst	
Ewaryst Jakubowski	1940	Polish paratrooper; member of the Polish Army in Exile; stationed in St Andrews during World War II; attended art classes at the university; completed the Polish memorial mosaic on the town hall; parachuted into Poland as one of the Cichociemni and died in August 1944 during the Warsaw Uprising	
J. M. Bruce Lockhart	1936	Deputy Director of MI6 and military attaché	
Tony Mason	M.A.	Air vice-marshal in the RAF, Air Secretary	
James Graham		Nobleman, poet, soldier, Captain General of Scotland.	
William Gordon Rutherfurd		Commander of HMS Swiftsure at the Battle of Trafalgar	
Barney White-Spunner	1981	Commander of the British Field Army	
George Kennedy Young		Deputy Director of MI6 and Merchant Banker	
Alex Younger		Director of MI6	
Edward Smyth-Osbourne		Commanding Officer of the Household Division, Colonel of the Life Guards and Gold Stick in Waiting to the Queen. Honorary Colonel of the Tayforth UOTC.	

== Journalism and media ==
Name	Year/degree	Notability	Reference
B. C. Forbes	1897	Financial journalist, author, founded Forbes magazine	
Louise Minchin		Journalist and television presenter who works mainly for the BBC	
Tim Samuels		Documentary filmmaker and broadcaster	
Brian Taylor	1977 M.A.	Journalist and the political editor for BBC Scotland	
Craig Oliver	M.A.	News editor, producer, media executive; director of communications for the former British prime minister David Cameron; former controller of English news output for BBC Global News	
Judith Bumpus	1961 M.A.	Radio producer for the BBC specialising in coverage of the arts, particularly the work of visual artists	
Robbie Collin	M.A.	Writer and film critic for the Daily Telegraph	
Jolyon Connell	M.A.	Sunday Telegraph and Sunday Times journalist, founded The Week	
Margaret MacPherson	1914	Journalist, editor and writer	
Chris Morgan	1976 M.Theol.	Journalist, BBC television and radio	

== Literature, writing, and translation ==
Name	Year/degree	Notability	Reference
Alistair Moffat	1972 M.A.	Writer; journalist; director of the Edinburgh Festival Fringe; Rector of the University of St Andrews	
Robert Aytoun	1588 M.A.	Poet, lawyer, court poet to the queen of King James I and VI, one of the first Scots to write in standard English	
Andrew Crumey		Novelist and literary editor of the Edinburgh newspaper Scotland on Sunday	
Gavin Douglas	1494	Bishop, makar and translator	
William Dunbar	1479 M.A.	Poet and makar	
Alexander Hume	M.A.	Poet	
Robert Fergusson	1763 (did not graduate)	Poet, known for his influence on Robert Burns	
Sarah Hall	M.Litt.	Novelist; poet; author of the Man Booker Prize-shortlisted The Electric Michaelangelo	
Gilbert Hay		Poet and translator	
James A. Michener	Research Student, Lippincott Fellowship	American author. Winner of the Pulitzer Prize for Fiction.	
David Lyndsay		Lord Lyon and poet	
Bruce Marshall		Fiction and nonfiction writer whose works were the subject of numerous television and film adaptations	
Hilary McKay		Writer of children's books, winner of the 1992 Guardian Children's Fiction Prize	
Alastair Reynolds	PhD	Science fiction author	
William Tennant		Scholar and poet	
Fay Weldon		Author, essayist and playwright whose work has been associated with feminism	
Timothy Williams	1970 M.A.	Author and winner of a Crime Writers' Association award	
Andrew Lang		Poet, novelist, literary critic, contributor to the field of anthropology; known as a collector of folk and fairy tales	
Robert Henryson		Poet and makar	
Thomas Finlayson Henderson		Historian and biographer	
Helen Bannerman	1887 L.L.A.	Author of children's books; known for her first book, The Story of Little Black Sambo (1899)	
John Bellenden	M.A.	Writer and translator to James V	
Thomas Bowdler		Physician and philanthropist, known for publishing The Family Shakspeare, an expurgated edition of William Shakespeare's work	
Pete Brown		Writer on beer and drinking culture around the world	
James Browne	M.A.	Writer and man of letters	
Patrick Brydone		Traveller and author who served as Comptroller of the Stamp Office	
Thomas Craig	1555 BA	Jurist and poet	
William Fowler	1578	Poet, makar, writer, courtier, and translator	
James Graeme	1769 (did not graduate)	Poet	
Michael Hulse	1977 M.A.	Translator, critic and poet, notable especially for his translations of German novels by W. G. Sebald	
Alexander Hume	1574 BA	Poet	
William Lauder	1537	Cleric, playwright, and poet	
Nicholas Moore		Poet, associated with the New Apocalyptics	
Julia Ember		Author, associated with The Seafarer's Kiss	
Jay Parini	1975 Ph.D.	Novelist, poet, biographer, academic	
Dave Duncan		Author	

== Entertainment ==
Name	Year/degree	Notability	Reference
Crispin Bonham-Carter	1992	Actor and theatre director	
Dilys Breese	1954 M.A.	Natural history television producer for the BBC and an ornithologist	
Michelle Duncan		Actress	
Tenniel Evans		Actor	
Hazel Irvine	1980	Television presenter	
Siobhan Redmond		Actress	
Jonathan Taylor Thomas		Actor, voice actor, former child star, teen idol, known for his role as the middle child Randy Taylor on the sitcom Home Improvement	
Andrew Lawrence		Comedian and winner of the 2004 BBC New Act of the Year	
Denny Delk	2004 BSc	Actor, voice actor, known for providing the voice of Murray in the Monkey Island game series and a range of voices in LucasArts games	
David Caves		Actor	
Saba Douglas-Hamilton	1993 M.A.	Wildlife conservationist, television presenter, known for the television series The Secret Life of Elephants	
Jules Knight		Actor	
Ian McDiarmid		Actor, known for portraying the villain Emperor Palpatine in the Star Wars film series	
Abigail Thorn	2015 M.A.	Actress and YouTuber, known for the ongoing series Philosophy Tube and play The Prince	

== Music ==
Name	Year/degree	Notability	Reference
Kid Canaveral		Indie pop band	
David Jackson		Progressive rock saxophonist, flutist, composer, known for his work with the band Van der Graaf Generator	

== Visual arts ==
Name	Year/degree	Notability	Reference
Thomas Rodger		Early photography pioneer	
John Adamson	1843 MD	Physician and pioneer photographer	
Philip Colbert		Fashion designer, artist and journalist	
George Denholm Armour		Painter	
Kate Holt		Photojournalist	
Andrew Nairne	1983 M.A.	Curator, museum director, director of Kettle's Yard	
Franki Raffles	1977 M.A.	Social documentary photographer	

== Religion ==
Name	Year/degree	Notability	Reference
David Beaton		Archbishop of St Andrews, Chancellor of the University of St Andrews and the last Scottish Cardinal prior to the Reformation	
James Beaton	1493 M.A.	Archbishop of St Andrews, Lord Chancellor of Scotland the Keeper of the Great Seal of Scotland, Chancellor of the University of St Andrews	
Alexander Duff		Christian missionary in India, founded the Scottish Church College and played a part in establishing the University of Calcutta	
Thomas Chalmers		Minister, professor of theology, political economist, and a leader of the Free Church of Scotland	
Colin Falcone		Minister and bishop	
Gordon Gray		Cardinal of the Catholic Church. First Catholic priest to have graduated from the university since the reformation.	
George Gillespie		Theologian	
Patrick Hamilton		Churchman; early Protestant Reformer in Scotland; known for being burnt at the stake outside St Salvator's Chapel	
Alexander Henderson	1603	Theologian and major figure in the development of the reformed church in Scotland	
John Knox		Clergyman and a leader of the Protestant Reformation in Scotland	
George Buchanan	1525 BA	Historian and humanist scholar, part of the Monarchomach movement	
Andrew Melville		Scholar, theologian and religious reformer	
John Munro		Presbyterian minister of Tain, in the Scottish Highlands	
Sheila Watson		Cleric in the Church of England	
John Witherspoon	1764 M.A. BD	Presbyterian minister; a signatory of the United States Declaration of Independence as a representative of New Jersey; president of College of New Jersey (now Princeton University)	
John Adamson	1757 M.A.	Minister and Moderator of the General Assembly of the Church of Scotland	
Patrick Adamson	M.A.	Minister, divine, and Archbishop of St Andrews	
Matthew Armour		Radical Free Church of Scotland minister on the island of Sanday, Orkney	
Robert Arnot		Presbyterian minister; professor of divinity at St Andrews University; moderator of the General Assembly of the Church of Scotland	
John Munro		Presbyterian minister of Tain, in the Scottish Highlands	
Klyne Snodgrass	1973 PhD	Theologian, author and professor of New Testament Studies at the North Park Theological Seminary	
Victor Premasagar	PhD	Churchman, Old Testament scholar, Moderator of the Church of South India	
John Barclay	1759 M.A.	Minister and founder of the Bereans	
Robert Baron	1613 M.A.	Theologian and one of the Aberdeen doctors	
Edward Barry	MD	Minister, popular preacher, grand chaplain to the Freemasons	
Robert Blackadder	1461 M.A.	Cleric, diplomat, politician, first Archbishop of Glasgow	
Hugh Blair	1577 DD	Minister of religion, author, rhetorician, considered one of the first great theorists of written discourse	
Donald Campbell		Nobleman and abbot	
Neil Campbell	1575 M.A.	Bishop of Argyll	
Séon Carsuel	1544 M.A.	Prelate, humanist and Protestant reformer	
William Chisholm		Bishop of Dunblane and bishop of Vaison	
Sidney Clarke	1896 M.A.	Anglican RAF Chaplain and Honorary Chaplain to the King	
William Couper	1583 M.A.	Bishop of Galloway and Dean of the Chapel Royal	
Henry Craik		Hebraist, theologian and preacher	
William Dalrymple	1779 DD	Religious writer, minister and moderator of the Church of Scotland	
Robert Davidson	1945 M.A. 1952 BD	Professor of Old Testament at the University of Glasgow and was Moderator of the General Assembly of the Church of Scotland	
Gavin Dunbar	1475 M.A.	Bishop of Aberdeen and Keeper of the Great Seal of Scotland	
Andrew Durie		Bishop of Galloway and abbot of Melrose	
Andrew de Durisdeer	M.A.	Bishop of Glasgow	
Andrew Dutney	1985 PhD	President of the Assembly of the Uniting Church in Australia; professor at Flinders University	
Andrew Fairfoul		First post-restoration Archbishop of Glasgow; Chancellor of Glasgow University	
Colin Falconer		Minister and Bishop of Argyll; Bishop of Moray	
Patrick Forbes		Churchman; theologian; Bishop of Aberdeen; chancellor of the University of Aberdeen	
Robert Fleming the elder		Presbyterian Minister; following the Restoration of Charles II, he declined to accept bishops in the Kirk, and was consequently therefore ejected as Minister at Cambuslang	
Alexander Forbes	1585 M.A.	Minister and Bishop of Aberdeen	
Andrew Forman	1483 M.A.	Diplomat and prelate who became Bishop of Moray, Archbishop of Bourges in France and Archbishop of St Andrews	
Henry Forrest	1526 BA	Benedictine Friar who became a martyr in 1533 at St Andrews for his support of Patrick Hamilton	
Peter Francis		Warden; chief librarian of St Deiniol's Library, Hawarden;chaplain of Queen Mary College, London; rector and provost of the St Mary's Cathedral, Glasgow	
George Gledstanes	1580 M.A.	Archbishop of St Andrews	
John Gordon		Prelate, Bishop of Galloway, Abbot of Tongland	
Thomas Goss	M.A.	Anglican priest; Honorary Chaplain to the Queen; Dean of Jersey	
Andrew Gray	1651	Divine and author	
Henry Guthrie	1621	Historian, cleric, Bishop of Dunkeld	
James Guthrie	M.A.	Presbyterian minister who was exempted from the general pardon at the restoration of the monarchy and hanged in Edinburgh	
John Guthrie	1597 M.A.	Prelate, Bishop of Moray	
George Haliburton	1652 M.A. 1673 DD	Cleric, Jacobite, Bishop of Aberdeen	
James Halyburton	1538 M.A.	Protestant reformer	
Thomas Halyburton	1696 M.A.	Minister and divine	
Gavin Hamilton	1584 M.A.	Minister and Bishop of Galloway	
William Hamilton	1952 Th.D.	Theologian and proponent of the Death of God Movement	
George Hargreaves		Minister, politician and leader of the Christian Party	
George Hill	1764 M.A.	Minister of St Andrews; Moderator of the General Assembly of the Church of Scotland; principal of St Mary's College; Dean of the Chapel Royal; Dean of the Order of the Thistle	
John Lauder	1508 licentiate	Minister; Archdeacon of Tweeddale; Scotland's public accuser of heretics	
James Law	1581 M.A.	Minister and Archbishop of Glasgow	
Alexander Leighton	M.A.	Physician, Puritan preacher, pamphleteer, known for his 1630 pamphlet which attacked the Anglican church and led to his torture by Charles I	
David Lindsay	1593 M.A.	Minister, Bishop of Edinburgh, early adopter of the Book of Common Prayer	
Patrick Lindsay	1587 M.A.	Minister, Archbishop of Glasgow, excommunicated for his use of the Book of Common Prayer	
Henry de Lichton	1415 licentiate	Minister, diplomat, Bishop of Glasgow, played a significant role in the rebuilding of St Machar's Cathedral	
David Lindsay	C. 16th century	Minister, Bishop of Ross, and a leader of the Church in Scotland	
Clair Linzey	2004 M.A. PhD	Theologian and animal ethicist	
Thomas Livingston	1415 M.A.	Cleric; diplomat; delegate at the Council of Basel; advisor to James I of Scotland and James II of Scotland	
Gregor MacGregor	1960	Minister, Bishop of Moray, Ross and Caithness in the Scottish Episcopal Church	
John Mantle	1973	Minister, Bishop of Brechin in the Scottish Episcopal Church	
John Maxwell	1611 M.A.	Minister, Bishop of Ross and Archbishop of Tuam	
James Melville	1573	Divine and Protestant reformer	
Iain McHardy	1938	Minister, Dean of Moray, Ross and Caithness in the Scottish Episcopal Church	
Andrew McLellan		Minister, Her Majesty's Chief Inspector of Prisons for Scotland and Moderator of the General Assembly of the Church of Scotland	
William Moodie	1775 (did not graduate)	Minister; academic; Moderator of the General Assembly of the Church of Scotland; professor of Hebrew at Edinburgh University	
Andrew McLellan		Minister; Her Majesty's Chief Inspector of Prisons for Scotland; Moderator of the General Assembly of the Church of Scotland	
Jeanne Audrey Powers		Deacon, elder and leader within The United Methodist Church; vice president of the National Council of Churches of Christ in the USA; representative to the World Council of Churches; advocate for women and LGBTQ+ people in the church	
Robert Reid		Minister; Abbot of Kinloss; Bishop of Orkney; founder of the University of Edinburgh	
William Turnbull	1419	Bishop of Dunkeld; Bishop of Glasgow; founder of and first chancellor the University of Glasgow	
James Aitken Wylie		minister; Protestant historian; professor of theology at the Protestant Institute	

== Royalty and nobility ==
Name	Year/degree	Notability	Reference
William, Prince of Wales	2005	Heir apparent to the British throne. Attended as William Wales.	
Catherine, Princess of Wales	2005	Wife of William, Prince of Wales. Attended under her birth name Catherine (Kate) Middleton.	
Lady Louise Mountbatten-Windsor	2026	Daughter or Prince Edward, Duke of Edinburgh and Sophie, Duchess of Edinburgh.	
Princess Eulalia d'Orléans Bourbon		Granddaughter of Infante Álvaro, Duke of Galliera	

== Sports ==
Name	Year/degree	Notability	Reference
Chris Hoy	1996 (transferred to the University of Edinburgh)	Cyclist; has won world, cycling and Commonwealth competitions; most successful British Olympian in terms of gold medals	
Charles B. Macdonald	1875	Major figure in the development of golf in the United States	
Danny Blanchflower	1945	Northern Ireland international footballer	
J.S. Thomson		Rugby union player who represented Scotland in the first international rugby match	
Alfred Clunies-Ross		Rugby union player who represented Scotland in the first international rugby match	
Robert Munro		Rugby union player who represented Scotland in the first international rugby match	
Findlay S. Douglas	1896	Amateur golfer who won the 1898 U.S. Amateur and was president of the United States Golf Association	
Damian Hopley		Rugby union player for London Wasps and England	
Kim Elgie	1956	Cricketer; represented South Africa; represented Scotland in Rugby union while a student at St Andrews	
Duncan Macrae	1939 MBChB	Rugby union player; represented Scotland and the British and Irish Lions	
R. C. Stevenson	1911 MBChB	Rugby union player; represented Scotland and the British and Irish Lions; also played for Barbarians F.C.	
Cameron Glasgow		Rugby union player, who represented Scotland, Barbarians F.C. and Heriot's Rugby Club	
Tyrone Howe	1993 M.A.	Rugby union player, who represented Ulster, Ireland and the British and Irish Lions	

== Other ==
Name	Year/degree	Notability	Reference
Alexander Berry	1798	Surgeon, merchant and explorer who established the town of Berry, New South Wales, Australia	
Margaret C. Davidson	M.A. 1902	Modern languages teacher, suffragist, volunteer nurse at the Scottish Women's Hospital, France and Girl Guide leader from Dornoch.	
John Honey		Minister; while a student at St Andrews, rescued five drowning men; commemorated in the traditional weekly 'pier walk' at the university	
Elsie Howey	1902 (did not graduate)	Suffragette	
Philippe Cousteau, Jr.	M.A.	Environmental conservationist; grandson of Jacques Cousteau	
Fiona Hukula	Ph.D.	The first Papua New Guinean woman to obtain a PhD in social anthropology	
