= Valentine & Sons =

Photographic studio in Dundee, United Kingdom

- Industry: Printing
- Founded: 1851
- Founder: James Valentine
- Defunct: 1994
- Headquarters: Dundee, Scotland
- Parent: John Waddington Limited (1963-1980); Hallmark Cards (1980-1994)

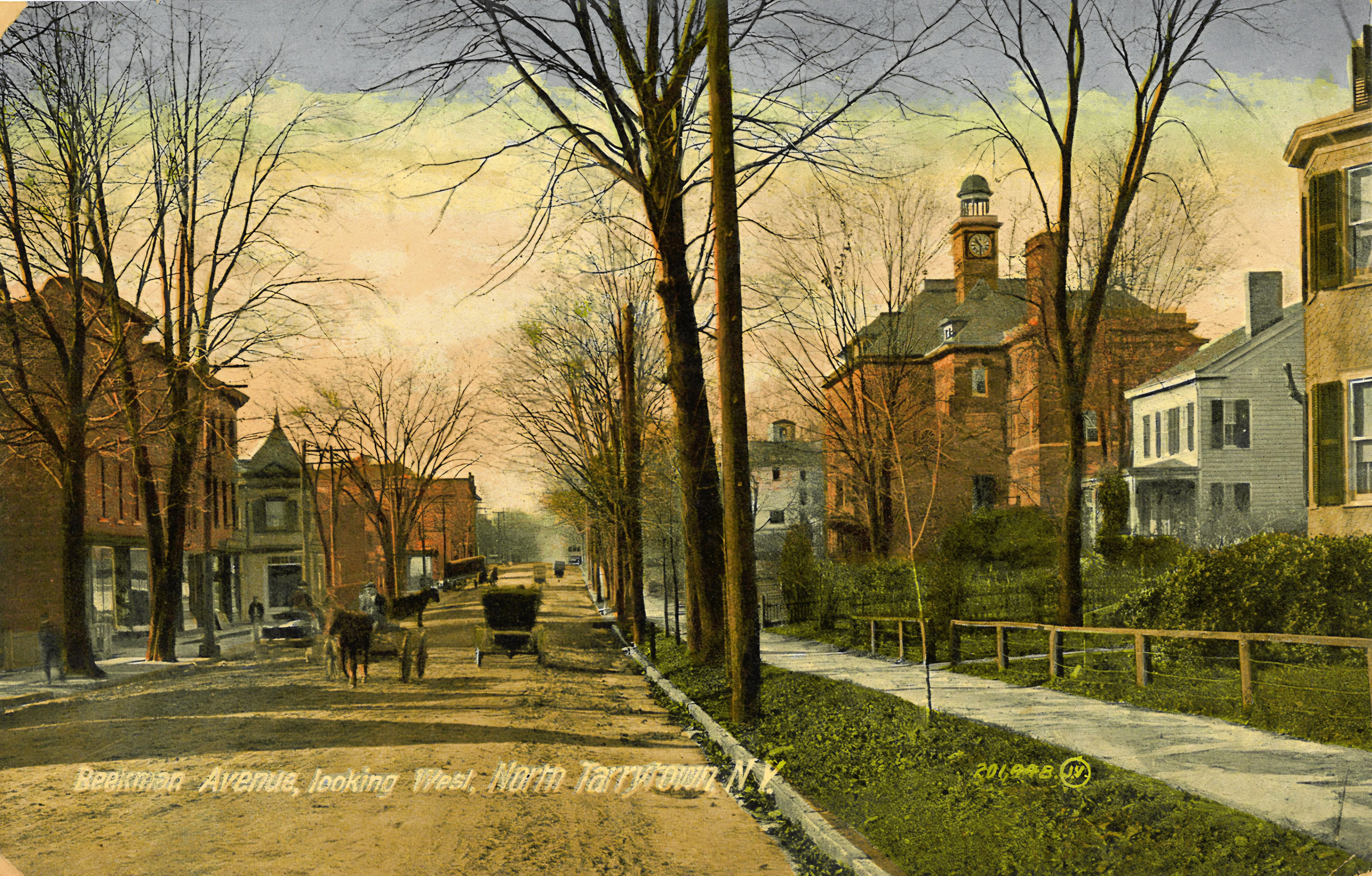
A 1910 Valentine & Sons postcard

Valentine and Sons was a printing company founded in Dundee, Scotland in 1851 by James Valentine (1815–1879), that grew to become Scotland's leading manufacturer of picture postcards.

Following James Valentine's death the company was run by his sons, William Dobson Valentine (1844–1907) and George Valentine (1852–1890).

The company was purchased by John Waddington Limited in 1963, who sold it in turn to Hallmark Cards in 1980. Valentine and Sons' operations ceased in 1994.
