= Richard Oram =

Scottish historian (born 20th century)

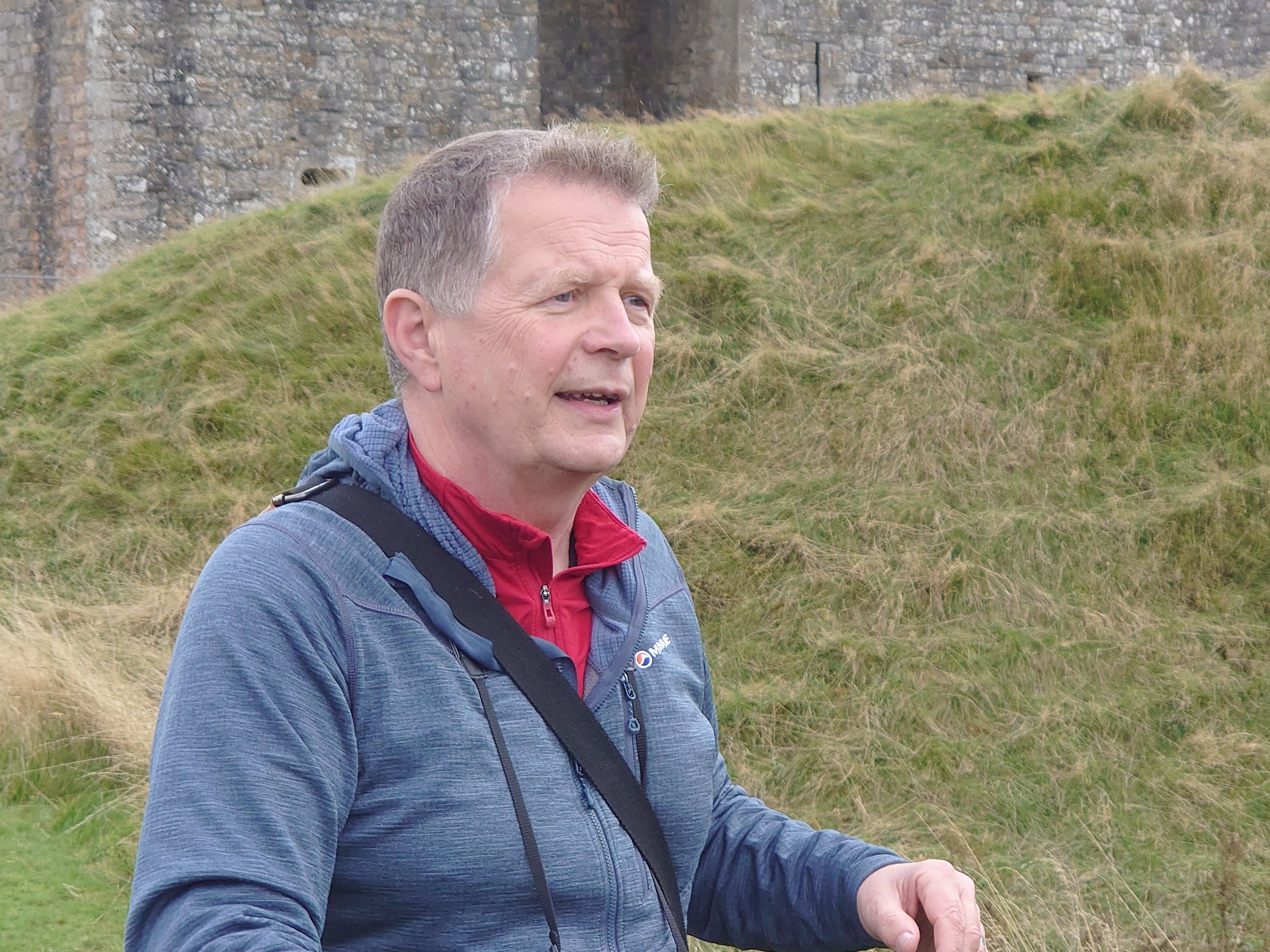
Richard Oram in 2024 at Hermitage Castle, Scotland

Richard D. Oram F.S.A. (Scot.) (born 20th century) is a Scottish historian.

He is a professor of medieval and environmental history at the University of Stirling. Oram is also the director of the Centre for Environmental History and Policy at the University of Stirling.

== Early life and education ==
In 1983, he received a Master of Arts degree in Mediaeval History with Archaeology at the University of St Andrews, where he also carried out his doctoral research, on medieval Galloway.

== Career ==
Oram joined the University of Stirling in September 2002, having previously been an honorary lecturer in history at the University of Aberdeen. In 2000, he published The Lordship of Galloway (Birlinn). He has since written three royal biographies: two of King David I of Scotland (Tempus, 2004; John Donald, 2020), and one of Alexander II of Scotland (John Donald, 2012); as well as the High Medieval volume, volume 3, in the New Edinburgh History of Scotland series, entitled Domination and Lordship: Scotland, 1070–1230 (Edinburgh University Press, 2011).

In June 2014, Oram was appointed president of the Scottish Castles Association, a registered charity. In October 2023, Oram was made a trustee of National Museums Scotland for a four-year term.

== Selected works ==
- (2000) The Lordship of Galloway. John Donald (Birlinn). ISBN 0-85976-541-5 (paperback)
- (2004) David I: The King Who Made Scotland. Tempus. ISBN 0-7524-2825-X
- (2011) Domination and Lordship: Scotland, 1070–1230. Edinburgh University Press. ISBN 978-0-7486-1496-7 (hardback), ISBN 978-0-7486-1497-4 (paperback)
- (2012) Alexander II: King of Scots 1214–1249. John Donald. ISBN 978-0-7486-1497-4 (paperback)
- (2015) "Living on the Level", Architectural Heritage, 36. doi:10.3366/arch.2015.0066
- (2020) David I: King of Scots, 1124–1153. John Donald. ISBN 978-1910900291 (hardback)
- (2024–25) An Environmental History of Scotland. 3 vols. John Donald.
- (2024) Where Men No More May Reap or Sow – The Little Ice Age: Scotland 1400–1850. ISBN 978-0859767170 (hardback)
- (2024) Standing on the Edge of Being: Scotland 1850 to COP 26. ISBN 978-0859767187 (hardback)
- (2025) A Land Won from Waste: Scotland AD 400–1400. ISBN 978-0859767194 (hardback)

=== Collaborations ===
- with Richard Fawcett: (2004) Melrose Abbey. Tempus. ISBN 0-7524-2867-5

== See also ==
- List of alumni of the University of St Andrews
- List of biographers
- List of Scottish writers
- List of University of Aberdeen people
