= Thomas Rodger =

Scottish photographer (1832–1883)

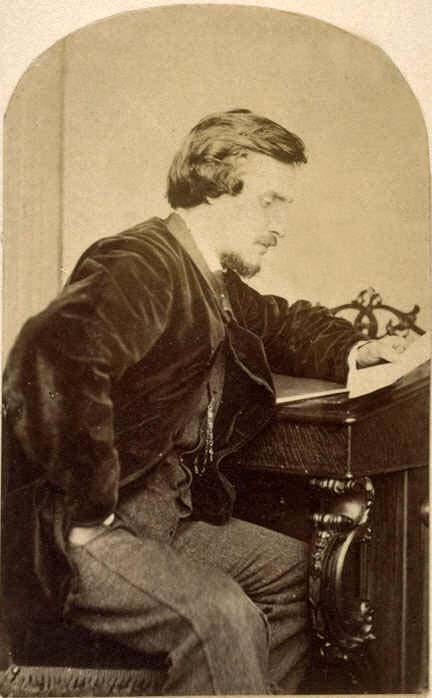
Thomas Rodger, c.1863

Thomas Rodger (18 April 1832 – 6 January 1883) was an early Scottish photographer. He studied at the University of St Andrews and was a protégé of Dr. John Adamson who also persuaded him to become a photographer. At age 14, he was apprenticed to Dr. James, a local chemist and druggist, whilst studying at Madras College. Adamson later taught him the calotype process which he had earlier taught his famous brother, Robert Adamson. Adamson persuaded him to assist Lord Kinnaird in his calotype studio at Rossie Priory. Rodger enrolled at the Andersonian College of Glasgow to study medicine, but Adamson persuaded him to set up a professional business in calotyping in St Andrews.

In 1853, he was awarded the Aberdeen Mechanics' Institution Medal. In 1855, Rodger was awarded the Silver Medal of the Society of the Arts for his paper on Collodion Calotype. He won the Edinburgh Photographic Society Medal in 1856 and the International Photographic Exhibition Medal in 1877. When the Photographic Society of Scotland was established in 1856, Rodger was one of its original members.

Rodger's photographs can mainly be found in the St Andrews University Library and museum. He was also the author of the best known portrait of his master John Adamson in around 1865. Rodger himself was a protégé of Ivan Szabo (1822–1858) in the 1850s, who later opened his own studio in Edinburgh. Rodger was known to attend the Congregational Church at St Andrews, along with James Valentine, whom he probably photographed in around 1850.

There is a blue plaque in his honour in St Andrews outside his house and studio (now the University Careers Centre). It says "The first professional photographer in St. Andrews, he was taught the calotype process by Dr John Adamson, who induced him to make it his life's work. His pictorial record of the town, its people, the fisher folk and eminent visitors, brought him great fame. His favour with visiting royalty gave him journeys to London on Royal Photographic missions. He built this house and in it the first photographic studio in the town. Brewster, the Adamsons and Rodger made St. Andrews a world centre of photography."
