= James Valentine (photographer) =

Scottish photographer (1815–1879)

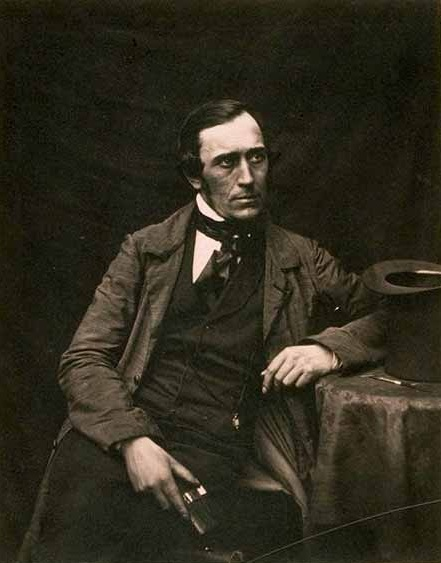
- James Valentine, c.1850, portrait likely by Thomas Rodger
- Born: 12 June 1815; Dundee, Scotland
- Died: 19 June 1879 (aged 64); Dundee, Scotland
- Occupations: Photographer, postcard manufacturer

James Valentine (12 June 1815 – 19 June 1879) was a Scottish photographer. Valentine's of Dundee produced Scottish topographical views from the 1860s, and later became internationally famous as the producers of picture postcards.

== Early life ==
James Valentine was born on 12 June 1815 in Dundee, the second of the five children of John Valentine (1792–1868), linen weaver, and his wife, Mary Valentine née Watson (1790–1867).

Valentine studied photography at the University of St Andrews where he became an acquaintance of Thomas Rodger, who probably photographed him around 1850.

== Career ==
In 1850 Valentine was printing publicity material for the "ocean penny postage" campaign of the activist Elihu Burritt. The business Valentine & Sons Ltd was founded in Dundee in 1851 by Valentine. He added portrait photography to the activities of his established Dundee business, which had been based up to 1851 on the engraving, printing and supply of business stationery. In 1855, he erected one of the largest photographic glasshouses in Britain.

In 1860, he decided to emulate the success of George Washington Wilson in Aberdeen by selling topographical view photographs. In 1866, Valentine carried out his first Royal commission and received the royal warrant in 1867. His organisational and presentational skills were essential in the rapidly expanding and thriving concern which opened a large printing works at 152 and 154 Perth Road, Dundee.

== Personal life ==
On 28 August 1837, he married Christina Marshall (1812–1842), daughter of John Marshall, a shoemaker. After giving birth to their third child in 1841, his wife died on 3 May 1842 of lung disease. The only son of this marriage, John Valentine (1841–1867), became a pioneer photographer in Hawaii.

On 5 December 1843, Valentine married his second wife, Rachel Dobson (1817–1879), in Glasgow.

His son, William Dobson Valentine (1844–1907), took a course in chemistry at the University of London and trained to be a landscape specialist in the studios of Francis Frith at Reigate, Surrey, the largest English publisher of commercial landscape postcards. He entered the family business in about 1860. He was joined in the enterprise by his brother George D. Valentine (1852–1890).

== Portfolios ==
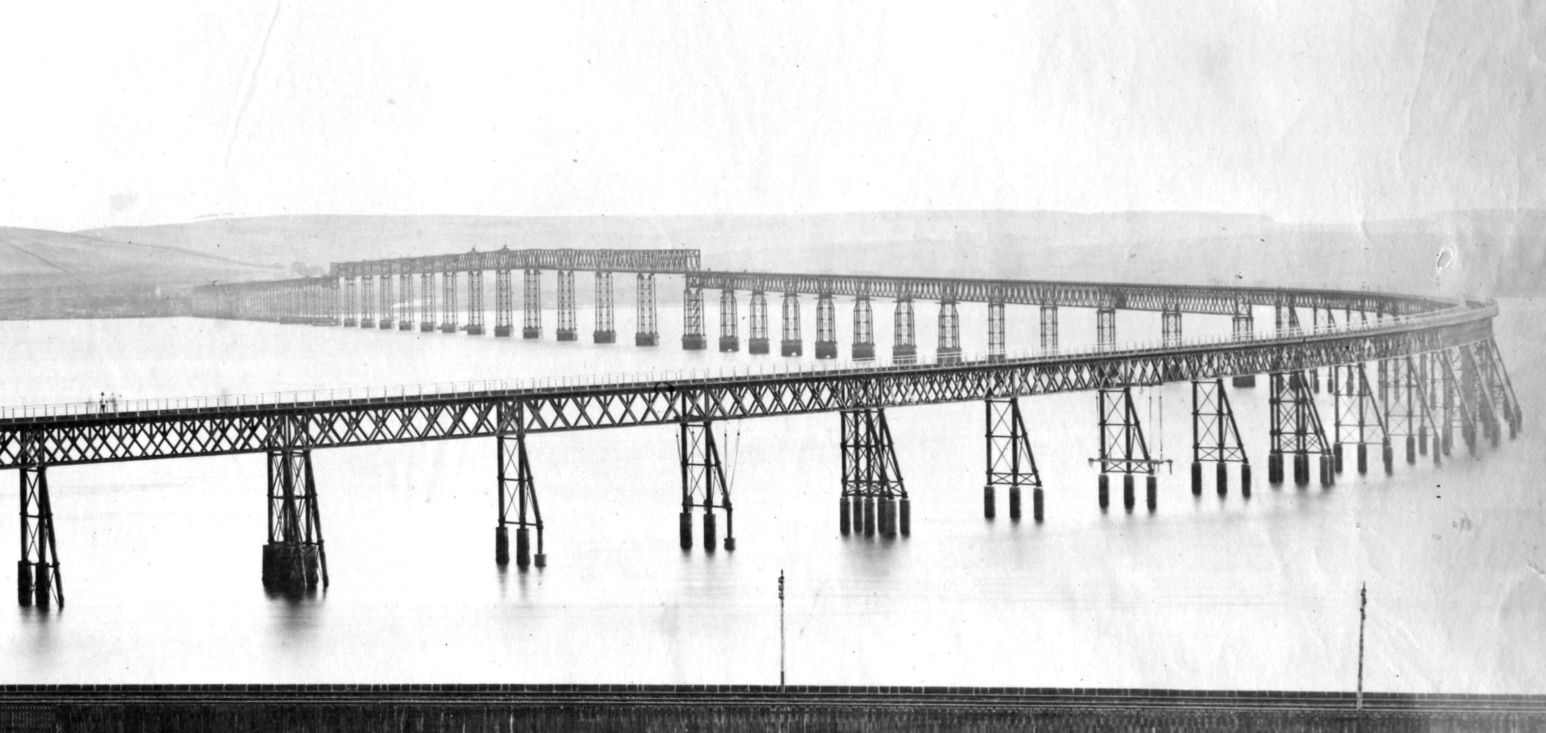
Original Tay Bridge from the north

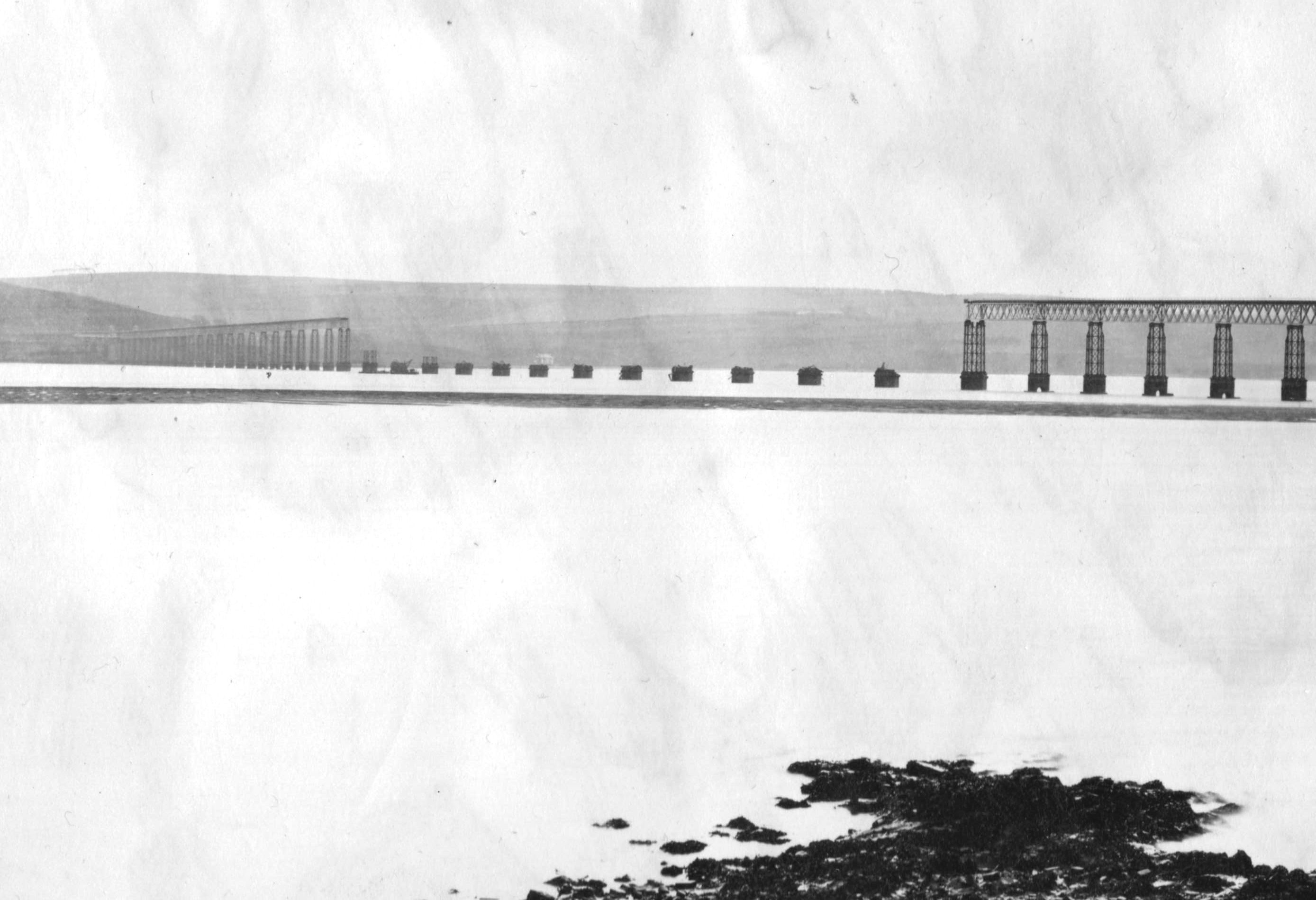
Fallen Tay Bridge from the north

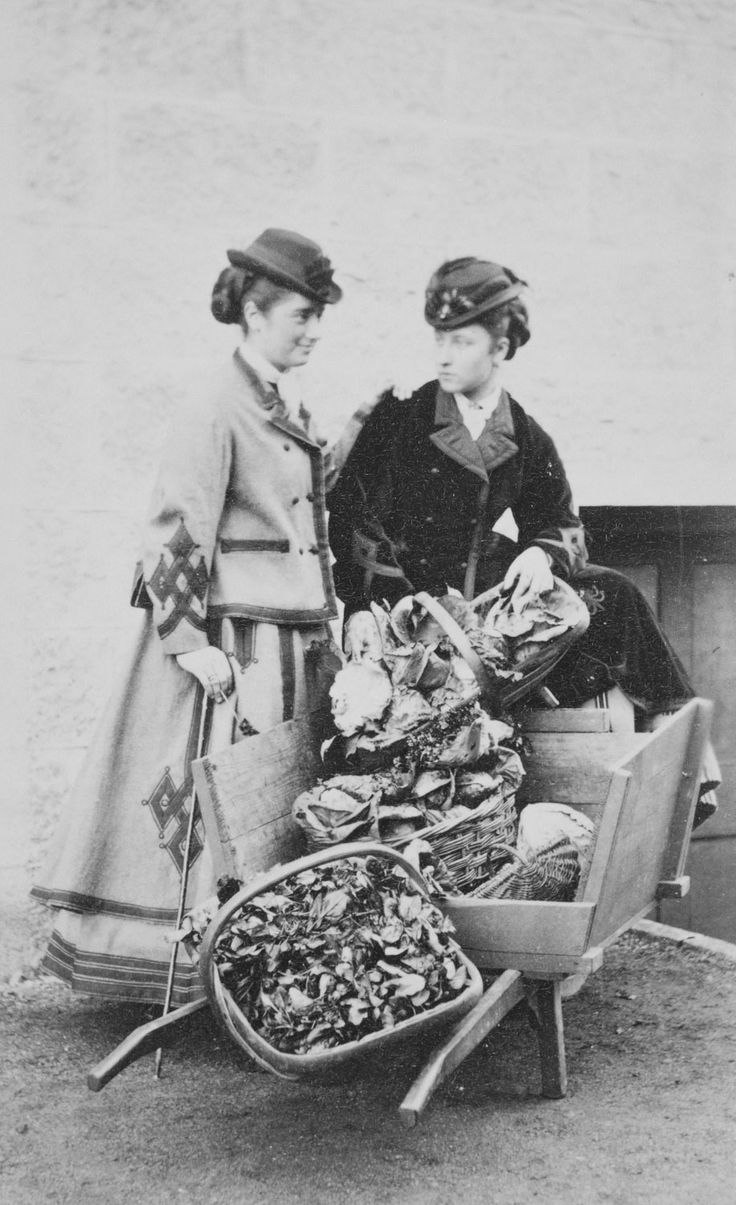
Princess Louise (1848–1939) and Louise van de Weyer by James Valentine, (RCIN 2809757), circa 1866-1870.

Valentine views in the nineteenth century aimed at the national middle and upper class tourist market, with the production of both drawing room albums containing selections of photographs arranged geographically and individual landscape prints. They competed with Francis Frith and George Washington Wilson, who were producing pictures of similar quality. Landscapes were available in a choice of sizes - cabinet, imperial and card. Stereoscopic and magic lantern slide views were also produced. Valentines called themselves 'photographic publishers' and reproduced a great variety of photographic goods as well as the postcards for which they are best known. Subjects concentrated on tourist sights in Scotland, then to England in 1882 and on to fashionable resorts abroad, including Norway, Jamaica, Tangiers, Morocco, Madeira and New Zealand before 1900.

The company became very widely known after the Tay Bridge disaster of 28 December 1879, when they were commissioned to photograph the remains of the bridge for the Court of Inquiry. They recorded over 50 high quality photographs of the debris, and they were used in the court to help witnesses when giving testimony. The pictures were subsequently sold across the country, and used in picture postcards. In 2003, they were re-analysed using digital methods to show how and why the bridge collapsed in such spectacular fashion. The enlargements show numerous defects, especially tapered bolt holes on the critical connections holding the tie bars and struts to the cast iron columns. Failure occurred from these brittle cast iron lugs, and initiated the disaster. Other defects included lack of strengthening girders at the tops of the piers in the high girders section. It was this part of the bridge which was almost completely demolished during the disaster.

The court collection is currently held by Dundee City Library, Another collection of their photographs is held by the University of St Andrews.
