= Robert Adamson (photographer) =

Scottish chemist and photographer (1821-1848)

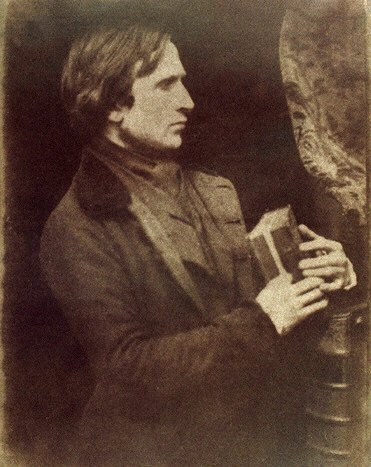
- Robert Adamson
- Born: 26 April 1821; St Andrews, Scotland, United Kingdom
- Died: 14 January 1848 (aged 26); St Andrews, Scotland, United Kingdom
- Years active: 1843−1847
- Known for: Early pioneer of photography

Robert Adamson (26 April 1821 – 14 January 1848) was a Scottish chemist and pioneer photographer at Hill & Adamson. He is best known for his pioneering photographic work with David Octavius Hill and producing some 2500 calotypes, mostly portraits, within 5 years after being hired by Hill in 1843.

== Early years ==
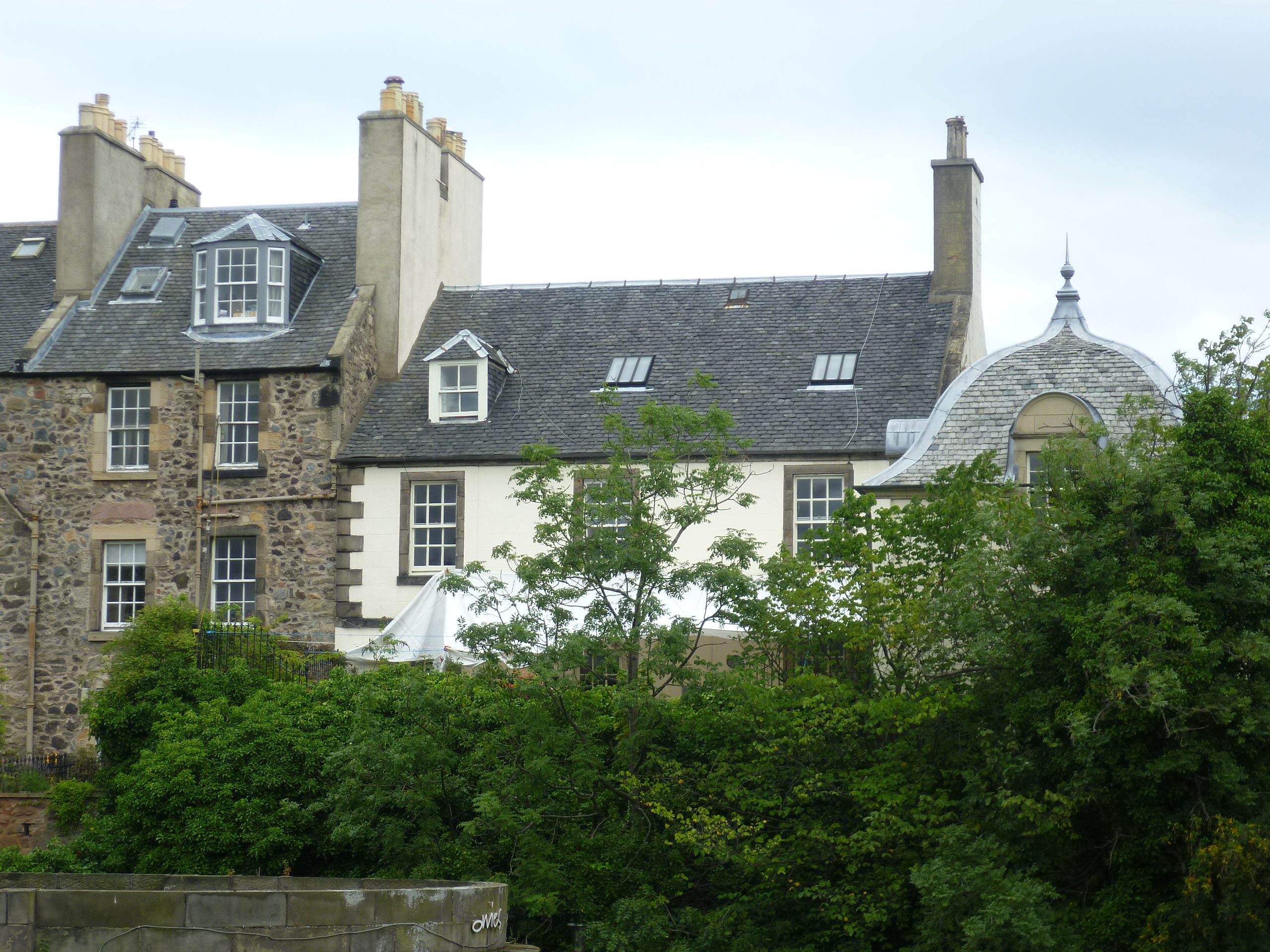
Rock House.

Adamson was born in St Andrews, one of ten children of Rachel Melville and Alexander Adamson, a Fife tenant farmer. He grew up in Burnside and was educated at Madras College in St Andrews where he showed exceptional talents in mathematics and mechanics, twice winning the prize for mathematics. He became employed at an engineering shop from a young age, and apprenticed as a millwright for several months.

== Career ==
Adamson was keen on becoming an engineer, but ill health led to him pursuing photography. He was taught calotype by his brother, John, and by the physicist David Brewster of the University of St Andrews in the late 1830s. As early as April 1839, Adamson's talents were recognized, and Fox Talbot, the inventor of the calotype, would call his pictures "Rembrandtish". Adamson's brother John, a general practitioner, lecturer, and curator of the University Museum, produced the first calotype in Scotland in 1841.

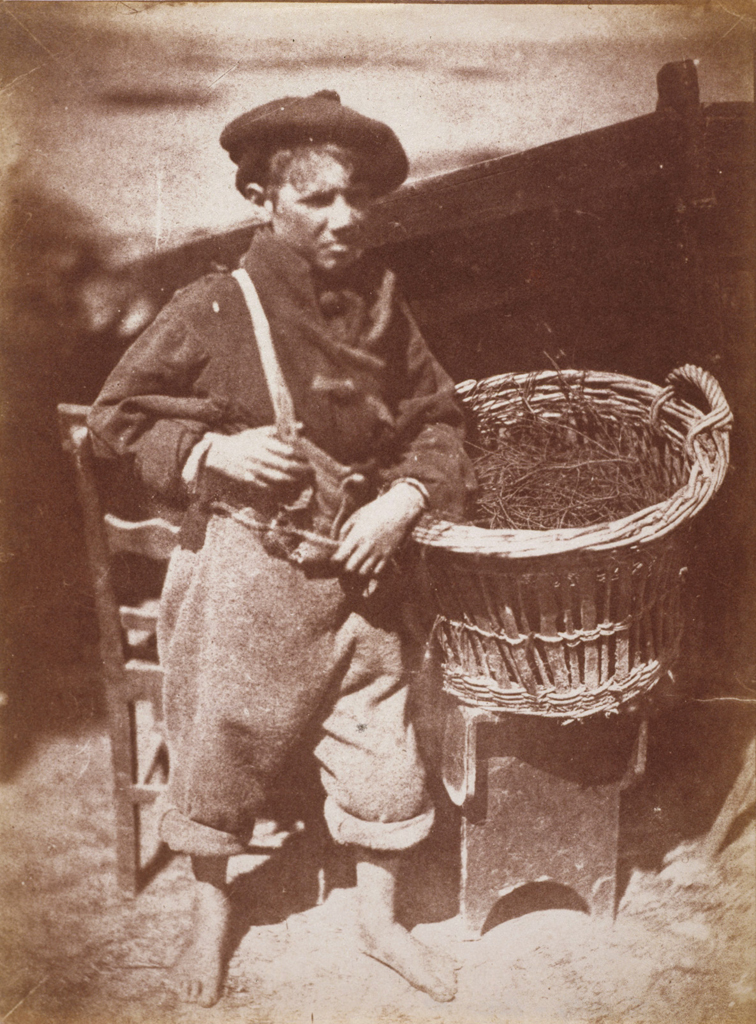
'His Faither's Breeks', a Newhaven boy, by Robert Adamson and David Octavius Hill, 1843–1847; from the collection of the National Galleries of Scotland.

The young chemist, Adamson, established his photographic studio at Rock House, Calton Hill Stairs in Edinburgh, on 10 May 1843. In June, Brewster recommended Adamson to David Octavius Hill (1802–1870), a painter of romantic Scottish landscapes, who hired him; and they were commissioned in 1843 to make a group portrait of the 470 clergymen who founded the Free Church of Scotland. Hill had desired to make photographic portraits of the founders purely as reference material. This painting, however, would not be completed until 1866, long after his death.

The first studio specializing in calotypes in Edinburgh, Adamson's studio practice was said to have been "confidential to the point of secrecy". Hill required calotypes from which he would paint. Distinguished persons from many fields came to be photographed by the partners and within a few years they had taken the art scene by storm in Scotland. Together they made around 2500 portraits, some say 3000 or more, and numerous views of Edinburgh between 1843 and 1848, exhibiting in 1844, 1845 and 1846. Their prints were sold at the Princes Street gallery of Alexander Hill. After Hill and Adamson decided to publish their work, they purchased a specialised camera in 1844, but their plans to produce albums, paid by subscription, did not gain traction.

Their depictions, in soft reddish-brown or sepia, included local and Fife landscapes and urban scenes, including images of the Scott Monument, under construction in Edinburgh. They produced several groundbreaking "action" photographs of soldiers and – perhaps their most famous photograph – two priests walking side by side. Their depictions of groups and children were unrivaled. As well as the great and the good, they photographed ordinary working folk, particularly the fishermen of Newhaven and their wives. Their social documentary series on Newhaven fishing families, which depicted living conditions and community relationships, was to be the most notable work of the partnership.

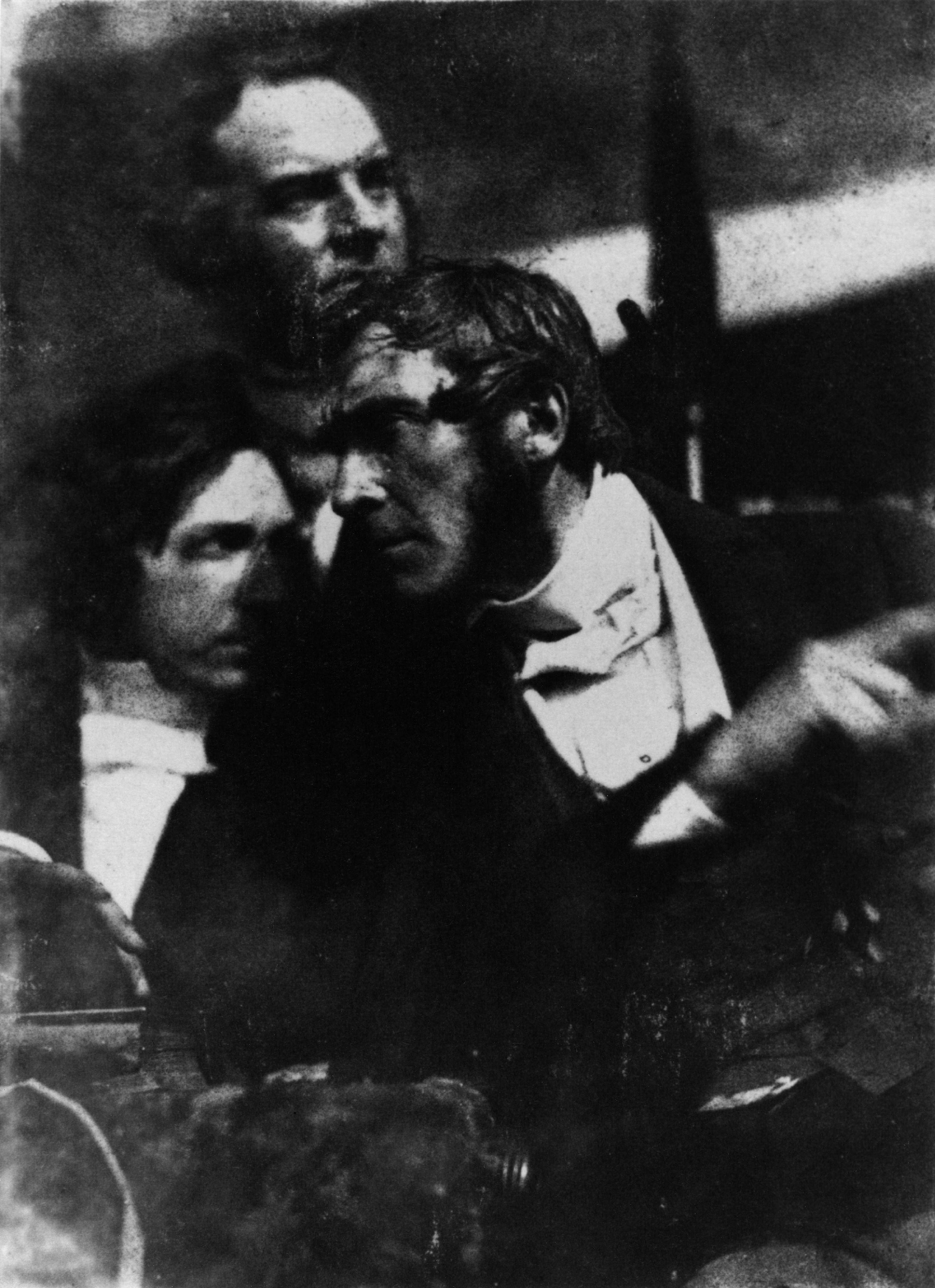
Graham Fyvie, Robert Cadell and Robert Cunningham Graham Spiers, by Robert Adamson.

By mid-1847, the studio stopped production due to the failing health of Adamson. Thinking to recuperate amidst his family, Adamson returned to St Andrews. He died of tuberculosis on 14 January 1848, at the age of 26.

In 1851, the works of Hill & Adamson's appeared at The Great Exhibition. Hill returned to painting, but it wasn't until 1872 that their work was rediscovered. In 1905, 1912, and 1914, some of their works appeared in Camera Work. There were also several New York City exhibits at Alfred Stieglitz's 291 Art Gallery and at the National Arts Club.

== Partial works ==
- Miss Justine Munro
- Miss Grizzel Baillie, Scotland
- Mrs. Barbara (Johnstone) Flucker Opening Oysters
- Bringing in the catch
- Officer of the 92nd Gordon Highlanders Reading to the Troops, Edinburgh Castle
- The Fairy Tree at Colinton
- The Gowan
- The Minnow Pool
- The Rev. Dr. Jabez Bunting, Scotland
- Dumbarton Presbytery
- Willie Liston Redding the Line

== In fiction ==
Rock House and Adamson feature in Sara Sheridan's novel The Secrets of Blythswood Square (2024) set in 1846. In the book, Hill and Adamson's fictional assistant, Ellory Mann sets up her own photographic studio in Glasgow.
