= Richard Fawcett =

British art historian and academic

Professor Richard Fawcett, OBE, FSA, FRSE, (fl. 1974 - died 31 October 2023) was an English academic, a historian of medieval architecture and art, specialising in English and Scottish subject matter.

After his PhD on late medieval architecture in Norfolk, in 1974 he began to work at the Inspectorate of Ancient Monuments of Historic Scotland. He was elected Fellow of the Society of Antiquaries of London on 3 March 1979. In 2008, he was appointed OBE.

He died on 31 October 2023 in Kirkcaldy, Fife, and was cremated on 24 November after a service St Peter's Episcopal Church, Kirkcaldy, on Friday.

== Select publications ==
- The Architecture and Furnishings of Norfolk Churches (Norfolk Society, 1974)
- Scottish Architecture : from the Accession of the Stewarts to the Reformation 1371-1560 (Edinburgh University Press, 1994)
- Scottish Abbeys and Priories (Historic Scotland, 1994)
- Scottish Cathedrals (Historic Scotland, 1997)
- The Architecture of the Scottish Medieval Church (Yale University Press, 2011)
