= Stephen Haliczer =

American historian

Stephen Haliczer is an American historian of Spain, Italy, and the Catholic Church during the Early Modern era. He is a professor of history at Northern Illinois University. Haliczer's undergraduate work was done at Bard College and his graduate work at St. Andrews University. His study of Early Modern Spain has received praise from a variety of other historians, such as Joseph Pérez. In his books, Haliczer holds to the structural functionalist school of historical thought.

In 2006, he released an educational board game Vatican: Unlock the Secrets of How Men Become Pope. Based on his research, the game attempts to show the process of selecting a Pope as players first maneuver for position, then vie to be named the new Pope upon the previous Pope's death.

== Works ==
Books:

- The Castilian Urban Patriciate and the Jewish Expulsions of 1480-92. Washington, D.C.: American Historical Society. 1973.
- The Comuneros of Castile: The Forging of a Revolution, 1475-1521. Madison, Wisconsin: University of Wisconsin Press. 1981. ISBN 0-299-08500-7.
- Inquisition and Society in Early Modern Europe. London, U. K.: Croom Helm. 1986.
- Inquisition and Society in the Kingdom of Valencia, 1478-1834. Berkeley, California: University of California Press. 1990.
- Sexuality in the Confessional: A Sacrament Profaned. New York, NY: Oxford University Press. 1996.
- The Jews of Spain and the Expulsion of 1492. Lancaster, Calif.: Labyrinthos. 1997. (with coauthor Moshe Lazar)
- Between Exaltation and Infamy: Female Mystics in the Golden Age of Spain. New York, NY: Oxford University Press. 2002.

The books concerning the history of Spain have had Spanish-language editions published. Haliczer has written a variety of articles in journals as well.
