= William Richmond (biochemist) =

Scottish biochemist and medical researcher

William Richmond (21 November 1941 in Springfield, Fife – 18 August 2010 in Advie) was a Scottish biochemist and medical researcher, best known for developing a new method for testing blood cholesterol. This test has come to be known as the Richmond test. After leaving school, he studied Chemistry at St. Andrews University. His first job was at Victoria Hospital, Kirkcaldy. He later worked in London, and spent most of his working life working in hospitals there, such as St. Mary's Hospital, Paddington. His research, funded by the Medical Research Council, led to the development of a new test for cholesterol in 1973. This test has since been widely used to test for cholesterol levels globally. He died on holiday in an accident while fishing on the Spey. He composed music for the bagpipes.
