= Charles Bisset =

Scottish physician and military engineer (1717–1791)

Charles Bisset (1717–1791) was a Scottish physician and military engineer. He studied medicine at Edinburgh; was second surgeon of the military hospital, Jamaica, 1740; served in Admiral Vernon's fleet; returned to England, 1745; was ensign in the 42nd Highlanders, 1746; prepared reports of the defences of Bergen-Op-Zoom; and was engineer-extraordinary in the engineer brigade. He afterwards practised medicine at Skelton, Yorkshire. He published works on military fortifications and on medical subjects.

== Early life and education ==
Charles Bisset was the second child of Thomas Bisset, who was a lawyer of local repute for his attainments in Latin and in Scots law, Commissary of Dunkeld, and Baron-Baillie to the Duke of Athol. Charles Bisset was born at Glenalbert, near the village of Dalguise, Dunkeld, Perthshire, in 1717. He studied medicine at Edinburgh, and in 1740 was appointed second surgeon of the military hospital, Jamaica.

== Military career ==
He afterwards served on board Admiral Vernon's fleet, by some accounts as a naval surgeon, and by others as surgeon of one of the marine regiments subsequently disbanded. After spending five years in the West Indies and America he returned home in ill-health in 1745. In May 1746 he obtained an ensigncy in the 42nd Highlanders, then commanded by Lord John Murray, with which corps he served in the unsuccessful descent on the French coast near L'Orient in September the same year. After wintering with his regiment at Limerick, he accompanied it to the Low Countries, where it was first engaged at Sandberg, near Hulst, in Dutch Flanders, in April 1747, during the War of the Austrian Succession. A military sketch of this affair, and another of the defences of Bergen-op-Zoom, drawn by him, having been submitted by Lord John Murray to the Duke of Cumberland, Bisset was ordered to the latter fortress to prepare reports of the progress of the siege. For his brave and skilful performance of this duty he was recommended by the Duke of Cumberland for the post of engineer-extraordinary in the brigade of engineers attached to the army, in which capacity he served with credit during the remainder of the war. At the peace of 1748 the engineer brigade was broken up, and Bisset was placed on half-pay as a lieutenant of the reduced additional companies of Lord John Murray's Highlanders, under which heading his name appeared in the annual army lists up to his death. After travelling in France he published his Theory and Construction of Fortifications, with plans, 4to (London, 1751).

== Medical career and publications ==
He subsequently reverted to the medical profession, and went into practice at the village of Skelton, near Cleveland, Yorkshire, where he continued during the rest of his life. When war threatened in 1755, he published his Treatise on Scurvy, with remarks on Scorbutic Ulcers, 8vo (dedicated to the Lords of the Admiralty); and in 1762 he brought out An Essay on the Medical Constitution of Great Britain, to which is added Observations on the Weather and the Diseases which appeared during the period from 1st January 1758 to the summer solstice of 1760. Together with an account of the Throat Distemper and Miliary Fever which were epidemic in 1760 (London, 8vo). This work, to which was also appended a paper on the properties of bear's-foot (hellebore) as a vermifuge, was translated into German by J. G. Moeller (Breslau, 1779).

In 1766 the University of St. Andrews conferred on Bisset the degree of Doctor of Medicine, and the same year he published Medical Essays and Observations (Newcastle-on-Tyne, 8vo), of which a German translation by Moeller was published in 1781, and an Italian one about 1790.

Bisset also wrote several minor works on medical subjects, and is stated to have published a small treatise on naval tactics and some political essays. A manuscript treatise by him on Permanent and Temporary Fortifications and the Attack and Defence of Temporary Defensive Works, which is dedicated to George, Prince of Wales, and dated 1778, is preserved in the British Library. Bisset presented to the Leeds Infirmary a manuscript of observations for his Medical Constitution of Great Britain, extending over 700 pages, all traces of which are now lost according to the Leeds Philosophical Society. A copy of Cullen's First First of Practice of Physic, with numerous manuscript notes by him, is preserved in the library of the London Medical Society. An interesting medical correspondence between Bisset and Lettsom is published in Pettigrew’s Memoirs and Correspondence of Dr. Lettsom.

Some of his works are held in the historical archives of the Wellcome Library, the Owen H. Wangensteen Historical Library of Biology and Medicine at the University of Minnesota, and the Royal College of Physicians and Surgeons of Glasgow.

== Death and legacy ==
Bisset, who was described as thin in person and of weakly habit, had a very extensive country practice in which he amassed an ample fortune. He died at Knayton, near Thirsk, on 14 June 1791, in his seventy-fifth year. He was survived by his wife, Ann, and two daughters.

== Historiography ==
The Dutch episode of Bisset's military career (especially the siege of Bergen op Zoom) is the subject of a historical monograph published in 2017 in Czech, "Blood, honour and horror", by historian Petr Wohlmuth, who also draws extensively on several Bisset daily reports from the siege, preserved in the British National Archives and Royal Archives. Wohlmuth later published a study analysing Bisset's proposed innovations in the field of military engineering and the design and defence of bastioned fortifications („Poručík proti maršálovi. Dvojí výzva post-vaubanovské tradici v textech skotského vojenského inženýra Charlese Bisseta z let 1751–1778“ - Lieutenant versus Marshal. Double Challenge to Post-Vaubanian Tradition in the Texts of Scottish Military Engineer Charles Bisset, 1751–1778).

== Bibliography ==
- Chichester, Henry Manners (1886). "Bisset, Charles" . In Stephen, Leslie (ed.). Dictionary of National Biography. Vol. 5. London: Smith, Elder & Co. p. 99.
- Wohlmuth, Petr. Krev, čest a hrůza. Historická antropologie pevnostní války na příkladu britských deníků z obléhání pevnosti Bergen op Zoom z roku 1747. Prague: Scriptorium, 2017. (480 p.) (Blood, honour and horror. Historical anthropology of siege warfare as evidenced by siege journals of British defenders of Bergen op Zoom in 1747). Incl. English resume.
- Wohlmuth, Petr. „Poručík proti maršálovi. Dvojí výzva post-vaubanovské tradici v textech skotského vojenského inženýra Charlese Bisseta z let 1751-1778“. In Theatrum historiae 24/2019, 137–171. Pardubice: Fakulta filozofická, Univerzita Pardubice, 2019. (Lieutenant versus Marshal. Double Challenge to Post-Vaubanian Tradition in the Texts of Scottish Military Engineer Charles Bisset, 1751–1778). Incl. English resume.
