= Fiona Hukula =

Papua New Guinean anthropologist

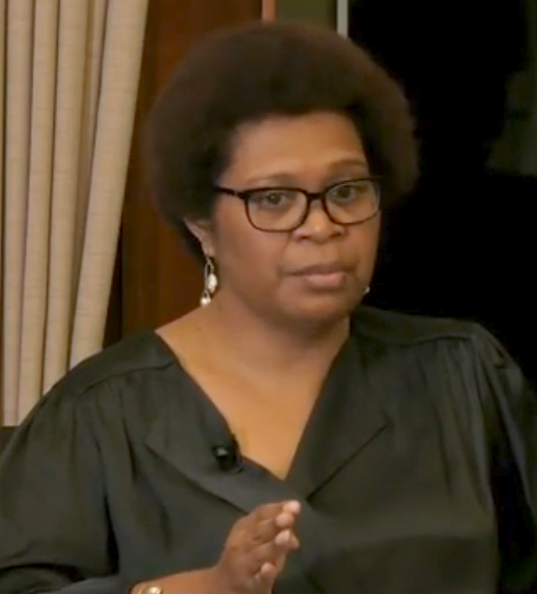
- At a Lowy Institute panel discussion in 2024
- Born: Fiona Sonia Karejo Hukula; 1977 (age 48–49); Port Moresby, Papua New Guinea
- Education: Victoria University of Wellington; University of Sheffield; University of St Andrews
- Occupations: Anthropologist; Women's rights activist
- Spouse: Simon Kenema

Fiona Sonia Karejo Hukula (born 1977) is a Papua New Guinean activist. She advocates against gender-based violence, including women accused of witchcraft or sorcery.

== Personal life and education ==
Hukula was born in Port Moresby from East Sepik Province. She currently lives in Port Moresby.

After graduating with a bachelor's degree in anthropology from Victoria University of Wellington in New Zealand, Hukula went on to obtain her master's degree in international criminology from the University of Sheffield in the United Kingdom. Hukula's PhD, which she received from the University of St Andrews in social anthropology, focused on the ethnology of a settlement in Nine Mile, Port Moresby. Hukula was the first Papua New Guinean woman to obtain a PhD in social anthropology.

== Career ==
In 1998, Hukula was employed by the Papua New Guinea National Research Institute (PNGNRI) as a project research officer. She went on to become a senior research fellow, and led its Building Safer Communities programme.

Through her role in the PNGNRI, Hukula served on several governmental committees, including the Family and Sexual Violence Action Committee and the National Action Plan against Sorcery Accusation and Related Violence. As of October 2020, Hukula is serving her second four-year term as deputy chairperson and commissioner of the Constitutional and Law Reform Commission of Papua New Guinea.

Hukula left the PNGNRI in 2021 to work in Suva, Fiji as a gender specialist for the Pacific Islands Forum Secretariat.

== Recognition ==
Hukula was awarded the Royal Anthropological Society's Sutasoma Award in 2012.
