= George Valentine (photographer) =

Scottish photographer (1852–1890)

George Dobson Valentine (1852–1890) was a Scottish photographer.

== Life ==
He was the eighth child of the Scottish photographer James Valentine, with his second wife Rachel Dobson. He went into the family photographic business in Dundee.

Serious ill-health led Valentine to take a world cruise, reaching New Zealand, in 1882/3. On medical advice he returned to New Zealand, arriving at Auckland in January 1884, followed the next month by his wife and two children. They went to live in Nelson, South Island. He continued with his career of photography and produced a significant body of work.

== Works ==
Valentine produced many of what were to become the classic iconic images of early New Zealand, including geyser studies in the thermal region and studies of New Zealand bush and waterfalls. His work is represented in the Museum of New Zealand Te Papa Tongarewa and the Auckland Art Gallery.

Initially Valentine took views of Nelson. In 1885 he photographed the Pink and White Terraces and, after the destruction of the area by the 1886 eruption of Mount Tarawera, photographed the area again, creating a record of this natural disaster. (The Pink and White Terrace locations were finally mapped in 2017 after a lost 1859 survey was recovered and analysed.) In this first series of works, Valentine also covered Lake Rotomahana.

After moving back to Auckland, Valentine photographed the Cook Islands, Tahiti and Tonga on a cruise. In 1889 he took photographs at the Waitomo Caves.

== Death ==
Valentine died on 26 February 1890, aged 37, at Balgay, Auckland.

== Family ==
Valentine married in 1876 Wilhelmina Arnot Stirling Smith. In Scotland they had two daughters, Margaret and Mary, and a son James, the elder daughter Margaret dying young. A second son, Arnot, was born in Nelson in 1885.

Of the sons, James Valentine (1879/80–1920) became a schoolmaster. He married in 1908 Ragna Amundsen, eldest daughter of Engebert Amundsen of Christiania (now Oslo). The RAF Wing-Commander George Engrebret Valentine DSO (1909–1940) was their son. James Valentine taught at Keswick Grammar School, and St George's School, Harpenden, before becoming headmaster of Harwich County School, dying in that post.

== Gallery ==
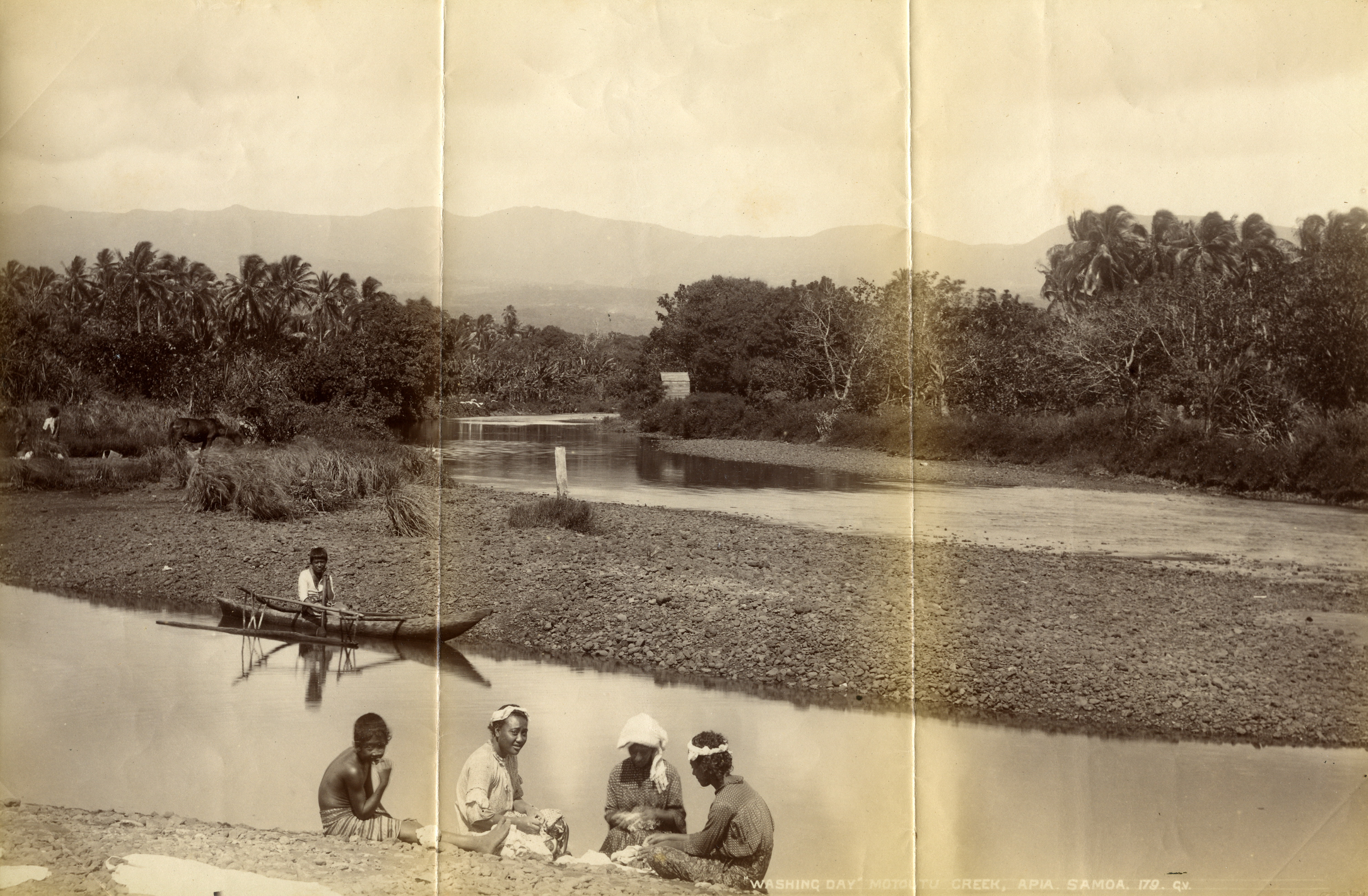
'Washing Day' at Motoutu Creek, Apia, Samoa, 1887

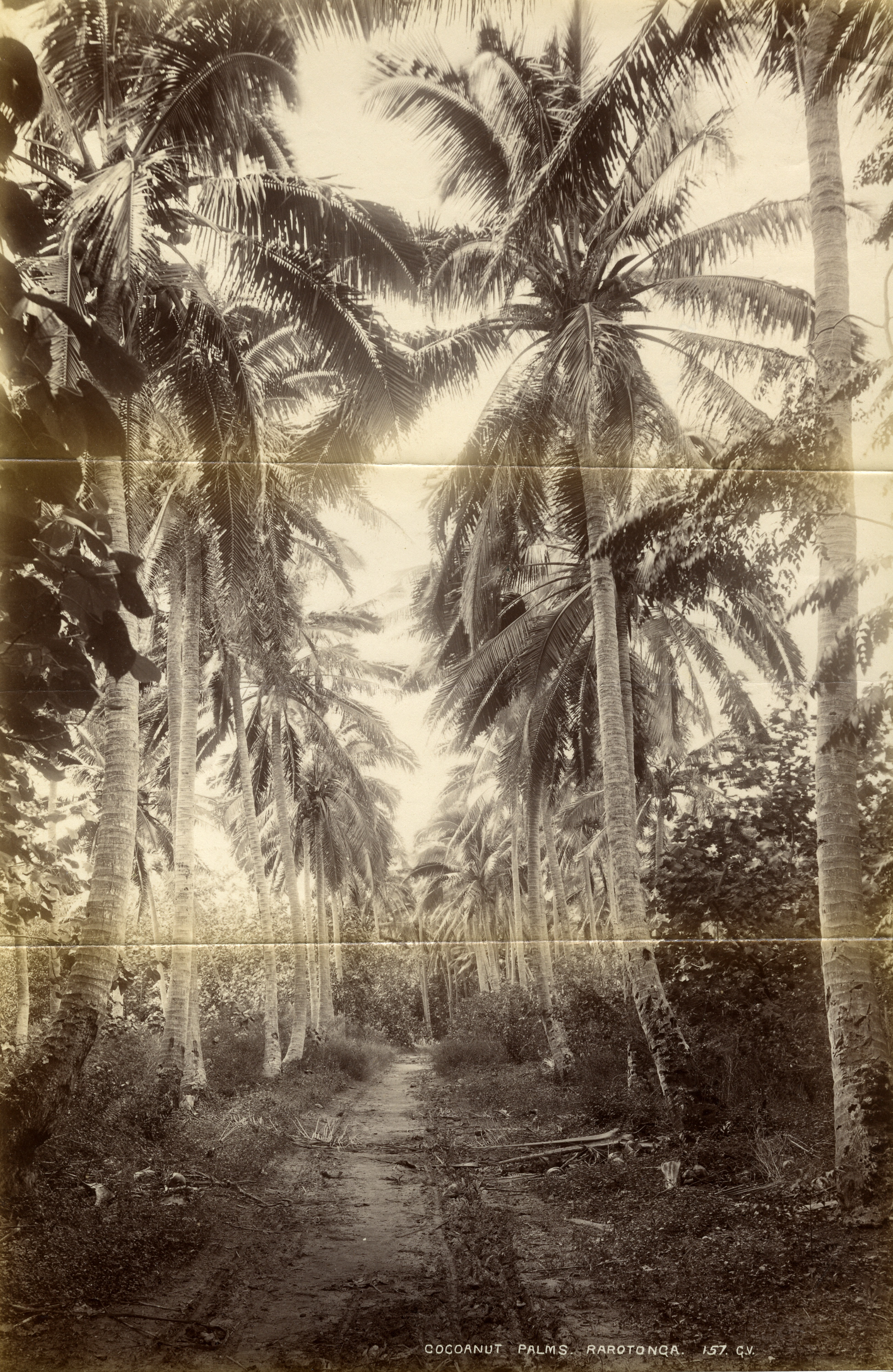
Coconut Palms, Rarotonga, 1887

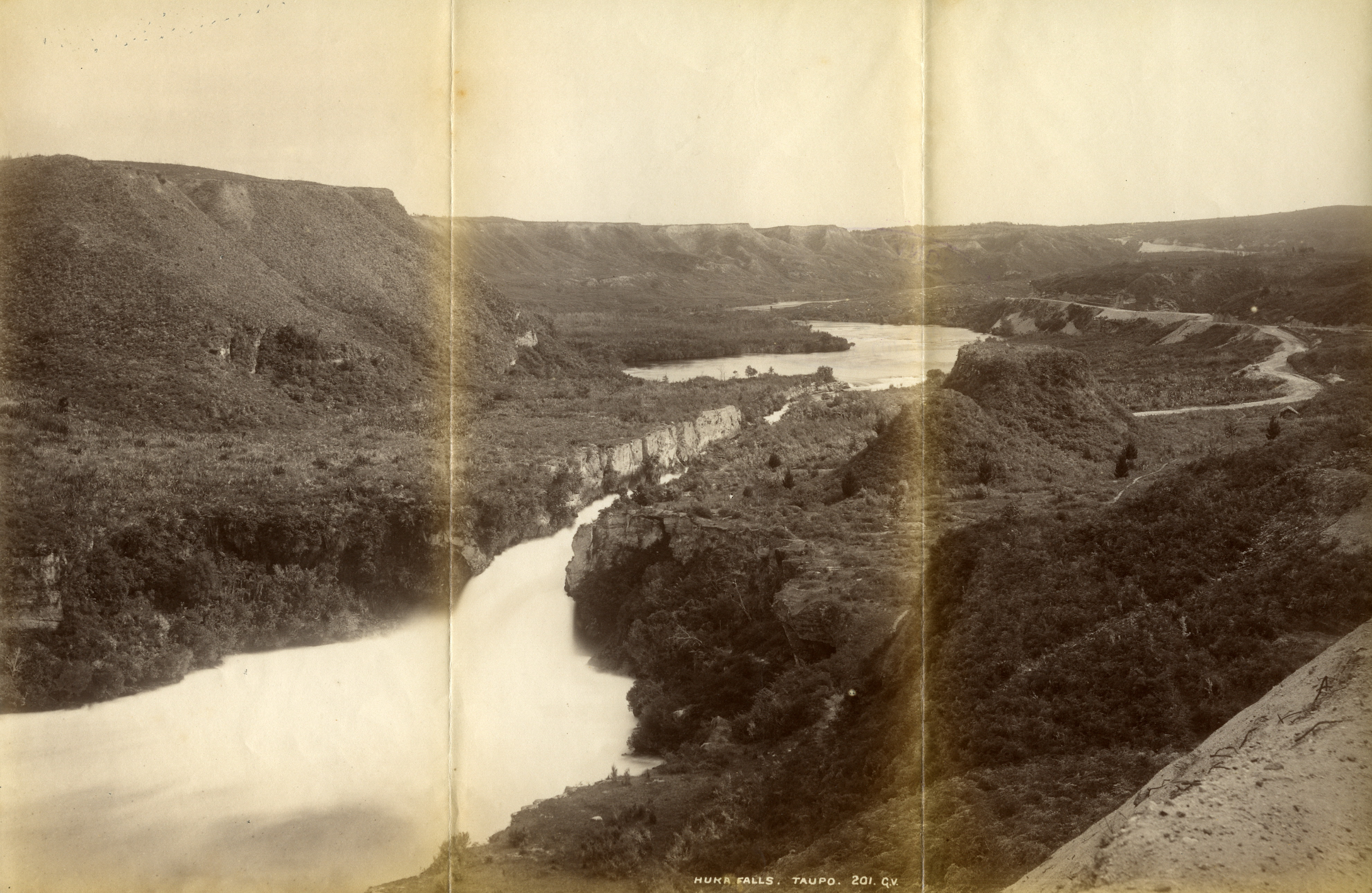
Huka Falls, Taupo, 1887

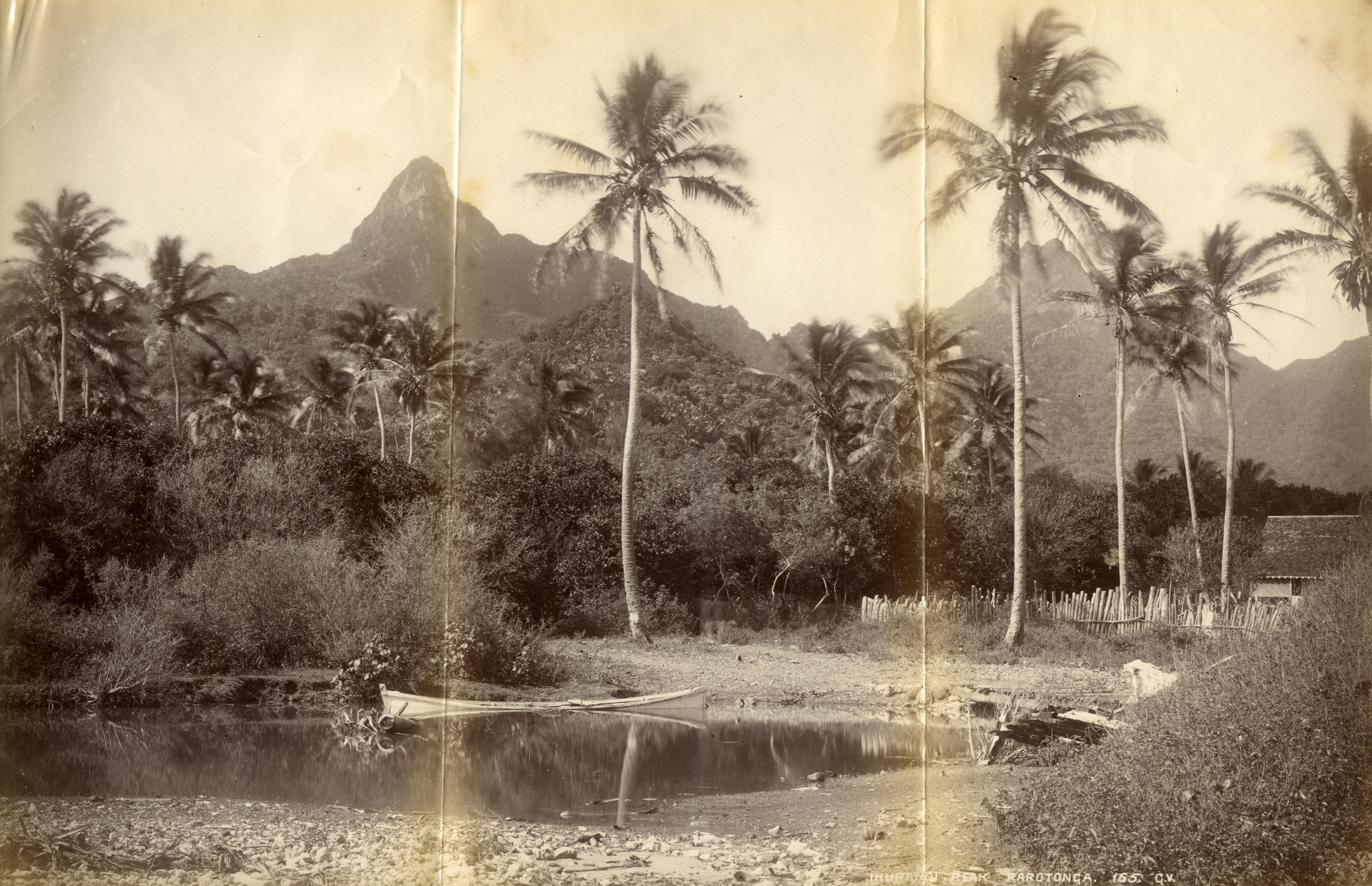
Ikurangi Peak, Rarotonga, 1887

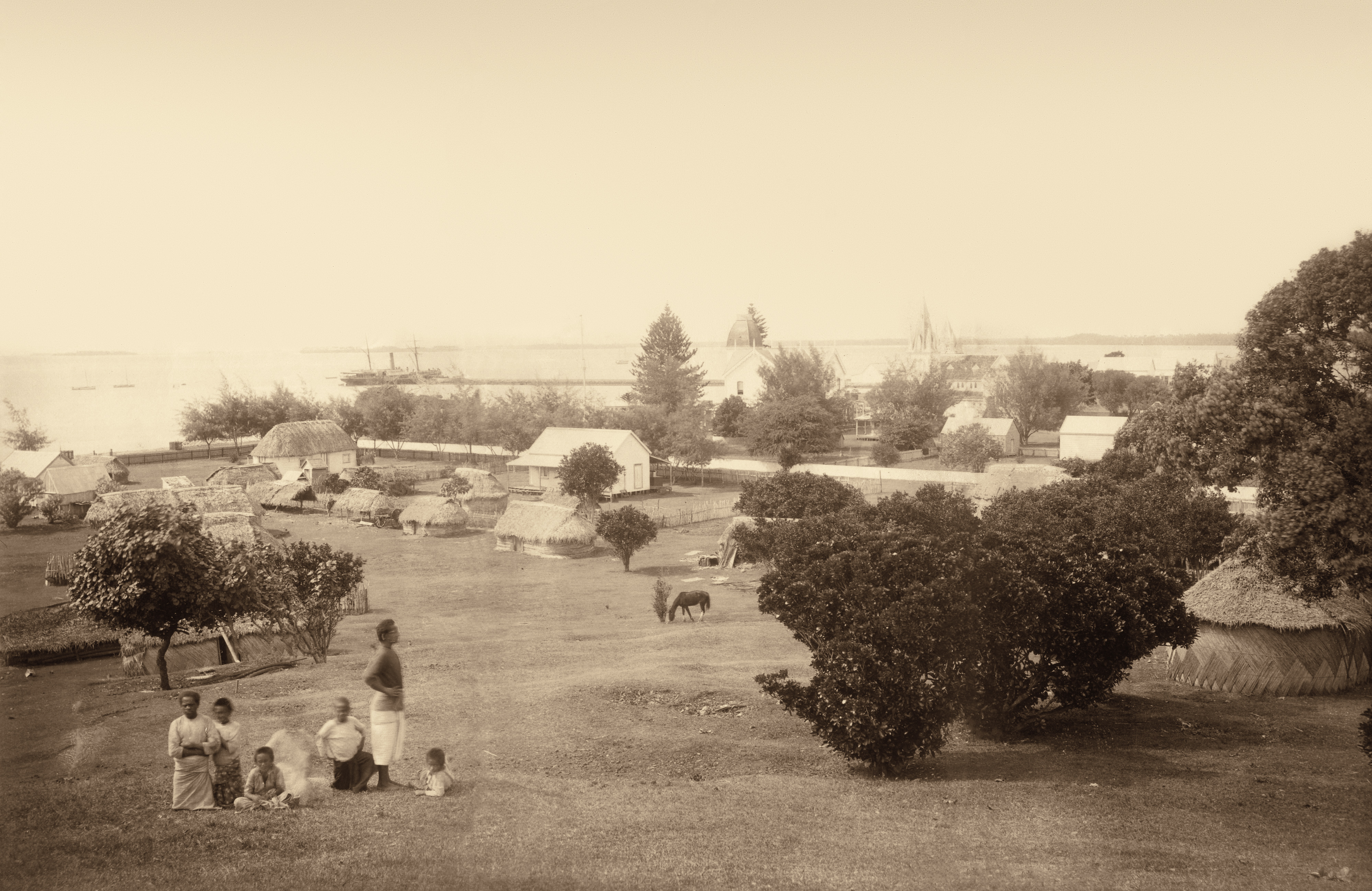
Nukualofa, Tonga, 1887

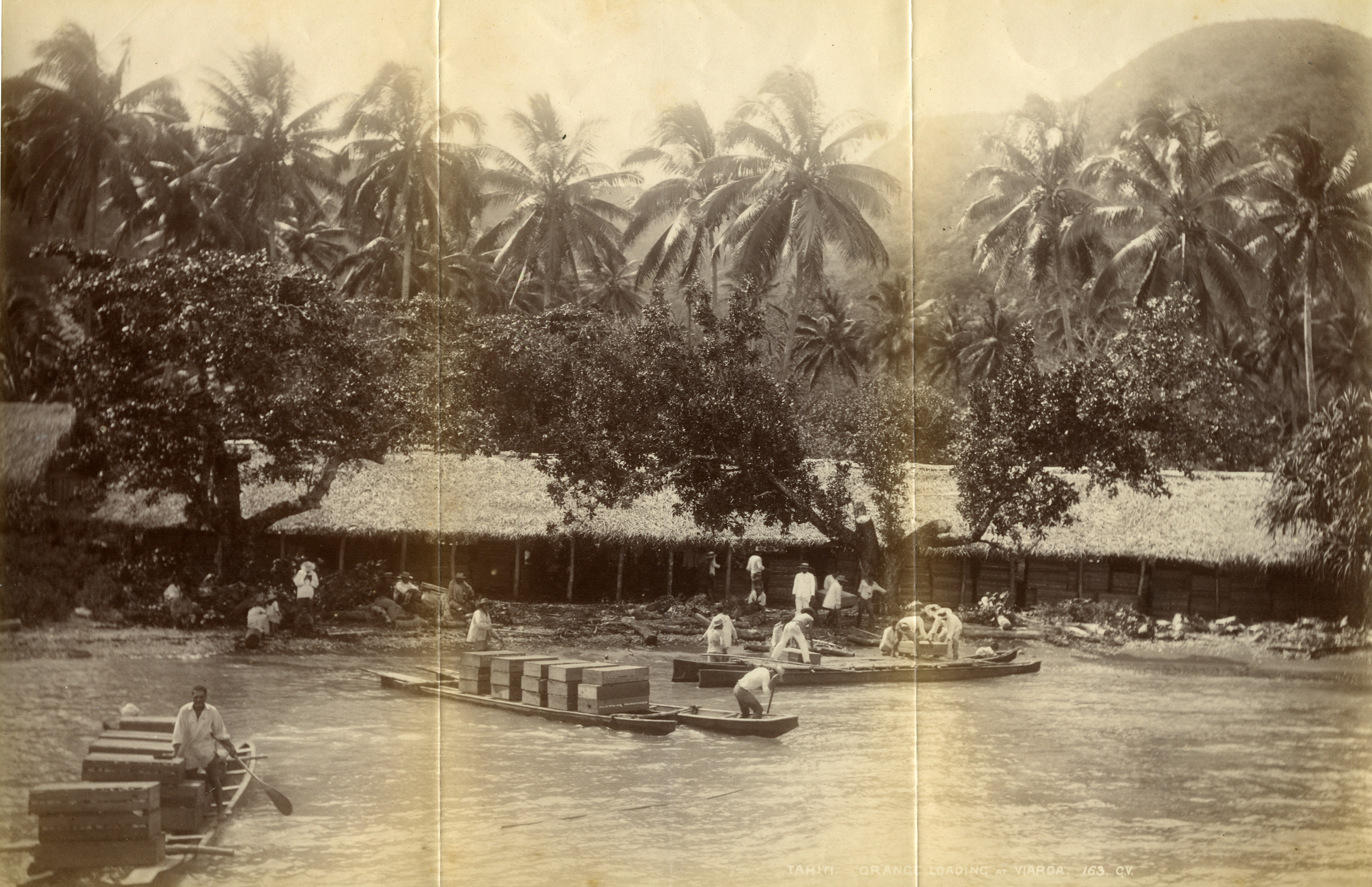
Orange loading at Viaroa, Tahiti, 1887

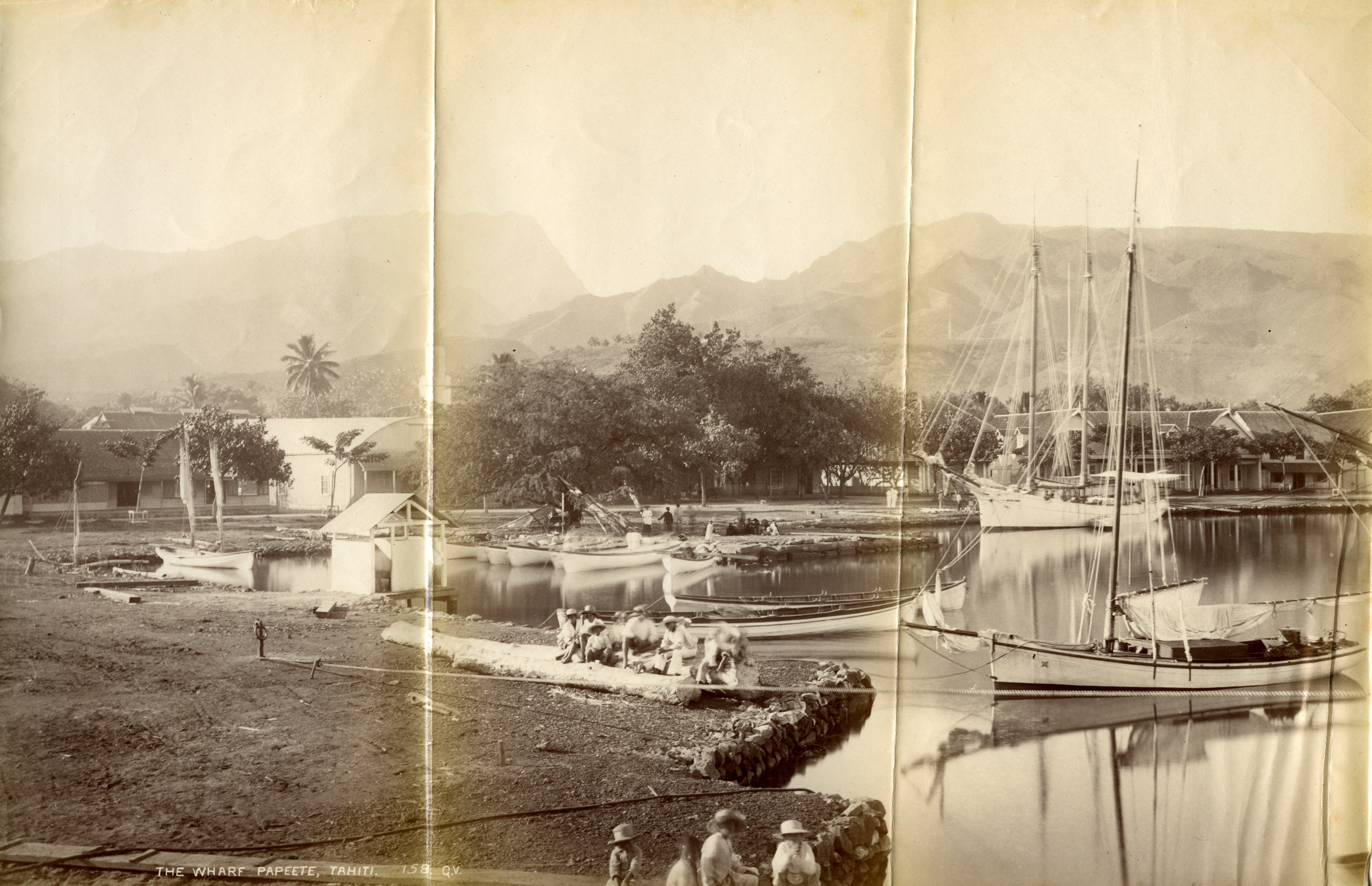
The Wharf, Papeete, Tahiti, 1887

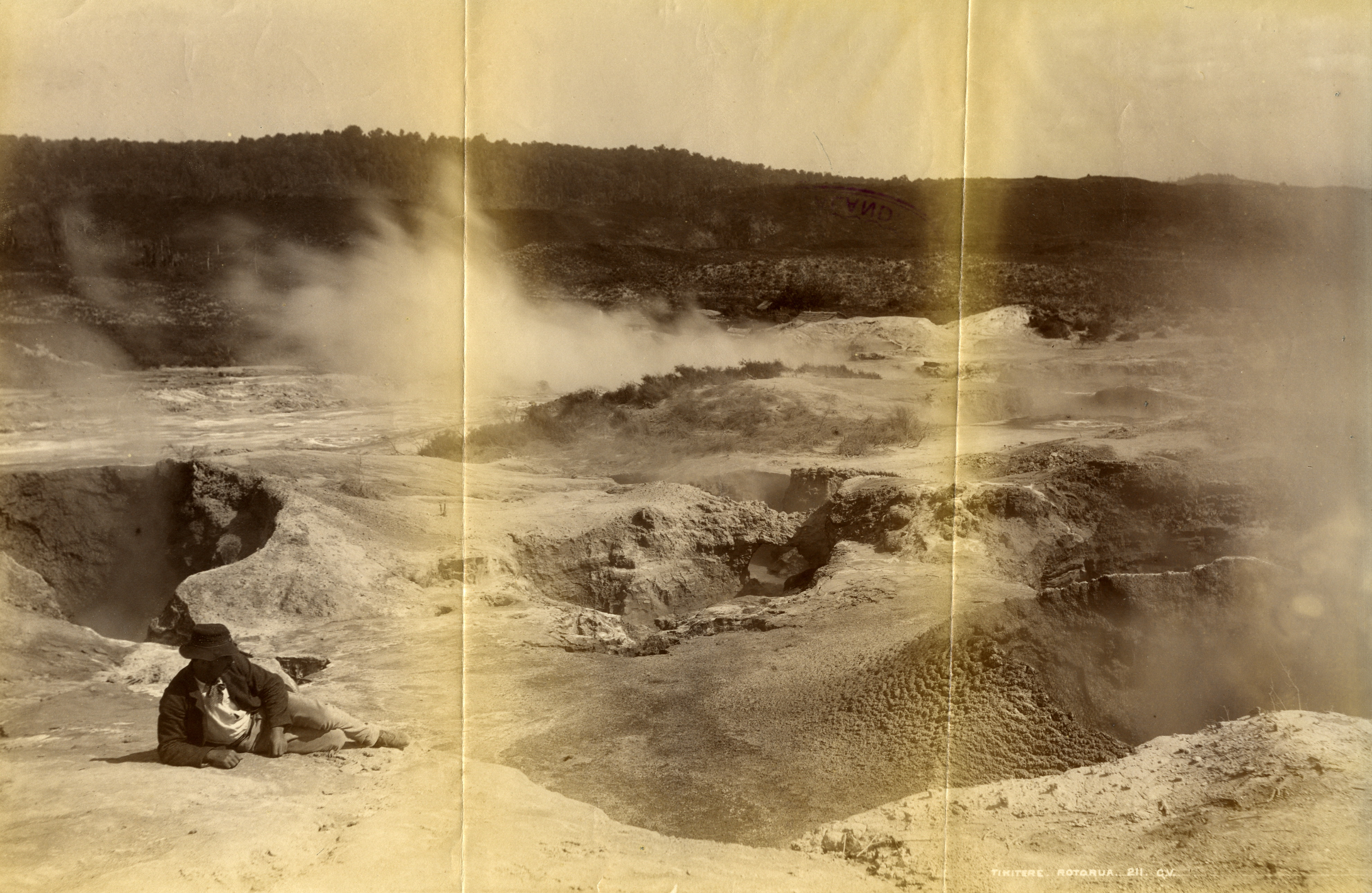
Tikitere, Rotorua, 1887

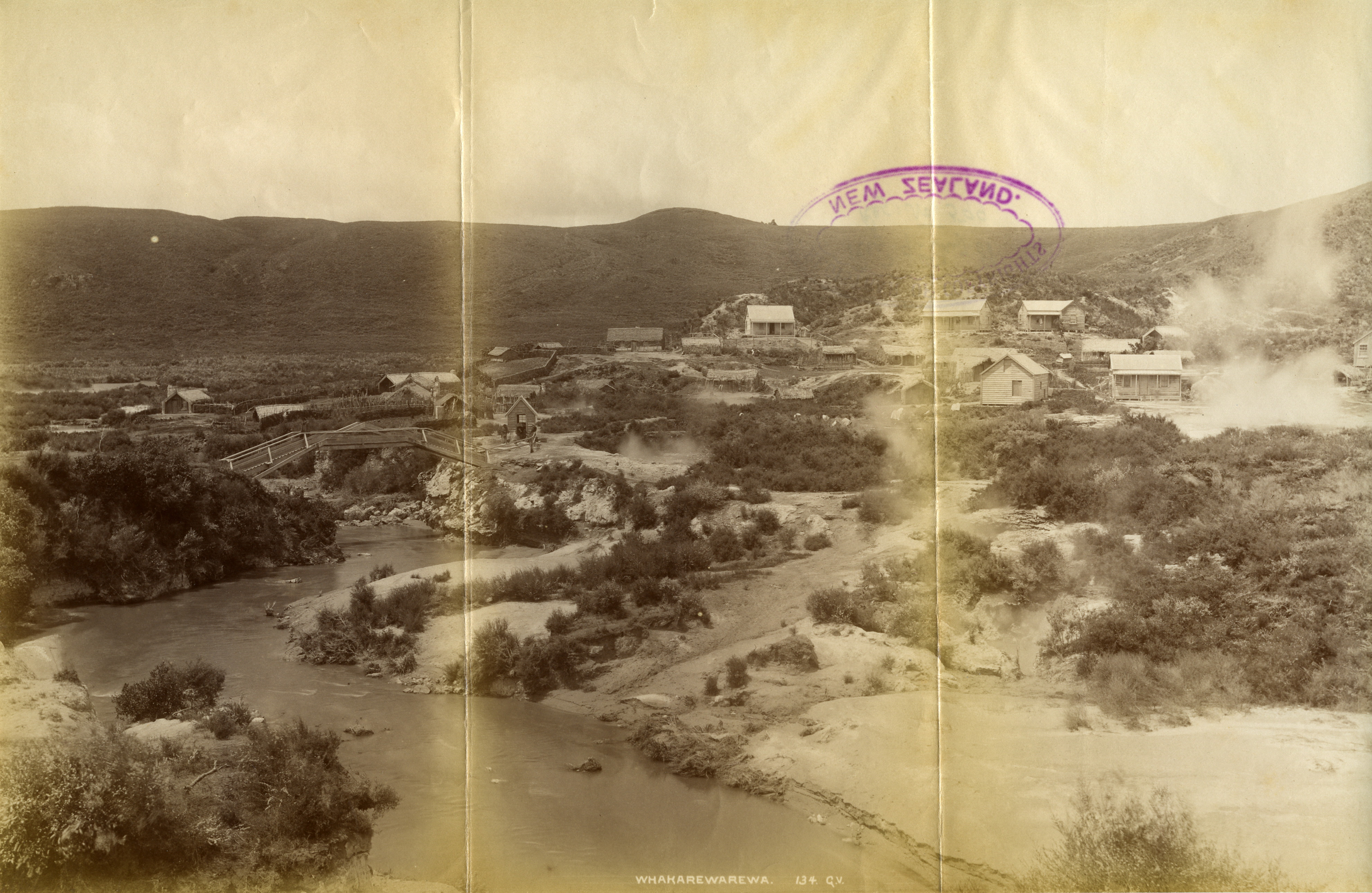
Whakarewarewa, Rotorua, 1887
