= John Adamson (physician) =

Scottish physician, photographer, physicist, lecturer and museum curator

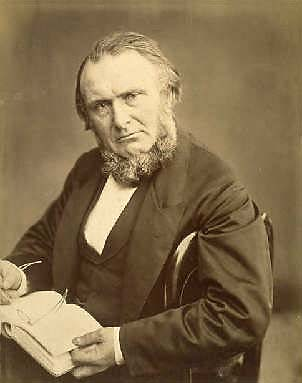
- Adamson circa 1865
- Born: 12 December 1809; St Andrews, Fife, Scotland
- Died: 11 August 1870 (aged 60); Dulnain Bridge, Moray, Scotland
- Occupations: Physician; Photographer; Physicist; Lecturer; Museum curator
- Known for: First calotype portrait in Scotland
- Spouse: Esther Christina Alexander (m. 1850)
- Relatives: Robert Adamson (brother)

John Adamson (12 December 1809 – 11 August 1870) was a Scottish physician, pioneer photographer, physicist, lecturer and museum curator. He was a highly respected figure in St Andrews, and was responsible for producing the first calotype portrait in Scotland in 1841. He taught the process to his brother, the famous pioneering photographer Robert Adamson. He was curator of the Literary and Philosophical Society Museum at St Andrews from 1838 until his death.

== Biography ==
Adamson was born in St Andrews, and grew up in Burnside, the eldest of 10 children born to Alexander Adamson, a Fife farmer and his wife, Rachael Melville.

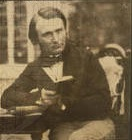
Adamson, circa 1845

Adamson was educated in the University of St Andrews and University of Edinburgh, qualifying with a licentiate diploma (LRCS) from the Royal College of Surgeons of Edinburgh in 1829. He moved to Paris, where he opened up a practice and was then employed as a ship's surgeon on a voyage to China. He returned to St Andrews in 1835, where he set up practice permanently. Adamson became heavily involved with Brewster at the university, studying the calotype and also became a lecturer and curator of the university museum. The older brother of pioneering photographer Robert Adamson, it was John who produced the first calotype portrait in Scotland at the Royal Museum in Edinburgh in May 1841 (various sources also say May 1840 or May 1842), with his close associate, physicist David Brewster of the University of St Andrews. Adamson "discovered how to control a process that remained remarkably difficult." John was also responsible for educating Robert in the process which he later used to produce some 2500 calotypes with David Octavius Hill between 1843 and 1848. Through Brewster, Adamson was in close contact with Henry Fox Talbot who invented the process. He obtained a Master's Degree in 1843. He was also a member and the curator of the St Andrews Literary and Philosophical Society museum from 1838 until his death.

Adamson died in Dulnain Bridge, Moray in 1870. He married Esther Christina Alexander in 1850. Their children included Esther Hamilton Proctor Adamson (1856–1929), John Adamson Jr., Robert Oswald Adamson and Alexander Archibald Adamson. His daughter Esther married Rev. William Weir Tulloch, the son of John Tulloch, principal of St Andrews University.

== Legacy ==
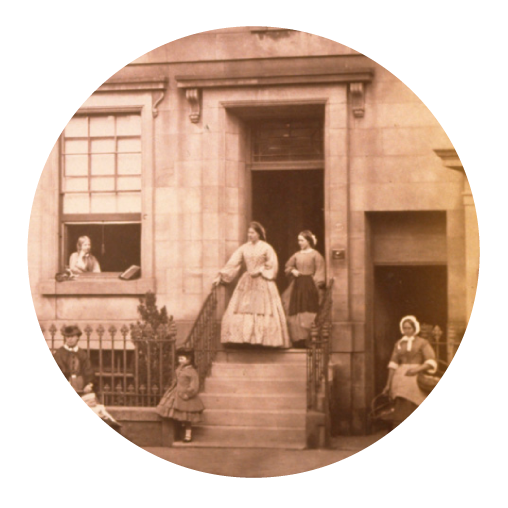
John Adamson's home and family in St Andrews, 1862

There is a blue plaque in his honour on his home at 127 South Street in St Andrews, where he lived from 1848 to 1865. It says "He was a physician and pioneer photographer. In 1841 he took the first caloptype portrait. He also taught his brother Robert and Thomas Rodger the technique and art of photography. A town councillor, he was a tireless worker for public health, and the hospital here is, in part, his memorial." His home became the main post office of St Andrews from 1907, but in 2012 it was converted into a restaurant, named The Adamson.
