= David Gray (police officer) =

David Gray, CBE, QPM (18 November 1914 – 28 December 1999) was HM Chief Inspector of Constabulary for Scotland from 1970 to 1979.

Gray was educated at Preston Grammar School. He joined the Renfrew and Bute Constabulary and progressed steadily upwards. He was Chief Constable of the Greenock Burgh Police from 1955 to 1958 where he was an early advocaste of Community Policing. He was the Honorary Secretary of the Scottish Chief Constables Association from 1958 to 1969; by Louise A. Jackson, Angela Bartie and Chief of the Stirling and Clackmannan force from 1958 to 1969.

== Notes ==
Police appointments
Preceded by Andrew Meldrum	HM Chief Inspector of Constabulary for Scotland; 1970–1979	Succeeded by Edward Frizzell
