= John Boyd (police officer) =

British police officer (1933–2024)

John MacInnes Boyd CBE QPM (14 October 1933 – 9 April 2024) was HM Chief Inspector of Constabulary for Scotland from 1993 to 1996.

== Life and career ==
Boyd was born in Oban on 14 October 1933. He was with the Paisley Burgh Police from 1956 to 1967, the Renfrew and Bute Constabulary from 1967 to 1975 and Strathclyde Police from 1975 to 1984. He was Chief Constable of Dumfries and Galloway Constabulary from 1984 to 1989, and President of ACPO from 1988 to 1989. He joined Her Majesty's Inspectorate of Constabulary in Scotland in 1989 and four years later became its head. Boyd died on 9 April 2024, at the age of 90.

== Notes ==
Police appointments
Preceded by Colin Sampson	HM Chief Inspector of Constabulary for Scotland; 1993–1996	Succeeded by William Sutherland
