= Andrew Laing (police officer) =

Andrew Laing (born 9 August 1963, in Edinburgh) was HM Chief Inspector of Constabulary for Scotland from 2010 to 2013.

He was educated at Portobello High School and Edinburgh Napier University. He was with the Lothian and Borders Police from 1982 to 2004; and the Fife Constabulary from 2004 to 2010, finishing with the rank of Deputy Chief Constable. After his time as Chief Inspector of Constabulary he was Director of the Scottish Business Resilience Centre from 2011 to 2015.

== Notes ==
Police appointments
Preceded by Paddy Tomkins	HM Chief Inspector of Constabulary for Scotland; 2010–2013	Succeeded by Derek Penman
