= Edward Frizzell =

Scottish law enforcement officer

Edward Frizzell, CBE, QPM, OStJ (6 December 1918 – 25 May 1987) was HM Chief Inspector of Constabulary for Scotland from 1979 to 1983.

After wartime service with the RAF he joined the Paisley Burgh Police rising to the rank of Detective Chief Inspector. Joining the Renfrew and Bute Constabulary as a Chief Superintendent in 1968 he rose to be its Assistant Chief Constable. In 1970 he was appointed Chief Constable of the Stirling and Clackmannan Force; and in 1975 of the newly formed Central Scotland Police Service.

== Honours ==

- Order of the British Empire
- Order of St John
- Queen's Police Medal

== Notes ==
Police appointments
| Preceded by Andrew Meldrum | HM Chief Inspector of Constabulary for Scotland; 1979–1983 | Succeeded by Alexander Morrison |
