= John Kinloch =

John Kinloch may refer to:

- John Kinloch (post master), 16th-century Scottish post master
- John Kinloch (police officer) (fl. 1857–1872), Scottish police officer
- John Kinloch (cricketer) (1833–1897), Australian cricketer
- Sir John Kinloch, 2nd Baronet (1849–1910), British politician
- John L. Kinloch (1880-1968), Scottish nationalist politician
