= Robert Dudgeon =

Robert Dudgeon may refer to:

- Robert Ellis Dudgeon (1820–1904), Scottish homeopath
- Robert Francis Dudgeon (1851–1932), Lord Lieutenant of Kirkcudbright
- Robert Maxwell Dudgeon (1881–1962), Scottish soldier and policeman
