= David Allan (police officer) =

British soldier and police officer

Lieutenant-Colonel David Allan OBE

HM Inspector of Constabulary for England and Wales
- In office 3 November 1931 – 31 August 1938

Assistant Commissioner of Police of the Metropolis "A"
- In office 8 June 1931 – 3 November 1931

HM Inspector of Constabulary for England and Wales
- In office 1 December 1930 – 8 June 1931

HM Inspector of Constabulary for Scotland
- In office 22 June 1927 – 1 December 1930

Chief Constable of Argyll
- In office 1920 – 22 June 1927

Personal details
- Born: William David Allan; 4 November 1879 Elgin, Moray, Scotland
- Died: 9 January 1961 (aged 81) Elgin, Moray, Scotland

Lieutenant-Colonel William David Allan OBE (4 November 1879 – 9 January 1961) was a British soldier and police officer.

Allan was born in Elgin, Moray, Scotland. He was educated at Elgin Academy and Blundell's School and commissioned a second lieutenant in the 3rd (Morayshire) Volunteer Battalion, Seaforth Highlanders on 4 January 1902. He transferred to the Regular Army, in the Black Watch, on 8 February 1902, and served with his regiment in the Second Boer War in South Africa. After the end of hostilities there in June 1902, he left Cape Town with other men of the regiment on the SS Orissa, which arrived at Southampton in late October 1902. He had been promoted lieutenant by 1910. On 20 June 1910, he became adjutant (and promoted temporary captain) of the 10th (Cyclist) Battalion, Royal Scots (Territorial Force). He was promoted major in 1917. On 1 January 1919, he was appointed Officer of the Order of the British Empire (OBE).

Allan served as chief constable of Bootle from 1919 to 1920, and chief constable of Argyll from 1920 until 22 June 1927. He was then appointed HM Inspector of Constabulary for Scotland. He was promoted lieutenant-colonel in the Reserve of Officers on 27 March 1929. On 1 December 1930 he was appointed one of the two HM Inspectors of Constabulary for England and Wales.

On 8 June 1931 he became assistant commissioner "A" of the London Metropolitan Police, in charge of uniformed policing. However, on 3 November 1931 he returned to the post of inspector of constabulary for England and Wales. He retired on 31 August 1938.

Allan married Eve Crozier; they had three sons. He died at his home in Elgin in 1961, aged 81.

== Footnotes ==
Police appointments
Unknown	Chief Constable of Bootle; 1919–1920	Unknown
Unknown	Chief Constable of Argyll; 1920–1927	Unknown
Preceded by Arthur Ferguson	HM Inspector of Constabulary for Scotland; 1927–1930	Succeeded by Robert Maxwell Dudgeon
Preceded by Sir Leonard Dunning	HM Inspector of Constabulary for England and Wales; 1930–1931	Unknown
Preceded by Sir Trevor Bigham	Assistant Commissioner "A", Metropolitan Police; 1931	Succeeded by James Whitehead
Unknown	HM Inspector of Constabulary for England and Wales; 1931–1938	Succeeded by Gordon Halland
