= David Munro =

David Munro may refer to:

- David Munro (documentary filmmaker) (1944–1999), English documentary film-maker
- David Munro (police commissioner) (born 1948), British police commissioner
- David H. Munro (born 1955), creator of the Yorick programming language
- David Munro (physician) (1878–1952), director of the Royal Air Force Medical Service, and rector of St Andrews University
- David Munro, American independent filmmaker of Full Grown Men
- David Munro (conservationist), former director general of the International Union for Conservation of Nature

== See also ==
- David Monro (disambiguation)
- David Munrow (1942–1976), English early music authority
