= Saroj Lal =

Indian-Scottish teacher and activist (1937–2020)

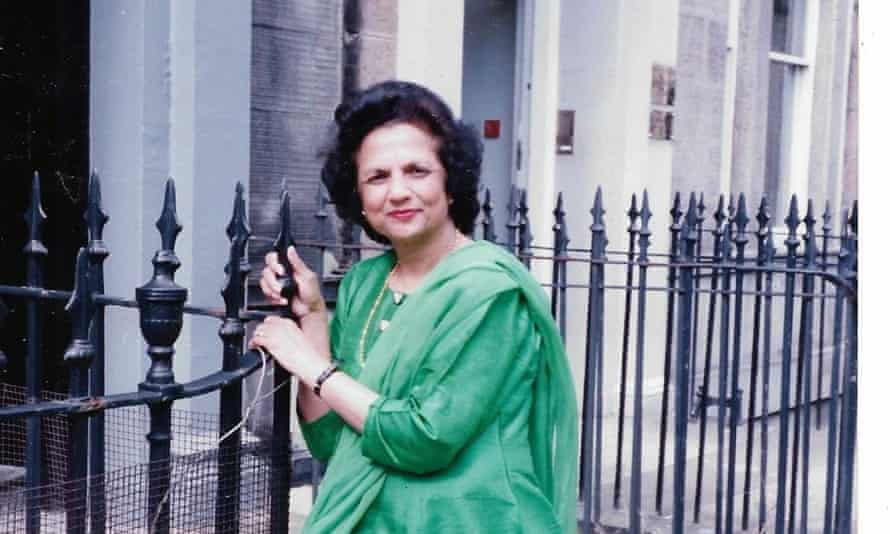
- Born: 23 April 1937; Gujranwala, British India
- Died: 12 March 2020 (aged 82)
- Citizenship: United Kingdom
- Education: Panjab University, Moray House College of Education
- Occupations: Teacher, activist

Saroj Lal (née Chanana; 23 April 1937 – 12 March 2020) was an Indian-Scottish teacher and activist, best known as a champion of race relations in Scotland for thirty years. She moved from India in the late 1960s and trained as a primary school teacher. She then volunteered with the YWCA, became a community worker and then became a director of Lothian Racial Equality Council (LREC) and first Asian woman to become a Justice of the Peace.

== Early life ==
Lal was born in Gujranwala (then in British India), daughter of Behari Lal Chanana, a businessman and Congress party politician, and his wife, Wazir Devi Khurana, who died when Saroj was a young girl. Her early years were marked by the events of partition. She attended Kanya Maha Vidyalaya school, Jalandhar, and in 1962 graduated with an MA in economics from Panjab University in Chandigarh. She taught briefly before her marriage to Amrit Lal, an engineer. The couple migrated to Edinburgh in the late 1960s, where Saroj combined raising a young family with furthering her education including studying at Moray House.

== Early career ==
Lal was the first Black Asian and Minority Ethnic teacher appointed in Edinburgh in 1970 to South Morningside Primary. On 20 August 2020, the school and Saroj's family celebrated her 50th anniversary of starting her employment there.

== Campaigning for race relations ==
Lal worked with Lothian and Borders police helping to draw up a working definition of racist attacks. This allowed regular monitoring of racist incidents, developed police training and increased the profile of black and minority ethnic communities within the police force and encouraged recruitment from minority communities. As a result of her trailblazing work on this area she became the first Asian woman in Scotland to be appointed as a Justice of the Peace.

== Legacy ==
- Revised and updated Religions and Cultures, a guide widely used by the NHS
- Founder of the Edinburgh Hindu Temple on St Andrew's Place, Leith
- Set up Edinburgh's first ever interpreting and translating service and dedicated ethnic library service at McDonald Road Library, Leith
- Board member of the Scottish Arts Council
- Created the Asian Cultural Girl's Club at Drummond Community High School
- Created the Continuation Course at Telford College.
- A campaign has been created to name a school "Saroj Lal Primary school" in Edinburgh.
