= Thomas Renfrew =

Scottish police officer (1901–1975)

Thomas Renfrew, CBE (18 June 1901 – 17 January 1975) was HM Chief Inspector of Constabulary for Scotland from 1957 to 1966.

Renfrew was educated at Eastbank Academy and the University of Glasgow. He joined the City of Glasgow Police in 1919; and transferred to Lanarkshire rising to be Chief Constable between 1945 and 1957.

== Notes ==
Police appointments
Preceded by Sidney Anderson Kinnear	HM Chief Inspector of Constabulary for Scotland; 1958–1966	Succeeded by Andrew Meldrum
