= Andrew Gibson Brown =

Scottish police officer

Andrew Gibson Brown, CBE, QPM (born 11 April 1945) was HM Chief Inspector of Constabulary for Scotland from 2004 to 2007.

He was educated at Kelso High School. He began his career as a Police Cadet in 1961; and by 1998 was Assistant Chief Constable (Crime) with the Lothian and Borders Police. He was Chief Constable of Grampian Police from 1998 to 2004.

== Notes ==
Police appointments
Preceded by Hugh Roy Graham Cameron	HM Chief Inspector of Constabulary for Scotland; 2004–2007	Succeeded by Paddy Tomkins
