= George Esson =

George Albert Esson CBE QPM (30 March 1942 – 13 July 2022) was Assistant Chief Constable of Grampian Police and Chief Constable of Dumfries and Galloway Constabulary (1989–1994). He was at the centre of major inquiries into the Piper Alpha disaster and the 1986 Chinook helicopter crash. He also headed the police investigation into the Lockerbie bombing.

He was a graduate of the University of Aberdeen.

After retiring from the police, he worked for Shell UK as a security and external affairs adviser and led its response to the Greenpeace protests at the decommissioning of the Brent Spar oil facility in the North Sea.

He was appointed CBE in the 1994 Birthday Honours.
