= Dumfries and Galloway Constabulary =

- Motto: Semper Vigilo

Agency overview
- Formed: 1948 (merger)
- Preceding agencies: Dumfriesshire Constabulary; Kirkcudbrightshire Constabulary; Wigtownshire Constabulary
- Dissolved: 2013
- Superseding agency: Police Scotland

Jurisdictional structure
- Operations jurisdiction: Dumfries and Galloway, Scotland
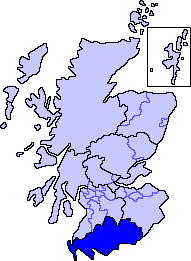
- Map of Dumfries and Galloway Constabulary's jurisdiction
- Area: 6,426 km^{2}
- Population: 148,000

Operational structure
- Headquarters: Cornwall Mount, Dumfries
- Sworn members: 508 + 106 Special Constables
- Agency executive: Patrick Shearer, Chief Constable
- Divisions: 2

Facilities
- Stations: 19

Dumfries and Galloway Constabulary was the territorial police force responsible for Dumfries and Galloway, Scotland until 1 April 2013, when an Act of the Scottish Parliament, the Police and Fire Reform (Scotland) Act 2012, created a single police force for Scotland – known as Police Scotland – on 1 April 2013. Before Police Scotland was created, it was Scotland's smallest police force by officer numbers.

The police force was formed in 1948 as an amalgamation of the police forces of Dumfriesshire, Kirkcudbrightshire, and Wigtownshire, and preceded the creation of the former Dumfries and Galloway Regional Council by 27 years.

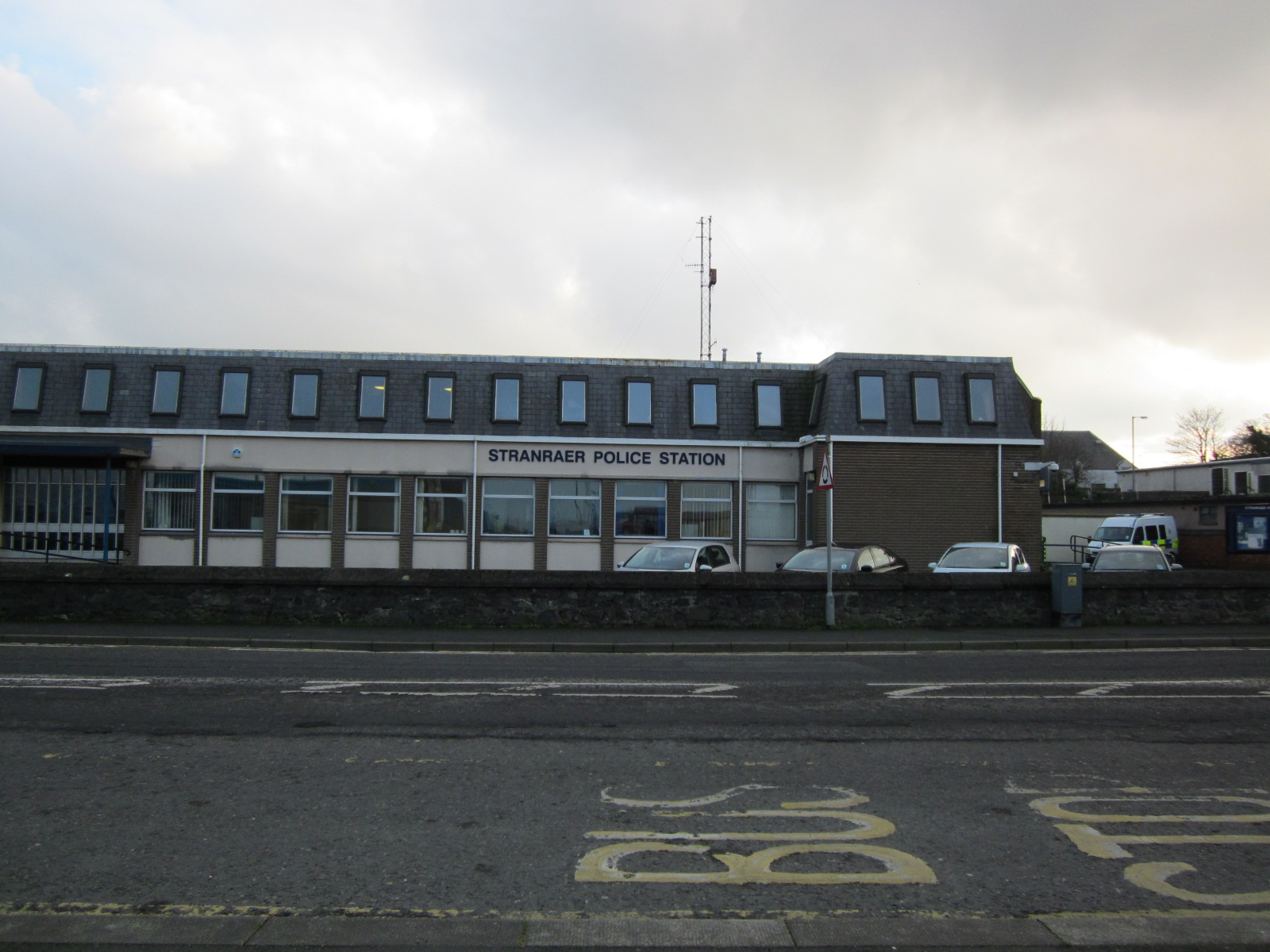
Stranraer Police Station, 2012

The last Chief Constable was Patrick Shearer, who was appointed on 24 April 2007, in succession to his predecessor David Strang after he was made Chief Constable of Lothian and Borders Police. The last Deputy Chief Constable was George Graham, who took over from Robert Ovens on 1 January 2006.

== Lockerbie bombing ==
On 21 December 1988, Pan Am Flight 103 exploded midair as a result of a bomb on board, and the wreckage crashed in the town of Lockerbie, within the police area of Dumfries and Galloway Constabulary. In the UK, the event is referred to as the "Lockerbie air disaster", the "Lockerbie bombing", or simply "Lockerbie". Eleven townspeople were killed in Sherwood Crescent, where the plane's wings and fuel tanks plummeted in a fiery explosion, leaving a huge crater. The 270 fatalities (259 on the plane, 11 in Lockerbie) included citizens of 21 nations.

The subsequent police investigation, led by Dumfries and Galloway Constabulary, was the largest ever mounted in Scottish history and became a murder inquiry when evidence of a bomb was found. Two men accused of being Libyan intelligence agents were eventually charged in 1991 with planting the bomb. A further nine years were needed to bring the accused to trial. Abdelbaset al-Megrahi was jailed for life in January 2001 following an 84-day trial, which was held at Camp Zeist in the Netherlands, but under Scottish law. On 20 August 2009, al-Megrahi was freed on humanitarian grounds because of an apparent terminal prostate cancer.

== Chief constables ==
- 1948–1965 – Sydney Arthur Berry
- 1965–1984 – Alexander Campbell
- 1984–1989 – John Boyd
- 1989–1994 – George Esson
- 1994–1996 – Roy Cameron (afterwards Chief Constable of Lothian and Borders, 1996–2002)
- 1996–2001 – William Rae
- 2001–2007 – David Strang
- 2007–2013 – Patrick Shearer
