= Andrew Cameron =

Andrew or Andy Cameron may refer to:

- Andrew Cameron (labor leader) (1834–1890), American founder of the National Labor Union
- Andrew Cameron (Presbyterian minister) (1855–1925), New Zealand Presbyterian minister, educationalist and community leader
- Andy Cameron (born 1940), Scottish comedian and broadcaster
- Bruce Cameron (bishop) (Andrew Bruce Cameron, born 1941), Scottish Anglican bishop
- Andrew Collier Cameron, British astronomer
- Andy Cameron (interactive artist) (1959–2012), British founder of art collective group Antirom
- Andrew Cameron (police officer), chief constable of Central Scotland Police

== See also ==
- Andrew Schulz (Andrew Cameron Schulz, born 1983), American stand-up comedian
