= Portobello High School =

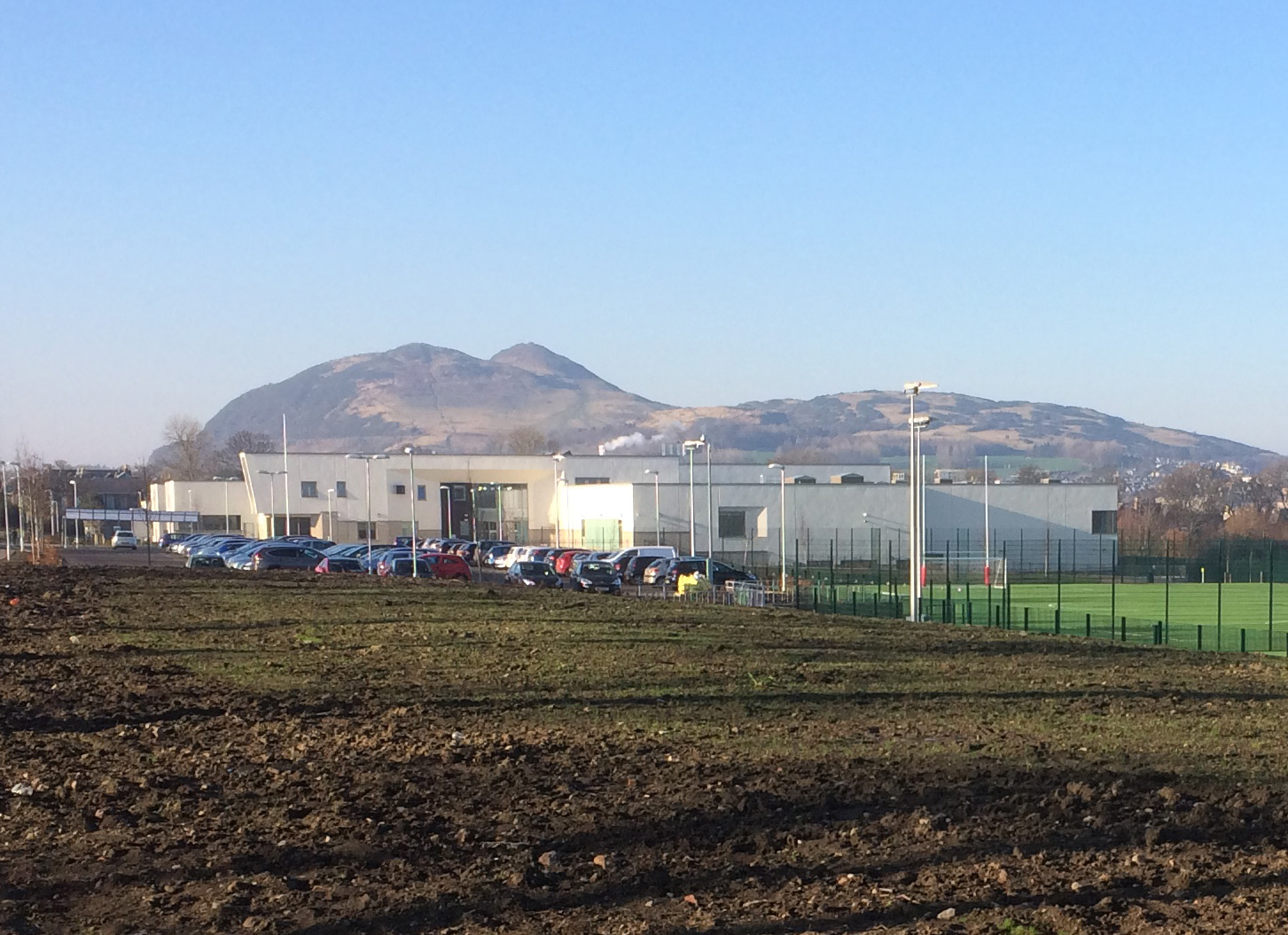
- The Portobello High School from 2016.

Location
- 1 Milton Road, Edinburgh, Scotland EH15 3BY; United Kingdom
- Coordinates: 55°56′40.71″N 3°6′47.47″W

Information
- Motto: Latin: Ope Et Consilio
- School district: City of Edinburgh
- Department for Education URN: 5533538 Tables
- Principal: Greg McDowall
- Enrolment: 1297
- Houses: Abercorn, Brunstane, Crichton and Duddingston
- Colours: Yellow, Blue, Red and Green
- Website: Official school website

Portobello High School is a large secondary school in Portobello in the east of Edinburgh. With over 1400 pupils it is one of the largest state schools in Edinburgh and Scotland. The current headteacher, as of 2024, is Greg McDowall. There are two other high schools near it Castlebrae Community High School and Holy Rood High School, Edinburgh

== Building ==
In early 2006, the City of Edinburgh Council engaged professional consultants to conduct a feasibility study on possible sites for the redevelopment of Portobello High School. This led to a statutory educational consultation, as well as a public consultation, on three possible options. The resulting report of the consultation was approved by the Council in December 2006. In December 2008, the City of Edinburgh Council committed £41M to the redevelopment of the school on the site identified by the 2006 consultation. The building was demolished by June 2017. The new school opened on Milton Road in October 2016, less than a mile away from the original site.

A design team was appointed in early 2009 with a planning application for the new school made in 2010. Planning permission was granted in early 2011 after an extensive pre-planning consultation programme. On 16 September 2011, Balfour Beatty were announced as the preferred choice to be awarded the contract to build the new school. Balfour Beatty delayed signing the contract until legal action was resolved relating to the place where the school was built.

There were two campaigns in relation to the building of the school; in favour of a new school, but recognising the difficulty of finding a satisfactory site, was Portobello for a New School (PFANS). In September 2012, the Portobello Park Action Group (PPAG) which was also keen for a new school but not on the site finally chosen, won its case to prevent building a new school on common land in Portobello.

The City of Edinburgh Council then promoted a Private Bill which was approved by the Scottish Parliament providing powers to use the Park for its functions as an education authority which allowed construction of the new school to begin in October 2014.

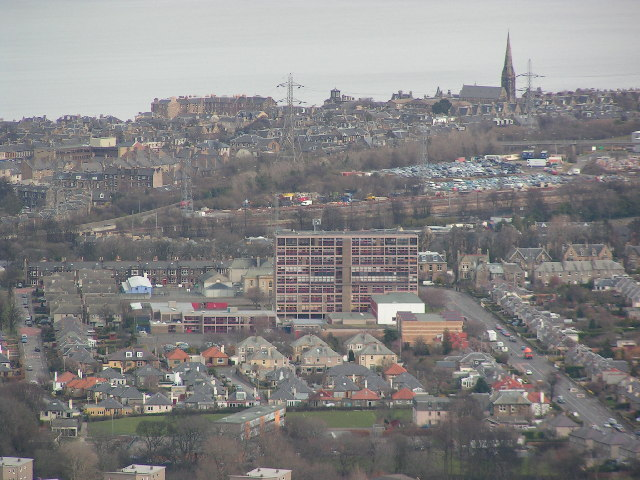
The old Portobello High School building on Duddingston Road, Edinburgh taken from Arthur's Seat.

The buildings in Duddingston Road were demolished between January and June 2017 in preparation for the construction of a new building for St John's Primary School. The new building was occupied from 20 August 2018, and the old St John's was demolished on 18 December 2018 ready for the site to be made into the Treverlen public park to replace the park land used to build the new Portobello High School on Milton Road.

== Notable alumni ==
- Kenny Anderson, boxer
- Ian Bell, journalist and writer
- Ewen Bremner, actor
- Ken Buchanan, boxer
- Andrew Crummy, artist
- Phil Cunningham, folk musician
- Josh Doig, footballer
- Andy Irving, footballer
- Adam King, footballer
- Billy King, footballer
- Andrew Laing, HM Chief Inspector of Constabulary for Scotland (2010–13)
- Shauna Macdonald, actress
- Jackie McNamara
- Marc McNulty, footballer
- Brian Monteith, politician
- Gail Porter, television presenter
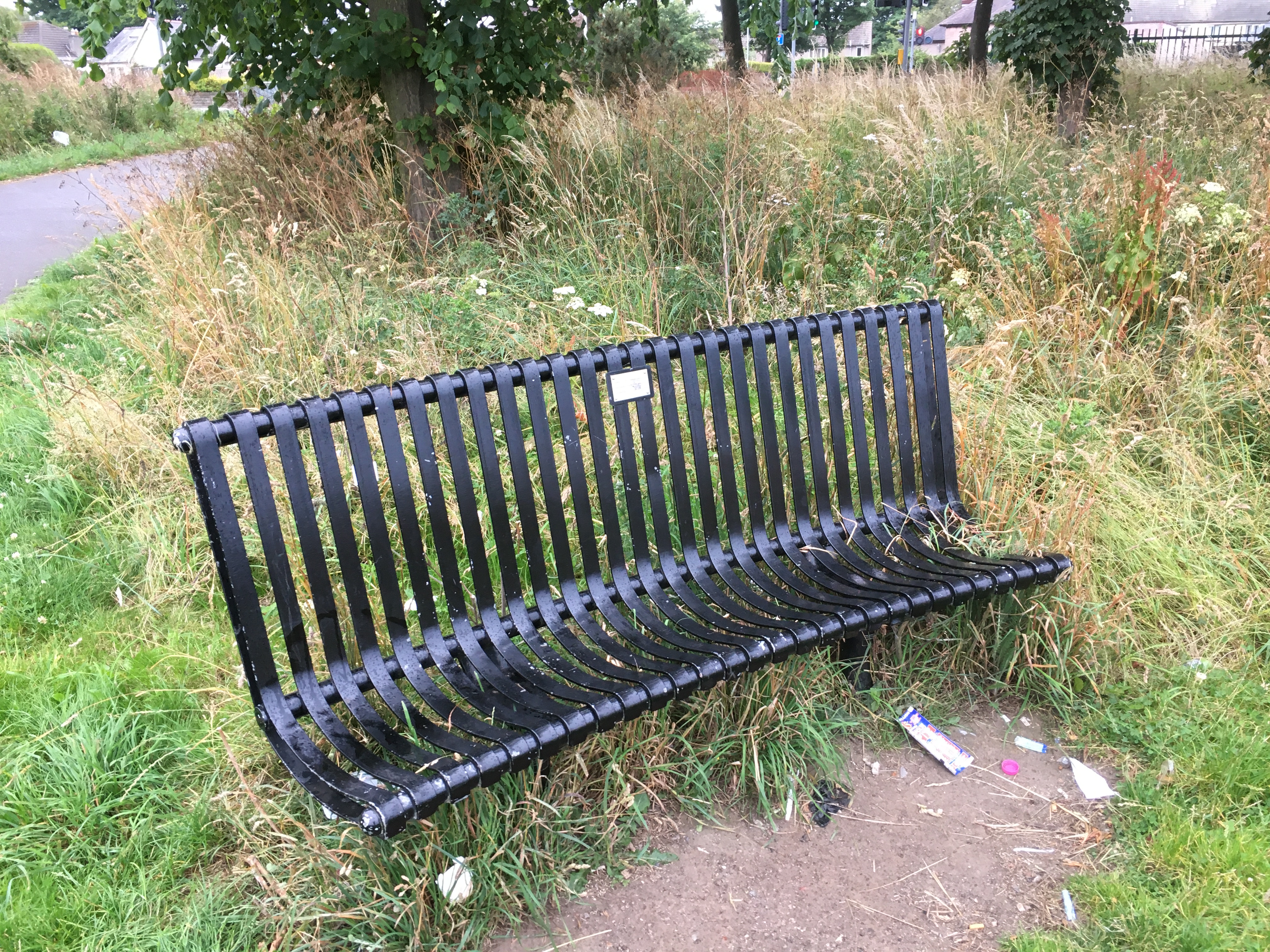
- The Bench provided by PPAG with grant from the City of Edinburgh Parks and Gardens Community Fund 2008
  John Robertson, footballer
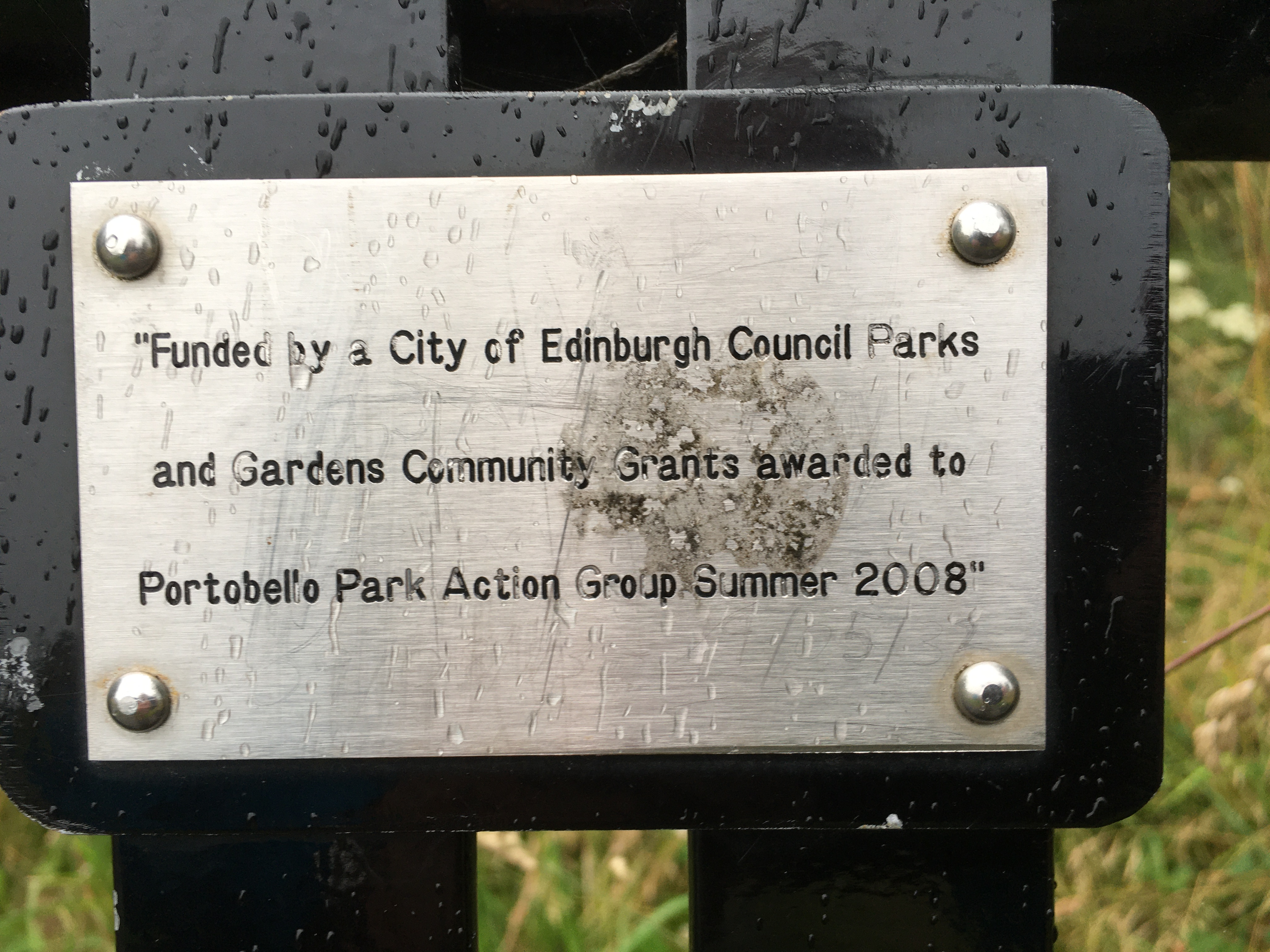
- Inscription on the Bench provided by PPAG with grant from CEC
  Gordon Smith, footballer
- Paul Thomson, musician
