= Willie Rae =

British chief constable

Sir William Rae, QPM, is the former Chief Constable of Strathclyde Police, the largest police force in Scotland. In recognition of his achievements Rae was awarded a knighthood by the Queen, in 2005.

== Career ==
He joined Dunbarton County Constabulary as a police cadet in 1966 and was appointed as a Constable in 1968. Dunbartonshire Constabulary merged with five other forces into what is now Strathclyde Police in 1975. Sir William was promoted to Sergeant in 1977 and rose swiftly through the ranks throughout the 1980s. In 1996, he became Chief Constable of Dumfries and Galloway Constabulary.

In 2001, he returned to Strathclyde Police as Chief Constable. He served as the Honorary Secretary of the Association of Chief Police Officers in Scotland. In the spring of 2007, Sir William announced that he will retire from the Force in September 2007. He played a significant part in the aftermath of the terrorist attack on Glasgow Airport in July 2007. As the public face of Scotland's police, he was widely quoted across the world. Sir Willie Rae retired in November 2007, replaced by Stephen House.

== Honours ==

Ribbon	Description	Notes
	Knight Bachelor	2005 Queen's Birthday Honours List
	Queen's Police Medal (QPM)	
	Queen Elizabeth II Golden Jubilee Medal	2002; UK Version of this Medal
	Police Long Service and Good Conduct Medal	

Police appointments
Preceded by Roy Cameron	Chief Constable of Dumfries and Galloway Constabulary; 1996–2001	Succeeded by David Strang
Preceded by Sir John Orr	Chief Constable of Strathclyde Police; 2001–2007	Succeeded by Stephen House
