= William Sutherland (police officer) =

British police officer (1933–2022)

Sir William Sutherland QPM

HM Chief Inspector of Constabulary for Scotland
- In office 1996–1998

Chief Constable of Lothian and Borders
- In office 1983–1996

Chief Constable of Bedfordshire
- In office 1979–1983

Personal details
- Born: William George MacKenzie Sutherland; 12 November 1933 Inverness, Scotland
- Died: 30 May 2022 (aged 88)

Sir William George MacKenzie Sutherland (12 November 1933 – 30 May 2022), often known as Bill Sutherland, was a British police officer.

Sutherland was born in Inverness and educated at Inverness Technical High School. He did his national service in the Royal Engineers, serving in Japan during the Korean War.

After military service, he joined Cheshire Constabulary in 1954. He moved to Surrey Constabulary in 1973, where he became chief superintendent in command of the Guildford division in 1974. There, he took charge of the response to the Guildford pub bombings of 5 October 1974. In 1975, he moved to Hertfordshire Constabulary as assistant chief constable, and in 1979 was appointed chief constable of Bedfordshire Constabulary. In 1983, he returned to Scotland as chief constable of Lothian and Borders Police, where he remained from thirteen years. He then served as HM Chief Inspector of Constabulary for Scotland from 1996 to 1998.

Sutherland was awarded the Queen's Police Medal (QPM) in the 1981 New Year Honours and knighted in the 1988 Birthday Honours.

While in Cheshire, he married policewoman Jennie Abbott, who came from Lancashire. They had two daughters, Alison and Anne.

== Honours ==

Ribbon	Description	Notes
	Knight Bachelor	1988
	Queen's Police Medal (QPM)	1981
	Police Long Service and Good Conduct Medal	

== Notes ==
Police appointments
Preceded by Anthony Armstrong	Chief Constable of Bedfordshire Constabulary; 1979–1983	Succeeded by Andrew Sloan
Preceded by Sir John Orr	Chief Constable of Lothian and Borders Police; 1983–1996	Succeeded by Roy Cameron
Preceded by John Boyd	HM Chief Inspector of Constabulary for Scotland; 1996–1998	Succeeded by William Taylor
