= David Monro =

David Monro may refer to:

- Sir David Monro (New Zealand politician) (1813–1877)
- David Monro (merchant) (c. 1765 – 1834), seigneur, businessman and political figure in Lower Canada
- David Monro (scholar) (1836–1905), Scottish Homeric scholar
- Sir David Monro (police officer) (1839–1909), Scottish police officer
