= William Taylor (police officer) =

British police officer (born 1947)

William Taylor CBE QPM

Personal details
- Born: 25 March 1947 (age 79) Scotland

William Taylor (born 25 March 1947) is a retired British police officer.

Taylor was educated at Blairgowrie High School, Perthshire, Scotland. In 1966 he joined the Metropolitan Police in London as a constable. He later joined the Criminal Investigation Department (CID) as a detective constable and served at police stations in Central London until 1976, when, as a detective chief inspector, he was transferred to the Community Relations Branch at Scotland Yard.

In 1978, he was promoted to detective superintendent and assigned to the Central Drugs Squad. In 1980 he was promoted to detective chief superintendent and became staff officer to Commissioner Sir David McNee.

In 1982, he was promoted to commander, the youngest officer of chief officer rank in the Metropolitan Police, and was appointed Commander CID (North East London). The following year he was appointed Commander Hackney and Stoke Newington (back in uniform), and in January 1985 he became Commander Flying Squad, in which role he also headed No. 9 Regional Crime Squad.

However, a few months later, in July 1985, Taylor was appointed Assistant Commissioner (deputy head) of the City of London Police and in 1989 Deputy Chief Constable of Thames Valley Police.

In 1990, he returned to the Metropolitan Police as Assistant Commissioner Specialist Operations (ACSO). In 1994 he was appointed Commissioner of Police of the City of London. In 1996 he was one of three contenders for the post of Chief Constable of the Royal Ulster Constabulary, but lost out to Ronnie Flanagan.

In 1998, he was appointed one of HM Inspectors of Constabulary and the following year was appointed HM Chief Inspector of Constabulary for Scotland, a post he held until his retirement in 2001. In 2003 he headed the Metropolitan Police inquiry into the collapse of the theft case against former royal butlers Paul Burrell and Harold Brown in 2002.

Taylor was awarded the Queen's Police Medal (QPM) in 1991 and was appointed Commander of the Order of the British Empire (CBE) in the 2001 Birthday Honours for services to the police.

== Honours ==

Ribbon	Description	Notes
	Order of the British Empire (CBE)	2001
	Queen's Police Medal (QPM)	1991
	Police Long Service and Good Conduct Medal	

== Footnotes ==
Police appointments
Unknown	Staff Officer to the Commissioner of Police of the Metropolis; 1980–1982	Succeeded by Paul Condon
Unknown	Commander CID (North East London), Metropolitan Police; 1982–1983	Unknown
Preceded by George Howlett	Commander Hackney and Stoke Newington, Metropolitan Police; 1983–1985	Unknown
Preceded by Frank Cater	Commander Flying Squad, Metropolitan Police; 1985–1985	Unknown
Preceded by Owen Kelly	Assistant Commissioner of Police of the City of London; 1985–1989	Unknown
Unknown	Deputy Chief Constable of Thames Valley Police; 1989–1990	Unknown
Preceded by John Smith	Assistant Commissioner Specialist Operations, Metropolitan Police; 1990–1994	Succeeded by David Veness
Preceded by Owen Kelly	Commissioner of Police of the City of London; 1994–1998	Succeeded by Perry Nove
Preceded by Sir William Sutherland	HM Chief Inspector of Constabulary for Scotland; 1999–2001	Succeeded by Sir Roy Cameron
