= Paddy Tomkins =

Metropolitan Police chief

Patrick Tomkins QPM was appointed HM Chief Inspector of Constabulary for Scotland by Royal Warrant in March 2007 and retired from the post in April 2009. He was formerly the Chief Constable of Lothian and Borders Police, which he joined in 2002 and was succeeded by David Strang. He initially joined Sussex Police in 1979 and in 1993 transferred to the Metropolitan Police Service as a Chief Superintendent. He served as divisional commander at Paddington Green before being promoted to Commander to attend the Royal College of Defence Studies in 1997, where he took the prize for the best research paper that year . He served as Commander (Crime) for the then 1 Area (Central), where he led a multi-force search for the serial rapist Richard Baker, and was the day shift Gold commander for the policing of the occupation of the Greek Embassy in London in 1999. In 1999 he was seconded to HM Inspectorate of Constabulary (England and Wales) as a Deputy Assistant Commissioner.

He was educated at Hastings Grammar School and King's College London where he took First Class Honours in History. In 2012 he attained the degree of Master of Arts in Classical Studies from the Open University.

He attended the UK Cabinet Office Top Management Programme (TMP 58) in 2000.

He was awarded the Queen's Police Medal, for distinguished police service, in the 2006 Birthday Honours.

He is a company director and lives in West Sussex. He is widowed and has two adult children.

Police appointments
Preceded by Andrew Gibson Brown	HM Chief Inspector of Constabulary for Scotland; 2007–2009	Succeeded by Andrew Laing
