= Roy Cameron (police officer) =

Sir Hugh Roy Graham Cameron, QPM (born 14 April 1947) was HM Chief Inspector of Constabulary for Scotland from 2002 to 2004.

He was educated at Bearsden Academy and the University of Strathclyde. He joined the Dunbartonshire Constabulary in 1964 and rose from Cadet to Chief Superintendent. In 1990 he left to become Assistant Chief Constable of Strathclyde Police.

From 1994 to 1996, he was Chief Constable of Dumfries and Galloway Constabulary; and then of the Lothian and Borders Force until 2002. He was Deputy Lieutenant of East Lothian from 2004 to 2008.

== Notes ==
Police appointments
Preceded by William Taylor	HM Chief Inspector of Constabulary for Scotland; 2002–2004	Succeeded by Andrew Gibson Brown
