= Alexander Morrison (police officer) =

Scottish police officer

Alexander Morrison, CVO, QPM, (28 August 1927 – 8 July 2018) was a senior Scottish police officer in the last decades of the 20th century.

A native of Lewis, he was Chief Constable of Aberdeen City Police from 1970 to 1975, Grampian Police from 1975 to 1983 then HM Chief Inspector of Constabulary for Scotland from 1983 to 1988.

== Notes ==
Police appointments
Preceded by Edward Frizzell	HM Chief Inspector of Constabulary for Scotland; 1983–1988	Succeeded by Colin Sampson
