= Andrew Meldrum (police officer) =

Andrew Meldrum, CBE, KPM (22 April 1909 – 10 January 1995) was HM Chief Inspector of Constabulary for Scotland from 1966 to 1969.

Meldrum was educated at Burntisland Higher Grade School and joined the Stirlingshire Constabulary in 1927. He was appointed Deputy Chief Constable of Inverness Burgh Police in 1943 and Chief Constable in 1946. He was Chief Constable of the Angus Constabulary from 1949 to 1955; and then of Fife from 1955 to 1966.

== Notes ==
Police appointments
Preceded by Thomas Renfrew	HM Chief Inspector of Constabulary for Scotland; 1966–1969	Succeeded by David Gray
