= Colin Sampson (police officer) =

British police officer (1929–2018)

Sir Colin Sampson, CBE, QPM, KStJ (26 May 1929 – 15 October 2018) was a British police officer who held several senior police posts in the last decades of the 20th century.

Sampson was educated at Wakefield Technical College and the University of Leeds. He joined the Dewsbury Borough Police Force in 1949. He spent many years in CID and was the head of the Home Office Detective Training School at Wakefield from 1971 to 1972. He became Assistant Chief Constable of West Yorkshire Constabulary in 1974; Deputy Chief Constable of Nottinghamshire Police in 1976; and Chief Constable of West Yorkshire Police in 1983. He was one of Her Majesty's Inspectorsof Constabulary from 1989 to 1990; and HM Chief Inspector of Constabulary for Scotland from 1991 to 1993.

Sampson died on 15 October 2018, at the age of 89.

== Notes ==
Police appointments
Preceded by Alexander Morrison	HM Chief Inspector of Constabulary for Scotland; 1991–1993	Succeeded by John MacInnes Boyd
