= Derek Penman =

Derek Penman QPM
- Police career
- Country: Scotland
- Allegiance: United Kingdom
- Service years: 4
- Rank: His Majesty's Chief Inspector of Constabulary for Scotland
- Awards: Queen's Police Medal
- Other work: Chair of the International Advisory Committee of the Scottish Institute for Policing Research

Derek Penman, QPM, was HM Chief Inspector of Constabulary for Scotland between January 2014 and March 2018. In his position, he was succeeded by Gill Imery, the first female in this roll.

Penman joined Central Scotland Police as a cadet in 1982 rising to the rank of Chief Superintendent by 2007. In 2008 he became Assistant Chief Constable (Crime and Specialist Operations) of Grampian Police. In 2011 he returned to Central as Deputy Chief Constable and was for a while Temporary Chief Constable before becoming Assistant Chief Constable (local policing, north) for the new Police Scotland. In 2015 he voiced his opinion as an advocate for stricter rules on stop-and-search procedures. In 2017, he investigated a Scottish Police Authority officer's departure from her position, who claimed that she was being silenced.

He was awarded the Queen's Police Medal (QPM) in the 2014 Birthday Honours. In July 2021, after his retirement in 2018, he was appointed by the Irish Policing Authority to investigate computer-aided dispatch incidents that were incorrectly closed from 2019-20, providing dozens of findings and recommendations. At this time, he was Chair of the International Advisory Committee of the Scottish Institute for Policing Research, as well as a professor at the University of Dundee.

Police appointments
Preceded by George Graham	HM Chief Inspector of Constabulary for Scotland; 2014–2018	Succeeded by Gill Imery
