= Wendy Sinclair-Gieben =

Wendy Sinclair-Gieben is a British public servant and former teacher who has served as His Majesty's Chief Inspector of Prisons for Scotland since July 2018. She is the eighth person and first woman to hold the post.

== Career ==
Sinclair-Gieben was educated in Scotland and holds a Bachelor of Education and a master's degree in Criminology and Management from the University of Cambridge. Following an initial career in teaching, working with children with special needs in the Northern Territories of Canada, she transferred to public sector in 1998, working in criminal justice, immigration detention and healthcare management. She was a prison governor for HM Prison Service in England & Wales from 1998 to 2006. She then moved into the private sector, serving as a prison director (Note: The equivalent of the governor in a private prison) with Serco, first at HMP Kilmarnock and, from 2009, in Australia, including at the Wandoo Reintegration Facility for young men in Perth, WA. Her appointment as HM Chief Inspector of Prisons in succession to David Strang was announced by the Scottish Government in May 2018 and she took office the following July.

In recognition for her work in rehabilitation and reintegration, she has received the Lord Justice Woolf award for Resettlement and the Infrastructure Partnerships Australia award for Operator and Service Provider Excellence.

== Other work ==
Sinclair-Gieben has worked as a non-executive director of the charity NOFASD, which raises awareness and provides support to families living with Foetal Alcohol Spectrum Disorder (FASD) in Australia.

Government offices
Preceded by David Strang	His Majesty's Chief Inspector of Prisons for Scotland since 2018	Succeeded by Incumbent
