= McLellan Commission =

The McLellan Commission, chaired by Andrew McLellan, with a remit to review safeguarding policy, procedure and practice within the Catholic Church in Scotland, and to make recommendations for improvement, was announced by the Bishops' Conference of Scotland in November 2013. It published its report, "A Review of the Current Safeguarding Policies, Procedures and Practice within the Catholic Church in Scotland", known as the McLellan Report, on 18 August 2015. The commission investigated child sex abuse by Scotland's priests and religious, and the Church's responses. Section 2.1 of the Report acknowledged that "There is no doubt that abuse of the most serious kind has taken place within the Catholic Church in Scotland".

Andrew McLellan insisted repeatedly since he was commissioned to write the report that its remit did not include naming any guilty individuals, or analysing the church's denial of wrongdoing. The Report simply repeated known facts: historical sex abuse within the Church, a culture of denial, and lack of support for victims. The Report does make recommendations on future safeguarding.

The Report was criticised as "a whitewash ... So soft and fluffy ... that it should have been delivered with a big pink ribbon tied around it and pictures of Walt Disney characters on its cover".

== The Report ==
The Report started with a Foreword, Preface, and Overview. Part 1 covered Background and Context, including the remit and methodology. Part 2 described its Findings, with Chapter 2 to establish the truth of what happened in the past, covering harm and good practice. Later chapters gave recommendations, steps to prevent recurrence and ensure that the principles of justice are fully respected, discussed whistleblowing, and "bring[ing] healing to the victims and to all those affected by these egregious crimes". Chapter 6 covered implementation.
