= John Orr (police officer, born 1945) =

Scottish police officer

Sir John Orr OBE QPM (3 September 1945 – 19 February 2018) was a senior police officer and the chief constable of Strathclyde Police between 1996 and 2001.

== Early life and education ==
Orr was born in Kilmarnock in Ayrshire. He graduated from Open University, and also received a Diploma in Forensic Medicine from the University of Glasgow.

== Police career ==
John Orr first joined the police as a cadet in 1961 at Renfrew and Bute Constabulary. As Detective Chief Superintendent of Strathclyde Police, he was appointed Senior Investigating Officer of the Lockerbie disaster which occurred on 21 December 1988. This was the biggest single murder investigation in the history of Scottish policing.

In 2001, Orr was knighted by the Queen for his services to Scottish policing.

== After retirement ==
In 2001 he was appointed chairman of Kilmarnock Football Club. He remained as chairman until his resignation in 2003, when he was appointed as Honorary President.

In 2005 Sir John reported on his "Review of Marches and Parades in Scotland" which was to be formalised through the Scottish Parliament to provide a framework for legal protocols of marches and parades within Scotland.

John Orr died on 19 February 2018.

== Portrayal in popular culture ==
Orr appears as a central character in the British television drama series The Bombing of Pan Am 103. He is played by Peter Mullan.

Police appointments
Preceded by Leslie Sharp	Chief Constable of Strathclyde Police; 1996–2001	Succeeded by Willie Rae
