= Scottish North Eastern Counties Constabulary =

Scottish North Eastern Counties Constabularies
- Abbreviation: SNECC
- Formation: 16 May 1949 (merger)
- Dissolved: 16 May 1975
- Type: Police Force
- Region served: North East Scotland
- Remarks: Merged in 1975 with Aberdeen City Police to form Grampian Police

The Scottish North Eastern Counties Constabulary, was one of the two Police Forces which in 1975, were merged to create Grampian Police.

== History ==
The Scottish North Eastern Counties Constabulary was formed on 16 May 1949 when the existing forces of Aberdeenshire Constabulary, Banffshire Constabulary, Kincardineshire Constabulary and Moray & Nairn Constabulary amalgamated.

However, earlier amalgamations of the smaller Burgh forces had already taken place as follows. Aberdeenshire Constabulary was formed in 1840 and in 1866 amalgamated with the Fraserburgh Burgh force which had been formed in 1859.

In 1886, Banffshire Constabulary (formed in 1840) amalgamated with the Banff Burgh force (formed in 1859) and in 1870 it also amalgamated with Macduff Burgh (also formed in 1859).

Elginshire Constabulary (formed in 1840) amalgamated in 1886/87 with the Forres Burgh and Nairn Burgh forces (both formed in 1859). It was renamed Morayshire Constabulary in 1890 and in 1893 it amalgamated with the Elgin Burgh force (formed in 1850).

Moray & Nairn Constabulary was formed in 1930 with the amalgamation of Elginshire Constabulary and Nairnshire Constabulary (formed in 1850).

== Merger ==
On 16 May 1975, SNECC was merged with Aberdeen City Police to form Grampian Police, with the exception of the Nairn area which was transferred to Northern Constabulary. Grampian Police and Northern Constabulary were themselves merged, along with the other Scottish territorial police forces, into Police Scotland in 2013.
