= David Monro (police officer) =

Scottish police officer

Capt. Sir David Monro of Allan JP DL (13 May 1839 – 9 January 1909) was a Scottish police officer, who was Chief Inspector of Constabulary for Scotland from 1884 until 1904.

He was born in Allan, Fearn, Highland, into a branch of the Munros of Foulis. He served in the Indian Army in Madras from 1857 to 1874, when he became Chief Constable of the Isle of Man. In 1878, he was appointed Chief Constable of Soliuburgh and Linlithgow. He retired in 1904, when he was knighted. He had three sons and three daughters.

Police appointments
Preceded by Charles Carnegie	HM Chief Inspector of Constabulary for Scotland; 1884–1904	Succeeded by Arthur George Ferguson
