= Fettesgate =

Scandal involving the Lothian and Borders police force

Fettesgate was the term given to a major scandal involving the Lothian and Borders Police force in the 1990s, from its Fettes Avenue headquarters near Fettes College in Edinburgh.

The "Fettesgate scandal", as the incident was quickly called, began in the early hours of 19 July 1992, when burglars spent three hours in the Fettes headquarters of the police force. The break-in, through an unsecured window of the Scottish Crime Squad’s ground-floor offices in the HQ building, led to several confidential documents being stolen and Animal Liberation Front slogans being sprayed on the walls.

Two journalists who reported on the incident after receiving tip-offs were arrested:

- Alan Muir, a reporter for The Sun, wrote a story based on an anonymous telephone call on the day of the incident, and was detained for six hours, and
- Ron McKay, a journalist for Scotland on Sunday found documents after another anonymous call six days later. When he wrote a story based on the documents, he was arrested at dawn, while at his girlfriend's house in Chatham, Kent. He was held overnight, and charged with reset, the crime under Scots law of receiving stolen property. The charges were dropped six months later.

The stolen documents concerned the police's use of "telephone metering"; recording the destination and duration of suspects' telephone calls, without listening in on them. Although this was regarded as legal, the controversy led to a debate about privacy and what safeguards were needed regarding information gathered in this way.

The theft of such sensitive material from what should have been such a secure place—a police headquarters—led to questions about the competence of the Lothian and Borders force to take charge of the European summit in Edinburgh later that year.

It transpired that the Animal Liberation Front had not been involved in the break-in. The chief constable later admitted that the treatment of Mr McKay was tactless and apologised to the editor of Scotland on Sunday. Nobody has been charged with the break-in.

The return of the sensitive files was allegedly the result of senior detectives reaching an immunity deal with a man close to the city’s gay criminal underworld. An internal report is believed to have been completed by the police force on the matter, but has never been released to the public.
