= Grampian Police Pipe Band =

Scottish pipe band

Grampian Police Scotland Pipe Band
- Established: 1907
- Grade: 2
- Pipe major: Julie Brinklow
- Drum sergeant: Lucy Maclean
- Tartan: Grampian Police
- Website: www.grampianpolicepipeband.com

Grampian Police Scotland Pipe Band is a Grade 2 pipe band from the North East of Scotland and is associated with Grampian Police. The band is open to both civilians and members of the police force.

== History ==
The band was formed as Aberdeen City Police Pipe Band in 1907, wearing the Hunting Gordon tartan. In 1965 a new uniform was introduced with the Black Stewart tartan.

The merger of police forces in the north of Scotland to create Grampian police resulted in the present name of the band being adopted.

The band was promoted to Grade 1 for the start of the 1995 season, until it moved back to Grade 2 in 2005. For the 2012 season, the band returned to Grade 1, having changed both its pipe major and drum sergeant. It placed 16th overall in the 2012 World Pipe Band Championships.

After a 6 year hiatus, in October 2024, the band reformed under the leadership of Pipe Major Julie Brinklow and Leading Drummer Lucy Maclean.

== Events ==
The band plays at highland games and RSPBA competitions as well as police and community events. In 1990, the band played for the Queen Mother to celebrate her 90th birthday.

== Discography ==
- The Bluebells of Scotland, Flower of Scotland (1995)
- The Pipes & Drums of Scotland (2005)
- Police Pipe Bands of Scotland (2010)
- Best of Scottish Pipes and Drums (2010)
- Marches Ecossaises (2011)
