= Sidney Anderson Kinnear =

Sidney Anderson Kinnear, CBE (1902 – 1985) was the first HM Chief Inspector of Constabulary for Scotland to come from a police rather than a military background.

== Notes ==
Police appointments
Preceded by Robert Maxwell Dudgeon	HM Chief Inspector of Constabulary for Scotland; 1945–1957	Succeeded by Thomas Renfrew
