= HM Inspectorate of Prisons for Scotland =

His Majesty's Inspectorate of Prisons for Scotland

Agency overview
- Formed: 29 October 1980
- Type: Scottish public body
- Jurisdiction: Scotland
- Headquarters: Edinburgh; 55.930°N 3.276°W
- Employees: 14
- Minister responsible: Angela Constance MSP, Cabinet Secretary for Justice and Home Affairs
- Agency executive: Sarah Snell, HM Chief Inspector of Prisons
- Parent agency: Scottish Government
- Website: www.prisonsinspectoratescotland.gov.uk

Map
- Scotland in the UK and Europe

His Majesty's Inspectorate of Prisons for Scotland (commonly HM Inspectorate of Prisons for Scotland) was established in 1981, following recommendations of the May Committee report of 1979. The Inspectorate is directly funded by the Scottish Government.

As of January 2026, His Majesty's Chief Inspector of Prisons for Scotland is Sarah Snell.

== Origins ==
His Majesty's Chief Inspector of Prisons for Scotland was created following a Committee of Inquiry into the prison system in the United Kingdom, whose report was published in 1979. One of the recommendations of its report was the creation of a new type of Prisons' Inspectorate, independent of the Prison Service. Previously inspections had been carried out by a Prison Governor. With the Scottish Prison Service being separate from its counterpart in England and Wales two inspectorates were created, with the other being HM Inspectorate of Prisons for England & Wales.

== Remit and jurisdiction ==
His Majesty's Chief Inspector of Prisons for Scotland was placed on a statutory basis by an Act of Parliament, the Prisons (Scotland) Act 1989; its functions and responsibilities are laid down accordingly. The Chief Inspector submits an annual report to the Scottish Parliament. Reports on individual prison visits are made to the Scottish Government and are subsequently published. The Scottish Ministers may also refer specific prison-related matters to the Chief Inspector for him to report on.

The Inspectorate carries out a regular inspection of Scotland's prisons (including the privately run prisons). Each of Scotland's 16 prisons is normally subject to a full inspection every three years. Annual shorter, follow-up visits - which may be unannounced - are also made. Issues examined include actual physical conditions, the quality of prisoner regimes, the morale of staff and prisoners, facilities and amenities available to staff and prisoners, safety issues, and decency and contribution to reducing re-offending. The Inspectorate also inspects Legalised Police Cells (mainly used in rural parts of northern Scotland) and the conditions of prisoner escort arrangements.

The Inspectorate can only make recommendations; it has no executive power to enforce these recommendations. The inspection system is identical for both state-run and privately managed prisons.

== Personnel ==
The post of HM Chief Inspector of Prisons for Scotland is full-time. It has always been a lay appointment (an individual with no previous connection with the prison service). The Chief Inspector is appointed by the Crown under section 7 of the Prisons (Scotland) Act 1989. The Inspectorate's office is located in Edinburgh.

Although the Chief Inspector is entirely independent of the Scottish Prison Service, he is assisted by two senior managers seconded from the Service. They offer professional advice and guidance during the conduct of inspections. The Inspectorate team also includes a Scottish Government civil servant and a Personal Secretary. The Inspectorate works with other statutory Inspectorates responsible for issues such as health, education and additions.

=== Previous HM Chief Inspectors ===
- Philip Barry, 1981–1985
- Thomas Buyers, 1985–1989
- Alan Bishop, 1989–1994
- Clive Fairweather, 1994–2002
- Andrew McLellan, 2002–2009
- Brigadier Hugh Munro, 2009–2013
- David Strang, 2013–2018
- Wendy Sinclair-Gieben 2018–2024

== See also ==
- Scots law
- Scottish Courts and Tribunals Service
- State Hospitals Board for Scotland
- HM Chief Inspector of Prisons
- HM Inspectorate of Prisons for England & Wales
