= Andrew McLellan =

The Very Reverend Andrew McLellan
- Church: Church of Scotland

Personal details
- Born: 16 June 1944 (age 81)
- Spouse: Irene McLellan
- Children: 2 (including twin sons, Andi and Ian)
- Occupation: Minister
- Education: University of St Andrews; University of Glasgow; Union Theological Seminary (New York City)

Moderator of the General Assembly of the Church of Scotland
- In office 2000–2001

Her Majesty's Chief Inspector of Prisons for Scotland
- In office 2002–2009

Personal details
- Awards: Commander of the Order of the British Empire (CBE)

Andrew Rankin Cowie McLellan CBE is a retired Scottish minister of the Church of Scotland. He served as Her Majesty's Chief Inspector of Prisons for Scotland from 2002 to 2009 and was Moderator of the General Assembly of the Church of Scotland in 2000.

== Early life and education ==
McLellan was born on 16 June 1944, and was educated at Kilmarnock Academy and Madras College in St Andrews, before attending the University of St Andrews, the University of Glasgow, and Union Theological Seminary (New York City).

== Ministry ==
McLellan began his ministry as Assistant Minister at St George's West Church, Edinburgh (1969–1971). He then served as Minister at Cartsburn Augustine Church, Greenock (1971–1980), during which time he was also an elected member of Inverclyde District Council (1977–1980). He later became Minister of Viewfield Parish Church, Stirling (1980–1986), and St Andrew's and St George's Church, Edinburgh (1986–2002).

While a minister, he was saved from drowning by a lifeguard on the Californian coast while swimming with Bob Brown (brother of Craig Brown). He later married her to her husband in the USA.

He was Convener of the Church of Scotland's Church and Nation Committee (1992–1996), the Parish Development Fund (2002–2006), and the World Mission Council (2010–2014). He also served as Chaplain to the Boys' Brigade (UK and ROI) (2013–2016). McLellan is the author of two books on faith and public service.

== Later career ==
In 2002, McLellan was appointed Her Majesty's Chief Inspector of Prisons for Scotland, a position he held until 2009. In recognition of his service, he was appointed Commander of the Order of the British Empire (CBE) in the 2009 Birthday Honours.

In 2013, McLellan was appointed chair of what became known as the McLellan Commission, an independent review of safeguarding practices within the Scottish Catholic Church. The commission, announced by the Bishops' Conference of Scotland in November 2013, published its findings—the McLellan Report—on 18 August 2015. The report acknowledged that "there is no doubt that abuse of the most serious kind has taken place within the Catholic Church in Scotland" and assessed the Church's responses.

Reception of the report was mixed. The Observer columnist Kevin McKenna described it as "a whitewash... so soft and fluffy that it should have been delivered with a big pink ribbon tied around it and pictures of Walt Disney characters on its cover". Journalist Catherine Deveney, however, called it "neither timid nor deferential", though she added that repentance and genuine reform were needed. The Tablet praised it as "a masterpiece of its kind that deserves to be studied", calling it "a vote of no confidence in the Scottish bishops' safeguarding procedures".

In 2017, McLellan became chair of the Scottish Prison Visitor Centre Steering Group.

He had been the Convenor of the Friends of St Andrew's Jerusalem and Tiberias - which supports the Church of Scotland presence across Israel, until May 2025.

== Personal life ==
McLellan was married to Irene, and the couple has twin sons, Andi and Ian. His wife, Irene, died on 30 January 2026. She had been a member of the Church of Scotland World Mission Committee, and its Middle East Committee. She was a member of the Friends of St Andrew's Jerusalem and Tiberias. He resides in Dunfermline. Following the end of his Moderatorial year, his formal title is The Very Reverend Dr Andrew McLellan.

== See also ==
- Church of Scotland
- List of Moderators of the General Assembly of the Church of Scotland
- Her Majesty's Chief Inspector of Prisons (England and Wales)

Religious titles
Preceded by John B. Cairns	Moderator of the General Assembly of the Church of Scotland; 2000–2001	Succeeded by John D. Miller
