= His Majesty's Inspectorate of Constabulary in Scotland =

Public body in Scotland

Agency overview
- Type: Inspectorate
- Jurisdiction: Scotland
- Headquarters: St Andrew's House, Edinburgh, Scotland
- Motto: Improving policing across Scotland
- Minister responsible: Keith Brown, Cabinet Secretary for Justice
- Agency executive: Craig Naylor, HM Chief Inspector of Constabulary in Scotland
- Parent organisation: Scottish Government
- Website: hmics.scot

His Majesty's Inspectorate of Constabulary in Scotland (HMICS) is a public body of the Scottish Government that reports to the Scottish Parliament. It has statutory responsibility for the inspection of the effectiveness and efficiency of the police service in Scotland.

HMICS is part of a tripartite distribution of powers for accountability for the Scottish police service. The Scottish Government has powers to make regulations for the governance and administration of the police force and the promotion of efficiency. The Scottish Police Authority is responsible for setting the budget and ensuring that best value is attained for the public purse. The chief constable is responsible for operational policing.

The head of the service is HM Chief Inspector of Constabulary, held by Craig Naylor since March 2022.

The HMICS is based at St Andrew's House in Edinburgh and had £1.2m of funding allocated by the Scottish Government in 2013–14.

== History ==
HMICS was established by the Police (Scotland) Act 1857.

Until 1 April 2013, HMICS was responsible for inspections of the eight Scottish territorial police forces, the Scottish Crime and Drug Enforcement Agency, the Scottish Criminal Record Office, the Scottish Police College and the Scottish Police Information Strategy.

Until 1 April 2007, HMICS was also responsible for dealing with complaints against the police; since then non-criminal complaints have been dealt with by the Police Complaints Commissioner, following the passing of the Police, Public Order and Criminal Justice (Scotland) Act 2006. HMIC has no authority to deal with complaints against chief police officers.

== List of chief inspectors ==
- John Kinloch, 1857–1872
- Charles Carnegie, 1872–1884
- David Monro, 1884–1904
- Arthur George Ferguson, 1904–1927
- William David Allan, 1927–1930
- Robert Maxwell Dudgeon, 1930–1945
- Sidney Anderson Kinnear, 1946–1957
- Thomas Renfrew, 1958–1966
- Andrew Meldrum, 1966–1969
- David Gray, 1970–1979
- Edward Frizzell, 1979–1983
- Alexander Morrison, 1983–1990
- Colin Sampson, 1991–1993
- John MacInnes Boyd, 1993–1996
- William George MacKenzie Sutherland, 1996–1998
- William Taylor, 1999–2001
- Hugh Roy Graham Cameron, 2002–2004
- Andrew Gibson Brown, 2004–2007
- Paddy Tomkins, 2007–2009
- Andrew Laing, 2010–2013
- George Graham, 2013–2014
- Derek Penman, 2014–2018
- Gill Imery, 2018 – March 2022
- Craig Naylor, 2022–present

== See also ==
- His Majesty's Inspectorate of Constabulary and Fire & Rescue Services
- Criminal Justice Inspection Northern Ireland
- Public bodies of the Scottish Government
