= John Kinloch (police officer) =

John Kinloch , of Kirriemuir, was the first Chief Inspector of Constabulary for Scotland.

== Notes ==
Police appointments
Preceded by Inaugural appointment	HM Chief Inspector of Constabulary for Scotland; 1857–1872	Succeeded by Charles Carnegie
