= Robert Maxwell Dudgeon =

Brigadier-General Robert Maxwell Dudgeon CBE DSO MC JP
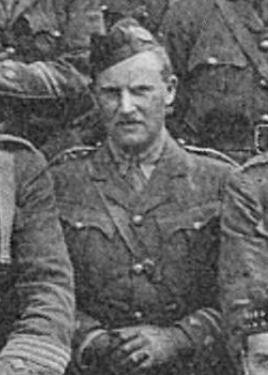
- Dudgeon when adjutant of 9th Royal Scots, 1915
- Born: 20 February 1881
- Died: 6 November 1962 (aged 81)
- Military career
- Allegiance: United Kingdom
- Branch: British Army
- Service years: 1901–1920
- Rank: Brigadier-general
- Commands: 16/Royal Warwickshire Regiment; 1/Queen's Own Cameron Highlanders; 51st Infantry Brigade; 51/Gordon Highlanders
- Conflicts: Second Boer War; First World War

Robert Maxwell Dudgeon, CBE, DSO, MC, JP (20 February 1881 – 6 November 1962) was a British Army officer and civil servant.

The eldest son of Colonel Robert Francis Dudgeon, CB, he was educated at Uppingham School and Loretto School. Following nomination from the Authorities of Public Schools, he was commissioned into the Queen's Own Cameron Highlanders as a second lieutenant on 5 January 1901.

He saw active service with the 1st Battalion of his regiment in South Africa, during the Second Boer War. After the war ended in June 1902, Dudgeon and other men of the 1st battalion left Cape Town in the SS Dunera in late September 1902, arriving at Southampton early the following month.

He served in the First World War, becoming a brigade commander and being granted the temporary rank of brigadier general while employed in this role.

He went on to become an honorary brigadier general before he retired from the army in 1920.

From 1920 to 1930, he was Governor of HM Prison Edinburgh; and from 1930 to 1945 Chief Inspector of Constabulary for Scotland.

== Notes ==
Police appointments
Preceded by William David Allan	HM Chief Inspector of Constabulary for Scotland; 1930–1945	Succeeded by Sidney Anderson Kinnear
