= Scottish Chief Constables Association =

The Scottish Chief Constables Association was a professional body within which the leaders of Scotland's county constabularies and burgh police forces could meet to socialise, discuss policy, prepare documents and communicate with other organisations with a stake in law enforcement. It also liaised with the ACPO.
