= Robert Francis Dudgeon =

Robert Francis Dudgeon CB VD (23 September 1851 – 4 October 1932) was Lord-Lieutenant of Kirkcudbrightshire from 1908 until his death, in 1932.

He was educated at Rugby and Trinity College, Cambridge. He served in the HM Reserve Forces for 43 years; Director of the Highland and Agricultural Society, 23 years; Vice-Convener of Kirkudbright County Council for 21 years; Governor of the West of Scotland Agricultural College for 14 years; Chairman of the Kirkcudbright School Board for 13 years; and a JP for Dumfriesshire for 8 years.

His son was also a distinguished public servant.

Honorary titles
Preceded by Marmaduke Constable-Maxwell, 11th Lord Herries of Terregles	Lord Lieutenant of Kirkcudbright; 1908–1932	Succeeded by Randolph Stewart, 12th Earl of Galloway
