= David Strang (police officer) =

David James Reid Strang CBE QPM is a former senior police officer and public servant from Scotland. He has worked in a number of senior roles in the criminal justice sector, most notably as Chief Constable of Lothian and Borders Police and Her Majesty's Chief Inspector of Prisons for Scotland.

== Early life and education ==
Strang was born in Glasgow and studied at Glasgow Academy and Loretto School. He then went on to study engineering science at the University of Durham, graduating with a BSc degree, before studying for an MSc degree in organisational behaviour at the University of London.

== Police career ==
Strang began his police career with the Metropolitan Police in 1980. He was posted to a number of divisions as well as time with Criminal Investigation Department, Territorial Support Group and a secondment to the Police Staff College, Bramshill. After rising to divisional commander of Wembley Division, he left the force in 1998 and was appointed assistant chief constable of Lothian and Borders Police.

In August 2001, Strang was appointed chief constable of Dumfries and Galloway Police. He led a number of initiatives, focusing on alcohol and drug action as well as youth justice and was president of the Association of Chief Police Officers in Scotland during the 2004–2005 year. On 29 March 2007, he was appointed chief constable of Lothian and Borders Police and served in that role until the force was amalgamated into Police Scotland.

== Work with prisons ==
Strang was a member of the Scottish Prisons Commission which published a report entitled Scotland's Choice in 2008. In 2013, he was appointed as Her Majesty's Chief Inspector of Prisons for Scotland in succession to Hugh Munro, a post which he held until 2018. He was subsequently appointed as chair of the Independent Inquiry into Mental Health Services in Tayside.

== Drug Deaths Taskforce ==
Strang was appointed Chair of the Scottish Government's Drugs Death Taskforce in January 2022, following the resignation of Professor Catriona Matheson in December 2021.

== Honours and awards ==
- He received the honorary degree of Doctor of the University (DUniv) from the University of Stirling on 23 November 2018.

Ribbon	Description	Notes
	Order of the British Empire (CBE)	Commander; Civil Division; 2019 Queen's Birthday Honours List; For services to law and order
	Queen's Police Medal (QPM)	2002
	Queen Elizabeth II Golden Jubilee Medal	2002; UK version of this medal
	Queen Elizabeth II Diamond Jubilee Medal	2012; UK version of this medal
	Police Long Service and Good Conduct Medal	

Police appointments
Preceded by Paddy Tomkins	Chief Constable of Lothian and Borders Police; 2007-2013	Forced merged into Police Scotland
Government offices
Preceded by Hugh Munro	Her Majesty's Chief Inspector of Prisons for Scotland; 2013-2018	Succeeded by Wendy Sinclair-Gieben
