= John Kinloch (cricketer) =

Australian cricketer (1833–1897)

Personal information
- Born: 1833; Dublin, Ireland
- Died: 9 April 1897 (aged 63–64); Camperdown, New South Wales, Australia
- Bowling: Right-arm fast-medium under-arm

Domestic team information
- Years: Team
- 1858–59 to 1861–62: New South Wales
- Source: ESPNcricinfo, 3 January 2017

John Kinloch (1833 – 9 April 1897) was an Australian cricketer. He played three first-class matches for New South Wales between 1858/59 and 1861/62.

Kinloch was one of the earliest graduates of Sydney University, where he obtained a Master of Arts degree; he later served in the position of Esquire Bedell at the university. He taught mathematics part-time at Sydney Grammar School in the late 1850s and 1860s. Two of his pupils there, the brothers Frank and Alexander Jardine, later named Kinloch Creek on Cape York Peninsula after him. Another of his notable pupils there was Edmund Barton, who later became Australia's first Prime Minister.

Kinloch was for many years one of the best-known coaches for university examinations in Sydney. He established a college, but he lost money in land speculation, and he died after financial difficulties and illness, leaving a widow.

Although he was a big man who moved slowly, Kinloch was a fast-medium under-arm bowler, renowned for his accuracy, who spun the ball from the leg. He took 4 for 14 and 4 for 56 in the match against Victoria in January 1859. As he was near-sighted, he wore a monocle while playing. He was also a noted yachtsman.
