= Andrew Cameron (police officer) =

Andrew Cameron, CBE QPM, is the former Chief Constable, Central Scotland Police.

He joined the police as a cadet at the age of 15. As a police-sponsored student, he graduated with a BA in Business Administration from the University of Strathclyde in 1983. He rose to be the Chief Constable of Central Scotland Police (2000-2008) and served as president of the Association of Chief Police Officers Scotland.

He was appointed a CBE for services to the police in the New Year Honours 2008.

In 2008, he was awarded Alumnus of the Year by the University of Strathclyde.

== Honours ==

Ribbon	Description	Notes
	Order of the British Empire (CBE)	2008
	Queen's Police Medal (QPM)	
	Queen Elizabeth II Golden Jubilee Medal	
	Police Long Service and Good Conduct Medal	
