= Paisley Burgh Police =

The Paisley Burgh Police was the police force responsible for the town of Paisley, Scotland until it was subsumed into the Strathclyde Police.
