= Arthur Ferguson (police officer) =

British police officer (1862–1935)

Lieutenant-Colonel Sir Arthur Ferguson CBE

His Majesty's Inspector of Constabulary in Scotland
- In office 1904–1927

Personal details
- Born: 22 June 1862 British North America
- Died: 14 February 1935 (aged 72)
- Occupation: British Army officer

Lieutenant-Colonel Sir Arthur George Ferguson CBE (22 June 1862 – 14 February 1935) was a British Army officer and police officer, who served as His Majesty's Inspector of Constabulary in Scotland.

== Family ==
Ferguson was the eldest son of Lieutenant-Colonel George Arthur Ferguson (1835–1924), the sixth Laird of Pitfour, a large estate in the Buchan area of Aberdeenshire, north east Scotland. His mother was Nina Maria Hood, who was the eldest daughter of Alexander Nelson Hood, 1st Viscount Bridport.

== Career and early life ==
Ferguson was born in British North America while his father was posted overseas, but the family returned to Britain in 1864 and initially lived in London.

He went to Eton College in 1876 and was then in January 1883 commissioned as a lieutenant into the Rifle Brigade, in which he served for 22 years. He was promoted to captain on 1 January 1892, and from 2 June 1898 was a staff captain, serving as aide-de-camp to Lord William Seymour, Commander of the British Troops in Canada. In April 1900, he left the United Kingdom on the SS Scot bound for South Africa, where he served as a staff officer on special service during the Second Boer War. He was promoted to major in February 1901 after which, in October that year, he returned to his father's estate at Pitfour. He married Janet Norah Baird (1878-1943), a daughter of Sir Alexander Baird, in London in 1902.

In 1904 he was appointed His Majesty's Inspector of Constabulary for Scotland and served in this role until 1927, although he rejoined the Army during the First World War.

He was appointed Commander of the Order of the British Empire (CBE) in the 1920 civilian war honours and knighted on his retirement in the 1927 Birthday Honours.

He died at the age of 72. His son, Angus Arthur Ferguson (born 1903), also became a police officer, eventually serving as Chief Constable of Northamptonshire from 1931.

== Bibliography ==
- Buchan, Alex R. (2008). Pitfour -The Blenheim of the North. Peterhead: Buchan Field Club. ISBN 978-0-9512736-4-7.
