= Grampian Police =

Former police force for northeast Scotland

- Motto: Semper Vigilo

Agency overview
- Formed: 16 May 1975; 51 years ago (merger)
- Dissolved: 1 April 2013; 13 years ago
- Superseding agency: Police Service of Scotland

Jurisdictional structure
- Operations jurisdiction: Aberdeen City, Aberdeenshire and Moray, Scotland
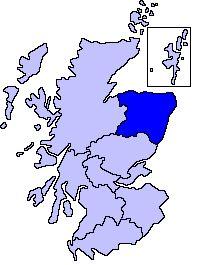
- Map of Grampian Police's jurisdiction
- Area: 8,737 km^{2}
- Population: 525,936 (2001 census)

Operational structure
- Headquarters: Aberdeen
- Sworn members: As of 2008/2009: 1,543 Police Officers; 181 Special Constables; 851 Support Staff; 18 Cadets
- Agency executive: Colin McKerracher, chief constable
- Divisions: Three: Aberdeen City Moray Aberdeenshire

Facilities
- Stations: 46

Website
- www.grampian.police.uk

Grampian Police was the territorial police force of the north-east of Scotland. It operated between 1975 and 2013, when it was replaced by Police Scotland. From 1996, it covered the council areas of Aberdeenshire, the Aberdeen City, and Moray (the former Grampian region). The Force area also covered some of the North Sea, giving Grampian Police the responsibility of policing the oil and gas platforms of the North East. The force was headquartered in Aberdeen.

The Police Authority had six representatives from Aberdeen City, six from Aberdeenshire, and four from Moray.

The force produced a quarterly magazine called The Informer for its staff, and, in 2009, launched a YouTube channel.

== History ==
Grampian Police was formed on 16 May 1975, when Grampian Region was created, a merger of the previously formed Scottish North Eastern Counties Constabulary and the Aberdeen City Police. The North Eastern force had been formed on 16 May 1949, by the merger of Aberdeenshire Constabulary, Banffshire Constabulary, Kincardineshire Constabulary, and Moray and Nairn Constabulary. The headquarters were situated in a newly constructed building on Queen Street in Aberdeen.

An Act of the Scottish Parliament, the Police and Fire Reform (Scotland) Act 2012, created a single Police Service of Scotland - known as Police Scotland - with effect from 1 April 2013. This merged the eight regional police forces in Scotland (including Grampian Police), together with the Scottish Crime and Drug Enforcement Agency, into a single service covering the whole of Scotland. Police Scotland has its headquarters at the Scottish Police College at Tulliallan in Fife.

The former Aberdeen headquarters has remained in use, however, in October 2020 Police Scotland announced that the building would be vacated the following year. Staff will move to other offices in Aberdeen and the area is set to be redeveloped. The public counter for the police will move to Marischal College.

== Areas covered ==
Grampian Police covered the local authority areas of Aberdeen City, Aberdeenshire and Moray. In addition to this, Grampian have a lead role in incidents on offshore installations in Scottish areas of the North Sea, irrespective of which police area the installation is situated. This arrangement exists due to Grampian's extensive experience in dealing with the offshore industry.

The railway stations and lines in the area are the responsibility of the British Transport Police, and a number of Ministry of Defence installations in the region are policed by the Ministry of Defence Police. However, as with all territorial police forces, the chief officer of Grampian Police is ultimately responsible in statute for all law and order in Grampian police area, irrespective as to whether a special police force is present.

== Departments and units ==
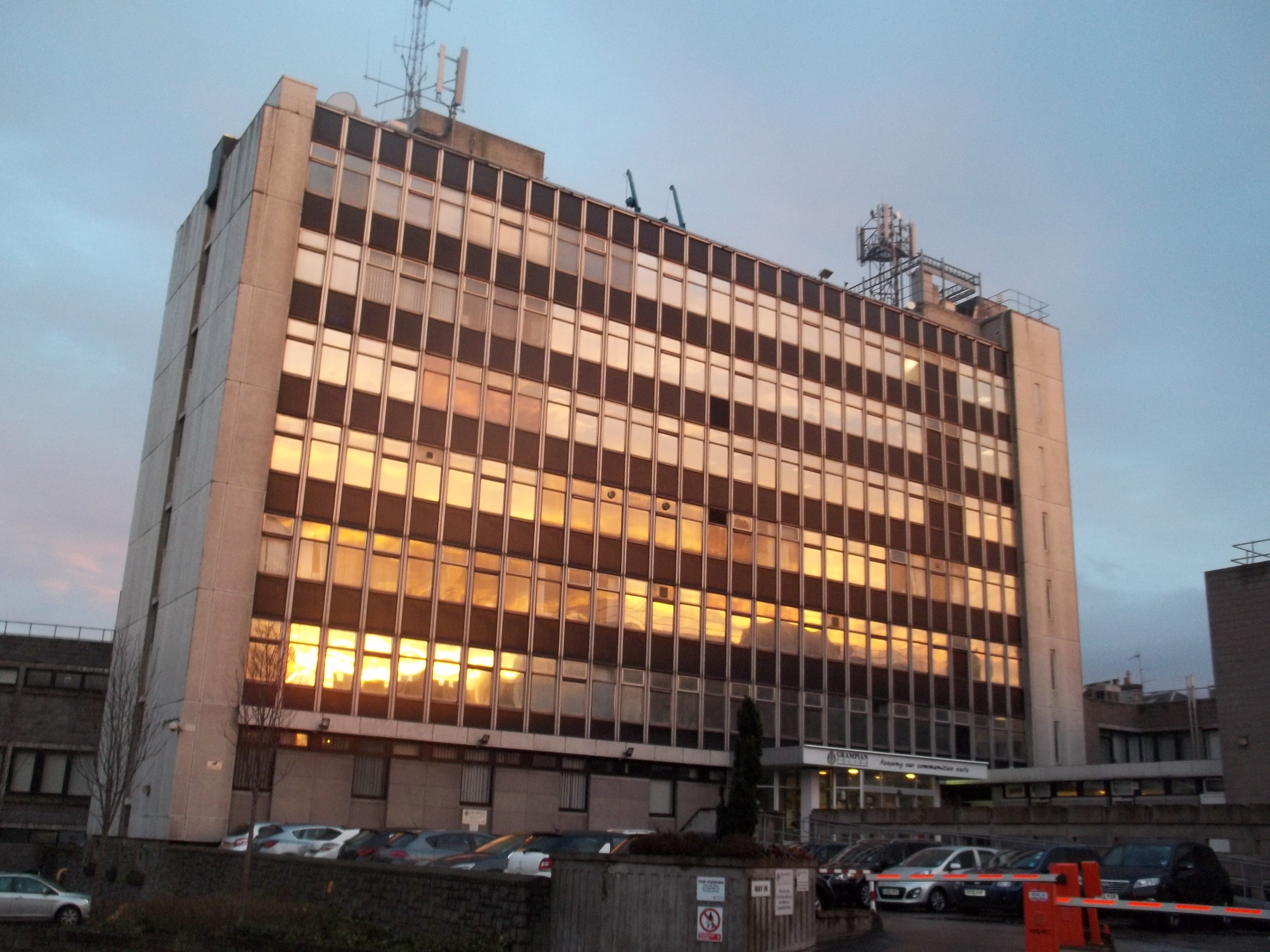
Grampian Police Headquarters at Queen Street in Aberdeen

Grampian Police had a number of specialist departments and units, with officers joining them and undertaking this as their primary role. Amongst others, these included:

- Grampian Police Mountain Rescue Team
- Dog Section
- Underwater Search Unit (Grampian's Underwater Search Unit was the regional USU for Grampian, Northern Constabulary, and Tayside Police.)
- Armed Response Vehicles
- Oil and Energy Liaison Unit
- Criminal Investigation Department
- Wildlife Crime Unit
- Roads Policing Department (formerly the Traffic Department)
- Special Branch
- Financial Investigation Unit
- Family Protection Unit
- Education Liaison
- Professional Standards and Conduct Department
- Human Resources (Recruitment & Training)
- General Enquiries Department
- Major Investigation Teams

=== Grampian Racist Incident Partnership ===
Grampian Racist Incident Partnership (GRIP) is a coalition of race equality groups led by Grampian Police officers. It was formed in May 2008 in response to a series of highly publicised racist assaults against Pakistani migrants and English travellers in Aberdeen.

In 2008 Grampian Police took part in the first GRIP campaign, designed to increase awareness in the bars and pubs of Aberdeen with an eye towards to protecting patrons from racist assaults. In 2010 it launched a campaign in conjunction with GRIP called 'RACISM – Report it Now!' The campaign involved putting up posters and stickers in shops, bars, restaurants, and post offices throughout the region urging people to report racist incidents.

GRIP had mixed results in its first two years. While the number of racist assaults against Pakistanis has been declining, there was a dramatic spike in 2009 in the number of assaults against people classified as "Other White" and "White British". Lewis Macdonald, the Labour member for Aberdeen Central, said the spike shows that "police are getting much better at recording a racial incident." Robert Brown, the Liberal Democrat member for Glasgow, said the spike was "truly shocking."

== Pipe band ==
The Grampian Police Pipe Band, established in 1907, often played at events and competitions throughout Scotland. The group rehearses on a weekly basis in Aberdeen and comprises both police staff and civilians. The band launched its own design of tartan in 2007 and performed for Queen Elizabeth at Balmoral Castle to celebrate its unveiling.

== Significant events and incidents ==
Grampian Police were involved in many high-profile cases throughout Scotland, either as the investigating force, reviewing investigations on behalf of other forces, or providing specialist support.

- Piper Alpha disaster (investigating force)
- Arlene Fraser murder case (investigating force)
- George Murdoch murder (investigating force)
- Michael Holding murder (investigating force)
- Scott Simpson murder (investigating force)
- Renee MacRae mystery (reviewing force)
- Jolanta Bledaite murder (specialist support – underwater search)
- April 2009 North Sea helicopter crash (investigating police force, in partnership with Air Accident Investigation Branch and other agencies)

== Chief constables ==
- Alexander Morrison (1975–1983)
- Alistair G. Lynn (1983–1990)
- Ian Oliver (1990–1998)
- Andrew Gibson Brown (1998–2004)
- Colin McKerracher (2004–2013)
