= Central Scotland Police =

- Motto: Together for Safer Communities

Agency overview
- Formed: 1975 (merger)
- Dissolved: 2013
- Superseding agency: Police Scotland

Jurisdictional structure
- Operations jurisdiction: Stirling, Falkirk, Clackmannanshire, Scotland
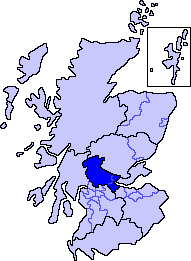
- Map of Central Scotland Police's jurisdiction
- Area: 2,643 km^{2}
- Population: 281,000
- Governing body: Scottish Government

Operational structure
- Headquarters: Stirling
- Sworn members: 820 + 100 Special Constables
- Agency executive: Derek Penman, Chief Constable
- Areas: 3

Facilities
- Stations: 22

Website
- www.centralscotland.police.uk

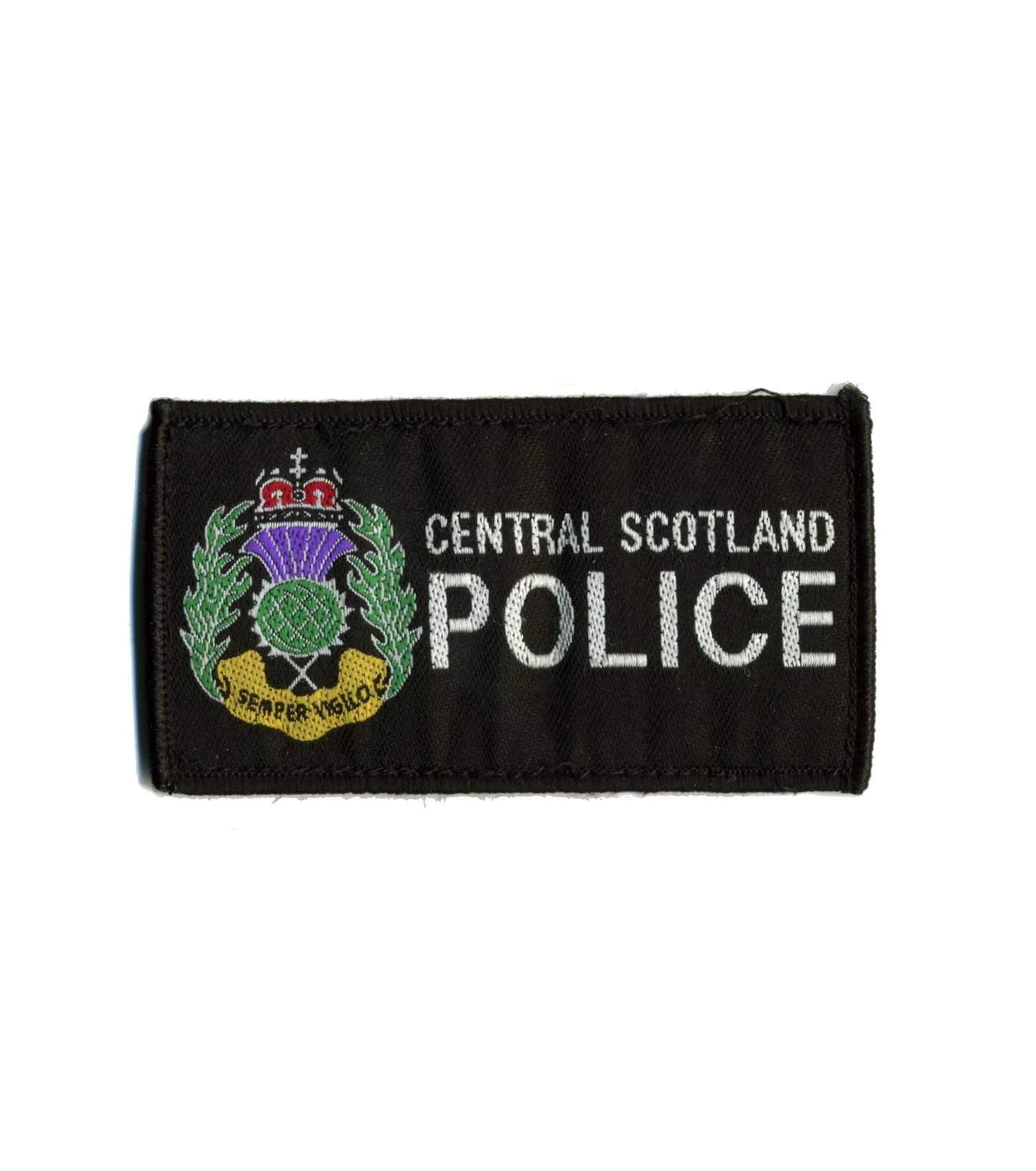
Central Scotland Police patch

Central Scotland Police was the territorial police force responsible for the Scottish council areas of Stirling, Falkirk and Clackmannanshire (the former Central region). The headquarters of the force were at Randolphfield House in Stirling.

Chief Constable Derek Penman was appointed in 2011. The force was heavily involved with policing the 31st G8 summit in 2005. Although the summit's venue, Gleneagles Hotel, fell within the responsibility of neighbouring Tayside Police, the temporary ecovillage encampment near Stirling and the southern approaches to the Gleneagles area were within the Central Scotland Police area.

The force was created on 16 May 1975, with the Central Scotland region, as a successor to the Stirling and Clackmannan Police, also taking the south-western portion of the Perth and Kinross Constabulary area.

An Act of the Scottish Parliament, the Police and Fire Reform (Scotland) Act 2012, created a single Police Service of Scotland - known as Police Scotland - which came into effect from 1 April 2013. This merged the eight regional police forces in Scotland, together with the Scottish Crime and Drug Enforcement Agency, into a single service covering the whole of Scotland. Police Scotland will have its headquarters at the Scottish Police College at Tulliallan in Fife.

== Force Area ==
Three Area Commands; Stirling, Falkirk and Clackmannanshire relate to the three Councils within the force area.

=== Stirling Area Command ===
Stirling (Force HQ) and Bannockburn.

Stirling Sub-Area Command: Aberfoyle, Arnprior, Balfron, Blanefield, Bridge of Allan, Callander, Crianlarich, Drymen, Dunblane, Killin and Lochearnhead.

=== Falkirk Area Command ===
Falkirk Sub-Area Command: Bainsford, Camelon and Falkirk (HQ).

Denny Sub-Area Command: Denny (HQ) and Stenhousemuir.

Grangemouth Sub-Area Command: Bo'ness, Grangemouth (HQ) and Maddiston.

=== Clackmannanshire Area Command ===
Alloa (HQ), Tillicoultry and Tullibody.

== Chief Constables ==
- Edward Frizzell (May 1975 – November 1979)
- Ian Oliver (November 1979 – November 1990)
- William Wilson (November 1990 – August 2000)
- Andrew Cameron (August 2000 – September 2008)
- Kevin Smith (October 2008 – November 2011)
- Derek Penman (November 2011 – March 2013)
