= Lothian and Borders Police =

Territorial Police Force in Scotland

- Motto: Semper Vigilo

Agency overview
- Formed: 1975
- Dissolved: 1 April 2013
- Superseding agency: Police Scotland
- Annual budget: £207.3m (2007/2008)

Jurisdictional structure
- Operations jurisdiction: Edinburgh, East Lothian, Midlothian, West Lothian, Scottish Borders, Scotland
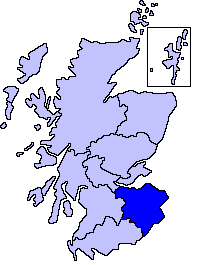
- Map of Lothian and Borders Police's jurisdiction
- Area: 6,453 km²
- Population: 920,164 (2007)

Operational structure
- Headquarters: Fettes, Edinburgh
- Sworn members: 2,905 (2008)
- Agency executive: David Strang, Chief Constable
- Divisions: 4

Facilities
- Stations: 51

Website
- www.lbp.police.uk

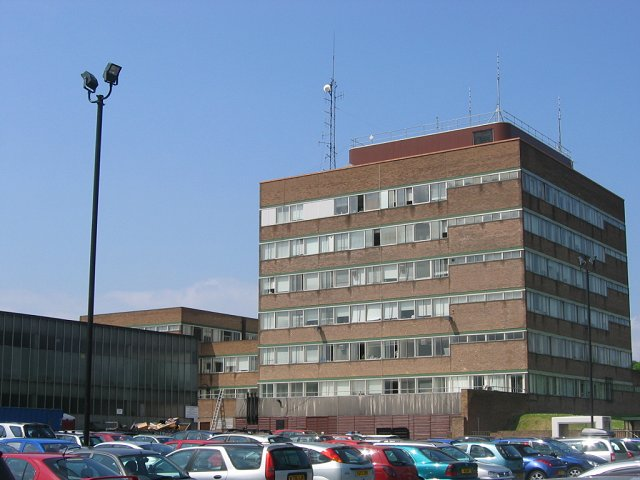
Lothian and Borders Police headquarters in Fettes

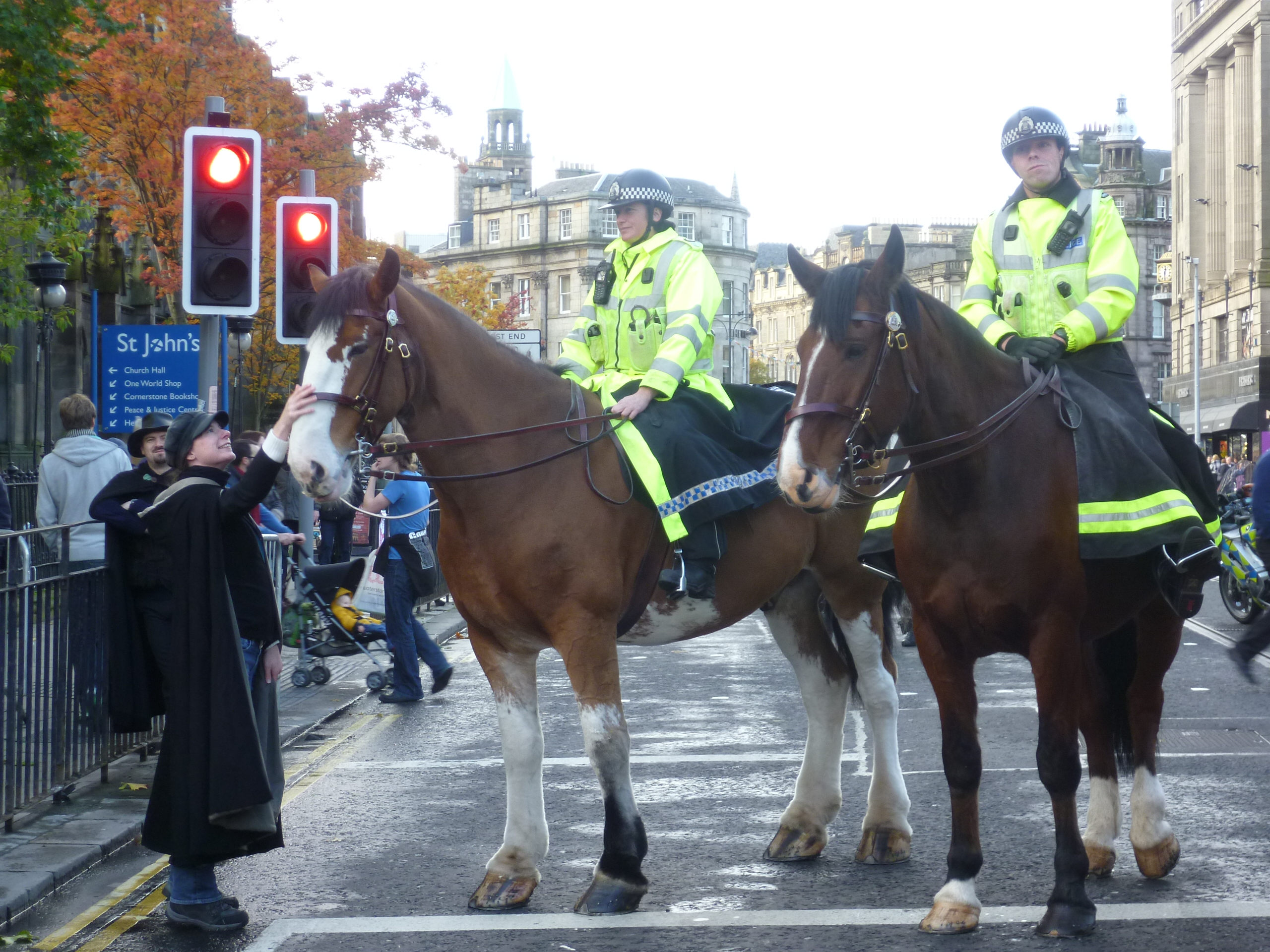
Mounted police in Edinburgh

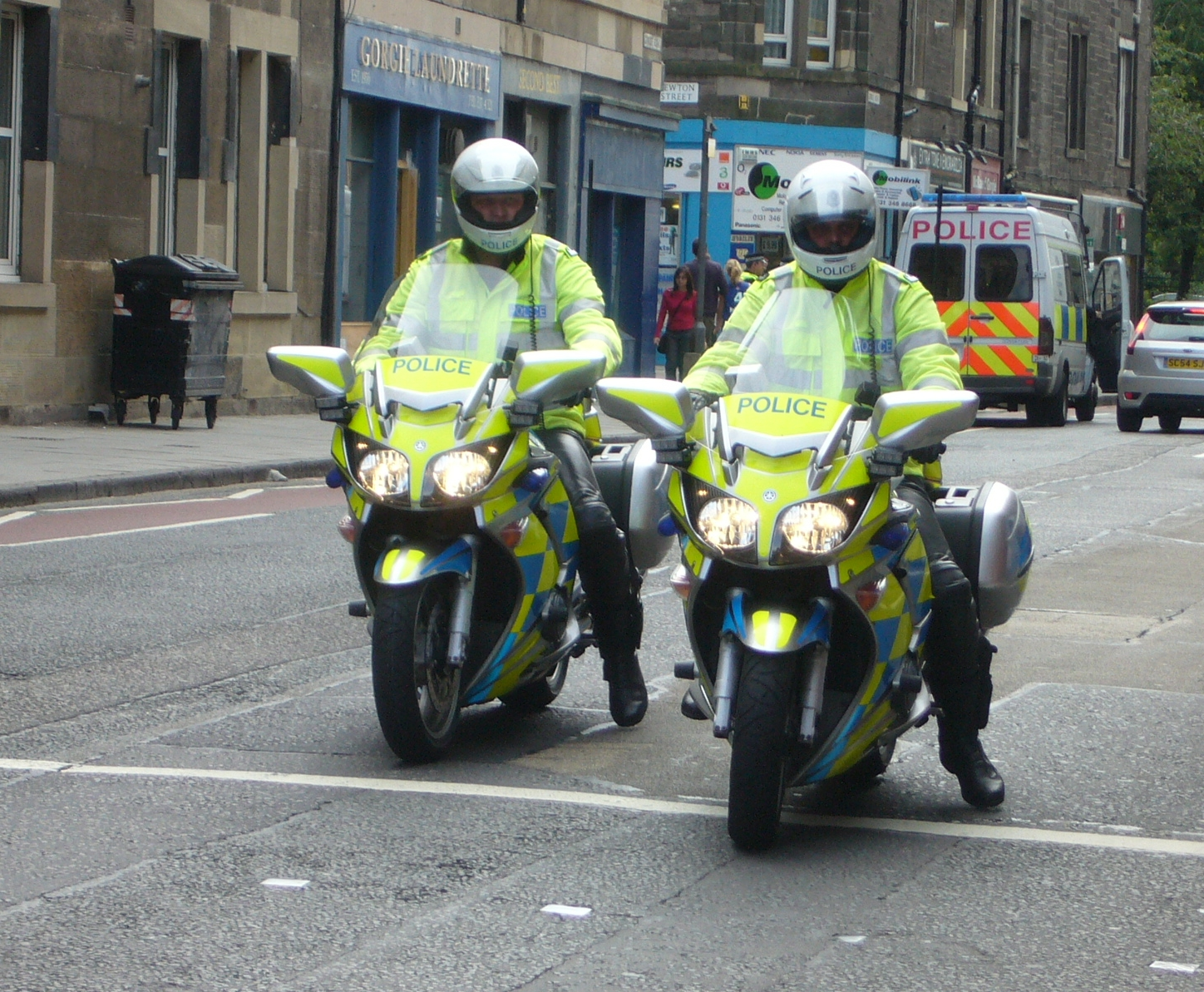
Motorcycle police in Edinburgh

Lothian and Borders Police was the territorial police force for the Scottish council areas of the City of Edinburgh, East Lothian, Midlothian, Scottish Borders and West Lothian between 1975 and 2013. The force's headquarters were in Fettes Avenue, Edinburgh.

Lothian and Borders Police was formed on 16 May 1975 by an amalgamation of Berwick, Roxburgh and Selkirk Constabulary; Edinburgh City Police; and The Lothians and Peebles Constabulary.

The force had 2,905 officers and 1,384 support staff as of March 2008. The force's last Chief Constable was David Strang who replaced Paddy Tomkins on 29 March 2007.

An Act of the Scottish Parliament, the Police and Fire Reform (Scotland) Act 2012, created a single Police Service of Scotland—known as Police Scotland—with effect from 1 April 2013. This merged the eight former regional police forces in Scotland (including Lothian & Borders Police), together with the Scottish Crime and Drug Enforcement Agency, into a single service covering the whole of Scotland. Police Scotland has its headquarters at the Scottish Police College at Tulliallan in Fife.

== Divisions ==
The Lothian and Borders Police area stretched from Blackridge in the west to Newcastleton in the south. It was split into four territorial divisions, and several other non-territorial divisions for specialist and administrative roles.

=== Territorial Divisions ===
A Division covered the City of Edinburgh council area, and was created in 2002 following the amalgamation of the City of Edinburgh's three previous divisions. It was the largest territorial division in terms of manpower and population. Its headquarters were St Leonards Police Station.

E Division covered East Lothian and Midlothian, stretching from the Edinburgh City Bypass to Dunbar in the east. Its headquarters were in Dalkeith.

F Division covered West Lothian with its headquarters in Livingston.

G Division was the largest territorial division in Lothian and Borders Police and covered the Scottish Borders. It was approximately twice the size of all the other divisions combined, bordering England in the south. It covered a predominantly rural area featuring rolling country side and isolated population areas. Its headquarters were in Hawick.

=== Non-territorial Divisions ===
C Division (Corporate Services) comprised such departments as Corporate Communications, Safer Communities, Complaints and Conduct and Business Improvement.

H Division was concerned with Personnel and Human Resources functions.

J Division was concerned with Secondments.

N Division was styled the "Criminal Justice Administration Department".

O Division (Operations) provided specialist operations support to the force. It was predominantly made up of the Roads Policing Units (traffic) which were based at the headquarters of each division. They also provided specialist Firearms and Public Order (Riot Police) support to all divisions. Also within O Division were the forces Dog Handlers. O Division also included The Force Communications Centre (FCC).

P Division was responsible for training and career development. Training of probationary constables was carried out jointly by the Scottish Police College based at Tulliallan Castle, "on the job" in the force area. Officers transferring from other Scottish forces were not required to attend the college, unlike those transferring from the rest of the United Kingdom, who were required to attend a conversion course to allow for adjustment to Scots law.

S Division was responsible for the financial management of the force.

X Division provided investigative support to the entire force. While detectives may have been allocated to assist other divisions as their main role as detectives, they could be pooled to provide assistance whether their specialist skills are required. Also known as the Criminal Investigation Department (CID) they were the detectives of the force and investigated major crimes as well as everyday crimes such as housebreaking.

Z Division was styled the "Central Services Department".

== Chief Constables ==
Chief Constables were:

- 1975–1983: Sir John Henry Orr
- 1983–1996: Sir William Sutherland
- 1996–2002: Sir Roy Cameron
- 2002–2007: Paddy Tomkins
- 2007–2013: David Strang

== See also ==
- Association of Chief Police Officers in Scotland
- Fettesgate
- Scottish Crime and Drug Enforcement Agency
- Scottish Police College
- Lothian & Borders Police Pipe Band
- Police Scotland
