= Strathclyde Police =

- Motto: Keeping People Safe (2009–2013)

Agency overview
- Formed: 1975 (merger)
- Dissolved: 1 April 2013
- Superseding agency: Police Scotland
- Annual budget: £638.96 million (2009–2010)

Jurisdictional structure
- Operations jurisdiction: Argyll and Bute, Glasgow City, East Ayrshire, East Dunbartonshire, East Renfrewshire, Inverclyde, North Ayrshire, North Lanarkshire, Renfrewshire, South Ayrshire, South Lanarkshire, West Dunbartonshire, Scotland
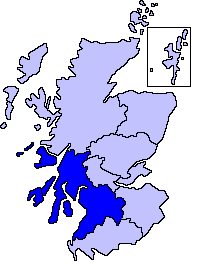
- Map of Strathclyde Police's jurisdiction
- Area: 13,624 km^{2}
- Population: approx. 2.3 million

Operational structure
- Headquarters: Glasgow
- Sworn members: 8,110 full-time police officers, 601 special constables (June 2011)
- Unsworn members: 2,474 civilian police staff (June 2011)
- Divisions: 8

Facilities
- Stations: 115
- Helicopters: 1

Strathclyde Police was the territorial police force responsible for the Scottish council areas of Argyll and Bute, Glasgow City, East Ayrshire, East Dunbartonshire, East Renfrewshire, Inverclyde, North Ayrshire, North Lanarkshire, Renfrewshire, South Ayrshire, South Lanarkshire and West Dunbartonshire (the former Strathclyde local government region) between 1975 and 2013. Its police authority had members from each of these council areas.

Of Scotland's eight police forces, Strathclyde Police had the most staff and served the largest population. Its area was the second largest, after that of Northern Constabulary.

An Act of the Scottish Parliament, the Police and Fire Reform (Scotland) Act 2012, created a single Police Service of Scotland, known as Police Scotland, with effect from 1 April 2013. The Act merged the eight regional forces, Strathclyde Police among them, and the Scottish Crime and Drug Enforcement Agency into one service for the whole of Scotland.

The force was portrayed in the television detective series Taggart.

== History ==
The force was created on 16 May 1975 as part of the restructuring of local government in Scotland. The police area matched the boundaries of the new Strathclyde Regional Council, which was broken up on 1 April 1996. It was formed from all or part of these forces:

- City of Glasgow Police
- Paisley Burgh Police
- Lanarkshire Constabulary
- Renfrew & Bute Constabulary
- Dunbartonshire Constabulary
- Argyll County Police
- Ayrshire Constabulary
- a small part of Stirling and Clackmannan Police

== Organisation ==
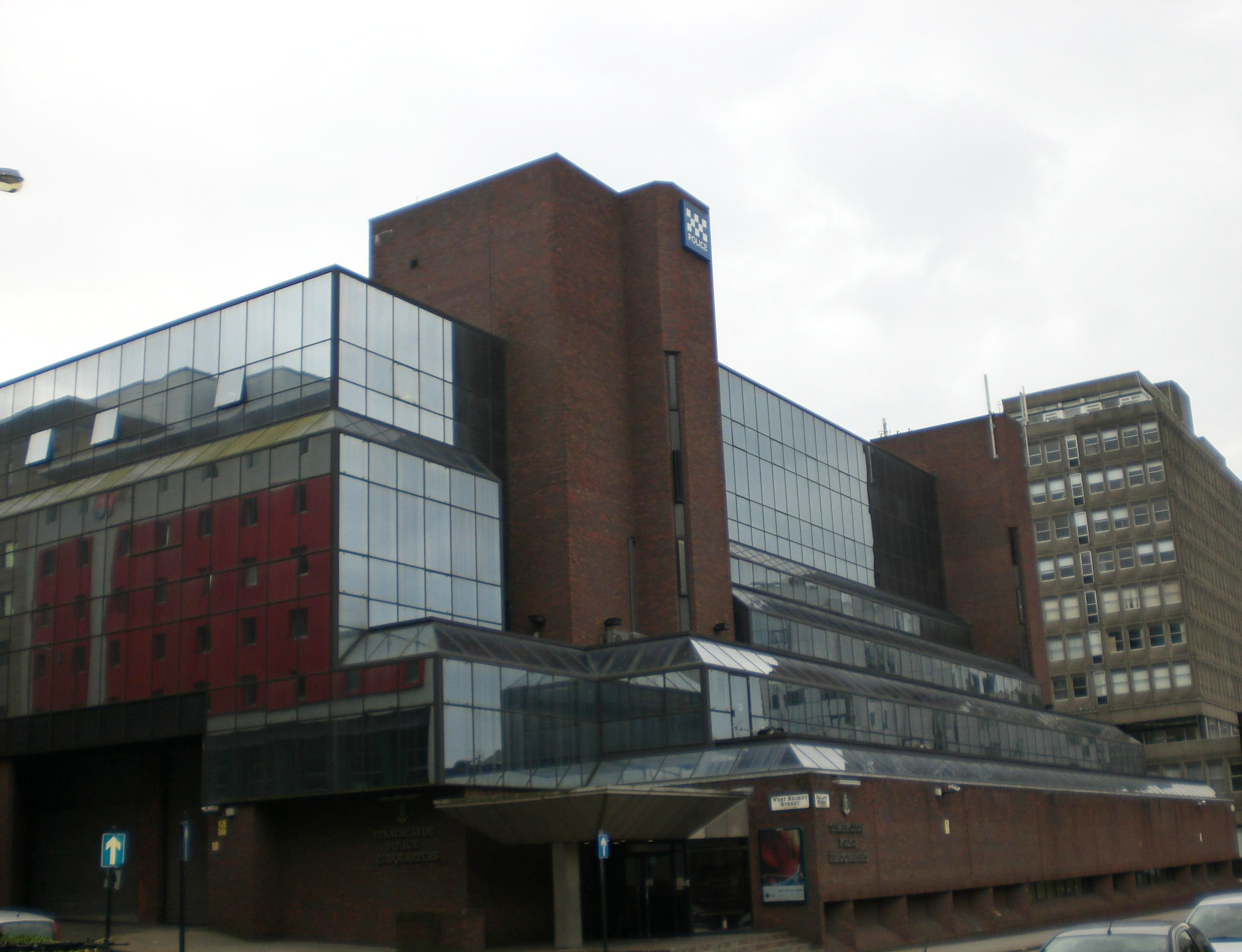
Strathclyde Police Headquarters at Pitt Street in Central Glasgow

The force was commanded by a chief constable, who in 2012 was supported by a deputy chief constable (DCC) and three assistant chief constables (ACCs).

From 23 October 2007 until its abolition, the force was organised into eight territorial divisions (A, B, G, K, L, N, Q and U), a Headquarters Division (H), a Support Services Division (V) and a Road Policing Division (T). Each territorial division was commanded by a chief superintendent, supported by two superintendents with various portfolios. The divisions were divided into subdivisions, and some of these into areas, each led by an area commander of chief inspector rank. There were 33 area commands in all.

=== Territorial divisions ===
- A Division – Glasgow Central and West
  - Glasgow Central
  - Glasgow West
  - Drumchapel
- B Division – Glasgow North East and East Dunbartonshire
  - Baird Street
  - London Road
  - Maryhill and Saracen
  - Shettleston, Easterhouse and Baillieston
- G Division – Glasgow South and East Renfrewshire
  - Cathcart
  - East Renfrewshire
  - Govan
  - New Gorbals
  - Pollok
- K Division – Renfrewshire and Inverclyde
  - Inverclyde
  - Johnstone and Renfrew
  - Paisley
- L Division – Argyll, Bute and West Dunbartonshire
  - Argyll and Bute
  - Clydebank, Dumbarton and Helensburgh
- N Division – North Lanarkshire
  - Bellshill
  - Cumbernauld and Kilsyth
  - Monklands
  - Motherwell and Wishaw
- Q Division – South Lanarkshire
  - Clydesdale
  - East Kilbride and Strathaven
  - Hamilton
  - Rutherglen and Cambuslang
- U Division – Ayrshire
  - East Ayrshire
  - North Ayrshire
  - South Ayrshire

In 2005, Strathclyde Police established its Violence Reduction Unit (VRU), to bring communities and agencies together to tackle the root causes of violence. In April 2006 the VRU's remit was extended to the whole of Scotland.

== Uniform and equipment ==
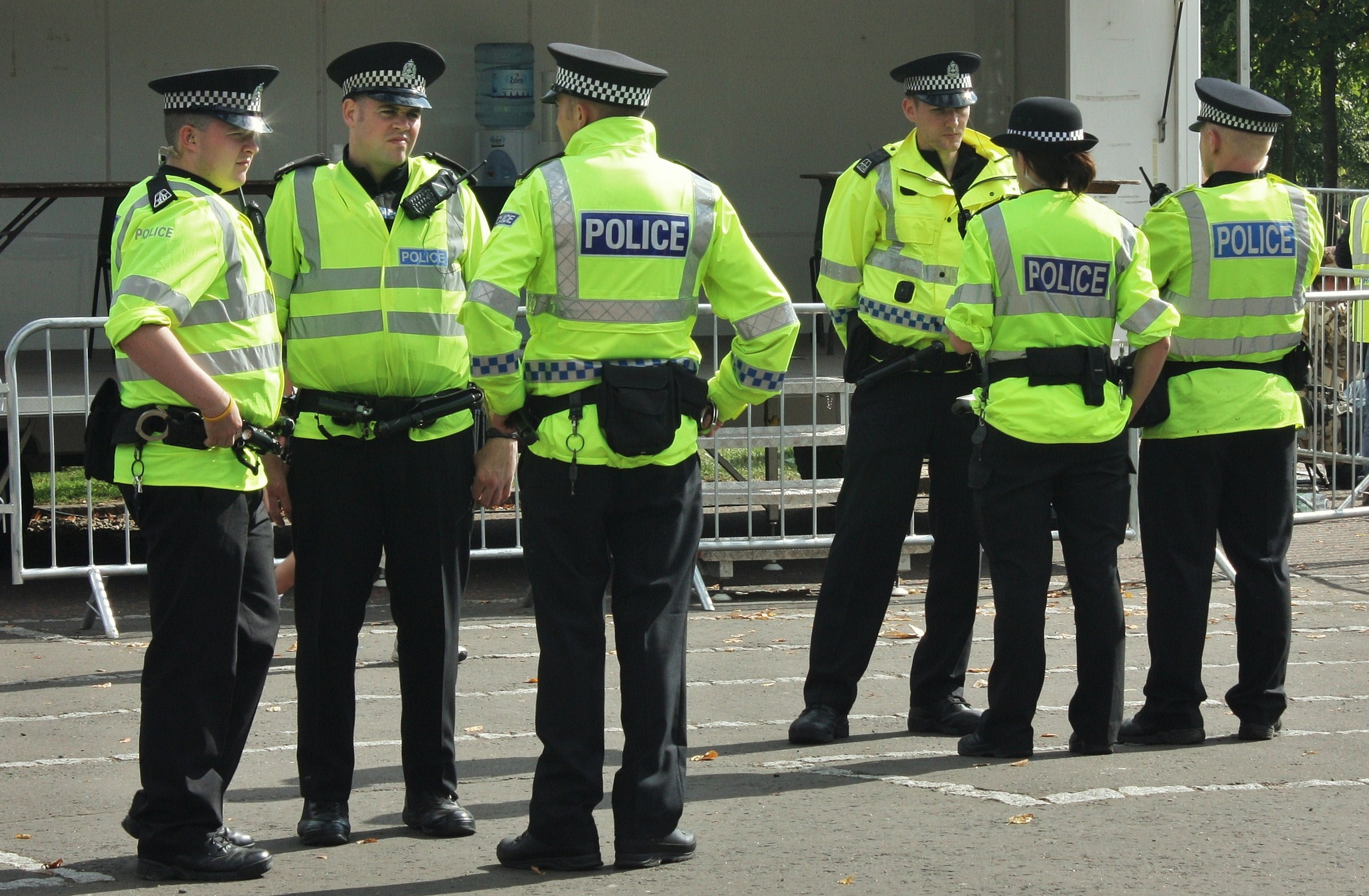
Police officers in Glasgow Green, Glasgow.

From its formation in 1975, the Strathclyde Police uniform was similar to that of its predecessor, the City of Glasgow Police, but with white shirts instead of blue. It consisted of an open-necked tunic and trousers, a white shirt and a black tie. By 1995 the tunic had been phased out in favour of a blue woollen NATO-style pullover and a utility belt, both introduced a few years earlier. Men wore a peaked cap and women a round, reinforced bowler-style hat. Both had a Sillitoe tartan band and the standard Scottish police cap badge, in metal for constables and sergeants and embroidered for inspectors and above. The caps of the Roads Policing Unit also had a white cover. Footwear was not prescribed, except in a few specialist roles such as public order.

Stab vests were introduced in 2001. At about the same time, the NATO jumpers were changed to black and made from the same material as the vest cover.

In February 2002 a trial uniform was introduced in K Division: a light blue shirt, with or without a tie, worn under body armour. Cargo trousers and fleeces were introduced at the same time.

The trial uniform proved unpopular and was changed again in September 2003. Shirts and ties were replaced altogether by a black, short-sleeved Under Armour-style wicking T-shirt with "POLICE" in white on both sleeves ("STRATHCLYDE POLICE" on shirts issued until 2006). The headgear, and the epaulettes showing the officer's divisional number and rank insignia, were unchanged. Cargo trousers were issued until 2008; after that, trousers had no cargo pockets, because the new body armour had pockets of its own.

A stab vest was worn over the T-shirt on all operational duties. The vests issued until 2008 looked like a sleeveless NATO jumper and were supplied by Highmark. Those issued from late 2008 had blue and white chequered reflective bands across the front and back, the force insignia sewn on the left breast (vests issued after the Police Scotland merger was announced had a reflective police badge instead), and a blue and white reflective (occasionally black and white embroidered) "POLICE" patch on the back. They had several attachments for handcuffs and other equipment. Until November 2009, a black fleece with the Strathclyde Police logo was worn over the body armour; it was then replaced by a microfleece. Officers also had a fluorescent bomber-style jacket with reflective markings like those on the stab vests, black waterproof trousers, and black (constables and sergeants) or brown (inspectors and above) leather gloves.

Personal equipment consisted of a police duty belt holding handcuffs (Hiatts Speedcuffs or TCH-840 rigid handcuffs), a 21 inches (53 cm) Autolock baton with a hinged cap (Mounted Unit officers had the longer 26 inches (66 cm) version) and CS spray. Officers also carried a small first aid kit, a torch, leg restraints, keys and a utility pouch. On duty they were issued Motorola MTH800 radio handsets, connected to the UK's Airwave TETRA radio network.

In 2006 this style of uniform, with slight variations in insignia, was adopted by every police force in Scotland except Northern Constabulary, which kept the collar and tie until 2009. Police Scotland later adopted it too.

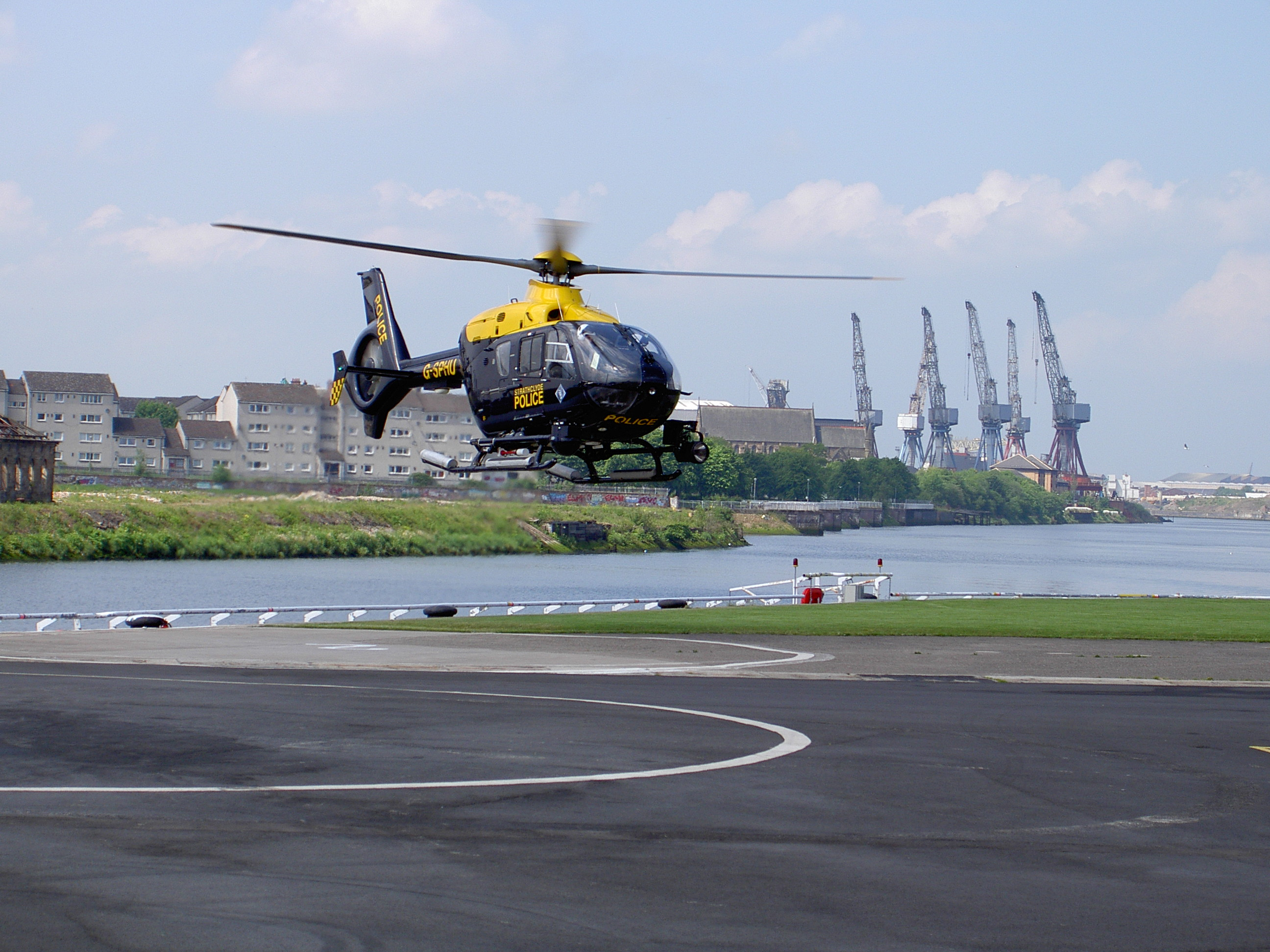
Strathclyde Police helicopter

The Strathclyde Police Air Support Unit operated Scotland's only police helicopter, a Eurocopter EC 135T2+ (G-SPAO) based at the Glasgow City Heliport. It was painted in the high-visibility dark blue and yellow scheme of the Police Scientific Development Branch, and was supplied under contract by Bond Air Services.

== Headquarters ==
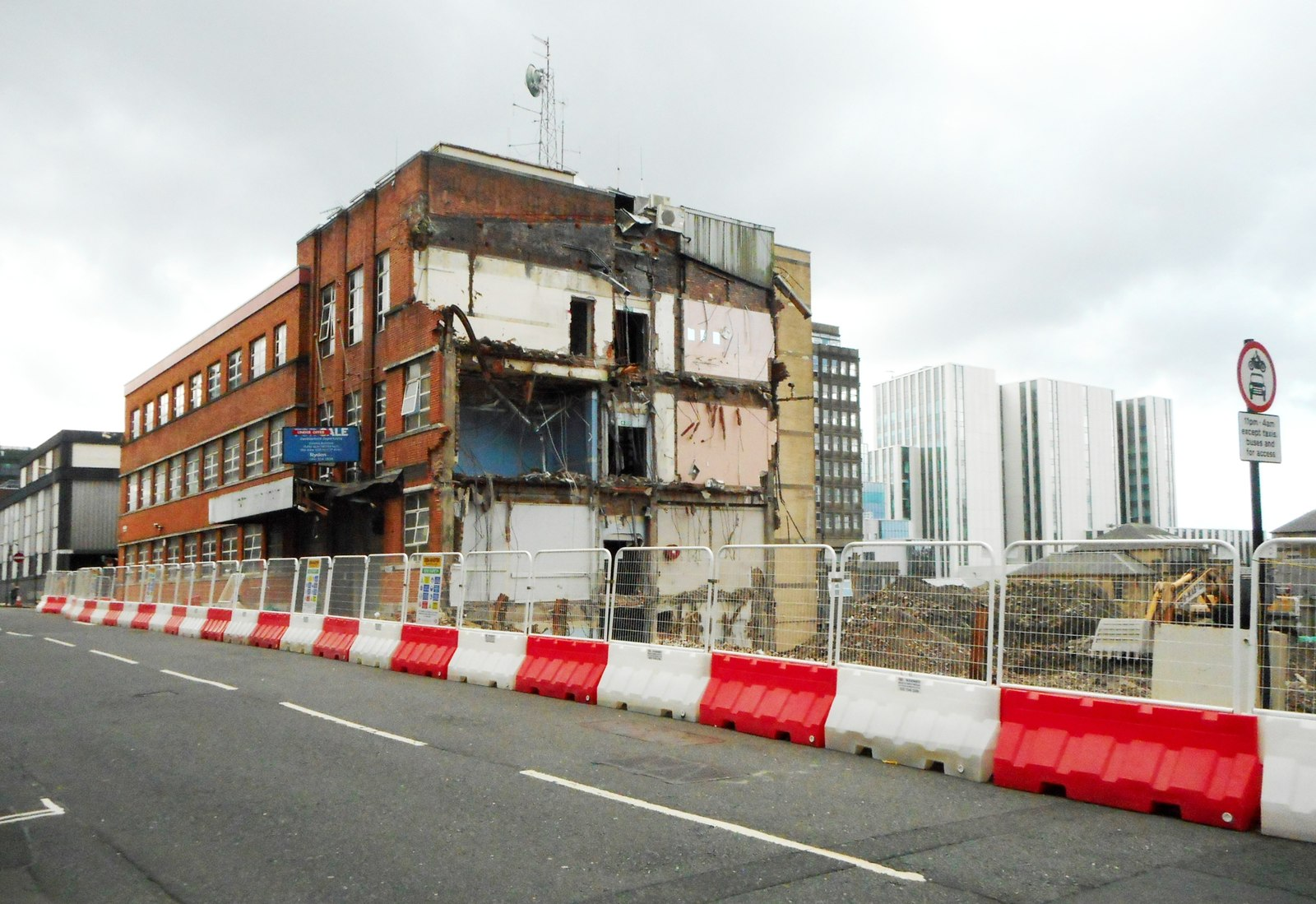
Pitt Street buildings during demolition, August 2019

The force's headquarters was on Pitt Street in Blythswood Hill, Glasgow. The building was put up in 1934 for the Glasgow and West of Scotland Commercial College, later the Scottish College of Commerce, which merged with the Royal College of Science and Technology in 1964 to form the University of Strathclyde. Before the force was abolished, there were plans to move its headquarters to Dalmarnock.

The Pitt Street buildings were demolished in 2019.

== Chief Constables ==
- 1975–1977: Sir David McNee (knighted in the 1978 New Year Honours)
- 1977–1985: Sir Patrick Hamill
- 1985–1991: (Sir) Andrew Kirkpatrick Sloan (knighted in the 1991 New Year Honours)
- 1991–1995: (Sir) Leslie Sharpe (knighted in the 1996 New Year Honours)
- 1996–2001: (Sir) John Orr
- 2001–2007: (Sir) William Rae
- 2007–2012: (Sir) Stephen House
- 2012–2013: Campbell Corrigan

== Priorities, 2009–2010 ==
In 2009–2010, Strathclyde Police concentrated its resources on these areas:

Violence, disorder and antisocial behaviour (including domestic abuse)

Murders fell by 26% and attempted murders by 15%, and 45,000 fixed penalty notices for disorder were issued.

Serious and organised crime

The force arrested 134 members of organised crime groups, recovered 82 firearms and seized £294,955 from the groups.

Drugs

There were 15,000 seizures of Class A and B drugs, and 2,500 kg of drugs, including amphetamines, cocaine and heroin, were seized and destroyed.

Terrorism

The UK was then at a heightened state of alert because of continuing threats from al-Qaeda, dissident IRA groups and domestic extremists. In 2007, Strathclyde Police had dealt with the attack on Glasgow Airport, in which five members of the public were injured and one of the two attackers later died in hospital.

== Pipe band ==
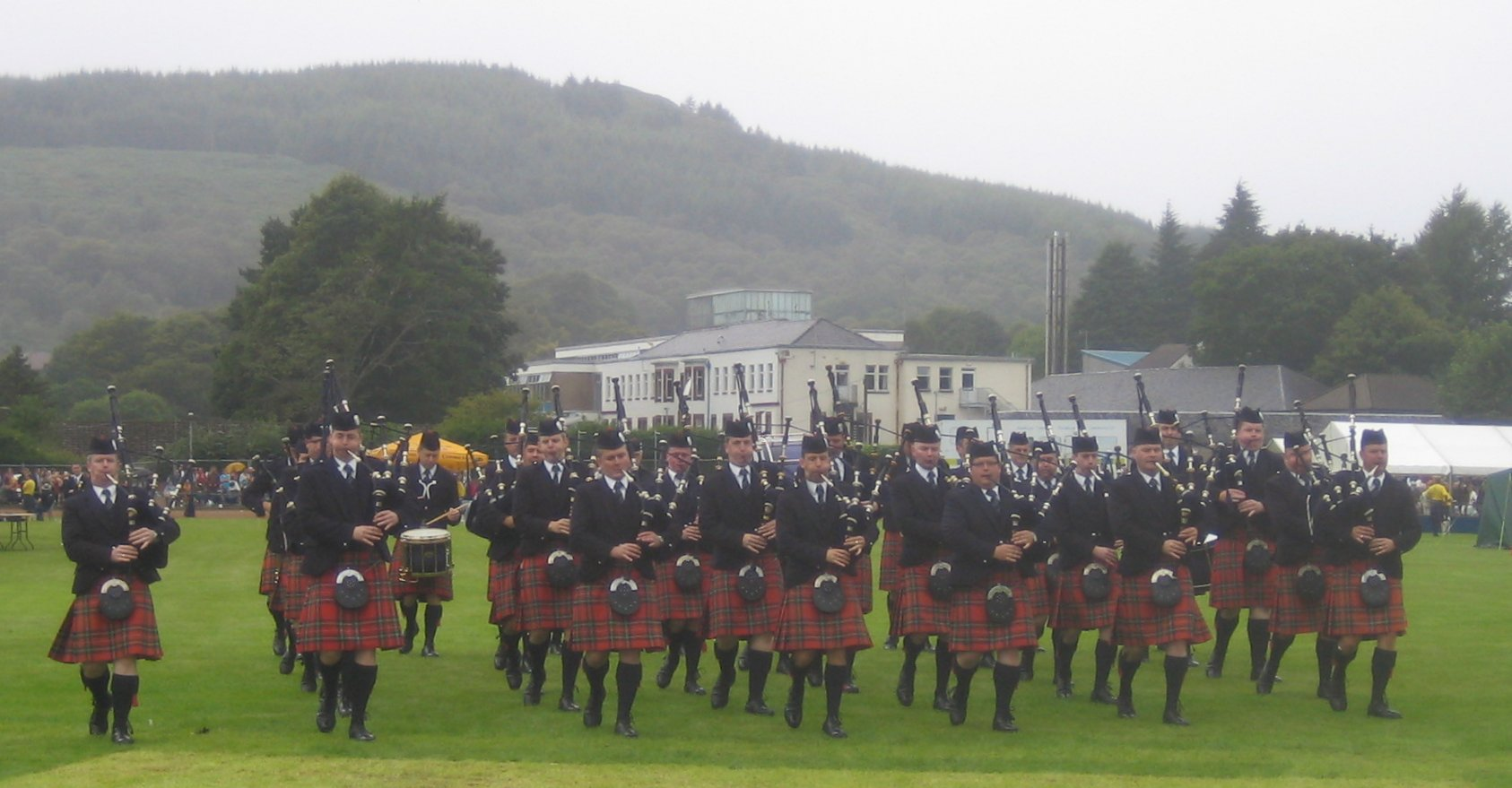
Strathclyde Police Pipe Band, pictured in 2007, led by Pipe Major Donald Mackay

Strathclyde Police inherited a competition pipe band from the City of Glasgow Police. The band drew pipers and drummers from five neighbouring forces that had bands of their own and, under Pipe Major Ian MacLellan BEM, won the World Pipe Band Championships in the premier grade 12 times, including a record six in a row from 1981 to 1986. Counting its years as the City of Glasgow Police Pipe Band, it won 20 world titles, more than any other band. The band's senior members were employed by the force: John Wilson, a former pipe sergeant, commanded one of its divisions soon after retiring from competition. After Strathclyde Police was abolished in 2013, the band competed as the Glasgow Police Pipe Band until 2021.
