= Alexander Russell =

Alexander Russell may refer to:

== Academics ==
- Alexander Russell (naturalist) (1715–1768), British physician and naturalist
- Alexander Russell (electrical engineer) (1861–1943), Scottish electrical engineer and educator
- Alexander Durie Russell (1872–1955), Scottish mathematician and astronomer

== Sportspeople ==
- Alex Russell (footballer, born 1923) (1923–2014), Northern Irish footballer for Linfield FC
- Alex Russell (footballer, born 1944), (1944–2012), English footballer for Southport FC
- Alex Russell (footballer, born 1973), English footballer
- Alexander Russell (cricketer) (born 1998), English cricketer
- Alex Russell (cricketer) (born 2002), English cricketer for Northamptonshire CCC

== Other people ==
- Alexander Russell (priest) (1803–1886), Dean of Adelaide
- Alexander Russel (1814–1876), Scottish newspaper editor
- Alexander James Russell (1814–1887), Scottish lawyer
- Lord Alexander Russell (1821–1907), British Army general
- Sir Fraser Russell (Alexander Fraser Russell, 1876–1952), acting Governor of Southern Rhodesia
- Alexander Russell (politician) (1879–1961), British Member of Parliament for Tynemouth, 1922–1945
- Alexander Russell (composer) (1880–1953), American composer, pianist, organist, impresario and the first Frick Professor of Music for Princeton University
- Alex Russell (actor) (born 1987), Australian actor

== See also ==
- Alex Russell (disambiguation)
- Alec Russell, English journalist
