= Alexander J. Russell =

Alexander J. Russell may refer to:

- Alexander James Russell, Scottish lawyer
- Alex Russell (footballer, born 1973) (Alexander John Russell), English footballer

== See also ==
- Alexander Russell (disambiguation)
- Alex Russell (disambiguation)
