= Rosemary Agnew =

Scottish Public Services Ombudsman

Scottish Public Services Ombudsman
- Incumbent
- Assumed office 1 May 2017

Scottish Information Commissioner
- In office 1 May 2012 – 30 April 2017

Rosemary Agnew is the current Scottish Public Services Ombudsman. She is the third person to hold this office, taking up the post in May 2017. She was formerly the Scottish Information Commissioner 2012–2017.

== Career ==
Agnew worked as an Assistant Ombudsman at the Local Government Ombudsman. Prior to appointment Rosemary was Chief Executive of the Scottish Legal Complaints Commission an appointment that she took up on 26 October 2010.

== Information Commissioner ==
She was nominated as the second Scottish Information Commissioner in February 2012. She took up office on 1 May 2012 for a fixed term of six years.

In 2012, Agnew responded to Labour Member of the European Parliament (MEP) Catherine Stihler's complaint, following Stihler's request to find out further details from the Scottish Ministers about whether they had sought legal advice over the position of an independent Scotland in the European Union. Deputy First Minister of Scotland Nicola Sturgeon MSP told the Scottish Parliament chamber on Tuesday 23 October 2012 that the Scottish Government had only now sought legal advice on the position of an independent Scotland in the European Union. As a result of this row Alex Salmond, the First Minister of Scotland, referred himself to the Parliamentary Standards Commissioner to determine whether he had broken the Ministerial Code. In January 2013 an independent adviser judged that neither Salmond nor the Scottish Government had breached the ministerial code.

On 3 February 2017, the Scottish Parliament announced that Agnew would be stepping down as Commissioner on 30 April 2017 and would take up a post as the Scottish Public Services Ombudsman on 1 May 2017.

Government offices
| Preceded by Kevin Dunion | Scottish Information Commissioner; 2012 — 2017 | Succeeded by Margaret Keyse |
| Preceded by Jim Martin | Scottish Public Services Ombudsman; 2017 — present | Incumbent |
