= Jim Martin (ombudsman) =

Scottish ombudsman

James Martin CBE is the chair of Scottish Legal Complaints Commission. He was Scotland's first independent police complaints commissioner 2007–2009 and was Scottish Public Services Ombudsman 2009–2017.

== Early life ==
Martin was born in Larbert, Scotland. He worked as an economics and modern studies teacher at Falkirk High School.

He was the chair of Educational Institute of Scotland from 1987 until 1995, then worked for the life assurance society Scottish Amicable.

== Ombudsman ==
In 2007, Martin was appointed as Scotland's first independent police complaints commissioner.

In March 2009, Parliament approved his appointment as Scottish Public Services Ombudsman.

He was appointed chair of the Scottish Legal Complaints Commission from 1 January 2018 to 31 January 2022.

== Honours ==
He was appointed Commander of the Most Excellent Order of the British Empire (CBE) in the 2018 New Year Honours.

Trade union offices
Preceded by John D. Pollock	General Secretary of the Educational Institute of Scotland; 1988–1995	Succeeded by Ronnie Smith
Government offices
Preceded by Alice Brown	Scottish Public Services Ombudsman; 2009—2017	Succeeded by Rosemary Agnew
