= Alex Russell =

Alex Russell may refer to:

- Alex Russell (actor) (born 1987), Australian actor
- Alex Russell (footballer, born 1973), English footballer
- Alex Russell (footballer, born 1944), (1944–2012), English footballer for Southport FC
- Alex Russell (footballer, born 1923) (1923–2014), Northern Irish footballer for Linfield FC
- Alex Russell (golfer) (1892–1961), Australian golfer and grazier
- Alex Russell (cricketer) (born 2002), English cricketer for Northamptonshire CCC

== See also ==
- Alexander Russell (disambiguation)
