= Falkirk High School =

High school in Falkirk, Scotland

Coordinates: 55.997°N 3.805°W

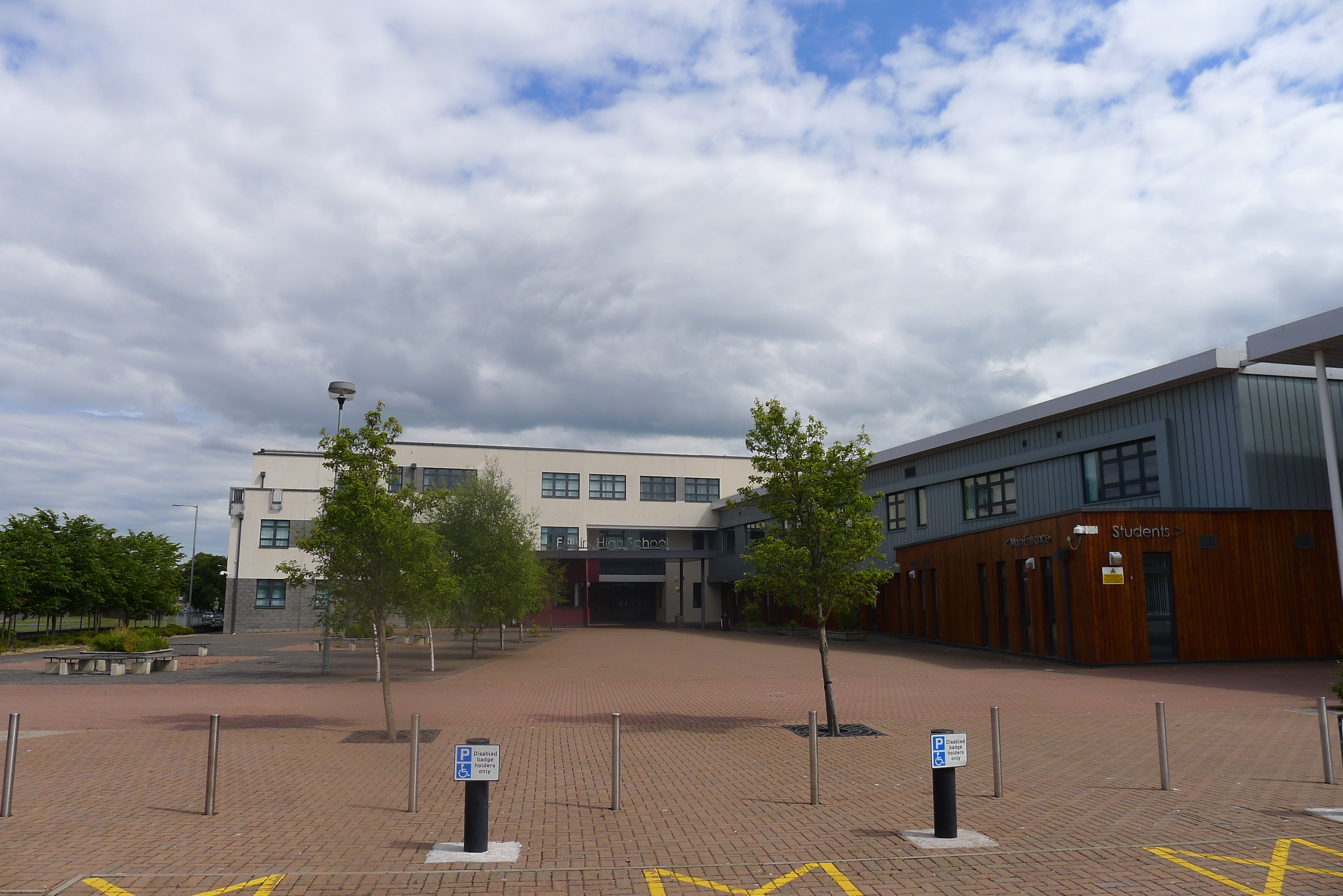
- Falkirk, Stirlingshire; Scotland

Information
- Type: Secondary
- Motto: Invicem Servite (Serve one another)
- Head teacher: Stuart Kelly
- Teaching staff: 102
- Enrollment: 1,200
- Color: maroon/white
- Athletics: gymnasium, swimming pool, dance/fitness suite and rugby/football pitch
- Website: http://www.falkirk.falkirk.sch.uk/

Falkirk High School is a high school located in Falkirk, Stirlingshire that was founded in 1886.

It is a non-denominational six-year fully comprehensive school, situated approximately one mile from the centre of the town. It serves a widespread catchment area and has eight associated primary schools: Bainsford, Bantaskin, Carmuirs, Comely Park, Easter Carmuirs, Langlees, Limerigg and Slamannan Primary Schools.

There are four houses – Campbell (Red), Mackay (Blue), Cameron (Green) and Robertson (Yellow), which are named after the first four rectors of the school.

== Roll ==
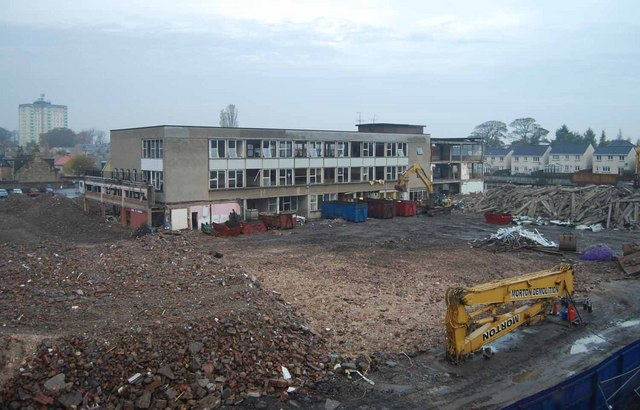
The school's former buildings during demolition in 2009. The school moved to these utilitarian 1960s buildings from its Victorian buildings in Rennie Street in 1963.

- 2004/2005 1153
- 2010/2011 1058

== Notable former teachers ==
- James Martin, Scottish Public Services Ombudsman since 2009 (taught from 1975 to 1979)
- Alexander Durie Russell FRSE (d.1955) maths teacher at Falkirk

== Notable alumni ==
- Craigie Aitchison, Lord Aitchison, Labour MP from 1929 to 1933 for Kilmarnock
- novelist Alan 'Alvin' Bissett
- Dame Elizabeth Blackadder, Painter and Limner
- Rev Dr John Urquhart Cameron, athlete, theologian, journalist
- Prof George Stuart Gordon, Vice-Chancellor of the University of Oxford from 1938 to 1941, President from 1928 to 1942 of Magdalen College, Oxford, and Professor of English at the University of Leeds
- Ian Harley, chief executive officer, Abbey National Bank from 1998 to 2002
- David Marshall, Labour MP from 2005 to 2008 for Glasgow East, and from 1979 to 2005 for Glasgow Shettleston
- Prof Gordon Marshall CBE, Vice-Chancellor from 2003 to 2011 of the University of Reading, and chairman since 2007 of the Higher Education Statistics Agency
- Donald Shaw Ramsay, was a Scottish bagpiper. Qualified as a pipe major in the British Army, he led the Edinburgh City Police Pipe Band to victory at the World Championships twice and was also leader of the all-star Invergordon Distillery Pipe Band during its four years of existence.
