= Death of Annie Börjesson =

2005 death of a Swedish woman in Scotland

Annie Kristina Börjesson was a Swedish woman whose body was found on Prestwick Beach, South Ayrshire, Scotland, on 4 December 2005. Scottish authorities concluded that her death was most likely caused by drowning and treated as a suicide.

Börjesson's family disputed the conclusion and campaigned for further investigation. Her death subsequently received attention from journalists, the Scottish Parliament, and television and podcast investigations.

== Background ==
Börjesson was a Swedish national who moved to Edinburgh, Scotland, in the autumn of 2004 to study English at a language school. She was multilingual, speaking Hungarian, Finnish, Spanish and some French in addition to Swedish and English. She was also a musician, singing and playing bass guitar in a band that performed in several European countries.

In February 2005, Börjesson received a scholarship to work at the Scotch Whisky Heritage Centre in Edinburgh. The placement ended in August, after which she returned to Sweden. She returned to Edinburgh in late October 2005 and renewed her tenancy at Linton Court Apartments while searching for permanent employment, particularly in the hotel industry.

Outside work, Börjesson regularly walked and swam and attended rugby matches in Edinburgh.

== Final known movements ==
On 3 December 2005, Börjesson left her accommodation in Edinburgh and travelled to Glasgow Prestwick Airport, where she intended to travel to Sweden.

CCTV recorded Börjesson leaving Prestwick International railway station and shortly afterwards entering the airport terminal. She remained inside for less than five minutes before leaving without checking in for the evening flight to Sweden.

The Scottish Review later reported that Börjesson had made two unsuccessful attempts to withdraw cash at Glasgow Central station earlier that afternoon and placed her arrival at Prestwick Airport at approximately 3:15 pm. The publication also reported that CCTV showed her briefly leaving the terminal towards the airport car park before returning and leaving the airport.

Börjesson's movements after leaving the airport are uncertain. The Scottish Review reported that police identified a person recorded on CCTV in Station Road, Prestwick, at approximately 4:05 pm as Börjesson, although the quality of the footage and the identification were subsequently questioned.

== Discovery of the body ==
On the morning of 4 December 2005, Börjesson's body was discovered by a dog walker on Prestwick beach, less than 24 hours after she had been recorded at the nearby airport.

She was found lying face down and fully clothed. A bag found beside her body contained her passport, wallet, clothing and books belonging to a Swedish library.

== Investigation ==
=== Initial investigation and post-mortem ===
Police cordoned off the area of Prestwick beach where Börjesson's body was found and began an investigation into her death. On 7 December 2005, the Ayrshire Post reported that police considered there to be "no suspicious circumstances" surrounding the death.

A post-mortem examination subsequently concluded that Börjesson had died from drowning. According to a copy of the report later obtained by the Scottish Review, her lungs were congested and her airways contained frothy material. The examination also recorded bruising to her right temple, abrasions to her left arm and two contused areas on her right arm. Police considered the minor injuries to be consistent with contact with rough objects in the water.

Toxicological testing was later carried out at the University of Glasgow. The Scottish Review reported that 19 mg of alcohol per 100 ml of blood was detected and that no drugs were found in the samples tested.

=== Conclusion of the investigation ===
Scottish authorities concluded that Börjesson had died by suicide by drowning. In 2007, amid calls from her family for the case to be reconsidered, the Crown Office stated that there had been a full investigation into the death and that there was no evidence of a crime.

In November 2008, BBC News reported that Strathclyde Police had concluded that Börjesson had taken her own life, while noting that her family disputed the conclusion and believed that her death could have involved a criminal act.

No fatal accident inquiry was held into Börjesson's death.

=== Later review and scrutiny ===
The investigation was subsequently reviewed by Police Scotland. In 2019, Detective Superintendent Paul Livingstone of its Specialist Crime Division said that the case had been "fully investigated at the time" and had subsequently been subject to review. Police Scotland maintained that deaths occurring outdoors in unexplained circumstances would be treated as potential crime scenes so that appropriate forensic procedures could be followed.

As part of a 2019 Sky News investigation, Home Office pathologist Stuart Hamilton reviewed material from the original post-mortem. Hamilton questioned aspects of the forensic recovery of Börjesson's body, noting that her hands had been bagged but that some other procedures ordinarily associated with forensic recovery did not appear to have been carried out. Police Scotland continued to maintain that there was no evidence indicating criminality in Börjesson's death.

In March 2020, a request was made under the Freedom of Information (Scotland) Act 2002 for a full copy of Police Scotland's investigation report. Police Scotland refused the request on the grounds that the material had been gathered for the purpose of reporting to the procurator fiscal concerning the cause of a person's death. The Scottish Information Commissioner upheld the refusal in December 2020, concluding that the information was exempt from disclosure under section 34(2)(b)(ii) of the Act.

== Family campaign for further investigation ==
Börjesson's family rejected the conclusion that she had died by suicide and began campaigning for further investigation into the circumstances of her death. Her mother, Guje Börjesson, repeatedly contacted the police, the Crown Office and Procurator Fiscal Service and Scottish politicians.

In June 2008, Börjesson and Annie's friend Maria Jansson visited Bute House in Edinburgh intending to deliver a letter to First Minister Alex Salmond. Salmond met them for more than 30 minutes, during which Börjesson asked for a fatal accident inquiry into her daughter's death. The Crown Office maintained that the death had been subject to a detailed investigation, that there was no evidence that a crime had occurred, and that any new information would be considered.

Börjesson continued to seek an inquiry. In December 2009, she travelled to Edinburgh to appeal directly to Lord Advocate Elish Angiolini, asking whether her daughter's death could be reconsidered and again requesting a fatal accident inquiry. The Crown Office responded that the death had been thoroughly investigated and that no suspicious circumstances had been identified, while stating that any new credible and reliable evidence would be considered.

In 2010, Börjesson submitted petition PE1332 to the Scottish Parliament. Rather than concerning only her daughter's case, the petition called for the Crown Office's specialist deaths unit to be able to examine retrospective and current cases of suspicious death where bereaved families could demonstrate reasonable grounds for concern, and for an independent review mechanism involving families. During consideration of the petition, the committee was told that it had received more than 3,000 supporting signatures from 57 countries.

The family continued to campaign for further examination of the case in subsequent years. In 2020, Guje Börjesson told Sky News that the family still wanted a fatal accident inquiry and sought access to previously unreleased material, including post-mortem photographs, for examination by an independent pathologist.

== Questions surrounding the death ==
Börjesson's family questioned a number of aspects of the official account of her death, including injuries observed after her body was repatriated to Sweden, the handling of forensic evidence, missing personal belongings and gaps in the reconstruction of her final movements. Scottish authorities have continued to maintain that the death was fully investigated and that there is no evidence of criminality.

=== Injuries and condition of the body ===
The post-mortem examination recorded several relatively minor injuries, including bruising to Börjesson's right temple, abrasions to her left arm and two contused areas on her right arm. Police considered these injuries consistent with contact with rough objects in the water.

After Börjesson's body was prepared for repatriation, however, funeral staff raised concerns about additional markings on the body which had not been described in the post-mortem report. The Scottish Review later reported that undertakers in Sweden observed extensive bruising to Börjesson's right arm and side and behind her right ear after the body arrived in Sweden. Her family argued that these injuries had not been adequately accounted for.

The condition of Börjesson's hair also became a point of dispute. Börjesson had worn her hair approximately waist-length, but when her body arrived in Sweden much of it had been cut. In 2007, the Sunday Mail reported that the Crown Office said the hair had been cut by funeral staff while preparing the body for repatriation because it had become matted with debris. Börjesson's family questioned whether this explanation accounted for the amount of hair that appeared to have been removed.

=== Personal belongings ===
Börjesson was recorded on airport CCTV wearing a red-and-white fleece beneath her jacket on the afternoon before her death. Her family subsequently stated that the fleece was not recovered with her body or belongings. In 2008, her friend Maria Jansson cited the missing fleece as one of the reasons the family believed that the circumstances of Börjesson's death required further investigation.

The family also reported that a personal organiser which Börjesson regularly carried, a Filofax, was never recovered. In 2009, Guje Börjesson publicly identified both the fleece and the Filofax among the unanswered questions surrounding her daughter's death. The Scottish Review later reported that the Filofax was not among the belongings recovered from the beach and was not found in Börjesson's accommodation.

=== Tissue sample analysis ===
Following Börjesson's death, tissue samples were examined by the Swedish National Board of Forensic Medicine. According to the Scottish Review, analysis of bone marrow detected the diatom Navicula lanceolata. The publication reported that specialists subsequently consulted by Börjesson's family considered the species to be primarily associated with freshwater and questioned whether its presence could demonstrate that Börjesson had drowned in the seawater at Prestwick.

The family sought further testing of retained tissue samples in an attempt to clarify the significance of the finding. The Scottish Review reported that an expert offered to conduct additional analysis, but that the requested testing was not carried out. The presence of the diatom did not itself establish an alternative cause of death, and the official conclusion remained drowning.

=== Reconstruction of her final movements ===
Questions were also raised over Börjesson's movements after she left Prestwick Airport. Police treated CCTV footage recorded in Station Road, Prestwick, at approximately 4:05 pm as showing Börjesson and relied on a witness account of a person standing near the water's edge at approximately 4:30 pm.

The Scottish Review later questioned both identifications. A retired police officer shown the Station Road images by the publication said that their quality was too poor for a reliable identification. The publication also reported that one of the witnesses who had seen the figure on the beach later told Börjesson's family that the person had been too far away for him to determine whether the individual was male or female.

Börjesson's family argued that there remained a substantial gap between her departure from Prestwick Airport and the discovery of her body the following morning. The Crown Office and Police Scotland have maintained that the circumstances of her death were thoroughly investigated and that no evidence of criminality has been identified.

== Rendition-flight theory ==
A theory subsequently developed that Börjesson's death might have been connected to alleged extraordinary rendition activity involving Glasgow Prestwick Airport. In the months before her death, the use of British airports by aircraft associated with the Central Intelligence Agency had received significant media attention. In September 2005, The Guardian reported that CIA-linked aircraft had used Prestwick more than 75 times since 2001, although it was not established that detainees had been aboard the aircraft while they were in the United Kingdom.

The proposed connection to Börjesson centred partly on the similarity between her full name, Annie Kristina Börjesson, and that of the American journalist Kristina Borjesson. The Scottish Review reported in 2013 that Börjesson's friend Maria Jansson had raised the similarity while investigating the circumstances of her death, at a time when it was believed that the journalist had been investigating rendition flights through Prestwick. In 2014, the Scottish Mail on Sunday subsequently published an article associating Börjesson's death with alleged CIA rendition activity at the airport.

The theory included speculation that Börjesson might have been mistaken for the American journalist or that she might inadvertently have encountered information relating to CIA activity at Prestwick. Sky News examined the theory in its 2019 podcast series What Happened to Annie?, including an episode titled The CIA and Prestwick.

Börjesson's mother, Guje Börjesson, has not endorsed the theory as an explanation for her daughter's death. In 2019, she told the Swedish newspaper Aftonbladet that she had investigated the possibility but had found nothing to substantiate it. Sky News similarly stated in 2020 that no evidence had emerged linking Börjesson's death to the alleged rendition flights.

== Access to records and freedom of information requests ==
Journalists and Börjesson's family have made a number of attempts to obtain official records relating to her death from authorities in Scotland and Sweden.

In 2019, Sky News requested archived correspondence held by the Swedish Ministry for Foreign Affairs concerning communications between Swedish and Scottish authorities following Börjesson's death. The ministry subsequently released a number of previously unseen documents, but portions of the records were redacted. The ministry stated that the withheld information was classified under Chapter 15, section 1 of Sweden's Public Access to Information and Secrecy Act because it concerned relations with a foreign state or foreign authority and its disclosure could damage Sweden's international relations or otherwise harm national interests.

Among the material released was correspondence indicating that Swedish embassy officials had been informed that suicide was suspected shortly after Börjesson's death. Sky News noted that one such document was recorded the day after her body was discovered, before the post-mortem examination had taken place. Börjesson's mother subsequently appealed for the remaining Swedish records to be disclosed.

Börjesson's parents also made requests under freedom of information legislation for copies of her post-mortem photographs. By December 2020, Sky News reported that two such requests had been refused. The authorities cited the potential distress that disclosure could cause the family and stated that release of the photographs was not considered to be in the public interest. The family said that they wanted the photographs to be examined by an independent pathologist.

Separately, on 10 March 2020, a request was made to Police Scotland under the Freedom of Information (Scotland) Act 2002 for a full copy of the report into the investigation of Börjesson's death. Police Scotland refused the request, citing section 34(2)(b)(ii) of the Act, which exempts information held for the purpose of an investigation leading to a report to the procurator fiscal concerning the cause of a person's death. It also initially cited section 39(1), concerning information whose disclosure could endanger the physical or mental health or safety of an individual.

Following an internal review, Police Scotland upheld the refusal, arguing in part that disclosure could prejudice any future review or investigation if new evidence emerged. The applicant appealed to the Scottish Information Commissioner, who examined the withheld material and in December 2020 ruled that Police Scotland was entitled to withhold it under section 34(2)(b)(ii). The Commissioner acknowledged a public interest in understanding how Police Scotland had investigated the death, but concluded that this did not outweigh the public interest in maintaining the exemption.

== Media coverage ==
In December 2013, the Scottish Review published The mysterious life and death of Annie Borjesson, a special investigation by journalist Kenneth Roy. The investigation examined the original police inquiry, post-mortem findings, CCTV evidence and witness accounts, and argued that the circumstances of Börjesson's death warranted further investigation. The publication also included a personal account by Börjesson's friend Maria Jansson.

In December 2019, Sky News released What Happened to Annie?, a six-part investigative podcast produced by Robert Mulhern as part of its StoryCast series. The series examined the evidence surrounding Börjesson's death, the family's criticism of the investigation, the official case for suicide and speculation concerning CIA-associated flights through Prestwick Airport. Police Scotland responded to the programme by maintaining that the death had been fully investigated and subsequently reviewed.

What Happened to Annie? subsequently won the award for best audio investigation at the 2020 Association for International Broadcasting Awards and gold for best serialised podcast at the 2020 New York Festivals Radio Awards.

In July 2023, BBC Scotland and BBC Three broadcast the four-part documentary series Body on the Beach: What Happened to Annie?. Presented by Scottish journalist Hazel Martin and produced by Rogan Scotland, the series revisited Börjesson's final movements, the forensic evidence, the rendition-flight theory and other possible explanations for her death. The documentary consisted of four episodes, titled The Body, The Journey, The Beach and The Suspect.

== See also ==
- List of unsolved deaths
