= Constitution of Scotland =

Constitution of Scotland may refer to:

- Scotland Act 1998, the framework of devolution to Scotland
- "A Constitution for a Free Scotland", a document published by the Scottish National Party in 2002
