= Kevin Dunion =

Kevin Dunion OBE
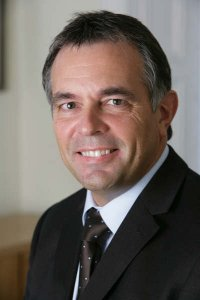

Lord Rector of the University of St Andrews
- In office November 2008 – October 2011
- Preceded by: Simon Pepper
- Succeeded by: Alistair Moffat

Personal details
- Born: 20 December 1955 (age 70) Bridge of Allan, Stirling, Scotland
- Education: University of St Andrews (MA); University of Edinburgh (MSc)

Kevin Harry Dunion OBE (born 20 December 1955) is the Convener of the Standards Commission for Scotland and was the first Scottish Information Commissioner 2003−2012. He is an Honorary Professor in the University of Dundee School of Law and a member of the Scottish Legal Complaints Commission. He was formerly Rector of the University of St Andrews 2008−11.

== Early life ==
Dunion was born in Bridge of Allan. His father Harry became a college lecturer and the family moved to Alloa and then Glenrothes. He attended St Andrew's High School in Kirkcaldy. He was educated at the University of St Andrews (MA (Hons) Modern History 1978) and at the University of Edinburgh (MSc (Dist) African Studies 1991).

== Career ==
Dunion spent periods in the civil service and university administration. He was Editor of the pro-devolution magazine Radical Scotland. He joined Oxfam as Campaigns Manager and then took up the post of Chief Executive of Friends of the Earth Scotland. From 1996 to 2000 he also served as Chairman of Friends of the Earth International, heading delegations to the United Nations and European Commission. He was Chair of Scottish Environment Link and served on the Board of Scottish Natural Heritage.

Dunion was for many years a notable proponent for freedom of information, and gave evidence to the Justice Committee scrutinising the passage of the Bill through the Scottish Parliament. He wrote the book Troublemakers – The Struggle For Environmental Justice In Scotland.

=== Information Commissioner ===
Dunion was appointed as the first Scottish Information Commissioner in February 2003. He was reappointed in 2008. Towards the end of his second term he proposed extra powers that he thought that the next Commissioner would need. He left office on 23 February 2012 after two terms - a total of nine years in office, during which time he handled some 1,500 cases.

=== Academic bodies and other roles ===
He was elected Lord Rector of the University of St Andrews in October 2008. He was installed on 3 March 2009. His term ran until 2011.

In 2012 Dunion was appointed Honorary Professor in the University of Dundee School of Law. He is executive director of their Freedom of Information Centre. In 2012 he was appointed by the President of the World Bank as a member of the bank's Access to Information Appeals Board.

In April 2013 he was appointed as a non-lawyer member of the Scottish Legal Complaints Commission.

=== Standards Commission ===
He became a member of the Standards Commission for Scotland on 1 September 2015. In November 2016 it was announced that he would become the Convener of the Commission, taking up the position on 1 February 2017.

== Awards and honours ==
In 2000 he was awarded an OBE for his work with Friends of the Earth.

In 2011 he was awarded an honorary degree, LLD, by the University of St Andrews.

== Personal life ==
Dunion is married to Linda Malloch, who was formerly married to Iain Gray, the former leader of the Labour Group in the Scottish Parliament.

Government offices
New office	Scottish Information Commissioner; 2003 — 2012	Succeeded by Rosemary Agnew
Academic offices
Preceded by Simon Pepper	Rector of the University of St Andrews; 2008—2011	Succeeded by Alistair Moffat
