= 2005–06 Bristol City F.C. season =

Bristol City
2005–06 season
- Chairman: Steve Lansdown
- Manager: Brian Tinnion (Until September 2005), Gary Johnson (From September 2005)
- Stadium: Ashton Gate
- League One: 9th
- FA Cup: First round
- League Cup: First round
- Football League Trophy: Southern Area First Round
- Top goalscorer: League: Steve Brooker (16); All: Steve Brooker (16)

The 2005–06 season was Bristol City Football Club's 108th season in English football, and their seventh consecutive season in the third tier, now known as League One. Brian Tinnion was sacked in September after a 7–1 defeat to Swansea City. Gary Johnson was appointed as his replacement.

The club's leading goalscorer was Steve Brooker, with 16 goals in all competitions.

== Final league table ==
Pos	Team	Pld	W	D	L	GF	GA	GD	Pts
7	Nottingham Forest	46	19	12	15	67	52	+15	69
8	Doncaster Rovers	46	20	9	17	55	51	+4	69
9	Bristol City	46	18	11	17	66	62	+4	65
10	Oldham Athletic	46	18	11	17	58	60	−2	65
11	Bradford City	46	14	19	13	51	49	+2	61

Rules for classification: 1) Points; 2) Goal difference; 3) Goals scored

== Results ==
Bristol City's score comes first

=== Legend ===
Win	Draw	Loss

=== Football League Second Division ===
Date	Opponent	Venue	Result	Attendance	Scorers
6 August 2005	Doncaster Rovers	H	0–0	15,481	
9 August 2005	Huddersfield Town	A	0–1	11,138	
13 August 2005	AFC Bournemouth	A	0–2	6,544	
20 August 2005	Port Vale	H	4–2	11,120	Brooker (2), Stewart, Murray
27 August 2005	Milton Keynes Dons	H	2–2	10,011	Brooker, Heywood
3 September 2005	Colchester United	H	0–0	10,180	
10 September 2005	Swansea City	A	1–7	13,662	Cotterill
17 September 2005	Blackpool	H	1–1	9,576	Cotterill
20 September 2005	Nottingham Forest	A	1–3	16,666	Gillespie
24 September 2005	Brentford	A	3–2	6,413	Stewart, Wilkshire, Brooker
27 September 2005	Barnsley	H	3–0	10,771	Stewart (2), Brooker
1 October 2005	Hartlepool United	H	0–1	11,365	
15 October 2005	Tranmere Rovers	H	1–0	10,495	Wilkshire
22 October 2005	Oldham Athletic	A	3–4	5,456	Brown, Quinn, Murray
26 October 2005	Chesterfield	A	0–3	5,027	
29 October 2005	Southend United	H	0–3	10,625	
11 November 2005	Swindon Town	A	1–2	7,572	Murray (pen)
19 November 2005	Chesterfield	H	2–4	9,752	Wilkshire, Cotterill
26 November 2005	Doncaster Rovers	A	0–2	7,876	
6 December 2005	Bradford City	H	0–1	9,103	
10 December 2005	Huddersfield Town	H	2–0	9,949	Murray, Cotterill
17 December 2005	Port Vale	A	1–0	4,214	Brooker
26 December 2005	Gillingham	A	1–1	7,786	Murray
28 December 2005	Rotherham United	H	3–1	12,510	Brooker (2), Murray
31 December 2005	Yeovil Town	A	1–1	9,178	Heywood
2 January 2006	Walsall	H	3–0	12,652	Murray (2), Wilkshire
14 January 2006	Scunthorpe United	H	1–1	11,692	Savage
17 January 2006	Colchester United	A	2–3	4,022	Murray, Stewart
21 January 2006	Blackpool	A	1–1	4,842	Brooker
28 January 2006	Swansea City	H	1–0	12,859	Carey
4 February 2006	Barnsley	A	0–2	8,092	
11 February 2006	Brentford	H	0–1	10,854	
14 February 2006	Scunthorpe United	A	2–0	3,786	Cotterill, Murray
18 February 2006	Bradford City	A	1–1	7,917	Brooker
25 February 2006	AFC Bournemouth	H	3–1	11,058	Brooker (2), McCammon
4 March 2006	Nottingham Forest	H	1–1	14,397	Russell
10 March 2006	Milton Keynes Dons	A	1–0	6,855	Brooker
18 March 2006	Gillingham	H	6–0	10,932	Carey (2), Brooker, Skuse, Wilkshire, McCammon
25 March 2006	Rotherham United	A	1–3	6,682	Skuse
1 April 2006	Yeovil Town	H	2–1	15,889	Orr, McCammon
8 April 2006	Walsall	A	3–0	5,402	Cotterill, Russell, Keogh
15 April 2006	Hartlepool United	A	2–1	5,039	Noble, Russell
17 April 2006	Oldham Athletic	H	2–1	12,779	Russell (pen), Brooker
22 April 2006	Tranmere Rovers	A	3–0	6,288	Brooker, McCammon, Woodman (pen)
29 April 2006	Swindon Town	H	1–1	15,632	Cotterill
6 May 2006	Southend United	A	0–1	11,387	

=== FA Cup ===
Round	Date	Opponent	Venue	Result	Attendance	Goalscorers
R1	5 November 2005	Notts County	H	0–2	4,221	

=== League Cup ===
Round	Date	Opponent	Venue	Result	Attendance	Goalscorers
R1	23 August 2005	Barnet	H	2–4	3,383	Golbourne, Bridges

=== Football League Trophy ===
Round	Date	Opponent	Venue	Result	Attendance	Goalscorers
Southern Section R1	18 October 2005	Barnet	A	2–3	1,031	Madjo, Murray
