= Rockstone Place Park =

Park in Southampton, England

Coordinates: 50°54′52″N 1°24′14″W

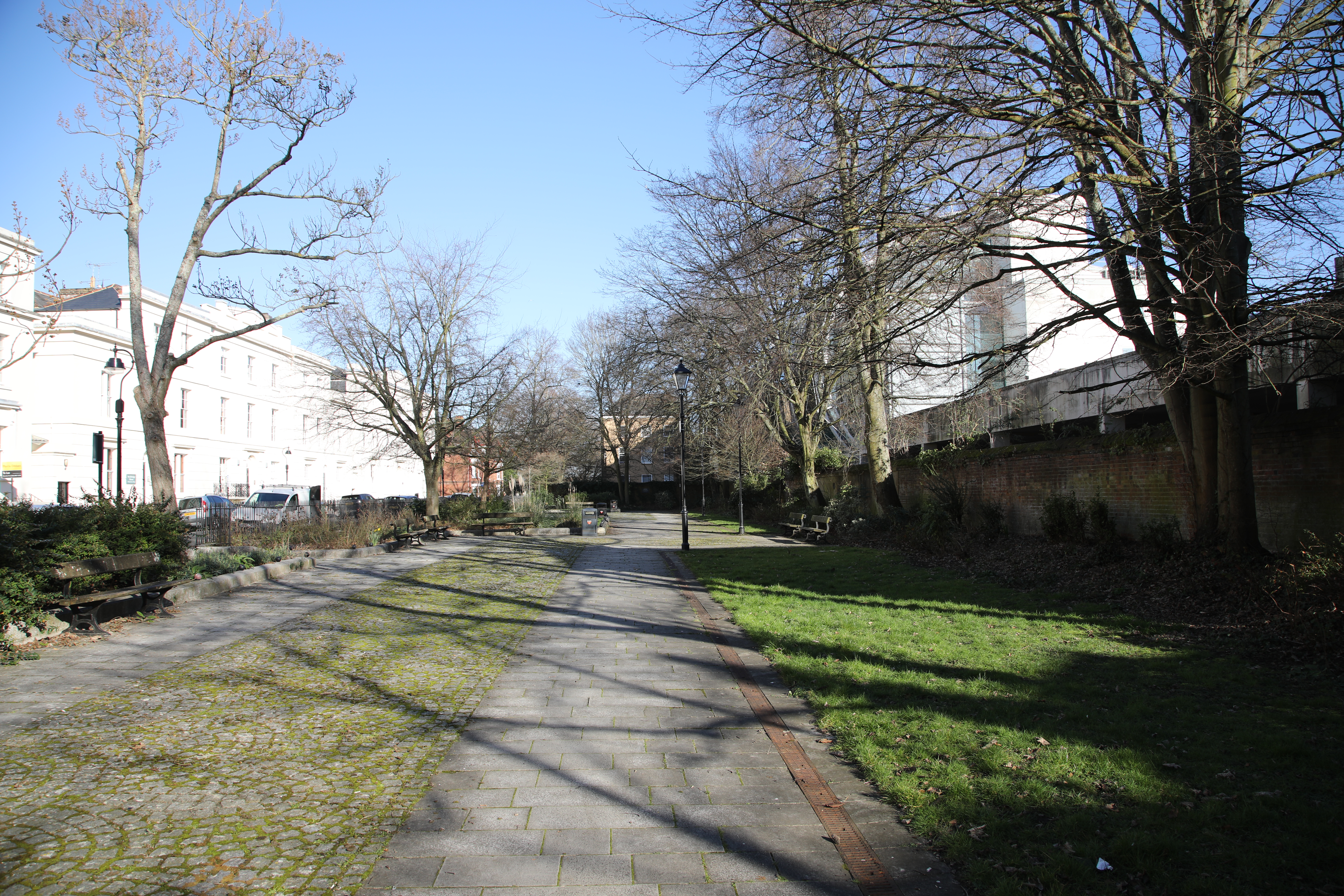
Rockstone Place Park

Rockstone Place Park or Little Mongers Park is a formal park in Southampton, United Kingdom. The park is next to the Southampton and New Forest Magistrates court building.

The park was originally constructed in the 19th century as a pleasure garden for the residents of a nearby housing development. In 1879 it was donated by Mrs Jane Wills, Miss Margaret Toomer and Miss Rebecca Toomer (the heirs of Edward Toomer who had constructed the housing development) to Southampton Council on condition that it remain a park forever. During World War II air raid shelters for ordnance survey staff were constructed in the park. After the war the park seems to have been largely abandoned before being converted into a car park in 1967. In the early 1980s the city of Southampton society and the Southampton Commons and Parks Protection Society became aware of the then car park's status and the terms of the initial gift (at least in the case of the Southampton Commons and Parks Protection Society via an anonymous letter). Attempts to raise the matter with the council resulted in no action and an appeal to the Local Government Ombudsman was rejected on the basis of the car park having been constructed before the Ombudsman came into existence and the council not having been given enough time to put things right. A second appeal to the Ombudsman in 1988 was accepted and the car park closed in 1990.
