= Alice Brown (ombudsman) =

Scottish academic

Alice Brown CBE FRSE FAcSS
- Born: 30 September 1946 (age 80); United Kingdom
- Title: Scottish Public Services Ombudsman

Academic background
- Education: Stevenson College
- Alma mater: University of Edinburgh

Alice Brown CBE FRSE FAcSS (born 30 September 1946) is a Scottish academic who is Emeritus Professor of Politics at the University of Edinburgh and Chancellor of the University of Abertay as of 2019. She was on the consultative steering group that advised on procedural aspects when the new Scottish Parliament was being set up. Her work included promoting the equal representation of women. She was the first Scottish Public Services Ombudsman, serving for two terms between 2002 and 2009, and was a member of the Administrative Justice and Tribunals Council 2008–2012. She was a member of the Committee on Standards in Public Life 1998–2003 and was elected as the first female General Secretary of the Royal Society of Edinburgh (RSE) 2011–2013. She was chair of the Scottish Funding Council since until her term of office ended on October 2, 2017.

== Early life ==
Brown left school at age 15 to work for a small insurance company, later returning to Stevenson College to get her Higher examinations through evening classes. In 1983, aged 37, she graduated from the University of Edinburgh with first-class honours in economics and politics.

== Academic career ==
In 1984 Brown took a temporary academic position at the University of Stirling, lecturing in economics. The following year she began working for the University of Edinburgh as a lecturer. With some funding from the Economic and Social Research Council she studied the work of Advisory, Conciliation and Arbitration Service (Acas) and went on to complete a PhD with her research. She was promoted to the head of the Politics department in 1995 and then was given a personal chair in Politics in 1997. She became Vice-Principal of the university in 1999.

== Scottish Parliament ==
After the Scottish electorate voted for a parliament in the devolution referendum in September 1997, a group was set up the following month that was tasked with drawing up detailed proposals for the standing orders to be used in the new Scottish Parliament. Brown was a member of this consultative steering group which reported to the Secretary of State for Scotland, Donald Dewar, in December 1998.

In 1998 Brown became involved with the governance of Scotland forum. The Institute of Governance at the University of Edinburgh was established in 1999 with Brown as a founding co-director. She was also part of Labour's panel to vet their prospective candidates for the 1999 Scottish Parliament election. Brown was known for being a champion of gender equality, and her work contributed towards a better gender balance in the 1st Scottish Parliament.

She was a member of the Committee on Standards in Public Life, first appointed on 1 November 1998 and reappointed on 1 November 2001.

== Ombudsman ==
In 2002, the parliament made preparations to replace a confusing system of several ombudsman offices which had been in operation since before the new parliament was set up. The changes were to allow a convenient way for members of the public to make complaints about a range of organisations providing public services. After some debate about whether the title of the person leading the service should be gender-neutral, the new legislation created the Scottish Public Services Ombudsman. In June 2002 a cross-party selection panel nominated Brown to lead this service, with Presiding Officer David Steel having the casting vote. Parliament then approved the nomination. Brown's appointment was then made by the Queen on 30 September 2002, taking up all her functions and powers from 23 October 2002. As the ombudsman, she was assisted by three part-time deputy ombudsmen and 38 members of staff. On taking up the ombudsman post she stepped down from her university position and from the Committee on Standards in Public Life. After serving a first term of five years, the Scottish Parliament approved the nomination for her to be reappointed in March 2007. Her second term of office lasted two years, and she was succeeded by Jim Martin who took office on 1 May 2009.

She was appointed to the Administrative Justice and Tribunals Council for a four-year period from 1 December 2008. She led the team that wrote Right First Time, a report that was published in June 2011, advising that the decision-making processes used by public bodies generally needed to improve.

== Other appointments ==
In 2011 she was elected the first female General Secretary of the RSE. a position she resigned in October 2013 on her appointment as chair of the Scottish Funding Council. In 2019 she was appointed the first female chancellor of Abertay University.

== Awards and honours ==
In 2002, she became an Academician, later known as a Fellow of the Academy of Social Sciences. She was elected a Fellow of the Royal Society of Edinburgh (FRSE) in 2002. The University of Edinburgh made her an Emeritus Professor in 2008. In 2009 she was chosen to receive a Special Recognition Award by the Political Studies Association.

She was appointed Commander of the Most Excellent Order of the British Empire (CBE) in the 2010 New Year Honours for public service.

She has been bestowed with honorary degrees from the University of Edinburgh in 2010, Edinburgh Napier University in 2009, the University of Stirling in 2004, Glasgow Caledonian University in 2012 and the University of Aberdeen in 2016.

Academic offices
Preceded by William Cullen	Chancellor of the University of Abertay Dundee; 2019–present	Incumbent
