= Free Scotland =

Free Scotland may refer to:

- A Constitution for a Free Scotland
- Radio Free Scotland
