= SSDT =

SSDT may refer to:

== Computing ==
- System Service Descriptor Table, an internal data structure within Microsoft Windows
- Secondary System Description Table, an ACPI table
- SQL Server Data Tools

== Other uses ==
- Scottish Six Days Trial, a motorcycle competition
- Scottish Solicitors' Discipline Tribunal
- Sekiro: Shadows Die Twice
