= Gordon Marshall (sociologist) =

British sociologist (born 1952)

Gordon Marshall CBE FBA
- Born: 20 June 1952 (age 74)
- Education: University of Stirling
- Occupation: Sociologist
- Employer: The Leverhulme Trust

Gordon Marshall CBE FBA (born 20 June 1952) is a British sociologist and former Director of the Leverhulme Trust in England.

== Education ==
Born in Falkirk, Gordon Marshall was educated at Falkirk High School, the University of Stirling (BA Sociology 1974) and Nuffield College, Oxford (DPhil 1978).

== Career ==
Prior to joining the Leverhulme Trust, Gordon Marshall was vice-chancellor of the University of Reading, 2003–2011. He oversaw major advances in its teaching and research profile and the merger with the former Henley Management College to form Henley Business School. His period of office was also characterised by significant investment in University facilities, including the Minghella Building for the performing arts, the replacement of many of the university's halls of residence, and a new building for the Henley Business School. During his term of office, there was some controversy over the closure, on economic grounds, of the departments of Physics and Health and Social Care.

Between 2007 and 2011 he was also Chairman of the Higher Education Statistics Agency, and from 2013 to 2017 was Chair of the UK Data Service/Digital Information Strategic Advisory Committee.

Previous to this, Marshall was the chief executive of the Economic and Social Research Council (ESRC), from 2000 to 2002. The increasing impact of the ESRC's work, and the regard in which it was held, became apparent at this time. Described as a team player who led quietly but with focus, it is no surprise that Marshall later insisted that any success under his direction was a collective effort and attributable to all staff at the council. However, under his leadership the ESRC achieved the highest proportionate increase in its income, and earned the highest increase of all the research councils in two successive spending reviews. This saw the budget rise from under £70 million to over £110 million; a growth of nearly one third of total income.

Like his predecessor Ron Amman, Marshall was a distinguished social science researcher, before being appointed to the ESRC. Prior appointments included a professorship in sociology at the University of Bath, lecturership and senior lecturership at the University of Essex, Morris Ginsberg Fellowship at the London School of Economics and Political Science, and Postdoctoral Research Fellowship at Nuffield College, Oxford. He has also been a visiting professor at several European universities.

== Research ==
Marshall has made important contributions to interdisciplinary and cross-national comparative work in the social sciences. His main fields of research include social exclusion, equality of opportunity, distributive justice and the culture of economic enterprise, and he has written widely on these topics. He played an instrumental role in the Government Review of social classifications, both as a consultant and as a member of the steering group to the study, which was run jointly by the ESRC and the Office for National Statistics and which resulted in major changes to official classifications.

Marshall's early research was focused on Max Weber and the origins of modern economies. His first book, based on his doctoral thesis, concerned Calvinism and the development of capitalism in seventeenth-century Scotland. In later publications he addressed the complexities of social mobility and social class which were central to the concerns of the so-called ‘Nuffield School’ of sociology. In his co-authored volume, Against the Odds? Social Class and Social Justice in Industrial Societies, published in 1997, Marshall and his colleagues took a cautious and nuanced view of the relationship between social class, social mobility and social justice through educational opportunities. Their research was rooted, in Nuffield style, in a range of social survey empirical data.

His single-authored volume Repositioning Class: Social Inequality in Industrial Societies, also published in 1997, brought together a number of his essays from the previous decade, in which he argues that public pronouncements about the death of social class were greatly exaggerated. As Marshall wrote in the preface to this volume, “Social class is as important to the understanding of late twentieth-century industrial societies as it was to their early capitalist counterparts and class analysis is probably now in a healthier state than at any previous time in its long sociological history”.

Marshall's main contribution to Nuffield sociology was his connection of concepts of social justice with social mobility. He argued persuasively that political intervention is required to prevent class inequalities from impeding the advance of social justice.

During the 1990s Marshall also played an important part in the creation of the department of sociology at Oxford University, in the teeth of some stiff resistance, especially from among the political scientists who wanted to subsume the subject under their discipline.

== Awards and honours ==
He was an Official Fellow of Nuffield College at the University of Oxford from 1993 until 1999. Elected a Fellow of the British Academy in 2000 and of the Royal Norwegian Society of Sciences and Letters in 2001 and awarded a CBE in 2003 for his services to economic and social science.

Marshall has been awarded honorary degrees by the Universities of Aberdeen, Exeter, Reading and Stirling.
