= John Urquhart Cameron =

- Born: 10 June 1943 Dundee, Scotland, United Kingdom
- Occupation: journalist, scientist and churchman
- Language: English
- Spouse: Jill Cameron, née Sjoberg (1970–present)

John Urquhart Cameron (born 1943) is an academic and social reformer and a former parish minister of the Church of Scotland. He met and married the Anglo-Swedish skier Jill Sjoberg when he was a marketing executive with GlaxoSmithKline in London and they have a daughter Clare and a son Alex.

== Biography ==
Cameron was born in Dundee, Scotland. He is the eldest son of Alexander Cameron, a miner who went up from the West-Central coalfields to the University of Glasgow to study divinity during the depression. His father, serving as an army padre throughout World War II, returned to the coalfields as the parish minister of Slamannan where he was for many years a Labour Party councillor in local government in Stirlingshire. His maternal grandfather, Hugh Urquhart, was a leading Scottish railway engineer in the early decades of the 20th century.

He was educated at Falkirk High School and at Pomona College in California, the University of St Andrews and the University of Edinburgh. He holds a PhD in both physics and theology.

During his time in California he attended lectures given at Caltech by the theoretical physicist Richard Feynman. The Nobel Laureate's third wife, Gwyneth Howarth, was a distant relative of Cameron and the two men became friends, remaining close until Feynman's death in 1989. Cameron and another friend and associate of Feynman, Freeman Dyson, later became critics of the global warming hypothesis popularized by Al Gore.

Cameron was an athlete and selected for the Scottish international athletics team while at school, and later gained one of the first American sports scholarships awarded to a Scottish runner. He played golf, playing for the University of St Andrews in the 1960s and the University of Edinburgh in the 1970s before becoming a member of The Royal and Ancient Golf Club of St Andrews.

Following his time with GlaxoSmithKline in London he entered the Church of Scotland ministry. He was parish minister of Broughty Ferry for 35 years during which time he also taught religious studies at the High School of Dundee. At other times during his career he lectured in physics and mathematics at Napier University, the University of Dundee and Abertay University.

His family includes journalist James Cameron who wrote articles for The Courier, The Scotsman, The Good Ski Guide, The Good Holiday Magazine and The Scottish Review, he was also a senior chaplain for many years in the Royal Naval Reserve and later padre to the Black Watch

He is known as a social reformer among the Scottish clergy and has collaborated with the Very Rev Professor Iain Torrance of Princeton University to address some of the most controversial topics of the day. He is an advocate and supporter of same-sex marriage, ordination of gay clergy, the right to physician assisted suicide, women's right to choose and the decriminalisation of narcotics.

He joined Torrance and Dr Jim Swire to campaign for the retrial of Abdelbaset al-Megrahi the Libyan convicted of the Lockerbie Bombing. His critical report of the scientific and forensic evidence presented at the trial in The Hague changed attitudes to Megrahi.
