= Larry Flanagan =

Scottish trade union leader

Larry Flanagan (born Scotland 1955) is a Scottish former trade union leader and politician.

Flanagan attended the University of Stirling before becoming a teacher at Blantyre High School. He also became active in the Militant Tendency and in the Labour Party. He was elected to Glasgow City Council, where he called for the party to oppose the Poll Tax with a campaign of non-payment. He hoped to stand in the 1988 Glasgow Govan by-election, but was not considered as a candidate due to his involvement with Militant.

Early in the 1990s, Flanagan was suspended from the Labour group on the council due to disagreements about strategy with relation to the Poll Tax. He instead focused on his teaching career, at Penilee High School in Glasgow and then Hillhead High School in Glasgow. He also became increasingly prominent in the Educational Institute of Scotland (EIS) trade union, being elected to its council and convening its education committee. In 2012, he was elected as the union's general secretary. He represented the union on the General Council of the Trades Union Congress, and the General Council of the Scottish Trades Union Congress. He retired as General Secretary of the EIS in 2022.

Trade union offices
Preceded by Ronnie Smith	General Secretary of the Educational Institute of Scotland; 2012-2022	Succeeded by Andrea Bradley
