= Scottish Legal Services Ombudsman =

The Scottish Legal Services Ombudsman was a non-departmental public body in Scotland appointed by the Scottish Ministers responsible for overseeing the internal complaints procedures of the Faculty of Advocates and the Law Society of Scotland but with considerable constraints on their investigatory remit. It was replaced by the Scottish Legal Complaints Commission in 2008

The legal profession in Scotland is essentially self-regulating with solicitors licensed by, members of, and responsible to the Law Society of Scotland, with Advocates having the same relationship with the Faculty of Advocates. The Ombudsman was theoretically independent from the legal professions and the Scottish Executive; (but see below) the Ombudsman's findings and recommendations were not reviewed by Scottish Ministers or the Scottish Executive.

All allegations of criminal activities of Scottish lawyers are handled by the Crown Office and Procurator Fiscal Service, the public prosecution service for Scotland headed by the Lord Advocate.

The organisation Scotland Against Crooked Lawyers did not believe the system provided by the Ombudsman gave sufficient independent scrutiny of the legal profession. The concerns however were held more broadly than this, with some observers fearing the Ombudsman had shown repeated bias in favour of the legal establishment when considering complaints.

== Decisions ==
The Ombudsman decided:

- if the professional body has given each complaint proper attention;
- if it has taken appropriate action on the basis of a fair and thorough examination of all the evidence;
- if it has acted reasonably, impartially and effectively.
