= Ronnie Smith (trade unionist) =

Scottish trade union leader

Ronald Smith (born 1951 or 1952) is a retired Scottish trade union leader.

Born in Shetland, Smith was educated at the University of Aberdeen, where he received a degree in Latin and Economic History. He became a teacher at Broxburn Academy, and joined the Educational Institute of Scotland (EIS). He gradually came to prominence in the union, and in 1988 was appointed as one of its full-time assistant secretaries. In the role, he became known for his work on pay, working conditions, and legal matters.

Smith was elected as general secretary of the EIS in 1995. While in the post, he negotiated the 2001 McCrone Agreement which led to pay increases and caps on working hours for teachers. He also served for five years as president of Education International Europe. He retired in 2012.

Trade union offices
Preceded by Jim Martin	General Secretary of the Educational Institute of Scotland; 1995-2012	Succeeded by Larry Flanagan
