= Simon Pepper =

Simon Pepper OBE FRSGS

Lord Rector of the University of St Andrews
- In office November 2005 – October 2008
- Preceded by: Sir Clement Freud
- Succeeded by: Kevin Dunion

Personal details
- Born: 27 September 1947 Worthing, West Sussex, England
- Died: 18 September 2018 (aged 70) Aberfeldy, Perthshire, Scotland
- Spouse: Morag Mackenzie
- Children: 5
- Parents: Richard Pepper (father); Patricia Pepper (née Mackenzie) (mother)
- Education: Radley College
- Alma mater: University of Aberdeen; University College London
- Occupation: Environmentalist

Simon Pepper OBE FRSGS (27 September 1947 – 18 September 2018) was director of the World Wildlife Fund (Scotland) from 1985 to 2005. He was also lord rector of the University of St Andrews between 2005 and 2008, having been inaugurated on 10 March, and was succeeded by Kevin Dunion.

== Early life ==
Pepper was born in Worthing, West Sussex. He was educated at Radley College in Oxfordshire and studied zoology at the University of Aberdeen. After working for the Food and Agriculture Organization of the United Nations in Chad, he returned to the United Kingdom in 1973 to study for a master's degree at University College London.

== Career ==
Pepper was a board member of the Deer and Forestry Commissions in Scotland, as well as acting as an advisor to Scottish Ministers on Sustainable Development as a member of the Cabinet Sub-Committee on Sustainable Scotland.

He was awarded the OBE in the Millennium Honours List for his services to Sustainable Development, having served as a member of the Secretary of State's Advisory Group on Sustainable Development from 1994 to 1998. Before joining WWF, Simon Pepper ran his own business in Scotland, providing holiday courses about cultural and natural heritage.

In 2005, Pepper saw off competition from Gordon Ramsay to be elected by students as the Rector of the University of St Andrews.

In 2011, Simon Pepper was appointed a member of the Heritage Lottery Fund's Committee for Scotland.

== Personal life ==
Simon Pepper died suddenly on 18 September 2018.

Academic offices
Preceded by Sir Clement Freud	Rector of the University of St Andrews; 2005—2008	Succeeded by Kevin Dunion
