= Rector of the University of St Andrews =

Elected office

- Incumbent; Arthur Bernhoff since 2026
- Member of: University Court
- Appointer: Elected by all the matriculated students of the University
- Term length: 3 years
- Constituting instrument: Universities (Scotland) Act 1858
- Formation: 1858 (in modern form)
- First holder: Sir Ralph Anstruther, 4th Bt.
- Website: st-andrews.ac.uk/about/governance/key-officials/rector/

The Lord Rector of the University of St Andrews is an elected position, usually also the president of the University Court of the University of St Andrews; the University Court is the supreme governing body of the university.

== Overview ==
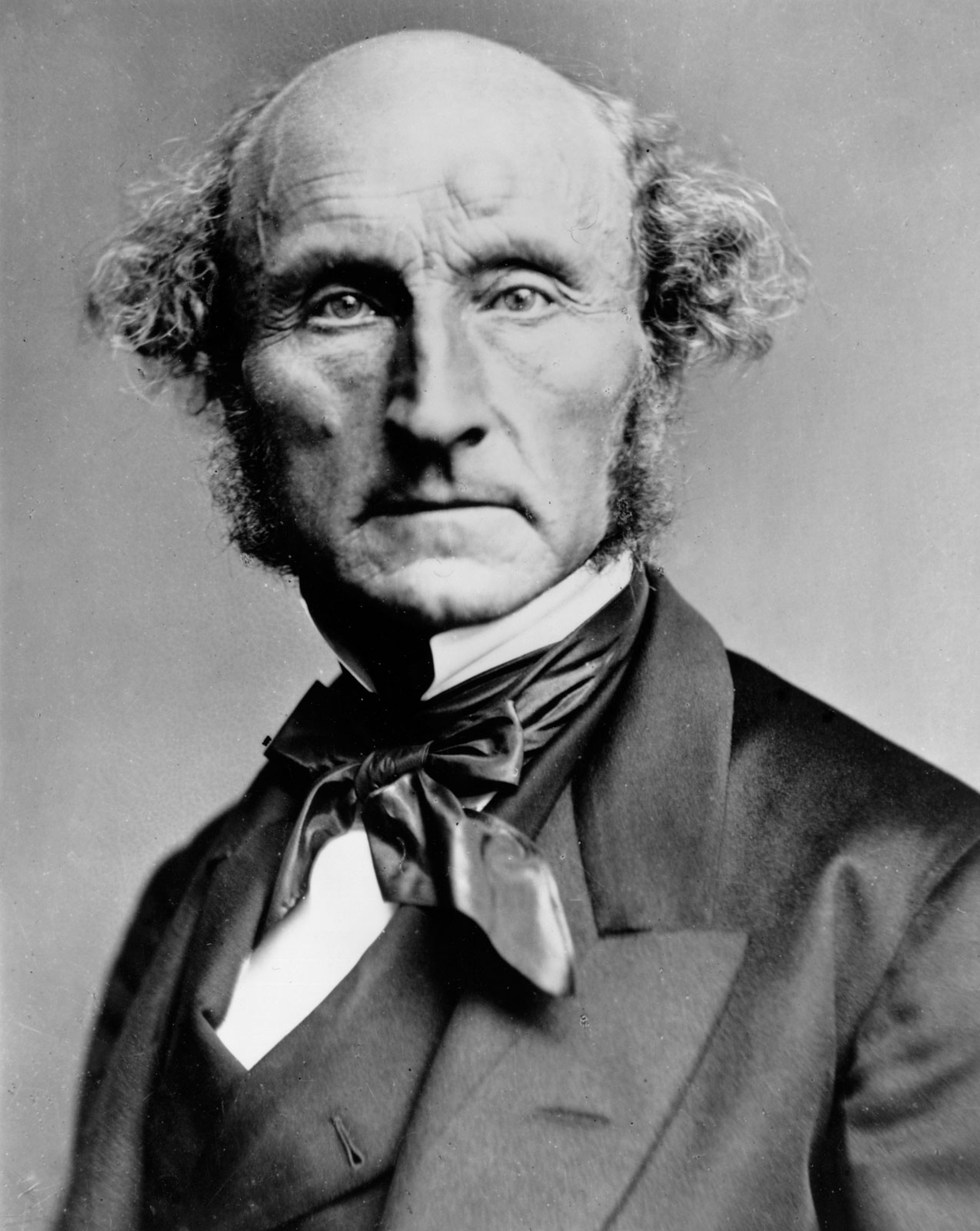
John Stuart Mill, former rector and Member of Parliament

The rector is elected every three years by the matriculated students of the university. The current office of rector, sometimes termed lord rector, was instituted by the Universities (Scotland) Act 1858, passed by the Parliament of the United Kingdom. The Universities (Scotland) Acts regulate the governance of the ancient universities of Scotland, and require the election of a rector for the universities of Aberdeen, Edinburgh, Glasgow, and St Andrews. The newer University of Dundee also elects a rector due to its historical ties to St Andrews, whereas other modern universities do not.

Since 1970 the rector has appointed a student as the rector's assessor, who is a full voting member of the University Court, and also serves as a member of the students' representative council.

== List of rectors ==
Rectors of the University of St Andrews
#	Name	Years served
1	Sir Ralph Anstruther, 4th Bt.	1859–1862
2	William Stirling-Maxwell, MP	1862–1865
3	John Stuart Mill	1865–1868
4	J.A. Froude	1868–1871
5	Charles Neaves, Lord Neaves	1872–1874
6	Dr. Arthur Penrhyn Stanley	1874–1877
7	Roundell Palmer, 1st Earl of Selborne	1877–1880
8	Sir Theodore Martin	1880–1883
9	Donald Mackay, 11th Lord Reay	1884–1886
10	A.J. Balfour	1886–1889
11	Frederick Hamilton-Temple-Blackwood, 1st Marquess of Dufferin and Ava	1889–1892
12	Lord Patrick Crichton-Stuart, The 3rd Marquess of Bute	1892–1898
13	James Stuart, MP	1898–1901
14	Andrew Carnegie	1901–1907
15	John Lubbock, 1st Baron Avebury	1907–1910
16	Archibald Primrose, 5th Earl of Rosebery	1910–1913
17	John Hamilton-Gordon, 1st Marquess of Aberdeen and Temair	1913–1916
18	Field Marshal Douglas Haig, 1st Earl Haig	1916–1919
19	Sir James M. Barrie	1919–1922
20	Rudyard Kipling	1922–1925
21	Fridtjof Nansen	1925–1928
22	Sir Wilfred Grenfell	1928–1931
23	Field Marshal Jan Smuts	1931–1934
24	Guglielmo Marconi, 1st Marquess of Marconi	1934–1937
25	Lord MacGregor Mitchell	1937–1938
26	Sir David Munro	1938–1946
27	Sir George Cunningham	1946–1949
28	David Cecil, 6th Marquess of Exeter	1949–1952
29	David Lindsay, 28th Earl of Crawford	1952–1955
30	David Maxwell Fyfe, 1st Earl of Kilmuir	1955–1958
31	Robert Boothby, Baron Boothby	1958–1961
32	C. P. Snow	1961–1964
33	Sir John Rothenstein	1964–1967
34	Sir Learie Nicholas Constantine (Baron Constantine from 1969)	1967–1970
35	John Cleese	1970–1973
36	Alan Coren	1973–1976
37	Frank Muir	1976–1979
38	Tim Brooke-Taylor	1979–1982
39	Katharine Whitehorn	1982–1985
40	Stanley Adams	1985–1988
41	Nicholas Parsons	1988–1991
42	Nicky Campbell	1991–1993
43	Donald Findlay	1993–1999
44	Andrew Neil	1999–2002
45	Sir Clement Freud	2002–2005
46	Simon Pepper	2005–2008
47	Kevin Dunion	2008–2011
48	Alistair Moffat	2011–2014
49	Catherine Stihler	2014–2017
50	Srđa Popović	2017–2020
51	Leyla Hussein	2020–2023
52	Stella Maris	2023–2026
53	Arthur Bernhoff	2026–Present

== See also ==
- Ancient university governance in Scotland
- Governance of the University of St Andrews
- Chancellor of the University of St Andrews
- Principal of the University of St Andrews
