= Administrative Justice and Tribunals Council =

UK non-departmental public body

The Administrative Justice and Tribunals Council (AJTC) was a non-departmental public body in the United Kingdom, responsible for supervising and regulating administrative justice and tribunals. It was created by the Tribunals, Courts and Enforcement Act 2007, and came into being on the 1 November 2007, under the chairmanship of Baron Newton of Braintree. It was abolished as of 19 August 2013 by the Conservative-Liberal Democrat Coalition Government under the Public Bodies Act 2011.

== Composition ==
The Council was composed of:

- The Parliamentary Commissioner for Administration; and
- Between ten and fifteen members who were appointed by the Lord Chancellor, the Scottish ministers and the Welsh Ministers.

There was a Scottish committee of the Council composed of:

- The Parliamentary Commissioner for Administration;
- The Scottish Public Services Ombudsman;
- Scottish members of the Council.

There was a Welsh committee of the Council composed of:

- The Parliamentary Commissioner for Administration;
- The Welsh Public Services Ombudsman;
- Welsh members of the Council.

== Functions of the Council ==
=== Administrative justice ===
The "administrative justice system” is the overall system by which decisions of an administrative or executive nature are made in relation to particular persons, including:

- Procedures for making such decisions;
- Law under which such decisions are made; and
- Systems for resolving disputes and airing grievances in relation to such decisions.

The Council was to:

- Keep the administrative justice system under review;
- Consider ways to make the system accessible, fair and efficient;
- Give advice on the development of the system to:
  - Lord Chancellor,
  - Scottish Ministers,
  - Welsh Ministers, and
  - Senior President of Tribunals;
- Refer proposals for changes in the system to those persons; and
- Make proposals for research into the system.

The Council could make reports on any of these issues it thinks appropriate.

=== Tribunals ===
The Council was to keep under review, and report on, the constitution and working of the listed tribunals (the tribunals under its supervision), in general and individually. It is also to report on any other matter relating to the listed tribunals or referred to it by the Lord Chancellor, the Scottish and Welsh ministers. The Council could scrutinise and comment on legislation relating to tribunals.

The listed tribunals will ultimately be the First-tier Tribunal and Upper Tribunal created under the 2007 Act but, during the transitional period 107 existing tribunals were transferred to the supervision of the Council on 1 November 2007.

=== Statutory inquiries ===
The Council was to keep under review, and report on, the constitution and working of statutory inquiries, any important matter that relates to statutory inquiries or which was referred to it.

== Programme of work ==
In planning its programme of work, the Council had to consider the work of:

- The Civil Justice Council;
- The Social Security Advisory Committee; and
- The Industrial Injuries Advisory Council.

The Council had to publish an annual report.
