= Alistair Moffat =

Scottish rugby union player, writer and journalist

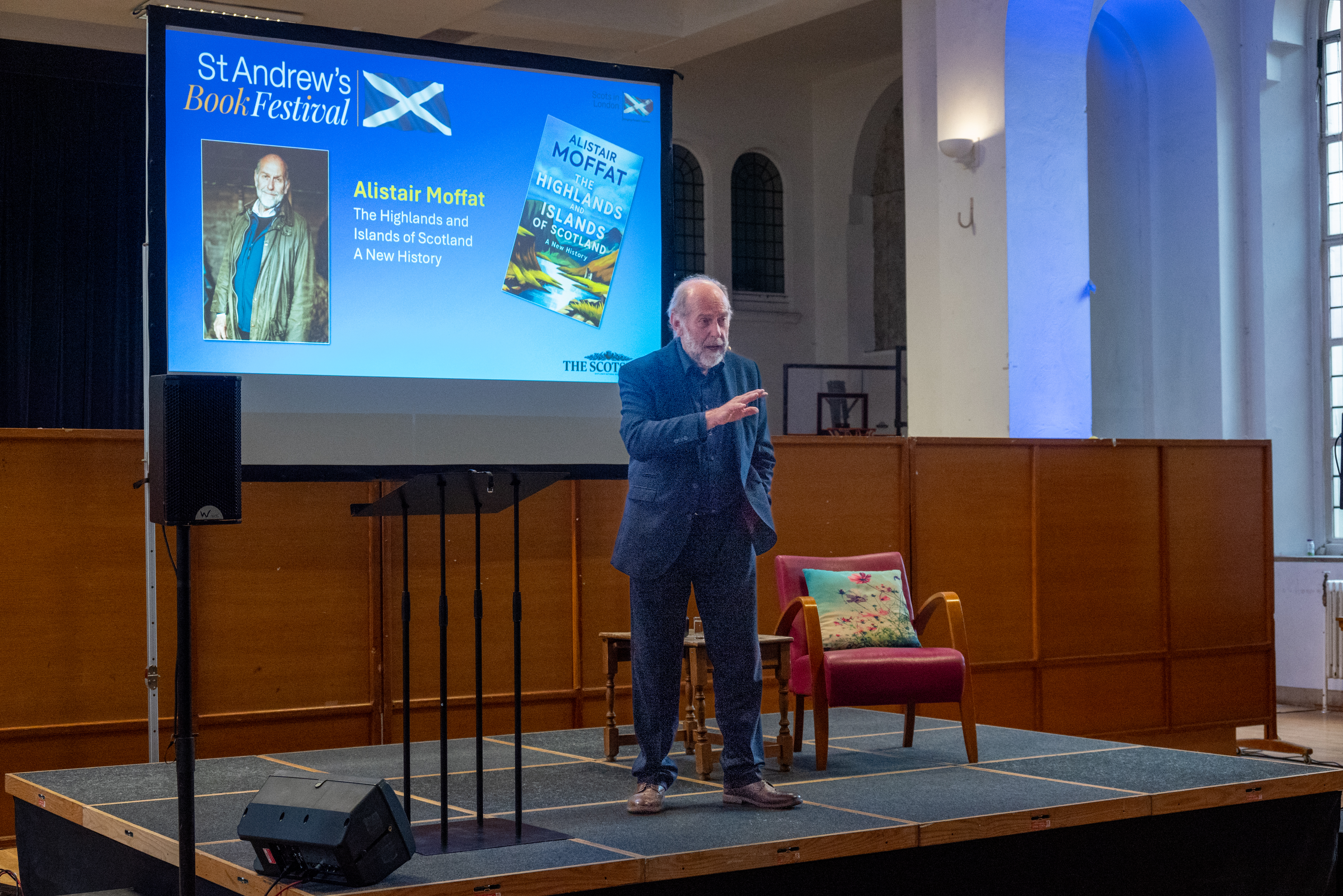
- Alistair Moffat speaks at the 2024 St Andrew's Book Festival

Lord Rector of the University of St Andrews
- In office October 2011 – October 2014
- Preceded by: Kevin Dunion
- Succeeded by: Catherine Stihler

Personal details
- Born: 16 June 1950 (age 76) Kelso, Scottish Borders, Scotland
- Education: University of St Andrews (MA); Warburg Institute, School of Advanced Study (MPhil)

Alistair Murray Moffat (born 16 June 1950) is a Scottish writer and journalist, former director of the Edinburgh Festival Fringe, and former Rector of the University of St Andrews.

== Education ==
Born at Kelso in the Scottish Borders, Moffat graduated from the University of St Andrews in 1972 with an honours degree in medieval history. He also attended the University of Edinburgh and the University of London, where he earned a Master of Philosophy degree in 1975.

Moffat was also active in student politics throughout his time at St Andrews, playing a leading role in the rectorial campaign of John Cleese, who went on to become one of St Andrews' best loved rectors.

At Edinburgh Moffat continued his involvement in student politics, campaigning with Gordon Brown, the second student elected rector of the University of Edinburgh. Moffat and Brown went on to campaign on a number of social and political issues including gay rights and the 1979 Edinburgh South by-election.

== Career ==
=== Edinburgh Festival Fringe ===
Moffat found early success after university, becoming Director of the Edinburgh Festival Fringe in 1976. Moffat's five-year tenure saw the festival grow into the largest arts festival in the world.

=== STV ===
Moffat left the Fringe in 1981 and joined STV, where he rose to become programme director, Chief Executive of Network Production and finally Chairman of STV. In 1989 he was appointed to the NSG, the group that controls UK wide scheduling for ITV. He left STV in 1999 to focus on writing.

=== Writing ===
During the 1970s and early 1980s Moffat wrote a number of papers focusing on education policy. His approach, recommending a renewed focus on primary education as the key to widening participation at secondary and higher levels, has since formed parts of the education manifestos of all three major parties in Britain.

Moffat's writing since 1999 has been focused mainly in the field of social history. Beginning with The Edinburgh Fringe (1978), he has written over forty books, including the bestselling Tyneside, The Reivers and The Wall (all of which have since been remade as television series):

- The Edinburgh Fringe (1978)
- Kelsae: History of Kelso from Earliest Times (1985)
- Remembering Charles Rennie Mackintosh (1989)
- Arthur and the Lost Kingdoms (1999)
- The Sea Kingdoms: The History of Celtic Britain and Ireland (2001)
- The Borders: A History of the Borders from Earliest Times (2002)
- Homing: A Memoir (2003)
- Before Scotland: The Story of Scotland Before History (2005)
- Tyneside: A History of Newcastle and Gateshead from Earliest Times (2005), co-authored with George Rosie
- East Lothian (2006)
- The Reivers: The Story of the Border Reivers (2007)
- The Wall: Rome's Greatest Frontier (2008)
- Tuscany: A History (2009)
- The Faded Map: The Lost Kingdoms of Scotland (2010)
- The Highland Clans (2010)
- The Scots: A Genetic Journey (2011)
- Britain's Last Frontier: A Journey Along the Highland Line (2012)
- The British: A Genetic Journey (2013)
- The Great Tapestry of Scotland: The Making of a Masterpiece (2013)
- Bannockburn: The Battle for a Nation (2014)
- Hawick: A History from Earliest Times (2014)
- Scotland: A History from Earliest Times (2016)
- The Hidden Ways: Scotland's Forgotten Roads (2017)
- To the Island of Tides: A Journey to Lindisfarne (2019)
- In Search of Angels: Travels to the Edge of the World (2020)
- The Secret History of Here: A Year in the Valley (2021)
- The Night Before Morning (2021)
- Islands of the Evening: Journeys to the Edge of the World (2022)
- War Paths: Walking in the Shadows of the Clans (2023)
- Scotland's Forgotten Past: A History of the Mislaid, Misplaced and Misunderstood (2023)
- Between Britain: Walking the History of England and Scotland (2024)
- The Highlands and Islands of Scotland: A New History (2024)
- Edinburgh: A New History (2024)

=== Career after STV ===
Since leaving STV in 1999, Moffat has served as Director of the Borders Book Festival and Lennoxlove Book Festival, both of which he also founded. He has also maintained his interest in education, serving as Director of "Book Nation", a Scottish national literacy initiative, working alongside Sir Robert Winston and Margaret Drabble to improve literacy in Scotland.

On 28 October 2011, Moffat was elected Rector of the University of St Andrews. He was appointed for a three-year term, his period of office spanning the university's 600th anniversary celebrations which ran from 2011 to 2013.

=== BritainsDNA controversy ===
Moffat was the chief executive of the company BritainsDNA, which offered genetic analyses of the mitochondrial DNA and Y chromosomal DNA of customers who were interested in their ancestry. Moffat's management and promotion of the company generated some controversy and criticism from some of the scientific community due to certain scientifically unfounded claims.

On the BBC Today Programme, Moffat made some incorrect statements, including that 97% of men surnamed Cohen share a common genetic marker. Geneticists at University College London including David Balding and Mark G. Thomas criticised these claims as having no scientific basis and being little more than genetic astrology. Balding and Thomas wrote a series of emails to the chief scientist at BritainsDNA, encouraging him to retract these inaccuracies. This was met by a legal threat from Moffat at their use of the term "fraudulent". The content of these messages has been since published. Moffat's claims about the Cohen genetic marker were ultimately retracted by the chief scientist of BritainsDNA, and the BBC upheld a complaint about the programme.

BritainsDNA was the trade name of one of several commercial companies that comprise The Moffat Partnership Limited, founded by Moffat and partners in 2012. The other Moffat companies providing genetic testing included ScotlandsDNA (the first), IrelandsDNA, CymruDNAWales and YorkshiresDNA. BritainsDNA ceased trading in 2017.

=== Great Tapestry of Scotland ===
Moffat was co-chairman and historian for the Great Tapestry of Scotland, a community arts project which produced the embroidered tapestry, designed by Andrew Crummy with contributions from around 1000 stitchers from across Scotland. It was unveiled on 3 September 2013 at the Scottish Parliament.

== Personal life ==
Moffat met his wife Lindsay while both were students at the University of St Andrews. They were married in 1976 in the university's ancient St Salvator's Chapel, a privilege and tradition commonly reserved only for alumni, staff or their offspring. The couple have three children, two of whom also attended St Andrews.

From 2009 to 2011 he served at the invitation of James Naughtie, the Chancellor of the University of Stirling, as Chancellor's Assessor on Stirling's University Court. He resigned the position in October 2011 on being invited to stand for Rector of the University of St Andrews, an election which he won on 28 October 2011.

Academic offices
Preceded by Kevin Dunion	Rector of the University of St Andrews; 2011–2014	Succeeded by Catherine Stihler
