= David Munro (physician) =

British physician

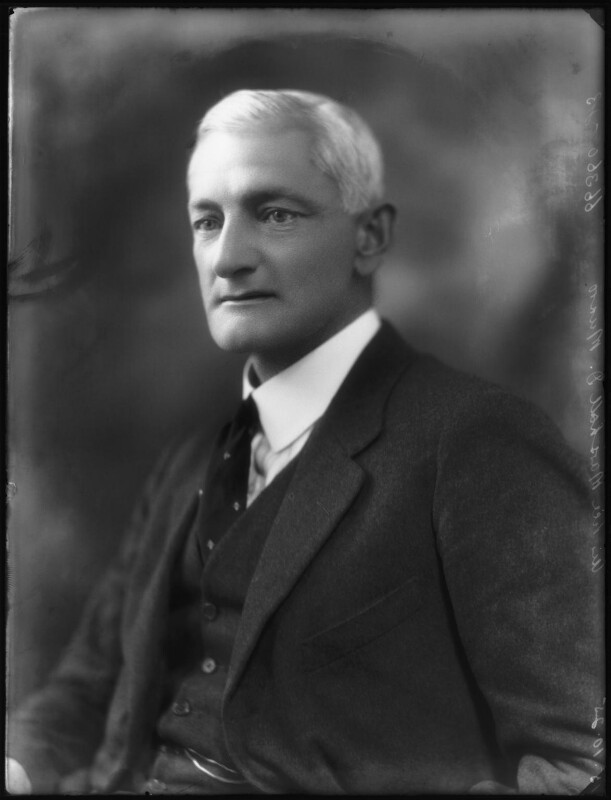
Munro in 1925

Air Vice-Marshal Sir David Munro KCB CIE (23 June 1878 – 8 November 1952) was a Scottish physician, senior Royal Air Force officer, and later Rector of the University of St Andrews.

As Director of the Royal Air Force Medical Service, he pointed out in 1925 that the speed of air travel from countries where infections were endemic to susceptible countries required consideration by public health administration.

Prior to this role, he was in the Indian Medical Service.

He served as Rector of St Andrews University from 1938 to 1946 – the longest to have served in this role due to there being no elections during World War II.

Academic offices
Preceded by Lord MacGregor Mitchell	Rector of the University of St Andrews; 1938-1946	Succeeded by Sir George Cunningham
