= John D. Pollock =

Scottish trade unionist

John Denton Pollock (21 April 1926 – 22 October 1995) was a Scottish trade unionist.

Born in Kilmarnock, Pollock attended Ayr Academy, the Royal Technical College, and then the University of Glasgow. From 1945 to 1948, he served in the Royal Engineers. He then trained as a teacher at Jordanhill College, working at Mauchline Secondary School, then in 1959 becoming head teacher at Kilmaurs Secondary School. He was active in the Ayrshire Federation of Labour, and in 1959 chaired the Scottish Labour Party.

In 1965, Pollock became rector of the Mainholm Academy, gaining a national reputation, particularly for his championing of outdoor education. He was expected to stand in the 1970 South Ayrshire by-election, but decided against a political career. He chaired the Scottish Labour Party again in 1971, speaking in support of Scottish home rule.

In 1975, Pollock became general secretary of the Educational Institute of Scotland (EIS), in which role he led a work-to-rule for improved working conditions, and then in the 1980s a successful campaign for an independent pay review. He also served on the general council of the Scottish Trade Union Congress (STUC), chairing it in 1981/82. From 1980, he also chaired the European committee of the World Confederation of Organizations of the Teaching Profession, and served on its international executive from 1986. He retired from the EIS in 1988, and his other trade union posts in 1990, becoming chair of Network Scotland.

Party political offices
Preceded by Jean Saggar	Chair of the Scottish Labour Party; 1959	Succeeded by ?
Preceded by C. Donnett	Chair of the Scottish Labour Party; 1971	Succeeded by P. Talbot
Trade union offices
Preceded by Gilbert Stewart Bryden	General Secretary of the Educational Institute of Scotland; 1975–1988	Succeeded by Jim Martin
Preceded by Jimmy Morrell	Chair of the Scottish Trade Union Congress; 1981–1982	Succeeded by Andy Barr
