= Andrea Bradley =

Scottish trade union leader

Andrea Bradley is a Scottish trade union leader.

Bradley studied at the University of Strathclyde. She became an English teacher in South Lanarkshire in Inverclyde, later moving to become a principal in South Lanarkshire. She joined the Educational Institute of Scotland (EIS), and in 2014 began working full-time for the union as national officer for education and equality. In 2022 she was elected as general secretary of the union, the first woman to hold the post. She was also elected to the General Council of the Trades Union Congress.

Trade union offices
| Preceded by Larry Flanagan | General Secretary of the Educational Institute of Scotland; 2022-present | Succeeded by Incumbent |
