= Educational Institute of Scotland =

Teachers' trade union in Scotland

EIS
- Educational Institute of Scotland
- Scottish Gaelic: Institiud Foghlaim na h-Alba
- Founded: 1847; 179 years ago
- Headquarters: Edinburgh, Scotland
- Location: Scotland
- Members: ▼58,566 (2024)
- General Secretary: Andrea Bradley
- Affiliations: STUC, TUC, EI
- Website: eis.org.uk

The Educational Institute of Scotland (EIS) (Gàidhlig: Institiud Foghlaim na h-Alba) is the oldest teachers' trade union in the world, having been founded in 1847 when dominies became concerned about the effect of changes to the system of education in Scotland on their professional status. The EIS is the largest teaching union in Scotland, representing 80% of the country's teachers and lecturers. As of 2022 it has 56,342 members.

== General Secretaries ==
1910-1915: Samual Murray
1915-1922: Hugh Cameron
1922-1926: George Crossar Pringle
1926-1941: Tom Henderson
1941-1945: John Wishart
1945-1952: Alexander J. Belford
1952-1960: William Campbell
1960-1974: Gilbert Stewart Bryden
1974-1988: John D. Pollock
1988-1995: Jim Martin
1995-2012: Ronnie Smith
2012-2022: Larry Flanagan
2022-present: Andrea Bradley

A copy of the Scottish Educational Journal from 21 June 1979, in tabloid format.

== Scottish Educational Journal ==
The magazine of the EIS started in 1876 as a densely typeset, weekly tabloid called The Educational News. In 1918, the publication was renamed Scottish Educational Journal (SEJ). Like its predecessor, the SEJ started as a weekly tabloid, but by the late 20th century it had become a monthly magazine.

== Fellowships ==
Since being granted a royal charter by Queen Victoria, it is the only union able to award degrees. A recipient of the EIS degree is a Fellow of the Educational Institute of Scotland, denoted by the post-nominal FEIS.

An early example of such a degree (awarded in December 1847) was worded as follows:

The Educational Institute of Scotland

DIPLOMA OF FELLOW.

We, the Committee of Fellows of the Educational Institute of Scotland, appointed by the General Meeting which was held in the High School of Edinburgh on Saturday the 18th September 1847 to grant Diplomas to those Members admitted within the year 1847 who might be desirous of obtaining the Grade of Junior Licentiate, Senior Licentiate or Fellow, having examined the evidence produced by Mr John Gibson Smith, Schoolmaster of Ednam, in attestation of his professional attainments, experience and skill – and having found that his testimonials certify -

1st That he is qualified to teach English, Grammar, Composition, History, Geography, Writing, Arithmetic, Algebra, Natural Science, Agricultural Chemistry, Latin, Greek and French.

2nd That he has taught with acceptance and success during a period of Twenty years all the above named branches -

Do hereby, on the 11th day of December 1847, grant to the said Mr John Gibson Smith this Diploma conferring on him the Grade of Fellow of the Educational Institute of Scotland, with all the honours rights and privileges thereto belonging.

(Signed) L. Schmits, George S. Davidson, F.R. Low L.L.D., James Fulton, John White, Alex Reid L.L.D., Walter Nichol L.L.D., Wm. Knox.

== Women in the EIS ==
The 20 June 1913 issue of The Educational News reported that the EIS had elected its first woman president, Elizabeth Fish. The report also reflected on the progress of women teachers in Scotland. "When the Institute was founded in 1847," the report says, "education was looked upon as a man's work." Women teachers were virtually absent in schools before the passage of the Education (Scotland) Act 1872, but by the time Fish was named as president, there were six times as many women teachers as men, and women were also represented in the EIS council. The article also touched upon the subject of pay equity, decrying the "shameful salaries" many women teachers were paid.

== Industrial action ==
In 2011 and again in 2018, threats of industrial action by the EIS evoked memories for many of the long-running teacher strikes of the 1980s. During the 1984-86 industrial action almost 15 million pupil days were lost across Scotland. It was a sustained campaign in opposition to the Conservative Government. Former trade union leader Larry Flanagan described it as "the first time that any group of workers, anywhere in the UK, successfully stood firm in defiance of a concerted, ideologically driven attack by the Tory government."

In March 2026, the EIS secured an 85% vote in favour of strike action on a 60% turnout in support of achieving a reduction in pupil contact to 21 hours per week.

== See also ==
- Scottish Trades Union Congress
