= Elizabeth Fish =

Scottish educator (1860–1944)

Elizabeth Mary Jane Fish
- Born: 22 December 1860; Glasgow, Scotland
- Died: 21 March 1944 (aged 83); Paisley, Scotland
- Known for: First elected woman president of the EIS trade union
- Parents: William Fish (father); Jane McNaughton (mother)

Elizabeth Mary Jane Fish (22 December 1860 – 21 March 1944) was a schoolteacher and the first elected woman president of the Educational Institute of Scotland, the oldest teachers' trade union in the world.

== Early life and education ==
Elizabeth Fish was born at 83 North Woodside Road in Glasgow, Scotland, in 1860. to Jane McNaughton and William Fish, a city missionary. William was chaplain at Sharp's Institution in Perth and it was here that Fish was schooled.

Fish returned to Glasgow to become a pupil teacher, starting out at Henderson Street public school where she came first in Scotland in the Queen's Scholarship examination. Following this, she went on to study at the Glasgow Church of Scotland Training College.

In 1885, Fish graduated LLA (Lady Literate in Arts) from St. Andrews University, studying French and Italian, for which she was awarded the Society of Arts medal.

== Career ==
Between 1881 and 1895, Fish taught for the Glasgow School Board, teaching at Runford Street public school and Shields Road public school. She then went on to teach at the Pupil-Teachers Institute, Glasgow, from 1895 to 1907 before moving on to teach at Whitehill Higher Grade school and John Street Higher Grade school from 1907 to 1920.

Fish also ran evening classes to help people who stammer and gave lectures in physiology and hygiene. She resisted calls from eugenicists to introduce "race improvement" into teaching and believed "sex hygiene" was a parental responsibility rather than something that should be introduced into the classroom.

== Later years ==
Fish was president of the Scottish Modern Languages Association (SMLA) for two years and became principal teacher of Modern Languages at Bellahouston Academy in 1920 until her retirement in 1925. She was a leading public figure in Glasgow and held office in the Glasgow branches of the Class Teachers' Association and the Educational Institute of Scotland (EIS) as convenor of the EIS Central Ladies Committee from 1902 onwards.

In June 1913, Fish was elected the first woman president of the EIS. She polled 4,822 votes compared with the other three male candidates whose combined votes totaled 3,068 votes.

== Equal pay ==
In January 1914, Fish acknowledged that the question of equal pay was a controversial one for members of the Scottish and English Teachers' Associations and called for improvements to teachers' salaries during her presidential address at the annual congress. While condemning the low pay of women teachers, she argued that:

"If we teachers ask that the salaries of all teachers be now raised to the level of what men teachers think theirs ought to be, we shall alienate the sympathies of a public not yet convinced of the justice of our demand."

== Death and legacy ==
Elizabeth Fish died in Paisley Infirmary on 21 March 1944 after a fall at home. She was 83. The next day, her obituary in the Glasgow Herald described Fish as "the champion of women teachers in Scotland".
