= Jackie Fullerton =

Northern Irish television presenter and journalist

Jackie Fullerton MBE
- Born: 2 May 1943 (age 82); Ballymena, Northern Ireland
- Occupations: Author, Television presenter, Journalist

John Alexander Fullerton, MBE (born 22 May 1943) is a Northern Irish television presenter and journalist, who was a reporter and football commentator for BBC Northern Ireland until he retired in 2016. However, he made a return in 2020 to commentate on Ballymena United matches for their live streaming services while no fans were in attendance due to COVID-19.

== Sporting career ==
Fullerton was born in Ballymena and was a footballer with Irish league clubs Ballymena United, Cliftonville, Derry City and Crusaders; winning the Irish League title with Crusaders in the 1972/1973 season.

On 6 August 1966, Ballymena United were the visitors when Fullerton became Cliftonville's first ever used substitute at Solitude.

In addition to his football career, Fullerton also played cricket for Ballymena.

== Broadcasting career ==
=== UTV ===
Fullerton's presenting career began in 1973 as a reporter and presenter for Ulster Television. He was invited to work for the station by station controller Sidney Perry after participating in a penalty competition for the Sportscast programme and became the main sports anchor on UTV's evening magazine programme, Good Evening Ulster.

In his autobiography, Fullerton revealed he almost accepted a sports reporter position at Granada Television in 1978, but decided to remain in Northern Ireland for the sake of his family. He also disclosed the controversy caused by rumours of an affair with Good Evening Ulster presenting colleague Gloria Hunniford, which were untrue. It was during his time on Good Evening Ulster when, in 1980, Fullerton interviewed wrestler Giant Haystacks in the studio, who proceeded to slam him on the studio floor – a clip which has been repeated on various blooper TV shows since.

=== BBC ===
Fullerton moved from Ulster Television to BBC Northern Ireland in 1992.

In 2004, the BBC announced that Fullerton would no longer introduce the sport during BBC Newsline, but his reporting and commentating duties would still continue. The same year saw Fullerton undergo triple heart by-pass surgery following a period of ill health. He returned to commentary duties in January 2005.

In 2007, Sky Sports obtained live broadcast rights to Northern Ireland's international matches for £10million. Rumours circulated at the time that Fullerton had been approached by the network to commentate on their coverage of Northern Ireland games. These rumours were unfounded when Fullerton disclosed while he had talks with Sky, he had signed a 'rolling contract' to remain with BBC Northern Ireland.

== DVDs ==
In 2008, Fullerton interviewed Northern Ireland international David Healy on the footballer's DVD, David Healy, The Talisman.

== Writing ==
Fullerton published his autobiography, Jackie: "I Did It My Way", in 2006. He is married with three sons: Darren, Nicky and Gareth, who are all sports journalists themselves.

== Honours ==
Fullerton was appointed MBE in 2010 for his services to sports journalism and his wide-ranging service to the community.

== Personal life ==
Before becoming a footballer, Fullerton trained to be an accountant. As a sideline to his broadcasting career, Fullerton has also sung on television and on stage. His uncle Alex Russell was a footballer who played for Linfield and earned one cap for the Northern Ireland national team.

== Sporting honours ==
- Irish League:
  - Crusaders 1972/73
