= Scottish Solicitors' Discipline Tribunal =

- Established: 1 September 1980; 44 years ago
- Jurisdiction: Scotland
- Location: Unit 3.5, Granary Business Centre, Coal Road, Cupar KY15 5YQ
- Composition method: Appointed by Lord President of the Court of Session
- Authorised by: Solicitors (Scotland) Act 1980 (as amended)
- Appeals to: Court of Session
- Website: www.ssdt.org.uk

Chairman
- Currently: Colin Bell
- Since: 2 June 2021

The Scottish Solicitors' Discipline Tribunal (SSDT) is a specialist tribunal in Scotland with jurisdiction over serious disciplinary issues within the solicitor profession in Scotland.

== History ==
The Tribunal was established by section 50 of the Solicitors (Scotland) Act 1980.

== Remit and jurisdiction ==
=== Professional misconduct jurisdiction ===
Complaints regarding solicitors in Scotland are initially made to the Scottish Legal Complaints Commission. The Commission then sifts those complaints and determines if they are service-related (in which case the SLCC has jurisdiction) or conduct-related. If complaints are related to the conduct of a solicitor the complaints are referred to the Law Society of Scotland, whose Council can determine if the complaint relates to unsatisfactory conduct (which the Law Society deals with internally) or professional misconduct which is then prosecuted before the Tribunal.

Should the Tribunal determine that a case relates to unsatisfactory conduct then the case is referred to the Law Society.

=== Section 53(1)(b) Complaint ===
A Section 53(1)(b) complaint is a complaint that a solicitor has been convicted by a court in an act involving dishonesty, fined in amount equivalent to level 4 on the standard scale, or sentenced to imprisonment for a term of 12 months or more.

=== Appellate jurisdiction ===
The Tribunal deals with the following appeals:

- Applications for restoration to the Roll of Solicitors and Applications for Removal of a Restriction on a practising certificate
- Appeals by solicitors / lay complainers against findings / failure to make findings of unsatisfactory professional conduct.

In relation to Section 42ZA Appeal, the Tribunal can:

1. Quash or Confirm the Determination of the Law Society.
2. Quash the Censure accompanying the Determination.
3. Quash/Confirm/Vary the Direction being appealed against.
4. Order retraining of the solicitor.
5. Impose a Fine not exceeding £2,000.
6. Order compensation to be paid to the lay complainer not exceeding £5,000.

=== Penalties ===
In relation to professional misconduct complaints, the Tribunal can:

1. Censure.
2. Impose a Fine of up to £10,000.
3. Impose a Restriction on a Solicitor’s practising certificate.
4. Suspend the Solicitor for a period of time.
5. Strike the Solicitor’s name from the Roll of Solicitors in Scotland.
6. If the Tribunal considers that the Secondary Complainer has been directly affected by the misconduct, the Tribunal has power to direct the solicitor to pay compensation of such amount not exceeding £5,000 as the Tribunal may specify for any loss, inconvenience or distress resulting from the misconduct.

== Rules ==
The Tribunal operates under a set of rules which must be approved by the Lord President of the Court of Session. As of May 2018, the Tribunal operated under the Scottish Solicitors’ Discipline Tribunal Rules 2008, which came into effect on 1 October 2008.

== Tribunal ==
The Tribunal consists of two solicitors (who cannot be members of the governing body of the Law Society of Scotland, the Council of the Law Society of Scotland) and two lay members who are drawn from all walks of life. All members are appointed by the Lord President of the Court of Session.

=== Solicitor Members ===
The present Solicitor members of the Tribunal are:

- Colin Bell (Chair)
- Catherine Hart (Vice Chair)
- Beverley Atkinson (Vice Chair)
- Benjamin Kemp (Vice Chair)
- Kenneth Paterson (Vice Chair)
- Chris Mackay
- David Dickson
- Tom Hempleman
- Sally Swinney
- Deborah Lovell
- Vincent McGovern
- Mark Hastings

=== Lay Members ===
The present lay members of the Tribunal are:

- Professor Kay Hampton
- Martin Saville
- Julius Erolin
- Paul Hindley
- Dr Kenneth Mitchell
- Ian Shearer
- Edward Egan
- John Duffy
- Christine Pacitti
- Paula Charlesworth
- Dozie Azubike
- Douglas Cochrane
