= Alexander Durie Russell =

1913

Alexander Durie Russell FRSE FRAS (1872–1955) was a 20th-century Scottish mathematician, schoolmaster and amateur astronomer. He was President of the Edinburgh Mathematical Society 1915/16.

== Life ==
He was born in Edinburgh on 22 July 1872, the son of Janet Durie and her husband, Thomas Russell, a grocer and spirit dealer. The family lived at 19 Graham Street and had a shop at 42 West Richmond Street in the city's South Side. Russell was educated at George Heriot's School then studied mathematics and natural philosophy (physics) at the University of Edinburgh graduating with a BSc in 1896. While at University he was awarded a Neil Arnott Scholarship in Experimental Physics, and studied chemistry under Alexander Crum Brown, mathematics with George Chrystal and physics with Peter Guthrie Tait.

On graduating he became a Demonstrator in physics at the University. He then taught, first at Morelands School in Edinburgh then in the summer of 1897 went to Stranraer High School. In 1899 he joined Falkirk High School where he stayed for the rest of his career.

In 1905 he was elected a Fellow of the Royal Society of Edinburgh. His proposers were William Peddie, John Brown Clark, Robert Traill Omond, and Cargill Gilston Knott.

He retired in 1937 and died on 20 January 1955.

== Family ==
He was married.
