= A Constitution for a Free Scotland =

SNP outline of independence plans

In September 2002, the Scottish National Party (SNP) published a document, entitled A Constitution for a Free Scotland, which details their policy for the Constitution of a future independent Scotland. This Constitution, which would come into effect following Scotland's transition to independence, would set out the rights of citizens of an independent Scotland, and define the powers and responsibilities of government and parliament.

A later version of the document was published by the Constitutional Committee in 2011.

== Historical background ==
The 2002 paper represents the culmination of many years' work. The essential elements of the Constitutional Policy were first adopted at the SNP's National Conference in 1977. The original drafting committee was convened by the late Dr Robert McIntyre, assisted by Professor Neil MacCormick, Dr Allan Macartney, Peter Chiene, Kenneth Fee, Isobel Lindsay and Barbara Park. The spirit of the original proposal has been retained in subsequent revisions, including a substantial review in 1990–1991.

In 2020 an online interactive public consultation was introduced by an independent Scottish Charity and is actively engaged in seeking comments and amendments to a Model Constitution. The facility provides for automatic grading for voting the popularity of proposed amendments and will remain actively open for an indefinite period. Access to the Model Constitution and the public consultation is at https://constitutionforscotland.scot"

== Aims and principles ==
The SNP Draft Constitution declares itself to be necessary "to protect the rights of every Scottish citizen and to place restrictions on what politicians can and can't do". The draft "envisages an inclusive Scotland that embraces its geographic and cultural diversity, where its citizens are free from discrimination on any grounds in the exercise of their constitutional rights". The intention is to "give voice to the Scottish people and provide the means for us to take control of the decisions affecting our lives".

== Article One: Constitution and People ==
Article One, entitled "Constitution and People" sets out some of the foundations of the Scottish State, including:

1. The right of the people of Scotland to self-determination and national sovereignty.
2. A declaration of Scotland's territorial claims to the mainland and islands of Scotland, and to Scotland's offshore (oil and gas) resources.
3. A declaration of constitutional supremacy: the Constitution is the supreme law and any other legislation which is incompatible with the Constitution will therefore be null and void.
4. An inclusive definition of citizenship, with reserved rights of residency for non-citizens resident in Scotland at the time of independence. Voting is from age 16.

There is no preamble or declaration of principles, and no mention of Scotland's flag, anthem, or capital.

== Article Two: Head of State and Executive ==
Article Two sets out the arrangement for the Head of State and the Executive:

1. The Queen would be retained as Head of State, with the title of "Queen of Scots", making Scotland a Commonwealth realm. The Union of 1603 – a personal union between the Scots Crown and that of England – would thereby be maintained, even though the Union of 1707 – a governmental union of two States and two Parliaments – would be dissolved.
2. The Constitution for Scotland states that the monarch would hold title under the law of Scotland, so presumably the Parliament of Scotland could, at some future time, alter the law of succession in such a way that this personal union is dissolved. A Scottish Parliament would also be able, if it so desired at some future time, to remove the religious proscriptions which ban Roman Catholics from inheriting the Crown under the Act of Settlement.
3. Executive powers are vested in the Head of State, who is expected and required to act on the advice of the Prime Minister and Ministers. The Prime Minister is to be elected by Parliament, and Ministers are to be confirmed by Parliament. The government as a whole is accountable to Parliament by means of a motion of confidence, in accordance with the rules of the parliamentary system.
4. When the Queen is not present in Scotland, the elected Presiding Officer (i.e. Speaker) of Parliament would act as Head of State.

The SNP is committed to holding a referendum on the future of the monarchy within the first term of a post-independence Parliament, but no explicit provision for this is made in the proposed Constitution.

== Article Three: The Legislature ==
Article Three makes provision for a Parliament of Scotland, which will possess legislative (law making) power, as well as being responsible for debating policies and holding the Executive to account.

The Constitution makes a number of breaks from British constitutional practice which were seen as radical in the 1970s but are, according to the SNP's Policy Paper, now accepted as part of Scottish political life:

1. The Parliament of Scotland will be unicameral, in keeping with the tradition of the old Scottish Parliament before 1707 and that of the Devolved Scottish Parliament today.
2. The Parliament will be elected by proportional representation. The SNP favours the Single Transferable Vote system, but the exact electoral system used will be determined by ordinary legislation.
3. Parliament elected for four-year fixed terms. Early dissolution is permitted only if a government enjoying parliamentary support cannot be formed: the Prime Minister cannot dissolve Parliament at will. Parliament may also extend its term of office, in times of war, for up to one year.
4. To compensate for the lack of a second chamber, a minority veto procedure (whereby two-fifths of the members of Parliament can delay a bill for up to a year, subject to the right of the majority to refer the bill to the people in a referendum) is included. This is intended to prevent rash legislation by a Parliamentary majority.
5. A stronger committee system will also be instituted, with pre-legislative scrutiny of legislation in parliamentary committees, although the Constitution is sparse on detail.
6. Parliament would have control over declarations of war and the ratification of treaties. Treaties which amend the Constitution (e.g. treaties of European integration) must be passed by a three-fifths majority in Parliament and ratified by a national referendum.

== Article Four: Local Government ==
Article Four recognises and guarantees the independence of elected local Councils, which are also to be elected by proportional representation. The Islands authorities (Orkney, Shetland and the Western Isles) also have certain guaranteed privileges which may not be removed by ordinary legislation.

Note: the constitutionally guaranteed status of local Councils was not included in the 1977 document, but has been included in the 2002 version.

== Article Five: The Judiciary ==
The Constitution recognises the independence of the judiciary:

1. Judges are to be appointed by the Head of State on the advice of an independent appointments commission, consisting of the Lord Advocate, the Presiding Officer of Parliament, a Senator of the College of Justice and two impartial members elected by Parliament.
2. Judges may only be removed from office, for misconduct, by a two-thirds majority vote of Parliament.

== Article Six: Fundamental Rights and Liberties ==
The Constitution entrenches a number of fundamental rights and liberties, including freedom of speech, religion, assembly, movement, privacy, fair trial, due process etc. These are based on the European Convention on Human Rights.

Social and economic rights, such as entitlements to public housing, unemployment benefit, pensions, public healthcare, and education, are included, but there is no protection for trial by jury and no rule preventing double jeopardy.

The rights and liberties guaranteed in the Constitution may be waived during a State of Emergency. A State of Emergency must be approved by a three-fifths majority of the members of Parliament within two weeks, and may continue for up to three months, after which it must be renewed by Parliament.

== Article Seven: Amendments ==
The Constitution may be amended by a three-fifths majority vote of Parliament, subject to approval by a majority of the people in a referendum.

== Other noteworthy features ==
1. The SNP draft Constitution is noticeably shorter than most modern (post-1945 and post-1989) European Constitutions, at around 6000 words.
2. The relationships between the Executive and the Parliament are not clearly defined, particularly with regard to the election of a Prime Minister and the procedure for votes of confidence. This leaves scope for the regulation of these matters by law, standing orders of Parliament, or, in the absence of such provision, by existing parliamentary custom.
3. In contrast to contemporary European practice, the SNP's Constitution for Scotland does not clearly distinguish between the respective roles of the Head of State and the Executive (compare with the Constitutions of Spain or Sweden, where such a distinction is explicitly made).
4. The Constitution does specify the size of Parliament, only that it must be at least four times the size of the Executive (the number of Ministers is limited to one-fifth of the members of Parliament).
5. The qualifications for membership of Parliament, and any incompatibilities between membership of Parliament and other public offices, are unspecified. These matters are subject to determination by Parliament, in accordance with the usual legislative process.

There is no mention in the Constitution for an Auditor-General or an Ombudsman, although both institutions currently exist in Scotland under Statute law. There is provision for Freedom of Information, but no reference to the Scottish Information Commissioner.
