= Local Government and Social Care Ombudsman =

Public body in the United Kingdom

- Commission for Local Administration in England
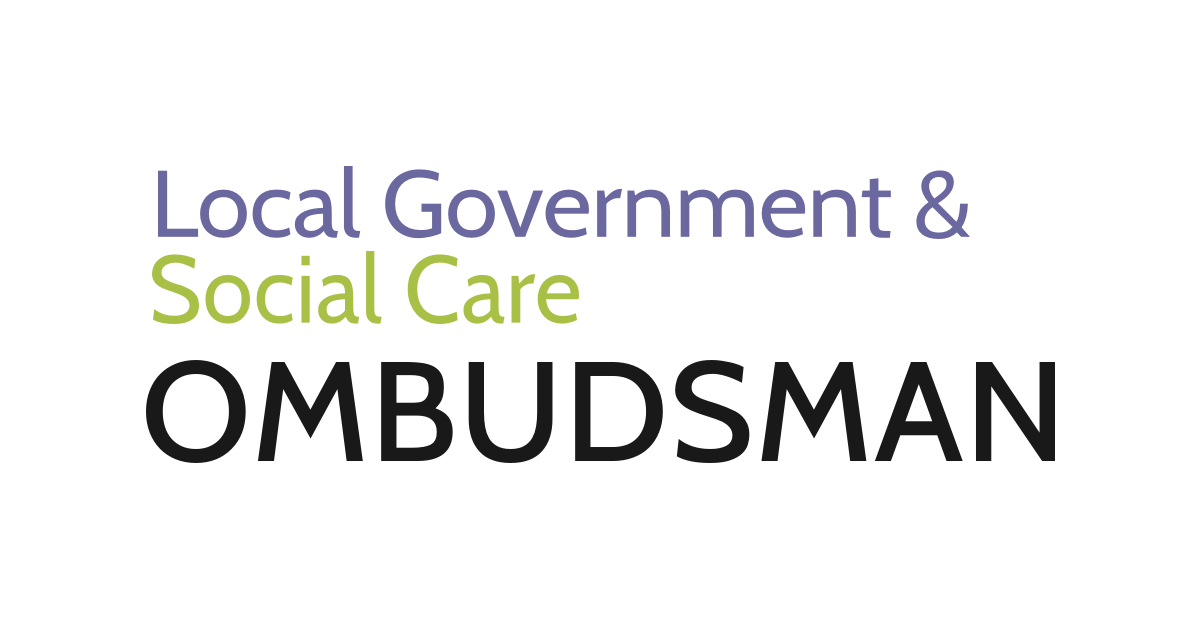

Agency overview
- Jurisdiction: England
- Headquarters: Coventry, England
- Employees: 178 (2024)
- Website: www.lgo.org.uk

The Local Government and Social Care Ombudsman (LGSCO), legally the Commission for Local Administration in England and formerly known as the Local Government Ombudsman (LGO), investigates complaints from members of the public about councils and some other some other authorities and organisations providing public services in England. It also investigates complaints about registered adult social care providers. It is the last stage of the complaints process, for people who have given the council or provider opportunity to resolve the issue first. It is a free service. Similar duties are carried out by the Public Services Ombudsman for Wales, the Scottish Public Services Ombudsman and the Northern Ireland Public Services Ombudsman. As of April 2023, the (interim) Local Government and Social Care Ombudsman is Paul Najsarek.

== History ==
The individual Local Government Ombudsman commissioner positions were created as a result of the Local Government Act 1974, which was amended by the Regulatory Reform Order 2007 No 1889 and the Local Government and Public Involvement in Health Act 2007.

In 1995, a review conducted by Geoffrey Chipperfield, working for the Secretary of State for the Environment, recommended abolition of the local government ombudsmen on the grounds that it would not be able to handle the increasing volume of local government complaints effectively. Chipperfield recommended that all stages of a complaint, including external review, should be carried out locally. The government, however, declined to act on the report, stating that they believed that the CLA continued to be necessary, and that though local complaint systems were important, it wasn't necessary to create new statute mandating and maintaining such systems.

In 2007, then Prime Minister Gordon Brown stated, during a House of Commons debate on constitutional reform, that he believed that the House of Commons should have more authority over the selection of "public officials whose role it is to protect the public's rights and interests, and for whom there is not currently independent scrutiny. That includes…the local government ombudsman…"

== Duties ==
The Local Government Ombudsman investigates allegations of maladministration that have caused injustice to the complainant. Most council services can be investigated including some areas of housing, planning, education, social services, council tax, housing benefit and highways. Registered adult social care services can be investigated regardless of whether there has been council input into the care. The Local Government Ombudsman provides dispute resolution services free of charge to the complainants. It will usually only become involved after a council's complaints procedure has been exhausted.

If the LGO finds the body investigated acted with fault, which caused the person an injustice, it will recommend a remedy to put things right. The LGO remedies are aimed at putting the person back in the position they would have been were it not for the fault. Where appropriate it also recommends action to avoid similar issues affecting other people – such as reviewing practice and procedure – and can recommend remedies for other persons affected by faults found in an individual complaint.

As the 2014/15 fiscal year, the service cost approximately £12 million per annum. The Commission for Local Administration is the official title of the body that runs the Local Government Ombudsman service. The stated objective of the LGO is to remedy injustice and improve local public services. This includes issuing advice on good administrative practice in local government based on experience from prior investigations and also offer training in complaint handling to councils and care providers.

Although it will hear complaints of maladministration stemming from the actions of individual councillors and council employees, the service can only seek to remedy the injustice and cannot discipline the person responsible. Unless they are also members of a professional body, such as the Law Society, individual officers can only be disciplined by their employer.

== Complaint process ==
If a complainant is not satisfied with the outcome of a complaint against a local council or care provider he or she can submit a complaint to the LGO. They can also ask an advocate (including a councillor or MP) to do so on their behalf. The LGO will decide whether or not to investigate. Before coming to a final decision on an investigation, the LGO presents both parties with a provisional finding that they can comment on, which will be considered before a final decision is made. Complainants can only ask the LGO to reconsider its decision if they can demonstrate it was based on important evidence that contains facts that were not accurate, and they can show this using readily available information, or they have new and relevant information that was not previously available and which affects the decision made.

=== Results ===
In 2014/15 the LGO registered 20,286 new complaints and enquiries. 11,094 complaints and enquiries required further consideration and were referred to its assessment team. Of those, 6,314 people were helped by explaining why the issue was not in the LGO's jurisdiction or why a detailed investigation could not be pursued. 4,780 complaints were investigated in detail.

Councils do not have a legal obligation to comply with the Local Government Ombudsman's recommendations, even those in a published report, though the Ombudsman states that less than one per cent of cases are not complied with in full.

One risk of taking a complaint to the Local Government Ombudsman is that the complainant may run out of time to seek judicial review of a council's decision, missing the opportunity to raise the original matter in court. Judicial review must be sought within three months in the UK whereas only 54% of 2004/5 Ombudsman cases were determined within this time.

== Complaints about the Local Government Ombudsman ==
Complainants dissatisfied with the way an LGO investigator deals with a complaint have recourse to the LGO's complaints procedure. It will try to resolve complaints quickly and directly with the person or section of its service concerned, but if not resolved a service complaint will be considered by a senior manager.

== Judicial review ==
Although the Local Government Ombudsman case decisions cannot be appealed directly to any external authority, judicial review can be sought through the high court if the ombudsman acts contrary to the laws that govern it or the decision made is deemed to be Wednesbury unreasonable. Costs can be claimed if the challenge is successful. Judges do not overturn decisions of the Local Government Ombudsman but can require the Ombudsman to reconsider. For example, in 2022, one case concerning the ombudsman went before the High Court for judicial review, namely Milburn, R (On the Application Of) v The Local Government and Social Care Ombudsman [2022], and the high court found that the ombudsman was wrong to refuse to consider cases where the local authority had claimed to have acted when they had not.

== Publications ==
The service publishes quite extensively, including:

- All of its decisions (unless it's deemed that publishing would compromise the anonymity of the complainant)
- Public interest investigation reports
- Its complaints data for local authorities and care providers, including the annual review letters sent to councils updating on their performance over the year
- Regular Focus Reports looking at systemic issues from complaints
- Annual review reports of Local Government and Social Care complaints
