= Scottish Information Commissioner =

The Scottish Information Commissioner (Scottish Gaelic: Coimiseanair Fiosrachaidh na h-Alba) is responsible for the promotion and enforcement of the Freedom of Information (Scotland) Act 2002 (FOISA) and the Environmental Information (Scotland) Regulations 2004(Scottish EIRs). The current Scottish Information Commissioner is David Hamilton who took up post on 16 October 2023.

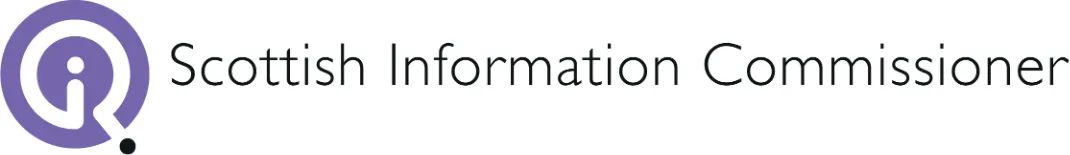
Scottish Information Commissioner

== Background ==
This legislation generates thousands of requests to Scotland's public authorities for information. Often these involve high profile, controversial or sensitive matters, which have to be resolved when appealed to the Commissioner. The Commissioner employs 21 staff in St Andrews, Fife, Scotland, to help him investigate and decide upon cases, provide information to the public on their rights, and assess whether Scottish public authorities are following good practice.

FOISA came into full force on 1 January 2005, at the same time as the Scottish EIRs. In July 2010, the 1,000th decision was issued by the Scottish Information Commissioner. The Commissioner publishes information on the number of cases he has on hand on his website. The Commissioner issues guidance for public authorities on their obligations under FOISA, and publishes information on rights to information for the public.

The Commissioner is appointed by The King on the nomination of the Scottish Parliament, and is an independent public official who makes legally enforceable decisions. They can be enforced by the Court of Session and public authorities may be held in contempt of court if an authority fails to comply with a decision notice.

== Holders of the Post ==
The first Commissioner was Kevin Dunion, appointed in February 2003. Towards the end of his second term he proposed extra powers that he thought that the next Commissioner would need. He left office on 23 February 2012 after two terms - a total of nine years in office, during which time he handled some 1,500 cases. It was announced on 3 February 2017, that Rosemary Agnew, the previous Scottish Information Commissioner, would be stepping down on 30 April 2017 and taking up a post as the Scottish Public Services Ombudsman on 1 May 2017. In June 2017, Fitzhenry was nominated for the role, having previously worked in the Royal Air Force's legal branch. Former Police Scotland Inspector David Hamilton is the current Scottish Information Commissioner having been nominated by the Scottish Parliament on 28 June 2023

Name	Took up post	Status
David Hamilton	16 October 2023	Incumbent
Daren Fitzhenry	25 October 2017	15 October 2023
Margaret Keyse‡	1 May 2017	22 October 2017
Rosemary Agnew	1 May 2012	30 April 2017
Margaret Keyse‡	24 February 2012	30 April 2012
Kevin Dunion	24 February 2003	23 February 2012

‡ held the post temporarily while it was vacant
