= Alex Russell (footballer, born 1923) =

Northern Irish footballer (1923–2014)

Personal information
- Full name: Alexander Russell
- Date of birth: 18 January 1923
- Place of birth: Kells, Northern Ireland
- Date of death: 24 February 2014 (aged 91)
- Place of death: Antrim, Northern Ireland
- Height: 1.78 m (5 ft 10 in)
- Position: Goalkeeper

Youth career
- Ballymena Tech

Senior career*
Years	Team	Apps	(Gls)
–1941	Summerfield F.C.		
1941–1944	Cliftonville		
1944–1960	Linfield		

International career
1946	Ireland (IFA)	1	(0)
1950–1958	Irish League XI	11	(0)
- * Club domestic league appearances and goals

Alexander Russell (18 January 1923 – 24 February 2014) was a Northern Irish footballer who played as a goalkeeper.

== Career ==
Russell made over 600 appearances for Linfield, winning 39 medals.

He earned one cap for Northern Ireland in 1946.

== Personal life ==
Russell was born on 18 January 1923 in Kells, County Antrim. He is the uncle of footballer Jackie Fullerton, who later worked as reporter and football commentator for BBC Northern Ireland. Russell died on 24 February 2014 in Antrim at the age of 91.
