= Alex Russell (footballer, born 1944) =

English footballer (1944–2022)

Personal information
- Date of birth: 21 February 1944 (age 82)
- Place of birth: Seaham, England
- Date of death: 12 June 2022 (aged 78)
- Place of death: Southport, England
- Position: Midfielder

Youth career
- 1961–1963: Everton

Senior career*
Years	Team	Apps	(Gls)
1963–1970	Southport	263	(63)
1970–1971	Blackburn Rovers	24	(4)
1971–1973	Tranmere Rovers	55	(7)
1973	→ Crewe Alexandra (loan)	4	(0)
1973–1975	Southport	85	(12)
1975–1978	Formby		
- Los Angeles Aztecs
Total		431	(86)
- * Club domestic league appearances and goals

Alex Russell (21 February 1944 – 12 June 2022) was a footballer who played as a midfielder in the Football League for Southport, Blackburn Rovers, Tranmere Rovers and Crewe Alexandra.

He then had a three-year spell playing for non-league Formby. His debut was on 8 November 1975 at Witton Albion, a week before the debut of Ron Smith. Russell stayed with the Squirrels, frequently playing as captain, for three years, including lifting the Liverpool Senior Cup in August 1978. He left the club in November 1978.
