= Scottish Legal Complaints Commission =

Agency overview
- Formed: October 1, 2008; 17 years ago
- Preceding agency: Scottish Legal Services Ombudsman
- Type: non-departmental public body
- Jurisdiction: Scotland
- Headquarters: Capital Building, 12-13 St Andrew Square, Edinburgh
- Annual budget: £1.8 million
- Agency executives: Jim Martin, Chair; Neil Stevenson, Chief Executive
- Website: www.scottishlegalcomplaints.org.uk

The Scottish Legal Complaints Commission (SLCC) is a non-departmental public body responsible dealing with unresolved complaints against legal practitioners operating in Scotland. It was established under the Legal Profession and Legal Aid (Scotland) Act 2007 and came into operation on 1 October 2008, replacing the Scottish Legal Services Ombudsman.

The Commission investigates and resolves complaints about inadequate professional service provided by solicitors, advocates, and commercial attorneys, but only investigates how the complaint was dealt with by the relevant professional organisation. Conduct complaints are referred to the relevant professional organisation.

The Commission has the power to fine legal practitioners whose service is sub-standard, but has no power to suspend or remove a solicitor's license to practice - such power rests with the Scottish Solicitors' Discipline Tribunal.

Decisions of the Commission are subject to judicial review by the Court of Session.

As of May 2018, the Chair of the Commission is Jim Martin, and the Chief Executive is Neil Stevenson

== History ==
Proposals for the Scottish Legal Services Commission were announced by the Scottish Executive on 22 December 2005. The proposals retained self-regulation of conduct with the Law Society of Scotland and the Faculty of Advocates, with only unresolved service complaints being in the remit of the new Commission. The proposals also stated that funding of the new Commission would come from a levy on practising lawyers, and a further levy on those who are subject to complaints. Such proposals were not without criticism with both the Dead of the Faculty of Advocates and President of the Law Society of Scotland criticising the complexity and costs of the proposed system.

The Commission was established under the Legal Profession and Legal Aid (Scotland) Act 2007 and came into operation on 1 October 2008, replacing the Scottish Legal Services Ombudsman.

Previously, Bill Brackenridge had served as Chair, having taken over in February 2013, from Jane Irvine who had been the first chair of the Commission and who left office at the end of 2012. Jane Irvine had served the Scottish Legal Services Ombudsman from April 2006.

On 20 March 2018, the Law Society of Scotland criticised the Commission's proposal for a larger budget for 2018/19, and a 10% rise in the levy on solicitors. The President of the Law Society of Scotland stated, "People rightly ask why the SLCC is increasing its budget when eligible complaints for them to investigate are falling."

== Remit and jurisdiction ==
=== Consumer Panel ===
The Commission has a Consumer Panel which is mandated by Schedule 1, Section 11A of the Legal Profession and Legal Aid (Scotland) Act 2007.

=== Finances ===
The Commission is responsible for managing its own finances and setting its own annual budget and it is not funded by the public. It has an annual income of around £1.8 million, raised through a levy which is collected from the Law Society of Scotland, the Faculty of Advocates and the Association of Commercial Attorneys.

=== Judicial Review ===
Decisions of the Commission are subject to judicial review by the Court of Session, but can only be heard with the permission of the Court. However, a complaint can only be brought if the following grounds are met, set out in Section 21 of the 2007 Act are met:

1. that the Commission's decision was based on an error of law;
2. that there has been a procedural impropriety in the conduct of any hearing by the Commission on the complaint;
3. that the Commission has acted irrationally in the exercise of its discretion;
4. that the Commission's decision was not supported by the facts found to be established by the Commission.

=== Service and Conduct Complaints ===
The Commission was designed a single-point of contact for complaints against legal practitioners, and as such has the power to determine if a complaint is service-related or conduct-related. Service-related complaints remain with the Commission, whilst conduct complaints are sent to the relevant professional organisation. By 2016, the Commission had developed a practice of classifying a complaint as a hybrid complaint - being both service and conduct related. However, the Inner House of the Court of Session ruled, in 2016, that the Commission lacked this power, and had to classify a complaint as either service-related or conduct-related. The Inner House deemed it ultra vires for the Commission to make a determination that a complaint was a hybrid of conduct and service.

The Law Society of Scotland challenged the Commission's power to decide if a complaint previously classified as hybridwas either a service-related or conduct-related complaint. The Inner House found, unanimously, in favour of the Commission, affirming that the Commission has power as a matter of law of re-categorise or re-determine any previously categorised hybrid complaint. The Commission alone has the power to determine if a complaint is service-related or conduct-related, and such power is an exercise of administrative law, and as such is within its power.
