= Alex Russell (footballer, born 1973) =

English footballer (born 1973)

Personal information
- Date of birth: 17 March 1973 (age 53)
- Place of birth: Crosby, England
- Height: 5 ft 10 in (1.78 m)
- Position: Midfielder

Team information
- Current team: Leichhardt Lions FC

Senior career*
Years	Team	Apps	(Gls)
1993–1994	Burscough		
1994–1998	Rochdale	101	(14)
1995	→ Glenavon (loan)	4	(0)
1998–2001	Cambridge United	81	(8)
2001–2005	Torquay United	153	(20)
2005–2008	Bristol City	56	(6)
2007–2008	→ Northampton Town (loan)	13	(1)
2008	→ Cheltenham Town (loan)	13	(2)
2008–2009	Cheltenham Town	23	(0)
2009	→ Exeter City (loan)	7	(0)
2009–2010	Exeter City	29	(1)
2010–2011	Bath City	12	(2)
2011	Yeovil Town	14	(0)
2011–2012	Bath City	31	(1)
2012–2013	Clevedon Town		
Total		537	(55)
- * Club domestic league appearances and goals

Alexander John Russell (born 17 March 1973) is an English former professional footballer who played as a central midfielder. His father, Alex Russell played professionally for Southport, Blackburn Rovers, Tranmere Rovers and Los Angeles Aztecs.

In January 2008 Russell joined League One side Cheltenham Town on a one-month loan. On 31 January, Russell's loan was extended to the end of the season. He signed permanently for Cheltenham Town on 17 June 2008 after he was released by Bristol City. Joined League Two side Exeter City on loan in February 2009 until the end of the season with a view to a permanent deal.

He signed a permanent one-year deal with Exeter City in July 2009. On 14 May 2010, it was announced that he had been released by Exeter, along with eight other players.

On 4 January 2011, it was announced that a move to League One Yeovil Town had been finalised. He was informed by the club at the end of the 2010/11 season that he was one of seven players who would be re-signed, Russell later rejected this offer and returned to Bath City. But he left when Bath was relegated at the end of the 2011–12 season from the Conference National, Russell signed with Southern League South & West Division side Clevedon Town in the summer of 2012.

On 10 March 2013, he announced on Twitter, "Officially retiring from playing! 24 yr career,not a bad effort! #greattimes".

After spells coaching at Bristol City, Tranmere Rovers, Oldham Athletic and Southport, Russell came out of retirement and played for Shepton Mallet and Bristol Manor Farm before emigrating to Australia and started coaching at Jamie Gosling's football academy in Cairns while also turning out for Stratford Dolphins at the age of 46. In 2020, he moved to another FNQ Football league side Leichhardt Lions in a dual player/assistant coach role, and won the FNQ Football Men's Premier Player of the Year award in 2021 – aged 48.

== Honours ==
Individual

- PFA Team of the Year: 2002–03 Third Division, 2003–04 Third Division
