= Scottish Public Services Ombudsman =

UK government agency

Agency overview
- Formed: 23 October 2002
- Jurisdiction: Scotland
- Headquarters: Edinburgh
- Employees: 96 (2023/24)
- Agency executive: Andrew Crawford, Acting Ombudsman
- Website: www.spso.org.uk

The Scottish Public Services Ombudsman (SPSO) is the organisation that handles complaints about public services in Scotland.

The Ombudsman service is independent of government and has a duty to act impartially. It has four statutory functions: investigating complaints about most devolved public services in Scotland; setting and supporting complaints-handling standards; independently reviewing decisions on applications to the Scottish Welfare Fund; and acting as the Independent National Whistleblowing Officer for the NHS in Scotland.

== Services ==
The SPSO is responsible for looking at complaints made by individual members of the Scottish public about most organisations providing public services in Scotland including councils, the National Health Service, housing associations, the Scottish Government and its agencies and directorates, universities and colleges, prisons and most Scottish public authorities.

The SPSO examines complaints where a member of the public claims to have suffered injustice or hardship as a result of maladministration or service failure. The SPSO is the 'last resort'; investigating cases after the complainant has already exhausted the formal complaints procedure of the organisation concerned.

The SPSO also shares learning from its work to improve service delivery across the public services spectrum in Scotland. The office carries out awareness-raising activities with the general public, and bodies under jurisdiction and promotes good complaints handling by public service providers in Scotland. The SPSO has a separate website to support best practice in complaints handling.

== History ==
On 23 October 2002 the ombudsman service, headed by the Scottish Public Services Ombudsman, was established by the Scottish Public Services Ombudsman Act 2002. This Act of the Scottish Parliament outlines the Ombudsman's role and terms of appointment. The legislation established the ombudsman as a 'one-stop-shop' assuming statutory duties that had previously been the remit of three previous offices – the Scottish Parliamentary Ombudsman, the Health Service Ombudsman, the Local Government Ombudsman for Scotland. It also took over non-statutory duties from the Housing Association Ombudsman for Scotland. The first Scottish Public Services Ombudsman was Professor Alice Brown.

== Process ==
Complaints can be taken to the Ombudsman service once a person has gone through the complaints process of an organisation that comes under SPSO's jurisdiction. Most organisations have a formal complaints procedure that afford them an opportunity to resolve the complaint. An aggrieved member of the public must usually write to the body concerned to explain their dissatisfaction and how they wish their complaint to be resolved. A response should be issued within a specific time frame. Some organisations will have more than one stage in their complaints procedure so there may be a series of responses between the complainant and the body before reaching the end of the process. The final response from the organisation should contain an explanation that the complainant can contact the SPSO.

Complaints arrive at the SPSO in the form of letters, emails, complaint forms and by phone. The SPSO receives large numbers of enquiries and complaints which are not within its remit or not ready for it to look at – in these cases, members of the public are directed to the appropriate body or Ombudsman service.

The SPSO Act 2002 states the Ombudsman's powers, outlining what the Ombudsman can and cannot do. The Act stipulates that certain requirements must be met before it can investigate a complaint.

The Ombudsman's service incurs no charge. The SPSO is not a watchdog or a regulator – their role is to give an independent and impartial decision on a complaint.

Reports of investigations that are laid before the Scottish Parliament are sent to the complainant, the body complained about and Scottish Ministers. The Ombudsman may make recommendations to the body to address failings identified in the investigation. The recommendations may be designed to provide redress to the individual complaint (for example, an explanation, an apology or re-imbursement of costs incurred as a result of the organisation's fault), or to improve general working practices within the organisation (for example, a change in procedure). The Ombudsman accompanies the reports laid before the Parliament with a monthly commentary, which summarises the reports and highlights any issues or trends to which the Ombudsman wishes to draw attention.

== Appointment of the Ombudsman ==
The acting Scottish Public Services Ombudsman is Andrew Ctrawford who covered the post between the appointment of Rosemary Agnew and her successor Paul McFadden The Ombudsman is appointed by Her Majesty, on the nomination of the Scottish Parliament, for a period not exceeding five years. The Ombudsman is eligible for a second term but re-appointment for a third term is allowed only if desirable in the public interest due to special circumstances. The Ombudsman may be relieved of office by Her Majesty upon request or following a resolution of the Scottish Parliament which, if passed on a division, must be voted for by at least two-thirds of members.

== Accountability ==
The Ombudsman remains independent from the bodies which they investigate. To safeguard the independence of the SPSO, under the provisions of the Scottish Public Services Ombudsman Act 2002, in the exercise of the SPSO's statutory functions, the SPSO is not subject to the direction or control of any member of the Scottish Government or the Scottish Parliament. The SPSO is a member of the Ombudsman Association.

The Scottish Parliament pays the salary and expenses of the Ombudsman and any expenses incurred in the exercise of the Ombudsman's function. The Ombudsman is accountable to the Scottish Parliament and must lay an annual report and their investigation reports before the Parliament.

== Powers ==
If an investigation finds maladministration, which it won't properly define, or service failure, the Ombudsman may make recommendations to redress problems identified. Organisations do not have to comply with the SPSO's recommendations and are not bound by the law to do so. If an organisation failed to implement recommendations the Ombudsman could, but in most cases won't, lay a 'special' report before the Scottish Parliament highlighting any concerns, which effectively makes the SPSO a toothless organisation with no real powers.

The ombudsman has powers to investigate universities.

== Working with other organisations ==
In 2013 the SPSO worked with NHS Education for Scotland to develop complaints handling training materials for NHS staff. The SPSO worked closely with Healthcare Improvement Scotland (HIS), taking part in their working group looking at new guidance for adverse incident reviews.

In August 2023, BetterCareScotland reported that the SPSO has been asked to investigate claims that Care Inspectorate inspection processes routinely fail to identify and, therefore, address risk-taking by care providers or recognise the indicators of "closed cultures" in the sector and stonewalls serious complaints about the Care Inspectorate's operations.

== See also ==
- Standards Commission for Scotland
- Northern Ireland Public Services Ombudsman
- Public Services Ombudsman for Wales
- Parliamentary Commissioner for Standards
- Parliamentary and Health Service Ombudsman
