= 1924 in Scotland =

- Centuries: 18th; 19th; 20th; 21st
- Decades: 1900s; 1910s; 1920s; 1930s; 1940s
- See also: List of years in Scotland; Timeline of Scottish history 1924 in: The UK • Wales • Elsewhere; Scottish football: 1923–24 • 1924–25

Events from the year 1924 in Scotland.

== Incumbents ==
- Secretary for Scotland and Keeper of the Great Seal – The Viscount Novar until 22 January; then William Adamson until 3 November; then Sir John Gilmour, Bt

=== Law officers ===
- Lord Advocate – William Watson until February; then Hugh Pattison Macmillan until November; then William Watson
- Solicitor General for Scotland – Frederick Thomson; then John Charles Fenton until November; then David Fleming

=== Judiciary ===
- Lord President of the Court of Session and Lord Justice General – Lord Clyde
- Lord Justice Clerk – Lord Alness
- Chairman of the Scottish Land Court – Lord St Vigeans

== Events ==
- 22 January – Ramsay MacDonald becomes the first Labour Prime Minister of the United Kingdom, leading a minority government.
- 28–30 January – Curling at the 1924 Winter Olympics: The gold medal is won by a Scottish team representing Great Britain in Chamonix.
- April – The Scots Magazine resumes publication in Glasgow under this title.
- 3 June – Gleneagles Hotel, in Perthshire, is opened by the London, Midland and Scottish Railway.
- 11 July – Eric Liddell wins 400m gold at the 1924 Summer Olympics in Paris in a new world-record time of 47.6 seconds.
- 28 July – At Edinburgh Haymarket railway station, a passenger train ignores a stop signal and collides with a second train; five people are killed.
- 15 December – The Scottish county of Linlithgowshire is officially renamed West Lothian (the Act comes into effect in 1925).
- Duncansby Head lighthouse, engineered by David Alan Stevenson, is established.
- The London and North Eastern Railway officially names its Flying Scotsman express train, although the 10.00 a.m. service from London King's Cross to Edinburgh Waverley over the East Coast Main Line has previously been known by this title, and has operated since 1862.
- Annandale distillery closed.

== Births ==
- 29 January – Bobby Combe, international footballer (died 1991)
- 7 March – Eduardo Paolozzi, artist (died 2005 in London)
- 11 March – Anne Macaulay, musicologist, author and lecturer (died 1998)
- 20 March – James Barr, biblical scholar (died 2006 in Claremont, California)
- 28 March – Robert James, actor (died 2004 in England)
- 3 April – Murray Dickie, tenor opera singer and director (died 1995 in South Africa)
- 13 April – Sammy Cox, international footballer (died 2015 in Canada)
- 14 April – Robert Stewart, textile designer (died 1995)
- 15 April – Rikki Fulton, comedian (died 2004)
- 18 April – Buxton Orr, composer (died 1997)
- 20 May – Stan Paterson, glaciologist (died 2013 in Canada)
- 25 May – Gordon Smith, football player, the only player to win a Scottish league championship with three clubs, Hibernian, Heart of Midlothian and Dundee (died 2004)
- 1 June – Rev. Professor Alexander Campbell Cheyne, scholar of Church history (died 2006)
- 9 June – Peter Heatly, diver (died 2015)
- 14 June
  - James Black, pharmacologist, recipient of the Nobel Prize in Physiology or Medicine (died 2010 in London)
  - John Grieve, actor (died 2003)
- 17 June – Archibald Hall, serial killer and thief (died 2002 in HM Prison Kingston)
- 19 July – Sir James Fraser, surgeon (died 1997 in England)
- 15 September – Piers Mackesy, military historian (died 2014)
- 6 October – Margaret Fulton, cookery writer in Australia (died 2019)

== Deaths ==
- 3 February – Major General William Burney Bannerman, military surgeon (born 1858)
- 6 February – Sir John Stewart, 1st Baronet, of Fingask, whisky distiller (born 1877; suicide)
- 17 April – James Brown Craven, ecclesiastical historian (born 1850)
- 27 April – James Salmon, architect (born 1873)
- 22 June – William Macewen, pioneer in brain surgery (born 1837)
- 26 July – William Robert Ogilvie-Grant, ornithologist (born 1863)
- 4 September – Constance Gordon-Cumming, travel writer and painter (born 1848)
- 17 October – Hector C. Macpherson, writer and journalist (born 1851)
- 24 November – Peter Milne, missionary to the New Hebrides (born 1834)
- 31 December – James Gardiner, Liberal MP (born 1860)
- John Henderson, painter (born 1860)

== The arts ==
- April – French-born critic Denis Saurat publishes "Le groupe de la Renaissance Écossaise" in Revue Anglo-Américaine bringing writers of the modern Scottish Renaissance to wider European notice.

== See also ==
- Timeline of Scottish history
- 1924 in Northern Ireland
