= 1937 in Scotland =

- Centuries: 18th; 19th; 20th; 21st
- Decades: 1910s; 1920s; 1930s; 1940s; 1950s
- See also: List of years in Scotland; Timeline of Scottish history 1937 in: The UK • Wales • Elsewhere; Scottish football: 1936–37 • 1937–38

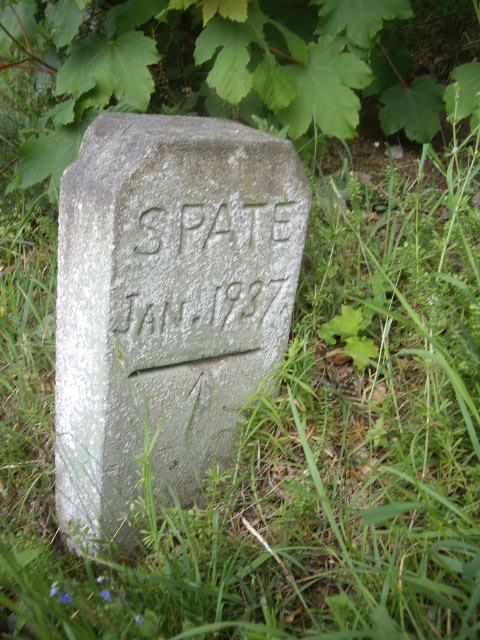
High Water Level marker by the Dee Recording the level reached by floodwater in the spate of January 1937.

Events from the year 1937 in Scotland.

== Incumbents ==
- Secretary of State for Scotland and Keeper of the Great Seal – Walter Elliot

=== Law officers ===
- Lord Advocate – Thomas Mackay Cooper
- Solicitor General for Scotland – James Reid

=== Judiciary ===
- Lord President of the Court of Session and Lord Justice General – Lord Normand
- Lord Justice Clerk – Lord Aitchison
- Chairman of the Scottish Land Court – Lord MacGregor Mitchell

== Events ==
- 17 April – A crowd of 149,415 spectators officially (and at least 20,000 more unofficially) watch the Scotland national football team defeat England 3-1 at Hampden Park, Glasgow, an all-time European record for an international match.
- 5 July – The rival operators of the East and West Coast Main Line railway routes between London and Scotland introduce streamlined express passenger trains hauled by steam locomotives: the London and North Eastern Railway's The Coronation between London King's Cross and Edinburgh Waverley and the London, Midland and Scottish Railway's Coronation Scot between Euston and Glasgow Central.
- 16 September – 10 young Irish potato harvesters are killed in a bothy fire at Kirkintilloch.
- 16 October – Jimmy McGrory plays his last match with Celtic F.C., achieving a United Kingdom record of 550 goals scored during his senior career.
- 4 December – The first issue of children's comic The Dandy, including the character Desperate Dan, is published by Dundee-based publisher D. C. Thomson & Co.
- 10 December – Castlecary rail crash: an express on the Edinburgh to Glasgow line collides into the rear of a local train standing at Castlecary in the snow, due primarily to a signalman's error; thirty-five people are killed.
- Hydroelectricity scheme of Galloway Water Power Company commences operation.
- Nigel Nicolson purchases the uninhabited Shiant Isles from fellow writer Compton Mackenzie.
- The National Trust for Scotland acquires its first part of the site of the Battle of Culloden.
- Among the definitive coins of the United Kingdom issued for the new reign are shillings carrying a Scottish crest.
- A. G. Macdonell publishes My Scotland.

== Births ==
- 3 February – Alex Young, footballer (died 2017)
- 10 February – Anne Anderson, physiologist (died 1983)
- 16 February – Jimmy Frizzell, footballer and football manager (died 2016)
- 6 April – Angus Grossart, businessman (died 2022)
- 8 April – Claire Nielson, actress
- 18 April – Teddy Taylor, Conservative politician (died 2017)
- 28 April – Jean Redpath, folk singer (died 2014 in the United States)
- 6 May – Robin Fulton, poet and translator
- 7 July – Sheila Stewart, folk singer (died 2014)
- 21 August – Donald Dewar, Labour politician and First Minister of Scotland (died 2000)
- 24 August – George Kerr judo expert
- 3 September – Willie Bell, footballer (died 2023)
- 4 October – Jim Sillars, politician
- 9 October – Fiona Cumming, television director (died 2015)
- 15 November – Ron Yeats, footballer (died 2024)
- 18 November – Colette O'Neil, actress (died 2021)
- 21 December
  - Jimmy Collins, footballer (died 2018)
  - Sheila Reid, actress
- date unknown
  - James Goodfellow, inventor
  - Kate Macintosh, architect
  - Dorothy Paul, actress

== Deaths ==
- 6 January – Robert Urie, steam locomotive engineer (born 1854)
- 21 February – Wallace Lindsay, classical scholar (born 1858)
- 23 February – John Begg, architect, who practised in London, South Africa and India (born 1866)
- 10 April – Ernest Auldjo Jamieson, architect (born 1880)
- 21 May – Sir Alexander Grant, 1st Baronet, biscuit manufacturer and philanthropist (born 1864)
- 19 June – J. M. Barrie, author best remembered as the creator of Peter Pan (born 1860; died in London)
- 28 July – Sir William Younger, 1st Baronet, of Auchen Castle, politician (born 1862)
- 21 September – Chrystal Macmillan, mathematician, suffragist, politician, barrister and pacifist (born 1872)
- 30 October – Sir Herbert Maxwell, novelist, essayist, artist, antiquarian, horticulturalist and Conservative politician (born 1845)
- 8 November – Alasdair Tayler, historical writer (born 1870)
- 9 November – Ramsay MacDonald, Labour politician and Prime Minister of the United Kingdom (born 1866; died at sea)
- 6 December – Francis Cadell, Colourist painter (born 1883)
- John Stevenson Rhind, sculptor (born 1859)

== The arts ==
- August – the film The Edge of the World is released. Directed by Michael Powell, it dramatises the depopulation of the Scottish islands (based on the evacuation of St Kilda in 1930) and was largely filmed on Foula in Shetland.
- A. J. Cronin's medical novel The Citadel is published.
- Neil M. Gunn's novel Highland River is published in Edinburgh and becomes the first work of fiction to win the Saltire Society's Scottish Book of the Year award.
- Robert McLellan's play Jamie the Saxt is first performed, in Glasgow, starring Duncan Macrae.

== See also ==
- Timeline of Scottish history
- 1987 in Northern Ireland
