= 1930 in Scotland =

- Centuries: 18th; 19th; 20th; 21st
- Decades: 1910s; 1920s; 1930s; 1940s; 1950s
- See also: List of years in Scotland; Timeline of Scottish history 1930 in: The UK • Wales • Elsewhere; Scottish football: 1929–30 • 1930–31

Events from the year 1930 in Scotland.

== Incumbents ==
- Secretary of State for Scotland and Keeper of the Great Seal – William Adamson

=== Law officers ===
- Lord Advocate – Craigie Mason Aitchison
- Solicitor General for Scotland – John Charles Watson

=== Judiciary ===
- Lord President of the Court of Session and Lord Justice General – Lord Clyde
- Lord Justice Clerk – Lord Alness
- Chairman of the Scottish Land Court – Lord St Vigeans

== Events ==
- 10 April – Shetland ferry SS St. Sunniva runs aground on Mousa and is lost.
- 30 April – first section of the 132kV AC National Grid, the Central Scotland Electricity Scheme, is switched on in Edinburgh.
- 16 May – Local Government (Scotland) Act 1929 comes into effect. Parish councils and Commissioners of Supply are dissolved and other local government units reconstituted, merged or abolished. In policy matters, the counties of Perthshire and Kinross-shire, and of Moray and Nairnshire, are to act jointly.
- 11 June – transatlantic liner RMS Empress of Britain is launched at John Brown & Company's shipyard at Clydebank for the Canadian Pacific Steamship Company.
- 8 July – first official demonstration of the Bennie Railplane at Milngavie.
- 29 August – remaining inhabitants of Hirta in the St Kilda archipelago are voluntarily evacuated to Morvern on the mainland. Boreray sheep are left to become feral animals.
- Formation of the Scottish Party by members of the Unionist Party favouring establishment of a Dominion Scottish Parliament.
- Rosemary Bank is discovered approximately 120 km west of Scotland by survey vessel HMS Rosemary.
- Dysart, Fife, amalgamated into Kirkcaldy.

== Births ==
- 4 January – Iain Cuthbertson, actor (died 2009)
- 27 January – John Higgins, footballer (died 2017)
- 16 February – John Cairney, actor
- 3 March – John Howard Wilson, rugby union player (died 2015)
- 5 March – Isla Cameron, actress and folk singer (died 1980)
- 10 March – Jimmie Macgregor, folk singer
- 18 April – Angus Lennie, actor (died 2014 in England)
- 1 May – Una McLean, actress
- 4 May – Lois de Banzie, actress (died 2021 in the United States)
- 10 June – Hastie Weir, goalkeeper (died 1999)
- 26 June – Jimmy Deuchar, jazz trumpeter (died 1993)
- 3 July – Robert Robertson, actor (died 2001)
- 7 July – Hamish MacInnes, mountaineer, mountain search and rescuer, author and advisor (died 2020)
- 8 July – Bob Crampsey, historian, author and broadcaster (died 2008)
- 9 July – Richard Demarco artist and promoter of the visual and performing arts
- 25 July – Annie Ross, born Annabelle Allan Short, jazz singer (born in London; died 2020 in the United States)
- 27 July – Andy White, session drummer (died 2015 in the United States)
- 12 August – Stan Greig, pianist, drummer and bandleader (died 2012 in London)
- 21 August – Princess Margaret (died 2002)
- 25 August – Sean Connery, film actor (died 2020 in The Bahamas)
- 13 November – Helena Carroll, actress (died 2013 in the United States)
- 13 November – Adrienne Corri, actress (died 2016 in London)
- 4 December – Ronnie Corbett, comic actor (died 2016 in England)
- Mardi Barrie, artist and teacher, (died 2004)
- James Kennedy, security guard, posthumously awarded the George Cross (killed 1973)

== Deaths ==
- 8 January – Hughie Ferguson, footballer, by suicide (born 1895)
- 24 March – Henry Faulds, physician, missionary and scientist noted for the development of fingerprinting (born 1843)
- 30 March – James Hoey Craigie, architect, (born 1870)
- 28 April – Murdoch Cameron, Regius Professor of Obstetrics and Gynaecology at the University of Glasgow from 1894 to 1926 (born 1847)
- 12 May – John Wheatley, socialist politician (born 1869 in Ireland)
- 7 July – Sir Arthur Conan Doyle, author, in England (born 1859)
- 6 September – James Guthrie, painter (born 1859)
- 13 October – Sydney Mitchell, architect (born 1856)
- 22 November – Marjory Kennedy-Fraser, singer, composer and music teacher (born 1857)
- 4 December – Thomas Ross, architect (born 1839)
- 19 December – William Crozier, landscape painter (born 1893)
- 22 December – Neil Munro, writer (born 1863)

== The arts ==
- 11 September – English detective fiction writer Agatha Christie marries her second husband, archaeologist Max Mallowan, in Edinburgh.
- Catherine Carswell's The Life of Robert Burns is published, attracting criticism for its frank portrayal of the poet's life.
- Erik Chisholm's Piano Concerto No. 1, Piobaireachd, is composed.
- Nan Shepherd's novel The Weatherhouse is published.
- Hugh MacDiarmid's To Circumjack Cencrastus is published.

== See also ==
- Timeline of Scottish history
- 1930 in Northern Ireland
