= 1839 in Scotland =

- Centuries: 17th; 18th; 19th; 20th; 21st
- Decades: 1810s; 1820s; 1830s; 1840s; 1850s
- See also: List of years in Scotland; Timeline of Scottish history 1839 in: The UK • Wales • Elsewhere

Events from the year 1839 in Scotland.

== Incumbents ==
=== Law officers ===
- Lord Advocate – John Murray until April; then Andrew Rutherfurd
- Solicitor General for Scotland – Andrew Rutherfurd; then James Ivory

=== Judiciary ===
- Lord President of the Court of Session and Lord Justice General – Lord Granton
- Lord Justice Clerk – Lord Boyle

== Events ==
- January – the first parallax measurement of the distance to Alpha Centauri is published by Thomas Henderson.
- 29 May – Mungo Ponton presents his discovery of the light-sensitive quality of sodium dichromate as a method of permanent photography.
- 10 June – Major Chartist meeting on Glasgow Green.
- 15 June – David Clark, the first emigrant ship to sail directly from Great Britain to Port Phillip sets out from Greenock under the command of Capt. J. B. Mills, with mainly Scots assisted immigrants, arriving in Australia on 27 October.
- 15 July – first clipper ship launched in Britain, the schooner Scottish Maid at Alexander Hall's yard in Aberdeen.
- August – National Chartist organisation set up in Scotland.
- 30 August – the Eglinton Tournament, a recreation of a medieval tourney, takes place at Eglinton Castle, North Ayrshire.
- October – earthquakes across Scotland.
- City of Glasgow Bank established.
- James Templeton's textile company is established at Bridgeton, Glasgow.
- Consumer cooperatives established in Galashiels and Hawick, predecessors of the Lothian, Borders & Angus Co-operative Society.
- Decision of the House of Lords on appeal in the Auchterarder case that the General Assembly of the Church of Scotland's Veto Act of 1835 is invalid.
- George Murray, 6th Duke of Atholl, revives the Atholl Highlanders as a personal bodyguard.
- Scottish Society for Prevention of Cruelty to Animals established in Edinburgh.
- Roderick Murchison publishes The Silurian System.
- Claimed invention of the rear-wheel driven bicycle by Kirkpatrick Macmillan.

== Births ==
- 4 January – Anne Jane Cupples, née Douglas, writer (died 1896)
- 13 February – William Arrol, civil engineering contractor (died 1913)
- 17 March – John Pettie, painter (died 1893)
- 26 March – John Mackay, pioneer in Australia (died 1914 in Australia)
- 4 April – James Blyth, electrical engineer (died 1906)
- 18 April – Donald MacKinnon, Celtic scholar (died 1914)
- 7 May – Joseph Hunter, surveyor, civil engineer and politician in British Columbia (died 1935 in Canada)
- 10 June – James Cleland, merchant and politician in Ontario (died 1908 in Canada)
- 17 May – Alexander Davidson, architect in Australia (died 1908 in Australia)
- 23 August – James Geikie, geologist (died 1915)
- 8 September – John Aitken, meteorologist (died 1919)
- 21 October – Joseph Tait, businessman and politician in Ontario (died 1911 in Canada)
- 30 October – Flora Stevenson, social reformer (died 1905)
- 3 November – Aeneas James George Mackay, lawyer and historian (died 1911)
- 17 November – David Farquharson, landscape painter (died 1907)
- 18 December – William Grant, whisky distiller (died 1923)
- 26 December – Selina Murray McDonald Sutherland, nurse and social reformer in Australasia (died 1909 in Australia)
- James Caldwell, politician (died 1925)
- Arthur Lloyd, music hall entertainer (died 1904)
- Charles Macintosh, folk music composer and performer and mycologist (died 1922)
- Alexander Provand, Liberal politician (died 1915)
- James Galloway Weir, businessman and Liberal politician (died 1911)

== Deaths ==
- 22 January – Christian Ramsay, Lady Dalhousie, botanist (born 1786)
- 17 February – William Adam of Blair Adam, lawyer (born 1751)
- 11 April – John Galt, novelist and entrepreneur (born 1779)
- 17 May – Archibald Alison, Episcopalian minister and writer (born 1757)
- 7 September – Sir Andrew Halliday, physician (born 1782)
- 21 September – James Mylne, philosopher (born 1757)

== See also ==
- 1839 in Ireland
