= 1912 in Scotland =

- Centuries: 18th; 19th; 20th; 21st
- Decades: 1890s; 1900s; 1910s; 1920s; 1930s
- See also: List of years in Scotland; Timeline of Scottish history 1912 in: The UK • Wales • Elsewhere; Scottish football: 1911–12 • 1912–13

Events from the year 1912 in Scotland.

== Incumbents ==
- Secretary for Scotland and Keeper of the Great Seal – John Sinclair, 1st Baron Pentland until 13 February; then Thomas McKinnon Wood

=== Law officers ===
- Lord Advocate – Alexander Ure
- Solicitor General for Scotland – Andrew Anderson

=== Judiciary ===
- Lord President of the Court of Session and Lord Justice General – Lord Dunedin
- Lord Justice Clerk – Lord Kingsburgh
- Chairman of the Scottish Land Court, established on 1 April – Lord Kennedy

== Events ==
- 15 January – Rua Reidh Lighthouse first lit on Rubh'Re Point near the entrance to Loch Ewe.
- May – Unionist Party emerges in Scotland following merger of the Liberal Unionist Party into the Conservative And Unionist Party in England.
- Summer – The last residents leave the Hebridean isle of Mingulay.
- August – Sir Fitzroy Maclean, 10th Baronet, takes possession of the family seat of Duart Castle on the Isle of Mull.
- 10 September – Midlothian by-election. The Unionist Party gain the seat from the Liberal Party.
- 24 October – Formation of the Edinburgh and Leith Branch of the Workers' Educational Association at a meeting addressed by Albert Mansbridge.
- 26 November – A severe south-westerly gale hits Scotland: ten people are killed and Troon is heavily flooded.
- The island of Raasay is acquired by Baird & Co. who open an iron ore mine there.

== Births ==
- 1 January – Margot Bennett, novelist (died 1980)
- 10 February – Ena Lamont Stewart, playwright (died 2006)
- 15 February – Jane Lee, silent film child actor (possible location) (died 1957 in New York City)
- 17 March – Alex Hastings, international footballer (died 1988)
- 10 April – Archie McKellar, squadron leader, flying ace of the Royal Air Force during World War II (killed in action 1940 over Adisham, Kent)
- 16 April – David Langton, born Basil Muir Langton-Dodds, actor (died 1994 in Stratford-upon-Avon)
- 18 April – Sir Sandy Glen, explorer of the Arctic and wartime intelligence officer (died 2004)
- 10 May – Mary Anne MacLeod Trump, mother of President of the United States Donald Trump (died 2000 in New York City)
- 3 June – William Douglas-Home, playwright (died 1992 in England)
- 15 August – Sir Monty Finniston, industrialist (died 1991 in London)
- 2 September – David Daiches, literary historian and literary critic (died 2005)
- 11 September – Robin Jenkins, novelist (died 2005)
- 12 September – J. F. Hendry, poet (died 1986 in Canada)
- 21 September – Sir Ian MacGregor, industrialist (died 1998 in England)
- 29 November – Muriel Gibson, Scottish nationalist activist and military officer (died 2005)
- 1 December – Margaret Campbell, Duchess of Argyll, née Whigham, socialite (died 1993 in England)

== Deaths ==
- 18 February – George Henderson, scholar of Scottish Gaelic (born 1866)
- 29 March – Henry Robertson Bowers, polar explorer (born 1883)
- 15 April – Wreck of the RMS Titanic
  - John Law Hume, violinist on RMS Titanic (born 1890)
  - William McMaster Murdoch, First Officer on RMS Titanic (born 1873)
- 6 June – Alexander Carmichael, exciseman, folklorist, antiquarian and author (born 1832)
- 20 July – Andrew Lang, poet, novelist, literary critic and contributor to anthropology (born 1844)
- 8 November – Dugald Drummond, steam locomotive engineer (born 1840)
- 25 November – Sir Edward Moss, theatrical impresario (born 1852 in Manchester)
- 18 December – Alexander Taylor Innes, lawyer, writer, biographer and church historian (born 1833)

== The arts ==
- The Hippodrome Cinema, Bo'ness, opens its doors. It will be the first purpose-built cinema in Scotland to celebrate its centenary as a film venue.
- Bandmaster Frederick J. Ricketts of the Argyll and Sutherland Highlanders publishes "Holyrood", the first march under the pseudonym Kenneth J. Alford.

== See also ==
- Timeline of Scottish history
- 1912 in Ireland
