= 1918 in Scotland =

- Centuries: 18th; 19th; 20th; 21st
- Decades: 1890s; 1900s; 1910s; 1920s; 1930s
- See also: List of years in Scotland; Timeline of Scottish history 1918 in: The UK • Wales • Elsewhere; Scottish football: 1917–18 • 1918–19

Events from the year 1918 in Scotland.

== Incumbents ==
- Secretary for Scotland and Keeper of the Great Seal – Robert Munro

=== Law officers ===
- Lord Advocate – James Avon Clyde
- Solicitor General for Scotland – Thomas Brash Morison

=== Judiciary ===
- Lord President of the Court of Session and Lord Justice General – Lord Strathclyde
- Lord Justice Clerk – Lord Dickson
- Chairman of the Scottish Land Court – Lord Kennedy until 12 February; vacant until 2 May; then Lord St Vigeans

== Events ==
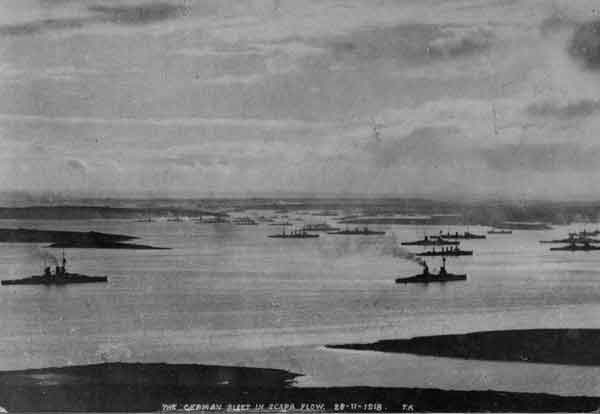
The German fleet interned in Scapa Flow, November 1918

- 12 January – Admiralty M-class destroyers HMS Narborough (1916) (Clydebuilt) and HMS Opal (1915) run aground and are wrecked off South Ronaldsay in a severe storm with only one survivor.
- 31 January – "Battle of May Island": In a confused series of collisions as a large Royal Navy fleet steams down the Firth of Forth this evening, submarines HMS K4 and HMS K17 are sunk, three other submarines and a light cruiser are damaged and 104 men are killed.
- 5 February – World War I: Imperial German Navy submarine SM UB-77 torpedoes troopship SS Tuscania (1914) off Islay with 210 men, mostly United States troops, lost.
- 11 February – American Dreadnought battleship USS Texas joins the British Grand Fleet in Scapa Flow.
- May – English industrialist William Lever, Baron Leverhulme, buys the Isle of Lewis.
- 15 May – World War I: Imperial German Navy submarine SM U-90 shells the Royal Navy wireless station on Hirta in St Kilda.
- 29 June – Airship R27, built by William Beardmore and Company at Inchinnan (Renfrewshire), is commissioned.
- 22 August – HMS Hood (51) is launched by John Brown & Company at their Clydebank shipyard. The last battlecruiser built for the Royal Navy, she will be in commission from 1920 to 1941.
- 6 October – troopship HMS Otranto is wrecked after a collision off Islay with 351 United States troops and 80 crew lost.
- 5 November – Clydebuilt former Cunarder HMS Campania sinks in an accident in the Firth of Forth.
- 11 November – World War I is ended by Armistice at Compiègne, with Admiral Sir Rosslyn Wemyss as British representative. The War has seen Scottish losses of around 102,500 men born in Scotland from 680,000 serving in the British armed forces; there is no parish in Scotland without a loss.
- 21 November – Education (Scotland) Act. Local education authorities replace school boards.
- 25–27 November – the surrendered German High Seas Fleet steams from a rendezvous in the Firth of Forth to internment in Scapa Flow.
- The Scottish county of Elginshire is officially renamed as the County of Moray (Morayshire).
- A farm at Arabella in Easter Ross is set aside as smallholdings for returning servicemen.

== Births ==
- 1 January – Albert McQuarrie, Conservative politician and building contractor (died 2016)
- 3 February – Moira Dunbar, glaciologist (died 1999 in Canada)
- 1 February – Muriel Spark, novelist (died 2006 in Italy)
- 8 March – Eileen Herlie, actress (died 2008 in New York City)
- 1 May – James Copeland, actor (died 2002 in London)
- 11 May – Sheila Burnford, writer on Canada (died 1984 in England)
- 28 May – Jackie Husband, international footballer (died 1992)
- 6 June – Tom Scott, poet (died 1995)
- 28 June – William Whitelaw, Conservative politician (died 1999 in England)
- 30 June – Isobel Barnett, née Marshall, broadcasting personality (suicide 1980 in England)
- 20 July – Fiona Gore, née Colquhoun, powerboat racer (died 2013)
- 21 July – Maurice Lindsay, broadcaster, writer and poet (died 2009)
- 18 September – Captain Douglas Ford, Royal Scots officer, posthumously awarded the George Cross (died 1943 in Big Wave Bay, Hong Kong Island)
- 28 September – Ida Schuster, actress (died 2020)
- 19 November – W. S. Graham, poet (died 1986)

== Deaths ==
- 13 January – Aeneas Chisholm, Roman Catholic Bishop of Aberdeen (born 1836)
- 15 January – Mark Sheridan, music hall performer, probable suicide (born 1864 in England)
- 6 February – John F. McIntosh, steam locomotive engineer (born 1846)
- 12 February – Neil Kennedy, Lord Kennedy, chairman of the Scottish Land Court (born 1854)
- 19 February – Grace Cadell, pioneer physician, surgeon, novelist and militant suffragette (born 1855)
- 26 April – Cecil Coles, composer, killed in action (born 1888)
- 8 June – Robert Farquharson, physician and Liberal politician (born 1836)
- 21 June – Captain Ian Henderson Royal Air Force World War I flying ace, killed in military aviation accident (born 1896)
- 30 June – Peter Drummond, steam locomotive engineer (born 1850)
- 25 September – Henry Dyer, engineer, notable for engineering education in Japan (born 1848)
- 9 November – Peter Lumsden, British Indian Army general (born 1829)
- 26 November – George Coats, 1st Baron Glentanar, cotton manufacturer (born 1849)
- 1 December – Peter Hume Brown, historian and professor (born 1849)
- John Rennie, naval architect (born 1842)
- James Robert Rhind, architect (born 1854)

== The arts ==
- Ewart Alan Mackintosh's poetry War, The Liberator, and Other Pieces is published posthumously.

== See also ==
- Timeline of Scottish history
- 1918 in Ireland
