= 1766 in Scotland =

- Centuries: 16th; 17th; 18th; 19th; 20th
- Decades: 1740s; 1750s; 1760s; 1770s; 1780s
- See also: List of years in Scotland; Timeline of Scottish history 1766 in: Great Britain • Wales • Elsewhere

Events from the year 1766 in Scotland.

== Incumbents ==
=== Law officers ===
- Lord Advocate – Thomas Miller of Glenlee; then James Montgomery
- Solicitor General for Scotland – James Montgomery; then Henry Dundas

=== Judiciary ===
- Lord President of the Court of Session – Lord Arniston, the younger
- Lord Justice General – Duke of Queensberry
- Lord Justice Clerk – Lord Minto, then Lord Barskimming

== Events ==
- 1 January – Charles Edward Stuart ("Bonnie Prince Charlie", "the young Pretender") becomes the new Stuart claimant to the throne of Great Britain as King Charles III and figurehead for Jacobitism, on the death of his father James Francis Edward Stuart in Rome.
- 17 April – James Craig's plan for the New Town, Edinburgh, wins the prize offered by the city council in January.
- 13 June – two soldiers and a civilian found guilty in Aberdeen of theft during an earlier meal riot in Banff are rescued from custody by a mob.
- 28 October – Coldstream Bridge across the River Tweed on the Northumberland border, designed by John Smeaton, is opened to traffic.

== Births ==
- 18 January – Robert Forsyth, topographical writer (died 1845)
- March – Helen Hyslop, domestic servant, a possible mistress and muse of Robert Burns (died 1852)
- 10 April – John Leslie, mathematician and physicist, researcher into radiant heat (died 1832)
- 6 July – Alexander Wilson, ornithologist (died 1813 in the United States)
- 21 July – Thomas Charles Hope, physician and chemist, discoverer of strontium (died 1844)
- 16 August – Carolina Nairne, songwriter (died 1845)
- 29 December – Charles Macintosh, chemist, inventor of a waterproof fabric (died 1843)
- Charles Baird, mechanical engineer (died 1843 in Russia)
- May Cameron, domestic servant, a mistress of Robert Burns
- Jenny Clow ("Clarinda"), domestic servant, a mistress and muse of Robert Burns (died 1792)

== Deaths ==
- 3 September – Archibald Bower, Jesuit historian (born 1686; died in London)
- 1 December – David Scott (of Scotstarvit), politician (born 1689)
- 13 December – Andrew Fletcher, Lord Milton, judge and entrepreneur (born 1692)
- 24 December – James Grainger, surgeon, poet and translator (born c.1721; died in Saint Kitts)
- Robert Maxwell, writer on agriculture (born 1696)
- Approximate date – John Alexander, painter (born 1686)

== See also ==
- Timeline of Scottish history
