= 1913 in Scotland =

- Centuries: 18th; 19th; 20th; 21st
- Decades: 1890s; 1900s; 1910s; 1920s; 1930s
- See also: List of years in Scotland; Timeline of Scottish history 1913 in: The UK • Wales • Elsewhere; Scottish football: 1912–13 • 1913–14

Events from the year 1913 in Scotland.

== Incumbents ==
- Secretary for Scotland and Keeper of the Great Seal – Thomas McKinnon Wood

=== Law officers ===
- Lord Advocate – Alexander Ure; then Robert Munro
- Solicitor General for Scotland – Andrew Anderson; then Thomas Brash Morison

=== Judiciary ===
- Lord President of the Court of Session and Lord Justice General – Lord Dunedin until 14 October; then Lord Strathclyde
- Lord Justice Clerk – Lord Kingsburgh
- Chairman of the Scottish Land Court – Lord Kennedy

== Events ==
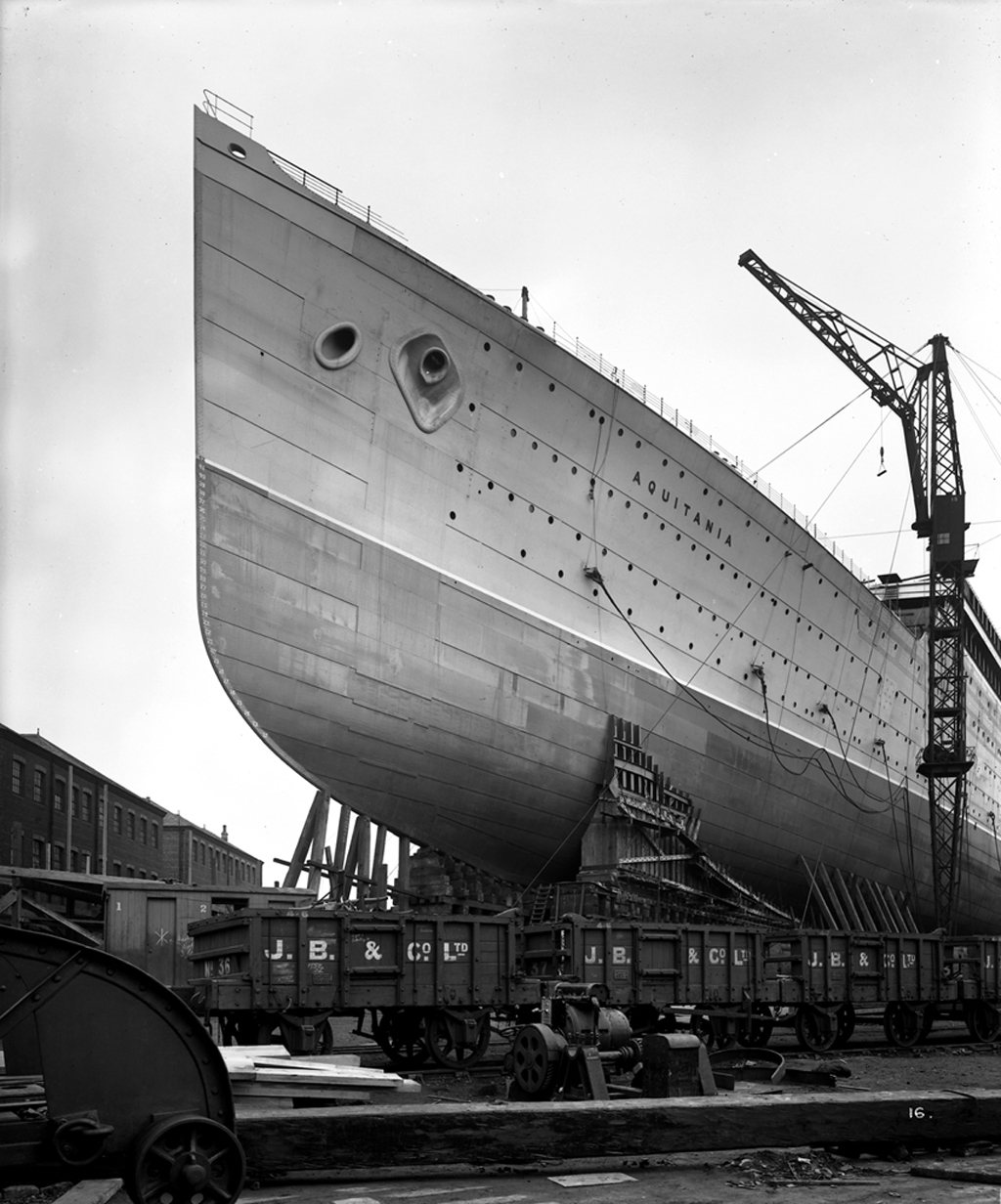
Aquitania shortly before her launch

- 26 February – the Royal Flying Corps establishes the first operational military airfield for fixed-wing aircraft in the United Kingdom at Montrose.
- 21 April – the Cunard ocean liner RMS Aquitania, built by John Brown & Company, is launched on the River Clyde.
- 27 May – Lieutenant Desmond Arthur dies when his Royal Aircraft Factory B.E.2 biplane, 205, collapses without warning while flying over Montrose, Scotland's first fatal aircraft accident.
- 6 June – Stoneyetts Hospital is opened at East Muckcroft (later part of Moodiesburn, North Lanarkshire), originally for the treatment of people with epilepsy.
- 22 July – Edinburgh Zoo opens.
- 3 August – 22 men are killed by fire at Cadder colliery near Bishopbriggs.
- 9 December – An attempt in Turriff to auction the "Turra Coo", a cow seized in lieu of unpaid employer's National Insurance contributions, results in a near-riot.
- Dollar, Clackmannanshire, becomes the first Scottish town to appoint a Lady Provost, Lavinia Malcolm.
- Arrol-Johnston have a purpose-built car factory erected near Dumfries.
- Alexanders' Motor Services, predecessor of W. Alexander & Sons, begins running 'omnibus' services in the Falkirk area from a base in Camelon.
- The Highlands and Islands Medical Service is established in the crofting counties on a non-contributory basis.
- Temperance (Scotland) Act 1913 permits local communities to hold polls (from 1920) on whether prohibition should apply in their districts.
- William Crawford bakes biscuits at Leith.
- The Neolithic site at Skara Brae on Mainland, Orkney, is plundered.
- Coal mining production in Scotland peaks at 43.2 million tonnes, employing over 140,000 men and women, who, with their families, make up 10% of the Scottish population.

== Births ==
- 17 February – Alastair Borthwick, broadcaster and mountaineer (died 2003)
- 6 March – Ella Logan, born Georgina Allan, musical theatre performer (died 1969 in the United States)
- 18 March – W. H. Murray, mountaineer and writer (died 1996)
- 2 April
  - Ronald Center, composer (died 1973)
  - Benny Lynch, flyweight boxer (died 1946)
- 11 April – Winifred Drinkwater, aviator, first woman to hold a commercial pilot's license (died 1996 in New Zealand)
- 13 April – Gordon Donaldson, historian (died 1993)
- 10 May – Alan Gemmell, plant biologist (died 1986)
- 5 June
  - Sam Black, war artist and teacher (died 1997 in Canada)
  - Douglas Young, classicist, poet and Scottish National Party leader (died 1973 in the United States)
- 25 July – John Cairncross, public servant, spy for the Soviet Union, academic and writer (died 1995 in England)
- 29 July – William George Nicholson Geddes, civil engineer (died 1993)
- 29 July – Jo Grimond, Liberal Party (UK) party leader (died 1993)
- 11 August – Andy Beattie, footballer and manager, first manager of the Scotland men's national football team (died 1983)
- 2 September – Bill Shankly, international footballer and manager (died 1981)
- 5 December – Robert MacBryde, still-life and figure painter, and theatre set designer (died 1966 in Dublin)
- 15 December – Robert McIntyre, Scottish National Party leader (died 1998)

== Deaths ==
- 18 January – George Alexander Gibson, physician and geologist (born 1854)
- 9 February – Sir George Reid, artist (born 1841)
- 20 February – Sir William Arrol, civil engineering contractor (born 1839)
- 12 May – William McEwan, Liberal Party MP (1886–1900) and brewer (born 1827)
- 6 September – James Orr, Presbyterian minister, and professor of church history and of theology (born 1844)
- 23 September – James Campbell Noble, painter (born 1832)
- 21 November – James Howden, mechanical engineer (born 1846)

== Arts and literature ==
- 26 May – Campbeltown Picture House (cinema) opens.

== See also ==
- Timeline of Scottish history
- 1913 in the United Kingdom
