= 1928 in Scotland =

- Centuries: 18th; 19th; 20th; 21st
- Decades: 1900s; 1910s; 1920s; 1930s; 1940s
- See also: List of years in Scotland; Timeline of Scottish history 1928 in: The UK • Wales • Elsewhere; Scottish football: 1927–28 • 1928–29

Events from the year 1928 in Scotland.

== Incumbents ==
- Secretary of State for Scotland and Keeper of the Great Seal – Sir John Gilmour, Bt

=== Law officers ===
- Lord Advocate – William Watson
- Solicitor General for Scotland – Alexander Munro MacRobert

=== Judiciary ===
- Lord President of the Court of Session and Lord Justice General – Lord Clyde
- Lord Justice Clerk – Lord Alness
- Chairman of the Scottish Land Court – Lord St Vigeans

== Events ==
- 11 February – formation of the National Party of Scotland, a predecessor the Scottish National Party. On 23 June it holds a demonstration at Stirling marking the anniversary of the Battle of Bannockburn.
- 31 March – the Scotland national football team defeat England 5–1 at Wembley Stadium.
- 28 April – June: Motorcycle speedway racing staged at Celtic Park.
- May
  - The Scottish county of Forfarshire resolves to revert to its historic name of Angus.
  - Carntyne Stadium in Glasgow opened for greyhound racing. Dirt track motorcycle speedway is also staged here, as is the first Scottish Greyhound Derby.
- 1 May – the London and North Eastern Railway's Flying Scotsman steam-hauled express train begins to run non-stop over the 393 miles (632 km) of the East Coast Main Line from London King's Cross to Edinburgh Waverley.
- 18 June – transatlantic liner SS Duchess of Richmond is launched at John Brown & Company's shipyard at Clydebank for Canadian Pacific Steamships.
- 3 July – inventor John Logie Baird demonstrates the world's first colour television transmission in Glasgow.
- 20 July – Scottish Court of Criminal Appeal overturns Oscar Slater's 1909 murder conviction.
- 26 August – in Paisley, May Donoghue finds the remains of a snail in her ginger beer, leading to the landmark negligence case Donoghue v. Stevenson.
- 25 October – a passenger express runs into the rear of a derailed freight train near Dinwoodie railway station with 4 deaths.
- Grampian hydroelectricity scheme initiated.
- First high-voltage electricity pylon for the UK National Grid is erected near Edinburgh.
- Reconstruction of Paisley Abbey completed.
- Politics of Edinburgh: Progressives form a group on the local council.

== Births ==
- 1 January – Iain Crichton Smith, poet (died 1998)
- 17 January – Matt McGinn, folk singer (died 1977)
- 29 February – Irene Sunters, actress (died 2005)
- 10 March – Alex McAvoy, actor (died 2005)
- 11 March – Sandy Mactaggart, Scottish-Canadian educator and philanthropist (died 2017)
- 4 April – Jimmy Logan, born James Allan Short, entertainer (died 2001)
- 24 April – Tommy Docherty, footballer and manager (died 2020 in England)
- 7 April – Gael Turnbull, poet (died 2004)
- 11 April – Duncan Williamson, storyteller and singer (died 2007)
- 22 May – John Mackenzie, film director (died 2011)
- 27 May – Thea Musgrave, classical composer
- 2 June – Calum Kennedy, singer (died 2006)
- 5 June – James Kennaway, novelist and screenwriter (died 1968 in England)
- 29 June – Ian Bannen, actor (died 1999)
- 16 July – Bryden Thomson, orchestral conductor (died 1991 in Ireland)
- 8 August – Peter Keenan, boxer (died 2000)
- 21 September – Con Devitt, Scottish-born New Zealand trade unionist (died 2014)
- 6 October – Flora MacNeil, singer in Scottish Gaelic (died 2015)
- 9 October – Joseph Brady, actor (died 2001 in London)
- 28 October – Lawrie Reilly, international footballer (died 2013)
- 7 December - Kay Matheson, Gaelic scholar and one of four students involved in the 1950 removal of the Stone of Scone (died 2021)
- 11 December – Andy MacMillan, architect (died 2014)
- 27 November – Sir Arnold Clark billionaire car dealer (died 2017)
- 28 December – Ian Steel, road racing cyclist (died 2015)
- John Maxwell Anderson, consultant surgeon (died 1982)

== Deaths ==
- 2 January – Thomas McMillan, footballer (born 1866)
- 14 January – Andrew MacLeish, businessman (born 1838)
- January – Alexander Reid, art dealer (born 1854)
- 13 April – Charles Sims, painter (born 1873 in England; suicide)
- 26 May – John Burnet, classicist (born 1863)
- 28 May – Sir James William Beeman Hodsdon, Scottish surgeon, president of the Royal College of Surgeons of Edinburgh, (born 1858)
- 26 August – Colin Campbell, film director (born 1859)
- 29 October – John Macintyre, laryngologist and pioneer radiographer (born 1857)
- 13 November – Alexander William Mair, academic (born 1875; house fire)
- 10 December – Charles Rennie Mackintosh, architect, designer and watercolourist (born 1868; died in London)
- 24 December – Thomas Corsan Morton, painter (born 1859)

== The arts ==
- The Fife Miner Players begin to tour Joe Corrie's play In Time o' Strife, concerning the effect of the 1926 United Kingdom general strike in the Fife Coalfield.
- Nan Shepherd's first novel The Quarry Wood is published.

== See also ==
- Timeline of Scottish history
- 1928 in Northern Ireland
