= 1929 in Scotland =

- Centuries: 18th; 19th; 20th; 21st
- Decades: 1900s; 1910s; 1920s; 1930s; 1940s
- See also: List of years in Scotland; Timeline of Scottish history 1929 in: The UK • Wales • Elsewhere; Scottish football: 1928–29 • 1929–30

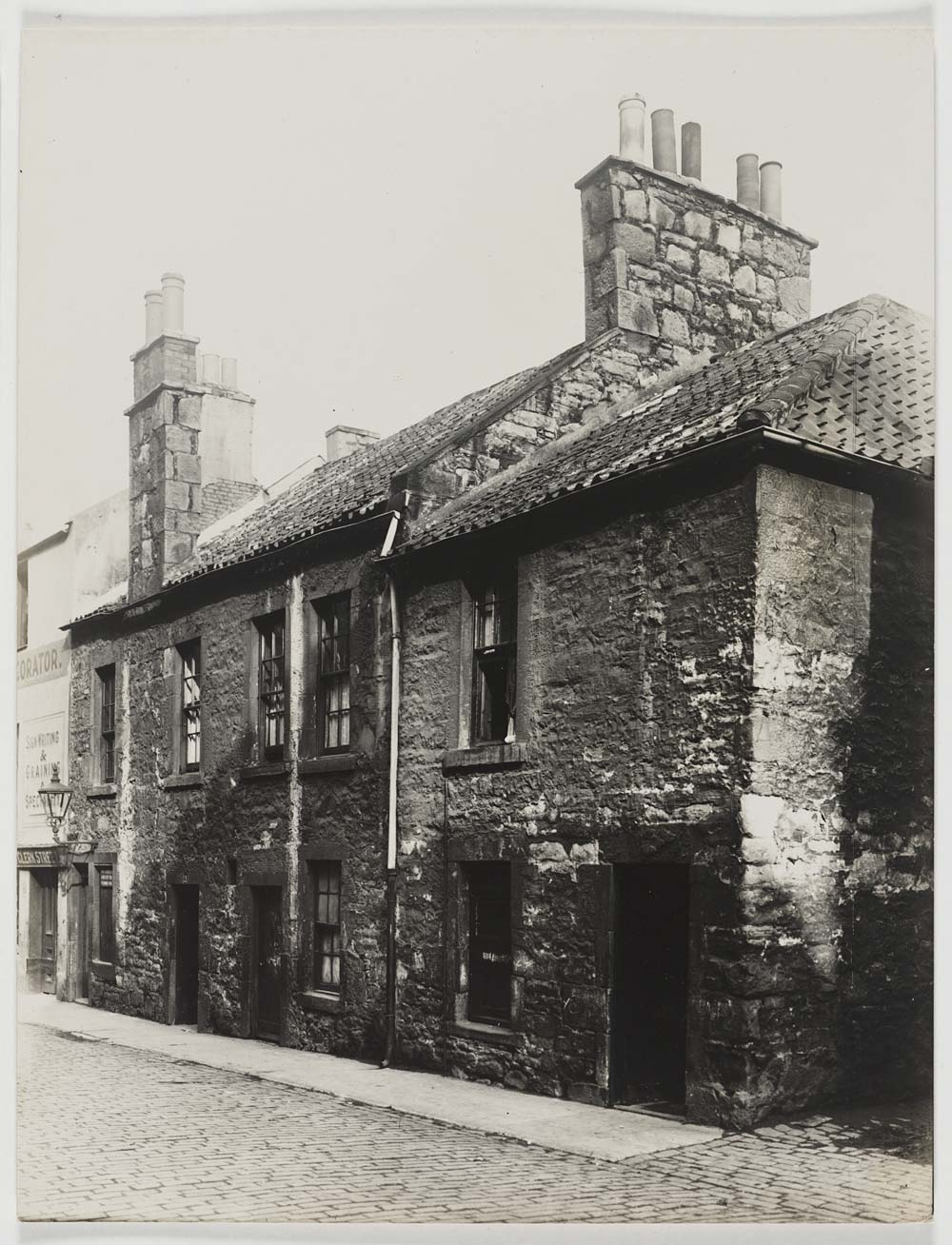

Events from the year 1929 in Scotland.

== Incumbents ==
- Secretary of State for Scotland and Keeper of the Great Seal – Sir John Gilmour, Bt until 4 June; then William Adamson

=== Law officers ===
- Lord Advocate – William Watson until May; then Alexander Munro MacRobert until June; then Craigie Mason Aitchison
- Solicitor General for Scotland – Alexander Munro MacRobert until May; then Wilfrid Normand until June; then John Watson

=== Judiciary ===
- Lord President of the Court of Session and Lord Justice General – Lord Clyde
- Lord Justice Clerk – Lord Alness
- Chairman of the Scottish Land Court – Lord St Vigeans

== Events ==
- 19 January – Perth Corporation Tramways cease operation, being replaced by bus services operated by W. Alexander & Sons.
- 4 May
  - Alexander Munro MacRobert appointed Lord Advocate, replacing William Watson.
  - Wilfrid Normand appointed Solicitor General for Scotland, replacing Alexander Munro MacRobert.
- 10 May – Local Government (Scotland) Act 1929 enacted. Aberdeen, Dundee, Edinburgh and Glasgow are confirmed as having city status in the United Kingdom.
- 31 May – the United Kingdom general election returns a hung parliament. Labour is the party with the largest number of seats in Scotland. On 8 June Ramsay MacDonald forms a new Labour government.
- 7 June – Ross County F.C. founded in Dingwall. They initially play in the Highland League.
- 19 June
  - Craigie Aitchison appointed as Lord Advocate, replacing Alexander Munro MacRobert.
  - John Watson appointed as Solicitor General for Scotland, replacing Wilfrid Normand.
- 2 October – the Union between the Church of Scotland and the United Free Church of Scotland takes place.
- 31 December – Glen Cinema Disaster in Paisley: 69 children die trying to escape smoke.
- Legislation requires both parties to a marriage in Scotland to be at least 16 years old (although no parental consent is needed).
- Edinburgh crematorium opened at Warriston Cemetery.
- Aluminium smelter at Fort William opened in conjunction with Lochaber hydroelectric scheme.
- Lady Blanche Pit at Dysart, Fife, is closed.
- Bus operator Scottish General Transport is renamed Western Scottish Motor Traction.
- The Benmore Botanic Garden becomes the first regional garden of the Royal Botanic Garden Edinburgh.

== Births ==
- 12 January – Alasdair MacIntyre, philosopher
- 25 January – Charles Gray, Labour politician (died 2023)
- 3 February – Ronnie Fraser, agricultural journalist and Liberal politician (died 2010)
- 10 April - Adam Kelso Fulton, rugby union player (died 1994 in Kinross)
- 12 April – Elspet Gray, Lady Rix, actress (died 2013 in London)
- 17 April – Eve Pearce, actress (died 2023 in London)
- 11 May – Stan Kane, actor and singer (died 2015 in Canada)
- 25 May – Arthur Montford, Scottish Television sports journalist (died 2014)
- 11 June – George Gale, cartoonist (died 2003)
- 12 June – John McCluskey, Baron McCluskey, lawyer (died 2017)
- 16 June – Alex Govan, footballer (died 2016 in Plymouth)
- 22 June – John Mone, Roman Catholic Bishop of Paisley (died 2016)
- 10 July – Winnie Ewing, SNP MP and MEP (died 2023)
- 15 July – Rhoda Bulter, poet (died 1994)
- 24 August – John Mackintosh, pro-devolution Labour politician (died 1978)
- 20 September – Joe Temperley, jazz saxophonist (died 2016)
- 26 November - William Dysart, actor (died 2002 in London)
- 2 December – Harry Benson, photographer
- 9 December - Reay Tannahill, historian and novelist (died 2007 in London)
- 11 December – Kenneth MacMillan, choreographer (died 1992 in London)

== Deaths ==
- 1 February – Alexander Ogston, surgeon, discoverer of Staphylococcus (born 1844)
- 3 May – George Gough Arbuthnot, businessman and civic leader in British India (born 1848)
- 14 August – Henry Horne, 1st Baron Horne, First World War general (born 1861)
- 30 August – William Menzies Alexander, medical and theological writer (born 1858)
- 13 September – Robert Lorimer, architect (born 1864)
- 3 October – Robert Climie, trade unionist and Labour MP (born 1868)
- John Brown Abercromby artist (born 1843)

== The arts ==
- 12 August – Edinburgh Playhouse opens as a super-cinema.

== See also ==
- Timeline of Scottish history
- 1929 in Northern Ireland
