= 1845 in Scotland =

- Centuries: 17th; 18th; 19th; 20th; 21st
- Decades: 1820s; 1830s; 1840s; 1850s; 1860s
- See also: List of years in Scotland; Timeline of Scottish history 1845 in: The UK • Wales • Elsewhere

Events from the year 1845 in Scotland.

== Incumbents ==
=== Law officers ===
- Lord Advocate – Duncan McNeill
- Solicitor General for Scotland – Adam Anderson

=== Judiciary ===
- Lord President of the Court of Session and Lord Justice General – Lord Boyle
- Lord Justice Clerk – Lord Hope

== Events ==
- 31 July – Aberdeen Railway Bill receives Royal Assent
- 14 August – the Falkirk Herald newspaper is first published
- October – Aberdeen stock exchange formed
- Glasgow Academy founded
- Tolbooth Kirk, Edinburgh, designed by James Gillespie Graham and Augustus Pugin, is completed as a church and General Assembly hall (Victoria Hall) for the Church of Scotland in the Royal Mile
- Scottish Rights of Way Society established
- Publication of the New Statistical Account of Scotland is completed
- Publication of Robert William Billings' The Baronial and Ecclesiastical Antiquities of Scotland begins.

== Births ==
- 8 January – James Stedman Dixon, leading coal-mine owner (died 1911)
- 14 February – Cecil Valentine De Vere, born Cecil Valentine Brown, chess player (died 1875)
- 25 February – George Reid, Prime Minister of Australia, later Member of Parliament (UK) (died 1918)
- 17 March – Robert Fleming, financier (died 1933)
- 28 October – Robert Gibb, painter (died 1932)
- 2 December – Alexander Crombie, surgeon (died 1906)
- David Forsyth, chess player (died 1909 in New Zealand)
- James Manson, locomotive engineer (died 1935)

== Deaths ==
- 7 August – Robert Graham, physician and botanist (born 1786)
- 30 September – Robert Forsyth, writer (born 1766)
- 26 October – Carolina Nairne, songwriter (born 1766)

== Sport ==
- Penicuik hosts the inaugural Grand Match in curling, between the north and the south of Scotland.

== See also ==
- Timeline of Scottish history
- 1845 in Ireland
