= 1933 in Scotland =

- Centuries: 18th; 19th; 20th; 21st
- Decades: 1910s; 1920s; 1930s; 1940s; 1950s
- See also: List of years in Scotland; Timeline of Scottish history 1933 in: The UK • Wales • Elsewhere; Scottish football: 1932–33 • 1933–34

Events from the year 1933 in Scotland.

== Incumbents ==
- Secretary of State for Scotland and Keeper of the Great Seal – Sir Godfrey Collins

=== Law officers ===
- Lord Advocate – Craigie Mason Aitchison until October; then Wilfrid Normand
- Solicitor General for Scotland – Wilfrid Normand until October; then Douglas Jamieson

=== Judiciary ===
- Lord President of the Court of Session and Lord Justice General – Lord Clyde
- Lord Justice Clerk – Lord Alness, then Lord Aitchison
- Chairman of the Scottish Land Court – Lord St Vigeans

== Events ==
- 2 February – East Fife by-election: The seat is retained by the National Liberal Party; Eric Linklater stands for the National Party of Scotland.
- 3 April – Two British aircraft piloted by Squadron Leader the Marquess of Clydesdale and Flight Lieutenant David MacIntyre make the first flight over Mount Everest.
- 30 April – First domestic flight service in Scotland, Renfrew to Campbeltown, operated by Midland & Scottish Air Ferries Ltd. Winifred Drinkwater, "the world's first female commercial pilot", is hired to fly the route.
- 2 May – First modern "sighting" of the Loch Ness Monster.
- 28 July – Administration of Justice (Scotland) Act 1933 receives royal assent.
- 9 August – Hoard of silver denarii and a contemporaneous fragment of tartan cloth found at Falkirk.
- 2 November – Kilmarnock by-election: The seat is retained by the National Labour Organisation; Sir Alexander MacEwen stands for the Scottish Party with the endorsement of the National Party of Scotland.
- Scottish Democratic Fascist Party founded by William Weir Gilmour and Major Hume Sleigh to oppose Irish Catholic emigration to Scotland.

== Births ==
- 11 January – Duncan Glen, poet, literary editor and Professor of Visual Communication (died 2008)
- 4 February – Jimmy Murray, footballer (died 2015)
- 18 February – Mary Ure, actress (died 1975 in London)
- 7 March – Donald Douglas, actor
- 2 April – Donald Gorrie, Liberal Democrat politician and MSP (died 2012)
- 10 May – Harold Davis, Scottish football player, manager (died 2018)
- 10 June – Ian Campbell, folk singer (died 2012)
- 30 June – Dave Duncan, fantasy and science fiction writer, resident in Canada (died 2018 in Canada)
- 13 July – Patricia Leitch writer, best known for children's books (died 2015)
- 12 August – Frederic Lindsay, writer of crime fiction (died 2013)
- 12 September – Felix Reilly, footballer (died 2018)
- 19 September – David McCallum, actor (died 2023 in the United States)
- 11 November – Alexander Goudie, painter (died 2004)
- 26 November – Richard Holloway, Bishop of Edinburgh in the Scottish Episcopal Church
- 19 December – Christopher Smout academic, historian, author and Historiographer Royal in Scotland
- 24 December – Nicholas Fairbairn, lawyer and Conservative politician (died 1995)
- 30 December – Andy Stewart, singer (died 1993)
- Michael Deacon, actor (died 2000 in London)
- Alan Watson, legal scholar (died 2018)

== Deaths ==
- 10 January – Margaret Macdonald Mackintosh, artist and designer (born 1864)
- 16 February - George Beatson, physician, pioneer in the field of oncology (born 1848 in Trincomalee)
- 16 February - Dorothy Carleton Smyth, artist and designer (born 1880)
- 4 May - Alexander Marshall Mackenzie, architect (born 1848)
- 30 June – Edward Atkinson Hornel, painter (born 1864 in Australia)
- 25 July – John May, international footballer (born 1878)
- 31 July – Robert Fleming, financier (born 1845)
- 30 December – Dugald Cowan, educationalist and Liberal politician (born 1865)
- Janet Milne Rae, novelist (born 1844)

== The arts ==
- May – the first radio play in Gaelic, Dunach, is broadcast by the BBC.
- The Curtain Theatre (Glasgow) presents its first season.
- Erik Chisholm composes his Straloch Suite.
- Agnes Mure Mackenzie publishes An Historical Survey of Scottish Literature to 1714.
- Nan Shepherd publishes her last novel A Pass in the Grampians.

== See also ==
- Timeline of Scottish history
- 1933 in Northern Ireland
