= 1932 in Scotland =

- Centuries: 18th; 19th; 20th; 21st
- Decades: 1910s; 1920s; 1930s; 1940s; 1950s
- See also: List of years in Scotland; Timeline of Scottish history 1932 in: The UK • Wales • Elsewhere; Scottish football: 1931–32 • 1932–33

Events from the year 1932 in Scotland.

== Incumbents ==
- Secretary of State for Scotland and Keeper of the Great Seal – Sir Archibald Sinclair, Bt until 28 September; then Sir Godfrey Collins

=== Law officers ===
- Lord Advocate – Craigie Mason Aitchison
- Solicitor General for Scotland – Wilfrid Normand

=== Judiciary ===
- Lord President of the Court of Session and Lord Justice General – Lord Clyde
- Lord Justice Clerk – Lord Alness
- Chairman of the Scottish Land Court – Lord St Vigeans

== Events ==
- 26 May – the Scots law case of Donoghue v Stevenson is decided in the House of Lords, establishing the modern concept of a duty of care in cases of negligence.
- 26 September – first contingent of the National Hunger March leaves Glasgow.
- 16 November – a colliery explosion at Cardowan kills 11 miners.
- Wendy Wood leads a group of nationalists into Stirling Castle, at this time an Army barracks as well as a heritage attraction, to tear down the Union Flag and replace it with a Scottish standard.
- Finnieston Crane begins operation.
- Etive Bridge, Stirling, built.
- A flock of Soay sheep is translocated from Soay to Hirta (also in the depopulated St Kilda archipelago) by conservationist John Crichton-Stuart, 4th Marquess of Bute.
- Edinburgh Synagogue is opened.

== Births ==
- 4 January – Dick Douglas, Labour, later SNP, Member of Parliament (died 2014)
- 19 January – George MacBeth, poet and novelist (died 1992 in Ireland)
- 20 February – Tom Patey, mountaineer (died in climbing accident 1970)
- 24 February – Ian McNeill, footballer (died 2017)
- 12 March – Rory McEwen, artist and musician (died 1982 in England)
- 21 March – Thomas Welsh Watson, stage, television and film actor (died 2001)
- 8 April – Joan Lingard, writer (died 2022)
- 11 April – James Morrison, painter (died 2020)
- 4 May – Sandy MacAra, epidemiologist (died 2012 in England)
- 8 May – Phyllida Law, actress
- 15 May – Joseph Beltrami, defence lawyer (died 2015)
- 2 June
  - Tom Nairn, political theorist and academic (died 2023)
  - Jim Petrie, comic artist (died 2014)
- 5 June – Robert Maxwell Ogilvie, classical scholar (died 1981)
- 8 June – Ian Kirkwood, Lord Kirkwood, lawyer and judge (died 2017)
- 1 July – Donny MacLeod, television presenter (died 1984)
- 9 July – Jimmy Reid, trade unionist (died 2010)
- 9 August – Tam Dalyell, Labour Member of Parliament (died 2017)
- 13 August – John Bannerman, historian of Gaelic Scotland (died 2008)
- 3 October – Tommy Preston, footballer (died 2015)
- 11 October – Billie Anthony, born Philomena Levy, singer (died 1991 in England)
- 28 October – Ewen Fergusson, Scotland international rugby union player and diplomat (died 2017)
- 25 November – Maureen Swanson, actress, Countess of Dudley (died 2011)

== Deaths ==
- 8 January – William Graham, Scottish politician (born 1887)
- 25 January – James Paterson, painter (born 1854)
- 11 February – Robert Gibb, painter (born 1845)
- 31 March – Thomas David Anderson, amateur astronomer (born 1853)
- 14 April – Cynicus (Martin Anderson), satirical cartoonist and postcard publisher (born 1854)
- 8 July – John Wilson, Lord Ashmore, Sheriff 1900–20, Senator of the College of Justice 1930–28 (born 1857)
- 16 September – James Whitelaw Hamilton, landscape painter (born 1860)
- William Gillies, nationalist (born 1865)

== The arts ==
- Jenny Brown's short documentary film Da Makkin' O' A Keshie is made.
- Lewis Grassic Gibbon's novel Sunset Song, first of his A Scots Quair trilogy, is published.
- Fionn MacColla's novel The Albannach is published.

== See also ==
- Timeline of Scottish history
- 1932 in Northern Ireland
