= 1911 in Scotland =

- Centuries: 18th; 19th; 20th; 21st
- Decades: 1890s; 1900s; 1910s; 1920s; 1930s
- See also: List of years in Scotland; Timeline of Scottish history 1911 in: The UK • Wales • Elsewhere; Scottish football: 1910–11 • 1911–12

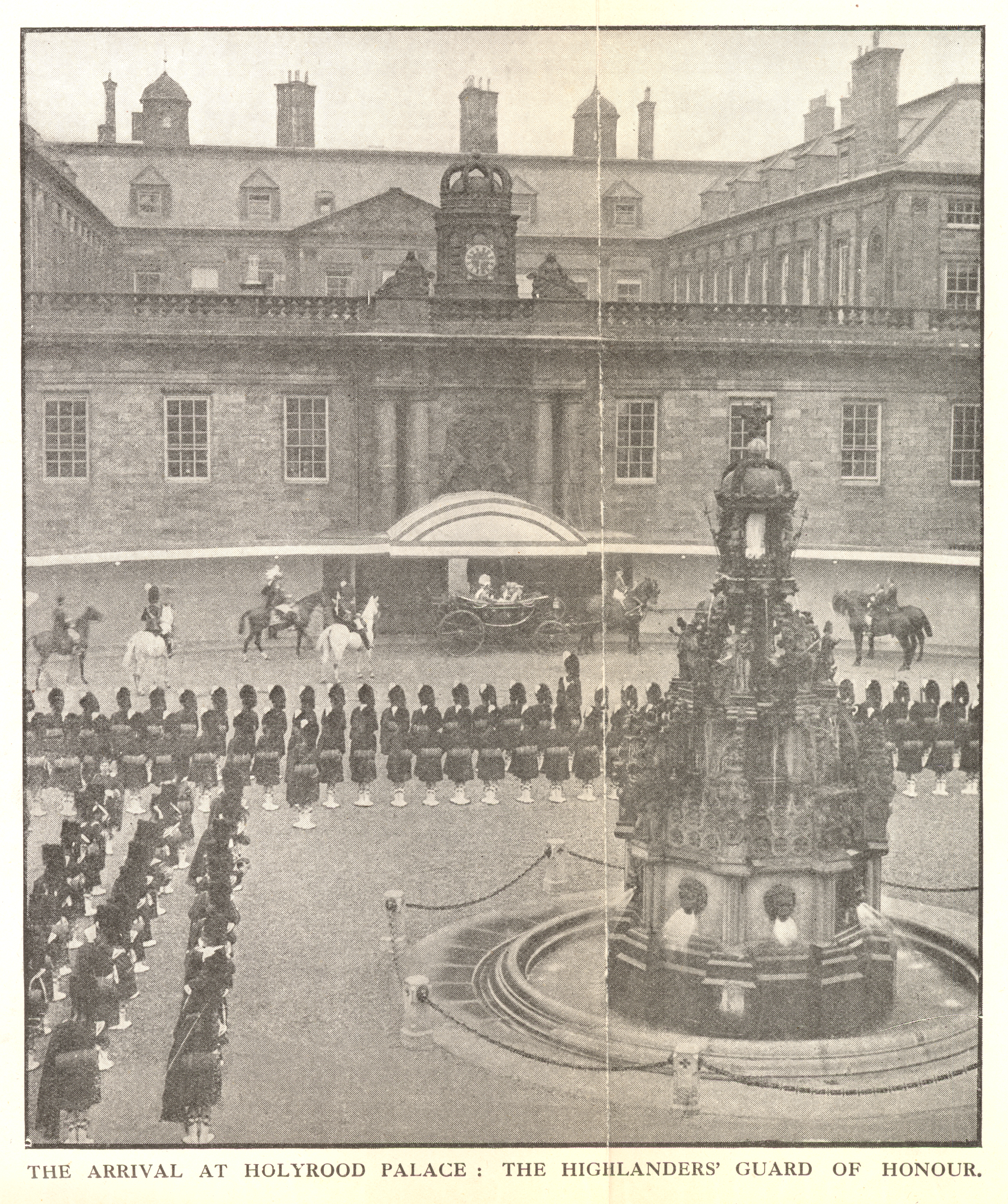
The arrival at Holyrood Palace: The Highlander's Guard of Honour on 11 July 1911.

Events from the year 1911 in Scotland.

== Incumbents ==
- Secretary for Scotland and Keeper of the Great Seal – John Sinclair, 1st Baron Pentland

=== Law officers ===
- Lord Advocate – Alexander Ure
- Solicitor General for Scotland – William Hunter; then Andrew Anderson

=== Judiciary ===
- Lord President of the Court of Session and Lord Justice General – Lord Dunedin
- Lord Justice Clerk – Lord Kingsburgh

== Events ==
- 27 January – opening of Scottish Motor Exhibition in Edinburgh.
- March–April – eleven thousand workers at the Singer Manufacturing Co. sewing machine factory on Clydebank go on strike in solidarity with twelve female colleagues protesting against work process reorganisation; four hundred alleged ringleaders are dismissed.
- 2 May–4 November – Scottish Exhibition of National History, Art and Industry at Kelvingrove Park, Glasgow.
- 9 May – a fire at the Empire Palace Theatre in Edinburgh kills eleven people, including illusionist Sigmund Neuberger ("The Great Lafayette") and also his lion and horse; he is buried in Piershill Cemetery with his dog Beauty.
- 19 July – Thistle Chapel, designed by Robert Lorimer, dedicated in St Giles' Cathedral, Edinburgh.
- 24 July – start of Scottish leg of first Daily Mail Circuit of Britain air race, Hendon–Harrogate–Newcastle–Edinburgh–Stirling–Glasgow–Carlisle.
- 11 September – Sir Fitzroy Maclean, 10th Baronet, buys the ruined Duart Castle on the Isle of Mull to restore as the seat of the Clan Maclean.
- 11 November – Barclay Curle launch cargo ship Jutlandia at their Clydeholm yard, the first British-built oil-engined vessel designed for ocean service.
- 16 October – new building for the Mitchell Library opened in Glasgow.
- Royal Engineers balloon squadron sets up a training camp in Tentsmuir Forest on the Fife coast, predecessor of Leuchars Station.
- The Pavilion opened at Ayr.

== Births ==
- 11 February – Alec Cairncross, economist (died 1998)
- 11 March – Sir Fitzroy Maclean, 1st Baronet, soldier, writer and politician (died 1996)
- 24 January – Muir Mathieson, film composer (died 1975)
- 14 May – Sir John Ritchie Inch, police Chief Constable (died 1993)
- 31 May – Leonard Boden, portrait painter (died 1999)
- 16 June – Bobby Ancell football player and manager (died 1987)
- 9 July – Brigadier Simon Fraser, 15th Lord Lovat, Chief of Clan Fraser of Lovat and Commando (died 1995)
- 26 October – Sorley MacLean, poet (died 1996)
- 4 December – William Baxter, Labour MP for West Stirlingshire (1959–1974) (died 1979)

== Deaths ==
- 14 February – Eustace Balfour, architect (born 1854)
- 21 May – Williamina Fleming, astronomer, discoverer of the Horsehead Nebula (born 1857)
- 4 October – Joseph Bell, surgeon (born 1837)
- 11 December – William McGregor, football administrator and founder of the Football League (born 1846)
- Robert Hamilton Paterson, architect (born 1843)

== The arts ==
- Release of Rob Roy, the first British-made three-reel feature film, shot by the Scottish company United Films Ltd in studios at Rouken Glen on the edge of Glasgow and on location in Aberfoyle.
- Violet Jacob's historical novel Flemington is published.
- Harry Lauder writes the popular song "Roamin' In The Gloamin'".
- Ayr Picture Palace opens, the town's first purpose-built cinema.

== See also ==
- Timeline of Scottish history
- 1911 in Ireland
