= 1931 in Scotland =

- Centuries: 18th; 19th; 20th; 21st
- Decades: 1910s; 1920s; 1930s; 1940s; 1950s
- See also: List of years in Scotland; Timeline of Scottish history 1931 in: The UK • Wales • Elsewhere; Scottish football: 1930–31 • 1931–32

Events from the year 1931 in Scotland.

== Incumbents ==
- Secretary of State for Scotland and Keeper of the Great Seal – William Adamson until 24 August; then Sir Archibald Sinclair, Bt

=== Law officers ===
- Lord Advocate – Craigie Mason Aitchison
- Solicitor General for Scotland – John Charles Watson until November; then Wilfrid Normand

=== Judiciary ===
- Lord President of the Court of Session and Lord Justice General – Lord Clyde
- Lord Justice Clerk – Lord Alness
- Chairman of the Scottish Land Court – Lord St Vigeans

== Events ==
- 13 February – Scottish Youth Hostels Association established.
- 1 May – National Trust for Scotland established and acquires its first property, Crookston Castle (donated by Sir John Stirling-Maxwell, 10th Baronet).
- 5 September – Celtic goalkeeper John Thomson dies in hospital after fracturing his skull in a collision with Rangers forward Sam English in the 'Old Firm' League derby at Ibrox Park.
- 15–16 September – Invergordon Mutiny: Sailors in the Royal Navy take strike action over pay cuts.
- 27 October – 1931 United Kingdom general election: The Unionist Party wins a majority of Scottish seats as the National Government retains power with a landslide victory throughout the UK.
- 12 December – work on construction of "Hull 534", the Cunard liner RMS Queen Mary, at John Brown & Company's shipyard at Clydebank is suspended due to the Great Depression.
- 31 December – Ayr Corporation Tramways cease operation, being replaced by bus services operated by Scottish Motor Traction.
- Lord Dumfries purchases the recently deserted islands of St Kilda from Sir Reginald MacLeod of Dunvegan to preserve them as a bird sanctuary; he will bequeath them to the National Trust of Scotland on his death in 1956.

== Births ==
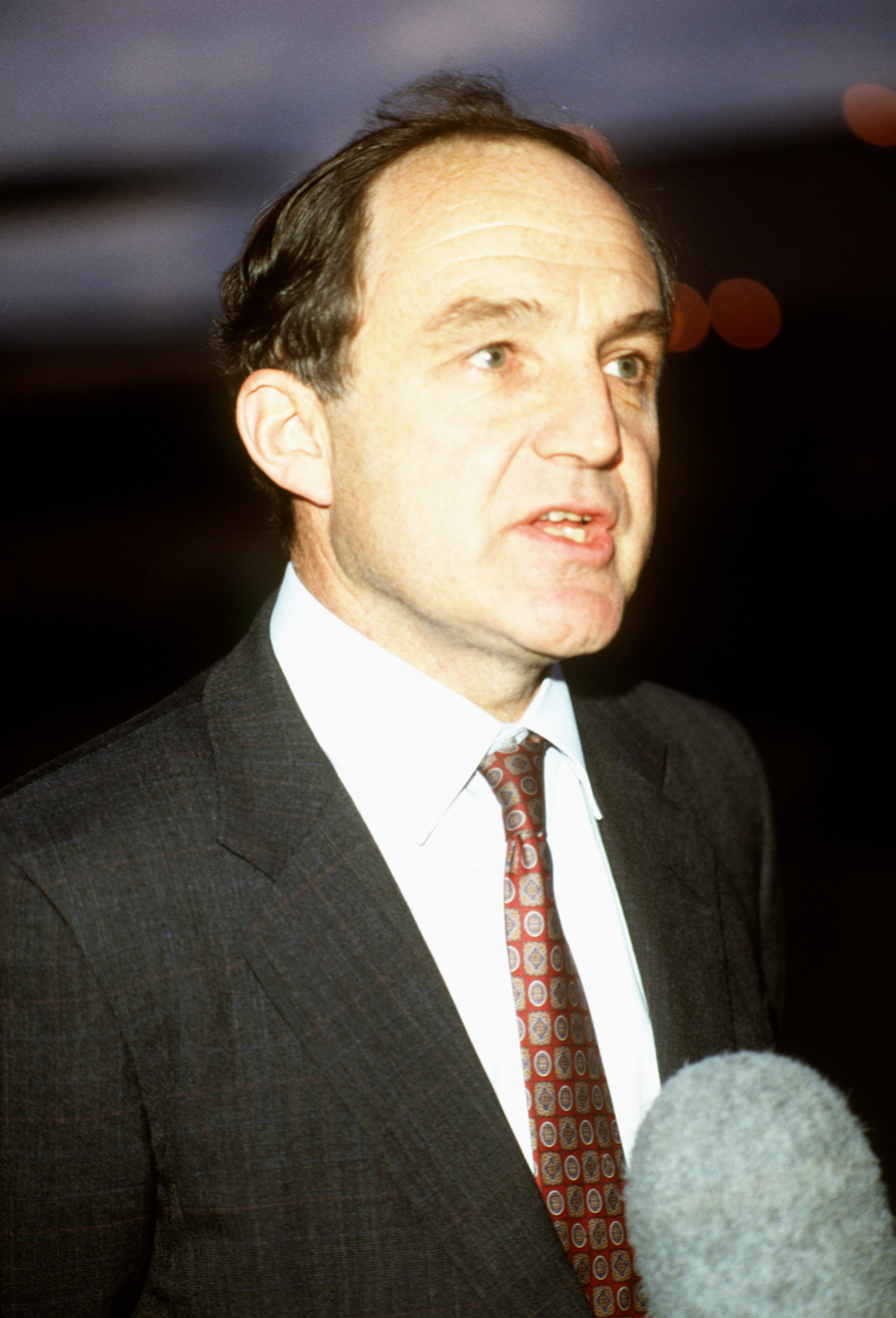
George Younger

- 2 January – James D. Murray, mathematician and academic
- 12 January – Bert Ormond, Scottish-born New Zealand footballer (died 2017)
- 26 February – Ally McLeod, football manager (died 2004)
- 13 March
  - James Martin, actor
  - Helen Renton, Director of the Women's Royal Air Force (died 2016)
- 18 March
  - John Fraser, actor (died 2020)
  - Ian McMillan, footballer (died 2024)
- 29 March – James Weatherhead, Church of Scotland minister (died 2017)
- 27 April – Alex Campbell, folk singer (died 1987)
- 29 April – Lonnie Donegan, skiffle musician (died 2002 in England)
- 30 April - William Watson, author, playwright and newspaper editor (died 2005)
- 3 May – Thomas Sutherland, academic and Islamic Jihad hostage (died 2016 in the United States)
- 6 May – Sandy Grant Gordon, whisky distiller (died 2020)
- 9 May
  - Jimmy Gauld, footballer involved in match fixing (died 2004 in London)
  - Alistair MacFarlane, engineer and academic (died 2021)
- 11 June – Kenneth Cameron, Baron Cameron of Lochbroom, lawyer and judge
- 16 June – John Grant, footballer (died 2021)
- 1 August - Pat Heywood, actress
- 2 August – Karl Miller, literary editor (died 2014 in England)
- 11 September – Bill Simpson, television actor (died 1993)
- 22 September – George Younger, Conservative politician, Secretary of State for Scotland (died 2003)
- 24 September – Elizabeth Blackadder, painter (died 2021)
- September - Arthur Thompson, gangster (died 1986)
- 9 December – Ian McIntyre, journalist and BBC Radio executive (died 2014)
- 16 December - Karl Denver, singer (died 1998 in Manchester)
- 29 December – Bobby Shearer, footballer (died 2006)
- Eric Auld, painter (died 2013)

== Deaths ==
- 17 March – James Stewart, Labour Party politician, MP for Glasgow St. Rollox 1922–1931 (born 1863)
- 27 May – Norah Neilson Gray, portrait painter (born 1882)
- 5 August – Archibald Barr, mechanical engineer (born 1855)
- 3 December - Frederick Walters, architect, notable for his Roman Catholic churches (born 1849 in London)
- 7 December – Leslie Hunter, painter (born 1877)
- David Hay Fleming, historian and antiquary (born 1849)
- Ronald Campbell Macfie, medical doctor, poet and science writer (born 1867)
- Andrew Seth Pringle-Pattison, philosopher (born 1856)

== The arts ==
- Jenny Brown's documentary film A Crofter's Life in Scotland is made.
- A. J. Cronin's first novel Hatter's Castle is published.
- Bruce Marshall's novel Father Malachy's Miracle is published.
- Dorothy L. Sayers' detective story The Five Red Herrings, set amongst the Galloway artistic community, is published.
- Approximate date – Ronnie L. Scott makes the first Scottish colour film, Where the Bens Stand Sentinel, and first Scottish sound film, Sunny Days.

== See also ==
- Timeline of Scottish history
- 1931 in Northern Ireland
