= 1915 in Scotland =

- Centuries: 18th; 19th; 20th; 21st
- Decades: 1890s; 1900s; 1910s; 1920s; 1930s
- See also: List of years in Scotland; Timeline of Scottish history 1915 in: The UK • Wales • Elsewhere; Scottish football: 1914–15 • 1915–16

Events from the year 1915 in Scotland.

== Incumbents ==
- Secretary for Scotland and Keeper of the Great Seal – Thomas McKinnon Wood

=== Law officers ===
- Lord Advocate – Robert Munro
- Solicitor General for Scotland – Thomas Brash Morison

=== Judiciary ===
- Lord President of the Court of Session and Lord Justice General – Lord Strathclyde
- Lord Justice Clerk – Lord Kingsburgh, then Lord Dickson
- Chairman of the Scottish Land Court – Lord Kennedy

== Events ==
- 26 January – Royal Navy King Edward VII-class battleship HMS Britannia runs aground on Inchkeith in the Firth of Forth and suffers considerable damage.
- 19 February – Royal Navy Acorn-class destroyer HMS Goldfinch (1910) is wrecked on Start Point, Sanday, Orkney.
- 10 March – World War I: German submarine U-12 is hunted down by Royal Navy destroyers HMS Ariel, HMS Acheron and HMS Attack off the Firth of Forth and sunk with the loss of 19 of her crew, 10 being saved.
- 11 March – World War I: Armed merchantman HMS Bayano (1914) is sunk off Galloway by German U-boat SM U-27 with the loss of around 200 of her crew, 26 being saved.
- 18 March – World War I: Royal Navy battleship HMS Dreadnought (1906) sinks German submarine U-29 with all hands in the Pentland Firth by ramming her, the only time this tactic is known to have been successfully used by a battleship.
- April – Glasgow becomes the first U.K. city to employ women conductors on public transport for the duration of the War.
- 25 April – World War I: Gallipoli Campaign – Carnoustie-born seaman George Samson wins the Victoria Cross for his actions under fire during the landing at Cape Helles.
- 22 May – Quintinshill rail disaster near Gretna Green: collision and fire kill 226, mostly Royal Scots soldiers, the UK's largest number of fatalities in a railway accident.
- 12 June – World War I: Oil tanker SS Desabla is torpedoed and sunk by German submarine U-17 off Montrose.
- 23 June – World War I: Two German submarines sink 17 vessels from the Lerwick fishing fleet.
- 3 July – World War I: 15th (Scottish) Infantry Division receives embarkation orders for France.
- 25 September – World War I: Battle of Loos opens: Piper Daniel Laidlaw leads 7th Battalion, The King's Own Scottish Borderers in the advance on the enemy trenches, an action for which he is awarded the Victoria Cross.
- 27 September & 13 October – World War I: Tillicoultry-born second cousins James Dalgleish Pollock and James Lennox Dawson each win the Victoria Cross for their actions at the Battle of the Hohenzollern Redoubt (part of the Battle of Loos).
- 27 October – World War I: Glasgow revolutionary socialist anti-war protester John Maclean is arrested for the first time under the Defence of the Realm Act and dismissed from his job as a teacher.
- 8 November – Copinsay lighthouse in Orkney (engineer: D. Alan Stevenson) first illuminated.
- 27 November
  - Government introduces legislation to restrict housing rents to their pre-war level following Glasgow rent strikes led by Mary Barbour.
  - Auxiliary cruiser HMS Caribbean sinks off Cape Wrath in a storm; 15 are killed.
- 10 December – World War I: Douglas Haig is appointed to command the British Expeditionary Force.
- 30 December – Armoured cruiser HMS Natal (1905) capsizes at anchor in the Cromarty Firth as the result of an internal explosion in her ammunition stores; 390 sailors and some civilians are killed.
- World War I – Khaki Balmoral bonnet, known as the tam o' shanter, introduced for wear by Scottish troops in the trenches of the Western Front.

== Births ==
- 21 February – John Brown, international footballer (died 2005)
- 29 March – George Chisholm, jazz trombonist (died 1997 in London)
- 8 May – John George Macleod, doctor of medicine and a writer of medical textbooks (died 2006)
- 6 September – Calum Maclean, folklorist (died 1960)
- 27 October – Robert Alexander Rankin, mathematician (died 2001)
- 6 November – David I. Masson, science-fiction writer and librarian (died 1979 in Leeds)
- 8 November – George Sutherland Fraser, poet and critic (died 1980 in Leicester)
- 15 November – David Stirling, mountaineer, World War II British Army officer, and the founder of the Special Air Service (died 1990)
- 17 December – Stuart Hood novelist, translator, television producer and Controller of BBC Television (died 2011)
- 28 December – Jack Milroy, comedian (died 2001)
- 31 December – Neil Paterson, writer and footballer (died 1995)
- George Campbell Hay, poet (died 1984)
- Ernest Marwick, writer noted for his writings on Orkney folklore and history (died 1977)

== Deaths ==
- 13 January – Mary Slessor, missionary (born 1848; died in Nigeria)
- 6 March – Louisa Jordan, nurse (born 1848; died of typhus in Serbia)
- 9 March – Sir James Donaldson classical scholar, and educational and theological writer (born 1831)
- 19 April – Sir Thomas Clouston, psychiatrist (born 1840)
- 23 April – Robert W. Sterling, poet (born 1893; killed in action)
- 8 May – Walter Lyon, lawyer and war poet (born 1886; missing in action)
- 7 July – Samuel Cockburn, physician, practising homeopathy (born 1823)
- 26 September – Keir Hardie, socialist, first chairman of the Parliamentary Labour Party and pacifist (born 1856)
- 2 October – Lord Ninian Crichton-Stuart, British Army officer and Unionist politician (born 1883; killed in action)
- 13 October – Charles Sorley, poet (born 1895; killed in action)
- 22 October – Sir Andrew Noble, 1st Baronet, physicist (born 1831)

== The arts ==
- August–September – John Buchan's thriller The Thirty-Nine Steps, set largely in Galloway immediately before the outbreak of war and introducing his hero Richard Hannay, is serialised in Blackwood's Magazine before being published in book form in October by William Blackwood and Sons in Edinburgh.
- Violet Jacob's poetry collection Songs of Angus is published.
- Sculptor James Pittendrigh Macgillivray's poetry collection Pro Patria is published.

== See also ==
- Timeline of Scottish history
- 1915 in Ireland
