= 2015 in Scottish television =

This is a list of events in Scottish television from 2015.

== Events ==
=== January ===
- 12 January – Launch of STV Edinburgh.

=== February ===
- 18 February – A groundbreaking party election broadcast in which Scottish Conservative Party leader Ruth Davidson is seen with her partner Jen Wilson is aired on television in Scotland.
- 26 February – STV reports a 14% rise in pre-tax profits for 2014.

=== March ===
- 19 March – STV is awarded three more local TV licences for the Aberdeen, Dundee and Ayr areas under the working titles of Around Aberdeen, View from the Bridges and Ayrshire Today.

=== April ===
- 7 April – Nicola Sturgeon, Jim Murphy, Ruth Davidson and Willie Rennie—the leaders of Scotland's four main political parties—take part in an STV televised debate in Edinburgh ahead of the 2015 UK general election.
- 8 April – BBC Scotland airs the second leaders debate in 24 hours, this time from Aberdeen. The programme features Nicola Sturgeon of the Scottish National Party, Jim Murphy for the Scottish Labour Party, Ruth Davidson for the Scottish Conservative Party, Willie Rennie for the Scottish Liberal Democrats, Patrick Harvie of the Scottish Greens and David Coburn for the UK Independence Party.
- 30 April – Following the Question Time Leaders Special, voters in Scotland have a chance to question Nicola Sturgeon in a 30-minute BBC One Scotland programme titled Ask Nicola Sturgeon.

=== May ===
- 3 May – Nicola Sturgeon, Jim Murphy, Ruth Davidson and Willie Rennie take part in the final Scottish leaders debate, held by the BBC in Edinburgh.
- 20 May – BBC One's Reporting Scotland is among the winners at the 2015 Royal Television Society Scotland Awards, winning an accolade for best news programme.

=== June ===
- 12 June – The Guardian reports that union leaders and staff at BBC Scotland are considering industrial action in a dispute over the way the BBC handled grievance and bullying allegations against a senior executive. The disagreement also threatens to reignite allegations of BBC bias that first surfaced during the run up to the independence referendum as two of the parties involved have ties to Scotland's two main political parties—the Scottish National Party and Scottish Labour.

=== September ===
- 7 September – The case against Alistair Carmichael MP, raised against him by four of his constituents, was broadcast and streamed online live from the Court of Session in Edinburgh, which sat as a special Election Court.

== Television series ==
- Reporting Scotland (1968–1983; 1984–present)
- Sportscene (1975–present)
- Public Account (1976–present)
- The Beechgrove Garden (1978–present)
- Only an Excuse? (1993–2020)
- River City (2002–2026)
- The Adventure Show (2005–present)
- Trusadh (2008–present)
- STV Rugby (2009–2010; 2011–present)
- Gary: Tank Commander (2009–present)
- Sport Nation (2009–present)
- STV News at Six (2009–present)
- The Nightshift (2010–present)
- Scotland Tonight (2011–present)
- Shetland (2013–present)
- Scot Squad (2014–present)

== Deaths ==
- 30 May – Jake D'Arcy, 69, actor (Still Game)

== See also ==
- 2015 in Scotland
