= 1840 in Scotland =

- Centuries: 17th; 18th; 19th; 20th; 21st
- Decades: 1820s; 1830s; 1840s; 1850s; 1860s
- See also: List of years in Scotland; Timeline of Scottish history 1840 in: The UK • Wales • Elsewhere

Events from the year 1840 in Scotland.

== Incumbents ==
=== Law officers ===
- Lord Advocate – Andrew Rutherfurd
- Solicitor General for Scotland – James Ivory; then Thomas Maitland

=== Judiciary ===
- Lord President of the Court of Session and Lord Justice General – Lord Granton
- Lord Justice Clerk – Lord Boyle

== Events ==
- 10 January – Uniform Penny Post introduced throughout the United Kingdom, replacing the Uniform Fourpenny Post of 1839. From 6 May, the Penny Black, the world's first postage stamp, becomes valid for prepayment of postage. Advocates of the scheme include Robert Wallace (MP for Greenock) and James Chalmers.
- 14 January – the first known baptisms by the Church of Jesus Christ of Latter-day Saints in Scotland take place in the River Clyde at Bishopton when Samuel Mulliner, a Scot who joined the church in Canada, baptizes Alexander and Jessie Hay. In May, Orson Pratt preaches from Arthur's Seat in Edinburgh.
- July – last known great auk in the British Isles caught and later killed on the islet of Stac an Armin, St Kilda, Scotland.
- 4 July – the Cunard Line's 700-ton wooden paddle steamer RMS Britannia, launched by Robert Duncan & Company at Greenock on 5 February, departs from Liverpool bound for Halifax, Nova Scotia, on the first steam transatlantic passenger mail service. Scottish marine engineer Robert Napier is a major partner in the venture and has supplied the ship's engine.
- 21 July – first burial at the Southern Necropolis in Glasgow.
- 12 August – the Glasgow, Paisley, Kilmarnock and Ayr Railway is opened throughout between Glasgow Bridge Street railway station and Ayr, the first inter-urban railway in Scotland.
- 15 August – foundation stone of the Scott Monument in Edinburgh is laid.
- 31 August – the Slamannan Railway is opened.
- Approximate date – Forglen House, designed by John Smith, is completed.

== Births ==
- 1 January – Dugald Drummond, steam locomotive engineer (died 1912 in England)
- 24 January – George Smith, Bishop of Argyll and the Isles (Catholic) (died 1918)
- 5 February
  - Charlotte Carmichael, pioneer of higher education for women (died 1929 in England)
  - John Boyd Dunlop, inventor (died 1921 in Ireland)
- 3 March – Hugh Smellie, steam locomotive engineer (died 1891)
- 22 April – Thomas Clouston, psychiatrist (died 1915)
- 15 July – William Wilson Hunter, official of the Indian Civil Service (British India) (died 1900 in England)
- 29 November – James Crichton-Browne, psychiatrist (died 1938)
- J. M. Brydon, architect (died 1901 in England)

== Deaths ==
- 9 March – George Gleig, Primus of the Scottish Episcopal Church (born 1753)
- 10 April – Alexander Nasmyth, painter (born 1758)

== See also ==
- 1840 in Ireland
