= 1914 in Scotland =

- Centuries: 18th; 19th; 20th; 21st
- Decades: 1890s; 1900s; 1910s; 1920s; 1930s
- See also: List of years in Scotland; Timeline of Scottish history 1914 in: The UK • Wales • Elsewhere; Scottish football: 1913–14 • 1914–15

Events from the year 1914 in Scotland.

== Incumbents ==
- Secretary for Scotland and Keeper of the Great Seal – Thomas McKinnon Wood

=== Law officers ===
- Lord Advocate – Robert Munro
- Solicitor General for Scotland – Thomas Brash Morison

=== Judiciary ===
- Lord President of the Court of Session and Lord Justice General – Lord Strathclyde
- Lord Justice Clerk – Lord Kingsburgh
- Chairman of the Scottish Land Court – Lord Kennedy

== Events ==
- 21 February – Militant suffragette Ethel Moorhead, imprisoned in Calton Jail, Edinburgh, for attempted fire-raising, becomes the first in Scotland to suffer force-feeding while on hunger strike; four days later she is released on health grounds.
- 14 April – A collision at Burntisland railway station between an express and a shunting goods train following a signalman's error kills two locomotive crew and injures twelve passengers.
- 2 May – Glasgow newspaper The Saturday Post, a predecessor of The Sunday Post, changes its title to The Sporting Post.
- 18 June – A railway bridge collapse at Carrbridge following a torrential thunderstorm kills five people.
- July – Militant suffragette Fanny Parker is arrested while attempting (probably with Ethel Moorhead) to set fire to Burns Cottage, Alloway.
- 3 July – Govanhill Baths in Glasgow inaugurated.
- 4 July – A memorial is unveiled at Hawick to the Battle of Hornshole (1514).
- 10 July – A royal visit to Scotland is interrupted by suffragettes: one attempts to reach the King and Queen's carriage at Dundee; and Rhoda Fleming leaps onto the footboard of the royal car at Perth; police protect her from an angry crowd.
- 26 July – Bachelor's Walk massacre: Troops of the King's Own Scottish Borderers fire on a crowd of nationalist protestors at Bachelors Walk, Dublin, killing three; a fourth man dies later from bayonet wounds and more than 30 others are injured.
- 30 July – Norwegian aviator Tryggve Gran makes the first crossing of the North Sea by aeroplane, flying from Cruden Bay to Jæren in Norway in the Blériot XI monoplane Ca Flotte.
- August – The British Royal Navy's Grand Fleet is formed in Scapa Flow.
- 4 August – World War I: Declaration of war by the United Kingdom on the German Empire.
- 9 August – World War I: Light cruiser HMS Birmingham (1913) rams and sinks Imperial German Navy submarine U-15 off Fair Isle, the first U-boat claimed by the Royal Navy.
- 28 August–28 September – World War I: German spy Carl Hans Lody is operating from Edinburgh.
- September – World War I
  - Revolutionary socialist teacher John Maclean holds his first anti-war rally, on Glasgow Green.
  - Rumours spread that Russian troops, landed on the east coast of Scotland, have passed on trains through Britain en route to the Western Front.
- 5 September – World War I: Scout cruiser HMS Pathfinder (1904) is sunk by German submarine U-21 in the Firth of Forth with loss of all but nine of her crew, the first ship ever to be sunk by a locomotive torpedo fired from a submarine.
- 8 September – Armed merchant cruiser HMS Oceanic runs aground on the Shaalds o' Foula and is lost.
- 14 September – World War I: Scottish soldiers William Henry Johnston, Ross Tollerton and George Wilson are awarded the Victoria Cross in separate actions on the Western Front.
- 26 September – World War I: the 15th (Scottish) Infantry Division, newly formed as part of Kitchener's Army, first parades as a unit.
- 15 October – World War I: Protected cruiser HMS Hawke (1891) is torpedoed by German submarine U-9 off Aberdeen, sinking in under ten minutes with the loss of 524 crew and only seventy survivors.
- 16/17 October – World War I: Scare of submarine attack in Scapa Flow causes the Grand Fleet to disperse while the anchorage is secured.
- 22 October – World War I: Glaswegian Private Henry May, a regular soldier with 1st Battalion, The Cameronians (Scottish Rifles) at La Boutillerie, is awarded the Victoria Cross for rescuing wounded comrades.
- 3 November – Trawler Ivanhoe, requisitioned as an armed patrol vessel, strikes the Black Rock near Leith while minelaying and sinks.
- 23 November – World War I: German submarine U-18 is intercepted and forced to scuttle while attempting to enter Scapa Flow.
- 25 November – World War I: sixteen Heart of Midlothian F.C. players enlist en masse – seven will die in action before the war ends.
- St Andrew's Cathedral, Aberdeen, raised to the status of cathedral within the Episcopal Church.
- A. & R. Scott introduce the brand name Scott's Porage Oats.

== Births ==
- 1 January – Alexander Reid, playwright (died 1982)
- 13 March – Kay Tremblay, film actress, living in Canada (died 2005 in Stratford, Ontario)
- 26 May – Archie Duncan, actor (died 1979)
- 14 June – Alexander Buchanan Campbell, architect (died 2007)
- 14 June – Ruthven Todd, poet, artist and novelist (died October 1978 in Spain)
- 25 June – Matthew McDiarmid, literary scholar, essayist, campaigning academic and poet (died 1996)
- 15 July – Gavin Maxwell, naturalist and writer (died 1969)
- 4 November – Duncan Macrae, international rugby union player (died 2007)
- 20 December – Robert Colquhoun, painter, printmaker and theatre set designer (died 1962 in London)
- 29 December – Tom Weir, climber, naturalist and broadcaster (died 2006)
- Richard Scott, general practitioner and academic (died 1983)
- Ann Scott-Moncrieff, author (died 1943)

== Deaths ==
- 1 March – Gilbert Elliot-Murray-Kynynmound, 4th Earl of Minto, soldier and colonial administrator (born 1845 in London)
- 16 March – Sir John Murray, oceanographer, marine biologist and limnologist (born 1841 in Canada)
- 31 March – William Henry Oliphant Smeaton, writer, journalist, editor, historian and educator (born in 1856)
- 26 June – Edward Calvert, domestic architect (born 1847 in Brentford)
- 30 September – Sir Henry Littlejohn, forensic surgeon (born 1826)
- 21 October – James William Cleland, Liberal Party MP for Glasgow Bridgeton (1906–10) (born 1874)
- 19 December – William Bruce, soldier, posthumous recipient of the Victoria Cross (born 1890; killed in action near Givenchy)
- 25 December – Donald MacKinnon, Celtic scholar (born in 1839)

== The arts ==
- 16 March – the Usher Hall opens in Edinburgh as a concert hall.
- John MacDougall Hay's novel Gillespie is published.
- Bandmaster Frederick J. Ricketts ('Kenneth J. Alford') composes the "Colonel Bogey March" while serving with the Argyll and Sutherland Highlanders at Fort George.

== See also ==
- Timeline of Scottish history
- 1914 in Ireland
