= Robert Stewart (designer) =

Scottish designer

Robert Stewart (14 April 1924 – February 1995) was a Scottish designer. He worked in many media but was primarily known for his textile designs. He was a contemporary of Lucienne Day and together they pioneered modern British textile design after the war. He taught at the Glasgow School of Art for 35 years.
