= 1847 in Scotland =

- Centuries: 17th; 18th; 19th; 20th; 21st
- Decades: 1820s; 1830s; 1840s; 1850s; 1860s
- See also: List of years in Scotland; Timeline of Scottish history 1847 in: The UK • Wales • Elsewhere

Events from the year 1847 in Scotland.

== Incumbents ==
=== Law officers ===
- Lord Advocate – Andrew Rutherfurd
- Solicitor General for Scotland – Thomas Maitland

=== Judiciary ===
- Lord President of the Court of Session and Lord Justice General – Lord Boyle
- Lord Justice Clerk – Lord Hope

== Events ==
- 28 April – the brig Exmouth carrying emigrants from Derry bound for Quebec is wrecked off Islay with only three survivors from more than 250 on board.
- May – The congregations of the United Secession Church unite with most of those of the Relief Church to form the United Presbyterian Church.
- 4 May – Glenalmond College opens its doors.
- 17 May – Edinburgh, Leith and Newhaven Railway extends through Scotland Street Tunnel to a new southern terminus in Princes Street, Edinburgh.
- 17 August – Queen Victoria arrives in HMY Victoria and Albert off Greenock at the start of a visit to Scotland.
- 18 September – Educational Institute of Scotland formally constituted as a teachers' union "for the purpose of promoting sound learning and of advancing the interests of education in Scotland".
- 4–8 November – James Young Simpson discovers the anaesthetic properties of chloroform and first uses it, successfully, on a patient, in an obstetric case in Edinburgh.
- 23 November – the Otago Association ship Philip Laing sets sail from Greenock carrying settlers, mostly from the Free Church of Scotland, bound for Port Chalmers in New Zealand.
- The Ordnance Survey confirms Ben Nevis as the highest mountain in the British Isles, ahead of Ben Macdui.
- Michael Nairn begins manufacture of floorcloth at Kirkcaldy.
- Thomas Guthrie publishes A Plea for Ragged Schools in Edinburgh.

== Births ==
- 29 January – John Ramsay, 13th Earl of Dalhousie, KT, Liberal politician, former Secretary for Scotland (died 1887)
- 8 February – Lord Francis Douglas, mountaineer (killed 1865 on the Matterhorn)
- 13 February – Sir Robert McAlpine, 1st Baronet, "Concrete Bob", founder of construction firm Sir Robert McAlpine (died 1934)
- 3 March – Alexander Graham Bell, scientist and inventor (died 1922 in Nova Scotia)
- 28 March – Robert Alan Mowbray Stevenson, art critic (died 1900)
- 27 April – Archibald Orr-Ewing, MP (died 1893)
- 2 July – Andrew Gray, physicist and mathematician (died 1925)
- 28 July – James Lindsay, 26th Earl of Crawford, politician, astronomer and bibliophile (died 1913)
- 3 August – John Hamilton-Gordon, 1st Marquess of Aberdeen and Temair, KT, GCMG, GCVO, PC, former Governor General of Canada (died 1934)
- 22 August – Alexander Mackenzie, composer (died 1935)
- 12 September – John Crichton-Stuart, 3rd Marquess of Bute, KT, landowner and Rector of the University of St Andrews (died 1900)

== Deaths ==
- 23 March – Archibald Simpson, architect (born 1790)
- 31 May – Thomas Chalmers, mathematician and a leader of the Free Church of Scotland (born 1780)
- 7 June – David Mushet, metallurgist (born 1772; died in Monmouth)
- 9 August – Andrew Combe, physician and phrenologist (born 1797)
- 29 August – William Simson, painter best known as a landscapist (born 1798 or 1799; died in London)
- 20 November – Henry Francis Lyte, Anglican divine and hymn-writer (born 1793; died in Nice)
- 7 December – Robert Liston, pioneering surgeon (born 1794; died in London)

== The arts ==
- R. M. Ballantyne returns to Edinburgh from Canada.
- Charles Lees paints The Golfers.
- The Sobieski Stuarts' fictional Tales of the Century: or Sketches of the romance of history between the years 1746 and 1846 is published.

== See also ==
- Timeline of Scottish history
- 1847 in Ireland
