= David Farquharson =

Scottish painter (1839–1907)

- Born: David Farquharson; 17 November 1839
- Died: 12 July 1907 (aged 67)

David Farquharson ARA (17 November 1839 – 12 July 1907) was a Scottish painter.

== Life ==
Farquharson was a Scottish landscapist. He was born in Blairgowrie, Perthshire, and lived there until he moved to Edinburgh about 1872. He was, to a great extent, a self-taught artist. He exhibited at the Royal Scottish Academy for the first time in 1868, and in 1882 was elected an associate, but in 1886 he settled in London until 1894.

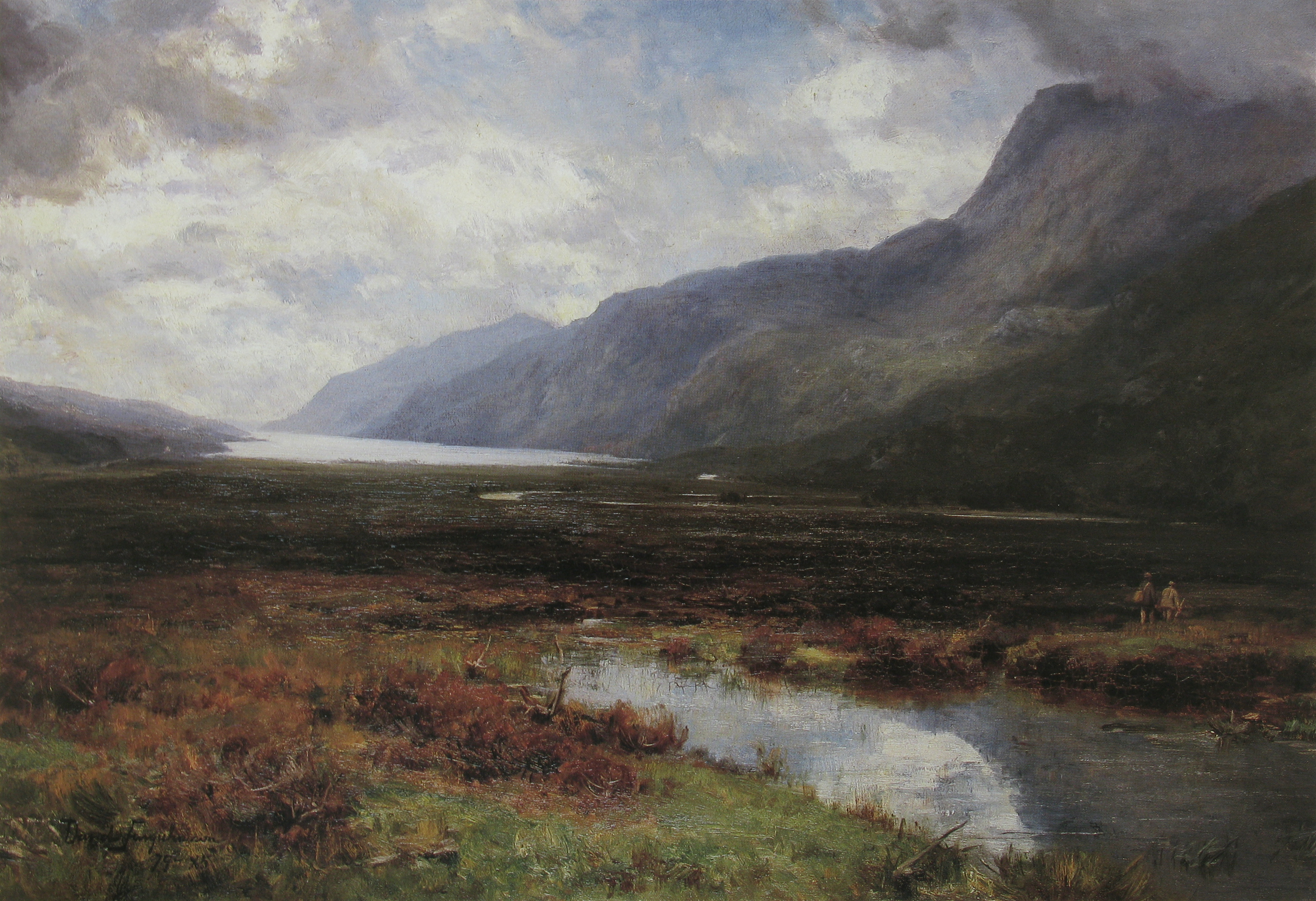
The End of the Day's Fishing

He removed to Sennen Cove, Cornwall, but often revisited Scotland. His landscapes attracted considerable attention and he exhibited at the Royal Academy from 1877 to 1904.

This led to his election as Associate in 1905 at the age of 66.

He painted the Highland hills and moors and peat mosses, river valleys and views in England and Holland, in all sorts of atmospheric conditions, in a tonal palette reminiscent of early Corot.

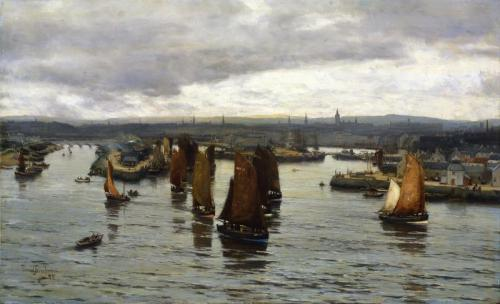
The Herring Fleet Leaving the Dee, Aberdeen (1888), Aberdeen Archives, Gallery and Museums

On 12 July 1907, he died at Balmore.
