= John Rennie (naval architect) =

British naval architect (1842–1918)

John Rennie (1842–1918) was a Scottish naval architect born in Stranraer.

Rennie became an apprentice shipwright on the Clyde at Govan but, determined to better himself, studied naval architecture in the evening. He worked in Dumbarton and Renfrew, before gaining the position of Chief Draughtsman with Scott & Linton at Dumbarton, where he worked on the clipper Cutty Sark under Hercules Linton. He was then appointed Naval Constructor and Instructor for the Chinese Government, working in Shanghai, a position he occupied for eight years. On returning to Scotland, he worked with the Ardrossan Dry Dock and Shipbuilding Company and then, for 19 years, with John Fullarton & Company at Paisley. During his career Rennie also designed various instruments used in shipbuilding. He died at Leith.
