= 1837 in Scotland =

- Centuries: 17th; 18th; 19th; 20th; 21st
- Decades: 1810s; 1820s; 1830s; 1840s; 1850s
- See also: List of years in Scotland; Timeline of Scottish history 1837 in: The UK • Wales • Elsewhere

Events from the year 1837 in Scotland.

== Incumbents ==
=== Law officers ===
- Lord Advocate – John Murray
- Solicitor General for Scotland – John Cunninghame; then Andrew Rutherfurd

=== Judiciary ===
- Lord President of the Court of Session and Lord Justice General – Lord Granton
- Lord Justice Clerk – Lord Boyle

== Events ==
- From beginning – Highland Destitution: 2 years of harvest failure leave many in the Highlands and Islands requiring aid.
- 3 April – the Paisley and Renfrew Railway is opened, a 4 ft 6 in gauge railway providing passenger services hauled by steam locomotives.
- 2 June – John O'Groat Journal newspaper first published in Wick, Caithness.
- 1 July – Isle of May disaster: A rowing boat carrying an excursion party from Cellardyke capsizes with the loss of 13 lives.
- 15 July – The Glasgow, Paisley, Kilmarnock and Ayr and Glasgow, Paisley and Greenock Railways are authorised.
- 18 October – William Perrie is hanged in Paisley for uxoricide.
- October – John Heathcoat's steam plough is demonstrated for the Highland Show near Dumfries.
- Cotton spinners' strike in Glasgow; the leaders will be sentenced to penal transportation.
- Robert Davidson produces a model battery-electric locomotive.
- Major reconstruction of Dornoch Cathedral by William Burn for the Duchess of Sutherland is completed.
- The capercaillie (Tetrao urogallus urogallus) is reintroduced to Scotland (Perthshire) from Sweden.
- William Forbes Skene's The Highlanders of Scotland: their Origin, History and Antiquities; with a sketch of their manners and customs, and an account of the clans into which they were divided, and of the state of society which existed among them is published by John Murray.

== Births ==
- 1 January – Hercules Linton, surveyor, designer, shipbuilder and antiquarian; designer of the Cutty Sark (died 1900)
- 7 January – James Key Caird, jute manufacturer and philanthropist (died 1916)
- January – Daniel Cottier, artist and designer (died 1891)
- 7 February – James Murray, lexicographer (died 1915 in Oxford)
- 16 February – Asher Asher, physician and promoter of Jewish causes (died 1889 in London)
- 1 March – Andrew Strath, golfer (died 1868)
- 24 March – George Henry Mackenzie, chess master (died 1891 in the United States)
- 25 March – Francis Farquharson, soldier, recipient of the Victoria Cross (died 1875 in England)
- 27 March – John MacWhirter, landscape painter (died 1911 in London)
- 3 May – Rev. Dr. Robert Blair, Presbyterian minister and Gaelic scholar (died 1907)
- 14 June – John Thomson, pioneering photographer, geographer and traveller (died 1921)
- 17 June – Alexander Skene, gynaecologist (died 1900 in the United States)
- 4 July – Agnes McLaren, physician (died 1913 in France)
- 8 July – Donald Dinnie, Highland games strongman (died 1916)
- 11 July – John Balfour, 1st Baron Kinross, lawyer and Liberal politician (died 1905)
- 10 November – William Bain Scarth, businessman and politician in Canada (died 1902 in Canada)
- 13 November – John McClure, admiral in the Imperial Chinese Navy (died 1920)
- 2 December – Joseph Bell, surgeon, an inspiration for Sherlock Holmes (died 1911)
- 17 December – William Harkness, astronomer (died 1903 in the United States)
- 29 December – Francis Carmichael Bruce, businessman and politician in Ontario (died 1928 in Canada)
- date unknown –
  - John Dudgeon, medical missionary (died 1901 in China)
  - Hughie Fraser, politician in South Australia (died 1900 in Australia)
  - David Greig, landowner
  - Eliza Newton, actress (died 1882 in the United States)
  - Douglas Argyll Robertson, ophthalmologist (died 1909)

== Deaths ==
- 4 or 11 January – John MacKenzie, physician and friend of Robert Burns
- 16 January – Robert Macnish, surgeon, physician, philosopher and writer (born 1802)
- 18 January – James St Clair-Erskine, 2nd Earl of Rosslyn, army officer, politician and freemason (born 1762 in England)
- 19 February – Sir Hugh Cleghorn, first colonial secretary to Ceylon (born 1752)
- 8 May – Robert Heriot Barclay, commander in the Royal Navy (born 1786)
- 1 August – Walter Geikie, painter (born 1795)
- 17 August – John Donald Carrick, journalist (born 1787)
- 24 August – George Watson, portrait painter (born 1767)
- 15 September – William Ritchie, physicist (born c. 1790)
- 22 October – Sir David Erskine, dramatist and antiquary (born 1772)
- 3 December – Charles Douglas, 6th Marquess of Queensberry, peer (born 1777) (Barony of Solway becomes extinct)
- 7 December – Robert Nicoll, radical journalist and poet (born 1814)

== See also ==
- 1837 in Ireland
