= 1838 in Scotland =

- Centuries: 17th; 18th; 19th; 20th; 21st
- Decades: 1810s; 1820s; 1830s; 1840s; 1850s
- See also: List of years in Scotland; Timeline of Scottish history 1838 in: The UK • Wales • Elsewhere

Events from the year 1838 in Scotland.

== Incumbents ==
=== Law officers ===
- Lord Advocate – John Murray
- Solicitor General for Scotland – Andrew Rutherfurd

=== Judiciary ===
- Lord President of the Court of Session and Lord Justice General – Lord Granton
- Lord Justice Clerk – Lord Boyle

== Events ==
- Winter 1837/38 – the Neolithic settlement of Rinyo on Rousay in Orkney is discovered.
- January – leaders of the Glasgow cotton spinners' strike are sentenced to penal transportation (but cleared of murder).
- 2 March – Clydesdale Bank founded in Glasgow.
- 4–22 April – Leith-built paddle steamer SS Sirius (1837) makes the transatlantic crossing from Cork to New York in eighteen days, though not using steam continuously.
- 1 May – Jenners department store established as drapers in Princes Street, Edinburgh.
- 21 May
  - Chartist meeting on Glasgow Green at which the People's Charter is launched.
  - Elizabeth Jeffrey of Carluke is hanged in Glasgow for poisoning a neighbour and a lodger.
- c. June – Robert Napier receives his first contract from the Admiralty, for supply of side-lever engines for installation in HM paddle sloops Vesuvius and Stromboli.
- 4 July – Edinburgh and Glasgow Railway authorised.
- 25 July – Caledonian Curling Club founded in Edinburgh.
- 4 August – the Court Journal prints a rumour that Archibald Montgomerie, 13th Earl of Eglinton, is going to host a great jousting tournament at his castle in Scotland. A few weeks later he confirms this.
- 16 August – Debtors (Scotland) Act 1838 passed.
- 7 September – Dundee paddle steamer Forfarshire (1834), homeward bound from Hull, is wrecked on the Farne Islands off the north east coast of England with the loss of more than 40 people; Grace Darling rescues nine survivors.
- The Hebridean islands of Barra and Benbecula are sold by the MacNeils and Ranald MacDonald respectively to Colonel Gordon of Cluny.
- Glen Ord Distillery established on the Black Isle.
- The Ordnance Survey commences the primary triangulation of Scotland.
- David Brewster originates the stereoscope.
- Royal Scottish Academy is granted its Royal charter.
- Floors Castle is remodelled in Scottish Baronial style by William Henry Playfair for James Innes-Ker, 6th Duke of Roxburghe.

== Births ==
- 13 January – William Miller, Free Church missionary and educationalist (died 1923)
- 29 January – David Gray, poet (died 1861)
- 22 February – John Joseph Jolly Kyle, chemist in Argentina (died 1922 in Buenos Aires)
- 14 March – Robert Flint, Theologian and philosopher (died 1910)
- 25 March – William Wedderburn, civil servant in India (died 1918 in England)
- 26 March – Alexander Crum Brown, organic chemist (died 1922)
- 21 April – John Muir, conservationist (died 1914 in the United States)
- 17 May – William Esson, mathematician (died 1916 in England)
- 6 June – Thomas Blake Glover, merchant (died 1911 in Japan)
- 6 July – Thomas John MacLagan, doctor and pharmacologist (died 1903)
- 7 July – Thomas Davidson, poet (died 1870)
- 22 July – John McLagan, newspaper publisher (died 1901 in Canada)
- 6 August – Walter Shirlaw, artist in the United States (died 1909 in Spain)
- 3 September – David Bowman, botanist (died 1868 in Colombia)
- 4 September – William Gibson Sloan, Plymouth Brethren evangelist (died 1914 in the Faroe Islands)
- 6 September – George Ashdown Audsley, architect, artist, illustrator, writer, decorator and pipe organ designer (died 1925 in the United States)
- 9 September – Thomas Barker, mathematician (died 1907 in England)
- 10 October – William M'Intosh, physician and marine zoologist (died 1931)
- 16 October – John Smart, landscape painter (died 1899)
- 2 November – James Dykes Campbell, merchant and writer (died 1895)
- 4 November – Andrew Martin Fairbairn, theologian (died 1912 in England)
- 18 November – William Keith, landscape painter in California (died 1911 in the United States)
- John Firth, Orcadian folklorist (died 1922)
- Alexander Mackenzie, historian, author, magazine editor and politician (died 1898)
- Samuel McGaw recipient of the Victoria Cross, during the First Ashanti Expedition (died in 1878)
- Bruce James Talbert, interior designer (died 1881 in England)

== Deaths ==
- 30 March – Thomas Balfour, politician (born 1810)
- 12 July – John Jamieson, lexicographer (born 1759)
- 27 July – David Hume, advocate (born 1757)
- 1 October – Charles Tennant, chemist and industrialist (born 1768)
- 7 November – Anne Grant, poet and author (born 1755)
- 16 November – Robert Cutlar Fergusson, lawyer and politician (born 1768)

== The arts ==
- 31 August – scene painter David Roberts sets sail for Egypt to produce a series of drawings of the region for use as the basis for paintings and chromolithographs.
- November – Johann Strauss I and his orchestra visit Edinburgh and Glasgow.
- Alexander and John Bethune publish Tales and Sketches of the Scottish Peasantry.
- Angus MacKay publishes A Collection of Ancient Piobaireachd or Highland Bagpipe Music.

== See also ==
- 1838 in Ireland
