= 1842 in Scotland =

- Centuries: 17th; 18th; 19th; 20th; 21st
- Decades: 1820s; 1830s; 1840s; 1850s; 1860s
- See also: List of years in Scotland; Timeline of Scottish history 1842 in: The UK • Wales • Elsewhere

Events from the year 1842 in Scotland.

== Incumbents ==
=== Law officers ===
- Lord Advocate – Sir William Rae, Bt until October; then Duncan McNeill
- Solicitor General for Scotland – Duncan McNeill; then Adam Anderson

=== Judiciary ===
- Lord President of the Court of Session and Lord Justice General – Lord Boyle
- Lord Justice Clerk – Lord Hope

== Events ==
- 3 January – 3rd Scottish Convention of Chartists opens in Glasgow.
- 21 February – Edinburgh and Glasgow Railway opened.
- 29 April – New Market opened in Aberdeen.
- May – the General Assembly of the Church of Scotland makes a "Claim of Rights" (drafted by Alexander Colquhoun-Stirling-Murray-Dunlop) asserting the church's independence of state control in spiritual matters.
- 1 September – Queen Victoria arrives by sea at Granton, Edinburgh, to start her first visit to Scotland.
- September – Robert Davidson's experimental battery-electric locomotive Galvani is demonstrated on the Edinburgh and Glasgow Railway.
- The Sobieski Stuarts' Vestiarium Scoticum is published in Edinburgh, purporting to be a reproduction from an old manuscript illustrating traditional Scottish clan tartan dress.
- A velocipede rider from Dumfriesshire, perhaps Kirkpatrick Macmillan, knocks down a pedestrian in the Gorbals district of Glasgow.
- James Shanks patents and begins to produce the pony-drawn lawn mower.
- Glasgow Botanic Gardens moves to its current location.
- Carnoustie Golf Links opened.

== Births ==
- 16 April – Laidlaw Purves, surgeon and golfer (died 1917 in England)
- 1 May – David Boyle, archaeologist in Canada (died 1911)
- 27 June – Jamie Anderson, golfer (died 1905)
- 20 September – James Dewar chemist and physicist (died 1923)
- 12 October – Robert Gillespie Reid, railway contractor in Canada (died 1908)

== Deaths ==
- 28 April – Charles Bell, surgeon, anatomist, neurologist and philosophical theologian (born 1774)
- 31 May – James Fergusson, judge (born 1769)
- 12 December – Robert Haldane, theologian (born 1764 in London)
- 24 December – Adam Gillies, Lord Gillies, judge (born 1760)

== See also ==
- Timeline of Scottish history
- 1842 in Ireland
