= Robert Maxwell (writer) =

Robert Maxwell (1696–1766) was a Scottish writer on agriculture.

He was born in Kirkcudbrightshire. He was an active member of the Society of Improvers in the Knowledge of Agriculture in Scotland.

He published books including The Practical Husbandman, being a Collection of Miscellaneous Papers on Husbandry (1757) and The Practical Beemaster (1747).
