= 1843 in Scotland =

- Centuries: 17th; 18th; 19th; 20th; 21st
- Decades: 1820s; 1830s; 1840s; 1850s; 1860s
- See also: List of years in Scotland; Timeline of Scottish history 1843 in: The UK • Wales • Elsewhere

Events from the year 1843 in Scotland.

== Incumbents ==
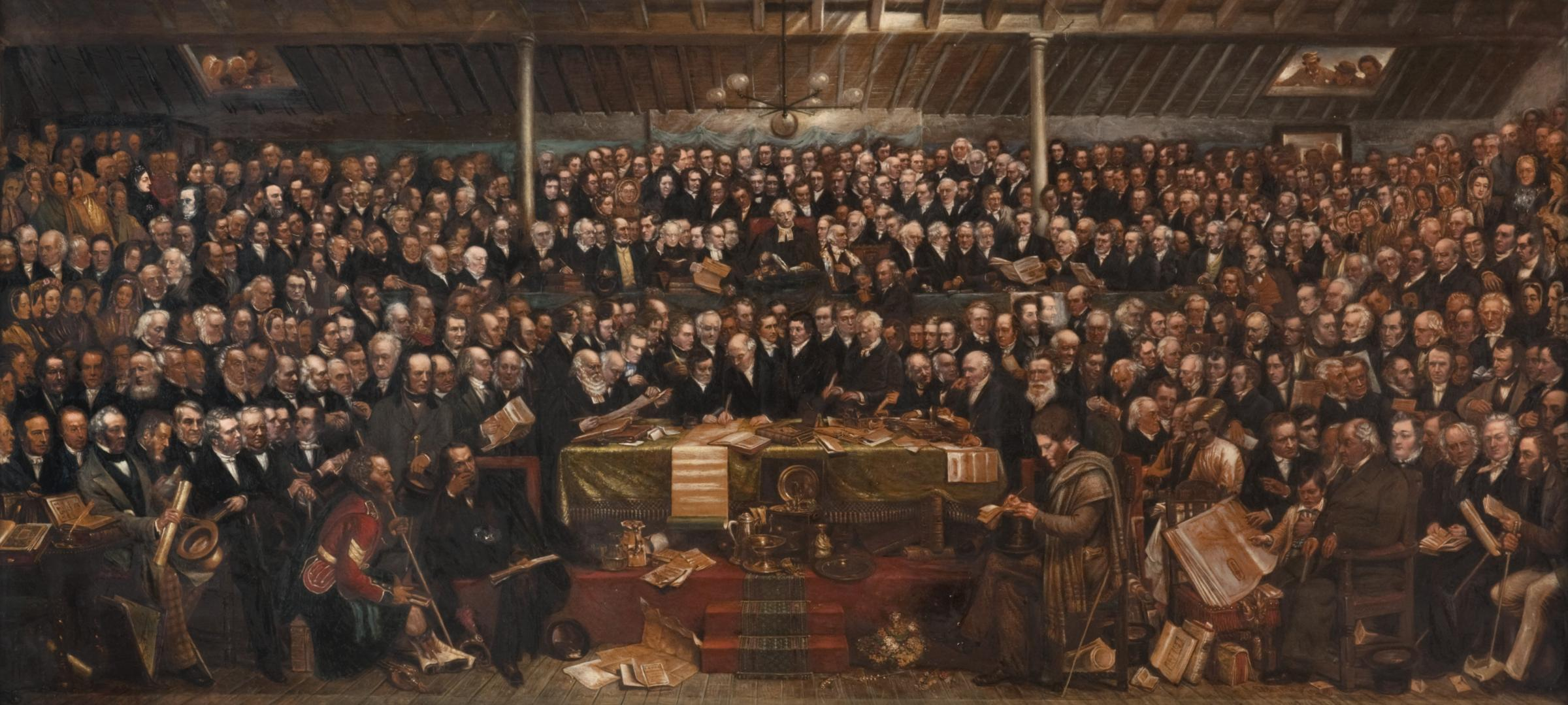
The Disruption Assembly, painted by David Octavius Hill

=== Law officers ===
- Lord Advocate – Duncan McNeill
- Solicitor General for Scotland – Adam Anderson

=== Judiciary ===
- Lord President of the Court of Session and Lord Justice General – Lord Boyle
- Lord Justice Clerk – Lord Hope

== Events ==
- 18 May – the Disruption of the Church of Scotland takes place. Construction of the Triple Kirks in Aberdeen begins.
- 3 June – first burial in Warriston Cemetery, Edinburgh.
- 29 June – Robert Napier launches his first iron ship, the paddle steamer Vanguard, from his new yard at Govan on the River Clyde.
- 1 July – Union Bank of Scotland opens in Glasgow.
- 13 August – Sir William Dunbar, priest of St. Paul's Chapel, Aberdeen, is excommunicated from the Scottish Episcopal Church for refusing to administer or receive the sacrament in accordance with the church's ritual.
- Dingwall becomes the county town of Ross and Cromarty.
- The last laird of Raasay, John Macleod, emigrates to Tasmania having sold the Scottish island to George Rainy to help clear his debts.
- The Ordnance Survey commences its first published mapping of Scotland with a survey of Wigtownshire.
- The Glenmorangie distillery is established in Tain by William Matheson.
- Glenburn Hydro is opened in Rothesay, Bute, the first hydropathic establishment in Scotland.
- First paddle steamer on Loch Katrine, Gypsy.
- Little Ross lighthouse completed.
- Angus MacKay becomes first Piper to the Sovereign.
- Marion Kirkland Reid's feminist tract A Plea for Woman is published in Edinburgh.

== Births ==
- 12 June – David Gill, astronomer known for measuring astronomical distances, for astrophotography, and for geodesy (died 1914)
- 5 August – James Scott Skinner, dancing master, fiddler and composer (died 1927)
- 21 August – Thomas Hill Jamieson, librarian (died 1876)

== Deaths ==
- 25 July – Charles Macintosh, chemist and inventor of waterproof fabrics after whom the Mackintosh raincoat is named (born 1766)
- 5 December – David Hamilton, architect (born 1768)

== The arts ==
- Hill & Adamson form Scotland's first photographic studio, on Calton Hill in Edinburgh.

== See also ==
- Timeline of Scottish history
- 1843 in Ireland
