= Robert Forsyth (writer) =

Scottish writer (1766–1845)

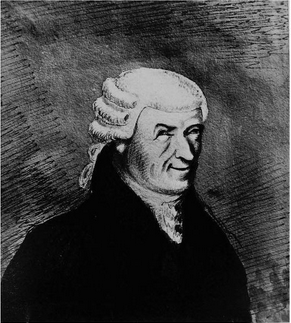
Robert Forsyth by Robert Scott Moncrieff

Robert Forsyth (1766–1845) was a Scottish writer, best known for his five-volume work The Beauties of Scotland.

== Early life ==
Forsyth was born in Biggar, Lanarkshire, on 18 January 1766, the son of Robert Forsyth, a gravedigger, and Marion Pairman. His parents were poor, but gave him a good education, with a view to making him a minister. Forsyth entered Glasgow College at the age of fourteen, and obtained a license as a probationer of the Church of Scotland (a candidate for minister, serving a required probationary period).

== Careers ==
Forsyth gained considerable popularity as a probationer, but with no influence, he grew tired of waiting for a parish. He tried to start a career in law, but met with resistance, possibly due to his humble origins. The fact that he was a licentiate of the Church was held as an objection to his being admitted to the bar. Refused by the Faculty of Advocates, he petitioned the court of session for redress. The court ruled that to be admitted to the bar, Forsyth would have to resign his office of licentiate, but after he did so the Faculty continued to refuse his admission.

In 1792, Forsyth finally won admission as an advocate, after a judgment of Lord-President Campbell persuaded the Faculty to give way. However, he was unable to succeed in law; having fraternised with the "friends of the people", he was looked upon with suspicion as a "revolutionist".

With few prospects in the legal profession, Forsyth turned next to literature, and managed to make a living by writing for booksellers. He contributed to the Encyclopædia Britannica from 1802 to 1803, including the "Agriculture", "Asia", and "Britain" articles. He also tried poetry, politics, and philosophy, but with little success. Finally he was able to obtain a fair practice at the bar, where his self-described "great fits of application" earned him some success.

== Written works ==
Reflecting his varied professional experiences, Forsyth's chief works include Principles and Practice of Agriculture (2 vols. 1804), The Principles of Moral Science (vol. i. 1805), Political Fragments (1830), and Observations on the Book of Genesis (1846). However, his best-known work is The Beauties of Scotland (5 vols. 1805–8), which still maintains some popularity today, due in part to the many engravings which it contains of Scottish towns and places of interest.

At age seventy-six, Forsyth – reflecting his continuing loyalty to the Church – published a pamphlet entitled Remarks on the Church of Scotland, &c (1843). This work was reviewed critically by Hugh Miller, then editor of the Witness, who ridiculed Forsyth's remarks in the pamphlet as well as some of his past speculations on philosophy (several of which bear similarities to commonly accepted current views). For example, Forsyth once noted: "Whatever has no tendency to improvement will gradually pass away and disappear for ever", hinting at the now-commonplace concept of the survival of the fittest. In addition, Forsyth wrote: "Let it never be forgotten then for whom immortality is reserved. It is appointed as the portion of those who are worthy of it, and they shall enjoy it as a natural consequence of their worth." This view seems to parallel the doctrine of conditional immortality now held by many Christians. At the time, however, Hugh Miller said ironically of these views: "It was reserved for this man of high philosophic intellect to discover, early in the present century, that, though there are some souls that live for ever, the great bulk of souls are as mortal as the bodies to which they are united, and perish immediately after, like the souls of brutes."

Forsyth died in Edinburgh on 30 September 1845.
