= 2015 in Scotland =

- Centuries: 19th; 20th; 21st
- Decades: 1990s; 2000s; 2010s; 2020s
- See also: List of years in Scotland; Timeline of Scottish history 2015 in: The UK • England • Wales • Elsewhere; Scottish football: 2014–15 • 2015–16; 2015 in Scottish television

Events from the year 2015 in Scotland.

== Incumbents ==
- First Minister and Keeper of the Great Seal – Nicola Sturgeon
- Secretary of State for Scotland – Alistair Carmichael, until 8 May; David Mundell

=== Law officers ===
- Lord Advocate – Frank Mulholland
- Solicitor General for Scotland – Lesley Thomson
- Advocate General for Scotland – Lord Wallace of Tankerness; then Lord Keen of Elie

=== Judiciary ===
- Lord President of the Court of Session and Lord Justice General – Lord Gill until 31 May; vacant until 18 December; then Lord Carloway
- Lord Justice Clerk – Lord Carloway
- Chairman of the Scottish Land Court – Lord Minginish

== Events ==
=== January ===
- 3 January – Eight people are reported missing after cargo ship MV Cemfjord capsizes in the Pentland Firth.
- 9 January – Hurricane-force winds cause travel disruption and leave tens of thousands of homes without power across Scotland.

=== February ===
- 18 February – Cargo ship MV Lysblink Seaways runs aground near Ardnamurchan Point on a voyage from Belfast, Northern Ireland to Skogn, Norway. Her crew remain on board and she is refloated on 20 February but declared a constructive total loss and scrapped.

=== March ===
- 22 March – Membership of the Scottish National Party officially crosses the 100,000 mark; meaning that 1 in every 50 people in Scotland is now a member.
- 31 March – RAF Leuchars transfers to Army control as Leuchars Station.

=== April ===
- 1 April – Abellio ScotRail take over the ScotRail franchise, previously operated by First ScotRail. The Caledonian Sleeper service is split off into a separate franchise, now operated by Serco.
- 2 April – The only UK general election televised leaders debate to include Prime Minister David Cameron is broadcast by ITV. The debate features the leaders of the Conservatives, Labour, the Liberal Democrats, UKIP, the Greens, the Scottish National Party and Plaid Cymru.
- 11 April – The wedding of Scottish tennis star Andy Murray to his long-term partner Kim Sears takes place in Dunblane.
- April–June – Medical services begin to transfer to the new Queen Elizabeth University Hospital on the site of the former Southern General Hospital at Govan, Glasgow.

=== May ===
- 7 May – At the UK general election, the Scottish National Party wins 56 out of the 59 seats in Scotland, making them the largest political party by both number of seats and popular vote. Only three seats are retained by pro-union parties:
  - Orkney and Shetland, by Alistair Carmichael of the Liberal Democrats;
  - Edinburgh South, by Ian Murray of Labour;
  - Dumfriesshire, Clydesdale and Tweeddale, by David Mundell of the Conservatives.
  - In addition, Mhairi Black of the Scottish National Party, at twenty years of age, becomes the youngest elected MP since prior to the Reform Act 1832. Black is also the first person elected to Parliament under the provisions of the Electoral Administration Act 2006 which reduced the minimum age of candidacy from 21 to 18 years of age. She has unseated the then-Shadow Foreign Secretary, Douglas Alexander, 47 years old at the time of the election.
- 16 May
  - The Church of Scotland votes to allow the ordination of gay ministers in civil partnerships.
  - Jim Murphy announces his resignation as Leader of the Scottish Labour Party after the party's poor performance at the 2015 general election.

=== June ===
- 25 June – Scotland's population grew by 19,900 to reach 5,347,600 in 2014 according to the Office for National Statistics (ONS).

=== July ===
- 5 July – UNESCO gives World Heritage status to the Forth Bridge, one of Scotland's best-known structures.

=== August ===
- August – City of Glasgow College, Riverside Campus, designed by Michael Laird Architects and Reiach and Hall Architects, opens to students.
- 15 August – Kezia Dugdale becomes the new Leader of the Scottish Labour Party.

=== September ===
- 6 September – Rail transport returns to the Scottish Borders after 46 years with the reopening of the Waverley Route between Edinburgh and Tweedbank, under the name of the Borders Railway.

=== October ===
- 14 October – A train collides with a vehicle near Uphall in West Lothian, but the passengers are unharmed.
- 16 October – First Minister Nicola Sturgeon announces to the annual SNP conference that party membership now stands at 114,221.
- 22 October – The voting rights of Scottish MPs are to be restricted after the Conservative-majority UK Government wins a vote on its controversial "English votes for English laws" (EVEL) plans.
- 29 October – A 16-year-old youth is detained by Police Scotland after a fellow pupil is stabbed to death at Cults Academy near Aberdeen.
- 31 October – A motorist dies and ten people are taken to hospital with injuries after a car collides with a bus near West Kilbride.

=== November ===
- 12–13 November – Storm Abigail, the first official winter storm named in the British Isles, is at its peak across Scotland.
- 24 November – A Scottish National Party motion opposing the renewal of Trident is defeated in the UK Parliament by 330 votes to 64, with most Labour MPs abstaining.

=== December ===
- 1 December – Report of discovery of fossilised dinosaur footprints on Skye.
- 2 December – Despite the fact Scottish MPs vote by 57 to 2 against UK air strikes in Syria, the UK Parliament overall votes by 397 to 223 in favour of air strikes.
- 4 December – The Forth Road Bridge is closed due to structural defects, and the Scottish Transport Minister, Derek Mackay, declares that it will not be reopened until January 2016.
- 5–6 December – Peak of Storm Desmond, with heavy rain and strong winds, causing flooding across southern Scotland.
- 9 December – Election Court decides that although Liberal Democrat Alistair Carmichael had told a "blatant lie" in a TV interview, it had not been proven beyond reasonable doubt that he had committed an "illegal practice" that would invalidate his election as the Member of Parliament for Orkney and Shetland.
- 22 December – It is announced that the Forth Road Bridge will reopen for all vehicles except HGVs on Wednesday 23 December, ahead of schedule.
- 30 December – A section of the A93 west of Ballater collapses due to flooding caused by Storm Frank.
- 31 December – More than 1,700 same-sex couples have married in the first year after Scotland became the seventeenth country in the world to legalise same-sex marriage.

== Deaths ==
- 17 February – George Mackie, Baron Mackie of Benshie, Liberal Democrat peer and politician (born 1919).
- 2 March – Dave Mackay, football manager (born 1934).
- 10 March – John Howard Wilson, rugby union player (born 1930).
- 19 April – Tom McCabe, Labour politician (born 1954).
- 2 May – Ryan McHenry, film director and social media personality (born 1987).
- 15 May – Flora MacNeil, singer in Scottish Gaelic (born 1928).
- 1 June – Charles Kennedy, Liberal Democrat politician and former party leader (born 1959).
- 11 June – Ian McKechnie, footballer (Hull City) (born 1941).
- 21 June – Jim Rowan, footballer (born 1934).
- 22 June – James Carnegie, 3rd Duke of Fife, nobleman (born 1929).
- 23 June – Jack Asher, shinty player and referee (born 1927).
- 5 July – Joseph McKenzie, photographer (born 1929).
- 17 July – John McCluskey, boxer (born 1944).
- 29 August – Graham Leggat, footballer (born 1934).
- 8 October – Jim Diamond, singer and songwriter (born 1951).
- 21 October
  - William Murray, 8th Earl of Mansfield and Mansfield, nobleman and politician (born 1930).
  - Ian Steel, cyclist (born 1928).
- 5 December
  - Peter Cochrane, soldier and publisher (born 1919)
  - William McIlvanney, novelist, short story writer and poet (born 1936).

== The arts ==
- 5 November – Graeme Macrae Burnet's novel His Bloody Project is published in Glasgow
- Kathryn Joseph's album Bones You Have Thrown Me, And Blood I've Spilled is released
- The following works by Scottish poets are published
  - Iain Banks – Poems
  - Thomas Clark – Intae the Snaw
  - Robin Fulton – A Northern Habitat: Collected Poems 1960-2010
  - Kathleen Jamie – The Bonniest Companie
  - Don Paterson – 40 Sonnets

== See also ==
- 2015 in England
- 2015 in Northern Ireland
- 2015 in Wales
