= John Howard Wilson =

Scotland international rugby union player

- Born: John Howard Wilson; 3 March 1930 Boghall Farm, Midlothian, Scotland
- Died: 10 March 2015 (aged 85) Whim House, West Linton, Borders

Rugby union career
- Position: Prop
Amateur team(s)
| Years | Team | Apps | (Points) |
- British Army of the Rhine
| – | Watsonians | | |
| – | Howe of Fife | | |
Provincial / State sides
| Years | Team | Apps | (Points) |
- Edinburgh District
International career
| Years | Team | Apps | (Points) |
| 1953 | Scotland | 1 | (0) |

John Howard Wilson (3 March 1930 – 10 March 2015) was a Scottish and British sportsman who played international rugby union for Scotland. He also played representative rugby union for Edinburgh and the British Army of the Rhine.

== Early life ==
Howard was born at Boghall farm in the Pentland Hills in Midlothian on 3 March 1930. His father was Professor Adam Stewart Brown Wilson, who managed the farm for the University of Edinburgh and his mother was Lilias Glendinning Wilson (née Taylor). He was the second of four children and was educated at George Watsons College in Edinburgh.

== Rugby career ==
He played for the George Watsons first xv whilst at school and during national service from 1948 to 1950 (based in Hameln, Germany) he played for the British Army of the Rhine. On returning to the UK he played representatively for Edinburgh in 1951 and 1952.

He was capped just once for the Scotland national rugby union team. His only Test came against Ireland on 28 February at Murrayfield stadium in Edinburgh in the 1953 Five Nations Championship. On return to Scotland in 1958 he played for Watsonians and Howe of Fife.

== Later life ==
In 1955 Howard moved to Tanganyika to work as an agriculturalist for the UK government. It was there he met his wife Shiela Mary Brooke, a nurse with whom he had two daughters and a son. Moving back to Scotland in 1958 he lived in Edinburgh and worked predominantly in agriculture. Howard died after a short illness at Whim House, West Linton on 10 March 2015.
