= 1846 in Scotland =

- Centuries: 17th; 18th; 19th; 20th; 21st
- Decades: 1820s; 1830s; 1840s; 1850s; 1860s
- See also: List of years in Scotland; Timeline of Scottish history 1846 in: The UK • Wales • Elsewhere

Events from the year 1846 in Scotland.

== Incumbents ==
=== Law officers ===
- Lord Advocate – Duncan McNeill until July; then Andrew Rutherfurd
- Solicitor General for Scotland – Adam Anderson; then Thomas Maitland

=== Judiciary ===
- Lord President of the Court of Session and Lord Justice General – Lord Boyle
- Lord Justice Clerk – Lord Hope

== Events ==
- January – African American abolitionist Frederick Douglass arrives in Scotland from Ireland to continue his speaking tour of the United Kingdom.
- 22 June – the North British Railway is opened to public traffic between Edinburgh and Berwick-upon-Tweed, the first line to cross the border between Scotland and England. Edinburgh Waverley railway station is opened.
- 15 August – inauguration of Scott Monument in Edinburgh.
- 21 December – Scottish-born surgeon Robert Liston carries out the first operation under anesthesia in Europe, at University College Hospital in London.
- Start of Highland Potato Famine.
- English tourism pioneer Thomas Cook brings 350 people from Leicester on a tour of Scotland.
- Lighthouses at Covesea Skerries, Chanonry Point and Cromarty (all designed by Alan Stevenson) first illuminated.
- New College, Edinburgh, opens its doors as a theological training college for the Free Church of Scotland.
- Catherine Murray, Countess of Dunmore, commissions "the Paisley Sisters" of Strond on Harris to weave tweed in the Clan Murray tartan, origin of the commercial Harris Tweed industry.
- Engineer Robert William Thomson is granted his first patent for a pneumatic tyre, in France.
- 14-year-old James Clerk Maxwell's first scientific paper is presented to the Royal Society of Edinburgh.
- The John Dewar & Sons company is created by John Dewar Sr. and his sons
- Charles William George St John's Short Sketches of the Wild Sports and Natural History of the Highlands is published.

== Births ==
- 1 January – Edward Pinnington, art historian, biographer and journalist (died 1921)
- 10 February – James Burns, shipowner (died 1923 in Australia)
- 28 February – John F. McIntosh, steam locomotive engineer (died 1918)
- 21 June – Marion Adams-Acton ("Jeanie Hering"), born Marion Jean Hamilton, novelist (died 1928 in London)

== Deaths ==
- 12 February – Henry Duncan, minister, geologist and social reformer (born 1774)
- 23 May – Charles Ewart, soldier (born 1769)
- Andrew Innes, last survivor of the Buchanites

== The arts ==
- William Motherwell's Poetical Works are published posthumously.
- Carolina, Lady Nairne's Lays from Strathern are published posthumously, revealing her authorship. This includes the Jacobite song "The Hundred Pipers".

== See also ==
- Timeline of Scottish history
- 1846 in Ireland
