= 1844 in Scotland =

- Centuries: 17th; 18th; 19th; 20th; 21st
- Decades: 1820s; 1830s; 1840s; 1850s; 1860s
- See also: List of years in Scotland; Timeline of Scottish history 1844 in: The UK • Wales • Elsewhere

Events from the year 1844 in Scotland.

== Incumbents ==
=== Law officers ===
- Lord Advocate – Duncan McNeill
- Solicitor General for Scotland – Adam Anderson

=== Judiciary ===
- Lord President of the Court of Session and Lord Justice General – Lord Boyle
- Lord Justice Clerk – Lord Hope

== Events ==
- 1 February – Skerryvore lighthouse first lit.
- 2 May – Commission of Enquiry set up to inquire into the system of poor relief in Scotland and suggest improvements delivers its report, leading to the Scottish Poor Law Act the following year.
- July – Glasgow Stock Exchange opens.
- 21 August – foundation stone of Political Martyrs' Monument in Old Calton Burial Ground on Calton Hill, Edinburgh, laid by Joseph Hume.
- 16 December – Edinburgh Stock Exchange formed.
- 28 October – the first paddlewheel Jackal-class gunvessel, HMS Jackal (or Jackall) is launched by Robert Napier at Govan on the River Clyde as the Royal Navy's first iron ship. It is followed a month later by its sister HMS Lizard.
- James Matheson purchases Isle of Lewis.
- North Rona is depopulated.
- The Sobieski Stuarts publish The Costume of the Clans. With observations upon the literature, arts, manufactures and commerce of the Highlands and Western Isles during the Middle Ages; and the influence of the sixteenth, seventeenth and eighteenth centuries upon their present condition.

== Births ==
- 8 May – William Alexander Hunter, academic lawyer and Liberal politician (died 1898)
- 11 May – William Wallace, philosopher (died 1897)
- Matthew Holmes, steam locomotive engineer (died 1903)
- Janet Milne Rae, née Gibb, novelist (died 1933)

== Deaths ==
- 6 March – George Meikle Kemp, designer of the (uncompleted) Scott Monument (born 1795) (drowned in the Union Canal)
- 13 June – Thomas Charles Hope, physician and chemist who discovered the element strontium (born 1766)
- 23 November – Thomas Henderson, first Astronomer Royal for Scotland (born 1798)

== See also ==
- Timeline of Scottish history
- 1844 in Ireland
