= 1848 in Scotland =

- Centuries: 17th; 18th; 19th; 20th; 21st
- Decades: 1820s; 1830s; 1840s; 1850s; 1860s
- See also: List of years in Scotland; Timeline of Scottish history 1848 in: The UK • Wales • Elsewhere

Events from the year 1848 in Scotland.

== Incumbents ==
=== Law officers ===
- Lord Advocate – Andrew Rutherfurd
- Solicitor General for Scotland – Thomas Maitland

=== Judiciary ===
- Lord President of the Court of Session and Lord Justice General – Lord Boyle
- Lord Justice Clerk – Lord Hope

== Events ==
- 15 February – the Caledonian Railway is opened to the public throughout between Edinburgh, Carstairs and Carlisle, completing a through rail route from London by the West Coast Main Line and providing the first service of through carriages between Scotland and England.
- March – the Glasgow, Paisley, Kilmarnock and Ayr Railway completes its Ballochmyle Viaduct, designed by John Miller. The main arch of 181 feet (55 m) span, carrying the rails 169 feet (52 m) above the River Ayr, is the world's longest masonry span. This section of line is opened to traffic on 9 August.
- 23 March – Scottish settlers on the John Wickliffe, captained by Edinburgh-born William Cargill, arrive at what will become Port Chalmers in the Otago region of New Zealand. Dunedin is established by the Lay Association of the Free Church of Scotland through the Otago Association.
- 22 May – the Scottish Central Railway opens to Perth, including the 1,220 yd (1,120 m) Moncrieff Tunnel on the southern approach to Perth.
- 19 August – Moray Firth fishing disaster: 100 fishermen lose their lives in a severe storm off the east coast.
- 8 September – Queen Victoria and Albert, Prince Consort, first visit Balmoral Castle.
- Road bridge at Ashiestiel over the River Tweed, built by J. & T. Smith of Darnick, is completed. The arch, a 132 feet (40 m) semi-ellipse with a rise of 26 feet (7.9 m), is the longest rubble masonry span at this date.
- Threipmuir Reservoir completed to serve Edinburgh.
- Dalmellington iron works opened.
- Scottish Building Society established as the Edinburgh Property Investment Company.
- Third cholera pandemic in Scotland, first breaking out in Edinburgh.
- Approximate date – The island of Handa is depopulated.

== Births ==
- 28 January – Mary Elizabeth Hawker ('Lanoe Falconer'), writer of short fiction (died 1908 in Herefordshire)
- 7 April – Randall Davidson, Archbishop of Canterbury (died 1930 in London)
- 10 May – Thomas Lipton, tea merchant and yachtsman (died 1931 in London)
- 25 July – Arthur Balfour, Conservative Prime Minister of the United Kingdom (died 1930 in Surrey)
- 12 August – Donald Swanson, Superintendent in the Metropolitan Police CID (died 1924 in Surrey)
- 30 September – Robert Walker Macbeth, painter (died 1910 in London)
- 28 October – Thomas Millie Dow, painter (died 1919 in St Ives, Cornwall)
- 17 November – Cathcart Wason, estate owner and member of parliament in both New Zealand and Britain (died 1921 in London)
- 2 December – Mary Slessor, missionary (died 1915 in Nigeria)
- James Porteous, agricultural engineer (died 1922 in the United States)

== Deaths ==
- 14 January – Robert Adamson, photographer (born 1821)
- 14 February – William Tennant, scholar and poet (born 1784)

== The arts ==
- 5 August–31 October – Polish pianist-composer Frédéric Chopin visits Scotland at the invitation of Jane Stirling, his last solo public performance being on 4 October in Edinburgh.
- William Edmondstoune Aytoun's poetry collection Lays of the Scottish Cavaliers is published in Edinburgh.
- Robert Davidson's poetry collection Leaves from a Peasant's Cottage Drawer is published in Edinburgh by James Hogg.

== See also ==
- Timeline of Scottish history
- 1848 in Ireland
