= 1841 in Scotland =

- Centuries: 17th; 18th; 19th; 20th; 21st
- Decades: 1820s; 1830s; 1840s; 1850s; 1860s
- See also: List of years in Scotland; Timeline of Scottish history 1841 in: The UK • Wales • Elsewhere

Events from the year 1841 in Scotland.

== Incumbents ==
=== Law officers ===
- Lord Advocate – Andrew Rutherfurd until September; then Sir William Rae, Bt
- Solicitor General for Scotland – Thomas Maitland; then Duncan McNeill

=== Judiciary ===
- Lord President of the Court of Session and Lord Justice General – Lord Granton until 20 July; then from 7 October Lord Boyle
- Lord Justice Clerk – Lord Boyle, then Lord Hope

== Events ==
- 29 March – the Glasgow, Paisley and Greenock Railway is opened between Glasgow Bridge Street railway station and Greenock.
- 14 May – Irish navvies Dennis Doolan and Patrick Redding are hanged at Crosshill, Bishopbriggs (near Glasgow and site of the later Cadder Yard), the location at which they participated in the murder of ganger John Green on the works of the Edinburgh and Glasgow Railway on 10 December 1840.
- 28 May – seven church ministers of the Presbytery of Strathbogie are removed from their posts by the General assembly of the Church of Scotland for obeying civil rather than ecclesiastical law.
- 6 June – United Kingdom Census taken across Scotland.
- September – Townhill waggonway opened in Fife.
- Autumn – Chartist leader Feargus O'Connor tours Scotland.
- The Edinburgh and Glasgow Railway opens Cowlairs railway works in the Springburn district of Glasgow.

== Births ==
- 8 January – Alexander Stuart Murray, archaeologist (died 1904)
- Murray Hall, born Mary Anderson, bail bondsman and politician in the United States (died 1901)

== Deaths ==
- 1 June – David Wilkie, painter (born 1785)

== The arts ==
- January – Franz Liszt visits Edinburgh and Glasgow.
- Publication of Vocal Melodies of Scotland including "The Bonnie Banks o' Loch Lomond".

== See also ==
- Timeline of Scottish history
- 1841 in Ireland
