= Bishopbriggs railway station =

Railway station in East Dunbartonshire, Scotland

Bishopbriggs Scottish Gaelic: Drochaid an Easbaig
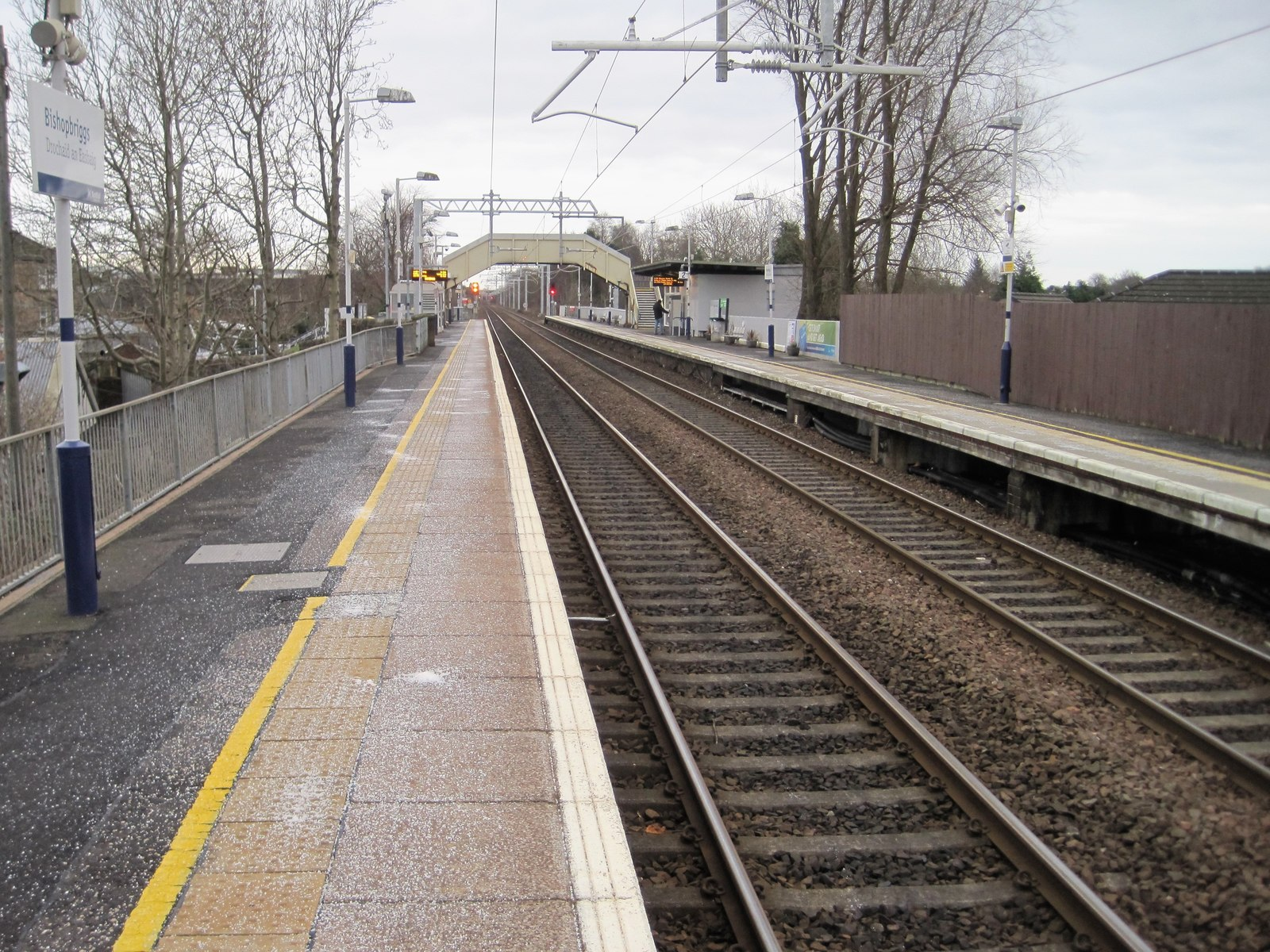
- The station in 2017

General information
- Location: Bishopbriggs, East Dunbartonshire; Scotland
- Coordinates: 55.9038°N 4.2249°W
- Grid reference: NS610701
- Manager: ScotRail
- Transit authority: SPT
- Platforms: 2

Other information
- Station code: BBG

History
- Original company: Edinburgh and Glasgow Railway
- Pre-grouping: North British Railway
- Post-grouping: London and North Eastern Railway

Key dates
- 21 February 1842: Opened

Passengers
- 2020/21: ▼0.164 million
- 2021/22: ▲0.421 million
- 2022/23: ▲0.544 million
- 2023/24: ▲0.670 million
- 2024/25: ▲0.759 million
Location
Notes
- Passenger statistics from the Office of Rail and Road

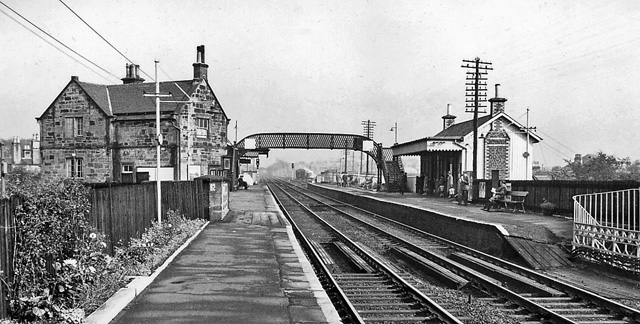
Bishopbriggs station in 1961

Bishopbriggs railway station is a railway station serving Bishopbriggs in East Dunbartonshire, Scotland. It is located on the Glasgow to Edinburgh via Falkirk Line, 3.25 miles (5.23 km) north of Glasgow Queen Street, but is currently only served by services on the Croy Line.

== History ==
Bishopbriggs was one of the original stations on the Edinburgh and Glasgow Railway, opened in 1842. During the 1960s, the station was scheduled for closure under the Beeching Axe but a local campaign managed to save it, although the original station buildings and footbridge were demolished. They were replaced by a modular ticket office and waiting room, as well as a new footbridge. The ticket office and waiting room was replaced with a modern glass and steel building in 2002, of a similar design to that at Croy railway station.

== Present day ==
There is no parking with very little provided on nearby streets.

Services are provided by ScotRail, primarily using Class 170 Turbostar trains, however Class 156 Super Sprinter and Class 158 Express Sprinter DMU's are also used. From 2019/ 2020 Hitachi Class 385's will operate most services with a few exceptions (peak time trains to Perth for example) as electrification will only go as far as Alloa and Dunblane.

During Glasgow Queen Street Tunnel works in summer 2016, trains served Glasgow Queen Street Low Level ran into Glasgow through Springburn calling additionally at Springburn and back to Bishopbriggs via Anniesland and Maryhill running non-stop.

The station was briefly featured in Bill Forsyth's 1980 film That Sinking Feeling.

== Future ==
Following a consultation a potential new station with Park and Ride facilities at Westerhill, (West end of the old Cadder Yard) has been identified.

In April 2015, the proposed Local Development Plan for Bishopbriggs and Torrance included a proposal for a new station at Westerhill, 2 km (1.2 mi) west of Bishopbriggs station, attached to the new Bishopbriggs Relief Road.

In February 2017, the published Local Development Plan for Kirkintilloch and Twechar included a marker for a potential railway station in the same location.

== Services ==
=== 2006/07 ===
- Mondays to Saturdays: there was generally a half-hour service southbound from Platform 2 to Glasgow Queen Street and northbound services from Platform 1 terminating alternately at Stirling or going onwards to Dunblane.

Change at Croy for Edinburgh or at Stirling for Alloa, Perth, Dundee, Aberdeen.

- Sundays: there was an hourly service in each direction.

=== From May 2008 ===
- Mondays to Saturdays: There is generally a half-hour service southbound from Platform 2 to Glasgow Queen Street and northbound from Platform 1 to Stirling with alternate services going onwards to Dunblane and Alloa, as a result of the completion of the Stirling-Alloa-Kincardine rail link.
- Sundays: There is an hourly service in each direction to Glasgow and Alloa.

=== 2017 ===
- Monday - Friday there is usually a half hourly service to both Glasgow Queen Street and Stirling, with one train an hour running from Stirling to Alloa and most other service extending to Dunblane calling at Bridge of Allan. There are a couple of peak services which extend beyond Dunblane to Perth and Dundee.
- Saturday, the same as Monday - Friday but with no peak extras
- Sunday, an hourly train to Glasgow Queen Street in one direction and Alloa in the other, Alloa service call at Lenzie, Croy, Larbert and Stirling

Preceding station	National Rail	Following station
Lenzie	ScotRail; Croy Line	Glasgow Queen Street
Lenzie	ScotRail; Glasgow–Edinburgh via Falkirk line	Glasgow Queen Street
	Historical railways	
Kirkintilloch (E&GR); Line open, station closed	North British Railway; Edinburgh and Glasgow Railway	Cowlairs; Line open, station closed
Lenzie; Line and station open	North British Railway; Edinburgh and Glasgow Railway	Cowlairs; Line open, station closed
