= Cowlairs train collision =

1850 train collision in Cowlairs, Scotland

Details
- Date: 1 August 1850
- Location: Cowlairs, Scotland
- Coordinates: 55°52′50″N 4°14′20″W
- Country: United Kingdom
- Operator: Edinburgh and Glasgow Railway
- Incident type: Collision
- Cause: Signal passed at danger; failure to protect

Statistics
- Trains: 2
- Deaths: 5
- Injured: 9

The Cowlairs train collision was an 1850 rear-end collision that resulted in the deaths of five passengers.

== Incident ==
On August 1, 1850, three trains were scheduled to arrive in succession at Cowlairs. The first and second trains had arrived at this point, but the second train was parked atop a rail crossover. The train began to reverse to clear space, but in doing this, the engineer made no effort to protect the rear of the train or alert the approaching third locomotive.

By the time the third train had approached, it was already too late. The third collided with the rear of the second train, which resulted in the deaths of 5 passengers, including a child. An additional 9 others were injured.

== Investigation ==
An official inquiry blamed multiple factors including fault on the railway company for allowing passenger overcrowding, and additional blame on the engineer of the second train for failing to send back any signals prior to reversing.
