= Corncockle Quarry =

Sandstone quarry in Dumfries and Galloway, Scotland

Coordinates: 55.1695°N 3.4354°W

Corncockle Quarry was a large and historically important sandstone quarry near Templand in Dumfries and Galloway, Scotland. Stone from here was used in the late Victorian era to build tenements in Edinburgh and Glasgow, and also to construct New York 'brownstones'.

== Geology ==
The sandstone in Corncockle Quarry is the Corncockle Sandstone Formation and dates from the Cisuralian, the Lower Permian between 298.9 - 272.3 Mya. Fossil footprints were found there in the early 1800s, uncovered during quarrying. They are often wrongly referred to as dinosaur footprints, but dinosaurs did not exist at this time. They belong instead to other extinct reptiles such as therapsids - the group that would eventually lead to mammals, and includes animals like Dimetrodon.

The footprints from Corncockle were the first ever described scientifically, by Mr. J Grierson, and the Reverend Henry Duncan in 1828. Rev Duncan then published his paper on the footprints in 1831.

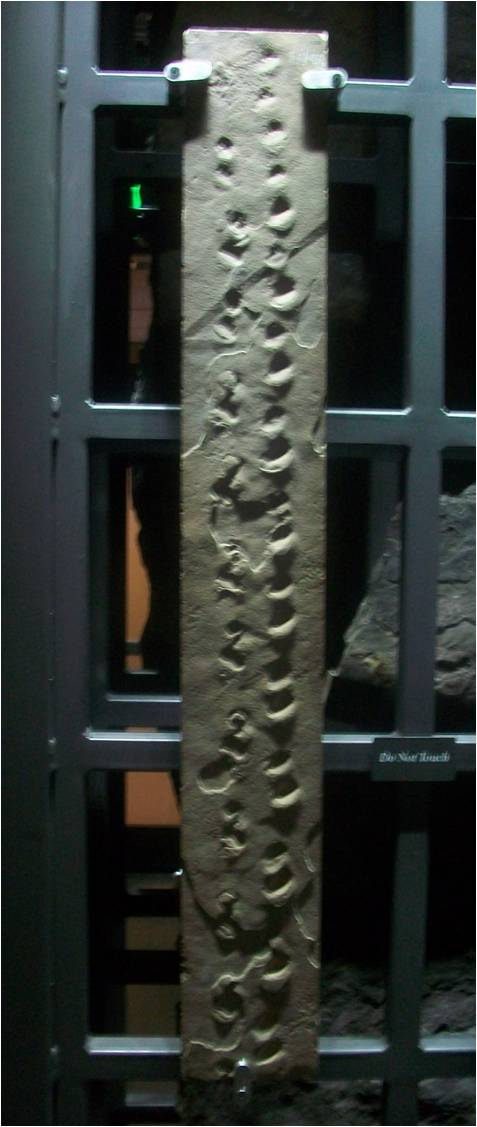
Fossil footprints of Chelichnus duncani

The name for the study of fossil footprints and other trace marks, ichnology, was coined by Sir William Jardine, whose book The Ichnology of Annadale was about the trackways found in Corncockle Quarry, part of his ancestral estate. The prints were then described by William Buckland following correspondence with Rev Duncan.

The fossils are displayed at Dumfries Museum and the National Museum of Scotland, Edinburgh.

== Commercial Use ==
The stone in Corncockle Quarry - now called Dunhouse Quarry - is currently extracted by Dunhouse. At its peak the quarry was connected to the Caledonian Main Line by a mineral railway. It was the subject of a lithograph by William Jardine.
