= Locharbriggs Sandstone Formation =

Geological formation in Scotland

- Stratigraphic range: Cisuralian
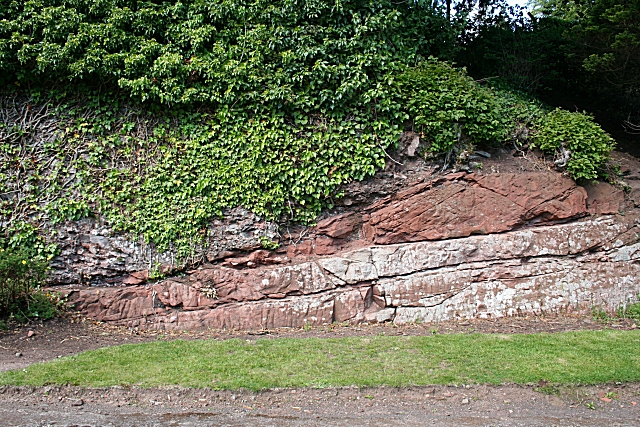
- Locharbriggs Sandstone Formation
- Type: Geological formation
- Unit of: Stewartry Group
- Underlies: Doweel Breccia Formation
- Overlies: unconformity on Lower Paleozoic
- Area: Dumfries Basin, North Solway Basin
- Thickness: 1000 m

Lithology
- Primary: Sandstone

Location
- Country: Scotland

Type section
- Named for: Locharbriggs

The Locharbriggs Sandstone Formation is a formation of Cisuralian age (Early Permian). It consists of a 1000 m thick sequence of very well-sorted aeolian sandstones, with well developed dune cross-bedding. The sandstone was used as a building stone in Dumfries, Edinburgh, Glasgow and New York (including the steps of the Statue of Liberty).
