= Heathhall =

Suburb of Dumfries in Scotland

- Village
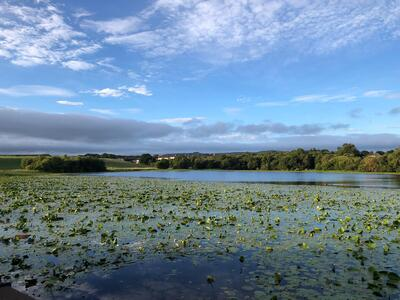

- Location within Dumfries and Galloway
- Area: 1.41 km^{2} (0.54 sq mi)
- Population: 3,225
  - Density: 2,287/km^{2} (5,920/sq mi)
- Council area: Dumfries and Galloway
- Country: Scotland
- Sovereign state: United Kingdom
- Postcode district: DG1
- Police: Scotland
- Fire: Scottish
- Ambulance: Scottish

Heathhall is a suburb of Dumfries, in the council area of Dumfries and Galloway, Scotland. It is to the north of Dumfries and just south of Locharbriggs. It was an airfield for the duration of the Second World War. It lies along the A701 road, which starts at a roundabout along the A75. It has one primary school, which also has a nursery. Heathhall's is notable for its B-Listed Gates factory and the Dumfries and Galloway Aviation Museum. Heathhall has a population of 3225 people.

== Business ==
Heathhall has very few businesses, but those that are there happen to be mostly local. Businesses around Heathhall include: Heathhall Garden Centre, Dalscone Farm Fun 2 Premier Convienence stores (one of which is in Locharbriggs, but is in close enough proximity to be used by residents of both areas) and The Little Bakery Dumfries.

== History ==
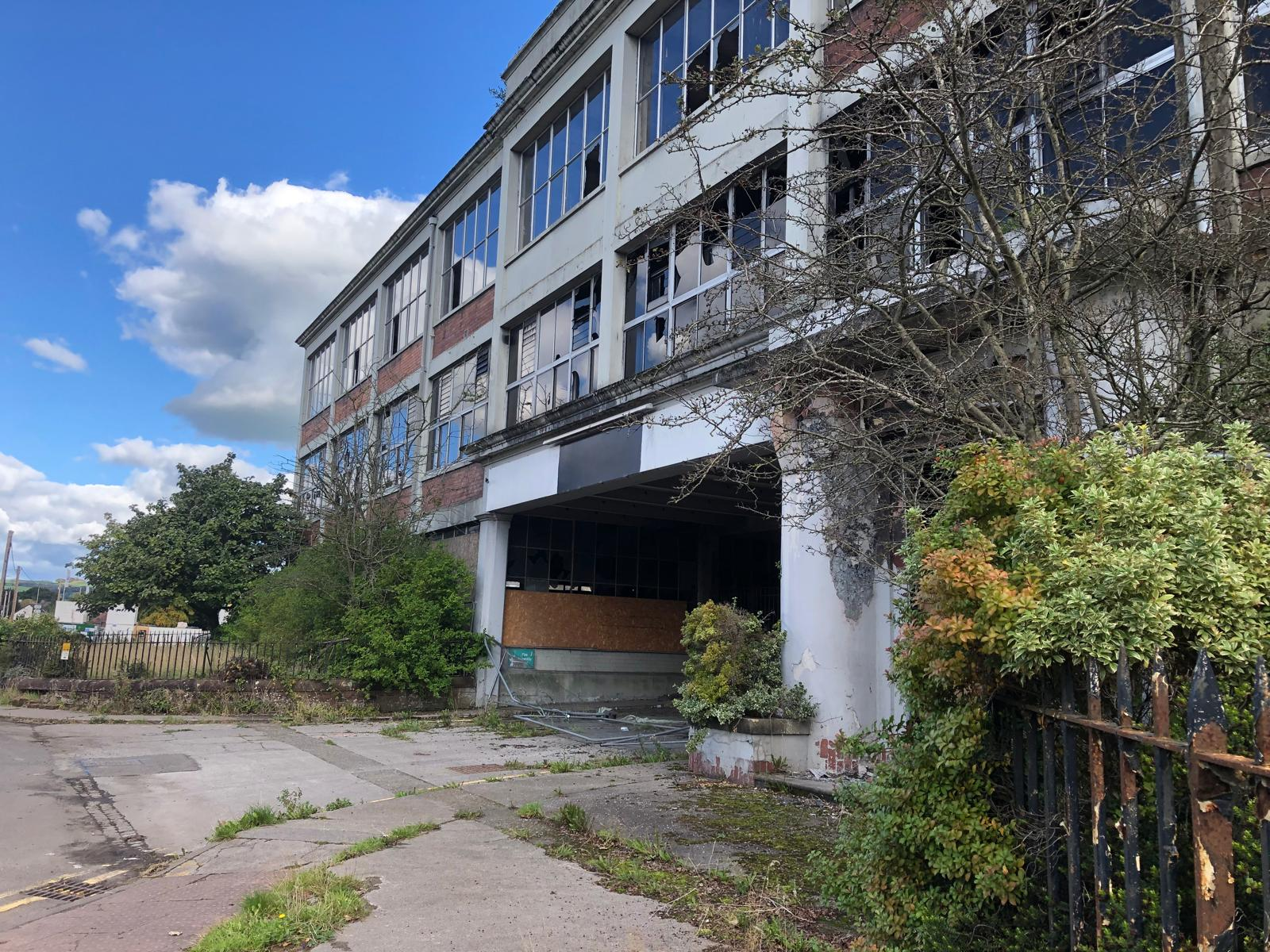
Image of the Factory.

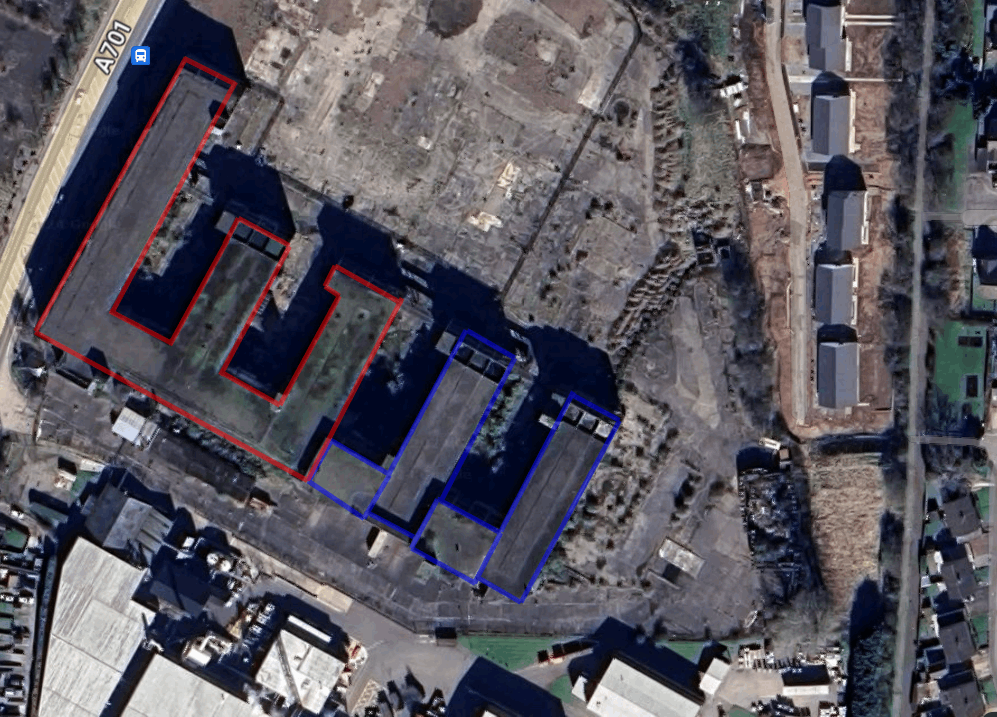
Layout of the factory. Red Outline is for the old building and the blue outline for the extensions added on at a later point.

Heathhall famously has an old car factory, which used to belong to Arrol-Johnstone Car Co. This factory was opened in July 1913, it is a fairly unique building as it was designed after pre-World War 1 American architecture. The site was chosen by Thomas Charles Willis Pullinger, who had been a manager of Arrol-Johnstone since 1908. Pullinger chose the site as it had room for expansion, it also had a rail link to markets in England and also housing could be built nearby which could attract families. The factory was designed with a flat roof on an 'E' plan, meaning that the building looked like a capital E from above, but later on at some point the building had two extra sections added on. The 'E' plan allowed the building to have separate workshops throughout each section. Each floor also had an electric lift. The lifts were built large enough to transport a completed motorcar. Car production at the factory had eventually ceased by the late 1920's and the factory eventually closed by 1931. The site was bought by North British Rubber Co. Ltd in 1946/1947 and is currently owned by a subsidiary of Gates Rubber Company.

== Geography ==
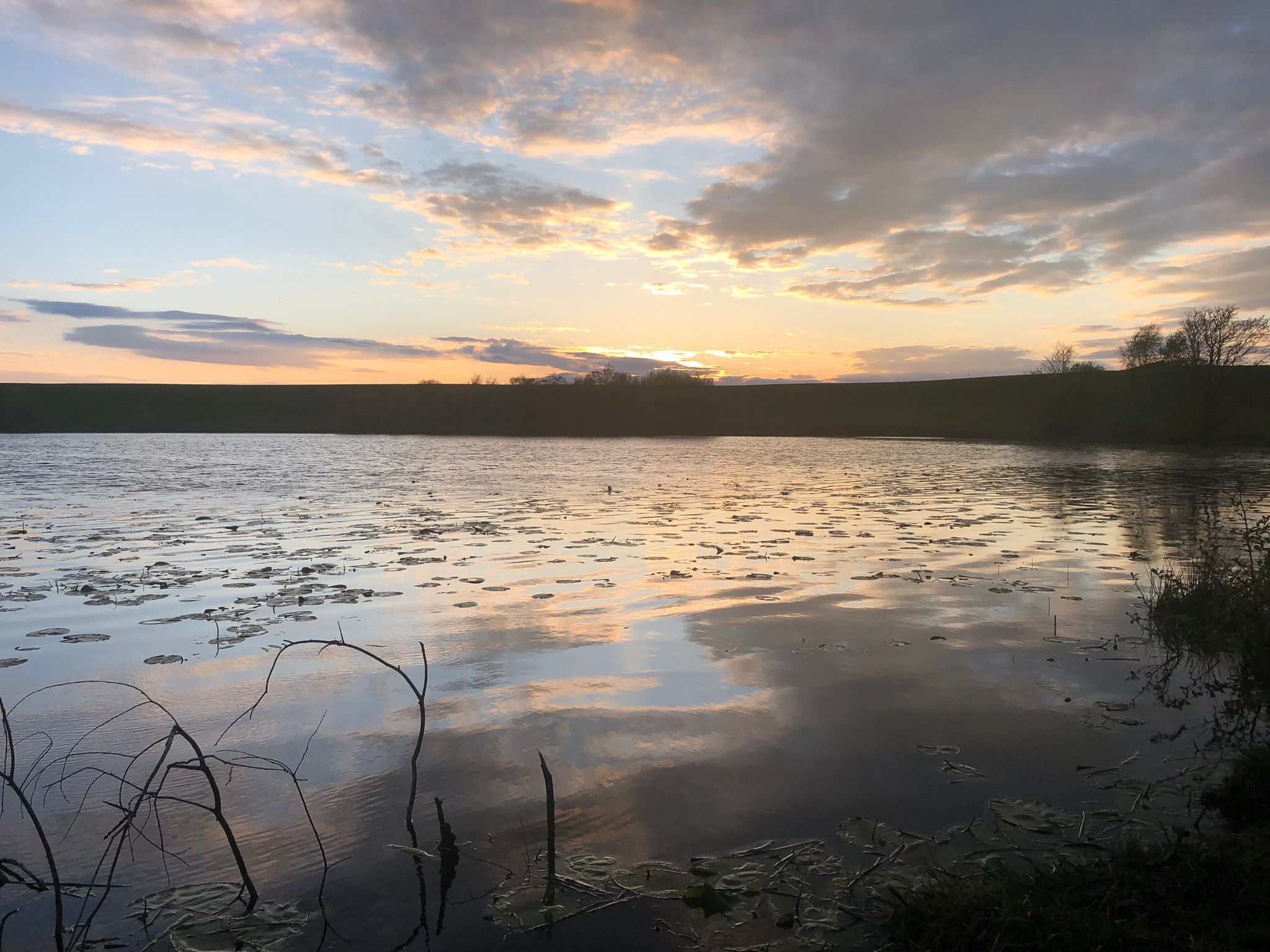
A Photo of Auchencrieff Loch from the other side of the Loch.

Heathhall is relatively small settlement, so it doesn't have much variation in terms of geodiversity. Heathhall has one Loch (Auchencrieff Loch) and a forest (Heathhall Forest).

== Layout of Heathhall ==
Heathhall has an area of 1.41 km², which is equivalent to 0.54 sq mi. Heathhall's longest street which is fully inside of Heathhall is Herries Avenue, which sprouts off of Martinton Road at the north of Heathhall then goes east for a short distance, then drops south before it ends at a roundabout and turns into 3 more streets, which are: Twiname way, which continues south from Herries avenue with a curve that ends up going east, Anson Avenue goes east right away and Astor Drive goes west, Astor Drive merges with Downs Way at a roundabout which moves up north and then turns into Martinton Road.

== Public Facilities ==
There is a library in Heathhall as well as a medical centre, they provide services for just about anyone in the area surrounding Heathhall and Locharbriggs.

== In Media ==
Heathhall doesn't get much mention in the media, but Heathhall was mentioned in an episode of the 'Hairy Bikers Go West' with the Little Bakery being the point of focus.

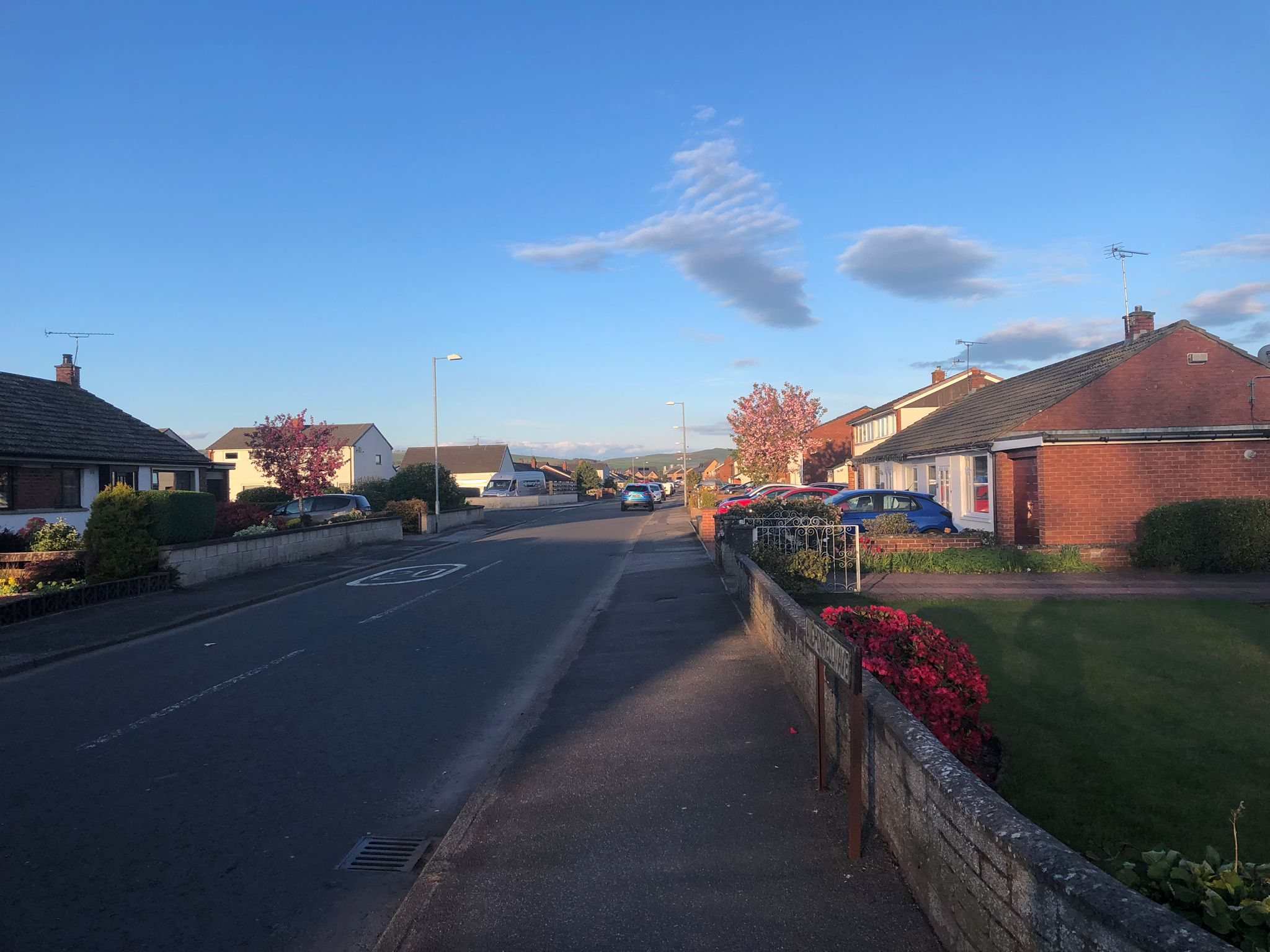
A picture of Auchenkeld Avenue, a prominent street in Heathhall.

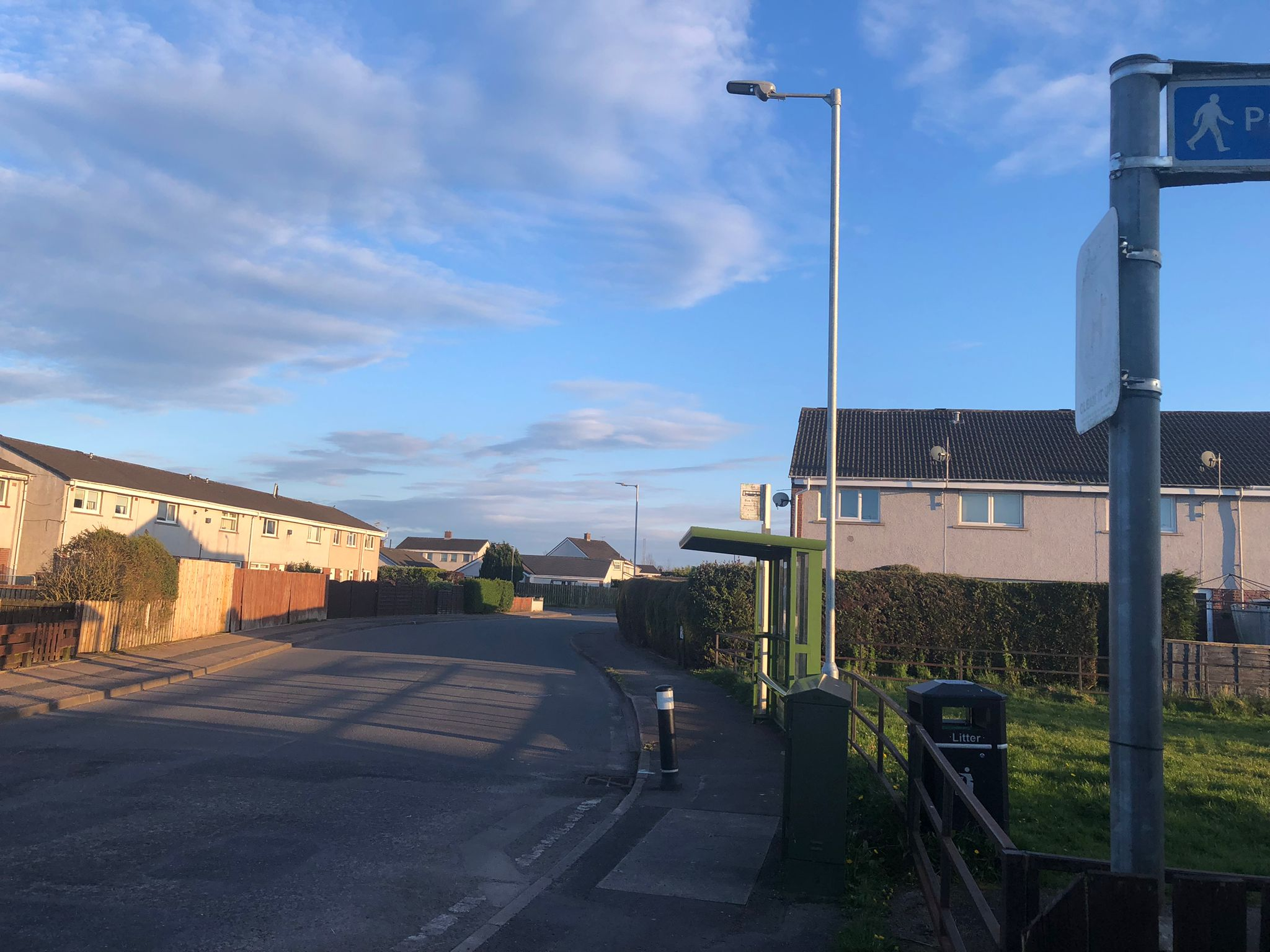
A picture of Downs Way, the street that later turns into Martinton Road.

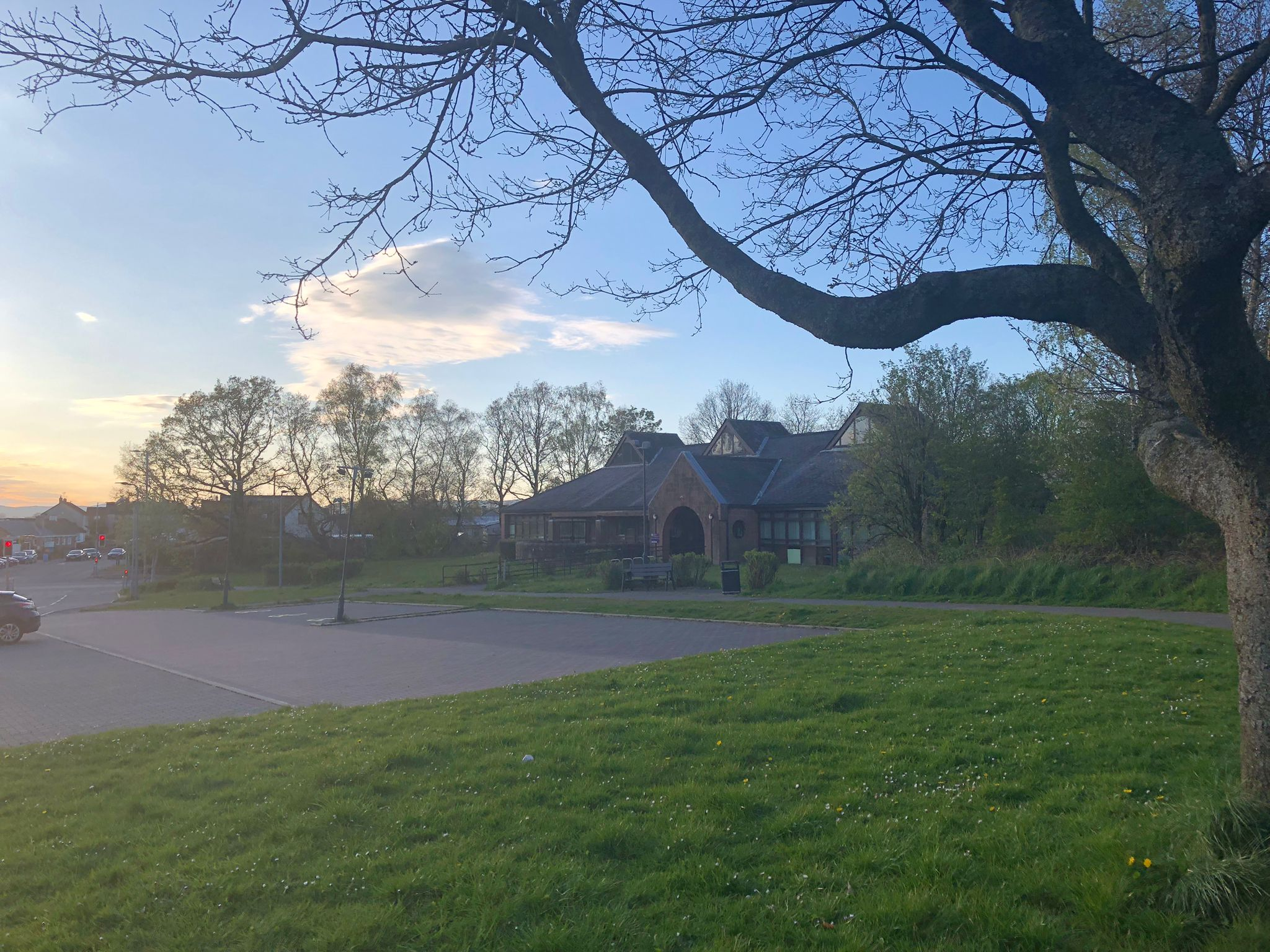
A photo of Lochthorn Library, the library of Heathhall.

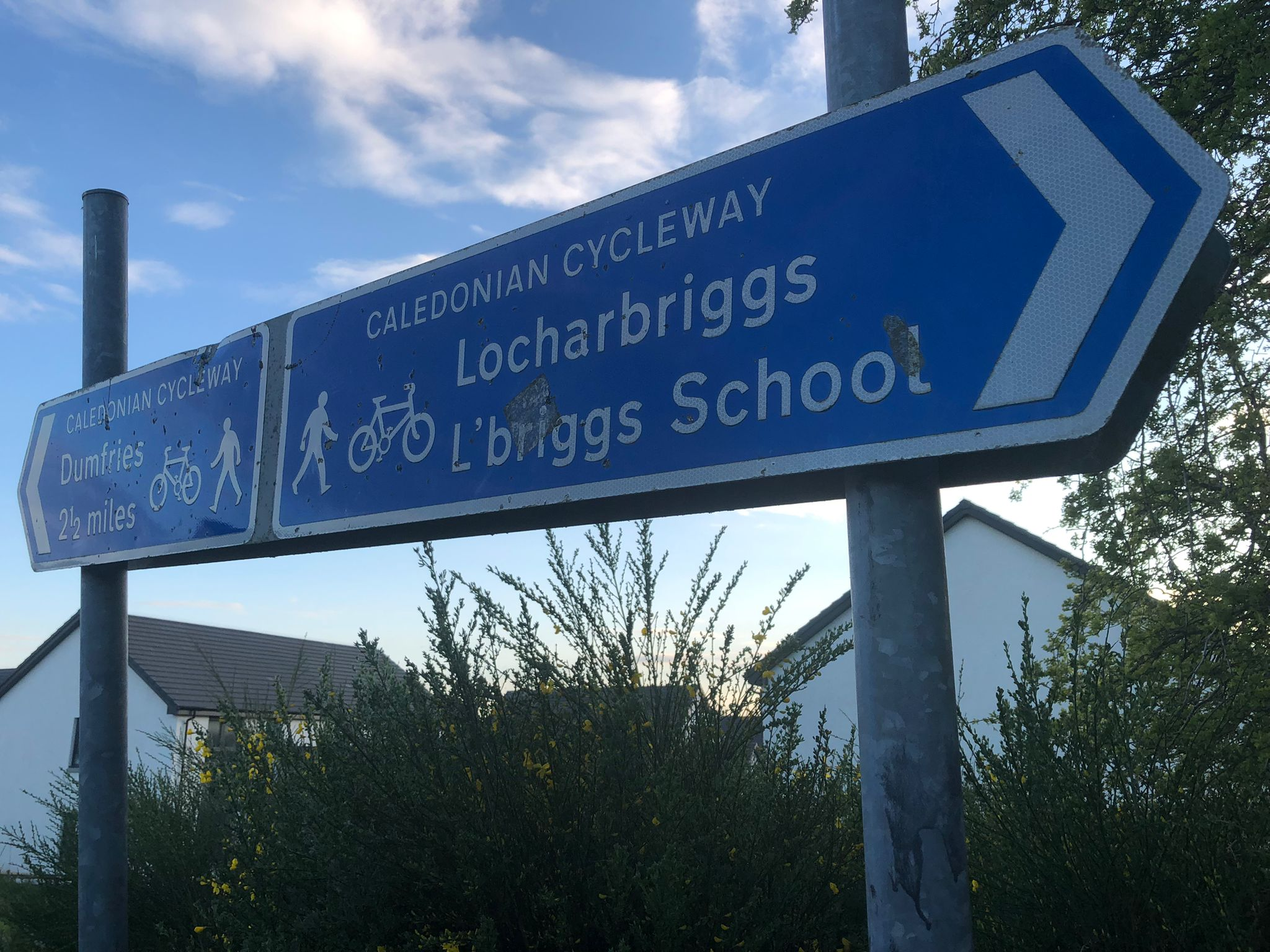
A sign that points towards Locharbriggs and Dumfries in Heathhall.

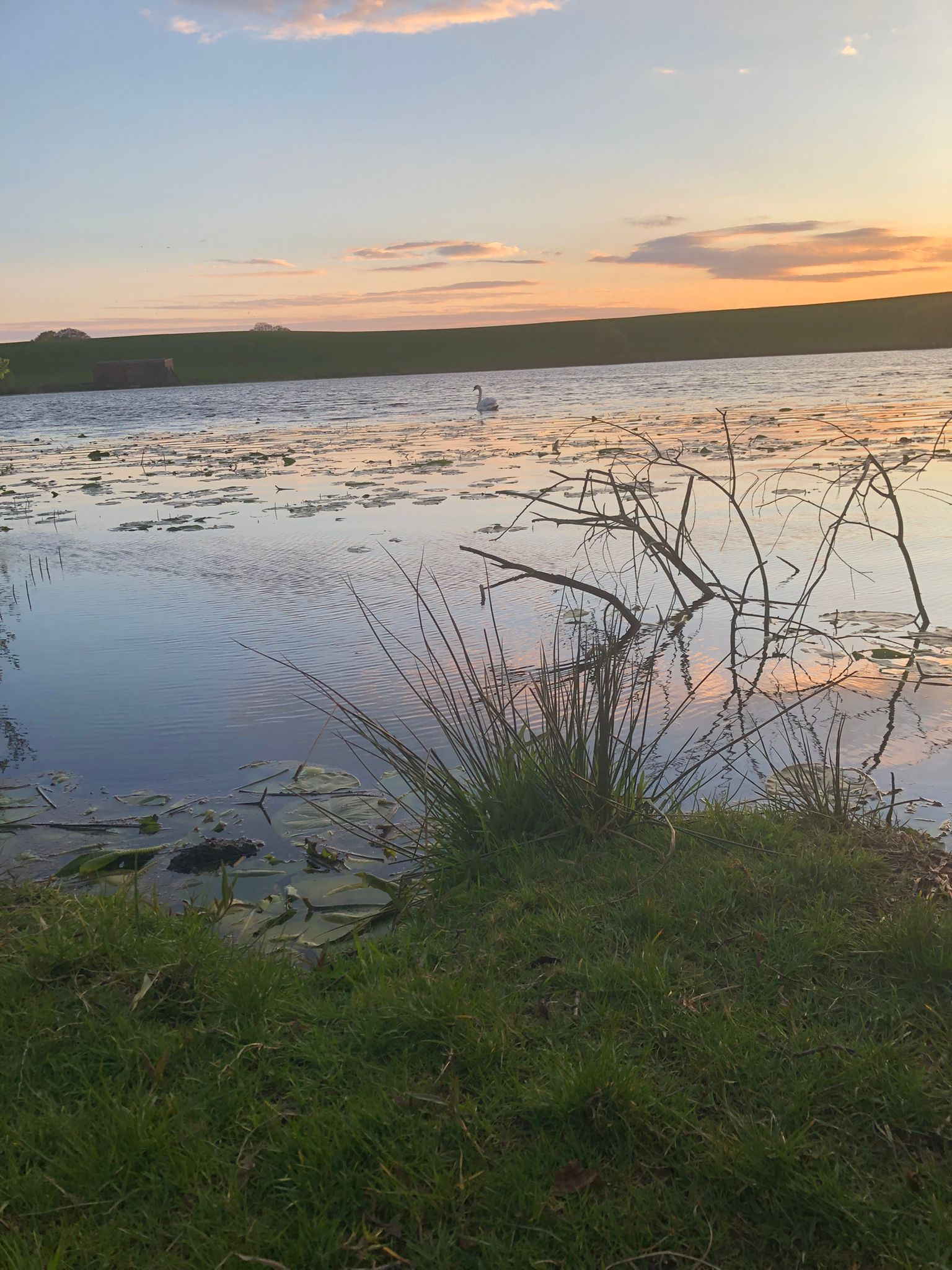
Swan on Auchencreiff Loch.

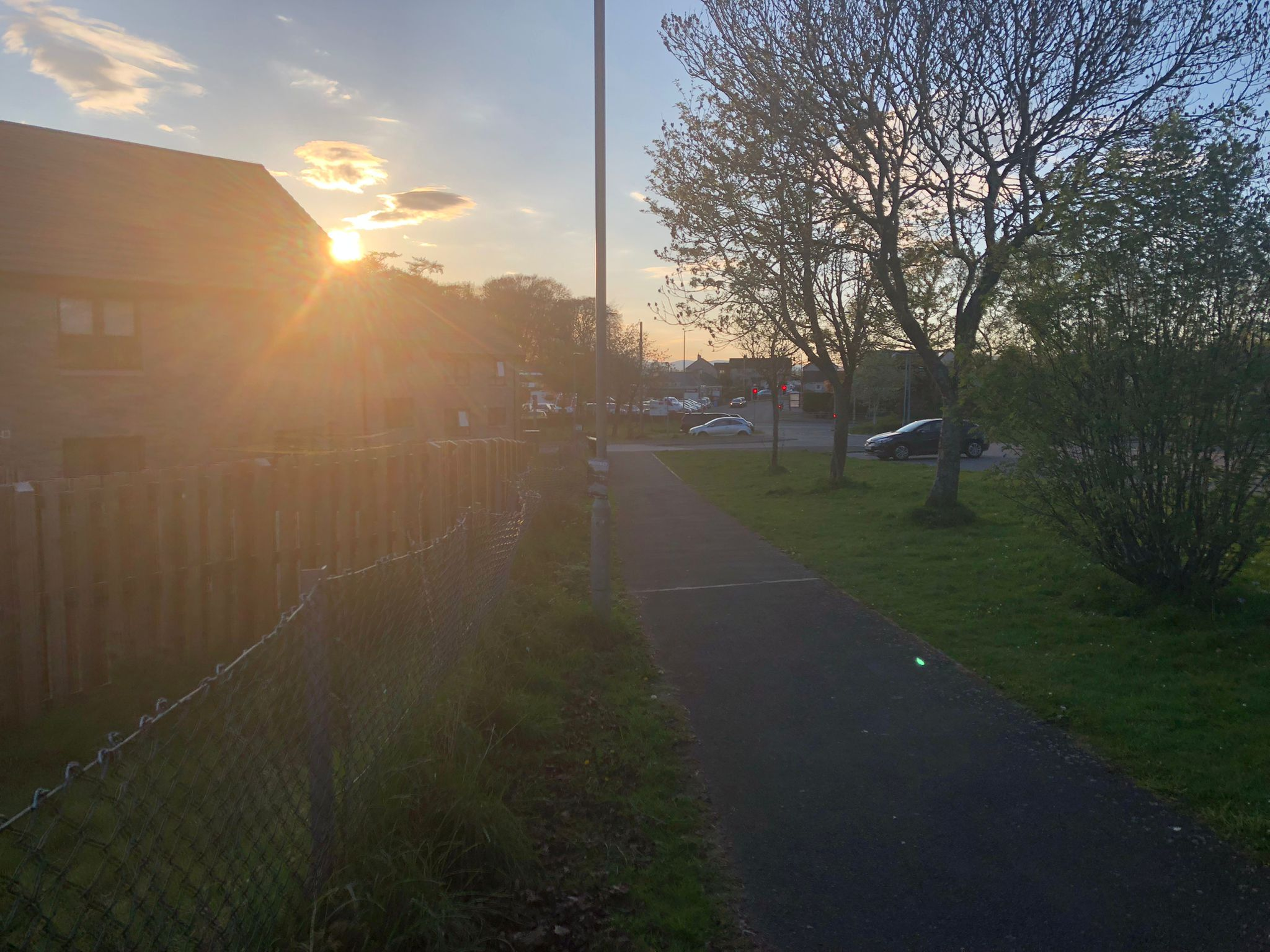
A picture from Heathhall looking down towards Locharbriggs.
