= Stewartry Group =

- Stratigraphic range: Cisuralian
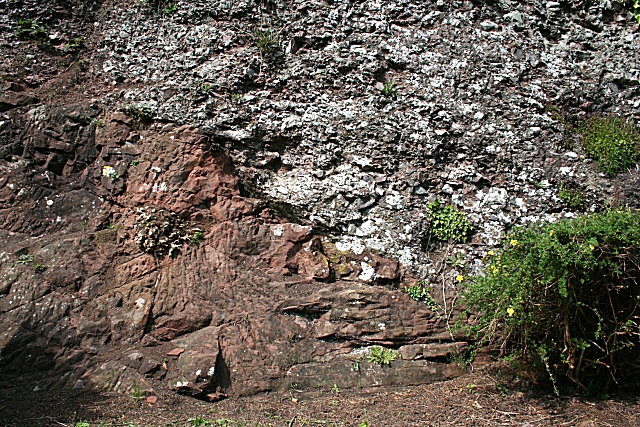
- Doweel Breccia over Locharbriggs Sandstone
- Type: Group
- Sub-units: Locharbriggs Sandstone Formation, Doweel Breccia Formation (Dumfries Basin), Corncockle Sandstone Formation (Lochmaben Basin), Thornhill Sandstone Formation, Durisdeer Breccia Formation, Carron Basalt Formation (Thornhill Basin), Loch Ryan Formation, (Stranraer Basin)
- Underlies: Top everywhere erosional
- Overlies: Unconformity over Lower Paleozoic, or Carboniferous
- Thickness: up to 610 m (2,000 ft), possibly up to 2,000 m (6,600 ft)

Lithology
- Primary: Sandstone, breccia
- Other: Conglomerate, siltstone, basalt

Location
- Region: Southern Uplands
- Country: Scotland

Type section
- Named for: Stewartry

The Stewartry Group is a geological group, a stratigraphic unit of mainly breccias and sandstones of Permian age that are found in Southern Scotland. The sequence sits unconformably either on rocks of lower Paleozoic age or Carboniferous strata. The upper boundary of this unit is everywhere erosional. Rocks of the Stewartry Group form the fill of a series of extensional basins trending NW-SE to N-S across the Southern Uplands.

== Stratigraphy ==
Each of the basins has its own stratigraphy, although the main basinal fill in most cases is a thick sequence of sandstone, that passes either laterally or vertically into breccia.

=== Thornhill Basin ===
At its base the Thornhill Basin has a sequence of olivine basalt lavas with some interbedded breccia and sandstone, known as the Carron Basalt Formation. The lavas are overlain by either the Durisdeer Breccia Formation or the Locherben Breccia Formation. Both of these breccia formations pass laterally and upwards into aeolian sandstones of the Thornhill Sandstone Formation.

=== Dumfries Basin ===
The Dumfries Basin contains breccias and breccio-conglomerates of the Doweel Breccia Formation, which pass laterally and vertically into aeolian sandstones of the Locharbriggs Sandstone Formation.

=== Lochmaben Basin ===
The northwestern part of the Lochmaben Basin also has lavas of the Carron Basalt Formation at the base of the sequence. These are overlain by interbedded silty sandstones and breccio-conglomerates of the Hartfield Formation. The Hartfield Formation passes up into the thick aeolian sandstones of the Corncockle Sandstone Formation. The uppermost part of the succession is the Lochmaben Formation formed of interbedded siltstones and fine-grained sandstones with layers of coarse-grained sandstone.

=== Other basins ===
The Stranraer Basin contains thick breccio-conglomerates with variable amounts of interbedded sandstones of the Loch Ryan Formation. In the Ballantrae Basin, the basal Park End Breccia Formation is succeeded by fluvial sandstones of the Coreseclays Sandstone Formation. Further small outliers of the Stewartry Group are found in the Moffat Basin, the Sanquhar Basin and Snar Valley.
