= Sister Lauras Food Supplement =

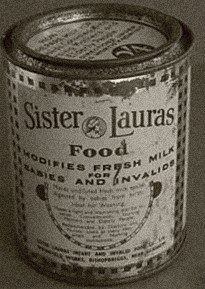
- Sister Lauras Food Supplement
- Product type: Casein-based powder formula
- Current owner: Sister Laura Marian Smith
- Country: Scotland
- Introduced: early 1900s
- Discontinued: 1981
- Markets: Scotland
- Registered as a trademark in: Sister Laura's Infant and Invalid Food Co. Ltd

Sister Lauras Food Supplement (sometimes written as Sister Laura's Food, though the product's label did not include an apostrophe) was a nutritional product, developed and manufactured in Scotland in the early- and mid-twentieth century.

== History ==
=== Origins ===
In the early 1900s Sister Laura Marian Smith, a pediatric dispensary nurse at the Glasgow Royal Maternity Hospital, noted the high levels of malnutrition in children at the time. She promoted the use of a casein inhibitor to make cow's milk more beneficial to those who had extreme difficulty in digesting it. A powder formula to mix with milk became an effective and low-cost aid to patient recovery. Although the product was named after Sister Laura, the commercial powder is said to have been developed by Leonard Findlay, at the time a noted expert of infant dietary disorders at Rottenrow. Sister Laura was one of the original shareholders when the company when it was established in 1911. However, by 1920 she had sold her interests in the company, to avoid the appearance of a profit motive in her work or the work of the dispensary.

=== Manufacture, expansion, and decline ===
The business continued to expand, opening a purpose-built factory at Emerson Road West, Bishopbriggs. The new factory at Springfield Works (Emerson Road West) coincided with the incorporation of a new company, Sister Lauras Infant and Invalid Food Co Ltd, which was controlled by William and Edward Watson. It expanded rapidly, acquiring other well-established products, notably Teddylax and Zomogen, the latter being used as a treatment of anaemia and neurasthenia. The company marketed to new mothers and public health nurses through maternity clinics.

The Sister Laura Co expanded Internationally, with the purchase of Irish company H J Wade & Co. In 1957, with declining sales of its core product after the arrival of the NHS in 1948, the company purchased a patent for 'improvements relating to quick cooking cereal or farinaceous products' from Hans Knoch. The process was used to produce Easyrice at Springfield Works. However, with consumer choice becoming more sophisticated, within ten years Sister Lauras found itself unable to recover its earlier profitability, and the factory closed in 1981.

The corporate records of the Sister Lauras Infant and Invalid Food Co Ltd are held at the East Dunbartonshire Archives in Kirkintilloch.
