= Cowlairs =

Coordinates: 55.879°N 4.241°W

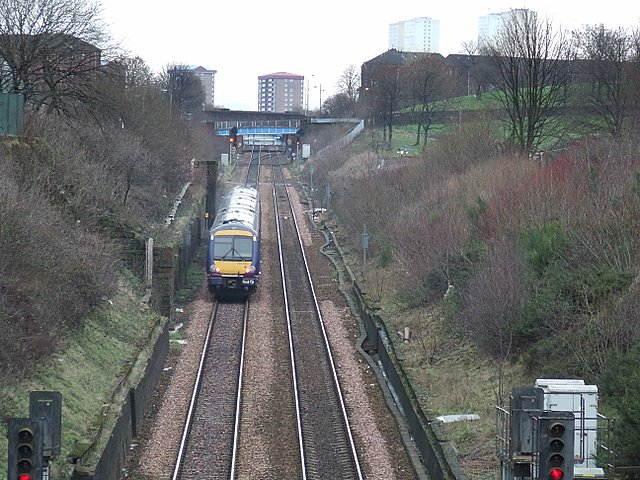
- View northwards from Pinkston Road of the Glasgow to Edinburgh via Falkirk Line railway bisecting Cowlairs (2009)

- Location within Glasgow
- OS grid reference: NS598678
- Council area: Glasgow City Council
- Lieutenancy area: Glasgow
- Country: Scotland
- Sovereign state: United Kingdom
- Post town: GLASGOW
- Postcode district: G21 1
- Dialling code: 0141
- Police: Scotland
- Fire: Scottish
- Ambulance: Scottish
- UK Parliament: Glasgow North East
- Scottish Parliament: Glasgow Maryhill and Springburn

Cowlairs (/kaʊˈlɛərz/) is an area in the Scottish city of Glasgow, part of the wider Springburn district of the city. It is situated north of the River Clyde, between central Springburn to the east and Possilpark to the west.

Administratively, in the 21st century Cowlairs is divided by the Glasgow to Edinburgh via Falkirk Line railway tracks (which played a crucial role in its history), with streets to the west of the lines falling under Glasgow City Council's Canal ward, and those to the east within the Springburn/Robroyston ward.

== History ==
Until the 19th century, the area was a country estate centred around Cowlairs House, situated just west of the Edinburgh and Glasgow Railway tracks. The Cowlairs railway works was founded in 1841 by the E&GR on the west side of the railway at Carlisle Street. It was the first works in Britain which built locomotives, carriages and wagons in one factory. In 1850, a train collision here resulted in five fatalities. In 1866, Cowlairs became the main workshop for the new owners, the North British Railway Company, as Springburn became a global centre of railway-related manufacturing.

A residential community developed around the railway works and other local industries, initially off Cowlairs Road from the Cowlairs railway station up to the western side of Springburn Road, then off the northern side of Keppochhill Road (the south side already being occupied by Sighthill Cemetery), spreading west to occupy the site of Cowlairs House which was demolished in the 1910s – it was located at what would become the junction of Endrick Street and Gourlay Street (named after the most prominent family which owned the mansion). To the west of this, an eponymous public park was laid out around a decade later. North of the park, a grid pattern of streets running east from Saracen Street, Possilpark was extended along to the perimeter of Cowlairs Works, lined with grey 'rehousing' tenements constructed cheaply to accommodate residents previously living in slum conditions elsewhere in the city.

In 1923, Cowlairs Works passed into the ownership of the London & North Eastern Railway (LNER), no more engines were built, and the works reverted to repair and maintenance. After nationalisation in 1948, the works became the property of British Rail Engineering Limited (BREL), who used steam locomotives until 1968.

From the 1960s, the area changed greatly. The railway station closed in 1964, followed by Cowlairs Works in 1968 (contracts were transferred to St. Rollox railway works, which was renamed as BREL's Glasgow works). North Glasgow was badly hit by the decline of traditional heavy industry, with the locomotive factories of Springburn joined by the Saracen Foundry at Possilpark in closing its doors. At the same time, the oldest part of the Cowlairs neighbourhood was levelled as part of the 'Comprehensive Redevelopment' of Springburn which later included a realigned dual carriageway to replace the old Springburn Road as belated attempts were made to adapt Glasgow to modern times.

The economic hardship that followed led to a deterioration in the condition of the housing in the area and an increase in health problems, social issues and crime. By the 1980s, parts of Springburn and particularly Possilpark had a very poor reputation. A housing association was established for the Hawthorn neighbourhood of east Possilpark which led to its refurbishment, but the tenements uphill from Hawthorn closer to Cowlairs were subject to wholesale demolition in the 1990s, without being replaced. The former site of Cowlairs Works was partly occupied by a Scotch Whisky bonded warehouse, while its southern half remained brownfield. The decline in the local population caused Cowlairs Park to be underused, vandalised and left to become increasingly dilapidated and overgrown, adding to the acres of wasteland in that part of Glasgow, less than two miles (three kilometres) from the city centre. At the physically isolated Cowlairs House area, some further tenement demolitions were followed by the building of new houses, as well as a small ballgames area for children and a regional headquarters for the Quarriers homeless charity. Nearby to the south, the looming presence of the Sighthill tower blocks diminished as the ten structures were demolished in stages over a decade between 2008 and 2018, at which point a facility for addiction rehabilitation at the southern edge of the park closed, with services relocating to Anniesland.

In July 2019, Glasgow City Council announced their intention to build around 800 homes on the vacant land to the west of the old works, including the park, within the next five years under a 'Cowlairs Masterplan'. The proposal did not include the smaller, but still substantial, works site itself as the council did not own that land; however, ten months later an outline plan was submitted by a private developer to construct 300 additional houses there.

There remains an association with railways in the area in the form of a diesel maintenance depot at Eastfield, half a mile to the north of the old works. In October 2013 the signalling centre at Cowlairs, which controls trains from Glasgow Queen Street High Level closed and transferred to Edinburgh Waverley. The West of Scotland Signalling Centre, located close to where Cowlairs station once stood and controlling much of the south of Glasgow, opened at Cowlairs South in December 2008. It controls the area formerly controlled by Glasgow Central Signalling Centre, and is expected eventually to control most of the west of Scotland.

== Sport ==
Cowlairs F.C. played in the area between 1876 and 1896. The club were founder members of the Scottish Football League in 1890 and played at Gourlay Park and Springvale Park.
