= Auchinairn =

Village in East Dunbartonshire, Scotland

Coordinates: 55.898575°N 4.213957°W

Auchinairn: Scottish Gaelic: Achadh nan Àirne
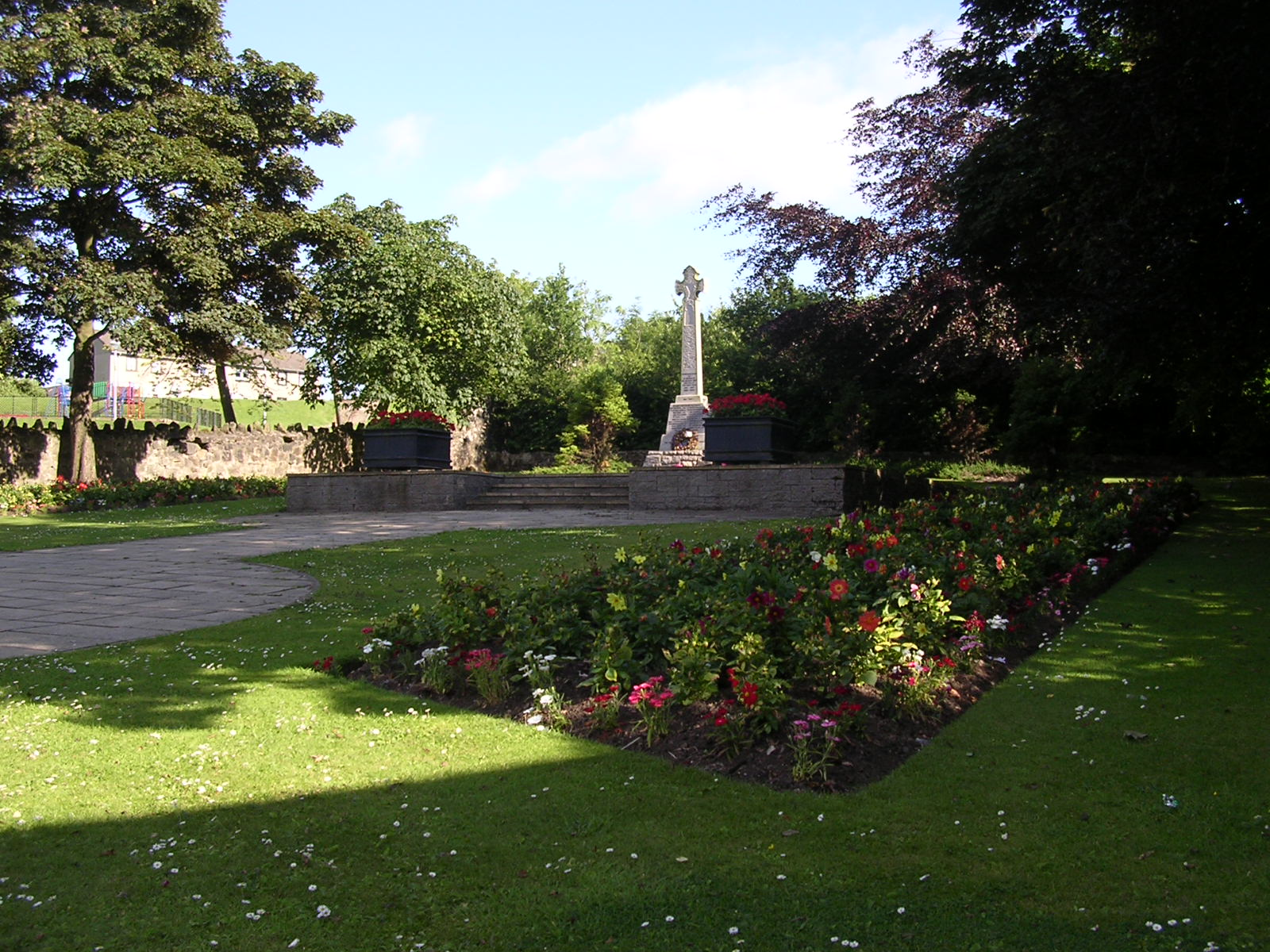
- Auchinairn War Memorial

- Location within Scotland Auchinairn (Scotland)
- OS grid reference: NS616695
- Country: Scotland
- Sovereign state: United Kingdom
- Post town: GLASGOW
- Dialling code: 0141
- Police: Scotland
- Fire: Scottish
- Ambulance: Scottish
- UK Parliament: East Dunbartonshire
- Scottish Parliament: Strathkelvin and Bearsden

Auchinairn (Scottish Gaelic: Achadh an Fheàrna or Achadh nan Àirne) is a suburb (formerly a village) within East Dunbartonshire, Scotland, and shares its southern boundary with the Robroyston and Balornock districts within the Glasgow City council area.

== History ==
Etymology

The original village of Auchinairn is derived from Scottish Gaelic, but there are differing interpretations of the name:

- Achadh an Fheàrna (silent "fh") - field of the alder. This is the official name.
- Achadh nan Àirne - field of the sloes. This derivation is more likely as a single N in the middle of the English name tends to derive from Gaelic nan/nam much more often than an; if Achadh an Fheàrna was the original name, you would expect it to have evolved into *Auchairn in modern English.

The village

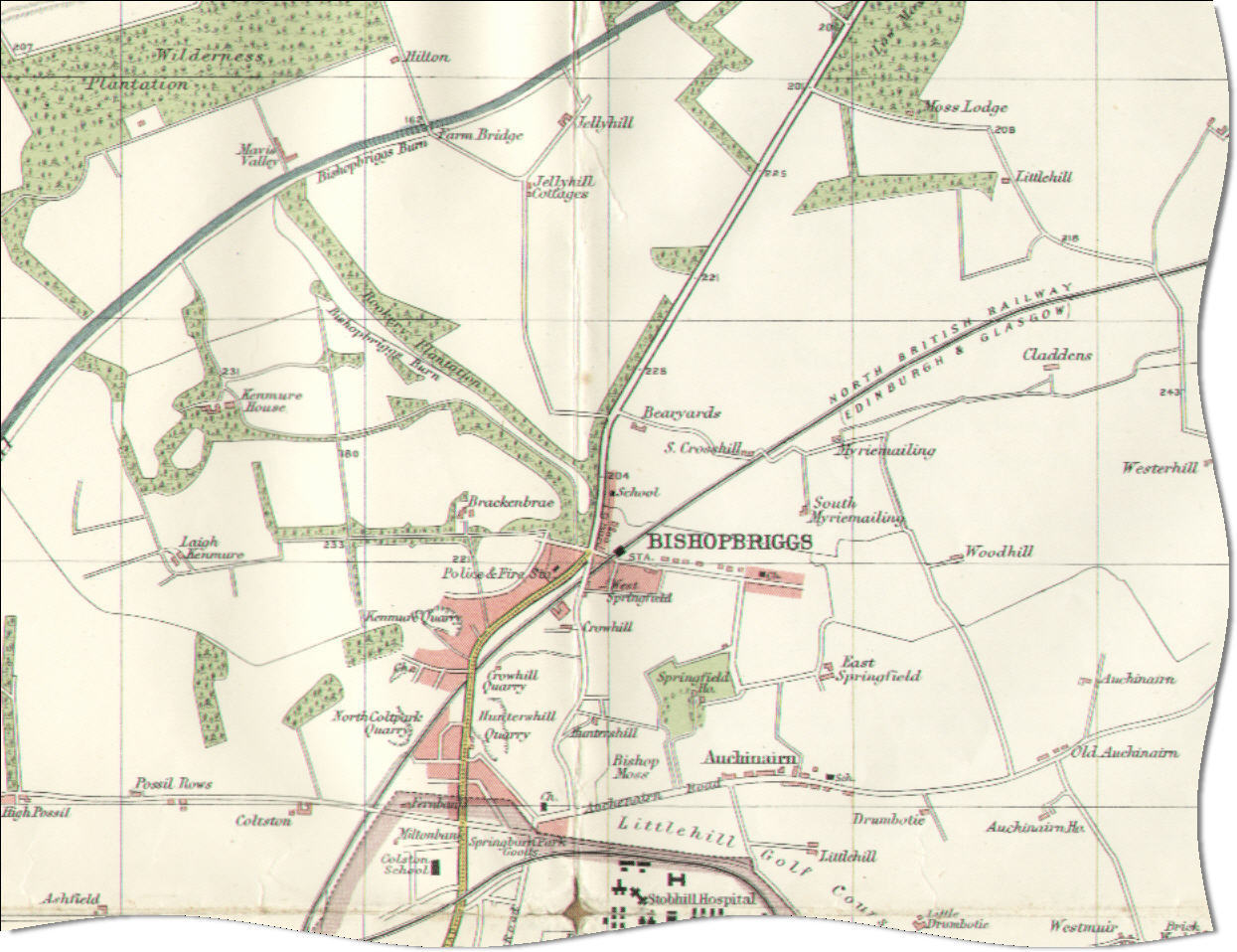
Map of Auchinairn and Bishopbriggs in the early 1900s

Auchinairn village originally developed as two distinct areas: Old Auchinairn (The Auld Toon) and New Auchinairn. Old Auchinairn lay to the north side of Auchinairn Road, between what is now Woodhill Road and Letham Drive. It had a school which was built about 1760.

New Auchinairn lay approximately between what is now Montrose Terrace and Springfield Avenue. It had a primary school which opened in 1876 and is now the Auchinairn Community Centre. The current primary school building stands on what was Auchinairn United football field.

The village was founded by weavers and has housed workers from many different industries around the area, such as the mines, the railway and the quarry.

In 1836 Auchinairn Village's population stood at 284 compared with neighbouring Bishopbriggs population which stood at 175, but the opening of the Edinburgh and Glasgow Railway in 1842 brought new industries to the area and as a result of this, housing was required for the workers. For many years Auchinairn was a vibrant community with a co-operative, a post office, several small shops, a public house, a community hall and a mission hall. The Free Church mission which met in that hall was granted full church status in 1865. The members built a church on Springfield Road, Bishopbriggs. It is now part of Springfield Cambridge Church.

Auchinairn had a brass band and a football team. Quoits was another popular activity. Littlehill Golf Course was designed by James Braid and opened in 1923. Harry Varden played there in 1925. Club professional, Tom Wilson, was once overnight leader in the British Open.

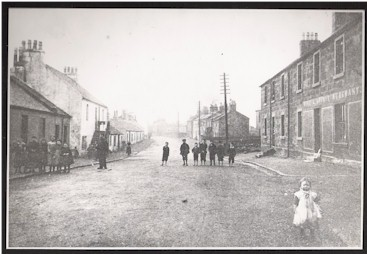
Auchinairn Road, 1900s

Auchinairn Village

The Co-operative on Auchinairn Road

Auchinairn Instrumental Band at the unveiling of the Wallace Memorial, Robroyston, 4 August 1900.

Although viewed today as part of the town of Bishopbriggs, Auchinairn still has a strong sense of community and its own identity. There were five villages: Auchinairn; Bishopbriggs; Cadder; Jellyhill; and Mavis Valley. All were separated from one another by farmland. In 1938 residents were moved from Auchinairn to council housing in Bishopbriggs. Post Second World War housing development resulted the farmland being built on. In 1964 the district was granted burgh status, and the name 'Bishopbriggs' was adopted.

== Present day ==
Auchinairn has several shops, public houses and restaurants, a primary school and a bowling club. A wide range of activities is offered in the community centre and in the community hall.

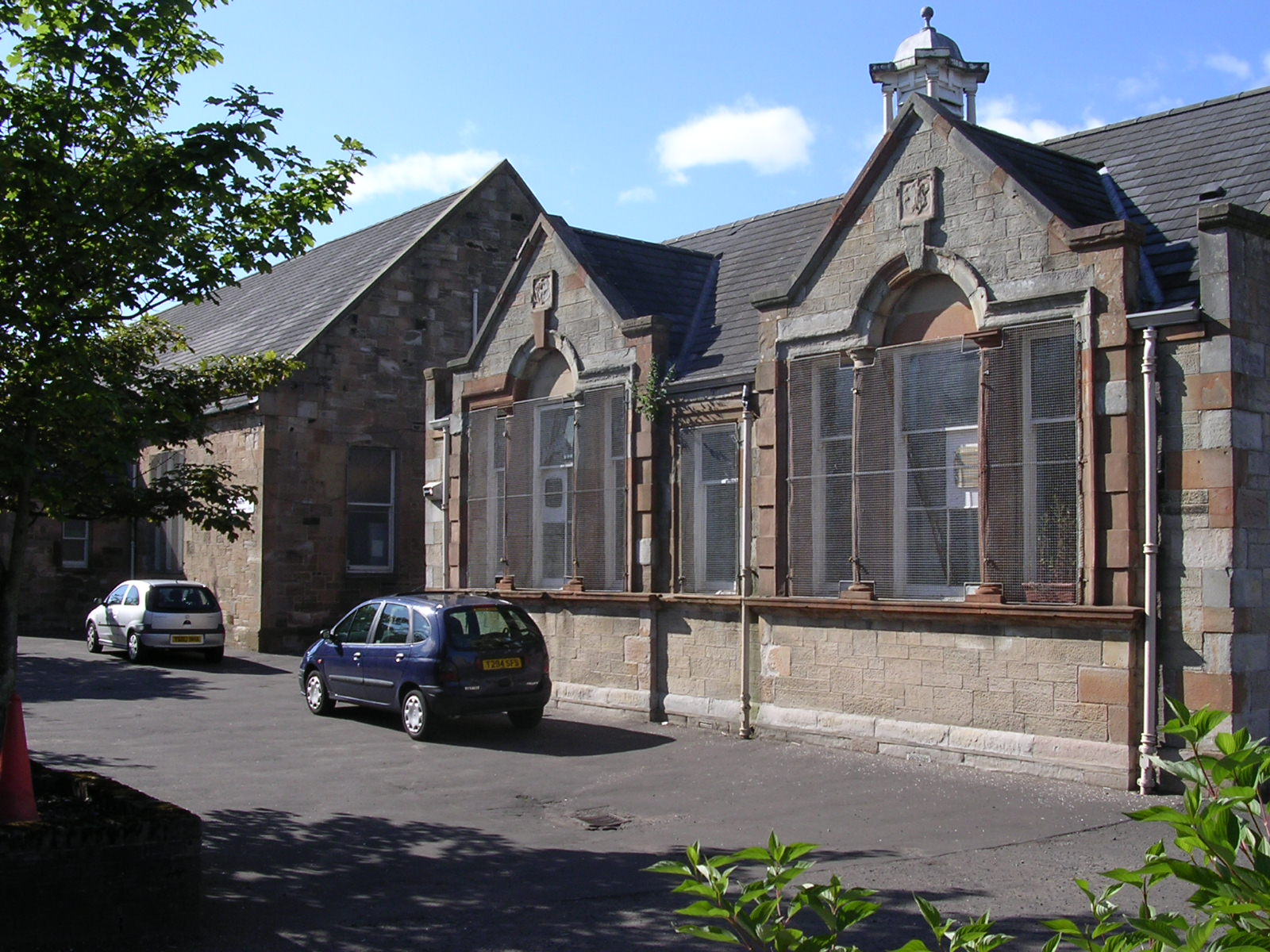
Old Auchinairn Primary School, now a community centre

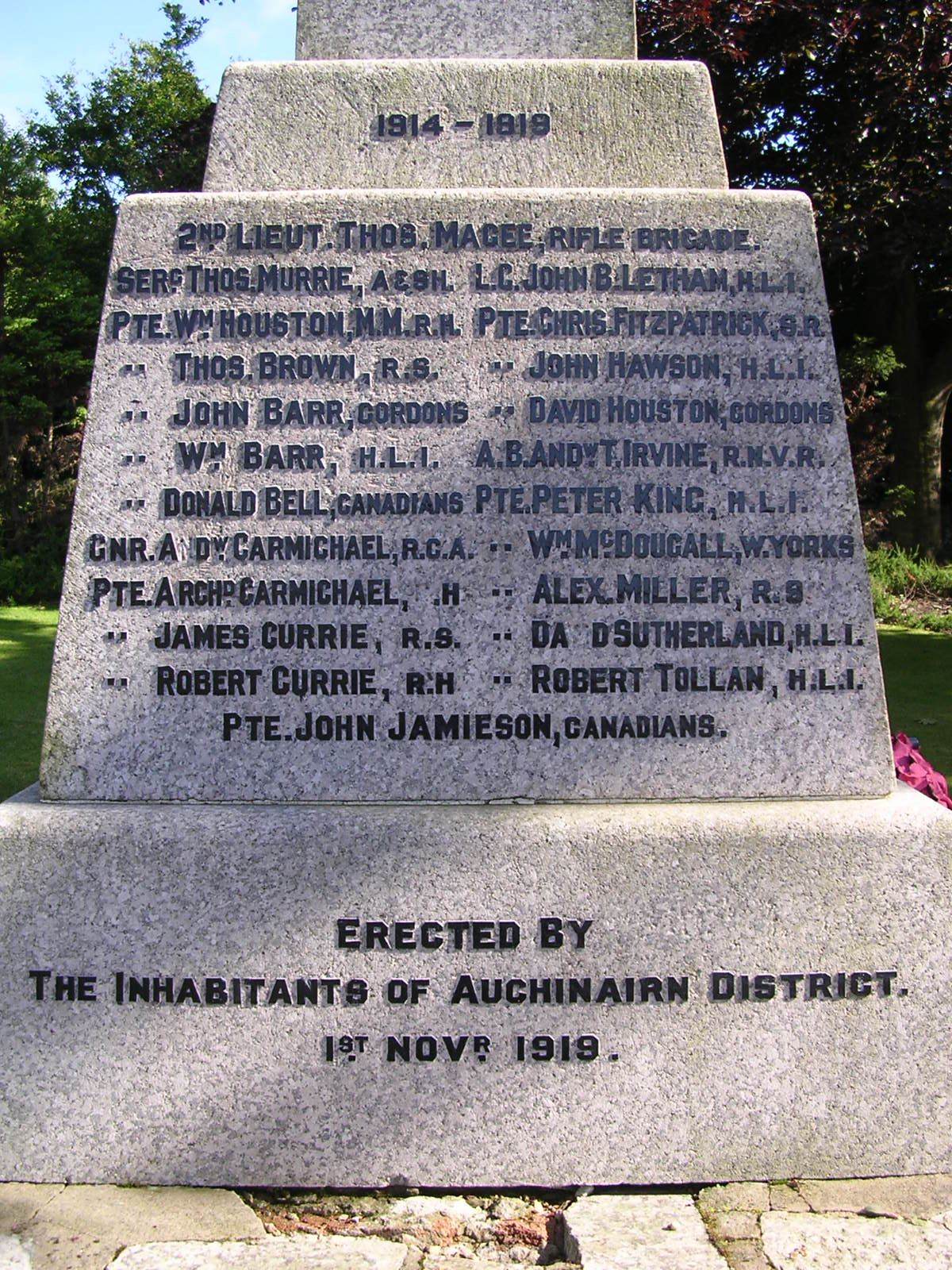
Auchinairn War Memorial

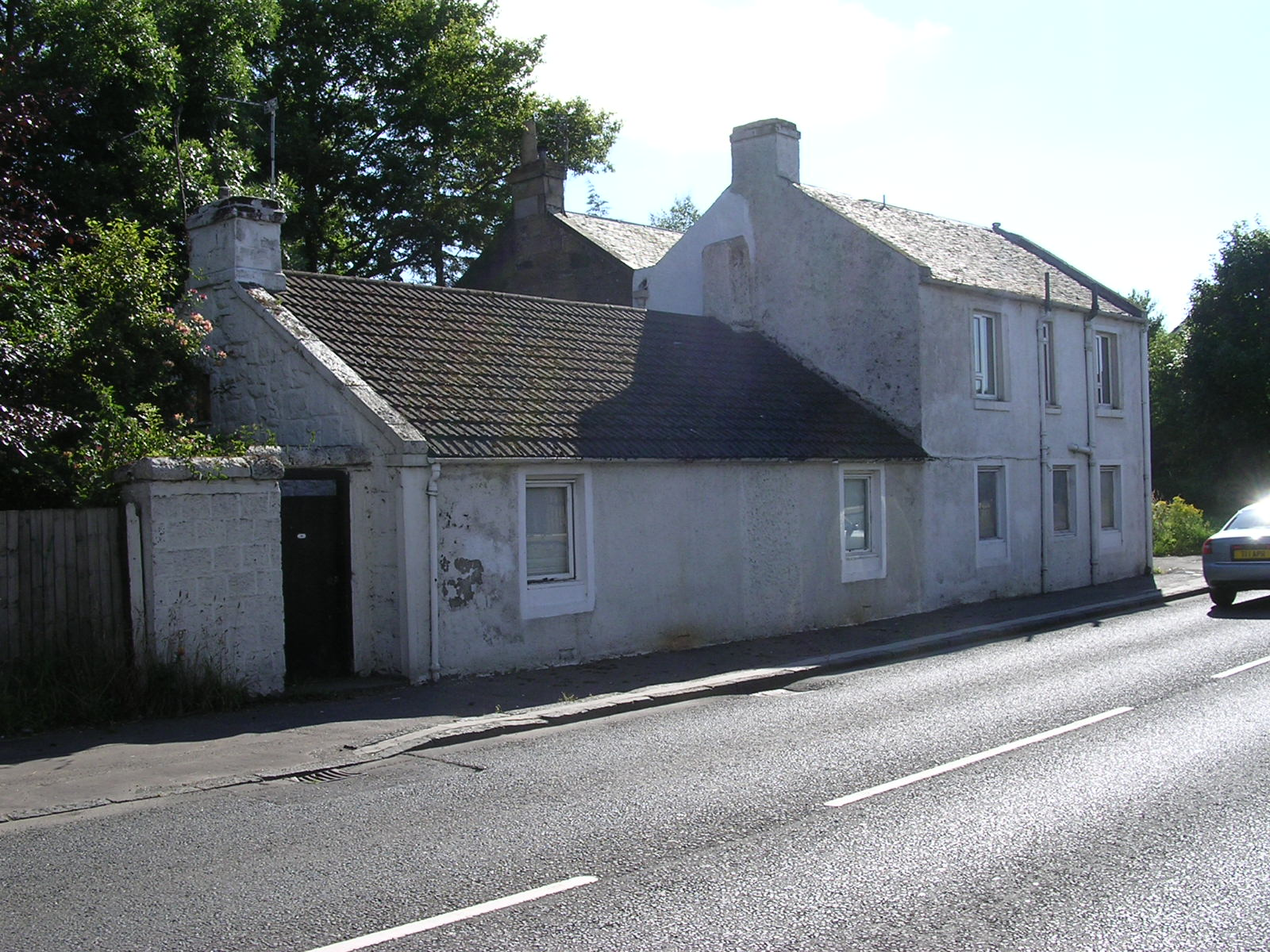
Auchinairn

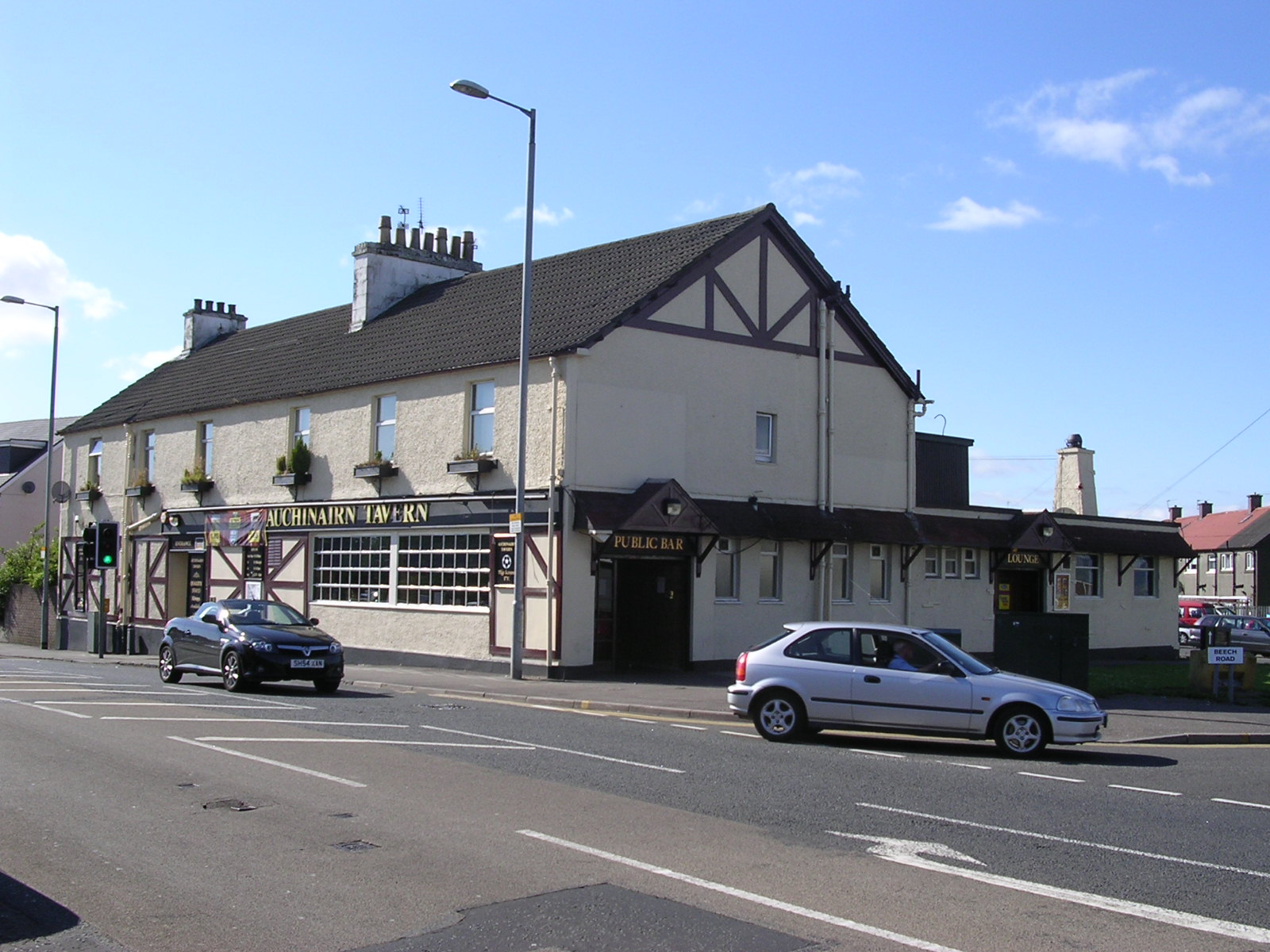
Auchinairn Tavern (Now The Village Inn)

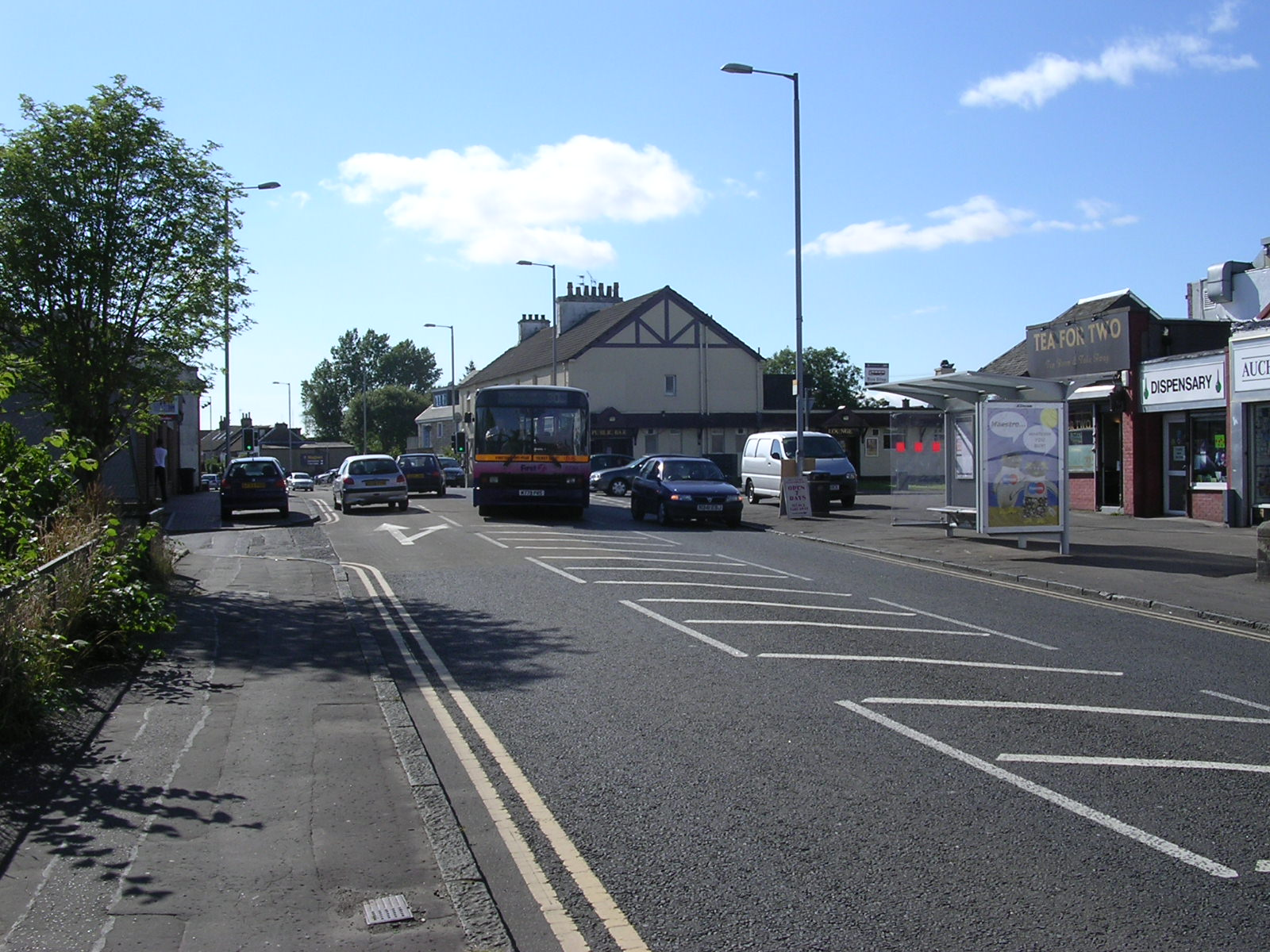
Main Street Auchinairn

== Noted residents ==
Famous residents include:

- Average White Band member Onnie McIntyre (born Owen McIntyre, 25 September 1945, Lennoxtown, Scotland - Family moved to Crowhill Road, Auchinairn/Bishopbriggs where he attended Auchinairn Primary) — vocals / rhythm guitar.
- Mimic and voice over artist Lewis MacLeod attended Auchinairn Primary School in the 1970s.
- John Lindsay who played football for Glasgow Rangers and Everton in the 1940s and 1950s.
