= Cowlairs railway station =

Disused railway station in Cowlairs, Glasgow

Cowlairs

General information
- Location: Cowlairs, Glasgow; Scotland
- Coordinates: 55.8823°N 4.2386°W
- Grid reference: NS600677
- Platforms: 2

Other information
- Status: Disused

History
- Original company: Edinburgh and Glasgow Railway
- Pre-grouping: North British Railway
- Post-grouping: London and North Eastern Railway

Key dates
- 1 April 1858: First opened
- July 1859: Opened to the public
- 7 September 1964: Closed
Location

Cowlairs railway station served the Cowlairs area of Glasgow, Scotland, from 1858 to 1964 on the Edinburgh and Glasgow Railway.

== History ==
The station was first opened on 1 April 1858 by the Edinburgh and Glasgow Railway, although it first appeared in Bradshaw in July 1859. To the northwest was the signal box and to the west was Cowlairs Works. The platform was widened in 1908. The signal box was replaced by Cowlairs Panel Box in 1956. The station closed on 7 September 1964. The signal box has not survived but the place where the island platform was can still be recognised today.

Preceding station	Historical railways	Following station
Bishopbriggs; Line and station open	North British Railway; Edinburgh and Glasgow Railway	Glasgow Queen Street; Line and station open
