= Bishopbriggs =

Coordinates: 55.9046°N 4.2250°W

Bishopbriggs: Scottish Gaelic: Coille Dobhair Drochaid an Easbaig; Scots: The Briggs
- Town
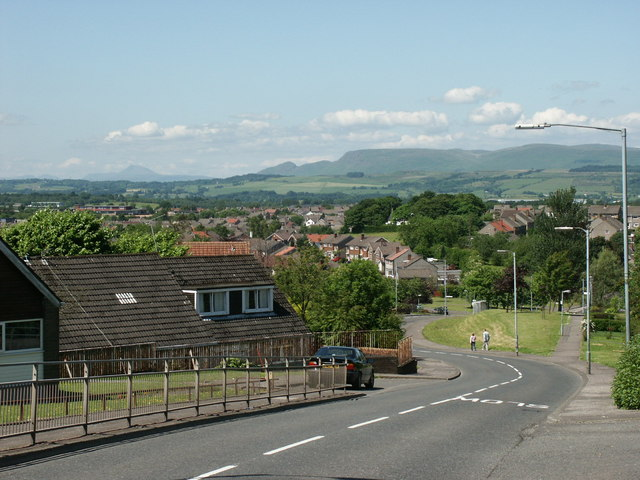
- Bishopbriggs vista, Woodhill Road

- Location within East Dunbartonshire Bishopbriggs (East Dunbartonshire)
- Population: 23,680 (2020)
- OS grid reference: NS615705
- Council area: East Dunbartonshire
- Lieutenancy area: Lanarkshire
- Country: Scotland
- Sovereign state: United Kingdom
- Post town: GLASGOW
- Postcode district: G64
- Dialling code: 0141
- Police: Scotland
- Fire: Scottish
- Ambulance: Scottish
- UK Parliament: Mid Dunbartonshire
- Scottish Parliament: Strathkelvin and Bearsden

Bishopbriggs (Scots: The Briggs; Scottish Gaelic: Achadh an Easbaig) is a town in East Dunbartonshire, Scotland. It lies on the northern fringe of Greater Glasgow, approximately 4 miles (6 km) from the city centre. Historically in Lanarkshire, the area was once part of the historic parish of Cadder - originally lands granted by King William the Lion to the Bishop of Glasgow, Jocelin, in 1180. It was later part of the county of Lanarkshire, and then an independent burgh from 1964 to 1975. Today, Bishopbriggs' close geographic proximity to Glasgow now effectively makes it a suburb and commuter town of the city.

Bishopbriggs grew from a small rural village on the old road from Glasgow to Kirkintilloch and Stirling during the 19th century, eventually growing to incorporate the adjacent villages of Auchinairn, Cadder, Jellyhill and Mavis Valley. It has a population of approximately 23,500 people. In architectural terms, Bishopbriggs is notable for its Victorian villas, constructed after local landowners Feued lands to the west of Kirkintilloch Road and Springfield Road from the 1850s, adjacent to the then recently completed Bishopbriggs station on the Glasgow to Edinburgh Railway, its inter-war art deco 'Garden Suburb' on the former Kenmure Estate, and also for its large-scale post-war private housing developments, which has more recently also including housing developments in the neighbouring formerly rural area of Robroyston.

It was ranked the 2nd most desirable postcode in Scotland to live in following a study by the Centre for Economic and Business Research in 2015 and 2016.

== History ==
Bishopbriggs' history stretches at least to Roman times, as Cadder was a Roman fort on the Antonine Wall, the furthest and most northerly boundary of the Roman Empire. As early as 1568, reference is made to a path northwards from Glasgow as the 'common passage to Bischopis Briggis'. Bishopbriggs was first documented in the Cadder Parish records of 1655, and was recorded to have had only eleven residents in the mid-18th century. Even more than a century later, after substantial growth, the village was still being referred to in the terms of the larger settlement of Cadder.

By 1793, the introduction of new farming techniques had improved yields. While crops such as oats, barley, potatoes and flax flourished, Cadder's population fared less well; a decrease of around 600 from the mid-1760s was attributed to new agricultural methods which combined smaller farms or Run rigs and swept away independent tenants, known as the Lowland Clearances. By 1836 there were 'almost no cotters' with the largest farms employing no more than ten people, and some of those only as maid servants. Land reclamation (through drainage) changed the landscape so that crops could grow, where once there was only marshland. Dairy farming was relied upon to cover ground rents.

=== 19th century development ===
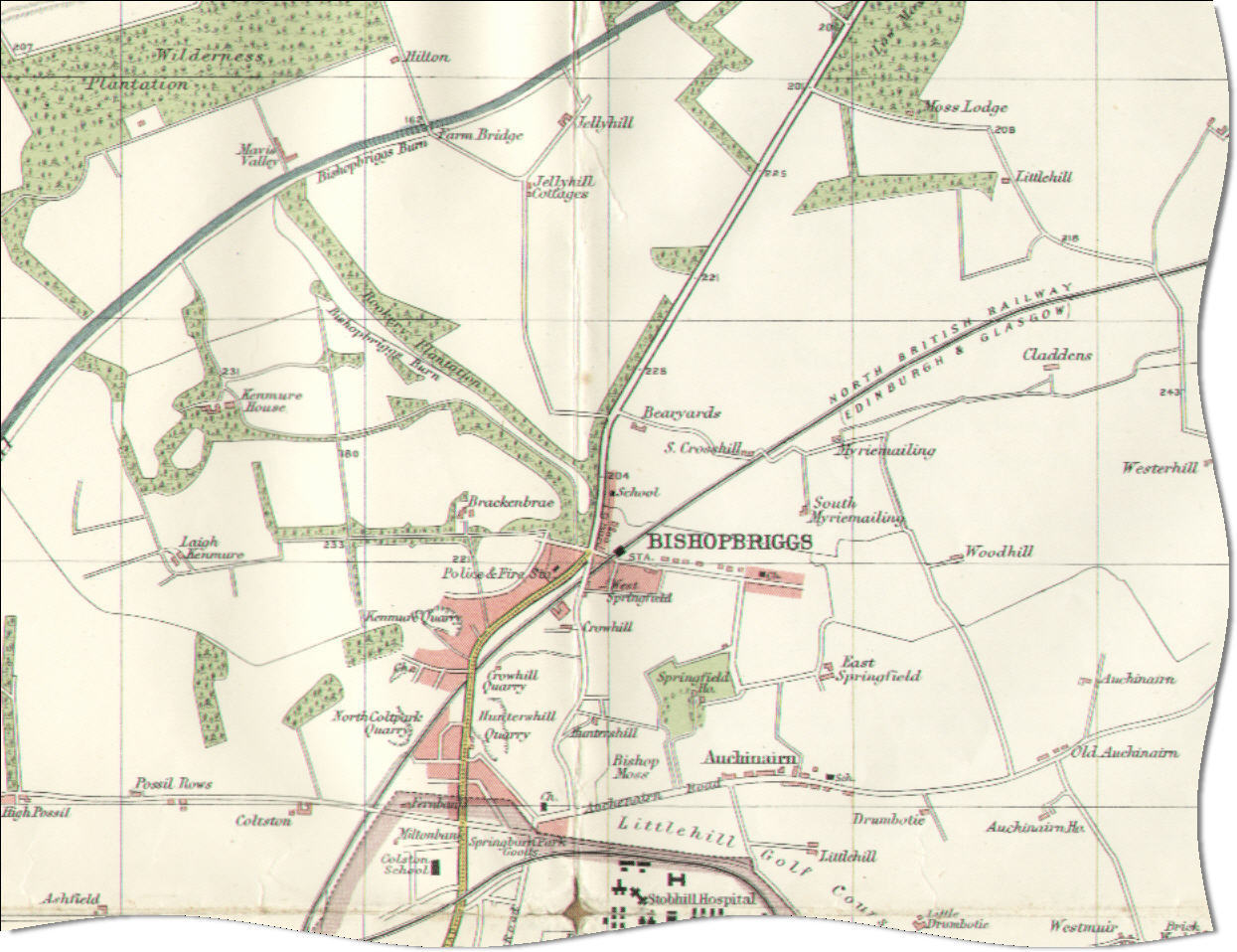
Map of Bishopbriggs and adjacent villages, published 1923

With the completion of the Forth and Clyde Canal in 1790, the area began to attract ironstone and coal mining industry. The Carron Company, became the area's main employer, building the mining villages of Mavis Valley and Jellyhill to accommodate its workers. From there, the Forth and Clyde Canal formed a convenient and direct transport link with their famous ironworks near Falkirk. There were also freestone quarries established at Coltpark (Colston), Crowhill, Huntershill and Kenmure.

Development during the 19th century was slow compared to the industrially-driven expansion of other nearby areas, such as Springburn. In 1836 Bishopbriggs' population stood at 175, compared to neighbouring Auchinairn Village's 284. Bishopbriggs railway station on the Edinburgh and Glasgow Railway, opened in 1842 however, underlining its status as the emerging focus of the local area, although expansion remained slow throughout the latter half of the 19th century. The population of Bishopbriggs was recorded as 658 in 1861 and 782 in 1871. At the time, the village had also been known as 'Bishopbridges' and was so described thus or similarly in published maps up to the mid-1850s. The arrival of the railway heralded a change, although the first printed tickets called the station Bishopbridges, platform signage showed Bishopbriggs and it has remained so ever since. Groome, in 1882, described it as being "inhabited chiefly by poor Irish families".

Cadder Yard (2 km north of the Cross) became a major facility for the routing of freight and minerals on the line. Short spurs were constructed to link the various quarries (initially with the Forth & Clyde Canal) for transportation of minerals. An underpass for the line which crosses under the A803 Kirkintilloch Road (at Hilton Road) was converted to a pedestrian subway and is still visible. Also at Cadder Yard was a short spur that connected with Bishopbriggs Oil Terminal, used as a distribution point for West of Scotland deliveries before it ultimately closed in 1982. The area continued to be a major centre for freestone quarrying during the 19th century, supplying many major municipal building projects in Glasgow, such as Sir George Gilbert Scott's new Glasgow University main building (the second largest Gothic Revival building in Britain). The blonde coloured Bishopbriggs Sandstone is from the Upper Limestone Formation of the Lower Carboniferous age. It was one of the most important Glasgow building stones, and was a major supplier of stone for Victorian Glasgow along with stone from quarries in other local areas such as Giffnock. Increasing demand for building stone and the emergence of the railways allowed for the additional transportation of red sandstone to Glasgow from quarries in Locharbriggs from the late 19th century onwards. The blonde sandstone however was still considered to be of such value that in the 1850s when the depth of overburden became too great for opencast quarrying, it was mined using the traditional pillar and stall technique. Quarrying ceased in 1907 however after a fall at Huntershill killed several men.

=== 20th century development ===
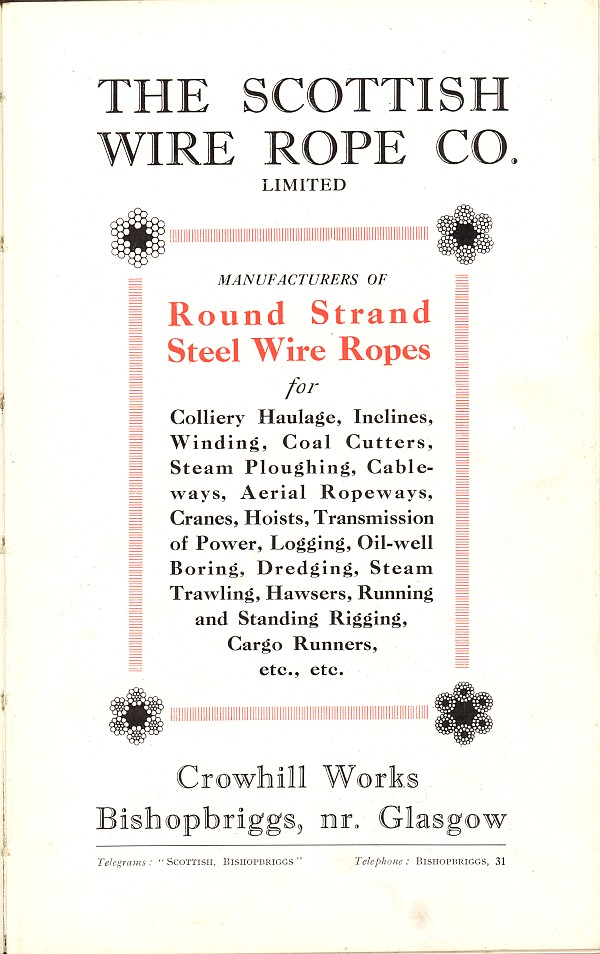
The Scottish Wire Rope Company was one of several firms that located in Bishopbriggs during the early 20th century.

With the expansion of Glasgow in the 20th century, some 2,000 acres (810 ha) of the wider parish of Cadder were eventually absorbed by Glasgow Corporation in 1926, which would be used to construct the Milton peripheral housing scheme from the late 1940s. The Glasgow tramway network was extended north from Springburn to Bishopbriggs in 1903, with a terminus at Kirkintilloch Road close to traffic lights at what is now the Triangle Shopping Centre. As all trams were required to switch tracks (and direction) at a central crossover this proved dangerous as the levels of traffic on the main road increased. The tracks were eventually relocated and a new crossover created in a short spur which required all trams to turn left and terminate at Kenmure Avenue, where they changed direction and returned southwards to Glasgow. The tram service ceased across Glasgow in 1962.

Agriculture continued to diminish in importance throughout the 20th century as demand for residential development grew; in 1920 there were 31 working farms in the area, in 1948 that number had fallen to 24 and by 1989 there were only 13 left. Bishopbriggs suffered an economic decline in the early decades of the 20th century with the working out of the quarries at that time and closure of the mines throughout the 1920s. However, Manufacturing in the town began to grow after the First World War, one of the manufacturers that located in Bishopbriggs at the time was a producer of Infant formula, Sister Lauras Food Supplement. There were also engineering firms and the Scottish Wire Rope Company factory at Crowhill, Trebor Bassett at Huntershill, and Blackie and Sons Publishers at Cadder amongst those providing alternative employment. In 1929, a new 13-acre (53,000 m^{2}) printing works for Blackie and Sons Publishers were erected on Kirkintilloch Road, retaining the name of their original Townhead works, 'The Villafield Press'. During the Second World War, Blackie & Son Ltd used part of their Bishopbriggs works for the manufacture of 3.45" shells for the Ministry of Supply. They also undertook some toolmaking for another Glasgow company, William Beardmore and Company; and, for a short time, produced aircraft radiators. By 1960 the publishing and administration section of the company also relocated from Townhead to join the printing section in Kirkintilloch Road, Bishopbriggs, and in 1971, new premises were occupied in Wester Cleddens Road, eventually becoming the headquarters of the company. The printworks were now no longer required and earmarked for demolition, following a demand for residential property in the area. The Villafield name was retained in the housing estate now on the site, opposite Cooper's Fine Fare supermarket (now Asda).

In 1932 the town saw the opening of its first (and only) cinema, The Kenmure. Located on Kirkintilloch Road it had an impressive towering facade and a single auditorium with capacity for 1000 patrons. Eventually the clientele dwindled after the arrival of television (in 1953) and by 1958 a decision was made to close it down. It lay derelict for a number of years, before being demolished to make way for the Churchill Way shopping centre which was constructed in 1962 (and demolished in 1993). The Robert McCarroll Plant Hire company was established at Crowhill in 1934 and continues to operate today. Proposals were also drawn up for the creation of a 3,000-acre (12 km^{2}) "Garden suburb" at Cadder by Patrick Abercrombie, under the instruction of Sir John Stirling-Maxwell in 1936 but by the 1950s just 26 art deco bungalows had been completed.

During the Second World War, the town was bombed by the Luftwaffe at around midnight on 7 April 1941, as part of a series of raids on the Greater Glasgow area during early 1941, which included the notorious Clydebank Blitz some three weeks earlier. Approximately five bombs were dropped in the vicinity of South Crosshill Road. One fell behind Cadder Church Hall, an annex building of Bishopbriggs School (now the library) housing the junior school, that had been converted into an Air Raid Precautions first-aid post, received a direct hit, killing five staff instantly, along with four civilian residents of South Crosshill Road. Three ARP staff were also injured in the blast and died of their injuries at Lennox Castle Hospital in Lennoxtown the next day. The only strategic targets in the area were the railway and RAF Bishopbriggs (now Low Moss Prison), a barrage balloon depot established at Cadder in 1939.

After the war, an unprecedented boost to the town's population came about as a result of the large-scale building programmes of the fifties and sixties which eventually replaced Balmuildy, Cadder and Woodhill farmlands with private housing, effectively amalgamating the various villages in the area into a single town, centred on the village of Bishopbriggs, increasing the population from 5,272 in 1951 to 21,000 in the early 1970s. The significant increase in local population was at least partially influenced by the recommendations of the Bruce Report, which advocated the reduction of the population density of inner-city Glasgow and dispersal of its population to the outskirts and suburbs of the city.

=== Recent history ===
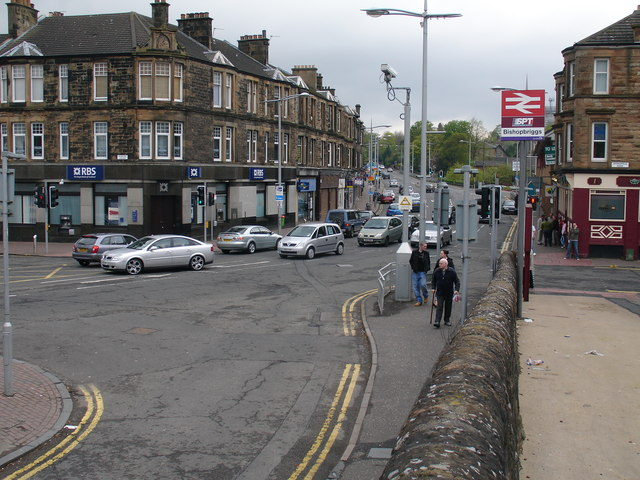
View of Bishopbriggs Cross looking north along Kirkintilloch Road from the junction with Crowhill Road.

The Town centre is known as 'The Village', 'Bishopbriggs Cross' or simply 'The Cross'. The principal retail areas are the Triangle Shopping Centre and the Cross Court. The Triangle Shopping Centre was created via the demolition of older tenement housing stock and the Kenmure Church Hall on the eastern side of Kirkintilloch Road to facilitate the construction of new development called 'The Triangle' so called due to the shape of the available land. The first floor fronting Kirkintilloch Road contained commercial offices, with its first anchor tenant as a district council office, twelve retail units, and a Morrisons (formerly Safeway) supermarket in 1991. In the Cross itself, tenement buildings dating from the Victorian era are still present on the western side of Bishopbriggs Cross. Within Bishopbriggs Cross is also a pedestrianised area at Cross Court which includes the war memorial, erected in 1920 by the Stirling family, once major land owners in the area. Other retailers in Bishopbriggs include an Asda superstore and the 300,000 square feet (28,000 m^{2}) Strathkelvin Retail Park, including a B&Q, located to the north of the town at Cadder, which opened in 1992. There was some controversy over the demolition of the former Games Hall at Bishopbriggs High in May 2010. In 2020, Aviva closed their call centre in the town which had employed 1,200 people, relocating the facility outside the town.

Plans for the refurbishment and upgrade of the Morrisons and the Triangle shopping centre were issued in 2019 and in 2023 the buildings closed for a year for major improvements. In 2023, the Bishopbriggs Town Centre Regeneration project was launched under the local council's £34 million regeneration scheme, which included plans for a new civic space. The Distribution centre of publisher HarperCollins, located in the Westerhill area of Bishopbriggs (formerly William Collins, Sons and Co Ltd had moved there from Townhead in the early 1970s) left Bishopbriggs in 2025.

== Education ==
The area is served by six Primary schools; Balmuildy, Meadowburn, St Helen's, St Matthew's, Thomas Muir and Wester Cleddens. Meadowburn Primary School hosts a Gaelic Medium Unit. There are also two Secondary schools, both of which have been rebuilt as the result of a Public-Private Partnership investment into education infrastructure, first launched in 2006 by East Dunbartonshire Council.

Bishopbriggs has two secondary schools; Bishopbriggs Academy (Non-denominational) at Woodhill and Turnbull High School (Roman Catholic) at Kenmure. Both schools rank as some of the best in Scotland, with Bishopbriggs being named Scottish State School of the year in both 2014 and 2017. Both schools have had new-build campuses built, which were completed in August 2009.

Bishopbriggs Academy was established in 2006 via the amalgamation of Bishopbriggs High School and Thomas Muir High School and was initially housed in the old Bishopbriggs High School building. The new building for Bishopbriggs Academy was scheduled to be built at the site of the old Bishopbriggs High School campus near Bishopbriggs Cross. However, after representations from the contractors, it was relocated to the former Thomas Muir High School site at Woodhill. The decision to change the location of the new school went against public opinion and caused significant local controversy at the time. The relocation has, however, made a large area of land adjacent to the Cross available for redevelopment.

In addition to these schools, there is also St Mary's on the edge of Bishopbriggs, which is a secure residential school for Young offenders on remand, under sentence and Children's Panel Orders. It is a modern, purpose built secure unit for 24 young people aged between 11 and 16.

== Healthcare ==
There has been controversy over the decision by NHS Greater Glasgow to downgrade facilities at the local Stobhill Hospital in nearby Springburn to an Ambulatory care facility, which will result in the nearest Accident and Emergency and inpatient facilities being located at the Glasgow Royal Infirmary in the city centre, as well as the development of an inpatient Psychiatric hospital at the site. This resulted in Jean Turner's election as the Independent Member of the Scottish Parliament for Strathkelvin and Bearsden on this single issue in 2003, however she eventually lost her seat to Labour's David Whitton in the 2007 elections for the Scottish Parliament.

== Religion ==
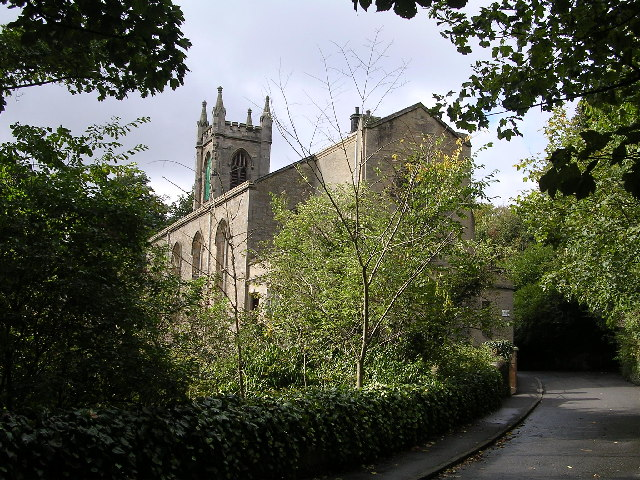
Cadder has been the site of a Christian place of worship for over 850 years. The present church was designed by David Hamilton and completed in 1825.

The Church of Scotland has three churches and parishes in the town, Cadder, Kenmure and Springfield Cambridge. Colston Wellpark Church also serves the southern end of the town at the Glasgow boundary. The neighbouring parish of Robroyston has also been set up to accommodate the growing population on the outskirts of Bishopbrigs. The Free Church of Scotland worships at its church at Auchinairn Road. The Scottish Episcopal Church of St James The Less is situated on Hilton Road, having transferred from Springburn in 1980.

There are also two Roman Catholic Parishes in the town, St Matthew's parish was founded in 1946 and the C-listed church building was designed by Gillespie, Kidd & Coia, opening in 1950, featuring sculpture panels by Benno Schotz depicting the life of St. Matthew. To reflect the ongoing expansion of the town, St Dominic's parish was established in 1973 and the church building completed in 1977. Bishopbriggs Community Church has premises at Park Avenue, behind the Asda store, serving the whole town. Woodhill Evangelical Church, situated on Westercleddens Road, also serves the whole town. There is also a Kingdom Hall of Jehovah's Witnesses in the town which is shared by Bishopbriggs and Kirkintilloch Congregations.

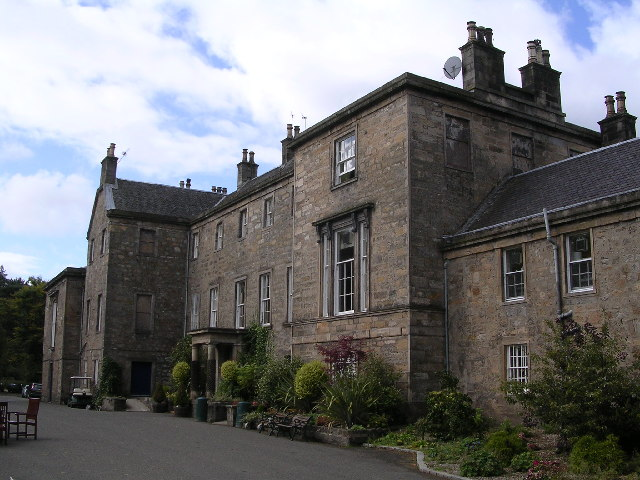
Cawder House, built in 1654, is now the clubhouse of Cawder Golf Club.

== Other economic and social amenities ==
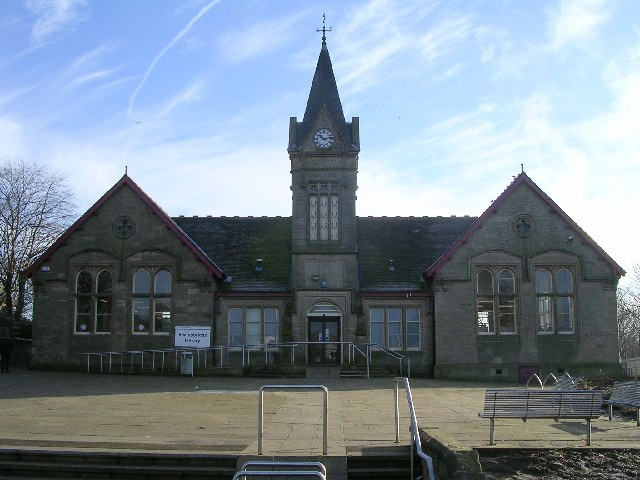
Bishopbriggs Library was opened in 1965, in the former buildings of the Bishopbriggs School, which date from 1896.

Other amenities include a municipal library, which forms a local landmark, housed in the B-Listed former buildings of the Bishopbriggs School, which was first opened in 1896 and was converted to a library when the new Bishopbriggs High School opened in 1965. The library was enhanced by a £400,000 refurbishment in 2003.

In Westerhill is an automotive Graphic design firm John McGavigan, which employs around 135 people. The Moulsdale charitable foundation has its HQ in the town. Bishopbriggs is also the location of a number of firms operating in the construction sector, with Carillion (approx 250), Carillion Training Services/TIGERS STA Training (currently there is approximately 100 live apprentices training at Huntershill Village depot, with over 600 apprentices having been registered over the last 6 years 2009–15), the Robert McCarroll Plant Hire company, Roofing contractor Marley Contract Services and Civil Engineering firm Luddon Construction based in the town.

Bishopbriggs still remains predominantly a commuter suburb of Glasgow however, with around 80% of its workforce commuting to work in the wider Greater Glasgow area.

HMP Low Moss was located on the outskirts of the town at the site of a former World War II Royal Air Force Barrage balloon station, near to the Strathkelvin Retail Park and Low Moss Industrial Estate at Cadder. In early January 2007, it was announced that the Scottish Executive had overruled the initial objection by East Dunbartonshire Council for the prison to be extensively modernised and extended, and after completion was to be three times its previous size, capable of containing 700 inmates in a medium-security facility. The prison closed in May 2007 and construction began in February 2010, with the new prison opening in March 2012.

== Politics ==
For local government, Bishopbriggs was originally part of the historic county of Lanarkshire, which continues to function as a Lieutenancy area. A successful campaign by the local Ratepayers Association won Bishopbriggs its late bid for independent Burgh status in 1964, in order to avoid being absorbed into the Glasgow Corporation's boundaries, resulting in the formation of Bishopbriggs Town Council. Following local government reorganisation, dissolution of the burgh system, and the creation of Regional and District Authorities, as a result of the Local Government (Scotland) Act 1973, Bishopbriggs became part of the Strathclyde Region in 1975. The local Ratepayers Association again played a major role in keeping Bishopbriggs outwith Glasgow district and within the Strathkelvin district of the Strathclyde Region, along with Kirkintilloch and Lenzie.

With the introduction of the present unitary local government system in 1996, and the dissolution of the Regional and District setup, as a result of the Local Government etc. (Scotland) Act 1994, Bishopbriggs became part of the East Dunbartonshire Council area. As a result of the Local Governance (Scotland) Act 2004 and following a further boundary review in 2017, the town is now represented on the council by two multi-member wards: Bishopbriggs South with three councillors, and Bishopbriggs North & Campsie with four councillors.

In the national government, Bishopbriggs is represented by the Strathkelvin and Bearsden constituency of the Scottish Parliament with the MSP being Rona Mackay of the Scottish National Party (SNP), as well as the 7 additional list MSPs that make up the West of Scotland region. The town is represented at Westminster by the East Dunbartonshire constituency of the House of Commons, with the MP being Susan Murray of the Liberal Democrats. Both constituencies are considered to be Marginal seats, with relatively high numbers of Swing votes. Prior to Brexit in 2020 it was part of the Scotland European Parliament Constituency.

== Transport ==
Glasgow International Airport, at Paisley, is the nearest commercial airport serving the Greater Glasgow region, however a private landing strip at Cumbernauld Airport services smaller aircraft and helicopters. Bishopbriggs is connected to the UK motorway network at Junction 2 of the M80 motorway at Robroyston. This interchange connects with the Bishopbriggs Relief Road that runs from Robroyston, bypassing Bishopbriggs to the east of Woodhill and Westerhill before linking up with the Torrance Roundabout near Low Moss. The main road through Bishopbriggs itself is Kirkintilloch Road, part of the A803 which connects Glasgow to Falkirk and Grangemouth.

The town is served by Bishopbriggs railway station, and is the first stop for local trains departing from Glasgow Queen Street station on the Croy Line to Stirling. All rail services are provided by ScotRail. Journey time to Glasgow is approximately 6 minutes.

Buses provide services through the town towards the Kelvin Valley (Kirkintilloch, Torrance, Kilsyth). Long-distance services to Stirling and Falkirk were discontinued in 2017. Bus companies include First Glasgow (service 87 to Woodhill and services 88 and 89 through the town centre), in addition to a local circular service 142 from Glasgow Citybus (previously operated by John Morrow Coaches) that runs a local route around the town. This service links the Cross, Mavis Valley, Cadder, Strathkelvin Retail Park, Woodhill and Auchinairn from 0800 to 1700 Mon-Fri. Additional services 147 (to Scotstoun) and 148 (to Clydebank) are infrequent and used only to facilitate trips to the bus depot. Defunct operator Kelvin Scottish Buses had their headquarters in the town at Westerhill Road.

=== Canal ===
The Bishopbriggs section of the Forth and Clyde Canal opened in 1775 and when completed, connected the River Clyde, at Bowling, to the River Forth, at Grangemouth. Junctions at Falkirk with the Union Canal and at Maryhill to the Monkland Canal completed the network. The canal reopened in 2003 to non-commercial navigation as part of the Millennium Project. This included the newly reconstructed Farm Bridge over the Canal at Mavis Valley, adjacent to the Leisuredrome. The previous fixed Girder bridge replaced an older Bascule bridge, and was built after the closure of the canal in 1962. It had been set at a very low level, inhibiting canal navigation. Farm Bridge was also known as "Brash's Bridge" because members of the Brash family held the post of bridge-keeper for over a century, from 1838 to 1942. Brash's bridge-house was on the north bank of the canal, beside the bridge. There is another road bridge across the canal at Cadder.

== Culture and sports ==
Located near Bishopbriggs Cross are the former playing fields of Glasgow-based Allan Glen's School, which opened in 1923 and continue to be used by Allan Glen's RFC, who play in the National League Division 3. The club has teams covering all age groups, from Primary 1 all the way up to the senior 1st XV team. Former Scotland and Glasgow Warriors captain Alastair Kellock started his rugby days at Allan Glens. Among the youth and junior football teams that play in the town are Rossvale, Westpark, and East Dunbartonshire F.C.

The town has three golf courses. The oldest, Bishopbriggs Golf Club, was founded in 1906 and is situated in parkland which was once part of Kenmure House (built 1806 by David Hamilton, demolished 1955), formerly family seat of the Stirling-Maxwell Baronets. Cadder House, built in 1654, was also a Stirling family residence. It is now the clubhouse of Cawder Golf Club, which was established in 1933. Both original courses were designed by James Braid. The town has two bowling clubs; Bishopbriggs Bowling Club and Auchinairn Bowling Club.

The town has a curling club, Cadder Curling Club, which originally met in Cawder Estate but now meets at Braehead. The town has 3 Boys Brigades (182 Glasgow, 212 Glasgow and 268 Glasgow), a Scout group (175th Glasgow), a Girls Guides and a Girls Brigade. There is also numerous, much smaller groups often linked to local churches.

== Noted residents ==
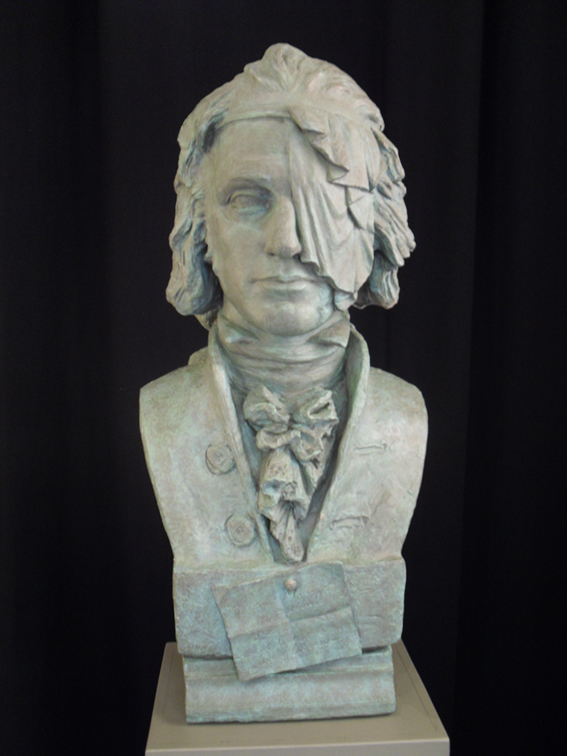
Bust of Thomas Muir by Scottish artist and sculptor to the Queen, Alexander Stoddart. It is on permanent exhibition at Bishopbriggs library (part of the Thomas Muir Exhibition). A replica was also commissioned for the Museum of Australian Democracy and is on exhibition in Canberra.

Residents born or who have lived in the area include the political reformer Thomas Muir of Huntershill, the actor and writer Dirk Bogarde, TV and National Lottery draw presenter Jenni Falconer, singer Amy Macdonald, former Miss Scotland and Miss United Kingdom Nieve Jennings, actor and rock singer Steve Valentine, footballer Stuart Bannigan, poet laureate (makar) and novelist Professor Jackie Kay, musicians Paul Buchanan and Paul Joseph Moore from The Blue Nile and bassist Jack Bruce of Cream.

STV presenter Storm Huntley resides in the Meadowburn area where she attended Primary School. Humorists Sanjeev Kohli who played Navid in Scottish sitcom Still Game and his brother Hardeep Singh Kohli, a contributor on BBC magazine shows moved at a young age to Bishopbriggs and spent their childhood here. Oscar-winning director and actor Peter Capaldi attended St Matthew's Primary school.

Sports people include Alastair Kellock, Scotland cap, lock and captain of Rugby Union side Glasgow Warriors in the Celtic League who attended Bishopbriggs High School. Former Birmingham City F.C. and Scotland striker James McFadden attended Turnbull High School as did former Celtic and Partick Thistle striker Gerry Britton, previously manager of Stranraer F.C. and now Chief Executive Officer of Partick Thistle.

== Climate ==
Climate data for Springburn (1991-2020 averages, precipitation days 1981-2010)
Month	Jan	Feb	Mar	Apr	May	Jun	Jul	Aug	Sep	Oct	Nov	Dec	Year
Mean daily maximum °C (°F)	6.3 (43.3)	7.0 (44.6)	9.1 (48.4)	12.1 (53.8)	15.3 (59.5)	17.7 (63.9)	19.2 (66.6)	18.6 (65.5)	16.1 (61.0)	12.4 (54.3)	8.9 (48.0)	6.4 (43.5)	12.4 (54.4)
Mean daily minimum °C (°F)	1.3 (34.3)	1.4 (34.5)	2.5 (36.5)	4.3 (39.7)	6.5 (43.7)	9.8 (49.6)	11.2 (52.2)	11.2 (52.2)	9.1 (48.4)	6.1 (43.0)	3.4 (38.1)	1.3 (34.3)	5.7 (42.2)
Average precipitation mm (inches)	112.1 (4.41)	98.0 (3.86)	87.3 (3.44)	65.1 (2.56)	63.4 (2.50)	71.1 (2.80)	97.2 (3.83)	106.1 (4.18)	100.5 (3.96)	124.5 (4.90)	110.2 (4.34)	117.9 (4.64)	1,153.4 (45.42)
Average precipitation days (≥ 1.0 mm)	17.0	13.5	15.7	12.5	12.0	11.7	12.7	14.1	13.8	16.6	15.9	14.7	170.2
Mean monthly sunshine hours	38.8	64.8	91.3	136.6	182.6	154.4	149.4	138.8	112.7	81.0	50.3	33.3	1,234
Source: Met Office

== Twin towns ==
Bishopbriggs is twinned with:

- Corbeil-Essonnes, France
- Yoichi, Japan
