= Corncockle Sandstone Formation =

Geologic formation in Scotland

- Stratigraphic range: Cisuralian
- Type: Geological formation
- Unit of: Stewartry Group
- Underlies: Lochmaben Formation
- Overlies: Hartfield Formation
- Area: Lochmaben Basin
- Thickness: 900+ m

Lithology
- Primary: Sandstone

Location
- Country: Scotland

Type section
- Named for: Corncockle Quarry

The Corncockle Sandstone Formation is a formation of Cisuralian age (Early Permian). It is part of the fill of the Lochmaben Basin in the Southern Uplands. It forms part of the Stewartry Group.
