= Locharbriggs =

Coordinates: 55°06′N 3°35′W

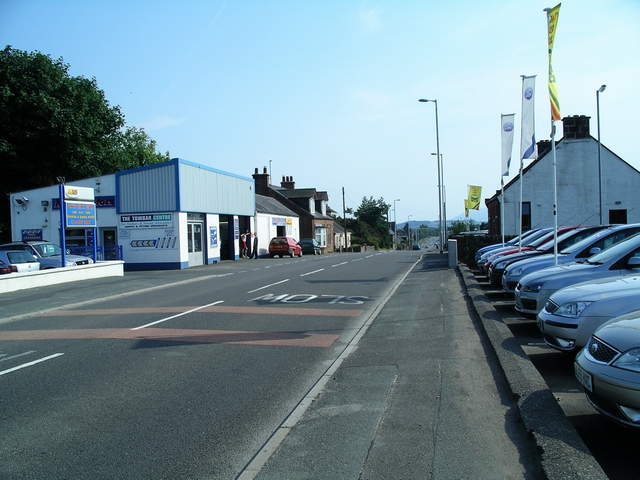
- Locharbriggs

- Location within Dumfries and Galloway
- Population: 5,610 (2020)
- OS grid reference: NX9980
- Council area: Dumfries and Galloway
- Country: Scotland
- Sovereign state: United Kingdom
- Post town: DUMFRIES
- Postcode district: DG1
- Dialling code: 01387
- Police: Scotland
- Fire: Scottish
- Ambulance: Scottish

Locharbriggs is a village in Dumfries and Galloway, Scotland. It is located near the Lochar Water, 2.7 miles (4.3 km) north-northeast of the town of Dumfries. It was one of several villages that stood on the edge of the Lochar Moss which was largely reclaimed in the 19th century. The Locharbriggs locality (which also includes neighbouring Heathhall) had an estimated population of 5,610 in 2020.

Locharbriggs is known for the quarrying of distinctive red sandstone of the Locharbriggs Sandstone Formation. This has been used for buildings in towns and cities including Dumfries, Glasgow and Edinburgh. The stone has also been exported further afield, including for the construction of the steps of the Statue of Liberty in New York. Only one quarry now remains active.

The village's amenities include bus services, three local shops, a public house (the Lochar Inn), a social club, a Chinese takeaway, fish and chip shop, hairdressers, community centre, a library, and a primary school.

Transport links from Locharbriggs to Dumfries often suffer during school holidays, when major works are routinely carried out on the main A701 trunk road.
