= Murray Hall (politician) =

American politician

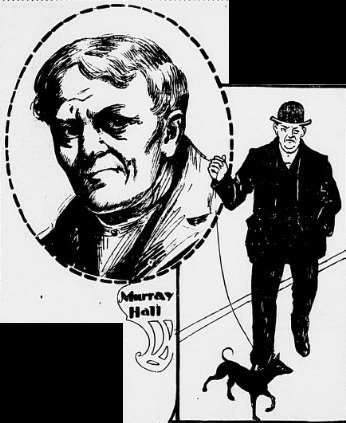
Depictions of Hall in The Evening World, January 18, 1901, night edition

Murray H. Hall (1841 − January 16, 1901) was a New York City bail bondsman and Tammany Hall politician who became famous on his death in 1901 when it was revealed that he was a transgender man.

Born in Govan, Scotland, he began wearing male attire and using the name "John Anderson" aged 16. Hall reportedly migrated to America after being reported to the police by his first wife and lived as a man for nearly 25 years, able to vote and to work as a politician at a time when women were denied such rights. He also ran a commercial "intelligence office." At the time of his death, he resided with his second wife and their adopted daughter. His biological sex had been a secret even to his own daughter and friends, who continued to respect his expression after death. After his death, an aide to a state senator remarked "If he was a woman he ought to have been born a man, for he lived and looked like one."

His last home was an apartment in Greenwich Village, half a block north of the Jefferson Market Courthouse (now the Jefferson Market Library). The building was renumbered in 1929, when Manhattan's Sixth Avenue was extended south, and is now 453 6th Avenue. The NYC LGBT Historic Sites Project lists the building.

Hall died from breast cancer, treatment for which he seemed to have delayed for fear of exposing his biological sex. He was buried in women's clothes in an unmarked grave in Mount Olivet Cemetery.
