= Cadder Yard =

Former railway yard in Scotland

Coordinates: 55°54.8296′N 4°11.4744′W

Cadder Yard is the railway yard situated between Bishopbriggs and Lenzie on the Edinburgh and Glasgow Railway (E&G). Cadder is a district of the town of Bishopbriggs.

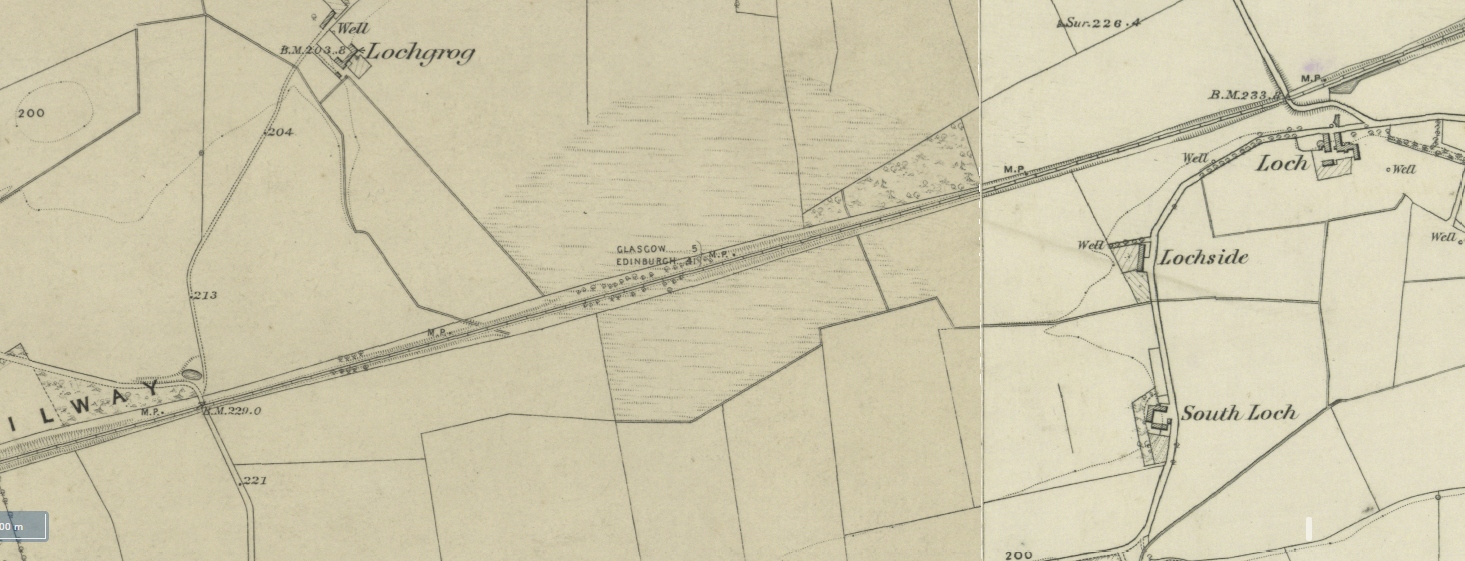
The site of Cadder Yard 1843-1882

It was a hump shunting yard built by the North British Railway (NBR) in October 1901 as part of the Sighthill Goods Yard and High Street Goods Yard modernisation scheme. In the early days the majority of the railway workings were on the north side of the E&G, i.e., the up-yard. The hump was located to the North-West. With the modern changes of emphasis in British Rail freight almost all of the rail workings on the north side and signal boxes were removed in the 1970s and 1980s.

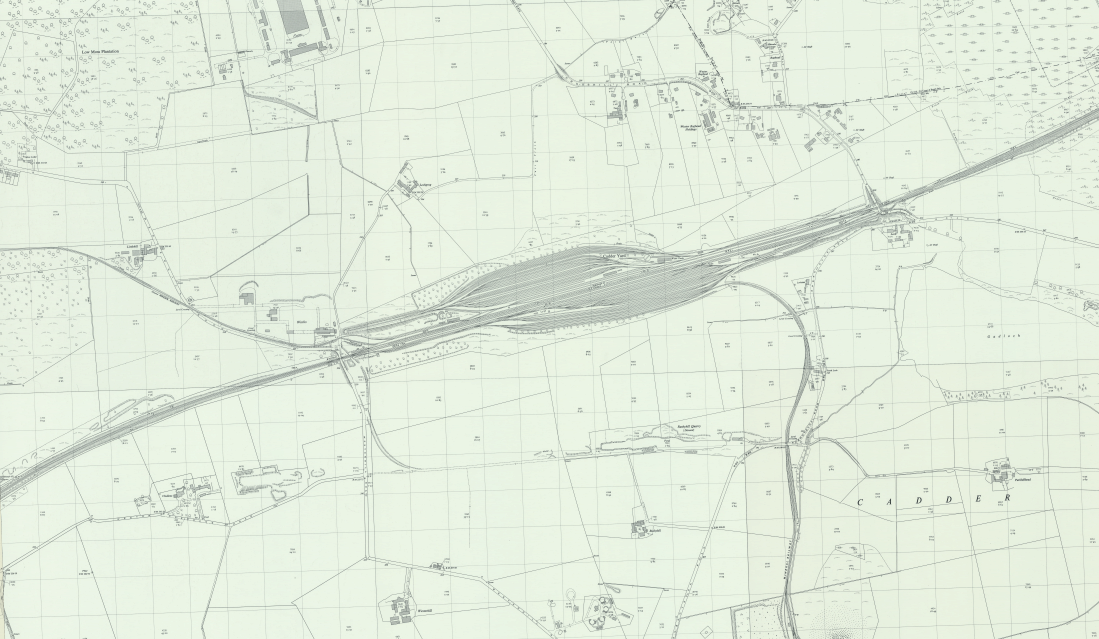
Cadder Yard Map circa 1960

The passing loops on either side of the main line have been retained and are used on a daily basis. The north side, beyond the up-loop, is a large Green Link tree-planting project. On the south side, beyond the down-loops, are maintenance sidings.

Direct Rail Services (DRS) leased the site from July 2006 - May 2011 where it was used as a wagon maintenance and storage location. Subsequently, DRS opted to move these operations to Motherwell TMD. This move might have been due to the lack of covered facilities, or to the EGIP construction plans.

In 2016, Cadder Down Yard was the site of EGIP electrification construction depot. At the time, this was, "subject to satisfactory negotiations with the current rail industry tenant to relocate their rail activities to another location in the West of Scotland." As of late 2021, this £33 million infrastructure development is now operational.

Westerhill, at the far west end of Cadder Yard is the proposed site for a railway park and ride service in Bishopbriggs in a campaign by local councillors.

== Branches and spurs ==
A short goods branch called the Wilderness Plantation spur started from the west end of the yard and ran to the Bishopbriggs Oil Depot (closed in the 1980s) and onwards to the Mavis Valley and its colliery. Possibly connected with this, there was also a mineral railway spur to the south leaving from the west end of the yard, which can be seen on the maps: Old Ordnance Survey, Lenzie; Bartholomew. This railway crossed the B812 Robroyston Road. Further, there seems to have been an additional short spur leaving the east end of the yard and heading south close to the B812. These spurs are long gone, the Wilderness Plantation spur was victim of the Beeching cuts.

== Incidents ==
One of the last public executions in the Glasgow area took place on the site of the yard. It was in December 1840 that a foreman for the Edinburgh & Glasgow railway contractors was murdered, allegedly by three navvies, at Crosshill Bridge at the east end of the yard. Two of the navvies were hanged in 1841 where they had committed the deed.

A serious fire occurred on an Edinburgh - Glasgow train on 16 August 1983 at Cadder. The train came to a stand opposite to Cadder Signal Box after passengers had pulled the emergency alarm. The signals were set to danger and luckily there was no train approaching on the adjacent line. Injuries to passengers were minor.
