= John Watson Gordon =

Scottish painter (1788–1864)

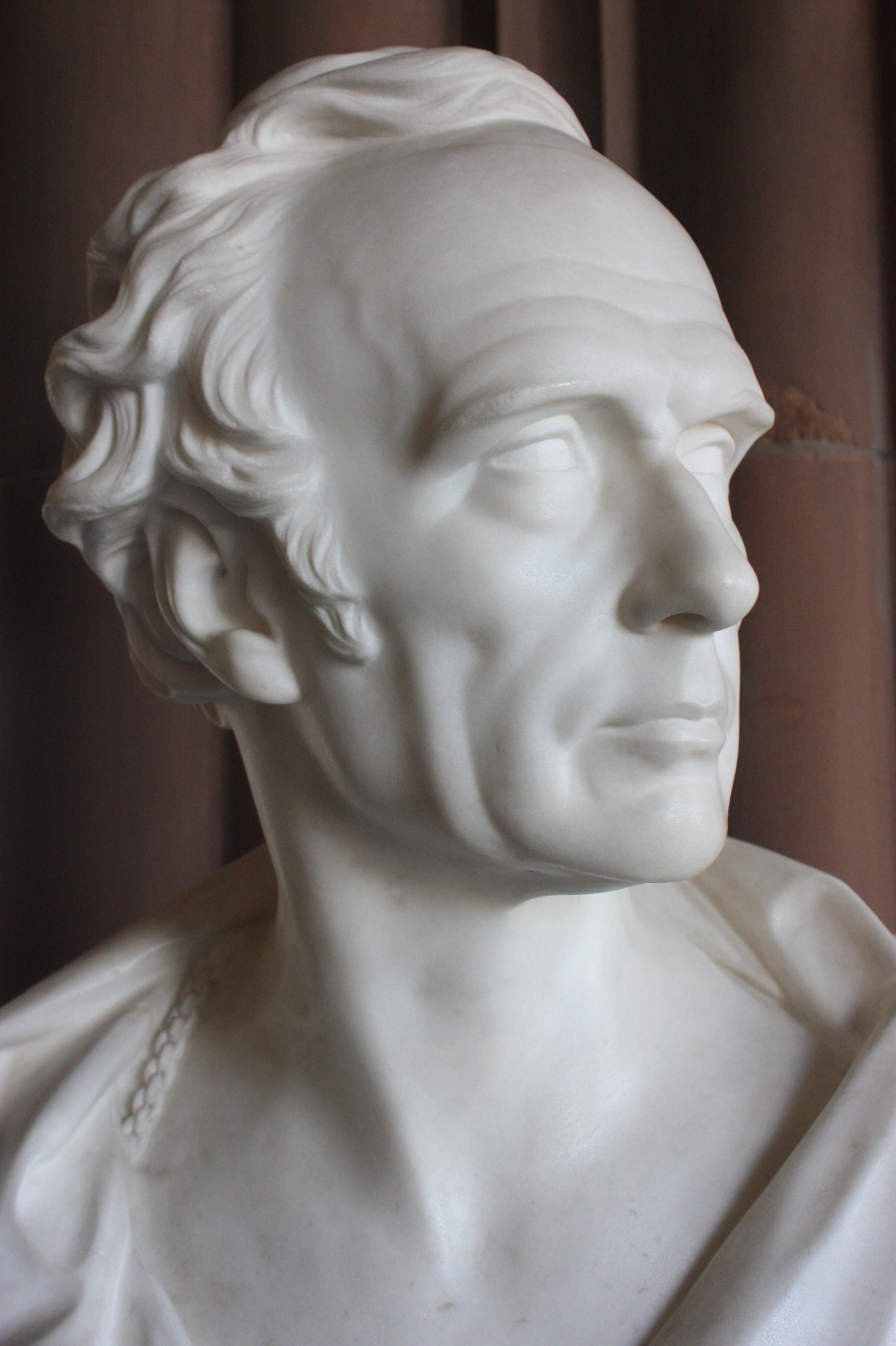
Sir John Watson Gordon by Patric Park, 1852

Sir John Watson Gordon PRSA RA (1788 – 1 June 1864) was a Scottish portrait painter and president of the Royal Scottish Academy.

== Life and work ==
Gordon was born in 1788, in Edinburgh, the eldest son of Captain Watson, R.A., a cadet of the family of Watson of Overmains, in the county of Berwick. He was educated specifically to prepare him for enrolling in the Royal Engineers. He entered as a student in the government school of design, under the management of the Board of Manufactures. he showed a natural aptitude for art, and his father was persuaded to allow him to adopt it as his profession. Captain Watson was himself a skilful draughtsman, and his brother George Watson, afterwards president of the Royal Scottish Academy, was a highly respected portrait painter, second only to Sir Henry Raeburn, who was a friend of the family.

In 1808, Gordon exhibited a picture "The Lay of the Last Minstrel" at the Lyceum in Nicolson Street, Edinburgh – the first public exhibition of paintings in that city – and continued for some years to exhibit fancy subjects; but, although freely and sweetly painted, they were altogether without the force and character which stamped his portrait pictures as the works of a master. After the death of Sir Henry Raeburn in 1823 he succeeded to much of his practice. He assumed the name of Gordon in 1826.

One of the earliest of his famous sitters was Sir Walter Scott, who sat for a first portrait in 1820. Then came JG Lockhart in 1821; Professor Wilson, 1822 and 1850, two portraits; Sir Archibald Alison, 1839; Dr Chalmers, 1844; a little later De Quincey, and Sir David Brewster, 1864. Among his most important works may be mentioned the 1st Marquess of Dalhousie; Sir Alexander Hope (1835); Lord President Hope; and Dr Chalmers. These, unlike his later works, are generally rich in colour. The full-length of Dr Alexander Brunton (1844), and Dr Lee, the principal of the university (1846), mark a modification of his style, which ultimately resolved itself into extreme simplicity, both of colour and treatment.

During the last twenty years of his life he painted many distinguished Englishmen who came to Edinburgh to sit to him. And it is significant that David Cox, the landscape painter, on being presented with his portrait, subscribed for by many friends, chose to go to Edinburgh to have it executed by Watson Gordon, although he neither knew the painter personally nor had ever before visited the country. Among the portraits painted during this period, in what may be termed his third style, are De Quincey; General Sir Thomas Macdougall Brisbane; the Prince of Wales, Lord Macaulay, M. Packington, Lord Murray, Lord Cockburn, Lord Rutherfurd and Sir John Shaw-Lefevre.

These latter pictures are mostly clear and grey, sometimes showing little or no positive colour, the flesh itself being very grey, and the handling extremely masterly, though never obtruding its cleverness. He was very successful in rendering acute observant character. A good example of his last style, showing pearly flesh-painting freely handled, yet highly finished, is his head of Sir John Shaw-Lefevre.

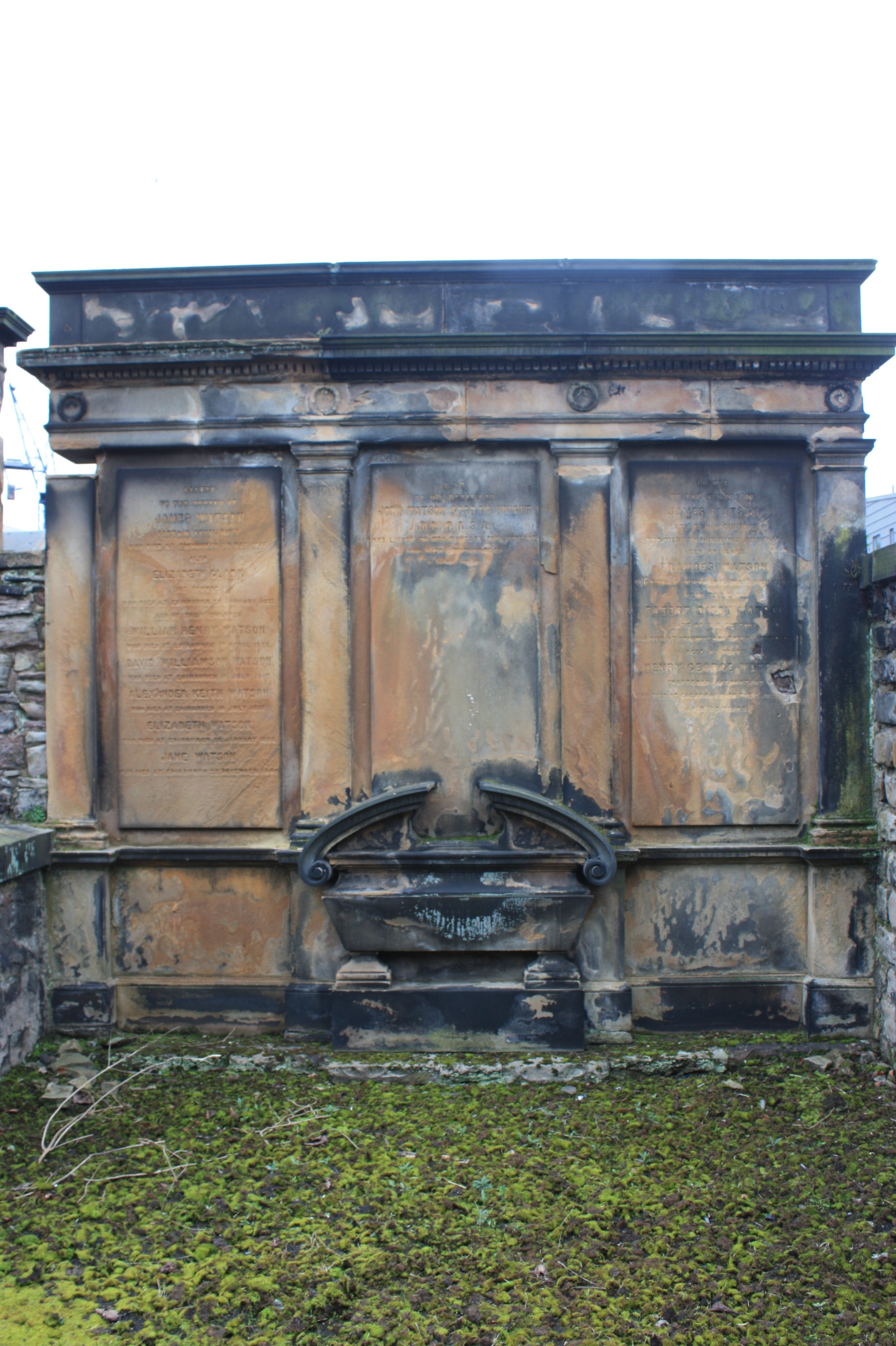
The grave of Sir John Watson Gordon, Canongate Kirkyard

Gordon was one of the earlier members of the Royal Scottish Academy, and was elected its president in 1850; he was at the same time appointed limner for Scotland to the queen, and received the honour of knighthood. Since 1841 he had been an associate of the Royal Academy, and in 1851 he was elected a royal academician.

He is buried in the eastern extension of Canongate Kirkyard on the Royal Mile in Edinburgh.

== Gallery ==
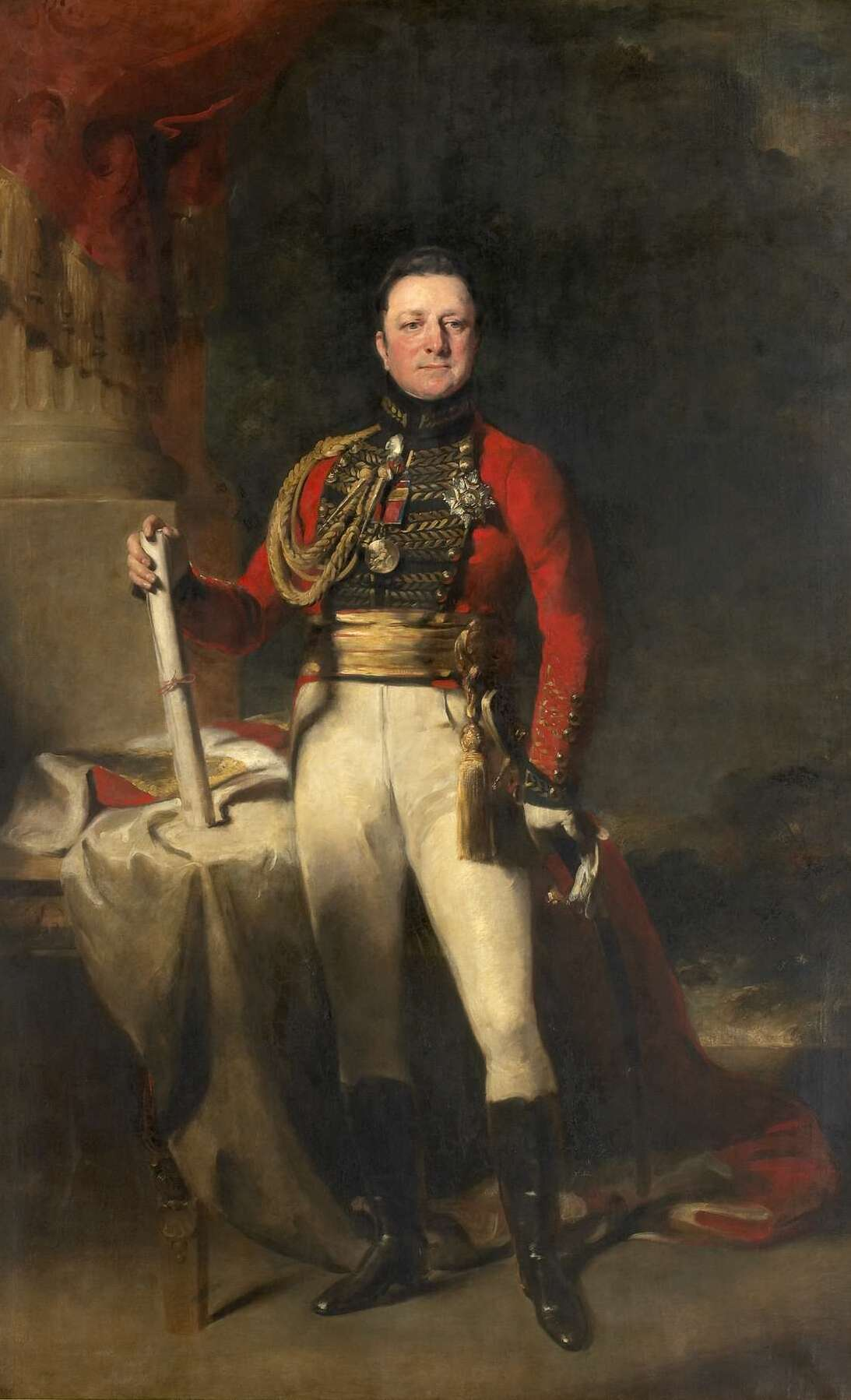
George Ramsay, 9th Earl of Dalhousie, 1829

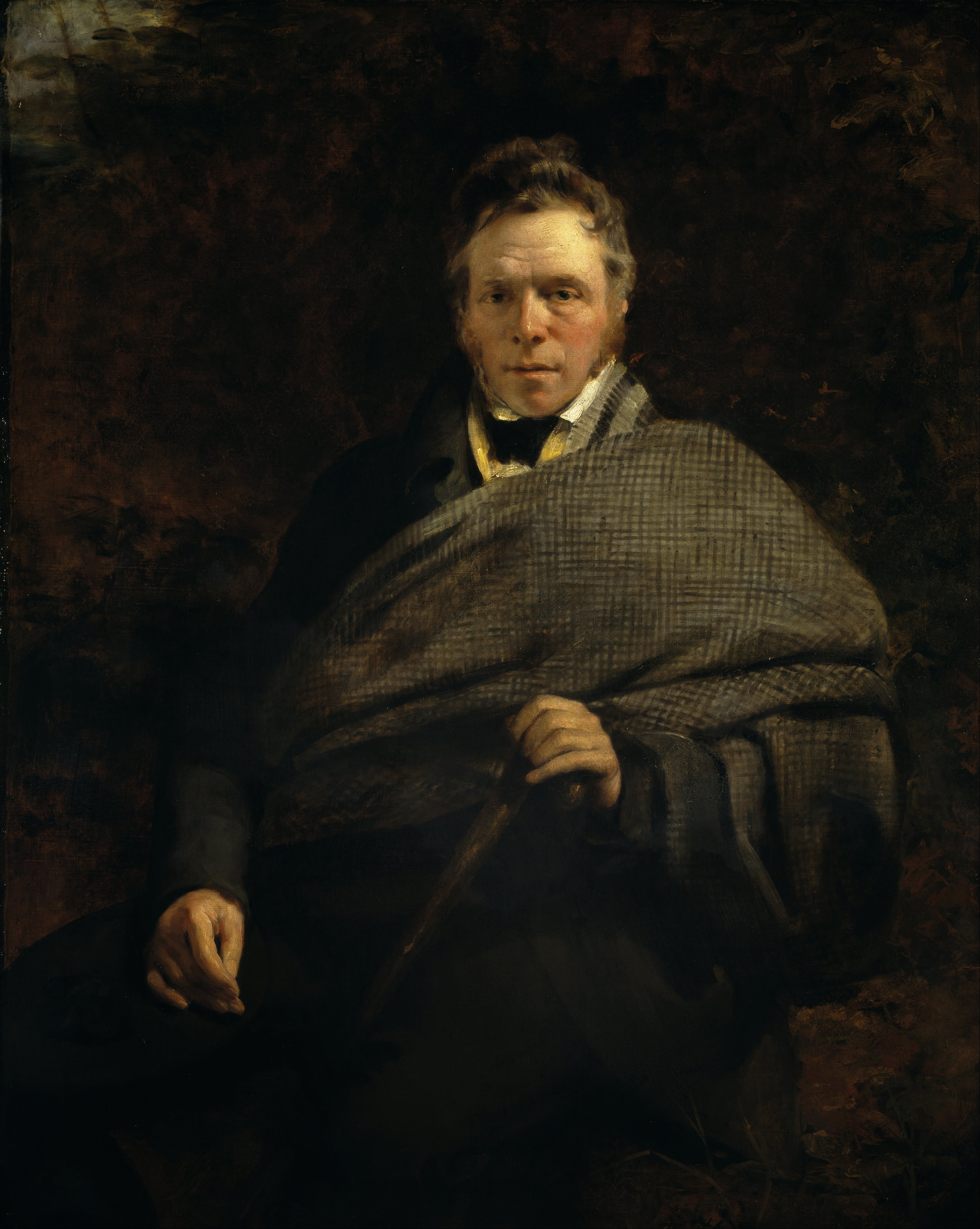
James Hogg, 1830

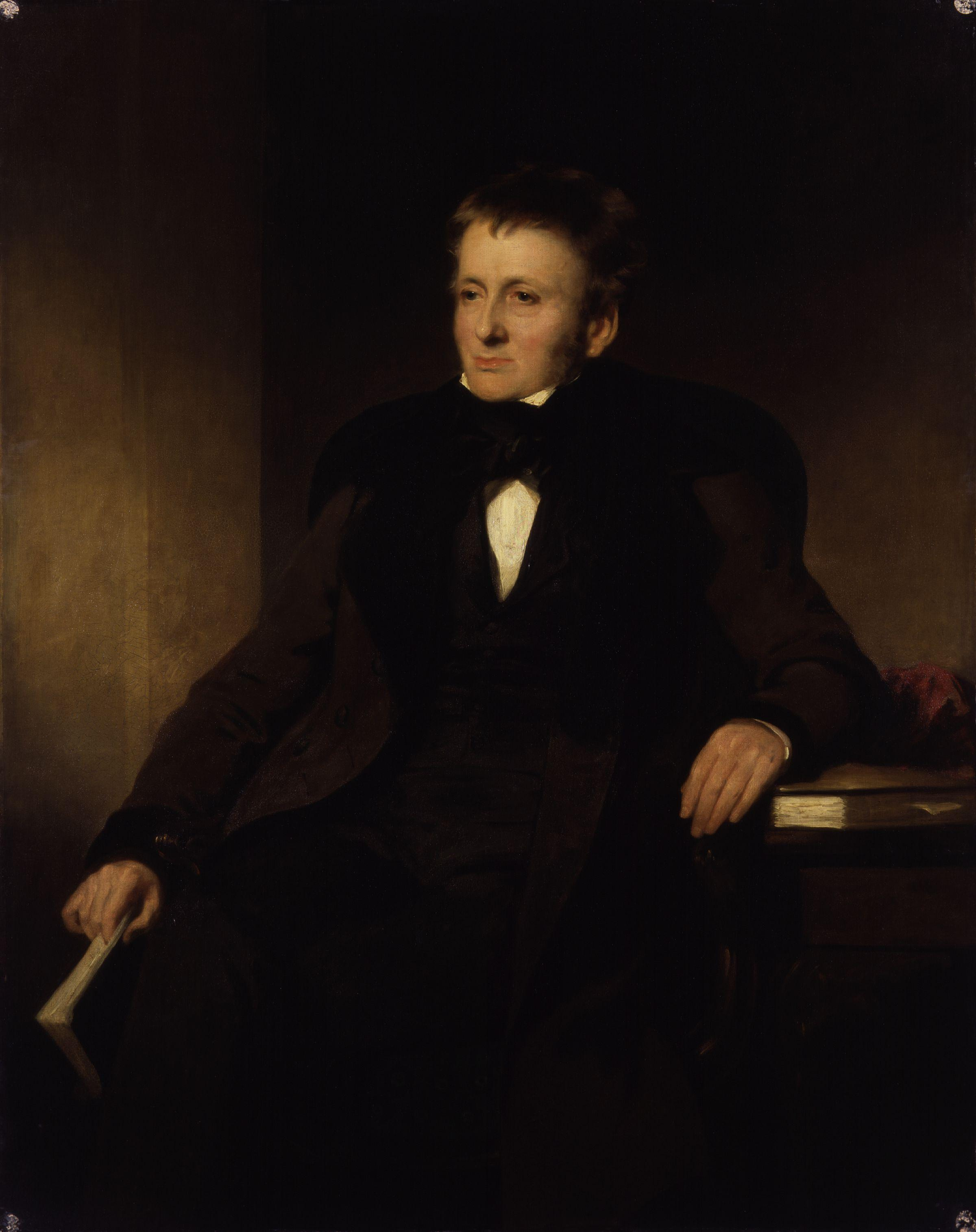
Portrait of Thomas de Quincey, c. 1845

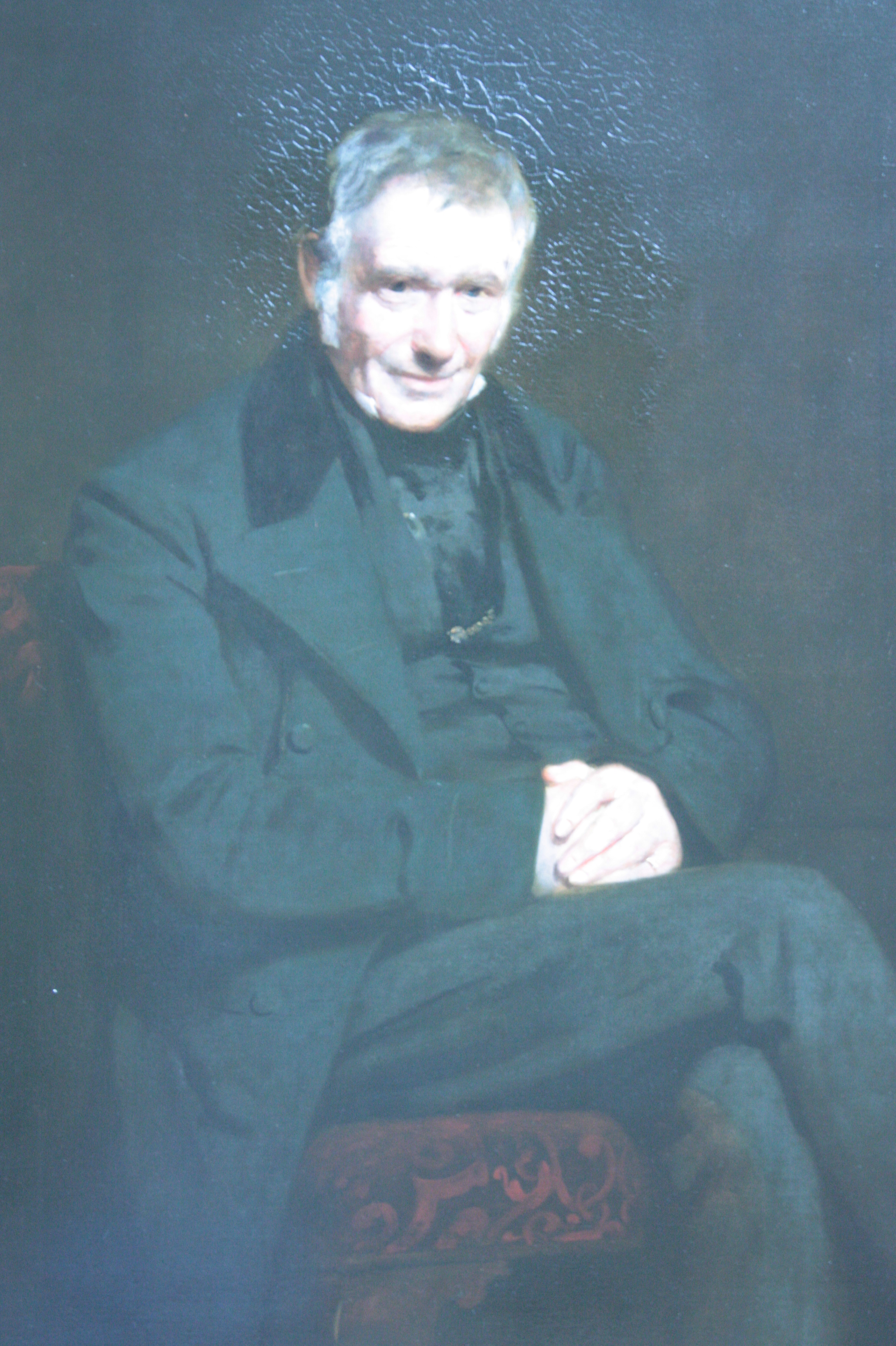
Roderick Gray, Factor to the Merchant Maiden Hospital, 1852

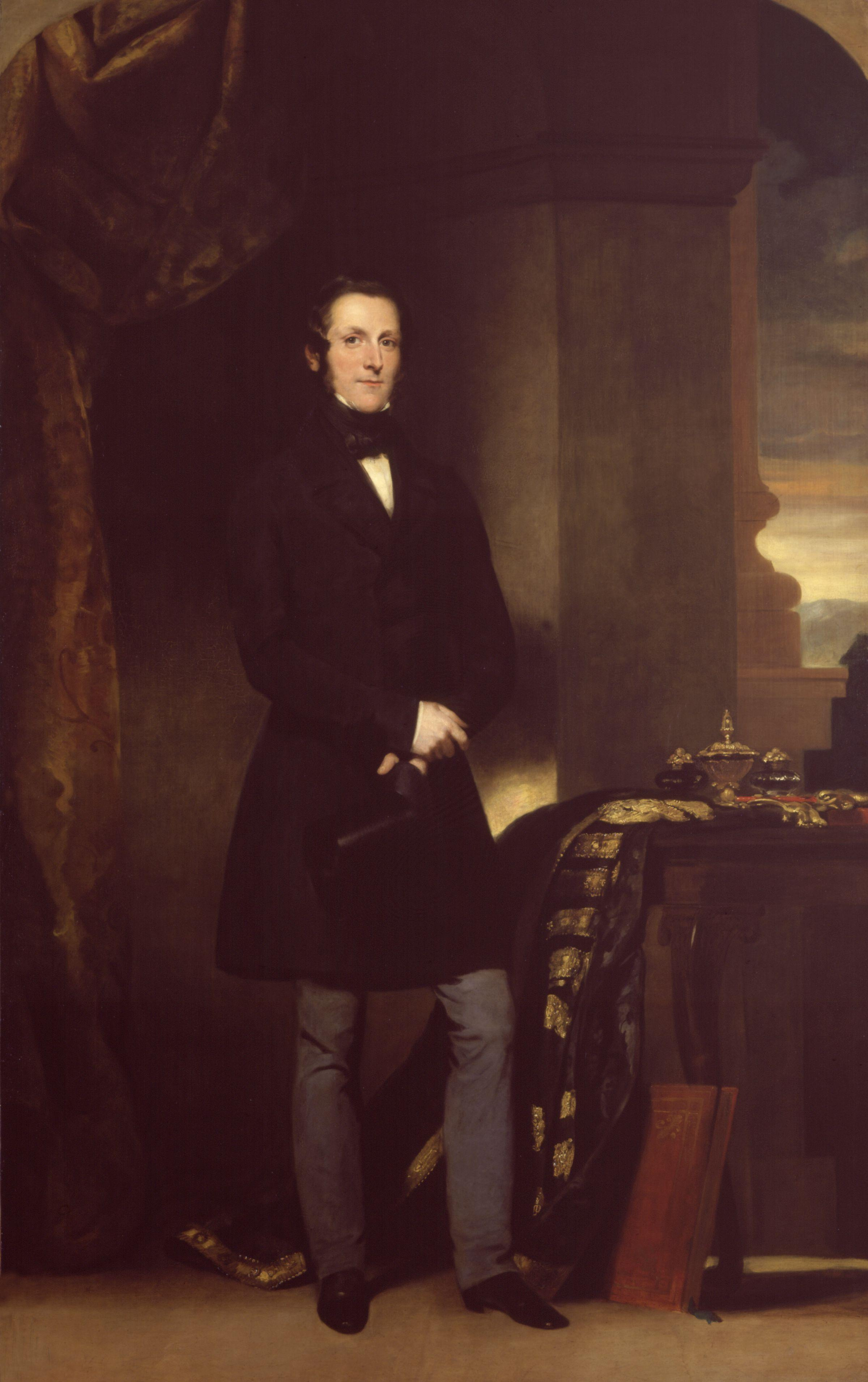
James Broun-Ramsay, 1st Marquess of Dalhousie, 1847
