= John Thomson Gordon =

Scottish advocate

John Thomson Gordon FRSE (1813-1865) was a Scottish advocate who served as Rector of Marischal College 1849-50 and Sheriff of Aberdeen 1847-48 and Edinburgh 1848–1865.

== Life ==
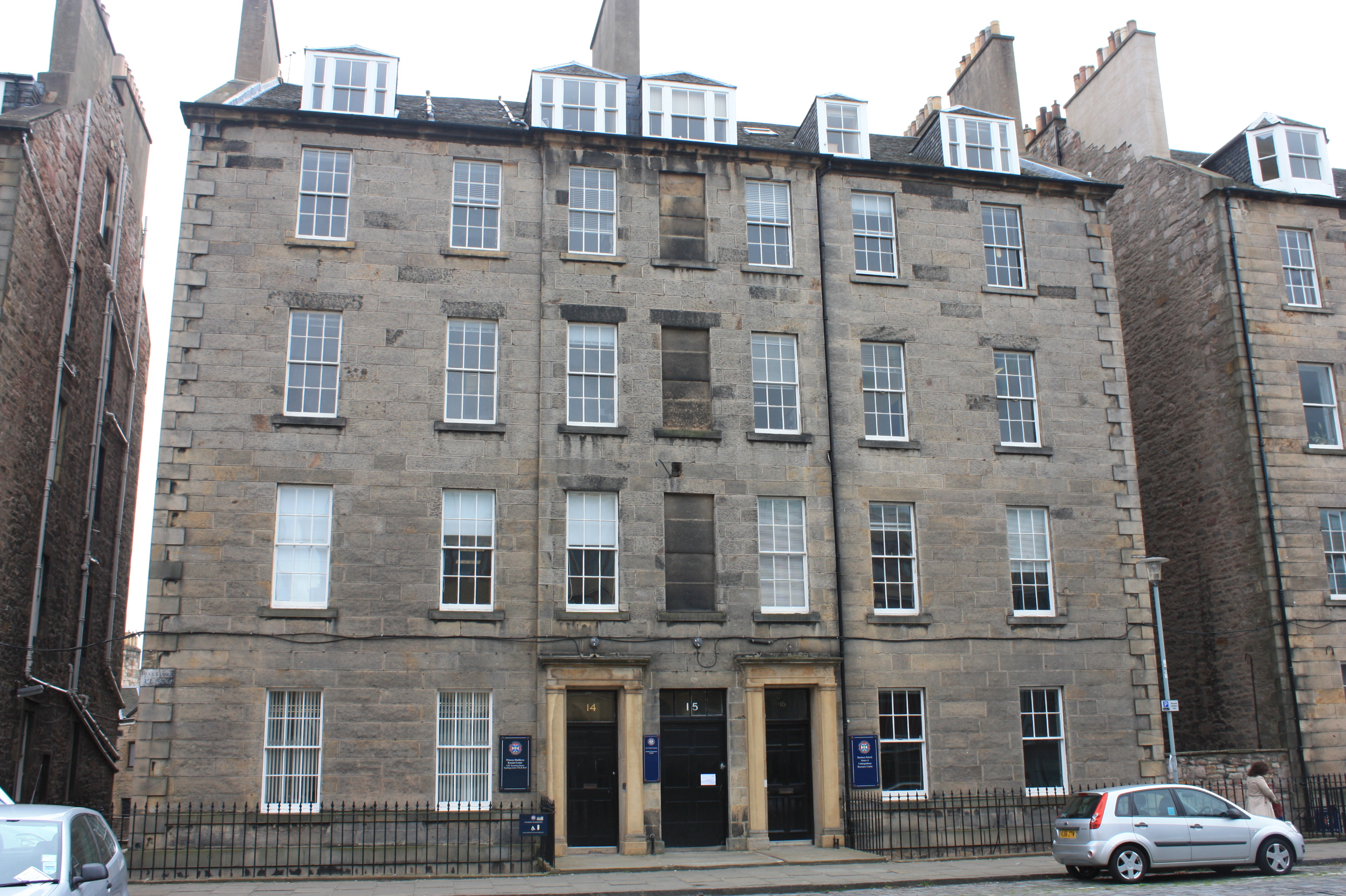
Gordon was born at 14 Buccleuch Place, Edinburgh: the ground floor and basement property to the left hand side of the picture

He was born on 19 March 1813 at 14 Buccleuch Place in Edinburgh the son of Dr John Gordon. His mother was the sister of Andrew Rutherfurd, Lord Rutherfurd. The family moved to 19 Castle Street in the New Town when he was five.

He was educated at Edinburgh Academy then studied law at the University of Edinburgh. He became an advocate in 1835. He was Sheriff of Aberdeen in 1847-48.

In 1849 he was elected a Fellow of the Royal Society of Edinburgh. His proposer was John Gordon of Cairnbulg.

From 1848 he became Sheriff of Edinburgh based at Midlothian Chambers in Edinburgh.

He died in Caen in northern France on 21 September 1865.

== Family ==
In 1837 he married Mary Wilson (d.1873), daughter of John Wilson. Her sister, Jane Emily Wilson, was married to William Edmondstoune Aytoun.
