= Johann Spurzheim =

German physician and phrenologist (1776–1832)

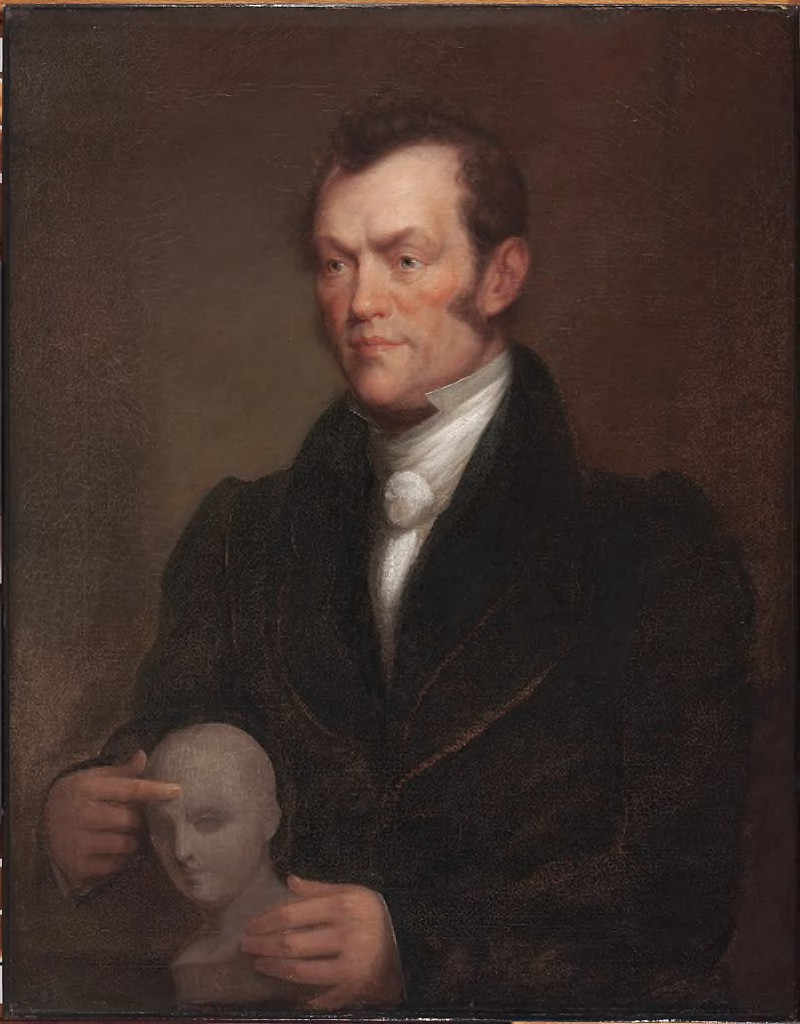
- Johann Spurzheim by Alvan Fisher
- Born: 31 December 1776; Trier, Electorate of Trier, Germany
- Died: 10 November 1832 (aged 55); Boston, Massachusetts, United States
- Scientific career
- Fields: Phrenology

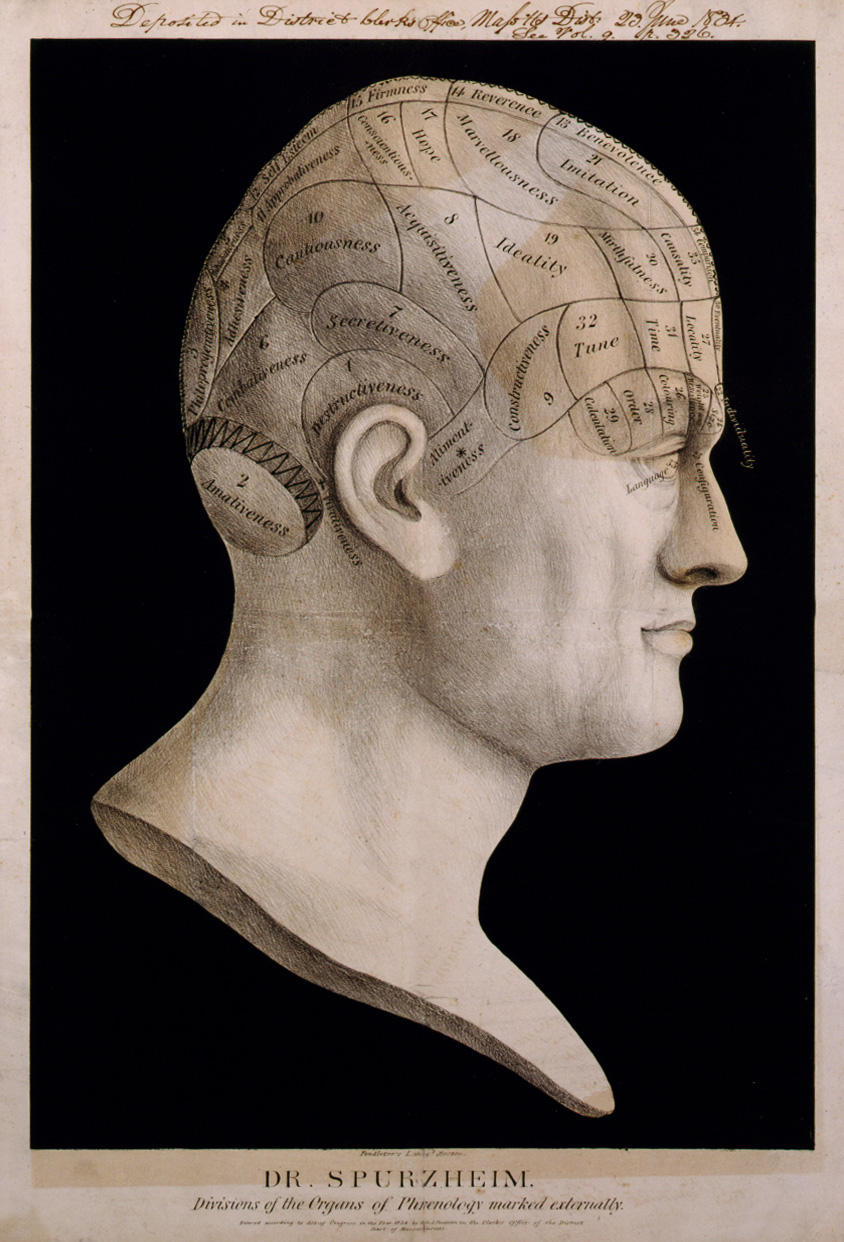
Phrenology chart attributed to Dr. Spurzheim. Lithograph submitted to the Library of Congress by Pendleton's Lithography, 1834.

Johann Gaspar Spurzheim (31 December 1776 – 10 November 1832) was a German medical doctor who became one of the chief proponents of phrenology, which was developed c. 1800 by Franz Joseph Gall (1758–1828).

== Biography ==
Spurzheim was born near Trier, Germany, on 31 December 1776 and studied medicine at the University of Vienna. He became acquainted with Gall in 1800 and was soon hired by him as an assistant. Gall intended to have Spurzheim as his successor and added his name as a co-author to books and publications. In 1812, however, Gall and Spurzheim had a falling out, and Spurzheim started a separate career, lecturing and writing extensively on what he termed 'The Physiognomical System of Drs Gall and Spurzheim'. He greatly popularised phrenology, and travelled extensively throughout Europe, achieving considerable success in England and France.

In 1816 he travelled to Edinburgh to refute an article by Dr John Gordon who had famously debunked Spurzheim, Gall and phrenology in general in an article in the Edinburgh Review in 1815.

He died of typhoid in Boston in 1832, cutting short his first and only American tour. After the public autopsy of Spurzheim, his brain, skull, and heart were removed, preserved in jars of alcohol as relics, and put on display to the public. Adoring Bostonians staged an elaborate public funeral and erected a monument in Mount Auburn Cemetery in Cambridge, Massachusetts.

Spurzheim made many alterations to Gall's phrenological system, including an increase in the number of "organs", as well as its organization into a hierarchical system. Spurzheim also used images and busts to illustrate the craniographic approach of phrenology.

== Publications ==
- Philosophical Catechism of the Natural Laws of Man (1833)
