= Andrew Rutherfurd, Lord Rutherfurd =

British politician; (1791–1854)

The Right Honourable Lord Rutherfurd PC FRSE
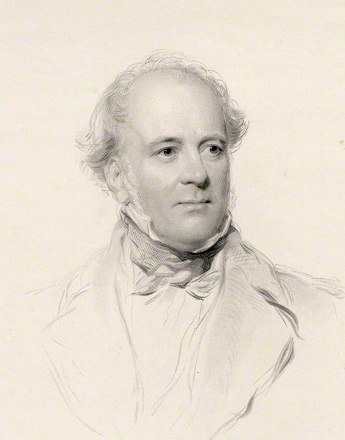
- Lord Rutherfurd, c. 1852

Member of Parliament for Leith Burghs
- In office 1839–1851
- Preceded by: John Archibald Murray
- Succeeded by: James Moncreiff

Lord Advocate
- In office 1846–1851
- Preceded by: Duncan McNeill
- Succeeded by: James Moncreiff
- In office 1839–1841
- Preceded by: John Murray
- Succeeded by: Sir William Rae

Solicitor General for Scotland
- In office 1837–1839
- Preceded by: John Cunninghame
- Succeeded by: James Ivory

Personal details
- Born: Andrew Greenfield; 21 June 1791 Bristo Port, Scotland
- Died: 13 December 1854 (aged 63)
- Spouse: Sophia Frances Stewart (m. 1822; died 1852)
- Relations: John Thomson Gordon (nephew)
- Parent(s): William Greenfield; Janet Rutherfurd Bervie
- Education: Royal High School, Edinburgh
- Alma mater: University of Edinburgh

Andrew Rutherfurd, Lord Rutherfurd, PC, FRSE (born Andrew Greenfield; 21 June 1791 – 13 December 1854) was a Scottish advocate, judge and politician.

== Early life ==
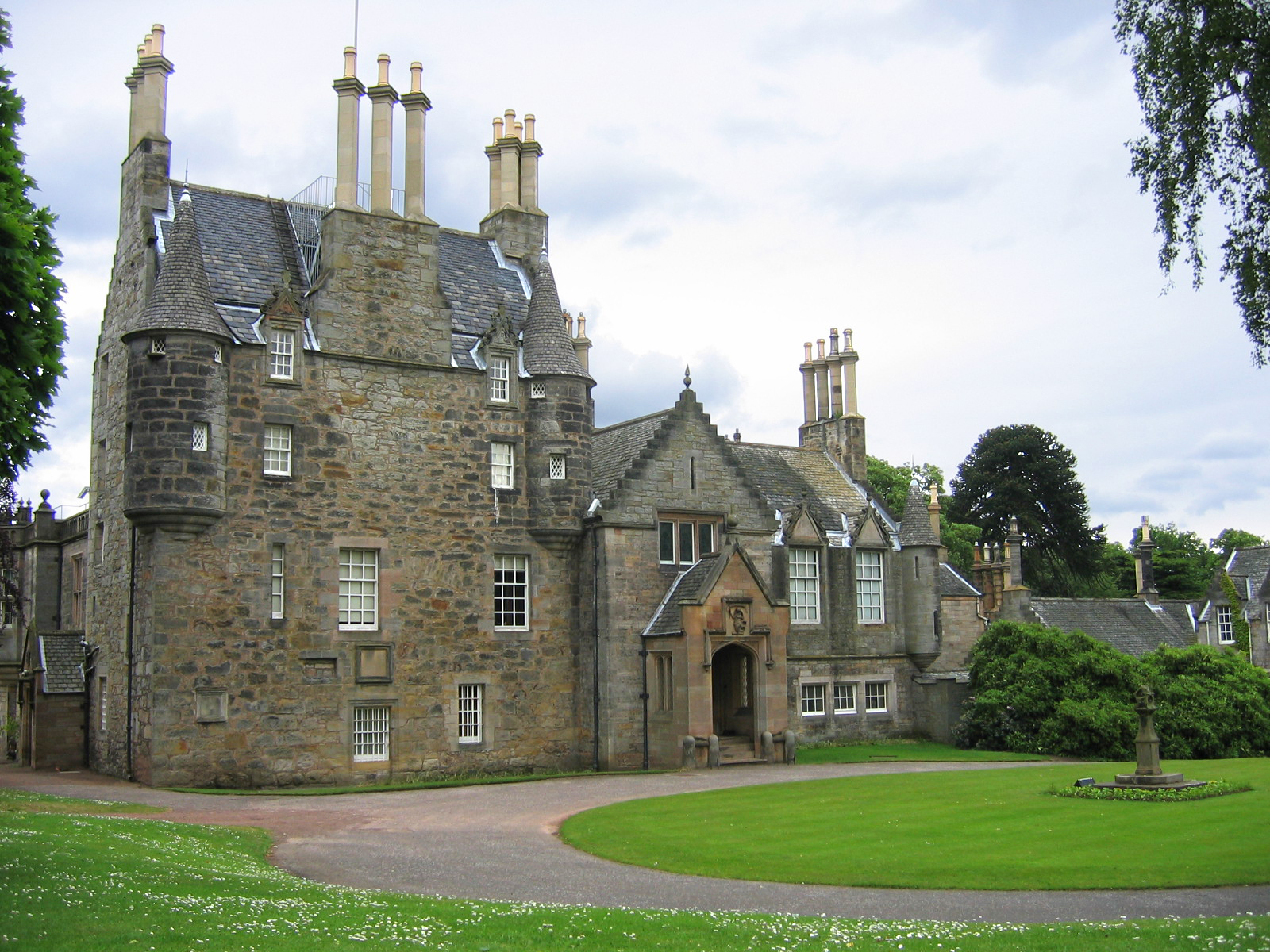
Lauriston Castle

Rutherfurd was born at Bristo Port (near Greyfriars Kirkyard) in Edinburgh on 21 June 1791 to Janet Rutherfurd Bervie, and Reverend William Greenfield. In 1799, after his father was disgraced in a sex scandal, the family changed their name to Rutherfurd, his maternal grandmother's maiden name. His main house was Lauriston Castle near Cramond just north-west of the city. His sister married John Gordon FRSE, father of John Thomson Gordon FRSE.

He was educated at the High School in Edinburgh's Old Town, then studied law at the University of Edinburgh. He became an advocate in 1812.

== Career ==
In the 1830s, he was listed as an advocate living at 9, St Colme Street, on the Moray Estate in Edinburgh's west end. His house was remodelled by William Notman in 1835, whilst working in the offices of William Henry Playfair.

He was appointed Solicitor General for Scotland from 1837, becoming Lord Advocate in 1839 and Member of Parliament for Leith burghs in the same year. He was appointed Lord Advocate of Scotland in 1839, passing bills including removal of the restriction of the printing of Bibles to license holders only, and Bibles could be printed without restriction for the first time. He resigned office as MP in September 1841 on Robert Peel's accession to power.

He was appointed Rector of the University of Glasgow in December 1844, adopting the role from January 1845.

He played an active part in parliamentary proceedings relating to Scotland, and proposed the repeal of the Corn Laws in 1846. He was reappointed Lord Advocate in 1846, and was responsible for legislation and amending the law of entail in Scotland in 1848. He served on the Royal Commission on the British Museum (1847–49).

On 2 January 1849 he was elected a Fellow of the Royal Society of Edinburgh, his proposer being John Russell.

He was appointed a Senator of the College of Justice in place of Lord Moncreiff, as Lord Rutherfurd and a Privy Counsellor in May 1851. From 1851 to 1854 he was a Lord of Session.

== Personal life ==
In 1822, Rutherfurd married Sophia Frances Stewart, one of three daughters and two sons born to Mary Susanna (née Whaley) Stewart (a daughter of Richard Chapell Whaley, MP of Whaley Abbey) and Sir James Stewart, 7th Baronet, MP for County Donegal. They had no children.

His wife died in 1852 and was buried in Dean Cemetery under a spectacular red granite pyramid. Lord Rutherfurd died on 13 December 1854 at 9 St Colme Street, his Edinburgh townhouse. He is buried with his wife at Dean Cemetery in western Edinburgh.

He had no children and his estates passed to a nephew Andrew Clark, who conditionally changed his name to Andrew Rutherfurd-Clark.

== Legacy ==
At Dean Cemetery, he was buried on Lord's Row, against the western wall, beneath a red granite pyramid designed by William Henry Playfair and built by Stewart McGlashan. The monument is inscribed: Uxori desideratissimae contra votum superstes moerens posuit Andreas Rutherfurd, et sibi, MDCCCLII. ("Andrew Rutherfurd, surviving against his will, placed this tomb in mourning to his most beloved wife, and to himself, 1852".)

== Artistic recognition ==
A full-length portrait by John Watson Gordon was commissioned by Leith Town Council and hung in the Leith Chambers on Queen Charlotte Street.

== Galley ==
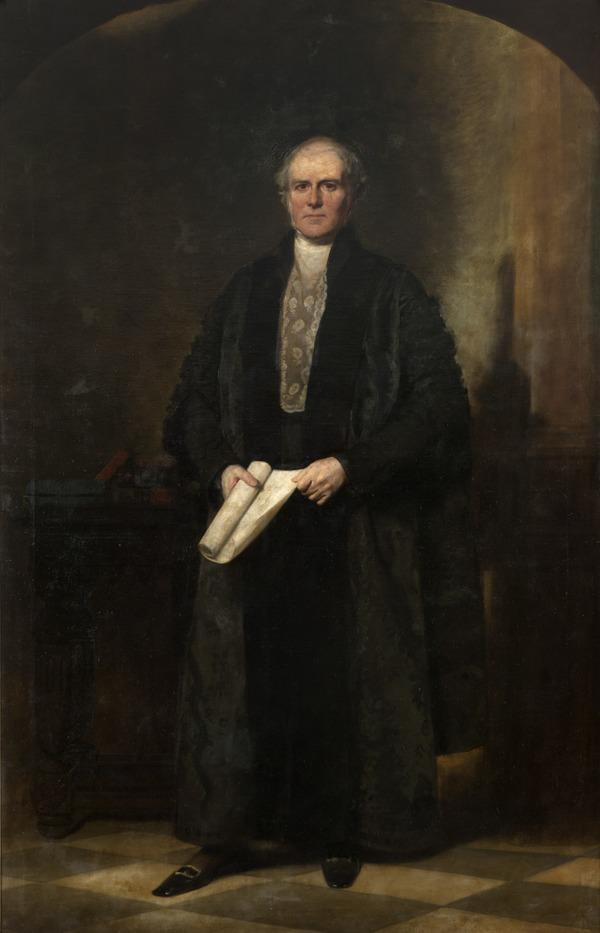
Portrait of Lord Rutherfurd, by Sir John Watson Gordon, c. 1851

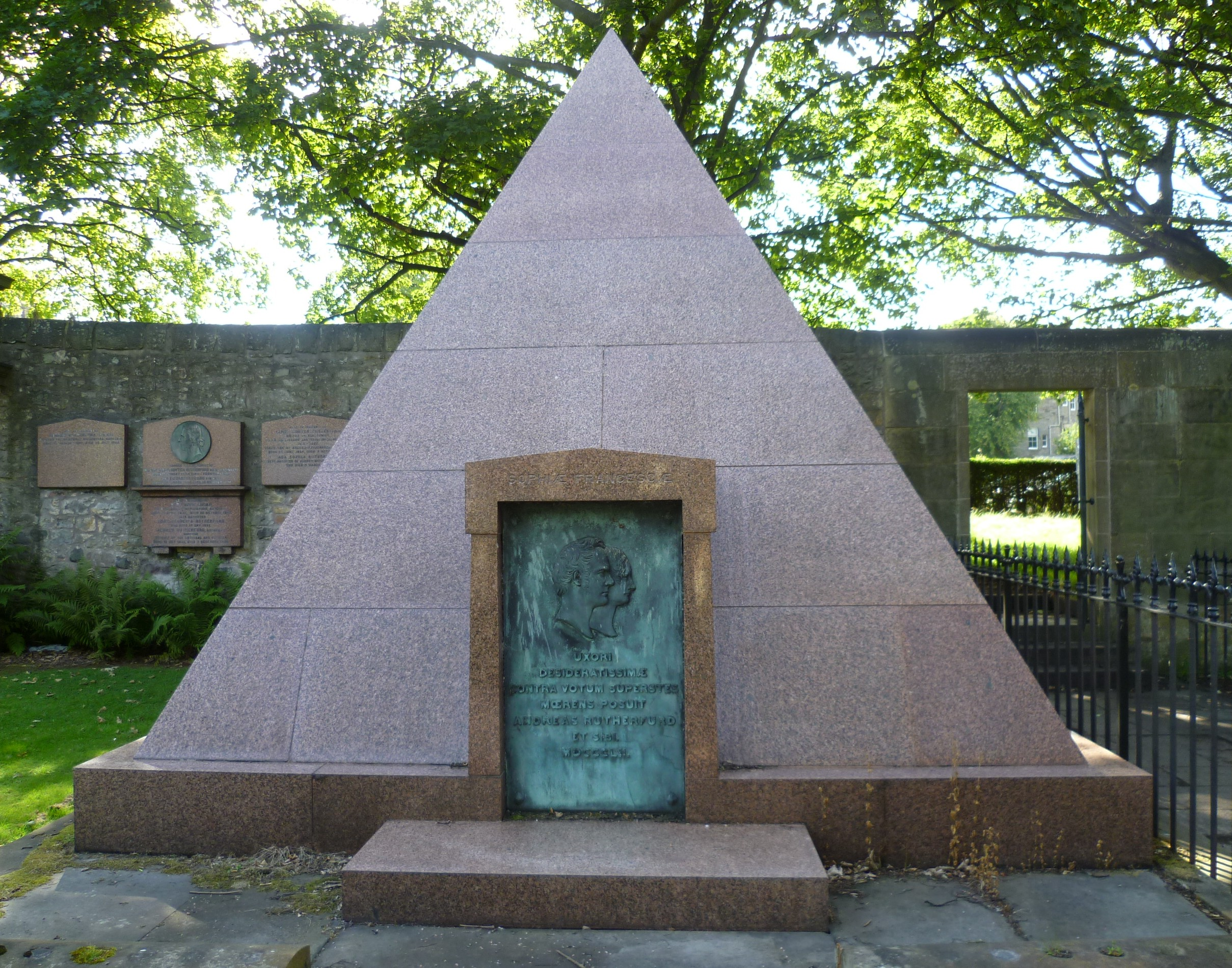
Grave in the Dean Cemetery

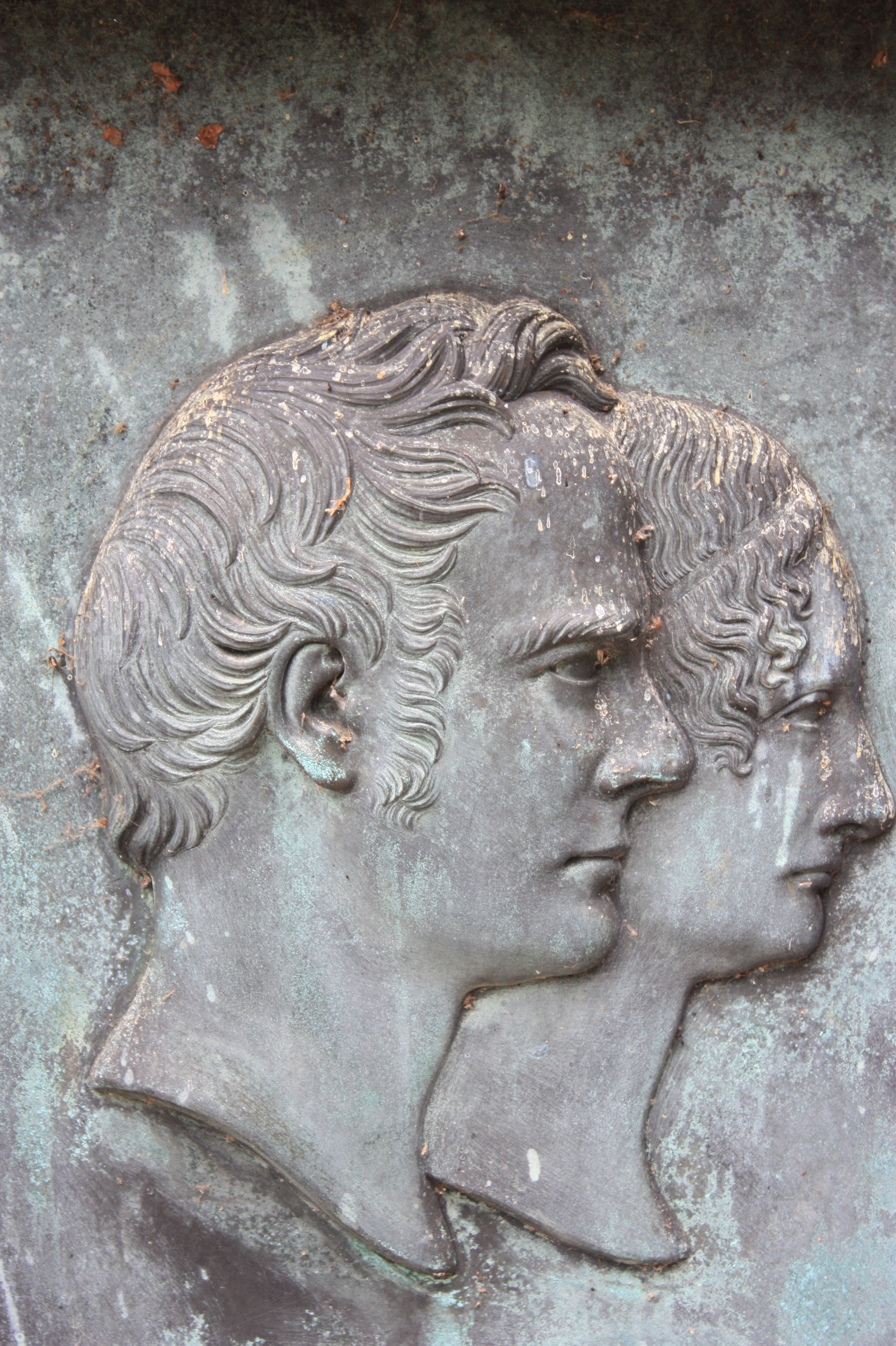
Andrew Rutherfurd and his wife, Sophia

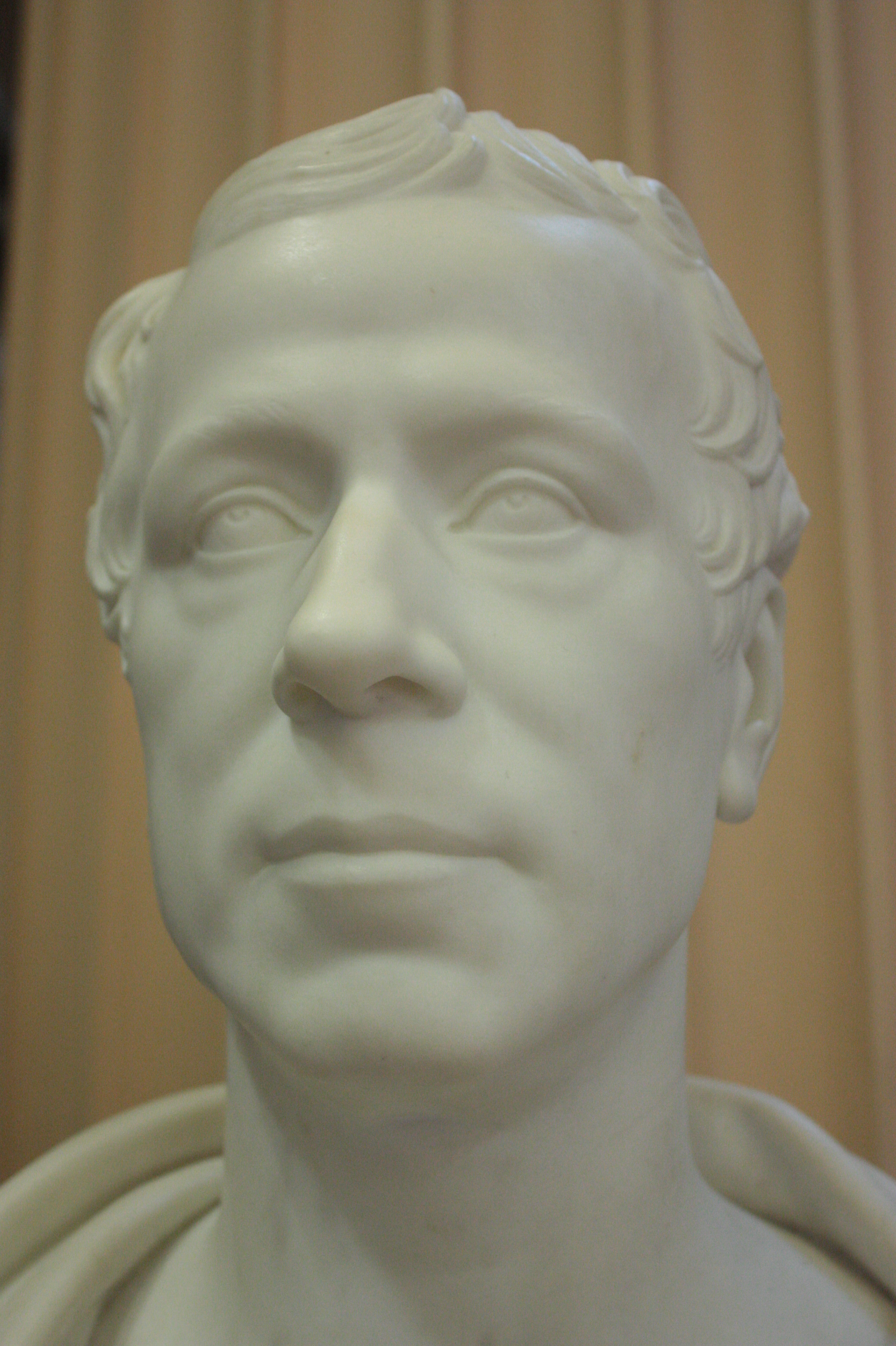
Bust of Rutherfurd, by William Theod Rome (1837) Old College, University of Edinburgh

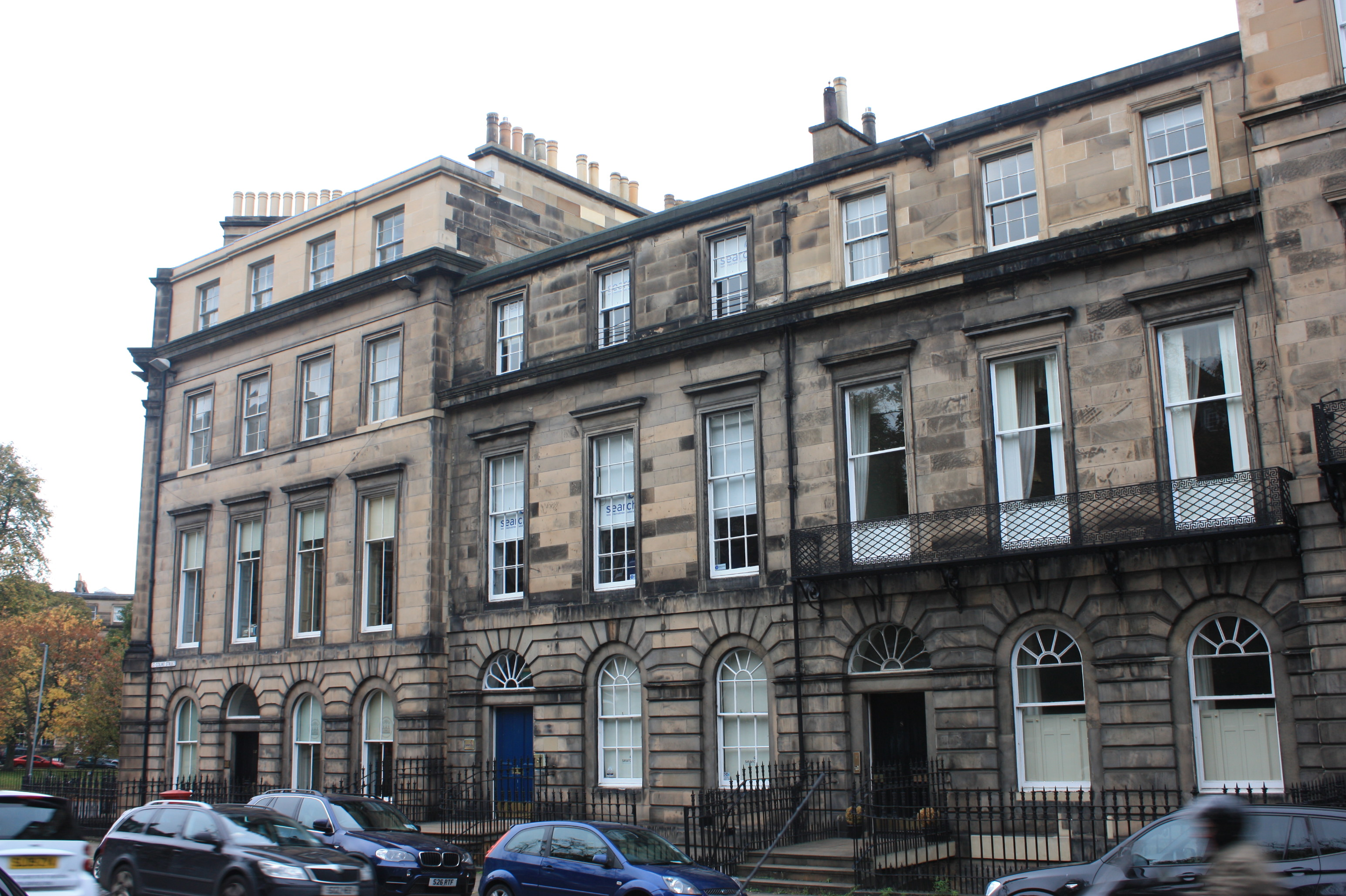
Rutherfurd's home at 9 St Colme Street, Edinburgh (centre: blue door)

Parliament of the United Kingdom
Preceded by John Archibald Murray	Member of Parliament for Leith Burghs; 1839–1851	Succeeded by James Moncreiff
Legal offices
Preceded by John Cunninghame	Solicitor General for Scotland; 1837–1839	Succeeded by James Ivory
Preceded by John Murray	Lord Advocate; 1839–1841	Succeeded by Sir William Rae
Preceded by Duncan McNeill	Lord Advocate; 1846–1851	Succeeded by James Moncreiff
