= Royal Commission on the British Museum =

British government commission

The Royal Commission on the British Museum (RCBM) was set up to review the activities of the British Museum particularly in relation to its Library.

The commission was set up following an approach made by a number of eminent scientists to Lord John Russell, the prime minister sent on 10 March 1847. In June 1847 the original commission was set up with eleven members and a quorum of five. Having met three times by the end of the year, it was found that the revolutionary events on the continent of Europe provided a distraction, and the commission failed to meet its quorum on occasions. On 5 May 1848 the commission was re-established with fourteen members and a quorum of three.

== Composition ==
The commission was headed by Lord Ellesmere. Other active members included Lord Seymour, Lord Canning, Roderick Murchison, Lord Rutherfurd. John Payne Collier acted as secretary (which was before his activities as forger had come to light).

== British Museum Library Catalogue ==
A major part of the RCBM was concerned with the British Museum Library Catalogue.
