= John Payne Collier =

English writer and scholar (1789–1883)

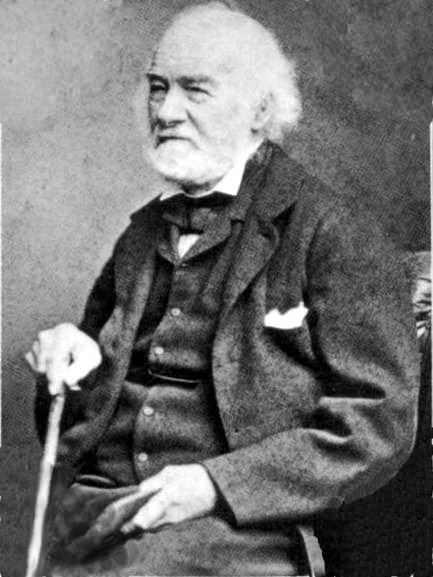
- Portrait of John Payne Collier, 1880
- Born: 11 January 1789; London, England
- Died: 17 September 1883 (aged 94); Maidenhead, England
- Occupations: Writer; scholar
- Known for: controversial Shakespearean scholar

John Payne Collier (11 January 1789 – 17 September 1883) was an English writer and scholar. He was well known for publishing many books on Shakespeare. However, his reputation has declined as a result of the Perkins Folio forgery.

== Reporter and barrister ==
His father, John Dyer Collier (1762–1825), was a successful journalist, and his connection with the press obtained for his son a position on The Morning Chronicle as leader writer, dramatic critic and reporter, which continued until 1847; he was also for some time a reporter for The Times. He was summoned before the House of Commons in 1819 for giving an incorrect report of a speech by Joseph Hume. He entered the Middle Temple in 1811, but was not called to the bar until 1829. The delay was partly due to his indiscretion in publishing the Criticisms on the Bar (1819) by "Amicus Curiae".

== Controversial Shakespearean scholar ==
Collier's leisure was given to the study of Shakespeare and the early English drama. After some minor publications, he produced in 1825–1827 a new edition of Dodsley's Old Plays and in 1833 a supplementary volume entitled Five Old Plays. In 1831 appeared his 3-volume History of English Dramatic Poetry to the Time of Shakespeare and Annals of the Stage to the Restoration, a badly arranged but valuable work. It obtained for him the post of librarian to the 6th Duke of Devonshire, and, subsequently, access to the chief collections of early English literature throughout the kingdom, especially to the treasures of Lord Ellesmere at Bridgewater House. Other publications included a script in 1828 under the title The Tragical Comedy or Comical Tragedy of Punch and Judy.

He produced the Memoirs of Edward Alleyn for the Shakespeare Society in 1841. He followed up this volume with the Alleyn Papers (1843) and the Diary of Philip Henslowe (1845). Collier used these opportunities to commence a series of literary fabrications, as the debates of the following decades revealed. His 8-volume edition of the Works of Shakespeare began to appear in 1842. His edition attracted criticism from his long-time friend, the literary historian Revd. Alexander Dyce, who nonetheless also found much to commend in it, including Collier's biographical essay. In 1847 he was appointed secretary to the Royal Commission on the British Museum.

=== The Perkins Folio ===
Over the next several years he claimed to find a number of new documents relating to Shakespeare's life and business. After New Facts, New Particulars and Further Particulars respecting Shakespeare had appeared and passed muster, Collier produced (1852) the famous Perkins Folio, a copy of the Second Folio (1632), so called from a name written on the title-page. In this book were numerous manuscript emendations of Shakespeare, said by Collier to be from the hand of an "old corrector". He published these alterations as Notes and Emendations to the Text of Shakespeare (1853) as a supplementary volume to his edition of Shakespeare's works, bringing out a revised edition of this volume within months of the first. At the same time he published an edition of the plays in a single volume (the "Monovolume" edition), incorporating the Perkins Folio amendments without any detailed commentary.

=== Unfavourable reception ===
Collier's friend Dyce was among the first to reject many of the alterations by the "Old Corrector" as "ignorant, tasteless and wanton", while recognizing that others required no more authority than common sense to be accepted as correct, many having been proposed already by other scholars. The authenticity of the whole, however, was roundly rejected, on internal evidence, by S. W. Singer in The Text of Shakespeare Vindicated (1853). In 1853 J.O. Halliwell showed the Dulwich letter to have been (at best) misinterpreted by Collier, and stated (with the owner's permission) his misgivings that Lord Ellesmere's Shakespearean manuscripts were all modern forgeries.

In 1855, in Notes and Queries, Volume X, Collier reported a new "find" in the re-discovery of his own shorthand notes from lectures given by Samuel Taylor Coleridge in 1811 or 1812, which he published as a volume in 1856 together with a list of the emendations in the Perkins Folio. In a public letter soon extended into a short tract of 1855, A.E. Brae (anonymously) brought evidence challenging the authenticity of Collier's lecture notes, and in effect accusing Collier of having perpetrated the Shakespeare alterations as a fraud. In response to these challenges, in January 1856 Collier made a legal affidavit swearing to the truth of his statements regarding the Coleridge lectures and the Perkins folio, and sought to move the Court of Queen's Bench for a criminal action for libel against the publisher John Russell Smith. While Lord Campbell, presiding, refused to proceed, he commended the character of the applicant and pronounced him to be vindicated by his affidavit, and afterwards gave Collier other tokens of his friendship and esteem.

=== Controversy and exposure ===
Collier's second edition of the Works of Shakespeare appeared in 6 volumes in 1858, and bore both in its Preface and in the notes to the text a scathing attack on (among others) Alexander Dyce, accusing him of selective appropriation of Collier's emendations without acknowledgement, motivated by an intention to disparage. Their friendship irrecoverably broken, Dyce responded in a full volume by rejecting Collier's charges against him as artful and deliberate misrepresentations.

In 1853 Collier had made a gift of the Perkins Folio to his patron, the 6th Duke of Devonshire, who remained supportive towards him but died in 1858. In 1859, his cousin and successor the 7th Duke submitted the Folio to the scrutiny of Sir Frederic Madden, Keeper of Manuscripts at the British Museum, and Nicholas Hamilton, of that department, who pronounced that the emendations were incontestably forgeries of modern date. These findings were further confirmed by a microscopic physical analysis by N.S. Maskelyne, Keeper of the Mineral Department, showing that the supposed archaic handwriting of the emendations was made using not ink but a sepia paint, which overlay erased pencil annotations in modern handwriting closely resembling that of John Payne Collier. The facts were presented by C.M. Ingleby in collected form in 1859, with a full-page dedication naming Andrew Edmund Brae as the first to protest against the specious readings of the Perkins Folio, and, by the use of philological methods, the first to prove that they were modern fabrications.

Ingleby showed that the annotations incorporated ideas drawn from very recent scholarship, knowledge or usage. Hamilton's findings were more fully expressed in his Inquiry (1860). A.E. Brae, now in his own name, reviewed the matter more at length in 1860, and Ingleby gave a fuller account of the discussion raised by Collier's emendations in his Complete View of the Shakespeare Controversy (1861).

=== Legacy ===
During the later 18th century, literary forgeries had a certain esteem, when audacious impostures like the De Situ Britanniae, the pseudo-Ossian, the medieval poems of Thomas Chatterton, or the works of William Henry Ireland might carry their own worth, and capture the romantic imagination. The case of Collier, in the mid-19th century, was different, because it was profoundly shocking to the scholarly establishment to discover that a long-established colleague in their midst, a person closely associated with the British Museum, the editor of numerous important editions, with privileged access to the primary documents of English literature, should become suspected of the systematic falsification of evidence and possibly the mutilation of original materials, especially in relation to William Shakespeare. Much as Sir Edward Dering's forgeries had corrupted the historical record in ways that were then not yet recognized, such a presence placed a question-mark over the authenticity of the whole resource, and over the work of other scholars whom he might have misled.

It became clear during the 1850s to most of his critics, that Collier was himself the deceiver, not the deceived. Since then, the falsifications of which he was unquestionably guilty among the manuscripts at Dulwich College have left little doubt of it. He interpolated the name of Shakespeare in a genuine letter at Dulwich, and the spurious entries in Alleyn's Diary were proved to be by Collier's hand when the sale of his library in 1884 gave access to a transcript he had made of the Diary with interlineations corresponding with the Dulwich forgeries. No statement of his can be accepted without verification, nor any manuscript handled by him, without careful examination, but he did much useful work. He compiled a valuable Bibliographical and Critical Account of the Rarest Books in the English Language (1865); he reprinted a great number of early English tracts of extreme rarity and rendered good service to the numerous antiquarian societies with which he was connected, especially in the editions he produced for the Camden Society and the Percy Society.

His Old Man's Diary (1871–72) is an interesting record, though even here the taint of fabrication is not absent. Unfortunately, what he did amiss is more striking to the imagination than what he did aright, and he will be chiefly remembered by it. He died at Maidenhead, where he had long resided, on 17 September 1883.

== Modern views ==
An attempt to redeem Collier's reputation from the charge of forgery was made by Dewey Ganzel in his 1982 study Fortune and Men's Eyes. He argued that Collier's accusers, led by Frederic Madden, were motivated largely by envy and class bias, and that they were upper-class dilettantes determined to put down a lower-class but ferociously hard-working and talented striver. Some of the accusations against Collier, such as the claim by American psychiatrist Samuel A. Tannenbaum that Collier had forged all the accounts of the Master of the Revels, do not stand up to critical examination.

Scholarly opinion, however, still convicts Collier of the forgeries. Samuel Schoenbaum pointed out that in 1875, many years after the Perkins Folio affair, Collier claimed to possess a John Milton folio "full of Milton's brief notes and references; 1500 of them." By that time his reputation was so tarnished that a fresh campaign was impossible. His "Milton" folio is preserved in the New York Public Library, but the annotations are not by Milton. Schoenbaum also referred to entries in Collier's diary in which, late in life, he expressed an unspecified remorse. On 19 February 1881 he wrote, "I have done many base things in my time—some that I knew to be base at the moment, and many that I deeply regretted afterwards and up to this very day": and on 14 May 1882 he wrote, "I am bitterly sad and most sincerely grieved that in every way I am such a despicable offender[.] I am ashamed of almost every act of my life... My repentance is bitter and sincere[.]" Frank Kermode observed that Collier's "repentance would have been more useful if he had identified his fabrications and forgeries."

A more recent study in two volumes by Arthur Freeman and Janet Ing Freeman, after re-examining the evidence, again concluded that Collier was a forger. Dewey Ganzel responded to this study,

"He [Arthur Freeman] assumes Collier's guilt and that leads to looking at Collier's work with the expectation of finding fraud... my study revealed what was the irrefutable evidence that he was a victim of a conspiracy of which Frederick Madden was a part... Freeman starts with a criminal; I tried to end up with a man. Freeman says that in 'suspending judgement' of Collier's guilt 'one forfeits the opportunity to explain him at all.' That confusion leads to only one kind of explanation of the events he describes, and, for me, not a very satisfactory one. The point is, the crimes are not 'unproven'; the perpetrators are."

Ganzel suggested that Collier's so-called "confession" may have referred to non-acceptance of certain Christian beliefs. Richard J. Westall, Collier's great-great-grandson, published a note which Collier dictated to his daughter shortly before his death: "I have written much in verse and prose, but can confidently say that I never produced a line, either in verse or prose that was calculated to be injurious either to morality or religion". Westall also referred to Arthur Freeman's comment in a letter to Westall, that "we never presume JPC guilty until the evidence is sifted": Westall remarks that this "hardly squares with the disparagement made in their [the Freemans'] biography of those who 'high-mindedly' suspend judgement", by which they state that such an approach "forfeits the opportunity to explain him at all".
