= James Penny =

English merchant and slave trader

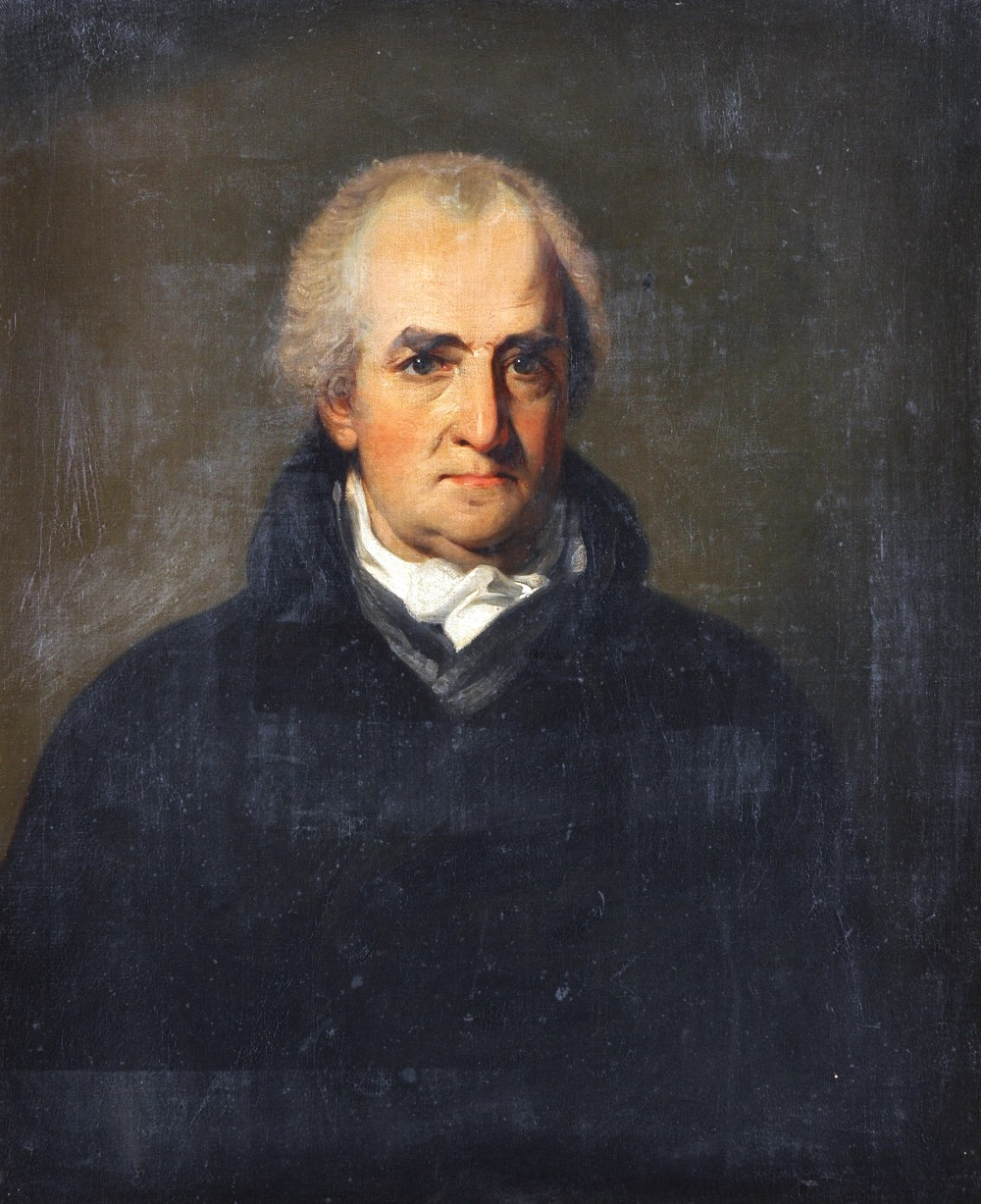
Portrait of James Penny by Thomas Hargreaves

James Penny (died 1799) was an English merchant and slave trader who was a prominent defender of the Liverpool slave trade. The famous Penny Lane street in Liverpool has been associated with him, although it is now widely regarded as of an unconnected origin.

== Early life ==
Penny was probably not a native of Liverpool and may have been born in Ulverston, Lancashire. He came to Liverpool to work as a mariner and was married to Ann Cooper in 1768. He is subsequently referred to as a mariner, ship's captain and merchant in Liverpool directories.

Penny was active in the Atlantic slave trade until the American Revolutionary War. He returned to the trade after the war as a shipowner and as a business partner with other traders. He was involved in several slave trading companies and was known for his knowledge of the African coast derived from his many journeys dating back to 1776.

When in 1788, the British government launched an inquiry into the slave trade, following public pressure from abolitionists, Penny was chosen to represent the views of slavers. According to local historian F.E. Sanderson, he was a "man of considerable stature in the town, highly regarded by his fellow merchants, his forthright views on the slave trade must have brought him to their notice as a likely delegate".

== Evidence to Parliament ==
In the possible evidence he gave the British Government, Penny claimed that "he found himself impelled, both by humanity and interest, to pay every possible attention both to the preservation of the crew and the slaves." He stated that he allowed the slaves on the Atlantic slave route to play games and dance and sing.

If the Weather is sultry, and there appears the least Perspiration upon their Skins, when they come upon Deck, there are Two Men attending with Cloths to rub them perfectly dry, and another to give them a little Cordial.... They are then supplied with Pipes and Tobacco.... They are amused with Instruments of Music peculiar to their own country...and when tired of Music and Dancing, they then go to Games of Chance.

In the same body of evidence, he notes that the fatality rate for his slaves was one in twelve, and that "The average allowance of width to a slave is fourteen and two-thirds inches." Penny also argued that abolition of the trade would destroy the economy of Liverpool; "it would not only greatly affect the commercial interest, but also the landed property of the County of Lancaster and more particularly, the Town of Liverpool; whose fall, in that case, would be as rapid as its rise has been astonishing."

== Later life ==
In 1792, he was presented with a silver epergne for speaking in favour of the slave trade to a parliamentary committee. He continued to be committed to the slave trade even when other merchants were moving away from it. With his eldest son, James, he was elected to the African Company of Merchants trading in Liverpool in July 1793. He died in 1799.

One of Penny's daughters married the writer Christopher North.
