= John Murray, Lord Murray =

Scottish judge

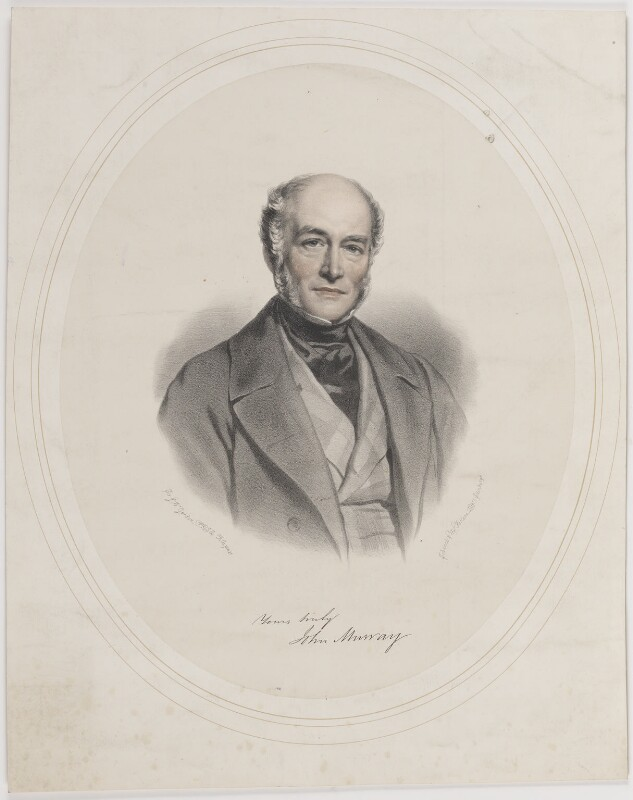
John Murray, Lord Murray, portrait c.1854

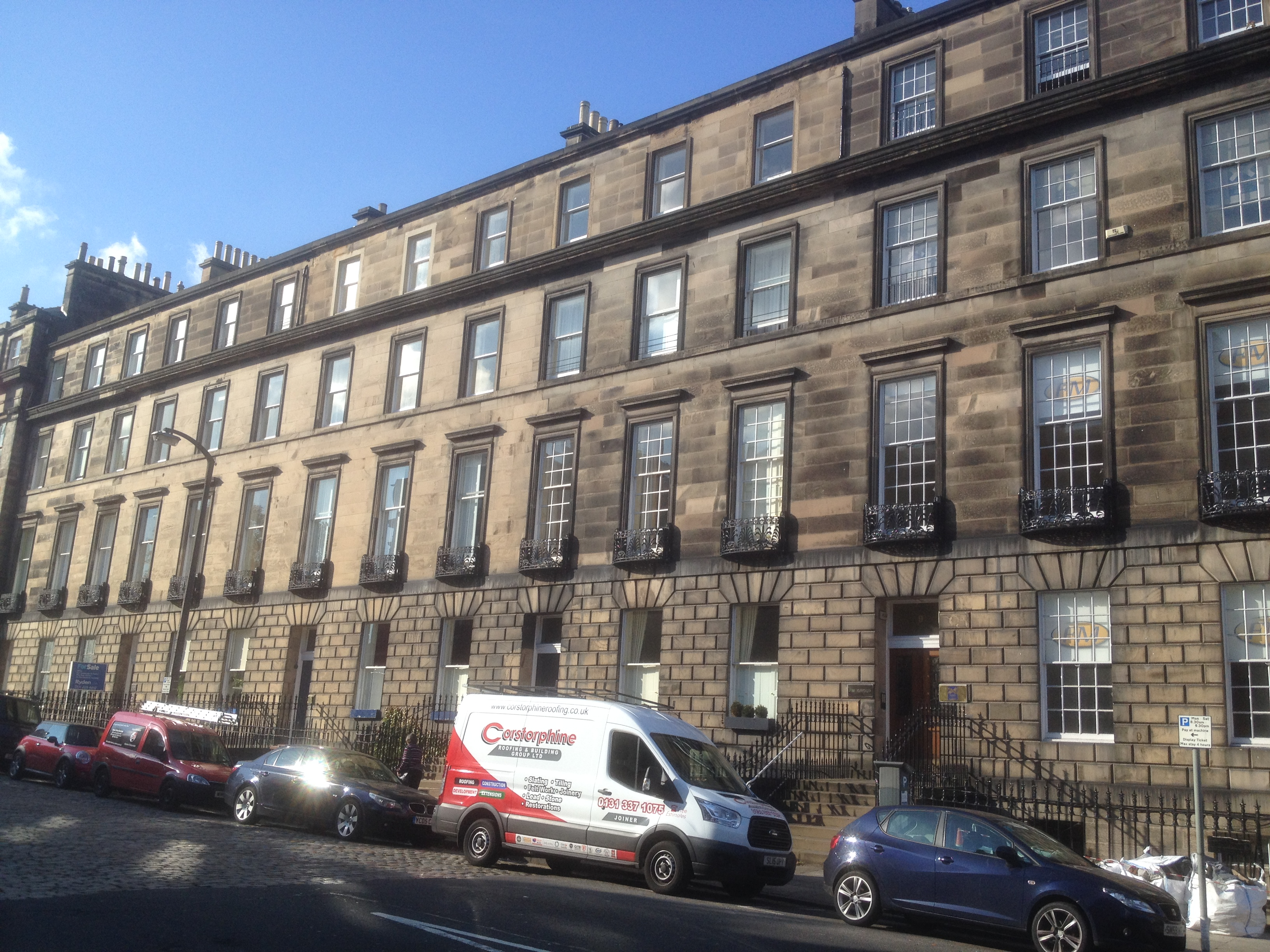
Great Stuart Street, Edinburgh

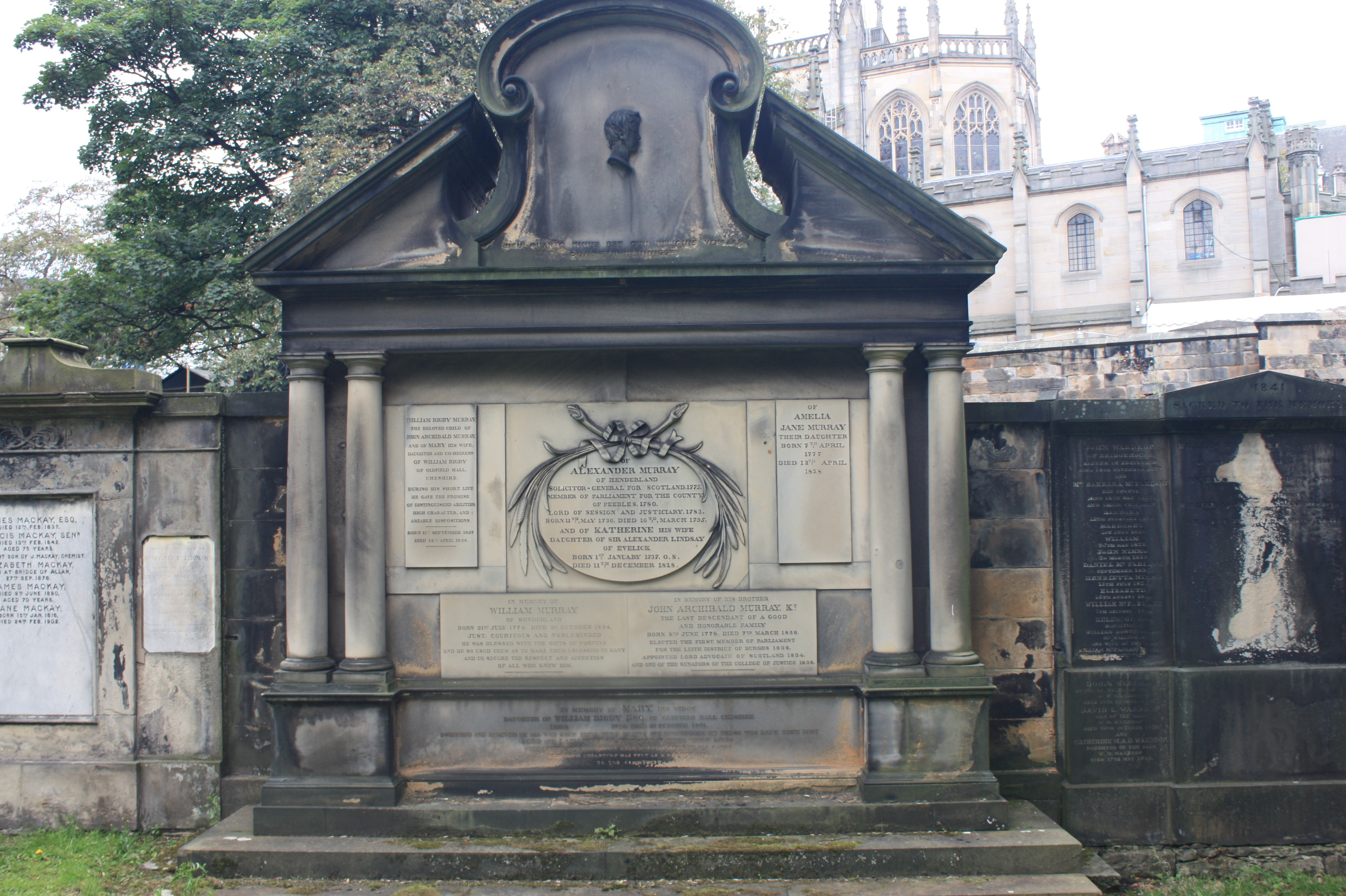
The Murray monument to, St Cuthberts, Edinburgh

Sir John Archibald Murray of Henderland, Lord Murray (1778–1859) was a Scottish judge and Senator of the College of Justice.

== Life ==
He was born in Midlothian on 8 June 1778, the second son of Alexander Murray, Lord Henderland, Lord of Session and Justiciary. His mother was Katherine Lindsay, daughter of Sir Alexander Lindsay of Evelick, Perthshire, and a niece of the first Lord Mansfield. His brother was William Murray of Henderland FRSE.

Murray was educated successively at the Edinburgh High School, at Westminster School, and at the University of Edinburgh. At Edinburgh he was a member of the Juvenile Literary Society, of which Henry Brougham and Francis Horner were the leading spirits, and of the Speculative Society. He corresponded with Horner, till the latter's death in 1817, and his letters form a major part of the Memoirs of Horner, 1843.

In 1800, Murray passed to the Scottish bar. When the Edinburgh Review was founded, Sydney Smith, Horner, Francis Jeffrey, Thomas, and he, met for a time as joint editors in Jeffrey's house. He continued as contributor. His early career at the bar was distinguished, but he had no need to develop it further.

A liberal, Murray threw in his lot with the young Edinburgh Whig lawyers, and took part in the agitation before the Reform Bill of 1832. In December 1832, he was returned unopposed as Member of Parliament for Leith Burghs, which had been enfranchised under the bill. He was appointed recorder of the great roll and clerk of the pipe, a sinecure in the Scottish exchequer which he did not long hold.

On the elevation of Jeffrey to the bench in 1835, Murray succeeded him as Lord Advocate. He introduced a large number of bills into the House of Commons, including measures for the reform of the universities, for giving popular magistracies to small towns, for enabling sheriffs to hold small debt circuits, for the reform of the court of session, and for amending the bankruptcy law, but only succeeded in carrying a few minor reforms. In 1839, he was savagely attacked in parliament by his old friend Brougham for his conduct in the case of five cotton-spinners who were tried on a charge of murder arising out of a trade-union dispute. He answered the charges in the House of Commons.

In 1839 Murray resigned his sear as MP for Leith in order to focus fully on his role in the Court of Session as a law lord under the title of Lord Murray. He was knighted that year, adopting the courtesy title Lord Murray. In 1844 Murray was elected a fellow of the Royal Society of Edinburgh, his proposer being Thomas Stewart Traill. He served as the society's vice president from 1849 to 1857. He remained on the bench till his death at his house 11 Great Stuart Street on the Moray Estate in Edinburgh on 7 March 1859. He was buried in his parents' grave, marked by an elaborate monument, in St Cuthbert's churchyard in central Edinburgh.

== Family ==
He was brother to William Murray of Henderland FRSE (d.1854).

In 1826, Murray married Mary Rigby (1778–1861), the eldest daughter of William Rigby of Oldfield Hall in Cheshire. Their only son died in boyhood.

== Character ==
Murray's hospitality was profuse and famous. Walter Scott in his Diary records evenings spent at Murray's house, and Harriet Martineau celebrates his tea-parties at St. Stephen's when he was Lord Advocate.

In Edinburgh and in his country residence at Strachur on Loch Fyne, and afterwards in Jura, he gathered friends round him, while Lady Murray, an accomplished musician, helped him to entertain them.

Parliament of the United Kingdom
New constituency	Member of Parliament for Leith Burghs; 1832 – 1839	Succeeded by Andrew Rutherfurd
Legal offices
Preceded by Francis Jeffrey	Lord Advocate; May-Nov 1834	Succeeded by William Rae
Preceded by William Rae	Lord Advocate; 1835–1839	Succeeded by Andrew Rutherfurd
