= John Gordon (anatomist) =

Scottish anatomist

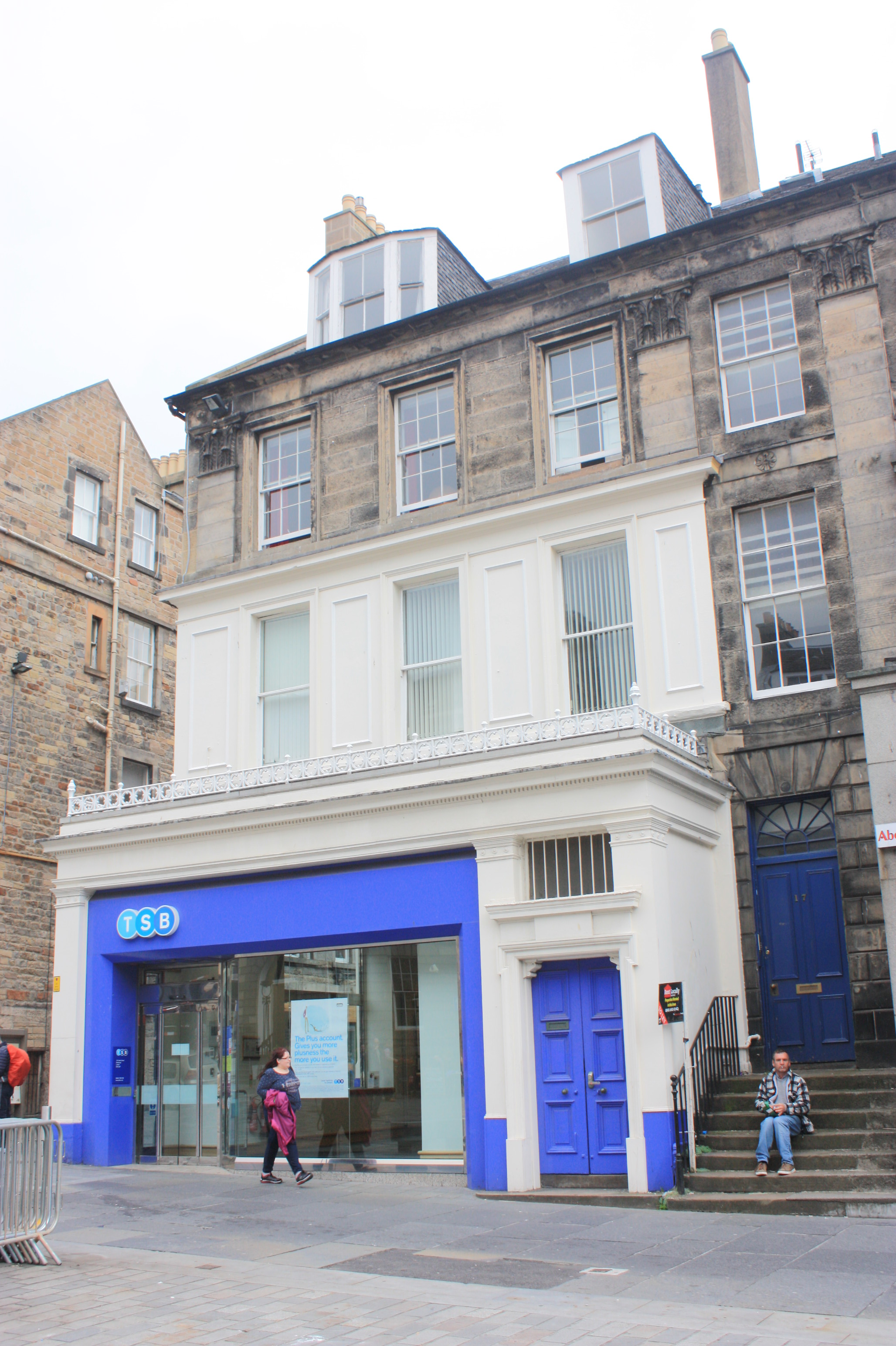
19 Castle Street, Edinburgh

Dr John Gordon FRSE FRCSE (19 April 1786 – 14 June 1818) was a short-lived but influential Scottish anatomist. In 1806 he served as president of the Royal Medical Society. In 1815 he caused an international stir by debunking the new science of phrenology and publicly criticising its principal European exponents, Johann Spurzheim and Franz Joseph Gall.

== Life ==
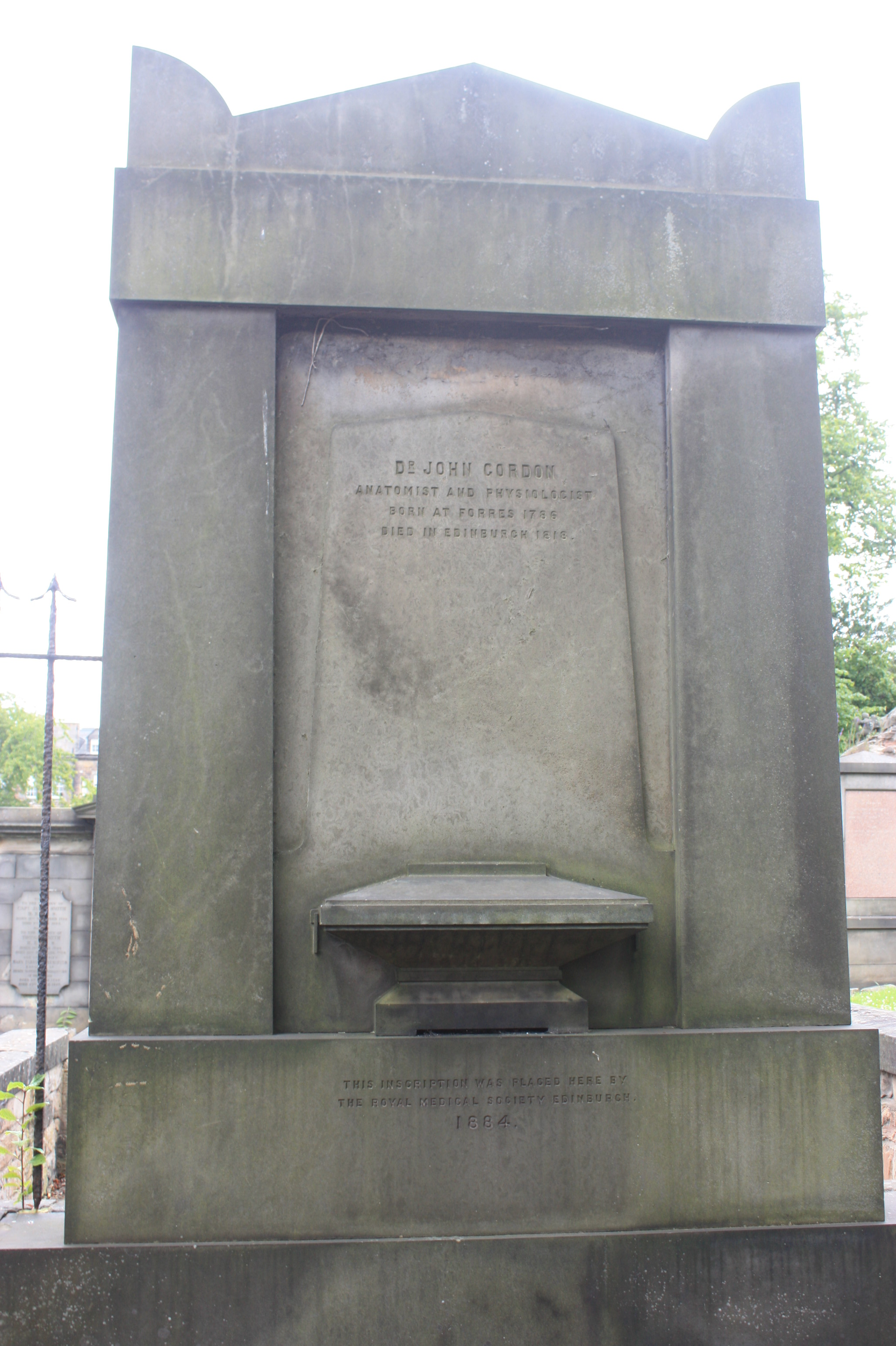
The grave of Dr John Gordon, Greyfriars Kirkyard

He was born on 19 April 1786 in Forres in northern Scotland the son of John Gordon a wine-merchant and banker.

He studied medicine at the University of Edinburgh under Dr John Barclay and philosophy under Dugald Stewart. He gained his doctorate MD in 1805 aged 19. He then did further studies in anatomy in London. A prodigy, he served as President of the Royal Medical Society in 1806 aged just 20. On return to Edinburgh he taught anatomy and physiology at his anatomy school at 9 Surgeons' Square, one of the earliest teachers in the Edinburgh Extramural School of Medicine. he served as a surgeon at the Edinburgh Royal Infirmary on Drummond Street. He was elected a Fellow of the Royal Society of Edinburgh in 1812. His proposers were Thomas Thomson, John Playfair and Thomas Allan.

In June 1815 he published "The Doctrines of Gall and Spurzheim", which while criticising phrenology also did much to publicise this then relatively unknown "science". Ironically in his criticism he gave a concise and erudite summary of the complex dimensions of phrenology, enabling it to be understood to a far wider audience. Gordon instead supported the views of Reil.

He lived at 19 Castle Street in Edinburgh's New Town.

He died on 14 June 1818 aged 32 and was buried in Greyfriars Kirkyard. The large and simple monument stands near the centre of the western extension.

== Family ==
He married the sister of Andrew Rutherfurd, Lord Rutherfurd. Their son was John Thomson Gordon FRSE.
