= List of ship launches in 1844 =

The list of ship launches in 1844 includes a chronological list of some ships launched in 1844.

Date	Ship	Class / type	Builder	Location	Country	Notes
9 January	St. Helen	Brig	Thomas Williams	Caernarfon	United Kingdom	For private owner.
17 January	Hamoaze	Lighter		Devonport Dockyard	United Kingdom	For Royal Navy.
19 January	Agincourt	Merchantman	James Laing & Sons	Deptford	United Kingdom	For Laing & Co.
20 January	Léger	Brig		Lorient	France	For French Navy.
23 January	Laurina	Barque	P. Cato	Liverpool	United Kingdom	For private owner.
26 January	Henrietta	Steamship	Coalbrookdale Company	Ironbridge	United Kingdom	For Coalbrookdale Company.
31 January	Achilles	East Indiaman	P. Chaloner, Sons & Co.	Liverpool	United Kingdom	For private owner.
January	Fawn	Schooner	Stephenson & Stuart	Sunderland	United Kingdom	For Mr. Stephenson.
5 February	Isabella	Brig	Messrs. J. Webster & Co.	Fraserburgh	United Kingdom	For Messrs. John Wemyss & Co.
6 February	Gratitude	Snow	William Potts	Sunderland	United Kingdom	For private owner.
6 February	Janus	Janus-class sloop	Lord Dundonald	Chatham Dockyard	United Kingdom	For Royal Navy.
7 February	Brilliant	Snow	Joseph Helmsley	Sunderland	United Kingdom	For Joseph Helmsley.
February	Lady Pirie	Barque	J. Stobart	Sunderland	United Kingdom	For Mr. Nicholson.
5 March	Descartes	Paddle frigate		Rochefort	France	For French Navy.
5 March	Swift	Clipper	Alexander Linton	Findhorn	United Kingdom	For private owner.
6 March	Fisher	Merchantman	p. Cato	Liverpool	United Kingdom	For private owner.
7 March	Albion	Steamship	Tod and MacGregor	Glasgow	United Kingdom	For private owner.
7 March	Nelson	Barque	Messrs Denny & Rankin	Dumbarton	United Kingdom	For Lewis Potter.
20 March	John Williams	Barque		Harwich	United Kingdom	For London Missionary Society.
31 March	Swift	Clipper	Messrs. George Lunnell & Co.	Bristol	United Kingdom	For Bristol Steam Navigation Company.
March	Granton	Ferry	Messrs. J. B. Maxton & Co	Leith	United Kingdom	For Granton and Burntisland Ferries.
March	Sultana	Barque	builder	Sunderland	United Kingdom	For Mr. Scurfield.
March	Sylph	Paddle steamer	Fletcher & Co.	Deptford	United Kingdom	For Woolwich Steamboat Company.
2 April	Daring	Brig		Portsmouth Dockyard	United Kingdom	For Royal Navy.
2 April	Osprey	Brig		location	United Kingdom	For Royal Navy.
3 April	Boscawen	Third rate		Woolwich Dockyard	United Kingdom	For Royal Navy.
3 April	Flying Fish	Brig		Pembroke Dockyard	United Kingdom	For Royal Navy.
4 April	Burntisland	Ferry	Messrs. Maxton & Co.	Leith	United Kingdom	For Granton & Burntisland Ferries.
4 April	Lion	Steamship	Richard Green	Blackwall	United Kingdom	For Richard Green.
4 April	Meteor	Paddle steamer	Miller, Ravenhill & Co.	Blackwall	United Kingdom	For private owner.
4 April	Monarch	Steamship	Green	Blackwall	United Kingdom	For private owner.
4 April	Wellesley	East Indiaman	Richard Green	Blackwall	United Kingdom	For Richard Green.
6 April	Mountain Maid	Smack	Samuel Mason	Runcorn	United Kingdom	For Thomas Lloyd.
18 April	Salem	Merchantman	Messrs. Stoveld & Robinson	Blyth	United Kingdom	For private owner.
19 April	City of London	Paddle steamer	Robert Napier and Sons	Govan	United Kingdom	For Aberdeen Steam Packet Company.
20 April	Byror	Merchantman	Markham	Stockton-on-Tees	United Kingdom	For private owner.
20 April	Espeigle	Brig	Messrs. Read, Chatfield & Creuze	Chatham Dockyard	United Kingdom	For Royal Navy.
20 April	Mutine	Brig	Fincham	Chatham Dockyard	United Kingdom	For Royal Navy.
20 April	The Countess of Eglington	Steamship	Messrs. Barr & McNab	Paisley	United Kingdom	For private owner.
April	Cruizer	Brig		Chatham Dockyard	United Kingdom	For Royal Navy.
April	Radiant	Snow	F. Oliver	Sunderland	United Kingdom	For Oliver & Co.
2 May	Centurion	Vanguard-class ship of the line		Pembroke Dockyard	United Kingdom	For Royal Navy.
2 May	Nil	Steamship	Messrs. Arman & Couran	Bordeaux	France	For private owner.
3 May	Houqua	Clipper	Brown & Bell	New York City	United States	For A.A. Low & Brother, New York City. Originally built as warship for Chinese government.
4 May	Gwalior	Full-rigged ship	Henry Barrick	Whitby	United Kingdom	For private owner.
4 May	Pilot	Steamship	Messrs. Barr & McNab	Paisley	United Kingdom	For Greenock Railway Company.
11 May	Blue Bonnet	Steam yacht	Messrs. Barr & McNab	Paisley	United Kingdom	For Earl of Eglington and Winton.
22 May	Sunbeam	Paddle steamboat	Messrs. Heighington	Battersea	United Kingdom	For private owner.
31 May	Cressid	Full-rigged ship	Messrs. Robert Steele & Company	Greenock	United Kingdom	For Messrs. Campbell, Anderson & Co.
May	Antioch	Schooner	G. Thompson	Sunderland	United Kingdom	For Mr. Thompson.
May	Sea Park	Merchantman	Laing & Sons	Deptford	United Kingdom	For Duncan Dunbar.
1 June	Ariel	Yacht	Messrs. Menzes & Sons	Leith	United Kingdom	For private owners.
1 June	Leander	Yacht	Messrs. Grindrod & Patrick	Liverpool	United Kingdom	For private owner.
1 June	Monarch	East Indiaman	Green	Blackwall	United Kingdom	For private owner.
1 June	The Great Unknown	Barque	Messrs. W. & A. Anderson	Birkenhead	United Kingdom	For private owner.
1 June	Tudor	Merchantman	Messrs. W. & T. Smith	Newcastle upon Tyne	United Kingdom	For private owner.
3 June	Cardiff Castle	Steamship	Messrs. Caird & Company	Greenock	United Kingdom	For Castle Company.
3 June	Queen	Steamship	Messrs. Wilson	Liverpool	United Kingdom	For James Hartley.
4 June	Lord Elgin	Steamship	John Laird	North Birkenhead	United Kingdom	For P. Lundie.
5 June	Edinburgh Castle	Steamship	Messrs. Smith & Rodgers	Broomielaw	United Kingdom	For Castle Company.
8 June	Sir George Seymour	Full-rigged ship	Somes Bros.	Sunderland, County Durham	United Kingdom	For Joseph Somes.
17 June	Gipsy Queen	Paddle steamer	Messrs. Samuda Brothers	Blackwall, London	United Kingdom	For private owner.
17 June	Porcupine	Paddle steamer		Deptford Dockyard	United Kingdom	For Royal Navy.
24 June	Duke of Wellington	Full-rigged ship	David Calman	Dundee	United Kingdom	For private owner.
29 June	Topaze	Iris-class schooner		Toulon	France	For French Navy.
June	Duke of York	Barque	Ralph Hutchison	Sunderland	United Kingdom	For Burnet & Co.
1 July	Juno	Spartan-class frigate		Pembroke Dockyard	United Kingdom	For Royal Navy.
1 July	Kestrel	Yacht	Handson	Cowes	United Kingdom	For Earl of Yarborough.
2 July	Retribution	Paddle frigate	Sir William Symonds	Chatham Dockyard	United Kingdom	For Royal Navy.
4 July	Collooney	Barque	Messrs. Hall & Son	Aberdeen	United Kingdom	For private owner.
4 July	Thomas Wilson	Steamship	Messrs. Thomas Wilson & Co.	Liverpool	United Kingdom	For private owner.
6 July	Byzantium	full-rigged ship	F. Preston	Great Yarmouth	United Kingdom	For William Carpenter.
19 July	Richard Cobden	Barque	Messrs. James Hodgson & Co.	Liverpool	United Kingdom	For Messrs. Darby & Co.
21 July	Lavinia	Brig			(United Kingdom of Great Britain and Ireland) Colony of Prince Edward Island	For private owner.
27 July	Dolphin	Paddle steamer	Robert Napier and Sons	Govan	United Kingdom	For Messrs. Thomson & Macconnell.
27 July	Fire Queen	Yacht	Robert Napier and Sons	Govan	United Kingdom	For Thomas Assheton Smith.
27 July	Her Majesty	Paddle Steamer	Tod and MacGregor	Glasgow	United Kingdom	For F. Kemp & Company.
30 July	George	Schooner	Gutteridge	Selby	United Kingdom	For private owner.
30 July	Vixen	Barque	Messrs. W. H. Rowan & Co.	Kelvinhaugh	United Kingdom	For private owners.
July	Ami	Merchantman	H. Dixon	Sunderland	United Kingdom	For Mr. Bedlington.
July	Hutton	Merchantman	W. Potts	Sunderland	United Kingdom	For W. Potts.
1 August	Cambria	Steamship	Messr. Robert Steele & Company	Greenock	United Kingdom	For British and North American Royal Mail Steam Packet Company.
2 August	Royal Consort	Paddle steamer	Tod & McGregor	Glasgow	United Kingdom	For F. Kemp & Company.
15 August	Nemesis	Barque	Messrs. Menzies & Co	Leith	United Kingdom	For John Ferguson.
16 August	Pilot	Brig	Messrs. Robert Napier and Sons	Govan	United Kingdom	For British East India Company.
17 August	Mrs. Assheton Smith	Merchantman		Caernarfon	United Kingdom	For private owner.
29 August	Breadalbane	Yacht	Messrs. Barnhill & Co.	Bay of Quick	United Kingdom	For Free Church of Scotland.
29 August	Queen	Paddle steamer	Messrs William Simpson & Son	Aberdeen	United Kingdom	For Aberdeen, Leith & Clyde Shipping Company.
31 August	Guardian	Schooner	A. Leslie	Speymouth	United Kingdom	For private owner.
August	Neptune	Barque	Messrs. Walter Hood & Co.	Aberdeen	United Kingdom	For private owner.
11 September	Flora	Pique-class frigate		Devonport Dockyard	United Kingdom	For Royal Navy.
11 September	Napier	Steamship		Bombay	India	For British East India Company.
12 September	Conqueror	Steamship		Bombay	India	For British East India Company.
13 September	Queen	Barque	James Geddes & Son	Peterhead	United Kingdom	For Mr. Mitchell.
14 September	Faune	Brig		Cherbourg	France	For French Navy.
19 September	Wassernize	Paddle steamer	Messrs. Tayleure & Sanderson	Warrington	United Kingdom	For private owner.
28 September	Sabrina	Steamship	Messrs. Thomas Vernon & Co.	Liverpool	United Kingdom	For City of Cork Steam Packet Company.
28 September	Sampson	Paddle frigate	Oliver Laing	Woolwich Dockyard	United Kingdom	For Royal Navy.
30 September	Earl of Eglington	Full-rigged ship		Ardrossan	United Kingdom	For private owner.
September	Cuba	Barque	T. Lightfoot	Sunderland	United Kingdom	For private owner.
September	Mystery	Steamboat		Greenwich	United Kingdom	For private owner.
September	Napoleon	Merchantman	J. Henderson	Sunderland	United Kingdom	For J. Smith.
11 October	Plymouth	Sloop-of-war		Boston Navy Yard	United States	For United States Navy.
14 October	George Canning	Pilot boat	P. Cato	Liverpool	United Kingdom	For private owner.
15 October	Gladiator	Cyclops-class frigate		Woolwich Dockyard	United Kingdom	For Royal Navy.
26 October	Favourite	Schooner	Messrs. Duthie & Co.	Aberdeen	United Kingdom	For private owner.
28 October	Mondego	Brig-of-war		Lisbon	Portugal	For Portuguese Navy.
28 October	Serra do Pilar	Brig-of-war		Porto	Portugal	For Portuguese Navy.
29 October	Jackal	Jackal-class gunvessel	Robert Napier and Sons	Govan	United Kingdom	For Royal Navy.
1 November	Rostislav	Third rate	I. S. Dimitriev		Russia	For Imperial Russian Navy.
7 November	Kamptulicon	Lifeboat	Elastic Pavement Company	Lambeth	United Kingdom	For Belgian Government.
9 November	Scourge	Bulldog-class sloop		Portsmouth Dockyard	United Kingdom	For Royal Navy.
12 November	Earl of Chester	Merchantman	Messrs. T. and W. Mulvey	Chester	United Kingdom	For Mr. Prowse.
16 November	Poursuivante	Frigate		Toulon	France	For French Navy.
28 November	Lizard	Jackal-class gunvessel	Robert Napier and Sons	Govan	United Kingdom	For Royal Navy.
November	Exertion	Merchantman	H. Dixon	Sunderland	United Kingdom	For Mr. Keiss.
November	Fanny	Brigantine		Hampton	(United Kingdom of Great Britain and Ireland) Colony of New Brunswick	For private owner.
November	Oak	Merchantman	Austin & Mills	Sunderland	United Kingdom	For Austin & Co.
6 December	Meanee	Steamship		Bombay	India	For British East India Company.
7 December	Amethyst	Spartan-class corvette		Devonport Dockyard	United Kingdom	For Royal Navy.
9 December	Eugenie	Frigate		Karlskrona shipyard	Sweden	For Royal Swedish Navy.
14 December	The Ocean Queen	Steamship	Messrs. Vernon & Co.	Liverpool	United Kingdom	For private owner.
22 December	Pascoe Grenfell	Barque	James Laing	Sunderland	United Kingdom	For Ridley & Co.
Unknown date	Alacrity	Merchantman	Austin & Mills	Sunderland	United Kingdom	For Austin & Co.
Unknown date	Alverton	Barque	H. Ferguson	Sunderland	United Kingdom	For Mr. Fergusson.
Unknown date	Amanda	Brigantine			(United Kingdom of Great Britain and Ireland) Unknown	For private owner.
Unknown date	Ann-Batens	Merchantman		Sunderland	United Kingdom	For private owner.
Unknown date	Ariadne	Barque	Lightfoot	Hylton	United Kingdom	For J. Twizell.
Unknown date	Bournabat	Paddle steamer	Acramans, Morgan & Co.	Bristol	United Kingdom	For George Percy Whittall.
Unknown date	Camilla	Barque		Sunderland	United Kingdom	For private owner.
Unknown date	Caroline	Barque	George Worthy	Sunderland	United Kingdom	For W. Ash.
Unknown date	Chaucer	Barque		Glasgow	United Kingdom	For private owner.
Unknown date	City of Aberdeen	Paddle steamer	Robert Napier and Sons	Govan	United Kingdom	For private owner.
Unknown date	City of Glasgow	Paddle steamer	Robert Napier and Sons	Govan	United Kingdom	For private owner.
Unknown date	Claudia	Barque		Southwick	United Kingdom	For Colling & Co.
Unknown date	Courier	Merchantman		Sunderland	United Kingdom	For Taylor & Co.
Unknown date	Crocus	Snow	W. Petrie	Sunderland	United Kingdom	For A. Alcock.
Unknown date	Crown	Merchantman	J. Crown	Sunderland	United Kingdom	For J. Crown.
Unknown date	Dolfijn	Full-rigged ship		Vlissingen	Netherlands	For Royal Netherlands Navy.
Unknown date	Edward Pear	Brig		Sunderland	United Kingdom	For private owner.
Unknown date	Eleanor	Snow	Ralph Hutchinson	Sunderland	United Kingdom	For Storey & Co.
Unknown date	Eliza Sharp	Merchantman	James Laing	Sunderland	United Kingdom	For James Laing.
Unknown date	Emerald	Snow	J. Hutchinson	Sunderland	United Kingdom	For White & Co.
Unknown date	Energy	Merchantman	Peter Austin	Sunderland	United Kingdom	For Benson & Co.
Unknown date	Favourite	Snow	Joseph Helmsley	Sunderland	United Kingdom	For Mr Helmsley.
Unknown date	Gem	Schooner	J. Henderson	Sunderland	United Kingdom	For H. Man.
Unknown date	Grenfell	Snow	J. Stobart	Sunderland	United Kingdom	For Moon & Co.
Unknown date	Huzaar	Full-rigged ship		Vlissingen	Netherlands	For Royal Netherlands Navy.
Unknown date	Heath	Barque		Sunderland	United Kingdom	For H. Alcock.
Unknown date	Houqua	Clipper	Brown & Bell	New York	United States	For A. A. Low & Brother.
Unknown date	Industrious	Snow	Thomas Tiffin Jr. & Benjamin Tiffin	Sunderland	United Kingdom	For Mr. Restarick.
Unknown date	Jamestown	Sloop-of-war		Gosport Navy Yard	United States	For United States Navy.
Unknown date	Jane	Merchantman	Bartram & Lister	Sunderland	United Kingdom	For Smith & Co.
Unknown date	Janus	Merchantman	Benjamin Hodgson & Co.	Sunderland	United Kingdom	For private owner.
Unknown date	J. G. Loane	Steamship		Philadelphia, Pennsylvania	United States	For private owner.
Unknown date	John Edward	Merchantman	Peter Austin	Sunderland	United Kingdom	For J. Munro.
Unknown date	Julia	Schooner	Brundrit & Whiteway	Runcorn	United Kingdom	For private owner.
Unknown date	Juliet Erskine	Barque		Sunderland	United Kingdom	For Erskie & Co.
Unknown date	Lady Pirie	Barque	Rodham & Todd	Sunderland	United Kingdom	For J. Cropton.
Unknown date	Lanchester	Barque		Sunderland	United Kingdom	For Mr. Mitcheson.
Unknown date	Lek	Fourth rate		Dunkirk	France	For Royal Netherlands Navy.
Unknown date	Lucy	Schooner		Sunderland	United Kingdom	For Millar & Sons.
Unknown date	Margaret	Merchantman	W. Micklam & T. Newton	Deptford	United Kingdom	For private owner.
Unknown date	Northumberland	Merchantman	Benjamin Hodgson & Co.	Sunderland	United Kingdom	For Ogle & Co.
Unknown date	Naugatuck	Ironclad gunboat		New York	United States	For United States Revenue Cutter Service.
Unknown date	Nettle	Pilot boat	S. Hall	East Boston, Massachusetts	United States	For E. C. Mosser.
Unknown date	Orb	Merchantman	Tiffin	Sunderland	United Kingdom	For T. Tiffin.
Unknown date	Perseverance	Merchantman	Bartram & Lister	Sunderland	United Kingdom	For Winter & Co.
Unknown date	Planet	Schooner	Bowman and Drummond	Blyth	United Kingdom	For Mr. Moffett.
Unknown date	Princess Mary	Paddle steamer			United Kingdom	For South Eastern Railway.
Unknown date	Princess Maud	Paddle steamer	Ditchburn & Mare	Blackwall, London	United Kingdom	For South Eastern Railway.
Unknown date	Robert J. Walker	Paddle steamer	Joseph Tomlinson	Pittsburgh, Pennsylvania	United States	For United States Coast Survey.
Unknown date	Rocket	Schooner	James Robinson	Sunderland	United Kingdom	For W. Adamson.
Unknown date	Sachem	Clipper		New York City	United States	For private owner
Unknown date	Scindian	Barque		Sunderland	United Kingdom	For J. Allan.
Unknown date	Sharp	Barque	Austin & Mills	Sunderland	United Kingdom	For Mr. Sharp.
Unknown date	Simlah	Barque	J. Crown	Sunderland	United Kingdom	For E. Arthur.
Unknown date	Sir George Seymour	Full-rigged ship		Sunderland	United Kingdom	For J. Somes.
Unknown date	Sir Robert Seppings	Merchantman		Moulmein	Burma	For J. Allen.
Unknown date	St. Mary's	Sloop-of-war	Patterson	St. Mary's, Georgia	United States	For United States Navy.
Unknown date	Sultan	Barque	J. Crown	Sunderland	United Kingdom	For Mr. Watkins.
Unknown date	Thalia	Barque		Sunderland	United Kingdom	For Booth & Co.
Unknown date	Victoria	Merchantman	Bartram & Lister	Sunderland	United Kingdom	For Matthew Smith.
Unknown date	Vos	Full-rigged ship		Rotterdam	Netherlands	For Royal Netherlands Navy.
Unknown date	Waterman No. 12	Steamship	Messrs. Ditchburn & Mare	Blackwall	United Kingdom	For Waterman's Steam Packet Company.
Unknown date	Waterman No. 13	Steamship	Messrs. Ditchburn & Mare	Blackwall	United Kingdom	For Waterman's Steam Packet Company.
Unknown date	Wesp	full-rigged ship		Rotterdam	Netherlands	For Royal Netherlands Navy.
Unknown date	William Nicholson	Barque	W. Wilkinson	Sunderland	United Kingdom	For Mr. Nicholson.
Unknown date	Zealous	Barque	Peter Austin & Sons	Sunderland	United Kingdom	For Mr. Collinson.
Unknown date	Zephyr	Snow	Halls	Sunderland	United Kingdom	For Mr. Davidson.
