= Robert Napier (engineer) =

Scottish marine engineer (1791 – 1876)

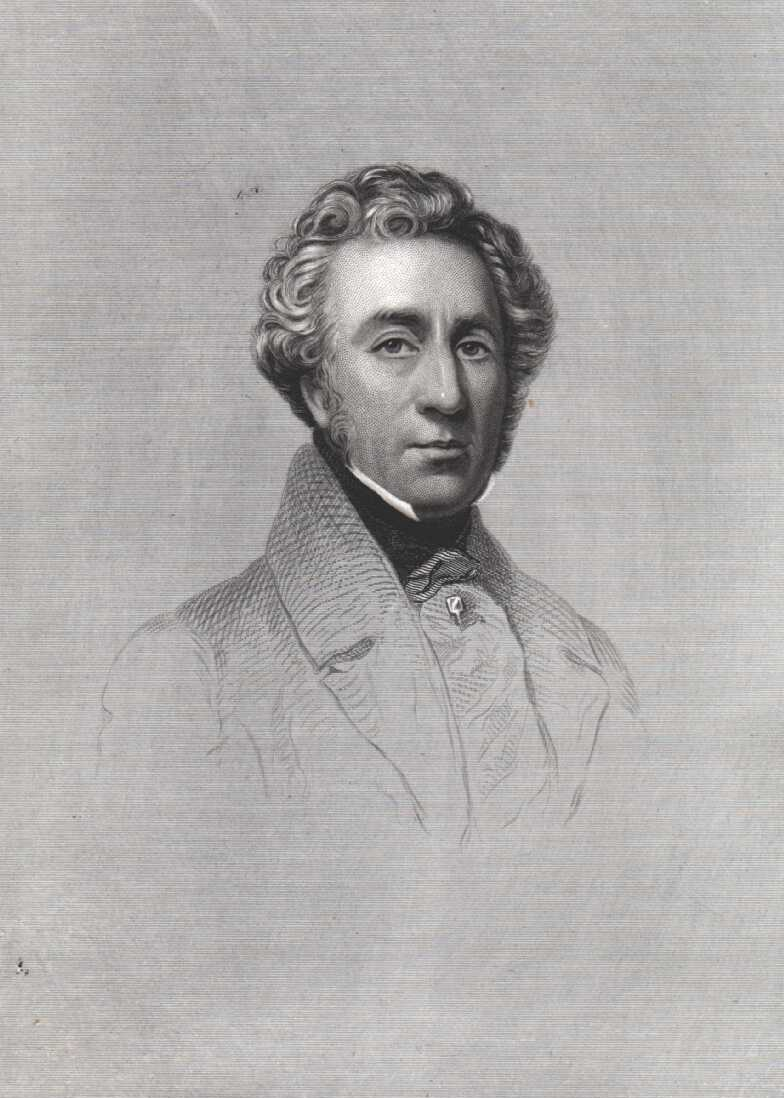
Robert Napier

Robert Napier (21 June 1791 – 23 June 1876) was a Scottish marine engineer known for his contributions to Clyde shipbuilding.

== Early life ==
Robert Napier was born in Dumbarton at the height of the Industrial Revolution, to James and Jean Napier. James was of a line of esteemed bell-wrights, blacksmiths, and engineers, with a brother (also named Robert) who served as blacksmith for the Duke of Argyll at Inveraray Castle.

Napier was educated at the burgh school where he took an interest in drawing, which reflected in his later life in an interest in painting and fine arts. Against his father's hopes that he would become a minister in the Church of Scotland, he developed an interest in the family business. At age sixteen, he was confronted by a Royal Navy press gang who intended to conscript him into service during the Napoleonic Wars. Instead of allowing his son to be conscripted, James Napier signed a contract of formal indenture with his son, making him immune to conscription.

Napier's apprenticeship with his father lasted for five years, after which time he moved to Edinburgh and worked for Robert Stevenson, builder of the Bell Rock Lighthouse.

=== Robert Napier and Sons ===
Napier set up his own business in 1815, and in August 1815 was admitted to the Incorporation of the Hammermen of Glasgow, following the example of his father and grandfather. In 1841 he took his sons James and John into partnership and their firm's name became Robert Napier and Sons.

== Marine engines and shipbuilding ==
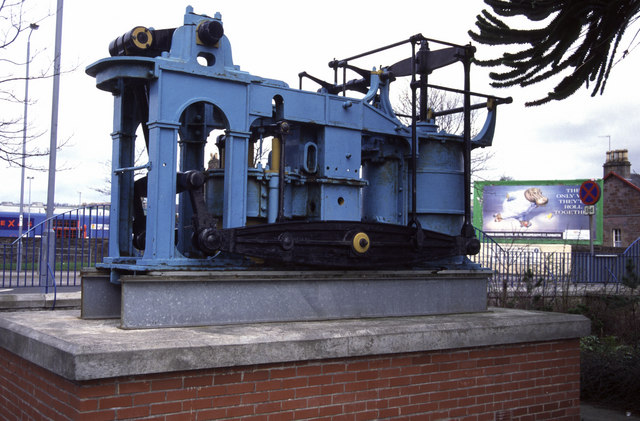
Early side-lever engine designed by Napier, from PS Leven (1823), on display at the Scottish Maritime Museum in Dumbarton

In 1823 he won a contract to build a steam engine for the paddle steamer Leven. The engine was so good that it was later fitted to another ship, the paddle steamer Queen of Beauty. The Leven engine – his first engine – now rests at the Denny Ship Model Experiment Tank branch of the Scottish Maritime Museum in Dumbarton.

In 1827, Napier had the unique distinction of having built the engines of both of the two fastest ships to compete in the Northern Yacht Club's August Regatta, namely the paddle steamers Clarence and Helensburgh. This earned him a reputation as a shipbuilder, which furthered his career, as did his co-operation on hull design with Thomas Assheton Smith, for whom he built the Menai (400 tons and 120 hp) followed by several more steam yachts. In 1828 he established Glasgow's Vulcan Foundry.

Many of Scotland's most esteemed shipbuilders apprenticed under Napier, including James and George Thomson, who founded the J & G Thomson shipyard (now known as John Brown & Company), and John Elder of the Fairfield Shipbuilding and Engineering Company.

Napier continued building steamship engines, eventually expanding into steam engines for ocean-going vessels. In 1835 he procured a controversial contract with the East India Company to build an engine for their ship, the paddle steamer Berenice which, built by David Napier, (Napier's cousin) and using Napier's engine, proved faster than her sister ship, the paddle steamer Atalanta (built on the Thames) – beating her to India by 18 days on their maiden voyage.

In 1838, Napier was contracted by the Admiralty to produce 280 NHP engines for two of their ships, the first class paddle steamer sloops Stromboli and Vesuvius; but after that, orders ceased. When Napier had this queried in Parliament, the reply proved that Napier's engines were cheaper and more reliable than those built in the Admiralty's usual shipyards on the Thames. Thereafter, Napier was the Admiralty's primary engine builder.

Napier's greatest success, however, came from his business deals with Samuel Cunard. Together with Cunard, James Donaldson, Sir George Burns, and David MacIver, he co-founded the British and North American Royal Mail Steam Packet Company. It seems that Napier could be considered responsible for the livery of the Cunard funnels, since the vermilion colour and black hoops were already used on earlier Napier-engined ships, as evidenced by the shipbuilder's model of P.S. "Menai" of 1830 in the Scottish Transport Museum in Glasgow.

In 1841 he expanded his company to include an iron shipbuilding yard in Govan and the Parkhead Forge Steelworks, and in 1843 they produced their first ship, the Vanguard. He also procured a contract with the Royal Navy to produce vessels, notably the Jackal, the Lizard, and the Bloodhound, which became the first iron vessels in the Royal Navy. He allowed naval officers in training to visit the shipyard to familiarise themselves with the new vessels. The Parkhead Forge was acquired by William Beardmore and Company in 1886. Napier's shipyard in Govan was also later acquired by Beardmore's in 1900 before being sold on to Harland & Wolff in 1912, and finally closed in 1962. The Parkhead Forge would eventually close in 1976.

== Honours and awards ==
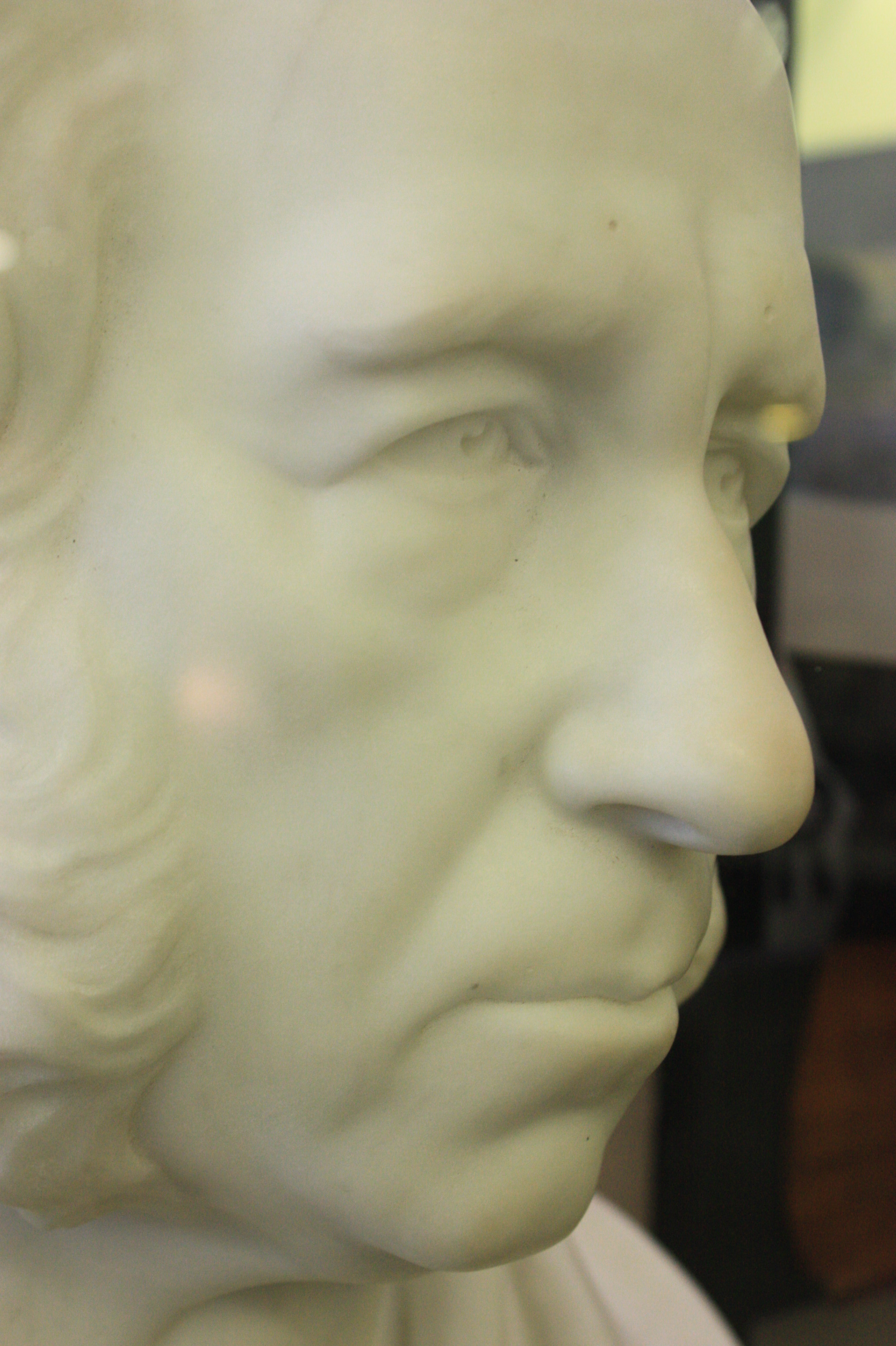
Robert Napier, bust by Edward Wyon 1867

- In 1851 he served as a juror at the Crystal Palace Exhibition
- Appointed a Chevalier of the Légion d'honneur by Napoleon III.
- In 1863, he became President of the Institution of Mechanical Engineers.
- In 1867, Napoleon III made him Royal Commissioner of the Paris Exhibition, and presented him to Empress Eugenie.
- In 1868 he was made Commander of the Most Ancient Order of Dannebrog by King Christian IX of Denmark. Napier's yard had built the iron battleship "Rolf Krake" for the Danish Navy in 1863.
- In 2014 he was inducted into the Scottish Engineering Hall of Fame,

== Art patronage ==
Napier never lost his early interest in art. He built his home in Shandon, by the Gareloch, to house his sizeable art collection, which included work by artists such as Henry Raeburn and Horatio McCulloch, as well as art by Dutch, French and Italian masters.

== Death ==
In 1875 his wife of 57 years, Isabella, died. Shortly afterwards, Napier fell seriously ill, and died the next year, in 1876. He is buried in the Parish Kirkyard, in Dumbarton.

== See also ==
- Robert D. Napier, another contemporary British engineer of the same name.

== Literature ==
- James Napier: Life of Robert Napier of West Shandon. Publisher: William Blackwood and sons, Edinburgh and London 1904
- APPENDIX – I. Copy of original contract for first Cunard steamers, 18 March 1839 in: Life of Robert Napier of West Shandon. By James Napier
- APPENDIX – II. Particulars of some of the leading contracts executed by Mr. Napier

Professional and academic associations
Preceded by William George Armstrong	President of the Institution of Mechanical Engineers; 1863–1865	Succeeded by Joseph Whitworth
