= List of shipwrecks in April 1872 =

The list of shipwrecks in April 1872 includes ships sunk, foundered, grounded, or otherwise lost during April 1872.

== 1 April ==
List of shipwrecks: 1 April 1872
Ship	State	Description
Amanda Jane	Canada	The brigantine ran aground at the mouth of the River Amazon. She was on a voyage from Greenock, Renfrewshire, United Kingdom to Pará, Brazil. She was refloated and resumed her voyage in a leaky condition, but had to be beached at "Vegia".
Baltic	United Kingdom	The brigantine sprang a leak and was beached at Campbeltown, Argyllshire. She was on a voyage from Glasgow, Renfrewshire to Cardiff, Glamorgan.
Matford	United Kingdom	The schooner ran aground on the Corton Sand, in the North Sea off the coast of Suffolk. She was on a voyage from Sunderland, County Durham to Exeter, Devon. She was refloated and taken in to Great Yarmouth, Norfolk in a leaky condition.

== 2 April ==
List of shipwrecks: 2 April 1872
Ship	State	Description
Astrologer	United Kingdom	The steamship ran aground in the New Cut of the Danube. She was on a voyage from Constantinople to Galaţi, Ottoman Empire. She was refloated on 4 April and completed her voyage.
Jessie	United Kingdom	The ketch ran aground on the Woolpack Sand, in the North Sea off the coast of Norfolk and was wrecked. Her six crew survived. She was on a voyage from London to Leith, Lothian.
Viking	United Kingdom	The barque was driven ashore and wrecked in Harlyn Bay with the loss of two lives. Seven people were rescued by the Padstow Lifeboat. She was on a voyage from Cardiff, Glamorgan to Plymouth, Devon.

== 3 April ==
List of shipwrecks: 3 April 1872
Ship	State	Description
Germania	Flag unknown	The steamship was driven ashore on Hiiumaa, Russia. She was refloated with assistance and taken in to Reval, Russia.
Matagorda	United Kingdom	The schooner was wrecked on the Isle of May, Fife. Her crew were rescued. She was on a voyage from Burntisland, Fife to Danzig, Germany.
Storm	United Kingdom	The barque was driven ashore and wrecked on the coast of Brazil. Her crew were rescued. She was on a voyage from Cardiff, Glamorgan to Pará, Brazil.

== 4 April ==
List of shipwrecks: 4 April 1872
Ship	State	Description
Carrick Maid	United Kingdom	The schooner was abandoned in the Atlantic Ocean. Her crew were rescued by the barque Excelsior (United Kingdom). Carrick Maid was on a voyage from the Clyde to the Rio Grande.
Mary Ellen	United Kingdom	The brigantine was driven ashore in the River Mersey and sank. Her crew were rescued by the Point of Ayr Lifeboat. She was on a voyage from Liverpool, Lancashire to Plymouth, Devon.

== 5 April ==
List of shipwrecks: 5 April 1872
Ship	State	Description
Danube	Sweden	The schooner was towed in to Hellevoetsluis, Zeeland, Netherlands in a derelict condition. She had been on a voyage from Newcastle upon Tyne, Northumberland, United Kingdom to Gothenburg.
Dromedary	United Kingdom	The ship was driven ashore on the Isle of Wight.

== 6 April ==
List of shipwrecks: 6 April 1872
Ship	State	Description
Angora	United Kingdom	The schooner foundered in the Irish Sea 20 nautical miles (37 km) north west of The Skerries, Anglesey. Her crew were rescued. She was on a voyage from Irvine, Ayrshire to London.

== 7 April ==
List of shipwrecks: 7 April 1872
Ship	State	Description
Argyll	United Kingdom	The schooner foundered in the Irish Sea 5 nautical miles (9.3 km) north west of The Skerries, Anglesey. Her crew were rescued. She was on a voyage from Bangor, Caernarfonshire to Dundalk, County Louth.
Bosphorus	United Kingdom	The steamship was driven ashore at Breaksea Point, Glamorgan. She was refloated with the assistance of two tugs and taken in to Penarth, Glamorgan.
Davidi	Italy	The barque was driven ashore and wrecked near Algiers, Algeria.
Furness Abbey	United Kingdom	The schooner was driven ashore at Ayr. She was on a voyage from Belfast, County Antrim to Troon, Ayrshire.
Mariquitas	Spain	The schooner was wrecked at the mouth of the Minho. Her crew were rescued. She was on a voyage from Marín to "Campos Ancos".

== 8 April ==
List of shipwrecks: 8 April 1872
Ship	State	Description
Adelaide Baker	United Kingdom	The ship was driven ashore on Grand Bahama, Bahamas. She was on a voyage from New Orleans, Louisiana, United States to Liverpool, Lancashire. She was later refloated and taken in to Nassau, Bahamas.
George Pyman	United Kingdom	The steamship sprang a leak and foundered off the Dogger Bank. Her seventeen crew were rescued by fishing smacks. She was on a voyage from Middlesbrough, Yorkshire to Hamburg, Germany.
Kensington	United Kingdom	The brigantine was driven ashore at Seascale, Cumberland. She was on a voyage from Dublin to Whitehaven, Cumberland. She was later refloated.
Margaret	United Kingdom	The brigantine was wrecked near the Point of Ayr Lighthouse, Cheshire. She was on a voyage from Queensferry, Flintshire to Plymouth, Devon.
Maria	United Kingdom	The barque was driven ashore at Coleraine, County Antrim.
Merton	United Kingdom	The schooner was driven ashore at Borth, Cardiganshire. She was on a voyage from Falmouth, Cornwall to Runcorn, Cheshire.
Strathmore	United Kingdom	The barque collided with the barque Glengaber (United Kingdom) and sank in the River Mersey. Her crew were rescued. Strathmore was on a voyage from Singapore, Straits Settlements to Liverpool, Lancashire. She was refloated on 22 April and beached. She broke in two on 7 May.

== 9 April ==
List of shipwrecks: 9 April 1872
Ship	State	Description
Elizabeth	United Kingdom	The ship was wrecked near the Ribble Lighthouse, Lancashire. Her crew were rescued. She was on a voyage from Piel Island to Preston, Lancashire. Also reported as on a voyage from Preston to Kiel, Germany.
Marie Nicholson	United Kingdom	The ship was driven ashore in Gibraltar Bay.
Tokei Marie	Japan	The ship was wrecked between Cape Esau and Cape Blunt, Hokkaido. All on board survived.

== 10 April ==
List of shipwrecks: 10 April 1872
Ship	State	Description
Charles H. Southard	United States	The ship struck a sunken wreck and was damaged. She was on a voyage from New Orleans, Louisiana to Liverpool, Lancashire, United Kingdom. She put back to New Orleans in a leaky condition.
John	United Kingdom	The ship was run ashore at Plymouth, Devon. She was on a voyage from Plymouth to Hull, Yorkshire. She was condemned.

== 11 April ==
List of shipwrecks: 11 April 1872
Ship	State	Description
HMS Jackal	Royal Navy	The Jackal-class gunvessel was driven ashore at the mouth of the River Aray. She was refloated.
P. B. King	(United Kingdom of Great Britain and Ireland) Turks Islands	The schooner was wrecked on a reef off the Grand Turk Lighthouse. She was on a voyage from St. Jago de Cuba, Cuba to the Turks Islands.
Wimbledon	United Kingdom	The ship was driven ashore on the South Breakers off the coast of Georgia, United States. She was on a voyage from Darien, Georgia to Liverpool, Lancashire. She was refloated the next day.
Unnamed	United Kingdom	The schooner collided with a steamship and sank in the Gull Stream. Her crew were rescued by the steamship.

== 12 April ==
List of shipwrecks: 12 April 1872
Ship	State	Description
Maori	United Kingdom	The schooner struck the Carr Rock and sank north west of Fife Ness. She was on a voyage from Montrose, Forfarshire to Charleston, South Carolina, United States.
Palkee	India	The buggalow was run down and sunk by the steamship Livornio (Italy) at Bombay with the loss of eleven of the 44 people on board.

== 13 April ==
List of shipwrecks: 13 April 1872
Ship	State	Description
Sorrento	United Kingdom	The steamship sank at Cardiff, Glamorgan.

== 15 April ==
List of shipwrecks: 15 April 1872
Ship	State	Description
Adele Oswald	Germany	The brig was driven ashore and wrecked on the Manga Paui Rocks, 12 nautical miles (22 km) south of Zanzibar in a hurricane with the loss of all thirteen crew.
Bushire Merchant	United Kingdom	The full-rigged ship was driven ashore and wrecked in a hurricane at Zanzibar. Her crew were rescued.
El Majidi	Sultanate of Zanzibar	The full-rigged ship was driven ashore in a hurricane at Zanzibar. Her crew were rescued. She was refloated on 7 July.
Euphemia	United Kingdom	The schooner sprang a leak and was beached on the Isle of Arran, where she was wrecked. Her crew were rescued. She was on a voyage from Troon, Ayrshire to Belfast, County Antrim.
Fiera Mosca	United Kingdom	The ship caught fire at Liverpool, Lancashire, United Kingdom and was scuttled.
Hinrich	Germany	The schooner sank in the North Sea. Her crew were rescued. She was on a voyage from Hamburg to a British port.
Iskandar Shah	Sultanate of Zanzibar	The frigate was driven ashore and wrecked in a hurricane at Zanzibar. Her crew were rescued.
Kiboko	Sultanate of Zanzibar	The steam launch was driven ashore and wrecked in a hurricane at Zanzibar.
Lobelia	United Kingdom	The ship was driven ashore and wrecked in a hurricane at Zanzibar. Her crew were rescued.
Palmer	United Kingdom	The schooner was wrecked at Walcott, Norfolk.
Secunder Shah	Sultanate of Zanzibar	The yacht was driven ashore and wrecked in a hurricane at Zanzibar.
Shah Allum	Sultanate of Zanzibar	The corvette was driven ashore and wrecked in a hurricane at Zanzibar. Her crew were rescued.
Suleyman Shah	Sultanate of Zanzibar	The ship was driven ashore and wrecked in a hurricane at Zanzibar. Her crew were rescued.
Star	Sultanate of Zanzibar	The steamship sank in a hurricane at Zanzibar. Her crew were rescued.
Sultana	Sultanate of Zanzibar	The steamship was lost in a hurricane at Zanzibar . Her crew were rescued.

== 16 April ==
List of shipwrecks: 16 April 1872
Ship	State	Description
Ciara Brown	Flag unknown	The schooner was taken in to Saint John's, Newfoundland Colony in a derelict condition.

== 17 April ==
List of shipwrecks: 17 April 1872
Ship	State	Description
Fleur de Marie	United Kingdom	The schooner ran aground on the Burbo Bank, in Liverpool Bay and sank. Her crew survived. She was on a voyage from Teignmouth, Devon to Liverpool, Lancashire.
Johan Wilhelm	Norway	The ship was abandoned in the North Sea. Her crew were rescued by the brig Forenginen (Norway). Johan Wilhelm was on a voyage from Kragerø to Buckie, Banffshire, United Kingdom.
Lutzken	Germany	The barque caught fire at New York and was scuttled.
Mary Catherine	United Kingdom	The Yorkshire Billyboy collided with the Yorkshire Billyboy Village Maid (United Kingdom) and sank in the River Thames at Blackwall, Middlesex.
Merry Andrew	United Kingdom	The tug collided with another vessel and sank in the River Mersey.
Ocean Bird	New Zealand	The 33-ton schooner left Lyttelton Harbour. The master of the schooner Emerald (New Zealand) reported seeing her capsized hull to the west of Stephens Island a week later. All three men on board perished. The steamer Lyttelton, aided by the steamer Charles Edward (both New Zealand) managed to tow her to Nelson.
Unnamed	United Kingdom	The Mersey Flat sank in the River Mersey off Seacombe, Cheshire.

== 18 April ==
List of shipwrecks: 18 April 1872
Ship	State	Description
Ellen Lewis	United Kingdom	The barque caught fire at Singapore, Straits Settlements and was scuttled. She was on a voyage from Amoy, China to Singapore. She was refloated.

== 19 April ==
List of shipwrecks: 19 April 1872
Ship	State	Description
Mathilde	Spain	The barque caught fire in the Atlantic Ocean and was abandoned by her crew.

== 20 April ==
List of shipwrecks: 20 April 1872
Ship	State	Description
Alcyone	Netherlands	The ship was sighted off Anjer, Netherlands East Indies whilst bound for a Dutch port. No further trace, presumed foundered with the loss of all hands.
Alicia	United Kingdom	The barque was wrecked at Rangoon, Burma. She was on a voyage from Rangoon to Singapore, Straits Settlements.
Antonie	United Kingdom	The ship was driven ashore and wrecked on North Ronaldshay, Orkney Islands. Her crew were rescued. She was on a voyage from Stettin, Germany to Liverpool, Lancashire.
Barbara Christine	Norway	The galiot was wrecked on the Haisborough Sands, in the North Sea off the coast of Norfolk, United Kingdom with the loss of four of her five crew. The survivor was rescued by John and Emma (United Kingdom). Barbara Christine was on a voyage from Bergen to a French port.
Fritz Gruber	Greece	The schooner was destroyed by fire at Pyrgos.
Neva	France	The steamship ran aground in the Bangka Strait and was wrecked.
Rona	China	The steamship collided with the steamship Ava (France) and sank at Hong Kong. Two crew were rescued, 60 crew were reported missing.

== 21 April ==
List of shipwrecks: 21 April 1872
Ship	State	Description
Brothers	United Kingdom	The sloop was driven ashore and severely damaged at Rothesay, Isle of Bute.
Leonie	France	The schooner was driven ashore near Gravelines, Nord. She was on a voyage from Gravelines to London, United Kingdom.
Little Nell	United Kingdom	The fishing boat foundered off Ameland, Friesland, Netherlands. Her crew were rescued.
Mariette	France	The brig was driven ashore and wrecked at Kingstown, County Dublin, United Kingdom. Her twelve crew were rescued. She was on a voyage from Nantes, Loire-Inférieure to Londonderry, United Kingdom.
Princess Elfida	United Kingdom	The barque foundered off the Dudgeon Sandbank, in the North Sea. Her crew were rescued by the barque Hercules (United Kingdom). Princess Elfida was on a voyage from South Shields, County Durham to Odesa, Russia.
Sally Anne	United Kingdom	The schooner was driven ashore and wrecked at Kingstown with the loss of one of her three crew. She was on a voyage from Portmadoc, Caernarfonshire to Londonderry.
Thomas	United Kingdom	The brigantine ran aground on the Little Burbo Sandbank, in Liverpool Bay. She floated off and sank at the mouth of the River Mersey with the loss of one of her four crew. Survivors were rescued by the pilot boat No. 12 (United Kingdom). Thomas was on a voyage from Liverpool, Lancashire to Waterford.

== 22 April ==
List of shipwrecks: 22 April 1872
Ship	State	Description
Amphitrite	United Kingdom	The ship ran aground on the Herd Sand, in the North Sea off the coast of County Durham. Her crew were rescued by the South Shields Lifeboat. Amphitrite was on a voyage from Dieppe, Seine-Inférieure, France to South Shields, County Durham. She was refloated on 8 May and taken in to South Shields.
Aurora	United Kingdom	The schooner was wrecked near Fowey, Cornwall. Her crew were rescued. She was on a voyage from Newport, Monmouthshire to Charlestown, Cornwall.
Bonnie	United Kingdom	The ship ran aground on the West Hoyle Bank, in Liverpool Bay. Her crew were rescued by the Hoylake and Point of Ayr Lifeboats. She was refloated.
Intrepid	United Kingdom	The schooner was driven ashore near Greenore, County Louth. She was on a voyage from Wexford to Neath, Glamorgan. She was refloated on 24 April.
Isabella Hunter	United Kingdom	The ship was driven ashore and wrecked near Cape Bon, Beylik of Tunis. She was on a voyage from Patras, Greece to a British port.
Magdalena	Malta	The ship was driven ashore and wrecked near Cape Bon.
Margaret and Ann	United Kingdom	The schooner sank off Leith, Lothian. Her crew survived. She was on a voyage from Newcastle upon Tyne, Northumberland to Nairn.

== 23 April ==
List of shipwrecks: 23 April 1872
Ship	State	Description
Ceres	United Kingdom	The ship was driven ashore between Amble and Cresswell, Northumberland. She was refloated on 25 April.
Daniel Huntley	Canada	The brigantine was abandoned in the Irish Sea. Her crew were rescued by Travancore (United Kingdom). Daniel Huntley was on a voyage from Swansea, Glamorgan to Belfast, County Antrim, United Kingdom.
Queen of the East	United States	The clipper was wrecked on a reef in the Pacific Ocean. Her crew survived. She was on a voyage from San Francisco, California to Newcastle, New South Wales and Hong Kong.

== 24 April ==
List of shipwrecks: 24 April 1872
Ship	State	Description
Evora	United Kingdom	The steamship was driven onto rocks at Montevideo, Uruguay. All on board survived. She was a total loss.
Ingeborg	Sweden	The ship ran aground, capsized and sank at Whitby, Yorkshire, United Kingdom. She was on a voyage from Bergen to Whitby.

== 25 April ==
List of shipwrecks: 25 April 1872
Ship	State	Description
Alert	United Kingdom	The ship struck the pier at Dunkirk, Nord, France and sank. She was on a voyage from Charlestown, Cornwall to Dunkirk. She was refloated.
Cynthia	United Kingdom	The steamship was driven onto the Bondicar Rocks, on the coast of Northumberland. She was refloated and resumed her voyage.
Princess Elfrida	United Kingdom	The ship was abandoned off the Dudgeon Sandbank, in the North Sea. Her fourteen crew survived. She was on a voyage from the River Tyne to Odesa, Russia.

== 26 April ==
List of shipwrecks: 26 April 1872
Ship	State	Description
HMS Hawk	Royal Navy	The gunboat ran aground on Butler Pladdy, off the Irish coast. She was refloated and taken in to Kingstown, County Dublin.
Nant-y-glo	United Kingdom	The brig was wrecked at East London, Cape Colony Her crew were rescued.
Susan Pardew	Canada	The ship was wrecked in Algoa Bay. Her crew were rescued. She was on a voyage from Mossel Bay to Montreal, Quebec.

== 28 April ==
List of shipwrecks: 28 April 1872
Ship	State	Description
Aurora	(Dominion of Newfoundland) Newfoundland Colony	The sealer was sunk by ice off the coast of Labrador with the loss of 74 lives.
Auster	(Dominion of Newfoundland) Newfoundland Colony	The sealer was sunk by ice off the coast of Labrador with the loss of 97 lives.
Balaklava	(Dominion of Newfoundland) Newfoundland Colony	The sealer was sunk by ice off the coast of Labrador with the loss of 79 lives.
Bloodhound	(Dominion of Newfoundland) Newfoundland Colony	The sealer, a steamship, collided with an iceberg off the coast of Labrador. She was abandoned the next day and sank. Her 125 crew were rescued by the steamship Nimrod ( (Dominion of Newfoundland) Newfoundland Colony).
Brothers	(Dominion of Newfoundland) Newfoundland Colony	The sealer, a brig, was driven ashore at Battle Harbour, Labrador. Her crew were rescued by the steamship Nimrod ( (Dominion of Newfoundland) Newfoundland Colony).
Brothers	(Dominion of Newfoundland) Newfoundland Colony	The sealer was sunk by ice off the coast of Labrador with the loss of 90 lives.
Dolphin	(Dominion of Newfoundland) Newfoundland Colony	The sealer was driven ashore at Battle Harbour. Her crew survived.
Eclipse	(Dominion of Newfoundland) Newfoundland Colony	The sealer was sunk by ice off the coast of Labrador with the loss of 99 lives.
Edgar Doran	(Dominion of Newfoundland) Newfoundland Colony	The sealer was sunk by ice off the coast of Labrador with the loss of 102 lives.
Eglantine	(Dominion of Newfoundland) Newfoundland Colony	The sealer was sunk by ice off the coast of Labrador with the loss of 80 lives.
Emily Ann	(Dominion of Newfoundland) Newfoundland Colony	The sealer was sunk by ice off the coast of Labrador with the loss of 113 lives.
Esquimaux	(Dominion of Newfoundland) Newfoundland Colony	The sealer was sunk by ice off the coast of Labrador with the loss of 104 lives.
First Fruit	(Dominion of Newfoundland) Newfoundland Colony	The sealer was sunk by ice off the coast of Labrador with the loss of 75 lives.
Flash	(Dominion of Newfoundland) Newfoundland Colony	The sealer was sunk by ice off the coast of Labrador with the loss of 101 lives.
Glencoe	(Dominion of Newfoundland) Newfoundland Colony	The sealer was driven ashore at Battle Harbour. Her crew survived.
Hawk	(Dominion of Newfoundland) Newfoundland Colony	The sealer, a steamship was sunk by ice off the coast of Labrador with the loss of 175 lives.
Hector	(Dominion of Newfoundland) Newfoundland Colony	The sealer was sunk by ice off the coast of Labrador with the loss of 100 lives.
Herbert Luby	(Dominion of Newfoundland) Newfoundland Colony	The sealer was sunk by ice off the coast of Labrador with the loss of 98 lives.
Hero	(Dominion of Newfoundland) Newfoundland Colony	The sealer was sunk by ice off the coast of Labrador with the loss of 42 lives.
Home of the North	(Dominion of Newfoundland) Newfoundland Colony	The sealer was sunk by ice off the coast of Labrador with the loss of 132 lives.
Hunter	(Dominion of Newfoundland) Newfoundland Colony	The sealer was sunk by ice off the coast of Labrador with the loss of 50 lives.
Huntsman	(Dominion of Newfoundland) Newfoundland Colony	The sealer, a brig was destroyed by ice off the coast of Newfoundland with the loss of 45 or 55 of the 62 people on board. Survivors were rescued by Rescue ( (Dominion of Newfoundland) Newfoundland Colony).
Iceland	(Dominion of Newfoundland) Newfoundland Colony	The sealer, a steamship, was sunk by ice off the coast of Labrador with the loss of 132 lives.
Ironsides	(Dominion of Newfoundland) Newfoundland Colony	The sealer was sunk by ice off the coast of Labrador with the loss of 115 lives.
Laplander	(Dominion of Newfoundland) Newfoundland Colony	The sealer was sunk by ice off the coast of Labrador with the loss of 80 lives.
Leonora	(Dominion of Newfoundland) Newfoundland Colony	The sealer was sunk by ice off the coast of Labrador with the loss of 62 lives.
Lord Clyde	(Dominion of Newfoundland) Newfoundland Colony	The sealer was driven ashore at Battle Harbour. Her crew survived.
Lord of the Isles	(Dominion of Newfoundland) Newfoundland Colony	The sealer was sunk by ice off the coast of Labrador with the loss of 75 lives.
Lucknow	(Dominion of Newfoundland) Newfoundland Colony	The sealer was sunk by ice off the coast of Labrador with the loss of 98 lives.
Maid of Judah	(Dominion of Newfoundland) Newfoundland Colony	The sealer was sunk by ice off the coast of Labrador with the loss on 97 lives.
Margante	(Dominion of Newfoundland) Newfoundland Colony	The sealer was sunk by ice off the coast of Labrador with the loss of 45 lives.
Mary Jane	(Dominion of Newfoundland) Newfoundland Colony	The sealer was sunk by ice off the coast of Labrador with the loss of 43 lives.
Meteor	(Dominion of Newfoundland) Newfoundland Colony	The sealer was sunk by ice off the coast of Labrador with the loss of 70 lives.
Nightingale	(Dominion of Newfoundland) Newfoundland Colony	The sealer was sunk by ice off the coast of Labrador with the loss of 65 lives.
Pride of the Sea	(Dominion of Newfoundland) Newfoundland Colony	The sealer was sunk by ice off the coast of Labrador with the loss of 117 lives.
Queen of the Isles	(Dominion of Newfoundland) Newfoundland Colony	The sealer was sunk by ice off the coast of Labrador with the loss of 96 lives.
Redman	(Dominion of Newfoundland) Newfoundland Colony	The sealer was sunk by ice off the coast of Labrador with the loss of 68 lives.
R. G. Y.	(Dominion of Newfoundland) Newfoundland Colony	The sealer was sunk by ice off the coast of Labrador with the loss of all 100 crew.
Rover	(Dominion of Newfoundland) Newfoundland Colony	The sealer was sunk by ice off the coast of Labrador with the loss of 90 lives.
Sandbach	United Kingdom	The ship was driven into Christabel and Rachel Blackwood (both United Kingdom) and drove ashore at Demerara, British Guiana. She was severely damaged.
Spark	(Dominion of Newfoundland) Newfoundland Colony	The sealer was sunk by ice off the coast of Labrador with the loss of 102 lives.
Teira Nova	(Dominion of Newfoundland) Newfoundland Colony	The sealer was sunk by ice off the coast of Labrador with the loss of 115 lives.
Twin Sisters	(Dominion of Newfoundland) Newfoundland Colony	The sealer, a brig was sunk by ice off the coast of Labrador with the loss of 73 of her 98 crew. Survivors were rescued by the steamship Retriever ( (Dominion of Newfoundland) Newfoundland Colony).
William V. May	(Dominion of Newfoundland) Newfoundland Colony	The sealer was sunk by ice off the coast of Labrador with the loss of 91 lives.
Witch of the Waves	(Dominion of Newfoundland) Newfoundland Colony	The sealer was sunk by ice off the coast of Labrador with the loss of 93 lives.

== 29 April ==
List of shipwrecks: 29 April 1872
Ship	State	Description
Amalia Emma	Netherlands	The schooner was discovered abandoned in the North Sea by the smack Poolster (Flag unknown). She was taken in tow but sank.
Baggio Asserto	Italy	The barque struck the Long Pladdy, off the Irish coast and sank. She was on a voyage from Odesa, Russia to Londonderry, United Kingdom.
Monticello	United States	The steamship foundered in the North Atlantic Ocean 130 nautical miles (240 km) off Saint Pierre Island. All 130 people on board were rescued by a French steamship.
Retriever	(Dominion of Newfoundland) Newfoundland Colony	The sealer, a steamship, ran aground 3 nautical miles (5.6 km) off Battle Harbour, Labrador and was abandoned by the 165 people on board, who were rescued by the steamship Nimrod ( (Dominion of Newfoundland) Newfoundland Colony). Retriever sank the next day.

== 30 April ==
List of shipwrecks: 30 April 1872
Ship	State	Description
Colin Russell	United Kingdom	The schooner was run into by Naomi and Jane (United Kingdom) and sank at Ramsey, Isle of Man. Her crew survived. Colin Russell was on a voyage from Whitehaven, Cumberland to Strangford, County Down.

== Unknown date ==
List of shipwrecks: Unknown date in April 1872
Ship	State	Description
Alma	United Kingdom	The barque was abandoned in the Atlantic Ocean before 6 April.
Alpha	Norway	The ship was wrecked on Anholt, Denmark. She was on a voyage from Drammen to Memel, Germany.
Anna	United Kingdom	The schooner was wrecked off Domesnes, Russia. Her crew were rescued. She was on a voyage from Riga, Russia to Leith, Lothian.
Antares	Germany	The ship was wrecked off the Norwegian coast.
Argo	United Kingdom	The brig was driven ashore in "Dunworldy Bay". She was on a voyage from New York, United States to Queenstown, County Cork She subsequently capsized but her crew were rescued.
Argyll	United Kingdom	The ship foundered off The Skerries, Anglesey.
Arragon	United Kingdom	The ship ran aground on Governor's Island, New York. She was on a voyage from Bristol, Gloucestershire to New York.
Aurora	United Kingdom	The ship foundered off The Skerries. She was on a voyage from Bangor, Caernarfonshire to Dundalk, County Louth.
Ayton	United Kingdom	The ship was driven ashore at Barber's Point, in the Dardanelles. She was on a voyage from Newcastle upon Tyne, Northumberland to Constantinople, Ottoman Empire. She was refloated with assistance from the tug Anna Dorthes (Ottoman Empire).
Bebbington	United Kingdom	The ship ran aground in Saint Helena Sound. She was on a voyage from the Bull River to London. She was refloated and resumed her voyage.
Bidwell	United States	The barque was abandoned in the Atlantic Ocean. Her crew were rescued. She was on a voyage from Philadelphia, Pennsylvania to Antwerp, Belgium.
Brothers	United Kingdom	The Mersey Flat was driven ashore in the Hilbre Islands, Cheshire.
Candace	United Kingdom	The ship was driven ashore at "Crapad Harbour", Prince Edward Island, Canada. She was on a voyage from Prince Edward Island to Liverpool, Lancashire.
Compass	United Kingdom	The ship ran aground at Clonakilty, County Cork. She was on a voyage from Cork to Clonakilty.
Concordia	United Kingdom	The steamship ran aground in Gabarus Bay and was wrecked. She was on a voyage from New Orleans, Louisiana, United States to Liverpool.
Cortes	Spain	The steamship was abandoned in the Atlantic Ocean in a sinking condition. Her crew were rescued by the steamship Ville de Cadiz (France). Cortes was on a voyage from Barcelona to London, United Kingdom.
C. W. Minott	United States	The ship was wrecked on Salt Key. She was on a voyage from New York to Matanzas, Cuba.
Dacian	United Kingdom	The steamship was wrecked on Flint Rock, in Clam Bay, Nova Scotia, Canada. All on board survived. She was on a voyage from London to Halifax, Nova Scotia.
Daniel	Netherlands	The brig sprang a leak and was abandoned at sea. Her crew were rescued. She was on a voyage from Cardiff, Glamorgan, United Kingdom to Lisbon, Portugal.
Eliza	United Kingdom	The schooner was driven ashore at the Point of Ayr, Cheshire. She was on a voyage from London to Saltney, Cheshire.
Elizabeth	Nicaragua	The steamship ran aground in Lake Nicaragua and was wrecked.
Everett Grey	United Kingdom	The barque sank in the River Thames at Blackwall, Middlesex. She was refloated and beached.
Farval	Norway	The ship put in to Fraserburgh, Aberdeenshire, United Kingdom in a waterlogged condition.
Flor del Mar	Spain	The polacca was wrecked near Peniche, Portugal. Her crew were rescued.
Florencia	Spain	The schooner was wrecked at Caminha, Portugal. She was on a voyage from Oliva to London.
Gerhard	Germany	The ship was wrecked off Thisted, Denmark. She was on a voyage from Newcastle upon Tyne to Riga.
Gouverneur de Rouville	France	The ship ran aground at San Juan Bautista, Mexico. She was on a voyage from Liverpool to Santo Domingo Tonalá. She had been refloated by 2 May and subsequently resumed her voyage.
Hailoong	China	The steamship was driven ashore at Breaker Point, near Swatow. Her crew were rescued. She was later refloated and towed in to Hong Kong.
Heimdall	United Kingdom	The ship was abandoned in ice in the Atlantic Ocean. Her crew survived. She was on a voyage from Kilrush, County Clare to Richibucto, New Brunswick, Canada.
Helena	Norway	The ship capsized in the North Sea before 19 April.
Henry Lawson	United Kingdom	The ship was wrecked in Motril Bay. Her crew were rescued. She was on a voyage from the River Tyne to Motril, Spain.
Jane A. Bishop	United Kingdom	The ship was wrecked at São Miguel Island, Azores with the loss of a crew member. She was on a voyage from Gaboon to Hamburg, Germany.
Jeune Maria	France	The ship was driven ashore at Saint-Gilles-Croix-de-Vie, Vendée. She was on a voyage from La Rochelle, Charente-Inférieure to Gloucester, United Kingdom.
Kathleen Allen	United Kingdom	The ship was driven ashore near Riga.
Lahore	United Kingdom	The ship was abandoned at sea. She was on a voyage from Newcastle upon Tyne, Northumberland to Naples, Italy.
Louise	United Kingdom	The ship was driven ashore at Ars-en-Ré, Charente-Inférieure. She was on a voyage from Saint-Martin-de-Ré, Charente-Inférieure to Saint Pierre.
Magnet	New Zealand	The 153-ton brig was reported missing in April. In mid-May, the mate of the ketch Mary reported seeing a floating derelict brig drifting near the mouth of the Whanganui Inlet, which was thought to be the Magnet.
Maria Eugenia	Chile	The schooner was discovered abandoned in the Boca del Guazu, evidently having been attacked. Her cargo had been stolen and several dead crew were on board.
Marie	United Kingdom	The ship was driven ashore at Coleraine, County Antrim. She was on a voyage from Newnham, Gloucestershire to Coleraine.
Matichia	Greece	The brig collided with the steamship Staffa (United Kingdom) and sank in the Bosphorus.
May Flower	Flag unknown	The ship was wrecked off Seal Island, Nova Scotia. She was on a voyage from Boston, Massachusetts, United States to Halifax.
Melanie	France	The barque was wrecked at "Point Indeo", Brazil.
Miguel	Spain	The brigantine was wrecked near Peniche. Her crew were rescued.
Mindanao	United Kingdom	The ship was driven ashore in Lynas Cove. She was on a voyage from Leith to Liverpool. She was refloated and towed in to Liverpool.
Mogart	Canada	The barque was abandoned in the Atlantic Ocean before 16 April.
Mona's Queen	(United Kingdom of Great Britain and Ireland) Isle of Man	The schooner foundered in the Irish Sea 12 nautical miles (22 km) off Douglas Head. Her crew survive. She was on a voyage from Whitehaven, Cumberland to Douglas.
Moneta	United States	The ship was destroyed by fire at New Orleans. She was on a voyage from New Orleans to Kronstadt, Russia.
Nercy Marie	(flag) France	The ship foundered. She was on a voyage from Madagascar to Mayotte.
Ninas	United Kingdom	The ship was wrecked at "Bangary".
Polar Star	United Kingdom	The ship was wrecked at Amoy, China. Her crew were rescued.
Proven	Norway	The schooner capsized in the North Sea. She was taken in to Farsund on 1 May in a capsized condition.
Right of Way	United Kingdom	The ship was driven ashore at Banff. She was refloated and taken in to Lossiemouth, Moray.
Roma	United Kingdom	The steamship was wrecked on Ockseu Island, Formosa between 11 and 16 April. She was on a voyage from Swatow to Hong Kong.
Sikkoba	Flag unknown	The ship was wrecked on the Horn Reef, in the Baltic Sea. She was on a voyage from Gloucester, United Kingdom to Riga.
Negociant	United Kingdom	The ship was wrecked. She was on a voyage from Swansea, Glamorgan to Algiers, Algeria.
Southwick	United Kingdom	The steamship was driven ashore at Flamborough Head, Yorkshire.
Speedwell	United States	The ship was driven ashore and wrecked at Punta Arenas, Chile. She was on a voyage from San Francisco, California to Punta Arenas.
Tiber	United States	The ship was wrecked on Anegada, Bahamas. She was on a voyage from Trinidad to Baltimore, Maryland.
Tranquebar	United States	The ship was destroyed by fire at Savannah, Georgia.
Valentin	Spain	The schooner was wrecked near "Bouc". Her crew were rescued.
Vidar	Norway	The barque was wrecked near "São Jaca da Barra, Brazil before 26 April. Her crew survived.
Vincent White	Canada	The schooner was wrecked near Cárdenas, Cuba.
Virginia	United States	The steamship ran aground off Key West, Florida.
White Eagle	United States	The fishing schooner was lost on the Grand Bank. Lost with all 12 crewmen.
White Star	United Kingdom	The steamship caught fire and was beached at Cape Bon, Beylik of Tunis where she burnt out. She was on a voyage from Newcastle upon Tyne to Kertch, Russia.
Wilhelmine	Belgium	The ship was driven onto the Lysegrund in a capsized condition with the presumed loss of all hands. She was on a voyage from Pärnu, Russia to Antwerp.
Willy and Emmy	United Kingdom	The ship was wrecked on the Nantucket Shoals, off the coast of Massachusetts, United States. She was on a voyage from Wilmington, Delaware, United States to Queenstown, County Cork.
