= List of shipwrecks in February 1847 =

The list of shipwrecks in February 1847 includes ships sunk, foundered, wrecked, grounded, or otherwise lost during February 1847.

== 1 February ==
List of shipwrecks: 2 February 1847
Ship	State	Description
Bronett	United Kingdom	The Humber Keel sank off Grimsby, Lincolnshire. Her crew survived. She was later refloated and taken in to Grimsby.
Langton	United Kingdom	The flat ran aground and sank at New Brighton, Cheshire. Her crew were rescued. She was on a voyage from Ulverston, Lancashire to Liverpool, Lancashire.
Monarch	United Kingdom	The ship ran aground at Aberdeen. She was on a voyage from Quebec City, Province of Canada, British North America to Aberdeen.
Prince George	United Kingdom	The ship was driven ashore and wrecked in the Dardanelles. Her crew were rescued. She was on a voyage from "Villaregas" to Odesa.

== 2 February ==
List of shipwrecks: 2 February 1847
Ship	State	Description
Catherina	Kingdom of Hanover	The ship foundered off Wangeroog. Her crew were rescued. She was on a voyage from Carolinensiel to London, United Kingdom.
Dora	United Kingdom	The ship departed from Constantinople, Ottoman Empire for Cork or Falmouth, Cornwall. No further trace, presumed foundered with the loss of all hands.
Iodine	United Kingdom	The ship was severely damaged by fire at Hull, Yorkshire.
Lydia	United Kingdom	The barque was wrecked in Portland Bay. She was on a voyage from Port Fairy, New South Wales to London.
Meta	United States	The ship ran aground at the mouth of the Guste. She was on a voyage from New York to Bremen. She was refloated and taken in to Bremerhaven.
Nouveau Tropique	France	The ship was wrecked at Île Bourbon.
Progress	United Kingdom	The schooner ran agrount on the Burbo Bank, in Liverpool Bay. She was on a voyage from Liverpool, Lancashire to Dublin. She was refloated and resumed her voyage.

== 3 February ==
List of shipwrecks: 3 February 1847
Ship	State	Description
Magnet	United Kingdom	The steamship ran aground off Harlingen, Friesland, Netherlands. She was on a voyage from Harlingen to London.
Princess Royal	United Kingdom	The ship was driven ashore at Portishead, Somerset.
Theresa	United Kingdom	The ship was driven ashore between Lilstock and Sheraton, Somerset. Her crew were rescued. She was on a voyage from Swansea, Glamorgan to Bridgwater, Somerset. Theresa was refloated and taken in to Watchet in a derelict condition.
HMS Thunderbolt	United Kingdom	The Driver-class sloop struck rocks off Cape Recife and was beached in Algoa Bay, where she was wrecked. Her crew survived.

== 4 February ==
List of shipwrecks: 4 February 1847
Ship	State	Description
Amazone	(France) Martinique	The schooner was wrecked on Acklins Island, Bahamas. Her crew were rescued. She was on a voyage from Port-au-Prince, Haiti to Savannah, Georgia, United States.
Lively	United Kingdom	The ship was driven ashore between Kingsdown and Walmer Castle, Kent. She was on a voyage from Waterford to London.
Sharp	United Kingdom	The cutter was abandoned in the Atlantic Ocean with the loss of a crew member. She was on a voyage from São Miguel Island, Azores to London.
Venskab	Denmark	The ship was driven ashore and wrecked near the Nakkehead Lighthouse. She was on a voyage from Copenhagen to an English port.

== 5 February ==
List of shipwrecks: 5 February 1847
Ship	State	Description
Bambro' Castle	United Kingdom	The ship was driven ashore and severely damaged at Hull, Yorkshire.
Belvidere	United Kingdom	The ship ran aground at Aberdeen. She was on a voyage from Leith, Lothian to Aberdeen.
Droningen	Norway	The ship was discovered abandoned and derelict in the North Sea and was taken in to Wivenhoe, Essex, United Kingdom. She was on a voyage from Christiansand to "Tregnier", France.
Four Sodskene	Norway	The ship was driven ashore and severely damaged at Bergen. She was on a voyage from St. Ubes, Portugal to Bergen.
Terpsichore	United Kingdom	The ship was wrecked on the Puerto Real. Her crew were rescued. She was on a voyage from Saint John's, Newfoundland, British North America to Havana, Cuba.

== 6 February ==
List of shipwrecks: 6 February 1847
Ship	State	Description
Johannes	Prussia	The ship was driven ashore and wrecked near Memel with the loss of six lives. She was on a voyage from Memel to Wisbech, Cambridgeshire.
Udney	United Kingdom	The ship was in collision with the schooner Archer (United Kingdom) and sank in the North Sea off the Farne Islands, Northumberland. Her crew survived. She was on a voyage from Newcastle upon Tyne, Northumberland to Dundee, Forfarshire.

== 7 February ==
List of shipwrecks: 7 February 1847
Ship	State	Description
Anna Elsabe	United Kingdom	The ship was wrecked on Læsø, Denmark. Her crew were rescued. She was on a voyage from London to Nyborg, Denmark.
Brothers	United Kingdom	The smack ran aground on the Brig Rocks. She was refloated and taken in to Groomsport, County Down in a leaky condition.
Consbrook	United Kingdom	The ship was driven ashore on Burial Island, County Down. She was on a voyage from Belfast, County Antrim to Charleston, South Carolina, United States. She was refloated and resumed her voyage.
Echo	United Kingdom	The ship was wrecked on Læsø. Her crew were rescued. She was on a voyage from London to Nyborg.
Woodmansterne	United Kingdom	The ship was driven ashore 5 leagues (15 nautical miles (28 km) north of Coringa, India.

== 8 February ==
List of shipwrecks: 8 February 1847
Ship	State	Description
Charles	(United Kingdom of Great Britain and Ireland) British North America	The ship was driven ashore and wrecked on Long Island, New York, United States. She was on a voyage from New York City to Halifax, Nova Scotia.
Chillena	United Kingdom	The ship struck the Owers Sandbank, in the English Channel off the coast of Sussex and foundered. Her crew were rescued. She was on a voyage from London to Galaţi, Ottoman Empire.
Elisas Minde	Denmark	The ship was driven ashore near the mouth of the Agger Canal, Denmark. She was on a voyage from Hull, Yorkshire, United Kingdom to Aalborg.
Maria	Sweden	The ship ran aground and sank at Gothenburg with the loss of a crew member. She was on a voyage from South Shields, County Durham, United Kingdom to Gothenburg.
Sir Edward	United Kingdom	The ship was driven ashore at South Shields, County Durham. She was on a voyage from Liverpool, Lancashire to South Shields. She was refloated and taken in to South Shields.
True Blue	United Kingdom	The ship was driven ashore at Battery Point, Devon. She was refloated and beached at Plymouth.

== 9 February ==
List of shipwrecks: 9 February 1847
Ship	State	Description
Eliza Burns	United Kingdom	The ship was sighted off Dunbar, Lothian. No further trace, presumed subsequently foundered with the loss of all hands.
Little Pet	United Kingdom	The ship was driven ashore in Crow Sound, Isles of Scilly. She was refloated.
Mary Ellen	United States	The ship was wrecked off Pulo Subi with the loss of two of her crew. She was on a voyage from Whampoa, China to New York.
Suomi	France	The ship was wrecked near Oran, Algeria. She was on a voyage from Port-la-Nouvelle, Aude to Oran.

== 10 February ==
List of shipwrecks: 10 February 1847
Ship	State	Description
Adventure	United Kingdom	The schooner was driven ashore at the entrance to the Sound of Mull.
Bonne Marie	France	The ship was driven ashore near Bayonne, Basses-Pyrénées. Her crew were rescued.
Charles	United Kingdom	The ship ran aground at Bridlington, Yorkshire. She was on a voyage from Boston, Lincolnshire to Newcastle upon Tyne, Northumberland. She was refloated on 11 February.
Eliza, or Idea	United Kingdom	The abandoned barque was driven ashore on Enniskea Island, County Mayo.
Mary Jane	United Kingdom	The ship was driven ashore at Livorno, Grand Duchy of Tuscany. She was refloated and taken in to Livorno for repairs.
Santa Trinita	Greece	The brig was driven ashore at Livorno.
Vestal	United Kingdom	The ship was driven ashore at Livorno. She was refloated and taken in to Livorno for repairs.

== 11 February ==
List of shipwrecks: 11 February 1847
Ship	State	Description
Chusan	United Kingdom	The ship was wrecked on Grand Cayman, Cayman Islands. Her crew were rescued. She was on a voyage from Demerara, British Guiana to New Orleans, Louisiana.
Due Amici	Flag unknown	The ship was wrecked at Paterno with the loss of all but one of her crew. She was on a voyage from Constantinople, Ottoman Empire to Marseille, Bouches-du-Rhône, France.

== 12 February ==
List of shipwrecks: 12 February 1847
Ship	State	Description
John William	United Kingdom	The ship was driven ashore and damaged near Uggerslev, Denmark. She was on a voyage from Hull, Yorkshire to Danzig. She was refloated and put into Helsingør, Denmark before proceeding on her voyage.
Rose	United Kingdom	The barque struck a sunken rock and sank off Jethou, Channel Islands. Her crew were rescued. She was on a voyage from Newcastle upon Tyne, Northumberland to Guernsey, Channel Islands.
Sir Henry Huntly	United Kingdom	The ship departed from Liverpool, Lancashire for Halifax, Nova Scotia, British North America. No further trace, presumed foundered with the loss of all hands.
Tweed	United Kingdom	The paddle steamer was wrecked on the Alacranes Reef in the Gulf of Mexico with the loss of 72 of the 151 people on board. Survivors were rescued on 17 February by the brig Emilio (Spain). Tweed was on a voyage from Havana, Cuba to Veracruz, Mexico.

== 13 February ==
List of shipwrecks: 13 February 1847
Ship	State	Description
Barbary	United Kingdom	The ship was run down and sunk in the North Sea off Cromer, Norfolk. Her crew were rescued.
Clyde	United Kingdom	The ship ran aground on the Goodwin Sands, Kent. She was refloated and resumed her voyage.
Dolphin	United Kingdom	The schooner was wrecked at Rhoscolyn, Anglesey with the loss of all hands.
Earl of Selkirk	United Kingdom	The ship was driven ashore near Ramsey, Isle of Man. She was on a voyage from Whitehaven, Cumberland to Dundalk, County Louth. She was refloated.
Entran	United States	The ship departed from Baltimore, Maryland for Cork. No further trace, presumed foundered with the loss of all hands.
Hawarden Castle	United Kingdom	The ship foundered off the Saltee Islands, County Wexford. Her crew were rescued by HMS Pigmy (Royal Navy). Hawarden Castle was on a voyage from Belfast, County Antrim to New York, United States.
Hero	United Kingdom	The ship was driven ashore at Maryport, Cumberland. She was on a voyage from Belfast to Maryport. She was refloated the next day and taken in to Maryport.
Leonida	Ottoman Empire	The ship was wrecked on the Capo Bianco Shoal, off the coast of Elba, Grand Duchy of Tuscany. She was on a voyage from Constantinople to Marseille, Bouches-du-Rhône, France.
Robert	United Kingdom	The ship was beached in False Bay. Her crew were rescued. She was on a voyage from Moulmein, Burma to Falmouth, Cornwall. She had become a wreck by 6 March.
Tino	United Kingdom	The ship collided with a schooner off Great Yarmouth, Norfolk and was consequently beached at Skegness, Lincolnshire. She was repaired and resumed her voyage.
Zarna	United Kingdom	The ship was wrecked in the Shiant Isles, Outer Hebrides. Her crew were rescued on 20 February by HMS Stromboli (Royal Navy). She was on a voyage from Liverpool, Lancashire to Christiansand, Norway.

== 14 February ==
List of shipwrecks: 14 February 1847
Ship	State	Description
Angelina	United Kingdom	The ship struck a sunken rock off Buchan Ness, Aberdeenshire and was damaged. She put in to Peterhead, Aberdeenshire. She was on a voyage from Fraserburgh, Aberdeenshire to London.
Delta	United Kingdom	The ship was driven ashore and sank between the English Stones and the British River. Her crew were rescued. She was on a voyage from Newcastle upon Tyne Northumberland to Gloucester.
Effort	United Kingdom	The ship was driven ashore and damaged in Tralee Bay. She was on a voyage from Glasgow, Renfrewshire to Tralee, County Kerry.
Emilie	France	The brig was wrecked on Nash Point, Glamorgan, United Kingdom with the loss of all eight crew. She was on a voyage from Newport, Monmouthshire to Marseille, Bouches-du-Rhône.
Fox	United Kingdom	The ship was driven ashore north of Maryport, Cumberland. She was on a voyage from Belfast, County Antrim to Maryport.
Ganges	United Kingdom	The ship ran aground in Whitby's Passage. She was on a voyage from Moulmein, Burma to an English port. She was refloated and taken in to Moulmein.
Highland Lass	United Kingdom	The ship struck the Tryham Rock and was abandoned. She was on a voyage from Prince Edward Island, British North America to Bideford, Devon. She floated off and came ashore at Ballyshannon, County Donegal.
Honor	United Kingdom	The ship was driven ashore at Ingoldmells, Lincolnshire. She was on a voyage from London to Blyth, Northumberland. She was refloated and resumed her voyage.
Mary Joseph	United Kingdom	The ship was driven ashore on Sully Island, Glamorgan. She was refloated the next day.
Minerva	United Kingdom	The ship was driven ashore and wrecked south of Holyhead, Anglesey. Her crew were rescued. She was on a voyage from Antwerp, Belgium to Belfast, County Antrim.
Rienzi	United Kingdom	The ship was driven ashore and sank on Sully Island, Glamorgan. Her crew were rescued.
HMS Rodney	Royal Navy	The Rodney-class ship of the line ran aground and was damaged at Point St. Angelo, Malta. She was refloated. Repairs were estimated to take a month to complete.

== 15 February ==
List of shipwrecks: 15 February 1847
Ship	State	Description
Earl Grey	United Kingdom	The smack ran aground at Cardiff, Glamorgan. She was on a voyage from Glasgow, Renfrewshire to Bridgwater, Somerset. She was towed off but consequently sank. Her crew were rescued.
Fortuna	United Kingdom	The ship was driven ashore near Mulroy, County Donegal. She was on a voyage from Sligo to Dunfanaghy, County Donegal.
Govan	United Kingdom	The ship was in collision with Joseph Anderson (United Kingdom) in the River Mersey and was beached in Bootle Bay. Govan was on a voyage from Ardrossan, Ayrshire to Runcorn, Cheshire. She was refloated and taken in to Liverpool, Lancashire.
Ivy	United Kingdom	The ship struck the pier and was severely damaged at Scarborough, Yorkshire. She was on a voyage from Hull, Yorkshire to Scarborough.
Jane Tudor	United Kingdom	The barque was wrecked off Great Orme Head, Caernarfonshire. Her crew were rescued. She was on a voyage from Baltimore, Maryland to Liverpool, Lancashire.
Margaret	United Kingdom	The ship was driven ashore near Mulroy.
Minervia	United Kingdom	The galiot was driven ashore and wrecked at Holyhead, Anglesey, United Kingdom. Her crew were rescued. She was on a voyage from Antwerp to Belfast, County Antrim, United Kingdom.
Ovis	United Kingdom	The ship was driven ashore at Blakeney, Norfolk. She was refloated.
Porpoise	United Kingdom	The ship was run into by Hebden (United Kingdom) and sank at Whitby, Yorkshire.

== 16 February ==
List of shipwrecks: 16 February 1847
Ship	State	Description
Commercial	United Kingdom	The ship caught fire and sank at Kirkcaldy, Fife. She was on a voyage from Fisherrow, Lothian to Pettycur, Fife.
Hull	Netherlands	The ship ran aground on the Oosterbank, in the North Sea off the coast of Zeeland and was damaged. She was on a voyage from Sumatra, Netherlands East Indies to Rotterdam, South Holland. She was refloated and taken in to Brouwershaven, Zeeland.
Norma	France	The schooner was driven ashore and wrecked at Beachy Head, Sussex, United Kingdom. She was on a voyage from St. Ubes, Portugal to Dunkirk, Nord.
Regina	United Kingdom	The ship was driven ashore and wrecked in Killala Bay. Her crew were rescued. She was on a voyage from Genoa, Kingdom of Sardinia to Sligo.

== 17 February ==
List of shipwrecks: 17 February 1847
Ship	State	Description
Adler (Адлер)	Imperial Russian Navy	The transport ship was driven ashore and wrecked at Velyaminovsky, with the loss of 27 of the 63 people on board. The survivors were captured by local hill people, but subsequently released.
Flying Fox	(United Kingdom of Great Britain and Ireland) New South Wales	The cutter was wrecked on South Head. All on board were rescued. She was on a voyage from Sydney to Shoalhaven.
Gaspard	Bremen	The ship was driven ashore at "Kernic", Finistère, France. She was on a voyage from Baltimore, Maryland, United States to Bremen. She had become a wreck by 24 February.
Hammonia	Hamburg	The ship was driven ashore and damaged in the Elbe. She was on a voyage from Hull, Yorkshire, United Kingdom to Hamburg. She floated off on 19 February and subsequently ran aground at Glückstadt.
Herald	United Kingdom	The ship was wrecked on the coast of British Honduras.
William and Sally	United Kingdom	The ship ran agroundand was damaged on the Goodwin Sands, Kent. She was on a voyage from Swansea, Glamorgan to Hull. She was refloated.

== 18 February ==
List of shipwrecks: 18 February 1847
Ship	State	Description
Georgiana	United States	The ship sprang a leak and was beached in the Berry Islands. She was on a voyage from New Orleans, Louisiana to Bordeaux, Gironde, France.
Jane	United Kingdom	The sloop collided with Cornelius in the North Sea and was abandoned off Winterton-on-Sea, Norfolk. Her crew were rescued by Cornelius. Jane was on a voyage from Lowestoft, Suffolk to Goole, Yorkshire. She was taken in to Great Yarmouth, Norfolk in a derelict condition on 28 February.
Lane	United Kingdom	The ship was sighted in the Grand Banks of Newfoundland whilst on a voyage from Norfolk, Virginia, United States for Kilrush, County Clare. No further trace, presumed foundered with the loss of all hands.
Margaret and Graham	United Kingdom	The ship was wrecked on the West Rocks, in the North Sea off the coast of Essex. Her crew survived. She was on a voyage from Sunderland, County Durham to London.

== 19 February ==
List of shipwrecks: 19 February 1847
Ship	State	Description
Clémence	France	The full-rigged ship was driven ashore at Andreselles, Pas-de-Calais.
Eagle	United Kingdom	The steamship ran aground off Saint Thomas, Virgin Islands. She was on a voyage from Trinidad to Saint Thomas. She was refloated and put in to Grenada.
Janet	United Kingdom	The ship was driven ashore and severely damaged at Dundee, Forfarshire. She was refloated.
Mary Ellen	United Kingdom	The ship collided with Perilla (United Kingdom) and sank in the Bristol Channel. She was refloated on 23 February and taken in to Newport, Monmouthshire.
Wilhelm	Bremen	The ship ran aground on the Robber Platte, in the North Sea. Her crew were rescued. She was on a voyage from Hull, Yorkshire, United Kingdom to Bremen.

== 20 February ==
List of shipwrecks: 20 February 1847
Ship	State	Description
Commerce	United Kingdom	The sloop ran aground on Inchgarvie. She was on a voyage from Glasgow, Renfrewshire to Montrose, Forfarshire. She was refloated and taken in to Inverkeithing, Fife.
Croft	United Kingdom	The ship was driven ashore at Lindisfarne, Northumberland. She was refloated.
David	United Kingdom	The ship was driven ashore at Lindisfarne. She was refloated.
General	United Kingdom	The ship sprang a leak and capsized at Galaţi, Ottoman Empire.
Jessie	United Kingdom	The ship was driven ashore at Rhosneigr, Anglesey, She was on a voyage from Constantinople, Ottoman Empire to London. She was refloated on 27 February and taken in to Holyhead, Anglesey.
Maid of Mona	(United Kingdom of Great Britain and Ireland) Isle of Man	The ship was wrecked near Nuevitas, Cuba. Her crew were rescued. She was on a voyage from Liverpool, Lancashire to Havana, Cuba.
HMRC Nimble	Board of Customs	The cutter struck a rock and sank west of Berry Head, Devon. Her crew were rescued.
Rambler	United Kingdom	The ship ran aground on the White Sands, in Table Bay. She was on a voyage from Lombok, Netherlands East Indies to the Cape of Good Hope, Cape Colony. She was refloated.
Watchword	United Kingdom	The ship ran aground on the Grain Spit, in the Thames Estuary. She was on a voyage from Constantinople, Ottoman Empire to London. She was refloated the next day and put in to Stangate Creek.

== 21 February ==
List of shipwrecks: 21 February 1847
Ship	State	Description
Brechin Castle	United Kingdom	The barque foundered in the Bristol Channel with the loss of 25 lives. She was on a voyage from Port Adelaide, South Australia to Swansea, Glamorgan.
Mazeppa	United Kingdom	The steamship ran aground and sank off the coast of Wigtownshire. Her crew were rescued. She was on a voyage from Glasgow, Renfrewshire to Liverpool, Lancashire.
Tiber	United Kingdom	The P&O paddle steamer was wrecked at "Ville de Conde", 12 nautical miles (22 km) from Porto, Portugal with the loss of one life. She was on a voyage from Lisbon, Portugal to Vigo, Spain.

== 22 February ==
List of shipwrecks: 22 February 1847
Ship	State	Description
Acorn	United Kingdom	The ship ran aground on the La Folle Reef. She was on a voyage from Liverpool, Lancashire to Port-au-Prince, Haiti. She was refloated but grounded again. Refloated a second time and completed her voyage.
Bustin	United Kingdom	The brig ran aground on the Punta Reef, off the coast of Cuba and was damaged She was refloated and taken in to Havana, Cuba for repairs.
Duque de Porto	Portuguese Navy	The steamship was wrecked on the Felgaieras Rocks, in the Douro at Matosinhos with the loss of all eighteen of her crew. She was later refloated and beached at the mouth of the Douro.
Louise Bertha	Prussia	The ship was driven ashore 20 nautical miles (37 km) north of Memel.
Two Sisters	United Kingdom	The ship sank in the River Ouse at Swinefleet, Yorkshire. She was on a voyage from Wells-next-the-Sea, Norfolk to Goole, Yorkshire.
Winguard	Norway	The ship departed from Torbay for New York, United States. No further trace, presumed foundered with the loss of all hands.

== 23 February ==
List of shipwrecks: 23 February 1847
Ship	State	Description
Britta Emelia	Sweden	The ship was driven ashore at Trondheim, Norway in a capsized condition. She was on a voyage from Gothenburg to Guernsey, Channel Islands.
Busy	United Kingdom	The smack struck rocks at Stepper Point, Cornwall and sank. Her crew were rescued.
Cuba	United Kingdom	The ship was in collision with another vessel and was abandoned in the Irish Sea off the Isle of Man. She was on a voyage from Whitehaven, Cumberland to Antigua. Cuba was towed in to Kingstown, County Dublin the next day in a crippled condition.
Elise	Prussia	The ship was driven ashore at Wick, Caithness, United Kingdom. She was on a voyage from Swinemünde to Wick. She was refloated the next day and taken in to Wick for repairs.
John Wilson	United Kingdom	The ship was driven ashore 3 nautical miles (5.6 km) from Port Carlisle, Cumberland. She was on a voyage from Saint John, New Brunswick, British North America to Carlisle, Cumberland.
Mercurio	Malta	The ship was wrecked on the North Rock. Her crew were rescued. She was on a voyage from Ardrossan, Ayrshire, United Kingdom to Malta.
Shannon	United Kingdom	The ship ran aground on the Herd Sand, in the North Sea off the coast of County Durham. She was on a voyage from South Shields, County Durham to the West Indies. She was refloated with assistance from Joseph and William and Tiger (both United Kingdom).

== 24 February ==
List of shipwrecks: 25 February 1847
Ship	State	Description
Percival	(United Kingdom of Great Britain and Ireland) British North America	The ship departed from Liverpool, Lancashire for Boston, Massachusetts, United States. No further trace, presumed foundered with the loss of all hands.

== 25 February ==
List of shipwrecks: 25 February 1847
Ship	State	Description
Dapper	United Kingdom	The ship sprang a leak and sank in the North Sea off Seaham, County Durham. Her crew were rescued.
Unity	United Kingdom	The ship was driven ashore and sank in the River Tay.

== 26 February ==
List of shipwrecks: 26 February March 1847
Ship	State	Description
John Bell	United Kingdom	The ship was driven ashore and wrecked in Tara Bay, County Antrim. She was on a voyage from Irvine, Ayrshire to Portaferry, County Down.
Tipula	United Kingdom	The ship was driven ashore at Constantinople, Ottoman Empire. She was on a voyage from Liverpool, Lancashire to Constantinople.

== 27 February ==
List of shipwrecks: 28 February 1847
Ship	State	Description
Jane Lowder	United Kingdom	The ship foundered in the Atlantic Ocean (47°53′N 9°57′W). Her crew were rescued by the schooner Feliz Uniao (Portugal). Jane Lowder was on a voyage from Marseille, Bouches-du-Rhône, France to Cork.
Johanna	Prussia	The schooner was driven ashore and wrecked at Odesa.
Marco Bozzari	Greece	The brig was driven ashore and wrecked at Odesa.
Ocean	Russia	The barque was driven ashore and wrecked at Odesa.

== 28 February ==
List of shipwrecks: 28 February 1847
Ship	State	Description
Cornelia	United Kingdom	The ship was abandoned in the Atlantic Ocean. Her crew were rescued. She was on a voyage from Baltimore, Maryland, United States to Cork.
Edward	Grand Duchy of Mecklenburg-Schwerin	The full-rigged ship was driven ashore at Odesa. Her crew were rescued.
Four Brothers	United Kingdom	The ship was driven ashore and severely damaged at Teignmouth, Devon. She was refloated on 1 March.
Nancy	(United Kingdom of Great Britain and Ireland) British North America	The ship was wrecked on Key Britten. She was on a voyage from Kingston, Jamaica to Halifax, Nova Scotia.
Rose	United Kingdom	The schooner was run down and sunk in the River Thames at Old Haven by the steamship Royal Victoria (United Kingdom) with the loss of seven of her eight crew. The survivor was rescued by Royal Victoria. Rose was on a voyage from London to Exeter, Devon. She was refloated the next day and beached on the Essex bank of the river.

== Unknown date ==
List of shipwrecks: Unknown date in February 1847
Ship	State	Description
Amaury	France	The ship was driven ashore at the Cordouan Lighthouse before 24 February. Her crew were rescued. She had floated off and drifted out to sea by 25 February. Amaury was subsequently taken in to the Gironde.
Anna	Netherlands	The galiot was wrecked on Imbros, Ottoman Empire before 13 February. She was on a voyage from Smyrna, Ottoman Empire to the Gulf of Saros and Amsterdam, North Holland.
Apollo	United Kingdom	The ship was abandoned in the Atlantic Ocean before 9 February. She was discovered by Solon (United Kingdom on that date and set afire.
Barbadoes	United Kingdom	The ship was lost before 7 February. Seven crew were rescued by Camœna and Radius (both United Kingdom). Barbadoes was on a voyage from Savanilla, Republic of New Granada to Liverpool, Lancashire.
Brechin Castle	United Kingdom	The ship foundered in the Bristol Channel off Pwlldye, Glamorgan on or before 22 February.
Charade	France	The steamship was wrecked on the coast of Senegal with the loss of 25 to 30 lives.
Christoph Columb	France	The ship was wrecked on the Colorados, off the coast of Cuba. Her crew were rescued.
Danubio	Austrian Empire	The barque was beached on Bazza Island, Greece after colliding with another vessel. She was on a voyage from Fiume to Hull, Yorkshire.
Duke of Oporto	Portugal	The steamship was wrecked at the mouth of the Douro.
Elizabeth	(United Kingdom of Great Britain and Ireland) British North America	The ship was abandoned in the Atlantic Ocean. She was towed in to Denman's Bay, County Cork on 21 February.
Eugene	France	The ship was driven ashore at Cape Janissary, Ottoman Empire, in the Dardanelles. She was on a voyage from Odesa to Marseille, Bouches-du-Rhône. She was refloated.
Getruida Hendrika	Flag unknown	The galiot was wrecked on the Goodwin Sands, Kent, United Kingdom before 25 February.
Glencal	United Kingdom	The ship was driven ashore at Kilrush, County Clare. She was refloated on 17 February.
Grecian	United Kingdom	The ship was driven ashore at "Heraclia", Ottoman Empire before 18 February. She was on a voyage from the Danube to an English port. She had been refloated by 26 February and taken in to Constantinople, Ottoman Empire.
Hanover	United Kingdom	The ship was driven ashore on the Arabian coast 150 nautical miles (280 km) north east of Aden before 26 February. Her crew were rescued. She was on a voyage from Aden to Ceylon.
Henriette	Belgium	The ship was driven ashore at the entrance to the Dardanelles before 3 February. She was on a voyage from Antwerp to Odesa. She was refloated.
Isabella	(United Kingdom of Great Britain and Ireland) British North America	The ship was wrecked on Cape Sable Island, Nova Scotia before 2 February. Her crew were rescued. She was on a voyage from Saint Johns, Newfoundland to Sydney, Nova Scotia.
Izette	United States	The barque was driven ashore at Le Tréport, Seine-Inférieure, France before 10 February.
HMS Jackal	Royal Navy	The Jackal-class gunvessel ran aground and was damaged at Lisbon.
Lady Reid	United Kingdom	The ship was abandoned before 15 February.
Lord Stanley	United Kingdom	The ship was damaged by fire whilst bound for Aden, where she arrived on 2 March.
Minerva	United Kingdom	The ship was driven ashore and wrecked at Holyhead, Anglesey before 20 February.
Mogul	Kingdom of the Two Sicilies	The ship was driven ashore and wrecked in the Dardanelles before 3 February. Her crew were rescued.
Ondiaka	United States	Mexican–American War: The troopship was wrecked on the coast of Mexico before 4 February. All on board survived, but were taken as prisoners of war by the Mexicans.
Oura	Russia	The ship was driven ashore at the entrance to the Dardanelles before 3 February. She was on a voyage from Liverpool to Odesa. She was refloated.
Princess Marie	France	The ship was wrecked on the Colorados. Her crew were rescued.
Sea Nymph	(United Kingdom of Great Britain and Ireland) British North America	The ship was abandoned in the Atlantic Ocean before 28 February.
Sharp	United Kingdom	The cutter was abandoned in the Atlantic Ocean (41°00′N 11°20′W). Her crew were rescued by the brig Le Jeune Polyxene (France). Sharp was on a voyage from São Miguel Island, Azores to London.
Sisters	United Kingdom	The ship departed from Leith, Lothian for Donegal in early February. No further trace, presumed foundered with the loss of all hands.
HMS Thetis	Royal Navy	The fifth rate ran aground at Lisbon. She was ordered to Plymouth, Devon for repairs.
William McCulloch	United Kingdom	The ship was driven ashore near Moville, County Donegal. She was refloated and put back to Londonderry, where she arrived on 24 February.
