= David Napier (marine engineer) =

Scottish marine engineer

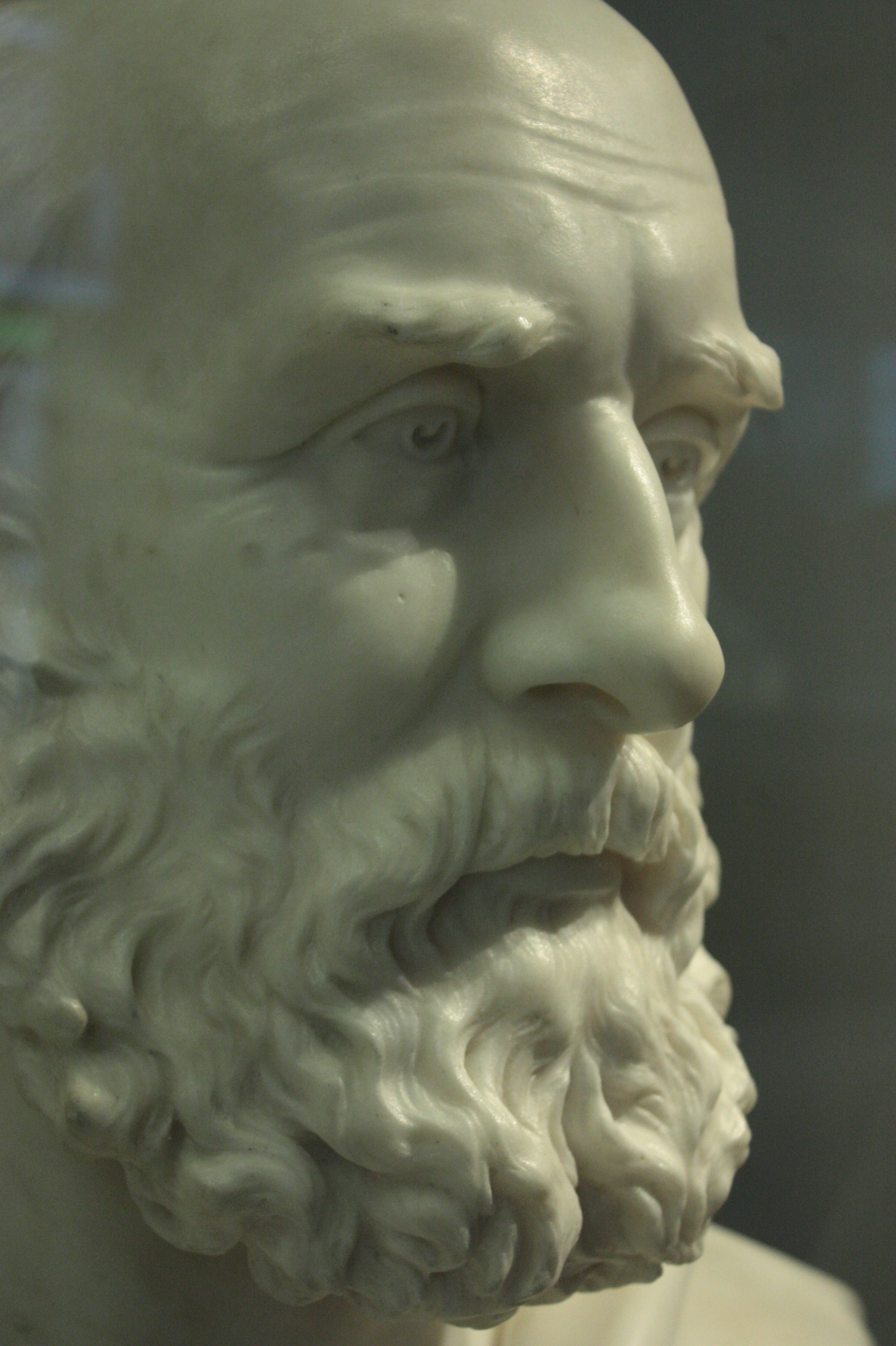
David Napier, bust by Matthew Noble 1871

David Napier (10 November 1790– 23 November 1869) was a Scottish marine engineer.

Napier began in his father's works at Camlachie and built the boiler for Henry Bell's Comet in 1812. Subsequently, he took over the foundry and established a reputation as one of the best builders of marine engines in Scotland. In 1821 Napier moved to Lancefield Quay on the north bank of the Clyde and Camlachie was taken over by his cousin Robert Napier. At Lancefield Napier began to construct complete ships, including in 1827 the Aglaia. This was one of the world's first iron steam-ships, built to ply on Loch Eck as part of a "new route" to Inveraray which opened around 1835. The route included construction of a Clyde pier at Kilmun, and a road for a steam coach to take passengers to the loch steamer. "Aglaia" in fact had only an iron bottom, and wooden sides above water. She was afterwards called the "James Gallacher", and plied on the Clyde. Her dimensions were as follows: Length, 62' 8"; breadth, 13' 0"; depth, 4' 6"; gross tonnage, 49 36/94 tons. The world's first iron steamer was the paddle steamer Aaron Manby of 1821.

Napier was widely discredited after a series of boiler explosions between 1835 and 1838. Two of these involved the same steamer, the Victoria of Hull, which twice suffered boiler explosions on the Thames in 1838. On the second occasion, 14 June 1838, nine men were killed and a lengthy inquest saw heavy criticism of Napier's boilers and his conduct after the first accident of 16 March 1838.

In 1839 Napier acquired a shipyard on the River Thames at Millwall, London, which is commemorated in the modern Napier Avenue. The yard was run by two of his sons, while Napier himself continued with experiments in improving the steamboat. In 1854 the yard was sold to Messrs J Scott Russell and used for building the Great Eastern.

His youngest son, Robert D. Napier (1821 – May 1885), was a noted marine engineer with several inventions and research papers to his credit.

Another son, Francis Napier ( – 23 December 1875) was a surveyor with the Harbours and Rivers Department, Sydney, and noted member and diarist of Francis Cadell's exploration of the Northern Territory coast 1867–68.
