= Robert D. Napier =

Scottish engineer

Robert D. Napier (1821 – May 1885) was a Scottish engineer, and the youngest son of David Napier (marine engineer).

Educated in Liverpool and London, Robert D. Napier worked, with brothers John D. and Francis ("Frank") for his father's shipbuilding firm. At the age of 30, he moved to Australia, where he oversaw dredging operations in Sydney Harbour. While there, he invented the "Differential Self-Acting Friction Brake" and the "Napier Windlass".

In 1856 he brought out to Port Adelaide, South Australia in sections, a paddle-steamer Moolgewanke for trading on the River Murray. He and partner Capt. William Webb operated her for a few years from Goolwa before selling her, with barge Unknown, to George Bain Johnston. He was also involved with Capt. William McCoy in operating the paddle steamer Leichardt. He returned to Scotland about 1865–1866 and established a new business "Napier Brothers" with his brother John.

Napier also experimented and wrote on a number of important scientific topics. He is best known for his 1866 work "On the Velocity of Steam and other Gases, and the True Principles of the Discharge of Fluids". This work was one of the earliest discussions of the diverging nozzle, later known as the de Laval nozzle. It presented the well-known "Napier formula" for steam loss through an orifice. He also wrote a number of papers on the flow of water through nozzles.

He never married, and he died in Glasgow in May, 1885.
