= USS Zeta =

Union Navy steam ship

History

United States
- Launched: 1844
- Acquired: 3 June 1864
- Commissioned: 8 June 1864
- Decommissioned: circa May 1865
- Fate: Sold, 24 June 1865

General characteristics
- Displacement: 60 tons
- Length: 58 ft (18 m)
- Beam: 13 ft (4.0 m)
- Depth of hold: 5 ft (1.5 m)
- Propulsion: steam engine; screw-propelled
- Speed: 8 knots (15 km/h; 9.2 mph)
- Armament: eight Enfield muskets; one spar torpedo

USS Zeta was a steamer acquired by the Union Navy during the American Civil War. She was used by the Union Navy as a torpedo boat in support of the Union blockade of Confederate waterways.

== Service history ==
J. G. Loane—a small wooden steamer built at Philadelphia, Pennsylvania, in 1844—was purchased by the Navy on 3 June 1864 at Philadelphia from William S. Mason. Renamed Tug No. 6 and commissioned on 8 June 1864, this small craft was sometimes referred to as Picket Boat No. 6 in dispatches. Renamed Zeta in the following November, she served as a torpedo tug in the James River until April 1865. Transferred in that month to the Potomac River flotilla of Comdr. Foxhall A. Parker, Zeta guarded the Bush River (Maryland) Bridge until sent to the Washington Navy Yard in May. Her services no longer required, Zeta was sold to C. Vanderwerken on 24 June 1865.
