= HMS Lizard (1844) =

Gunvessel of the Royal Navy

- A Jackal-class gunvessel

History

United Kingdom
- Name: HMS Lizard
- Ordered: 16 January 1844
- Builder: Robert Napier and Sons, Govan
- Cost: Hull £5,680, machinery £6,000, fitting £2,658
- Yard number: 9
- Laid down: 1844
- Launched: 28 November 1844
- Commissioned: 27 November 1845
- Fate: Broken up in April 1869

General characteristics
- Class & type: Jackal-class second-class gunvessel
- Tons burthen: 340 bm
- Length: 142 ft 7 1/4 in (43.5 m) (overall); 126 ft 10 1/2 in (38.7 m) (keel)
- Beam: 22 ft 6 in (6.9 m)
- Depth of hold: 12 ft 9 1/2 in (3.9 m)
- Installed power: 150 nhp; 455 ihp (339 kW)
- Propulsion: 2-cylinder side-lever steam engine; Paddle wheels
- Sail plan: 2-masted schooner
- Complement: 60
- Armament: 1 × 18-pounder (22cwt) (Note: 22 cwt is the weight of the gun ("cwt" = hundredweight)) carronade on pivot; 2 × 24-pounder (13cwt) carronades

HMS Lizard was a Jackal-class second-class iron paddle gunvessel of the Royal Navy. She was built by Robert Napier and Sons at Govan to a design by William Symonds, the Surveyor of the Navy. She was launched in 1844, was damaged at the Anglo-French blockade of the Río de la Plata, performed fishery protection duties off Scotland and broken up in 1869.

== Design ==
Orders for Lizard and her sister Jackal were placed on 16 January 1844. They were designed by the builder, Robert Napier and Sons and approved on 17 April 1844 by the Surveyor of the Navy, Sir William Symonds.

Lizard was fitted with a Napier two-cylinder side-lever steam engine driving side paddles. The engine was rated at 150 nominal horsepower and on trials developed 455 indicated horsepower (339 kW). She was provided with two gaff-rigged masts, making her a schooner. Her armament consisted of a single 18-pounder (22cwt) carronade on a pivot mounting and two 24-pounder (13cwt) carronades.

== Construction ==
Both ships were built at Napier's Govan yard. Jackall was built as yard number 8, and Lizard as number 9. Lizard was launched on 28 December 1844, exactly a month after Jackal. After fitting out, Lizard's first commissioning took place on 27 November 1845.

== Service ==
Lizard's first commission was in the Mediterranean, and later on the south-east coast of South America. She took part in an Anglo-French action in Uruguay in 1845, during which she was "riddled from stem to stern," passing the San Lorenzo shore battery, and suffered 4 men killed and 4 wounded. On 1 August 1848, she assisted in the refloating of the British merchant ship Sappho, which had run aground in the River Plate on 23 July. By 1858, she, like her sister ship, was engaged in fishery protection duties off Scotland, as a tender to HMS Formidable.

== Fate ==
Lizard was broken up at Chatham in April 1869.
