= Jackal-class gunvessel =

- A Jackal-class gunvessel

Class overview
- Name: Jackal class
- Builders: Robert Napier and Sons, Govan
- Operators: Royal Navy
- Preceded by: Nil
- Succeeded by: Torch class
- Built: 1844
- In service: 1845-1887
- Completed: 2
- Scrapped: 2

General characteristics
- Type: Iron second-class gunvessel
- Tons burthen: 340 bm
- Length: 142 ft 7 1/4 in (43.5 m) (overall); 126 ft 10 1/2 in (38.7 m) (keel)
- Beam: 22 ft 6 in (6.9 m)
- Depth of hold: 12 ft 9 1/2 in (3.9 m)
- Installed power: 150 nhp; 455 ihp (339 kW)
- Propulsion: 2-cylinder side-lever steam engine; Paddle wheels
- Sail plan: 2-masted schooner
- Complement: 60
- Armament: 1 × 18-pounder (22cwt) (Note: 22 cwt is the weight of the gun ("cwt" = hundredweight)) carronade on pivot; 2 × 24-pounder (13cwt) carronades

The Jackal-class gunvessel (alternatively spelled Jackall) was a class of two second-class iron paddle gunvessels built for the Royal Navy in the mid 1840s. They served in the Mediterranean and South Atlantic, and latterly on fishery protection duties off Scotland.

== Design ==
Orders for both ships were placed on 16 January 1844. They were designed by the builder, Robert Napier and Sons and approved on 17 April 1844 by the Surveyor of the Navy, Sir William Symonds.

They were each fitted with a Napier two-cylinder side-lever steam engine driving side paddles. The engine was rated at 150 nominal horsepower and on trials developed 455 indicated horsepower (339 kW). Two gaff-rigged masts were provided, making them schooners. The armament consisted of a single 18-pounder (22cwt) carronade on a pivot mounting and two 24-pounder (13cwt) carronades.

== Construction ==
Both ships were built at Napier's Govan yard. Jackall was built as yard number 8, and Lizard as number 9. Jackall was launched on 28 November 1844, and Lizard followed exactly a month later.

== Service ==
Jackall served in the Mediterranean and at Ascension, and by 1864 she was employed on fishery protection duties off the west coast of Scotland.

Lizard also served in the Mediterranean, and took part in an Anglo-French action in Uruguay in 1845, receiving serious damage and losing 4 men. By 1858 she was also engaged in fishery protection duties off Scotland.

== Ships ==
Name	Ship Builder	Launched	Fate
Jackall	Robert Napier and Sons, Govan	28 October 1844	Sold for breaking in November 1887
Lizard	Robert Napier and Sons, Govan	28 November 1844	Broken up at Chatham in April 1869
