= HMS Jackal (1844) =

Gunvessel of the Royal Navy

- A Jackal-class gunvessel

History

United Kingdom
- Name: HMS Jackal
- Ordered: 16 January 1844
- Builder: Robert Napier and Sons, Govan
- Cost: Hull £5,680, machinery £6,000, fitting £2,985
- Yard number: 8
- Laid down: 1844
- Launched: 28 October 1844
- Commissioned: 22 September 1845
- Fate: Sold for breaking, November 1887

General characteristics
- Class & type: Jackal-class second-class gunvessel
- Tons burthen: 340 bm
- Length: 142 ft 7 1/4 in (43.5 m) (overall); 126 ft 10 1/2 in (38.7 m) (keel)
- Beam: 22 ft 6 in (6.9 m)
- Depth of hold: 12 ft 9 1/2 in (3.9 m)
- Installed power: 150 nhp; 455 ihp (339 kW)
- Propulsion: 2-cylinder side-lever steam engine; Paddle wheels
- Sail plan: 2-masted schooner
- Complement: 60
- Armament: 1 × 18-pounder (22cwt) (Note: 22 cwt is the weight of the gun ("cwt" = hundredweight)) carronade on pivot; 2 × 24-pounder (13cwt) carronades

HMS Jackal (alternatively spelled Jackall) was a Jackal-class second-class iron paddle gunvessel of the Royal Navy.

== Design ==
Orders for Jackal and her sister Lizard were placed on 16 January 1844. They were designed by the builder, Robert Napier and Sons and approved on 17 April 1844 by the Surveyor of the Navy, Sir William Symonds.

Jackal was fitted with a Napier two-cylinder side-lever steam engine driving side paddles. The engine was rated at 150 nominal horsepower and on trials developed 455 indicated horsepower (339 kW). She was provided with two gaff-rigged masts, making her a schooner. Her armament consisted of a single 18-pounder (22cwt) carronade on a pivot mounting and two 24-pounder (13cwt) carronades.

== Construction ==
Both ships were built at Napier's Govan yard. Jackall was built as yard number 8, and Lizard as number 9. Jackall was launched on 28 November 1844, and Lizard followed exactly a month later. After fitting out, Jackall's first commissioning took place on 22 September 1845.

== Service ==
After commissioning at Plymouth in 1846, Jackall served in the Mediterranean. In February 1847, she ran aground and was damaged at Lisbon, Portugal. By 1851 she was a store ship at Ascension Island. She paid off at Sheerness in May 1859 and was recommissioned in December of the same year.

She was again paid off at Keyham, Devon on 8 February 1864, recommissioned the next day.

By 1864 she was employed on fishery protection duties off the west coast of Scotland. On 11 April 1872, she ran aground at the mouth of the River Aray. She was refloated and anchored in Inveraray Bay. In early 1883 Jackal landed a detachment of Royal Marines at Meanish Pier in Glendale, Skye to assist police in arresting participants in the Crofters' War, a dispute between landowners and tenants over increases to rents and evictions implemented to clear land for large-scale farming operations.

== Fate ==
Jackal was sold for breaking up in November 1887.
